= List of Australian Asia Pacific Screen Award winners and nominees =

This is a list of Australian Asia Pacific Screen Awards winners and nominees. This list details the performances of Australian actors, actresses, and films that have either been submitted or nominated for, or have won, an Asia Pacific Screen Award.

== Awards and nominations ==
| Year (Ceremony) | Award | Recipient | Result | Note | Ref. |
|---|---|---|---|---|---|
| 2007 (1st) | Best Screenplay | Michael James Rowland and Helen Barnes; Lucky Miles | Nominated | | |
| 2008 (2nd) | Best Children's Feature Film | The Black Balloon | Won | | |
| 2009 (3rd) | Best Feature Film | Samson and Delilah | Won | | |
| 2009 (3rd) | Best Documentary Feature Film | Gandhi's Children | Nominated | | |
| 2009 (3rd) | Best Animated Feature Film | Mary and Max | Won | | |
| 2010 (4th) | Best Children's Feature Film | Bran Nue Dae | Nominated | | |
| 2010 (4th) | Best Animated Feature Film | Legend of the Guardians: The Owls of Ga'Hoole | Nominated | American-Australian co-production | |
| 2011 (5th) | Best Children's Feature Film | Red Dog | Nominated | | |
| 2011 (5th) | Best Actor | Daniel Connor; Toomelah | Nominated | | |
| 2011 (5th) | Best Actress | Judy Davis; The Eye of the Storm | Nominated | | |
| 2011 (5th) | Cultural Diversity Award (UNESCO) | Toomelah | Won | | |
| 2012 (6th) | Best Animated Feature Film | Happy Feet Two | Nominated | | |
| 2013 (7th) | Best Feature Film | The Turning | Nominated | | |
| 2013 (7th) | Best Actor | Aaron Pedersen; Mystery Road | Nominated | | |
| 2013 (7th) | Best Cinematography | Mandy Walker; Tracks | Nominated | | |
| 2014 (8th) | Best Director | Rolf de Heer; Charlie's Country | Nominated | | |
| 2014 (8th) | Best Actor | David Gulpilil; Charlie's Country | Special Mention | | |
| 2014 (8th) | Best Animated Feature Film | Maya the Bee | Nominated | Australian-German co-production | |
| 2014 (8th) | Best Youth Feature Film | 52 Tuesdays | Nominated | | |
| 2015 (9th) | Best Actor | Reef Ireland; Downriver | Nominated | | |
| 2015 (9th) | Best Documentary Feature Film | Another Country | Nominated | | |
| 2015 (9th) | Best Animated Feature Film | Blinky Bill the Movie | Nominated | Australian-Indian-Irish co-production | |
| 2015 (9th) | Cultural Diversity Award (UNESCO) | Spear | Special Mention | | |
| 2016 (10th) | APSA Jury Grand Prize | Lion | Special Mention | | |
| 2016 (10th) | Best Documentary Feature Film | Snow Monkey | Nominated | Australian-Norwegian co-production | |
| 2017 (11th) | Best Feature Film | Sweet Country | Won | | |
| 2017 (11th) | Best Cinematography | Warwick Thornton and Dylan River; Sweet Country | Nominated | | |
| 2017 (11th) | Best Screenplay | David Tranter and Steven McGregor; Sweet Country | Nominated | | |
| 2017 (11th) | Best Documentary Feature Film | The Opposition | Nominated | Australian-Papua New Guinean co-production | |
| 2017 (11th) | Best Youth Feature Film | The Seen and Unseen | Won | Indonesian-Dutch-Australian-Qatari co-production | |
| 2017 (11th) | Best Youth Feature Film | Jasper Jones | Nominated | | |
| 2018 (12th) | Best Director | Bruce Beresford; Ladies in Black | Nominated | | |
| 2018 (12th) | Best Documentary Feature Film | Gurrumul | Won | | |
| 2019 (13th) | Best Documentary Feature Film | The Australian Dream | Nominated | Australian-British co-production | |
| 2019 (13th) | Best Youth Feature Film | Buoyancy | Won | | |

- Nominations – 35
- Wins – 8
- Special Mention – 3

== See also ==
- List of Australian submissions for the Academy Award for Best International Feature Film
