= Mystery Road =

Mystery Road may refer to:

- Mystery Road (film), a 2013 Australian neo-western crime film
- Mystery Road (TV series), an Australian television drama series (2018–2020)
- Mystery Road: Origin, prequel to the TV series, aired from 2022
- Mystery Road (album), a 1989 album by Drivin N Cryin
- The Mystery Road, a 1921 British drama film

== See also ==
- Goldstone (film), 2016 film, sequel to Mystery Road (2013)
- Gravity hill, a geographical phenomenon where a downward-sloping hill appears to slope upward
