= Mystery Road: Origin =

Australian television series

- Genre: Crime; Mystery; Neo-noir; Drama
- Written by: Blake Ayshford; Steven McGregor; Dylan River; Kodie Bedford; Jada Alberts; Erica Glynn; Samuel Paynter; Gary Hamaguchi
- Directed by: Dylan River; Wayne Blair; Jub Clerc
- Starring: Mark Coles Smith; Tuuli Narkle
- Country of origin: Australia
- Original language: English
- No. of series: 2
- No. of episodes: 12

Production
- Executive producers: Ivan Sen; Sally Riley; Brett Sleigh; Rachel Okine
- Producers: David Jowsey; Greer Simpkin
- Production company: Bunya Productions

Original release
- Network: ABC TV
- Release: 3 July 2022 – present

Related
- Mystery Road (film); Goldstone, Mystery Road (TV series)

Mystery Road: Origin is an Australian television crime mystery series. It is a prequel to the TV series Mystery Road, which first aired on ABC TV from 3 June 2018. Both series are spin-offs from Ivan Sen's feature films Mystery Road and Goldstone. The series focuses on the early career of indigenous detective Jay Swan, and his relationship with his future wife Mary. Jay and Mary are played by Mark Coles Smith and Tuuli Narkle, succeeding Aaron Pedersen and Tasma Walton, who played the roles in the film and earlier series.

The first series aired from 3 July 2022, with the second debuting on 21 September 2025.

== Synopsis ==
=== Season 1 ===
The year is 1999, and a young Jay Swan moves back to his home town of Jardine to join the local police force. He must cope with his estranged father Jack and his feelings for local girl Mary Allen, as well as contending with a mysterious gang of robbers.

=== Season 2 ===
Six months on from the previous season, Jay and Mary are settled into a small town on Mary’s mother's Country, and Mary is working at a local hospital.

== Cast ==
=== Season 1 ===
- Mark Coles Smith as Jay Swan
- Tuuli Narkle as Mary Allen
- Toby Leonard Moore as Abe
- Daniel Henshall as Patrick
- Steve Bisley as Peter Lovric
- Salme Geransar as Anousha
- Lisa Flanagan as Catherine
- Clarence Ryan as Sputty
- Caroline Brazier as Geraldine
- Hayley McElhinney as Max
- Serene Yunupingu as Lartesha
- Kelton Pell as Jack Swan
- Leonie Whyman as Cissy
- Nina Young as Fiona
- Jayden Popik as Xavier
- Grace Chow as Cindy
- Megan Wilding as Ziggy
- Ling-Hsueh Tang as Poppy (2 episodes)
- Geoff Morrell as Phillip (6 episodes)
- George Shevtsov as Rex

=== Season 2 ===
- Mark Coles Smith as Jay Swan
- Tuuli Narkle as Mary Allen
- Geoff Morrell as Philip
- Helen Morse as Sister Kelly
- Robyn Malcolm as Sgt Simmo
- Nicholas Bell as Garry
- Steve Le Marquand as The Cowboy
- Aswan Reid as Swayze
- Shantae Barnes-Cowan as Lana
- Luke Carroll as Joey
- Eloise Hart as Anya
- Marley Sharp as Sam
- Scarlett Yarran as Scarlett

== Episodes ==
Series	Episodes	Originally released	
Series	Episodes	First released	Last released
1	6	3 July 2022	7 August 2022
2	6	21 September 2025	26 October 2025

=== Season 1 (2022) ===
Mystery Road: Origin went to air on Sunday 3 July 2022 and ran until 7 August. All six episodes were made available on iview. The writers include Blake Ayshford, Steven McGregor, Kodie Bedford, Timothy Lee and Dylan River.

No. overall	No. in season	Title	Directed by	Written by	Original release date	Australian viewers
13	1	"Episode 1"	Dylan River	Blake Ayshford	3 July 2022	410,000
Newly qualified detective Jay arrives back in his hometown hoping to reconcile with his estranged father. He witnesses a robbery. A lawyer from out of town reads the police file for an unsolved murder. Jay meets his father in a bar which is held up.
14	2	"Episode 2"	Dylan River	Steven McGregor	10 July 2022	309,000
A cattle truck is stolen then dumped. Jay suspects the robberies are connected. The police raid a car scrapyard. There's a confrontation and a gang of neo-Nazis are arrested. Jay takes Mary and her family to the ball. His father should be there but doesn't turn up. Jay finds him dead.
15	3	"Episode 3"	Dylan River	Timothy Lee and Dylan River	17 July 2022	328,000
Jay thinks Jack was murdered. He finds a cannabis farm that Jack ran. Mary tells Anousha she feels guilty for her brother's death. Jay delivers the eulogy at Jack's funeral. Ziggy confesses to killing Joshua.
16	4	"Episode 4"	Dylan River	Kodie Bedford and Steven McGregor	24 July 2022	302,000
Ziggy is held in custody. Lucas escapes. Jay thinks Jack and Sputty were involved in fraud as part of government works contracts. Xavier holds up Max. Police go to an incident at a brothel and find Lucas there.
17	5	"Episode 5"	Dylan River	Blake Ayshford and Dylan River	31 July 2022	305,000
Gerry's house is ransacked. Jay realises the gang have been protesting about a massacre of aborigines. Anousha notices a photo of Abe in police uniform. Peter tells Jay off and he resigns.
18	6	"Episode 6"	Dylan River	Blake Ayshford and Dylan River	7 August 2022	263,000
Jay intervenes in another robbery. Anousha has disappeared. Mary gets a lift from Rex and he kidnaps her. Jay stops him and senses something is wrong. Rex has been killing troublemakers and dumping their bodies in an old mine. Mary finds Anousha. Peter was involved in the fraud. Jay arrests him and Paddy. Jay asks Mary if she wants to come with him on his new posting.

=== Season 2 (2025) ===
Season 2 of Mystery Road: Origin went to air on Sunday 21 September 2025 and ran until 26 October. All six episodes were made available on iview.

No. overall	No. in season	Title	Directed by	Written by	Original release date	Australian viewers
19	1	"Episode 1"	Wayne Blair	Steven McGregor	21 September 2025	N/A
20	2	"Episode 2"	Wayne Blair	Jada Alberts	28 September 2025	N/A
21	3	"Episode 3"	Jub Clerc	Erica Glynn	5 October 2025	N/A
22	4	"Episode 4"	Jub Clerc	Samuel Paynter	12 October 2025	N/A
23	5	"Episode 5"	Wayne Blair	Gary Hamaguchi	19 October 2025	N/A
24	6	"Episode 6"	Jub Clerc	Steven McGregor	26 October 2025	N/A

== Production ==
=== Season 1 ===
Mystery Road: Origin was filmed in Western Australia, around Kalgoorlie, Boulder and Coolgardie.

Mark Coles Smith plays a younger version of Swan.

=== Season 2 ===
In June 2023, Mystery Road was renewed for a fourth series. It is another prequel series under the "Origin" title, and went to air from 21 September 2025.

Jub Clerc co-directed with Wayne Blair. Simkin and Jowsey again produced, while the executive producers were Ivan Sen, Brett Sleigh, and Rachel Okine.

Mystery Road: Origin was filmed in south-western Western Australia around Pemberton.

== Release ==
Season 2 premiered on Sunday 21 September 2025 at 8.15pm on ABC TV, with all episodes available to stream on ABC iview.

== Reception ==
=== Season 1 ===
In The Sydney Morning Herald, Kylie Northover gave Mystery Road: Origin a rating of five stars, while The Guardian gave it four (out of five).

=== Season 2 ===
Anne Rutherford of Australian Book Review gave season 2 of Mystery Road: Origin 4 out of 5 stars, writing: "The scripting in season two is a little more uneven than in earlier seasons – occasionally the dialogue is less nuanced and a few moments are overly reliant on the music to carry the dramatic impact – but, directed by Wayne Blair and Jub Clerc, the characterisation is strong and, as is usual for Bunya Productions, the casting and performances are superb". She singles out Robyn Malcolm (Sergeant Simmo), Aswan Reid (Swayze), Shantae Barnes-Cowan (Lana), and Luke Carroll (Joey) for extra praise.

== Awards and nominations ==
=== Season 1 ===
Season 1 of Mystery Road: Origin won an Equity Award for Most Outstanding Performance by an Ensemble in a Drama Series.

Other awards include:

Award	Category	Nominee	Result	Ref
12th AACTA Awards	Best Television Drama Series	David Jowsey, Greer Simpkin	Won	
12th AACTA Awards	Best Screenplay in Television	Episode 3 – Timothy Lee, Dylan River	Nominated	
12th AACTA Awards	Best Screenplay in Television	Episode 6 – Blake Ayshford, Steven McGregor, Dylan River	Nominated	
12th AACTA Awards	Best Lead Actor in a Television Drama	Mark Coles Smith	Won	
12th AACTA Awards	Best Lead Actress in a Television Drama	Tuuli Narkle	Won	
12th AACTA Awards	Best Guest or Supporting Actor in a Television Drama	Steve Bisley	Nominated	
12th AACTA Awards	Best Guest or Supporting Actor in a Television Drama	Daniel Henshall	Nominated	
12th AACTA Awards	Best Guest or Supporting Actress in a Television Drama	Hayley McElhinney	Nominated	
12th AACTA Awards	Best Direction in Drama or Comedy	Dylan River	Won	
12th AACTA Awards	Best Cinematography in Television	Tyson Perkins – Episode 3	Won	
12th AACTA Awards	Best Costume Design in Television	Terri Lamera – Episode 3	Nominated	
12th AACTA Awards	Best Editing in Television	Nicholas Holmes – Episode 3	Won	
12th AACTA Awards	Best Production Design in Television	Herbert Pinter – Episode 3	Nominated	
12th AACTA Awards	Best Original Music Score in Television	Vincent Goodyer – Episode 3	Nominated	
12th AACTA Awards	Best Sound in Television	Luke Mynott, Wes Chew, Trevor Hope, Dylan Barfield – Episode 3	Won	

== Home media ==
Series	Release date			
Series	Region 1/A (U.S.)	Region 2 (UK)	Region 4 (Australia)	Region 4 (New Zealand)
Season 1	13 December 2022	31 December 2022	31 August 2022	TBA

Key
= Indicates availability only on DVD
= Indicates availability on both DVD & Blu-ray
