= The Vision Splendid Outback Film Festival =

Australian film festival

The Vision Splendid Outback Film Festival is an Australian film festival held annually in late June in Winton, Queensland.

The nine day Festival is held in Central West Queensland, which has provided the setting of film and television productions such as The Proposition, Gone, Mystery Road, Goldstone, Texas Rising and Total Control. The Vision Splendid Outback Film Festival focuses exclusively on Australian films and is promoted as Australia's only outback film festival.

A proposal for a film festival in Winton akin to the Sundance Film Festival was first put forward by local publican Clive Kitchen in 2012 who saw the film industry as beneficial to Winton's economy. The idea received support from Winton Shire mayor Butch Lenton, Screen Australia's Gina Black and Mystery Road producer David Jowsey. Festival director, filmmaker and academic Dr Greg Dolgopolov was appointed the inaugural festival creative director. Mark Melrose was Festival Director from 2014 to 2022 before stepping down to take a position at Screen Queensland. Ash Burgess has run the Kolperi Outback Filmmaking Bootcamp every year of the Festival with students from Griffith Film School, UNSW, Beijing Film Academy and film schools from around the world.

With Lenton as the founding chairperson, The Vision Splendid Outback Film Festival was established as an incorporated not-for-profit organisation with the objectives of boosting cultural tourism, encouraging film production and investment and offering a curriculum for film students. Lenton died in 2017.

Plans for the inaugural festival were announced to the public in Winton in September 2013 at the Royal Theatre following the sold-out premiere Queensland premiere of Mystery Road, which was mostly filmed in the area.

Commencing on 27 June 2014 with a screening of The Slim Dusty Movie, The Vision Splendid Outback Film Festival was held for the first time over ten days, featuring 50 Australian films, many of them screened in the Royal Open Air Theatre which is one of two surviving open air theatres in Australia.

Since the first festival in 2014, The Vision Splendid Outback Film Festival has been held each year, usually during the winter school holidays in late June and early July.

In 2015, daytime screenings of films were relocated to the Winton Shire Hall following a fire just days before the festival which destroyed the Waltzing Matilda Centre where movies were scheduled to be shown in the Sarah Riley Theatre. With fears the fire could discourage people from attending the festival, Australian actor Michael Caton issued a plea for people to continue with their planned journey to Winton.

Although it was postponed until later in the year, the festival went ahead in 2020 despite the COVID-19 pandemic in Queensland and is believed to have been the only film festival held in Australia that year.

The 2021 event also proceeded despite the closure of state borders at short notice due to COVID-19 clusters forming in several states.

With the festival's success combined with the amount of productions shot in the area, there have been proposals to establish permanent filmmaking facilities in the town.

== Winton's Walk of Fame ==
Each year, the festival honours a person involved with the Australian film industry by revealing their name on a star on Winton's Walk of Fame located in Elderslie Street.

As of 2024, nine people have been inducted onto the Walk of Fame - Roy Billing, Ivan Sen, Margaret Pomeranz, Butch Lenton, Steve Le Marquand, David Gulpilil and Leah Purcell, Clive Kitchen and Simon Baker.
