= 5th Asia Pacific Screen Awards =

- Date: 2011
- Site: Australia

Highlights
- Best Film: A Separation
- Best Actor: Wang Baoqiang
- Best Actress: Nadezhda Markina
- Most nominations: Once Upon a Time in Anatolia (5)

The 5th Asia Pacific Screen Awards were held in 2011.

== Awards ==
Best Feature Film	Achievement in Directing
(Iran) A Separation: (Iran) Goodbye; (Turkey) Once Upon a Time in Anatolia; (India) Wedding Planners; (China) Let the Bullets Fly	(Turkey) Nuri Bilge Ceylan - Once Upon a Time in Anatolia: (Russia) Andrey Zvyagintsev - Elena; (Iran) Mohammad Rasoulof - Goodbye; (Iran) Asghar Farhadi - A Separation; (South Korea) Na Hong-jin - The Yellow Sea; (China) Jiang Wen - Let the Bullets Fly
Best Actor	Best Actress
(China) Wang Baoqiang - Mr. Tree: (Iran) Peyman Moaadi - A Separation; (Australia) Daniel Connors - Toomelah; (Samoa) Fa'afiaula Sagote - The Orator; (Israel) Sasson Gabai - Restoration	(Russia) Nadezhda Markina - Elena: (Iran) Leyla Zareh - Goodbye; (Egypt) Nahed El Sebai - Cairo 678; (Iran) Shayesteh Irani - Facing Mirrors; (Australia) Judy Davis - The Eye of the Storm
Best Screenplay	Best Cinematography
(Russia) Denis Osokin - Silent Souls: (South Korea) Yoon Sung-hyun - Bleak Night; (Turkey) Nuri Bilge Ceylan, Ercan Kesal, Ebru Ceylan - Once Upon a Time in Anatolia; (Iran) Asghar Farhadi - A Separation; (Russia) Aleksei Balabanov - The Stoker	(Turkey) Gökhan Tiryaki - Once Upon a Time in Anatolia: (Taiwan) Mark Lee Ping Bin - Norwegian Wood; (Russia) Yuri Klimenko - The Edge; (China) Sonthar Gyal - Old Dog; (Russia) Vladimir Bashta - Fortress of War
Best Animated Feature Film	Best Documentary Feature Film
(South Korea) Leafie, A Hen into the Wild: (Russia) The Ugly Duckling; (Japan) Children Who Chase Lost Voices; (Philippines) RPG Metanoia; (Singapore) Tatsumi	(Japan) I Was Worth 50 Sheep: (Iran) Amin; (India) Pink Saris; (India) Marathon Boy; (Georgia (country)) Bakhmaro
Best Youth Feature Film	UNESCO Award
(Azerbaijan) Buta: (Iran) Wind and Fog; (Australia) Red Dog; (China) 11 Flowers; (Taiwan) The Fourth Portrait; (Israel) The Flood	(Australia) Ivan Sen - Toomelah
FIAPF Award	Jury Grand Prize
(China) Zhang Yimou	(Turkey) Once Upon a Time in Anatolia: (Egypt) Cairo 678

=== Films and countries with multiple nominations ===
Films that received multiple nominations
Nominations	Film
5	Once Upon a Time in Anatolia
4	A Separation
3	Goodbye
2	Cairo 678
2	Elena
2	Let the Bullets Fly
2	Toomelah

Countries that received multiple nominations
Awards	Country
10	Iran
6	China
6	Russia
5	Turkey
4	Australia
3	India
3	South Korea
2	Egypt
2	Israel
2	Japan
2	Taiwan
