= Crown Australian Celebrity Poker Challenge =

- Genre: Game show
- Presented by: Sophie Falkiner
- Narrated by: Paul Khoury; Clinton Grybas
- Country of origin: Australia
- Original language: English
- No. of seasons: 1
- No. of episodes: 10

Production
- Production location: Crown Casino
- Running time: 2 hours

Original release
- Network: FOX8
- Release: 5 January – 9 March 2006

Crown Australian Celebrity Poker Challenge is an Australian celebrity game show produced by Foxtel, which premiered 5 January 2006 on Australian pay TV channel FOX8. The limited run, 10-part series consisted of 36 Australian celebrities, all playing No Limit Texas Hold 'em poker, for the chance to win up to $50,000 in prize money, and $50,000 for their nominated charity. The show was hosted by former Australian Wheel of Fortune hostess Sophie Falkiner, and was recorded at Melbourne's Crown Casino in front of a live studio audience. Paul Khoury and Clinton Grybas provided the color commentary, with a running time of two hours per episode.

The grand final ended on 9 March 2006, with MTV Australia VJ Jason Dundas defeating The Weather Channel's Sally Bowrey to win the tournament and $100,000 total in prize money.

== Celebrities ==
Featured celebrities for the 2006 season included:

- Bessie Bardot
- Natalie Blair
- Sally Bowrey
- Beau Brady
- Paul Briggs
- Simon Burke
- Tiffany Cherry
- Jason Dundas
- Penne Dennison
- Sarah Davies
- Nick Dal Santo
- Benny Elias
- Rob Elliott
- Andrew Ettingshausen
- Candice Falzon
- Shane Heal
- Melissa Hoyer
- Robby Ingham
- Cameron Knight
- Cassie Lane
- Daniel MacPherson
- Colette Mann
- Simon Marshall
- David Mathew
- Greg Mathew
- Molly Meldrum
- Brendan Moar
- Peter Morrissey
- Rhys Muldoon
- Lauren Newton
- Aaron Pedersen
- Wayne Pearce
- Heath Scotland
- Jon Stevens
- Peter Timbs
- Krista Vendy
