= Ambridge =

Ambridge may refer to:

- Ambridge (The Archers), a fictional place in the UK radio programme, The Archers
- Ambridge, Indiana, a former neighborhood, now part of Ambridge Mann, Indiana, US
  - Ambridge station, a former railway station in Ambridge Mann
- Ambridge, Pennsylvania, a borough in the US
- Ambridge, Wisconsin, an unincorporated community in the US
- American Bridge Company

== People with the surname ==
- Cameron Ambridge (born 1978), Australian stunt performer
