= Sophie Falkiner =

Australian television presenter

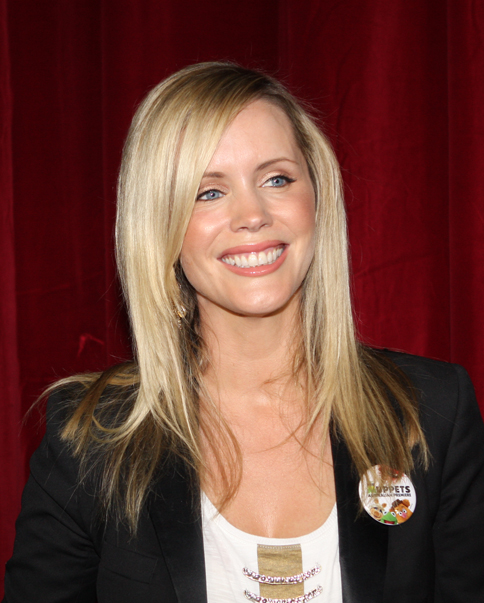
- Falkiner in 2011
- Born: 20 March 1973 (age 53); Melbourne, Victoria, Australia
- Occupation: Television presenter
- Years active: 1992–present
- Spouse: Tony Thomas (m. 2001; div. 2015) Steve Wood (m. 2024)
- Children: 2

Sophie Falkiner (born 20 March 1973) is an Australian television presenter.

Sophie has previously presented an entertainment news series Confidential on Fox8. She was also a presenter on The Great Outdoors and letter-turner on Wheel of Fortune with Rob Elliott and Steve Oemcke.

Falkiner's big break on Wheel of Fortune came after completing a Bachelor of Media Studies (majoring in journalism) at Macquarie University. In addition to hosting Sydney Weekender and Luxury Escapes, she also hosted Crown Australian Celebrity Poker Challenge. She also worked as a research assistant for Today Tonight.

Sophie also works- as a spokesmodel, having represented Berlei and Wonderbra in Australia and has appeared on the covers of various Australian magazines. She also featured in a series of ads for Neutrogena. Sophie is also an advocate for the online health and wellness market place Inner Origin.

Falkiner has appeared on Sunrise and filled in for Kerri-Anne Kennerley on Kerri-Anne.

== Personal life ==
She announced her split from former husband Tony Thomas in November 2015, who she shares two children with.

She married her partner, Steve Wood, in November 2024, after three years of dating.
