= Dead Heart =

- Directed by: Nick Parsons
- Written by: Nick Parsons
- Based on: Play by Nick Parsons
- Starring: Bryan Brown; Ernie Dingo; David Gulpilil; Aaron Pedersen; John Jarratt; Angie Milliken
- Release dates: 1996 (AUS); 1997 (US)
- Country: Australia
- Language: English
- Box office: A$518,203 (Australia)

Dead Heart is a 1996 Australian film. It was written and directed by Nick Parsons, and starred Bryan Brown, Angie Milliken, Ernie Dingo, Aaron Pedersen and John Jarratt. As a play, the piece was staged by Belvoir St Theatre, directed by Neil Armfield, at the Eveleigh rail yards, Sydney, in 1994. In 1993, the play received the NSW Premier's Literary Award for a play.

== Story arc ==
The story is set in the isolated Outback, mainly Aboriginal town of Wala Wala, where an Aboriginal man is found dead in the local police lock up. The film explores the strained and complex relations between the people of the town in the aftermath, amidst growing tensions of forbidden love, sacrilege and murder. Bryan Brown plays the hardboiled local policeman and Ernie Dingo plays the idealistic local Aboriginal Christian pastor. Each of the characters is confronted with how to reconcile Aboriginal tradition with contemporary Australia.

== Cast ==
- Bryan Brown as Ray Lorkin
- Ernie Dingo as David / Pastor
- David Gulpilil as Second Man in Desert
- Aaron Pedersen as Tony
- John Jarratt
- Angie Milliken as Kate / Les's wife
- Marshall Napier as Sgt. Oakes

== Production ==
Nick Parsons wrote a script called Dead Heart based on the true story of an Aboriginal who killed someone in the 1930s for traditional reasons. Parsons was not happy with it but decided to rewrite the story as a play when he attended National Institute of Dramatic Art (NIDA). He went up to the outback for five weeks to do research, and the resulting play was very popular. Bryan Brown read the original draft and wanted to produce it.

== Awards ==
The film gained three Australian Film Institute Awards nominations: "Best Achievement in Sound", "Best Original Music Score" and "Best Screenplay, Adapted".

The film won the Film Critics Circle of Australia Award for "Best Screenplay".

== Box office ==
Dead Heart was not as successful in the US or UK. In Australia, it grossed roughly $A500,000.

== See also ==
- Cinema of Australia
