= David Jowsey =

Australian film producer

- Born: Auckland, New Zealand
- Education: Auckland University
- Occupation: Film producer
- Years active: 1987–present
- Organization: Bunya Productions
- Spouse: Greer Simpkin

David Jowsey is an Australian film producer, co-founder of Bunya Productions. He is known for producing many films made by Indigenous Australian filmmakers. Bunya Productions' co-owners are Indigenous filmmaker Ivan Sen, and Jowsey's wife Greer Simpkin.

== Early life and education ==
Jowsey was born in Auckland, New Zealand. His mother used to take him to the cinema a lot, and he developed a deep love of storytelling and films as a child. At Auckland University, he ran a drama group, which led to a job at TVNZ.

== Career ==
In his work at TVNZ, he worked for some time in the Māori department, and developed an affinity for telling Indigenous stories. He was on the production team for the first episode of Waka Huia, which went to air in 1987. This is a long-running TV series aiming to record and preserve Māori culture and customs as well as covering social and political concerns, and presented completely in te reo Māori (language).

Moving to Australia, Jowsey married an Aboriginal woman who was a dancer with Bangarra Dance Theatre. They were married for many years, and have a son, whom he describes as a Murri (Queensland Aboriginal) person. The family connections taught him much about Aboriginal culture and political issues.

In 1989 he and fellow expatriate New Zealander Ron Roger, in a company called Platypus Films, received a script grant to make a film called Kilpara (aka Bilyara), to be written by Brian Syron and Vivian Walker. However, Walker died unexpectedly and the script was never progressed any further. Jowsey was a lecturer at Australian Film, Television and Radio School (AFTRS) as well as being employed by the ABC.

He went to work with Central Australian Aboriginal Media Association (CAAMA) in Alice Springs for two years, where he was manager in around 1997. At the time, CAAMA had a music studio, film production company, radio station as well as TV station (Imparja). Jowsey ran the video section and made many friends and lifelong connections in the industry, including Erica Glynn, Steven McGregor, Danielle MacLean, Warwick Thornton, Rachel Perkins, and many others, who continue to collaborate.

In the 2000s Jowsey worked as commissioning editor and executive producer for twelve years at ABC Television, where he learnt much about television production. He oversaw a great number of television programs, including live entertainment and special events; magazine series; music programs; drama; as well as more than 100 documentaries and documentary series.

When working at the ABC, Jowsey commissioned a film by Indigenous writer and director Ivan Sen called Beneath Clouds (released in 2002), which was very successful. The pair also made a number of TV documentaries together.

== Bunya Productions ==
=== Formation and focus ===
After working together at the ABC, Sen and Jowsey decided that they wanted to make feature fiction films together, so they left the ABC and set up Bunya Productions. The name originates with both men's family connections to Queensland groups of Aboriginal people who had cultural ties to the Bunya Mountains in south-east Queensland (SEQ). Before colonisation, Aboriginal people from all over SEQ would gather for a big festival every three years, when the bunya pine fruited.

Bunya is known for mixing genres, and films which have an Indigenous perspective. The company has hosted development workshops for emerging filmmakers, with Netflix and Screen Australia. In recent years it has also been building its sales, marketing, and distribution capacity.

=== People ===
Greer Simpkin, also a New Zealander, earned a Graduate Certificate in Business Administration (Creative Industries) from AFTRS in 2010. She had extensive experience at the ABC in television before joining the company in 2015. Among other productions, she worked on The Slap (2011) and Jack Irish (2012–2021). She is Jowsey's wife.

As of 2022, Jowsey continues to run Bunya Productions along with Sen and Simpkin, co-managing director and head of television.

=== Films ===
In the beginning Sen and Jowsey concentrated on frugality, having estimated that they could survive by making a low-budget film each year. Their first film was a sci fi film shot black and white in Arizona, called Dreamland (2009), which was self-funded.

In 2011, the company had films selected in both Sundance and Cannes Film Festivals. One of these was Mad Bastards, made with Brendan Fletcher, with the highlight being the soundtrack made with The Pigram Brothers. The other film was Sen's film Toomelah, a documentary about the former Aboriginal mission called Toomelah in northern New South Wales, where Sen's family grew up, which was screened at Un Certain Regard at Cannes as well as garnering the Cultural Diversity Award under the Patronage of UNESCO at the Asia Pacific Screen Awards.

Jowsey also produced Satellite Boy in 2011, (released 2012), directed by Catriona McKenzie. The film was selected for screening at the Toronto International Film Festival, and earned a Special Mention at its European premiere in the Generation section of the 2013 Berlin Film Festival.

Sen and Jowsey made their first big hit with Mystery Road, released in 2013, from which arose a television series of the same name from 2018 onwards. In 2014, Jowsey characterised Sen as the creative leader, but also very technically-minded, while he (Jowsey) looked after the business end, managing the bureaucracy involved in getting films funded. They lived in separate locations.

In 2016 Jowsey produced Jasper Jones, directed by Rachel Perkins.

Greer and Jowsey produced Wolfram, Warwick Thornton's 2025 follow-up to Sweet Country, which premieres on the closing night of the Adelaide Film Festival on 26 October 2025.

=== Dark Matter ===
The distribution arm of the company is Dark Matter.

== Recognition and awards ==
Nicholas Godfrey, senior lecturer in screen at Flinders University in Adelaide, wrote that Jowsey "is one of the most influential figures in shaping Australia's screen landscape over the last decade", and, of Bunya, "Few production companies have contributed as consistently to the development of Australian screen culture in recent years".

Many films and television series produced by Bunya have won awards, including:

- Sweet Country (2017), Best Film at the 8th AACTA Awards
- Mystery Road TV series, AACTA Award for Best Television Drama Series in 2018

In September 2022, Jowsey was the recipient of the Don Dunstan Award, awarded by the Adelaide Film Festival, for his contribution to Australian screen culture.

== Notable productions ==
- Mystery Road, (both the 2013 film and several seasons of the TV series, which began in 2018)
- Goldstone (2016, dir. Sen)
- Sweet Country (2017), made by Warwick Thornton, Steve McGregor, David Tranter and other old friends from CAAMA days
- The Drover's Wife: The Legend of Molly Johnson (2021, dir. Leah Purcell)
- Loveland (2022, dir. Sen)
- Limbo (2023, dir. Ivan Sen)
- Prima Facie (2026, dir. Susanna White)
