= Jada Alberts =

Australian writer, actor and artist

- Occupations: Actor, playwright, director
- Known for: Mystery Road; Cleverman; The Brothers Wreck (play)
- Partner: Kate Box (2009–present)
- Children: 3

Jada Alberts is an Aboriginal Australian actor, playwright, screenwriter, director, artist and poet. They have written two plays, Brothers Wreck (first performed 2014) and Black Light (2026).

== Early life and education ==
Jada Alberts is from the Top End of Australia, of Larrakia, Yanuwa, Bardi, and Wardaman descent. Their mother is Franchesca Cubillo.

They attended Mary MacKillop College in the Adelaide suburb of Kensington from 1996 to 2001, and graduated from Adelaide Centre for the Arts in 2006.

== Career ==
Alberts works in many mediums: they are an actor, musician, painter, poet, and playwright. They have also written for the screen.

=== Stage ===
Alberts has regularly acted on stage since at least 2005, when they performed in two productions as a third-year student at the Adelaide Centre for the Arts. One of these was King Lear. In 2013–2014, Alberts took the role of Goneril in a touring production of The Shadow King, which "rework[ed] Shakespeare’s timeless tragedy King Lear as a sprawling, blood-soaked tale of two Indigenous families in Australia's north".

Alberts performed in Frost/Nixon and The Birthday Party for Melbourne Theatre Company; Second to None, for Vitalstatistix and Kurruru Performing Arts; Cat (Windmill Theatre); Yibiyung (Company B / Malthouse Theatre); Wulamanayuwi and the Seven Pamanui (Darwin Festival); The Green Sheep (Cate Fowler); and several tours, both within Australia and overseas, of Saltbush (Insight Arts). In 2013 they were in This Heaven (Company B); and Hipbone Sticking Out (YijilaYala/Big hART).

Alberts was assistant director of Windmill Baby for Company B in 2011. They have been involved in various projects for Melbourne Workers Theatre, Arena Theatre Company, RealTV and State Theatre Company South Australia (STCSA).

They have also written for the stage, including the play Brothers Wreck, first performed in 2014 by Company B at the Belvoir Theatre in Sydney, directed by Leah Purcell, to critical acclaim. They then became associate artist at Belvoir. They wrote this play out of a desire after realising that there were few Indigenous Australians represented on TV and even fewer on the stage, and that suicides in the community were not being talked about. In 2018 Alberts directed the play for a collaborative production by Malthouse and STCSA, in their directorial debut, which was again well received. Many elements of the production were different, but Lisa Flanagan reprised her role as Petra.

In June 2023, Aretha – A Love Letter to the Queen of Soul, a tribute to American soul singer Aretha Franklin, opened at Sydney Opera House before heading to Brisbane and Melbourne. Alberts directed and narrated the musical, which featured Emma Donovan, Montaigne, Thandi Phoenix, Thndo, and Ursula Yovich, along with a nine-piece band. Alberts says that they have a special connection to Franklin's music, which they find very grounding: "Not only do I love Aretha's music and have been around it a lot in my life, but her music has also saved me at points in my life".

Alberts' new play, Black Light, had its world premiere at the Malthouse in February 2026, featuring sisters Rachael and Lisa Maza. Alberts also directed this production.

=== Screen ===
Alberts was a regular on Cleverman and a co-winner of the Outstanding Performance by an Ensemble in a Drama Series at the 2018 Equity Ensemble Awards. They also wrote for the series.

Alberts served as a writer on SBS series While the Men Are Away in 2023. In 2023, Alberts appeared in ABC series In Our Blood.

== Personal life ==
As of September 2020 Alberts is in a relationship with actress Kate Box, and they have three children together. They both appeared in prison drama series Wentworth.

Alberts is non-binary and gay and has stated a preference for using they/them pronouns. They have been diagnosed with complex post-traumatic stress disorder.

== Recognition and awards ==
- 2007: Winner, Adelaide Critics Circle Award for Best Emerging Artist, for What I Heard About Iraq (Holden Street Theatres)
- 2013: Recipient of the Balnaves Award, a fellowship to support an emerging First Nations playwright to create a new work at the Belvoir
- 2014: Nomination, Sydney Theatre Awards for Best New Australian Work, for Brothers Wreck
- 2015: Nomination for the Nick Enright Prize for Playwriting at the NSW Premier's Literary Awards, for Brothers Wreck
- 2015: Nomination, AWGIE Awards, Best Stage Play, for Brothers Wreck
- 2016: Winner, Early Career Writing Award in the inaugural Mona Brand Awards at the State Library of New South Wales (worth A$10,000)
- 2026: Shortlisted, Betty Roland Prize for Scriptwriting, NSW Premier's Literary Awards, for Mystery Road: Origin (season 2, episode 2)

== Filmography ==
Film and television appearances as an actor include:

TV/film
Year	Title	Role	Notes
2026	Two Years Later	Nat	TV series: 3 episodes
2023	In Our Blood	Deb Ferguson	4 episodes
2022	The Stranger	Detective Rylett	
2020	Mystery Road	Fran Davis	6 episodes
2017	Wake in Fright	Sandy Fanshawe	2 episodes
2016-17	Cleverman	Nerida West	12 episodes
2013-14	Wentworth	Toni Goodes	5 episodes
2012	Redfern Now	Marcia	1 episode
2010	Lil Larrakins	Jimmy	3 episodes
2010	Rush	Leanne Daly	1 episode
2010	Red Hill	Ellin Conway	
2008	The Hunter	Clare	Short
2005	The Hunter	Olivia	Short

Writer / Staff
Year	Title	Role	Notes
2026	Deadloch	script consultant	6 episodes
2025	Mystery Road: Origin	writer	1 episode
2023	While the Men are Away	Writer	
2017	Cleverman	Writer	2 episodes
