= Tomkins incident =

The Tomkins incident on 30 November 2004 was an attack by two white farmers on two Aboriginal boys found trespassing on their property near Goondiwindi, a town on the border of Queensland and New South Wales in Australia.

David and Clint Tomkins, a father and son managing the farm, allegedly beat Alan Boland and Bevan Bartman and dragged Boland around the property with a noose around his neck. The incident occurred just four days after the suspicious death in police custody of an Aboriginal man in the community of Palm Island that saw the island community riot.

The local Aboriginal community was outraged when the Tomkins were handed down a A$500 fine each for their treatment of the four boys, who themselves were charged with breaking, entering and theft. The event made headlines in countries around the world, including the UK.

== The assault ==
In November 2004, four Indigenous boys from the Toomelah Aboriginal Mission swam across the Macintyre River to a nearby Queensland property managed by David Hilary Tomkins (then 44 years old) and his son Clint Williams Tomkins (then 23 years old). The four boys, Alan Boland (16), Bevan "BJ" Bartman (19), Reg McGrady (23) and Jade, had said that they had previously bought marijuana from the Tomkins but had recently begun stealing it from the property instead.

The four boys broke into a building with the intention of stealing from a hydroponic crop inside, but were discovered by the Tomkins. McGrady and Jade escaped to the other side of the river, but the other two, Bartman and Boland, were caught by the Tomkins.

Bartman and Boland allege that the Tomkins pulled Boland back through the river, stripped him naked, bound his wrists and then dragged him up an embankment by a rope tied around his neck. They also allege the Tomkins tied Bartman to a tree and forced him to watch as they threatened to cut off Boland's toes with a pair of pliers and beat them both with sticks.

Bartman has said he managed to escape after he faked an asthma attack while he was being untied from the tree. He then ran back through the bush and swam across the river. Boland said the two Tomkins then walked into the farmhouse and returned with a double-barrelled shotgun and 0.22-calibre rifle, loaded both in front of Boland and pressed the guns to either side of his temples, yelled racist taunts and hammered the boy's face with their gun butts. The Tomkins called the police and allegedly removed the noose from Boland's neck before they arrived. The police took Boland to Goondiwindi police station and charged him with break and enter.

== Police behaviour ==
Boland's family have said the police questioned Boland for three hours until legal representation from Legal Aid arrived. The representative allegedly said that Boland was in no condition to give a statement, and ordered the boy be taken to hospital to be treated for his injuries, which he considered were extremely severe.

Boland's family have said Boland's face was bruised and swollen, he had suffered several cuts on his body from being dragged around and had rope burns around his neck. Boland's family have said Boland was still in shock and vomited repeatedly on the way to the hospital.

At the local Goondiwindi hospital a nurse attended Boland, but the doctor on duty refused to see him, despite the gravity of his injuries, according to Boland's family. At one stage Boland and one of the Tomkins, who had broken his arm in the fracas, were sitting together in the same treatment room. Boland was then taken by the police to a holding cell in Tenterfield.

== The prosecution ==
The court case was held on 18 May 2005. At 9.30 am, two hours before the case, the police prosecutor told Boland's mother Rosalyn, Toomelah elder Ada Jarrett and a Toowoomba Legal Aid representative that the Tomkins would only get a fine or a good behaviour bond, according to Mrs Boland and Jarrett.

According to Jarrett and Mrs Boland, a police sergeant and the prosecutor then repeatedly pressured them for another two hours to sign statements dropping the more serious charge of assault occasioning bodily harm in company, for which there is a maximum penalty of 10 years' jail. The sergeant and prosecutor claimed the Tomkins would walk free if Boland didn't arrive at the courthouse on time, said Jarrett and Mrs Boland.

== The verdict ==
A large number of indigenous relatives and residents from Toomelah, Boggabilla and Moree had turned up to witness the court's proceedings, as had "Sugar" Ray Robinson, former deputy chairman of the Aboriginal and Torres Strait Islander Commission. Local Aboriginal leader Bert Button said the charge of assault causing bodily harm in company was an outrage. He demanded the two men be given murder charges.

At the hearing, held before magistrate Dennis Beutel, the Tomkins pleaded guilty to common assault. The prosecutor representing the four Toomelah boys did not produce photographs of the boys' injuries nor use their testimonies, according to Jarrett. The prosecutor also failed to mention the drugs on the Tomkins' property.

The UK's Daily Telegraph reported that the Tomkins' defence lawyer, Robbie Davis, had said his clients had become fed up with frequent break-ins on the farm and that they had used "reasonable force" to restrain Boland. Davis said the Tomkins were wrong to tie a noose around Boland's neck. "It's a pity they didn't have the hindsight [sic] to put a rope around his waist and not his neck," he told the court. "This is not a racial event. It would have been the same if it had been a white youth." The Tomkins were fined A$500 each, and ordered to pay A$300 each to the victim. For a common assault charge, up to three years imprisonment is possible.

Outside the court house, the victims' relatives were outraged and began yelling abuse at the police and the Tomkins, who were led out under heavy police guard. Protesters waved placards declaring "One law for whites and one law for blacks – still" and "This is KKK land". The police had already called in a number of extra squad cars and reinforcements, including a SWAT team that was stationed around the courthouse.

ATSIC's Robinson called on Queensland Premier Peter Beattie to investigate the case and the actions of the police. Local leader Bert Button said, "The justice system stinks. It's saying it's all right for non-Indigenous people to go and put a rope around someone's neck and drag them up and down a river and give them a flogging." The Tomkins spent the night under police protection.

== Aftermath ==
There was no appeal brought against the criminal case decision by the victims.

After the guilty verdict David Tomkins told the Seven Network that he would do it again if confronted with the same situation. He said it was the third time in two years that his home had been broken into, and that he only wanted to detain Boland, according to an AAP report. "My proud home keeps getting broken into and robbed," said Tomkins. "All I did was detain one of the criminals for the police."

== See also ==
- Racism in Australia
