= Mystery Road (TV series) =

Australian television series

- Promotional poster for Series One featuring Aaron Pedersen and Judy Davis
- Genre: Crime; Mystery; Neo-noir; Drama
- Written by: Michaeley O'Brien; Steven McGregor; Kodie Bedford; Timothy Lee
- Directed by: Rachel Perkins (Season 1); Warwick Thornton (Season 2); Wayne Blair (Season 2)
- Starring: Aaron Pedersen; Tasma Walton; Tasia Zalar; Season 1: Judy Davis; Deborah Mailman; Colin Friels; Wayne Blair; Anthony Hayes; Ernie Dingo; John (Russell) Waters; Aaron McGrath; Madeleine Madden; Kris McQuade; Meyne Wyatt; Ningali Lawford Wolf; Season 2: Jada Alberts; Callan Mulvey; Rob Collins; Gary Sweet; Ursula Yovich; Sofia Helin
- Country of origin: Australia
- Original language: English
- No. of series: 2
- No. of episodes: 12

Production
- Executive producers: Ivan Sen; Sally Riley; Kym Goldsworthy
- Producers: David Jowsey; Greer Simpkin
- Production locations: Wyndham, Kununurra, Western Australia
- Running time: 57 minutes
- Production companies: Bunya Productions; Golden Road Productions

Original release
- Network: ABC TV
- Release: 3 June 2018 – 24 May 2020

Related
- Mystery Road; Goldstone; Mystery Road: Origin

Mystery Road is an Australian television crime mystery series whose first series screened on ABC TV from 3 June 2018. The series is a spin-off from Ivan Sen's feature films Mystery Road and Goldstone. Aboriginal Australian detective Jay Swan, played by Aaron Pedersen, is the main character and actor in both the films and in the first two TV series, each of six episodes. Mystery Road: Origin, in which Mark Coles Smith plays a younger version of Swan, is a prequel series, which aired from 3 July 2022.

Season 1 was directed by Rachel Perkins. Swan is brought in to solve a murder, with the local police officer played by Judy Davis. In Season 2, directed by Warwick Thornton and Wayne Blair, which began airing on the ABC on 19 April 2020, Swan is brought in to solve a murder in a different location, with the "local copper" this time played by Jada Alberts. Both series were shot in northern Western Australia.

== Plot ==
=== Season 1 ===
Post Mystery Road (2013 film).

Taking place between the events of the films Mystery Road and Goldstone, Mystery Road Season 1 tells the story of Detective Jay Swan (Aaron Pedersen), assigned to investigate the mysterious disappearance of two young farmhands on an outback cattle station, one a local Indigenous football hero and the other a white backpacker. Working together with local police sergeant Emma James (Judy Davis), the investigation uncovers drug trafficking in the town, and a past injustice that threatens the fabric of the whole community.

=== Season 2 ===
Post Mystery Road (2013 film)

Jay Swan has to unravel the mystery of a decapitated body which turns up in the mangroves, outside the town of Broome. The plot involves drug trafficking and an archaeological dig which discovered the dead body. Swan's ex Mary is involved with an undercover drug runner, placing her in extreme danger.

== Cast ==
=== Main ===
- Aaron Pedersen as Jay Swan
- Tasma Walton as Mary Swan
- Tasia Zalar as Shevorne Shields

=== Season 1 ===
- Judy Davis as Emma James
- Wayne Blair as Larry Dime
- Aaron McGrath as Marley Thompson
- Deborah Mailman as Kerry Thompson
- Madeleine Madden as Crystal Swan
- Meyne Wyatt as Cedric Thompson
- Colin Friels as Tony Ballantyne
- Rohan Mirchandaney as David Sharma
- Anthony Hayes as Ryan Muller
- Ernie Dingo as Keith Groves
- John Waters as Travis James
- Kris McQuade as Liz Rutherford
- Ningali Lawford Wolf as Dot
- Connor Van Vuuren as Reese Dale
- Ben Oxenbould as Vince Pearce
- Benjamin Hoetjes as Eric Hoffman
- Jessica Falkholt as Genevieve Leclaire
- Eddie Baroo as Tyson Zein

=== Season 2 ===
- Jada Alberts as Fran Davis
- Callan Mulvey as Simon
- Rob Collins as Amos
- Gary Sweet as Alkemi
- Ursula Yovich as Pansy
- Sofia Helin as Sandra Elmquist
- Ngaire Pigram as Leonie
- Mark Mitchinson as Owen
- Stan Yarramunua as Jimmy 2
- Rhimi Johnson as Phillip
- Keith Robinson as Reverend Tom
- Fletcher Humphrys as Dylan Lindwall
- Kirk Page as Suzi-John
- Eve Morey as Kayla
- John Brumpton as Hegarty
- Joel Jackson as McBride
- Simon Lyndon as Emilio Gordon
- Brandon Walters as Shaney

== Episodes ==
| Series | Episodes | Originally released | |
| Series | Episodes | First released | Last released |
|---|---|---|---|
| 1 | 6 | 3 June 2018 | 1 July 2018 |
| 2 | 6 | 19 April 2020 | 24 May 2020 |

=== Season 1 (2018) ===
| No. overall | No. in season | Title | Directed by | Written by | Original release date | Australian viewers |
|---|---|---|---|---|---|---|
| 1 | 1 | "Gone" | Rachel Perkins | Michaeley O'Brien | 3 June 2018 | 786,000 |
| 2 | 2 | "Blood Ties" | Rachel Perkins | Kodie Bedford | 3 June 2018 | 786,000 |
| 3 | 3 | "Chasing Ghosts" | Rachel Perkins | Michaeley O'Brien | 10 June 2018 | 600,000 |
| 4 | 4 | "Silence" | Rachel Perkins | Steven McGregor | 17 June 2018 | 604,000 |
| 5 | 5 | "The Waterhole" | Rachel Perkins | Timothy Lee | 24 June 2018 | 525,000 |
| 6 | 6 | "The Truth" | Rachel Perkins | Steven McGregor | 1 July 2018 | 572,000 |

=== Season 2 (2020) ===
Season 2 began screening on ABC in April 2020. It had its world premiere at the 70th Berlin International Film Festival in late February, in the new Series section devoted to longform television series, along with another ABC series, Stateless.

| No. overall | No. in season | Title | Directed by | Written by | Original release date | Australian viewers |
|---|---|---|---|---|---|---|
| 7 | 1 | "The Road" | Warwick Thornton | Steven McGregor | 19 April 2020 | 655,000 |
| 8 | 2 | "The Flare" | Wayne Blair | Blake Ayshford | 26 April 2020 | 576,000 |
| 9 | 3 | "Artefacts" | Wayne Blair | Timothy Lee | 3 May 2020 | 576,000 |
| 10 | 4 | "Broken" | Wayne Blair | Kodie Bedford | 10 May 2020 | 576,000 |
| 11 | 5 | "To Live with the Living" | Warwick Thornton | Danielle MacLean | 17 May 2020 | 572,000 |
| 6 | 6 | "What You Do Now" | Warwick Thornton | Steven McGregor, Blake Ayshford | 24 May 2020 | 583,000 |

== Production ==
=== Season 1 ===
The first series was made on location in and around Wyndham, a town in northern Western Australia. Other scenes were shot at Kununurra and on Aboriginal lands belonging to the Miriuwung, Gajerrong and Balanggarra in the Kimberley. Location shooting took approximately 10 weeks.

=== Season 2 ===
The second series was filmed in Broome, and in the Kimberley in northern Western Australia, taking 10 weeks. It was Thornton's first time directing for television, and he said that Blair's experience in this medium was vital. He also said that Sen and Perkins had done the hard work creating "this unique world", which gave the directors of Season 2 a strong foundation, so they could focus on the performances.

== Reception ==
=== Critical reception ===
Season 1

Season 2

The Guardian reviewer Luke Buckmaster praised the "extraordinary breadth" of the show, in the way it portrays the country "only just beginning to come to terms with its past". He praised Pedersen's performance, which "simultaneously [projects] great strength and great sorrow", as a man "caught between traditions, between worldviews, between laws and lores".

=== Viewing figures ===
Mystery Road: Origin season 1 was the most watched program on ABC iView since its launch 18 years earlier.

== Awards and nominations ==
Seasons 1 and 2 of Mystery Road won an Equity Award for Most Outstanding Performance by an Ensemble in a Drama Series.

=== Season 1-2 ===
| Award | Category | Nominee | Result | Ref |
|---|---|---|---|---|
| 8th AACTA Awards | Best Television Drama Series | David Jowsey, Greer Simpkin | Won | |
| 8th AACTA Awards | Best Screenplay in Television | Episode 5: The Waterhole – Timothy Lee, Kodie Bedford, Steven McGregor, Michaeley O'Brien | Nominated | |
| 8th AACTA Awards | Best Lead Actor in a Television Drama | Aaron Pedersen | Nominated | |
| 8th AACTA Awards | Best Lead Actress in a Television Drama | Judy Davis | Nominated | |
| 8th AACTA Awards | Best Guest or Supporting Actor in a Television Drama | Wayne Blair | Won | |
| 8th AACTA Awards | Best Guest or Supporting Actress in a Television Drama | Deborah Mailman | Won | |
| 8th AACTA Awards | Best Guest or Supporting Actress in a Television Drama | Tasma Walton | Nominated | |
| 8th AACTA Awards | Best Direction in Television | Rachel Perkins – Episode 4: Silence | Nominated | |
| 8th AACTA Awards | Best Cinematography in Television | Mark Wareham – Episode 4: Silence | Nominated | |
| 8th AACTA Awards | Best Editing in Television | Deborah Peart – Episode 5: The Waterhole | Won | |
| 8th AACTA Awards | Best Original Music Score in Television | Antony Partos, Matteo Zingales – Episode 4: Silence | Won | |
| The Logies 2019 | Most Popular Drama Program | Mystery Road | Won | |
| The Logies 2019 | Most Popular Actress | Deborah Mailman | Won | |
| The Logies 2019 | Most Popular Actor | Aaron Pedersen | Nominated | |
| The Logies 2019 | Most Popular New Talent | Tasia Zalar | Nominated | |
| The Logies 2019 | Most Outstanding Actor | Aaron Pedersen | Nominated | |
| The Logies 2019 | Most Outstanding Actress | Judy Davis | Nominated | |
| The Logies 2019 | Most Outstanding Supporting Actor | Wayne Blair | Nominated | |
| The Logies 2019 | Most Outstanding Drama Series | Mystery Road | Nominated | |
| Australian Directors' Guild Awards | Best director in a television drama series | Rachel Perkins | Won | |
| ARIA Awards | Best Original Soundtrack, Cast or Show Album | Mystery Road (Matteo Zingales & Antony Partos) | Nominated | |

== Home media ==
| Series | Release date | | | |
| Series | Region 1/A (U.S.) | Region 2 (UK) | Region 4 (Australia) | Region 4 (New Zealand) |
|---|---|---|---|---|
| Season 1 | 26 February 2019 | 8 October 2018 | 15 August 2018 | 3 October 2018 |
| Season 2 | 5 January 2021 | 5 October 2020 | 5 August 2020 | TBA |

Key
= Indicates availability only on DVD
= Indicates availability on both DVD & Blu-ray
