= Cameron Ambridge =

Australian stuntman

Cameron Ambridge (born 28 May 1978) is an Australian stuntman in the film and television industry.

== Life and career ==
Cameron was born in Brisbane and grew up in the country town of Beaudesert, later moving to the Gold Coast where he worked at Movieworld in the Police Academy Stunt Show and the Hollywood Stunt Driver Show.

Cameron is most known for his work on Mad Max: Fury Road, The Hangover Part II and Superman Returns.

On Mad Max: Fury Road he was the stunt double for Hugh Keays-Byrne as Immortan Joe driving the infamous Gigahorse and more recently the stunt double for Kevin McNally as Gibbs on Pirates of the Caribbean: Dead Men Tell No Tales.

He won a Screen Actors Guild Award for Outstanding Performance by a Stunt Ensemble in a motion picture.

== Filmography ==
- Alien: Covenant directed by Ridley Scott
- Hacksaw Ridge directed by Mel Gibson
- Goldstone directed by Ivan Sen
- Pirates of the Caribbean: Dead Men Tell No Tales directed by Joachim Rønning and Espen Sandberg
- Mad Max: Fury Road directed by George Miller
- Superman Returns directed by Bryan Singer
