= Fire Talker =

- Directed by: Ivan Sen
- Starring: Charlie Perkins
- Release date: May 2009
- Country: Australia
- Language: English

Fire Talker is a 2009 documentary film by Australian filmmaker Ivan Sen. It is a documentary biopic about Aboriginal Australian political activist, footballer and administrator, Charlie Perkins. It premiered at the 10th Anniversary of the Message Sticks Indigenous Film Festival held at the Sydney Opera House in May 2009. This festival was curated by Perkins' daughter Rachel.
