= Paul Khoury =

Australian TV personality and voice actor

Paul Khoury is an Australian television personality and voice talent of Lebanese descent.

Khoury was bass guitarist in a Melbourne band called Gravel, before entering and winning the Cleo Bachelor of the Year award in 2002. He has had roles on Australian TV shows such as Blue Heelers.

In 2009, Khoury provided commentary for Fox8's Crown Australian Celebrity Poker Challenge, hosted Miss World Australia for the Seven Network, and his voice was his ticket to working with television legend Bert Newton as his voice-over and sidekick on Bert's Family Feud on the Nine Network. Khoury left the show to take up an international project for cable television.

He hosted the series Coffee Lovers’ Guide to Italy, which was shown in Australia on Foxtel's Lifestyle Channel and AFC (Asian Food Channel), and many countries around the world. Khoury is the lead anchor for the Asia Pacific Poker Tour series shown on ESPN and has also become a leading commentator in the international poker arena, working with 441 Productions in New York City. From 2010 to 2015, he hosted one of the richest poker events in the world, The Aussie Millions, which aired on GSN and ESPN in the United States.

Preceded by David Whitehill	Cleo Bachelor of the Year; 2002	Succeeded by Ryan Phelan
