= Confidential (TV series) =

- Genre: Entertainment News
- Starring: Sophie Falkiner; Mike Hammond; Jonathan Pease
- Country of origin: Australia
- No. of episodes: 13

Production
- Running time: 30 minutes (including commercials)

Original release
- Network: Fox8 (2007); Arena (2008-)
- Release: 6 June 2007

Confidential, a joint venture between Foxtel and News Limited, is an Australian weekly entertainment news show. Talking about the latest in Australian gossip and celebrities. The program is based on the highly successful Confidential column in News Limited newspapers around the country, and is Australia's answer to E! News. The program made its debut on 6 June 2007.

== Hosts and Reporters ==
=== Hosts ===
- Sophie Falkiner
- Mike Hammond
- Thomas Haynes
- Jonathan Pease

=== Reporters ===
The reporters are key News Limited Confidential reporters from newspapers around Australia.

The Daily Telegraph (Sydney)
Herald Sun (Melbourne)

- Chloe Adams
- Luke Dennehy
- Megan Miller

The Courier-Mail (Brisbane)
The Advertiser (Adelaide)
The Sunday Times (Perth)
