= Limbo (2023 film) =

2023 Australian film directed by Ivan Sen

- Official poster
- Directed by: Ivan Sen
- Written by: Ivan Sen
- Produced by: Ivan Sen; Elaine Crombie; Rachel Higgins; David Jowsey; Greg Simpkin
- Starring: Simon Baker; Rob Collins; Natasha Wanganeen
- Cinematography: Ivan Sen
- Edited by: Ivan Sen
- Music by: Ivan Sen
- Production companies: Bunya Productions; Windalong Films
- Distributed by: Dark Matter Distribution
- Release dates: February 23, 2023 (Berlinale); May 18, 2023 (Australia)
- Running time: 109 minutes
- Country: Australia
- Language: English
- Box office: $262,990

Limbo is a 2023 Australian independent mystery-crime film directed by Ivan Sen and featured production help from the main character, Simon Baker. The film also stars Rob Collins, Natasha Wanganeen and Nicholas Hope. The film had its world premiere in competition at the 73rd Berlin International Film Festival, on 23 February 2023, where it competed for Golden Bear.

== Synopsis ==
In a small Australian outback town named Limbo, detective Travis Hurley arrives to investigate a 20-year-old unsolved homicide of a young Aboriginal woman, Charlotte Hayes. The desolate region is pocked with caves, opal mines, and dusty unpaved roads. Hurley attempts to interview Charlotte's brother, Charlie, who excavates an opal mine, and her sister, Emma, who waitresses at a local café. Hurley is at first rebuffed by both Charlie and Emma, neither of whom seem inclined to cooperate with the re-opened investigation of their sister's murder. Eventually, they come to trust Hurley and share recollections which implicate Joseph, a debilitated elderly white man whose late brother, Leon, threw parties to attract young Black girls to his cave. Though some figures who were witnesses to the parties are now dead, others who still live in the area provide enough clues for Hurley to piece together a likely scenario about Charlotte's murder.

== Cast ==
- Simon Baker as Travis Hurley
- Rob Collins as Charlie
- Natasha Wanganeen as Emma
- Nicholas Hope as Joseph
- Mark Coe as Zac
- Joshua Warrior as Oscar
- Alexis Lennon as Jessie

== Production ==
Limbo was produced by Bunya Productions and Windalong Films, with the support of Screen Queensland, South Australian Film Corporation, and the Australian Broadcasting Corporation.

Filming began on 19 August 2022 at Coober Pedy in South Australia. The film was shot in black and white, partly for technical reasons, but mainly because of the large expanses of white ground at Coober Pedy, which provide a dramatic backdrop. Sen wrote the script based on his experience of the town, with its underground dwellings and unusual culture.

== Release ==
The film had its world premiere at the 73rd Berlin International Film Festival on 23 February 2023.

It premiered in Australian cinemas on 18 May 2023, and had its television premiere on ABC TV on 9 July 2023. It was invited to Horizons section of 57th Karlovy Vary International Film Festival, where it was screened on 30 June 2023. The film was also invited to the 2023 Toronto International Film Festival in centrepiece section.

The film was selected in country focus section 'Best of Contemporary Australian Cinema' at the 29th Kolkata International Film Festival and was screened on 6 December 2023. It will be showcased in February 2024 at the 39th Santa Barbara International Film Festival in 'Non Premiere Feature Films' section.

== Reception ==
On the review aggregator Rotten Tomatoes website, the film has an approval rating of 97% based on 33 reviews, with an average rating of 7.8/10. On Metacritic, it has a weighted average score of 76 out of 100 based on 6 reviews, indicating "generally favorable" reviews.

Peter Bradshaw of The Guardian rated the film with 4 stars out of 5 and wrote, "It is a tough, muscular film with the grit of crime, but a heartbeat of compassion." David Rooney for The Hollywood Reporter stating that the film is "A riveting, multilayered genre piece", concluded writing, "With its strikingly cinematic locations and Sen’s expressive use of the widescreen frame, Limbo also sneaks up on you, leaving a haunting impression." Guy Lodge reviewing at Berlin Film Festival, for Variety wrote, "This is outback noir — oblique, secretive and as hard-boiled as the ground is hard-baked — and Sen wears it well." Wendy Ide for ScreenDaily wrote in review that the film is "a distinctive work, both visually – the stark black and white photography accentuates the uncanny, almost lunar pockmarks on this scarred terrain – and in terms of its intriguingly detached outback noir storytelling."

== Accolades ==
Limbo' won the Jury Grand Prix, Best feature film, at the 2023 Rencontres internationales du cinéma des Antipodes (Antipodean Film Festival).

Award	Date	Category	Recipient	Result	Ref.
Berlin International Film Festival	26 February 2023	Golden Bear	Limbo	Nominated	
AACTA Awards	10 February 2024	Best Indie Film	Limbo	Won	
AACTA Awards	10 February 2024	Best Lead Actor	Simon Baker	Nominated	
AACTA Awards	10 February 2024	Best Supporting Actor	Rob Collins	Nominated	
