= The Opposition (film) =

The Opposition is a 2016 investigative documentary. directed by Hollie Fifer. The film follows Joe Moses as he struggles to save his community from policemen wielding machetes and guns descending on the Paga Hill Settlement in Papua New Guinea to bulldoze their houses to the ground.

The Opposition was produced by Madeleine Hetherton-Miau and Rebecca Barry from the production company Media Stockade.

The Opposition won the 2018 OzFlix Independent Film Awards and was nominated for ‘Best Documentary Feature Film’ at the 2017 Asia Pacific Screen Awards. The film was also awarded the Grand Prize of the Jury at the 2017 International Pacific Documentary Film Festival FIFO. In 2017, The Opposition was one of the finalists for ‘Feature Documentary of the Year’ at the Screen Producers Australia Awards.

== Festivals and awards ==
Festival/Award	Outcome	Year
IDFA	Official Selection	2016
HotDocs	Official Selection	2016
CPH:DOX	Official Selection	2017
DocEdge	Official Selection	2017
FIFO Tahiti	Official Selection	2017
International Human Rights Documentary Film Festival	Official Selection	2017
Sydney Film Festival	Official Selection	2017
Human Rights Human Wrongs Documentary Film Festival	Official Selection	2017
Human Rights, Arts and Film Festival	Official Selection	2017
Asia Pacific Screen Awards - Best Documentary Feature Film	Nominated	2017
Diritti Umani Lugano Film Festival	Official Selection	2017
Screen Producers Australia Awards - Feature Documentary of the Year	Finalist	2017
Ozflix Independent Film Awards	Winner	2018
