= Toomelah =

- Town
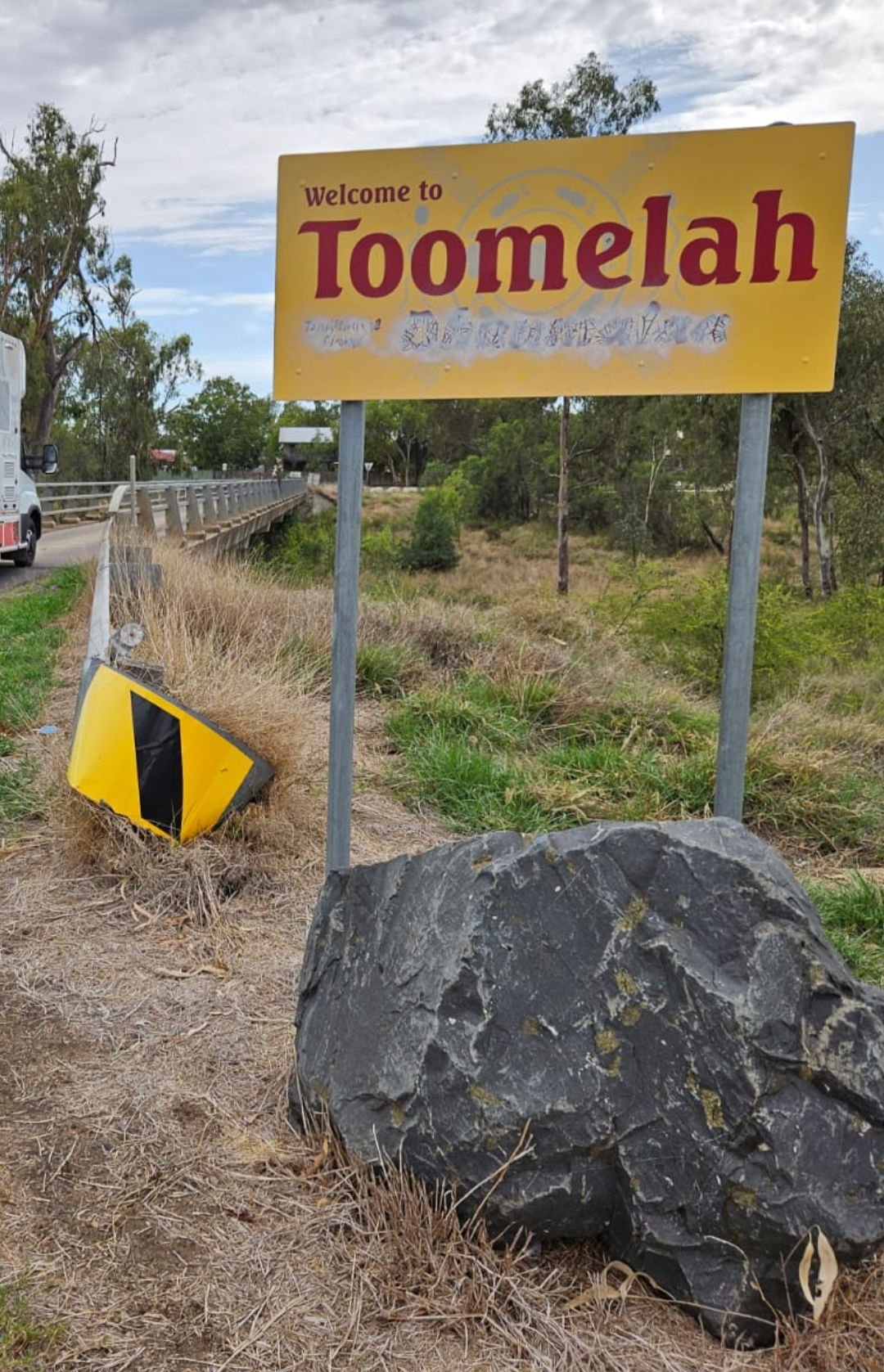
- Toomelah location sign, 2023

- Coordinates: 28°40′15″S 150°28′45″E
- Country: Australia
- State: New South Wales
- LGA: Moree Plains Shire
- Location: 720 km (450 mi) N of Sydney; 130 km (81 mi) NE of Moree; 25 km (16 mi) SE of Goondiwindi

Government
  - State electorate: Northern Tablelands
  - Federal division: Parkes
- Elevation: 230 m (750 ft)

Population
  - Total: 205 (2016 census)
- Postcode: 2409

Toomelah (formerly Toomelah Aboriginal Mission or Toomelah Station) is an Aboriginal Australian community in the far north of inland New South Wales, Australia.

== Location and governance ==
Toomelah is located north of Moree on the MacIntyre River and is close to the town of Goondiwindi across the border in Queensland.

It lies within the Boggabilla locality in Moree Plains Shire.

== History ==
The Toomelah Aboriginal Station was originally established as the Euraba Aboriginal Reserve in 1897 by the NSW Government's Aboriginal Protection Board. It was initially located on Whalan Creek a few miles south of the town of Boomi, New South Wales. The site was located in a wet-weather swamp and had poor access to potable water during dry periods. In 1925, the residents of the Euraba reserve, as well as Aboriginal people from the reserve at Terry Hie Hie, were moved to a new site halfway between the towns of Boomi and Boggabilla. This reserve was given the name Toomelah, but is now referred to as 'Old Toomelah'. In 1938, the water supply to this reserve failed and the Toomelah reserve was relocated to its present site at the junction of the Dumaresq River and the Macintyre River around 10 km south-east of Boggabilla.

=== Euraba ===
The Euraba Aboriginal Reserve was established in 1897 and consisted of a few huts and some rough shelters alongside Whalan Creek. In 1912, a school was established and the population of approximately 100 people was placed under the control of a government appointed manager. Rations of basic food items were handed out weekly. Aboriginal men on the reserve were utilised by local farmers for shearing, labouring and mustering. The Euraba men were also occasionally allowed to conduct exhibition corroborees and rugby league matches in neighbouring towns.

Three Aboriginal men from Euraba signed up as soldiers in WWI. Charles Bird, George Bennett and Jack Stacy fought in Western Europe and the Middle East. They all survived and returned as heroes with congratulation ceremonies being conducted in English and the Gamilaraay language.

During the 1918-20 influenza pandemic, most of the reserve fell sick. With no access medical facilities, the residents' only carers were the manager and school-teacher, Herbert E. Hockey, and his wife.

=== Old Toomelah ===
In 1925, the Euraba settlement was deemed unsuitable and the residents were moved to a new location halfway between the towns of Boomi and Boggabilla. It was named Toomelah but is now known as Old Toomelah. The local graziers requested that the site be enclosed in a dog-proof fence.

Around 200 to 250 Aboriginal people lived at Old Toomelah. In 1936, a major outbreak of conjunctivitis affected a majority of the children in the reserve. They were treated in tents outside Moree hospital with their parents being forced away to prevent the infection spreading to the white population.

=== Toomelah ===
In 1937, it was proposed by the NSW Aborigines Protection Board to move the Toomelah reserve to the banks of the Macintyre River near Boggabilla. The residents of Goondiwindi protested against the proposal, claiming that the Aborigines would pollute their water supply. The Queensland Health department also submitted a formal protest against it. The protests were ignored and around 200 Aboriginal people were moved to the new site in 1938. In response, the Goondiwindi hospital board refused to allow any Aboriginal people into Goondiwindi hospital as general patients.

Several Toomelah residents joined the army in the early 1940s to serve in WWII.

By the 1970s, the overcrowding and lack of basic facilities at Toomelah were starting to become public knowledge. Media attention focused on Toomelah in 1987 when a large brawl between hundreds of whites and Aboriginal people occurred outside the Victoria Hotel in Goondiwindi after a Toomelah resident was refused entry and beaten up. The incident resulted in several investigations revealing that the Toomelah community had no household water supply, no sewerage, poor housing, poor access to medical facilities, high rates of malnutrition and 80% unemployment. Strongly entrenched racism at Goondiwindi High School which prevented young residents from accessing education was also found.

Following a report by the Human Rights and Equal Opportunity Commission on the community in 1987, there was a public outcry over poor sanitation at Toomelah and action was taken to improve water and housing.

In 2004, the "Tomkins incident" made international headlines when farm employees David and Clint Tomkins caught a 16 year old Aboriginal boy from Toomelah breaking into a property located across the river from the settlement. They beat the boy, stripped him naked, tied a noose around his neck, dragged him around and put guns to his head threatening to shoot him. The Tomkins men were charged with assault and received small fines as punishment. This outcome highlighted issues of racism in the judicial system and caused outrage amongst the Aboriginal community.

In 2008 the Special Commission of Inquiry into Child Protection Services in New South Wales heard evidence of abuse and neglect of children at Toomelah.

A drama film about the settlement entitled Toomelah, directed by Ivan Sen, was released in 2011.

In May 2012 the ABC's 7.30 program ran a special report dealing with child abuse, housing and the collapse of social services in Toomelah. In August 2013 a house fire killed a 14-year-old girl while two other children managed to escape.

A specialised unit of the Australian Army was deployed in Toomelah in 2017 to run a six-month works project to restore infrastructure including roads and the community hall.

== Notable residents ==
Flight Sergeant Leonard Waters, the first Aboriginal air-force pilot and the only Aboriginal pilot allowed to serve in World War II, was born at the Euraba Aboriginal Reserve and spent part of his childhood at 'Old Toomelah'.

Madeline McGrady, pioneering Aboriginal film-maker.

Singer/songwriter Roger Knox is from Toomelah.

In 1994, the Toomelah Tigers rugby league team won the Aboriginal NSW Koori Knockout, defeating La Perouse in the grand final.

== Toomelah Country Women’s Association ==
The first Aboriginal branch of the Country Women's Association was established by a Queensland Country Women's Association (QCWA) member from the Goondiwindi district, Una Armstrong. The branch of the CWA was established in 1956, at Boggabilla Aboriginal Station, and was known as Toomelah Country Women's Association. This branch in NSW was supported by Queenslanders because their own by-laws prohibited Aboriginal women from joining their organisation in Queensland. Although it was established on the New South Wales side of the border, the Gwydir CWA reported that "the Queensland folk have taken it under their kindly wing and have promised to help in every way". Toomelah CWA remained a stand-alone initiative in New South Wales until 1959, when it was suggested by an Aboriginal Welfare Board inspector that a branch be formed in the Kempsey area at Green Hill.
