= Ivan Sen =

Australian filmmaker

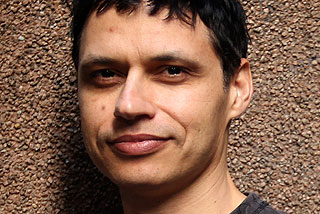
- Born: 1972 (age 53–54); Nambour, Queensland, Australia
- Occupation: Filmmaker
- Years active: 1995-present
- Website: ivansen.com.au

Ivan Sen (born 1972) is an Indigenous Australian filmmaker. He is a director, screenwriter and cinematographer, as well as an editor, composer, and sound designer. He is co-founder and director of Bunya Productions, and known for the 2013 film Mystery Road, its sequel Goldstone (2016), and the 2023 mystery-crime film Limbo.

== Early life ==
Ivan Sen was born in 1972 in Nambour, Queensland, the second child of Donella and Duro Sen. His mother Donella belongs to the Gamilaroi nation of northern New South Wales, and Duro was born in Croatia to a German father and Hungarian mother.

Before moving to Tamworth, New South Wales four years after Sen was born, in his mother's efforts to escape domestic violence, the family would regularly visit her birthplace, Toomelah. The Aboriginal community there was the last destination of three forced relocations of the Gamilaroi. Founded in 1937 by the New South Wales government, Toomelah turned from reserve into mission, but is also called a station, and has a history of precarious conditions and harming policies. Sen's mother herself was taken away at the age of fourteen to serve as cheap, forced labour at a remote farm.

For eight years Sen lived in Tamworth with his mother and two siblings, in an area colloquially known as Vegemite Village. The family still visited Toomelah occasionally, and Sen enjoyed popularity and friendship with all kinds of children, both black and white, rich and poor. However, wanting to overcome the difficult reality of the neighbourhood, his mother moved the family to Inverell. There, Sen was intimidated by the conservative, more racially and socially segregated dynamic of the town. Sen remained a solitary and silent teenager.

The change put Sen into contact with painting and photography. His mother married a newspaper editor, who gave him an old camera and lessons on photography and film-processing. Soon Sen was working for a newspaper and later enrolled in a photography diploma course at Griffith University, Brisbane. He moved on to film school at the same university and, one year later, to the Australian Film, Television and Radio School in Sydney. There he developed views which were contrary to the classical model of filmmaking taught at the school.

== Career ==
Sen went on to produce numerous short films throughout the late 1990s, including TV documentaries for SBS and the ABC.

During the 2000s he produced many documentaries, mostly for ABC Television. He worked with producer David Jowsey, who commissioned his first feature film, Beneath Clouds (released in 2002). This semi-autobiographical film was made with a mixed crew, including an Aboriginal director of photography, a white producer and several Indigenous secondary crew members. At the time, Sen and the white producer Teresa-Jane Hanson expressed their discontent with the limited availability of skilled Indigenous personnel. The film, produced on a $2.5 million budget, won him global acclaim, screening at the 2003 Sundance Film Festival and winning the Premiere First Movie Award at the 2002 Berlin Film Festival and the 2002 Best Director Award at the Australian Film Institute Awards.

In 2005, his SBS documentary Yellow Fella was screened in the section Un Certain Regard at the Cannes International Film Festival.

In 2009, the Message Sticks Indigenous Film Festival held at the Sydney Opera House saw the world premiere of Sen's Fire Talker, a documentary biopic about political activist, Aboriginal footballer, and statesman Charlie Perkins.

In the same year, Sen and David Jowsey set up Bunya Productions, in order to produce their own films. They used the TV revenue from their earlier works to finance the production of his second feature-length film, Dreamland, which screened at the 2010 Busan International Film Festival and Melbourne International Film Festival.

His third feature Toomelah (2011), received a prolonged standing ovation from the audience as it screened in Un Certain Regard at the Cannes Film Festival. The actors were welcomed with celebrity status and Peter Robb described Daniel Connors, the leading 9-year-old non-professional actor as "[handling] the international media like a pro."

Sen's fourth feature-length film Mystery Road premiered at the Sydney Film Festival in June 2013 and features many well-known Australian actors, including Aaron Pedersen, Hugo Weaving, and Jack Thompson. The film was shown at the 2013 Toronto International Film Festival.

His fifth feature, Goldstone, a sequel to Mystery Road, opened the Sydney Film Festival in June 2016 and opened in cinemas on 7 July 2016. It features actors Aaron Pedersen, Jacki Weaver, Alex Russell, David Gulpilil, David Wenham and Tom E. Lewis.

In 2018, Sen acted as executive producer on the ABC TV production of Mystery Road, a six-part series based on characters featured in the movie of the same name and sequel.

== Themes ==
Commentators often point to landscape, land and place as one of the most crucial groups of motif in Ivan Sen's films. His distinctive portrayal of skies, roads and low horizons are Sen's way of addressing issues of location, dislocation and relocation in their relation to identity. According to Jane Mills, "as a descendant of the Gamilaroi people of northern New South Wales who were historically dislocated from their own land and forcibly relocated, Sen's films are undoubtedly intercultural, diasporic, and postcolonial and, as such, qualify as accented and intercultural cinema".

The documentary Yellow Fella focuses on the Aboriginal actor and musician Tom E. Lewis, who starred in The Chant of Jimmie Blacksmith (Fred Schepisi, 1978). The character's "life was hauntedly close to [Lewis's] own: a young man of mixed heritage, struggling to find his place on the edge of two cultures". Sen documents Lewis as he hits the road to search for his Welsh father's place of burial and, at the same time, a missing part of his own identity.

Toomelah (2011), tells the story of Daniel, a 9-year-old Aboriginal boy living in the community where Sen's mother was born and grew up in. A hybrid of documentary and fiction follows Daniel as he roams around the "mish" trying to make sense of expectations of his family, his friends, and his own. Much of the script was based on notes Sen took of the inhabitants' own words, expressions, ideas and emotions, trying to translate the immobility from which Toomelah suffers—a place that has both lost touch with its roots and been forgotten by its founding state.

== Recognition ==
In recognition to his contribution to the town of Winton in Central West Queensland where Mystery Road and Goldstone were filmed, Sen was honoured with a star on Winton's Walk of Fame during The Vision Splendid Outback Film Festival in 2016.

== Filmography ==
=== Feature drama ===
- 2023 - Limbo
- 2022 – Expired
- 2016 – Goldstone – Bunya Productions, Dark Matter
- 2013 – Mystery Road – Bunya Productions, Mystery Road Films, Screen Australia
- 2011 – Toomelah – Bunya Productions, Sydney.
- 2010 – Dreamland
- 2002 – Beneath Clouds

=== Short drama ===
Short drama films include:

- 1999 – Dust – SBS Independent, NSW FTO.
- 1998 – Wind – AFC, SBS Independent, ABC TV, NSW FTO.
- 1997 – Journey – ABC, Festival of the Dreaming.
- 1996 – Tears – AFC, SBS Independent, NSW FTO.
- 1995 – Warm Strangers – AFTRS, ABC

=== TV documentaries ===
TV documentaries include:

- 2011 – Shifting Shelter 4 – ABC
- 2009 – Fire Talker, The life and times of Charles Perkins – ABC.
  A film about Aboriginal activist and statesman Charlie Perkins.
- 2008 – Embassy Days – ABC
- 2007 – A Sister's Love – ABC– a 55-minute documentary traces the disappearance of Lois Roberts, sister of arts director Rhoda Roberts, the family's uncertainty on her whereabouts, the finding of her body, and details about the inquiry and police action. The murder is still unsolved.
- 2007 – Men's Gathering – ABC
- 2006 – The Dreamers – ABC
- 2006 – Broken Borders – ABC
- 2006 – Aunty Connie – ABC
- 2006 – Shifting Shelter 3 – ABC
- 2005 – Yellow Fella – SBS
- 2005 – Who was Evelyn Orcher? – ABC
- 2000 – Shifting Shelter 2 – ABC
- 1998 – Vanish – ABC
- 1997 – Shifting Shelter 1 – ABC

== Awards ==
Year	Award	Category	Film	Result
1998	Cork International Film Festival	Best International Short Film	Tears	Won
1999	Australian Film Institute	Best Short Fiction Film	Wind	Nominated
2000	Clermont-Ferrand International Short Film Festival	International Competition	Wind	Won
2002	Australian Film Institute	Best Direction	Beneath Clouds	Won
2002	Australian Film Institute	Best Music	Beneath Clouds	Nominated
2002	Australian Film Institute	Best Screenplay	Beneath Clouds	Nominated
2002	Berlin International Film Festival	First Movie Award	Beneath Clouds	Won
2002	Berlin International Film Festival	Golden Berlin Bear	Beneath Clouds	Nominated
2002	Film Critics Circle of Australia Awards	Best Director	Beneath Clouds	Nominated
2002	Film Critics Circle of Australia Awards	Best Music	Beneath Clouds	Nominated
2002	IF Awards	Best Direction	Beneath Clouds	Won
2005	Cannes Film Festival	Un Certain Regard	Yellow Fella	Nominated
2011	Asia Pacific Screen Awards	UNESCO Award	Toomelah	Won
2011	Cannes Film Festival	Un Certain Regard	Toomelah	Nominated
2011	Cinemanila International Film Festival	International Competition	Toomelah	Nominated
2012	AACTA Awards	Byron Kennedy Award		Won
2014	AACTA Awards	Best Direction	Mystery Road	Nominated
2014	AACTA Awards	Best Original Screenplay	Mystery Road	Nominated
2014	AACTA Awards	Best Editing	Mystery Road	Nominated
2014	Australian Film Critics Association Awards	Best Director	Mystery Road	Won
2014	Australian Film Critics Association Awards	Best Screenplay	Mystery Road	Won
2014	Australian Film Critics Association Awards	Best Cinematography	Mystery Road	Won
2014	Film Critics Circle of Australia Awards	Best Director	Mystery Road	Won
2014	Film Critics Circle of Australia Awards	Best Script	Mystery Road	Nominated
2014	Film Critics Circle of Australia Awards	Best Cinematographer	Mystery Road	Nominated
2014	Film Critics Circle of Australia Awards	Best Editing	Mystery Road	Nominated
2014	Film Critics Circle of Australia Awards	Best Music	Mystery Road	Nominated
2016	AACTA Awards	Best Direction	Goldstone	Nominated
2016	AACTA Awards	Best Original Screenplay	Goldstone	Nominated
2016	AACTA Awards	Best Editing	Goldstone	Nominated
2016	Australian Film Critics Association Awards	Best Director	Goldstone	Won
2016	Australian Film Critics Association Awards	Best Screenplay	Goldstone	Nominated
2016	Australian Film Critics Association Awards	Best Cinematography	Goldstone	Nominated
2016	BFI London Film Festival	Best Film	Goldstone	Nominated
2016	Film Critics Circle of Australia Awards	Best Director	Goldstone	Won
2016	Film Critics Circle of Australia Awards	Best Script/Screenplay	Goldstone	Won
2016	Film Critics Circle of Australia Awards	Best Music	Goldstone	Won
2016	Film Critics Circle of Australia Awards	Best Cinematography	Goldstone	Nominated
2016	Film Critics Circle of Australia Awards	Best Editor	Goldstone	Nominated
2016	Sydney Film Festival	Best Film	Goldstone	Nominated
2016	Toronto International Film Festival	Platform Prize	Goldstone	Nominated
