= Cultural Diversity Award (UNESCO) =

The Cultural Diversity Award Under the Patronage of UNESCO, known simply as the Cultural Diversity Award, is an award category of the annual Asia Pacific Screen Awards. It is awarded annually to a film practitioner and film from the region for their exceptional contribution for upholding and promoting cultural diversity through the medium of the film.

The winners of the Cultural Diversity Award include:

Year	Film	Director	Nationality of Director
2007	The Band's Visit (Bikur Ha-Tizmoret)	Eran Kolirin	Israel
2008	Tinar	Mahdi Moniri	Iran
2009	Agrarian Utopia	Uruphong Raksasad	Thailand
2010	Bal (Honey)	Semih Kaplanoğlu	Turkey
2011	Toomelah	Ivan Sen	Australia
2012	Warriors of the Rainbow : Seediq Bale	Wei Te-sheng	Taiwan
2013	Hoze Haghashi (The Painting Pool)	Maziar Miri	Iran
2014	For Bîranînên Li Ser Kevirî (Memories on Stone)	Shawkat Amin Korki	Iraq
2015	Ya Tayr El Tayer (The Idol)	Hany Abu-Assad	Israel
2016	Hussein Hassan For Reşeba (The Dark Wind)	Hussein Hassan	Iraq
2017	Dede	Mariam Khatchvani	Georgia
2018	Memories of My Body	Garin Nugroho	Indonesia
2019	Rona, Azim's Mother	Jamshid Mahmoudi	Afghanistan
2021	Children of the Sun (Gaadi)	Prasanna Vithanage	Sri Lanka
2022	Muru	Tearepa Kahi	New Zealand
