= Mystery Road (film) =

2013 film

- Theatrical film poster
- Directed by: Ivan Sen
- Written by: Ivan Sen
- Produced by: David Jowsey
- Starring: Aaron Pedersen; Hugo Weaving; Jack Thompson; Ryan Kwanten; Tasma Walton
- Cinematography: Ivan Sen
- Edited by: Ivan Sen
- Music by: Ivan Sen
- Release dates: 5 June 2013 (Sydney FF); 15 August 2013 (Australia)
- Running time: 121 minutes
- Country: Australia
- Language: English
- Box office: $280,702

Mystery Road is a 2013 Australian crime film with neo-Western elements and setting, known as "outback noir". featuring Aaron Pedersen as the brooding Aboriginal Australian detective Jay Swan, the film was written and directed by Ivan Sen. A film sequel entitled Goldstone was released in 2016, and TV series in 2018, all centred on Jay Swan.

== Plot ==
Near the rural town of Winton, Queensland, a truck driver finds the body of a teenage Aboriginal girl named Julie Mason inside one of the drainage culverts under the road. Newly promoted Aboriginal Detective Jay Swan, recently returned from training in the city, investigates the murder. He learns that Julie used to exchange sex with truck drivers for money. He attempts to question another local Aboriginal girl, Tarni Williams, who was friends with Julie, but she refuses to speak to him. A boy gives Jay Julie's phone, which has several text messages to Jay's teenage daughter, Crystal. He visits his ex-wife, Mary, and speaks to Crystal. Jay searches a farm near where Julie's body was found and meets its owner, Sam Bailey. Jay later finds out that another teenage Aboriginal girl had also gone missing earlier.

One morning Jay goes to the radio tower where truck drivers would take girls, and Jay observes men taking something off a truck and driving it to what appears to be a drug lab. As he drives away, his police colleagues, Johnno and Constable Roberts, flag him down. Johnno attempts to intimidate Jay. Jay later asks his boss about Johnno and is told that Johnno had some unspecified trouble in his previous assignment and had to transfer here, but that he is close to making some big arrests.

Jay visits the motel where Julie used to go to have sex with truckers. The motel owner tells him about a white man registered under the name "William Smith", who drives a white hunting truck who had registered there. Jay returns to Sam's farm, where he encounters Pete, who says his father isn't around, insults Jay, refuses to let him search his truck, and states that he works as a kangaroo hunter and is an expert shot. Jay goes back to the police station and pulls up Pete Bailey's police record, which shows a long criminal record, and that Pete had last been arrested for drug possession by another local police officer who had recently been killed on the job, but the file of the police investigation of the death of the slain police officer is missing. Jay visits the young widow of the deceased police officer, who tells him that the officer had been called to work by another, unnamed police officer on the night that he was killed.

Jay follows Johnno leaving the police station in a police car. Johnno switches vehicles and leaves in his own hunting truck, driving to a rest stop, where he meets a local drug dealer named Wayne Silverman. Jay later goes to Wayne's house and arrests him. Wayne tells Jay that he deals drugs to local Aboriginal girls and then prostitutes them out when they can't pay. He says that he had stolen a car that contained heroin, but subsequently lost the drugs. Johnno interrupts the interrogation to release Wayne, who is his informant. Jay then discovers a further murder victim, Tarni. He then finds that Mary's house has been broken into and Crystal's whereabouts are unknown.

Jay stakes out the drug lab and sees a man in an orange car hand over Wayne to someone in a Land Rover. Johnno and Jay go to a restaurant, where Johnno ignores his questions, but states that he is looking for something that's missing, implying that its discovery will keep Crystal safe. Jay searches the house of the initial victim, Julie, finding several bags of heroin hidden in the TV. He calls Johnno to arrange their return at a hill off Mystery Road.

When he arrives first for the drop-off, Jay loads his hunting rifle and pistol. The orange car and Land Rover arrive and Jay hands over the heroin. Jay sees Pete's truck in the distance, and Pete uses his hunting rifle to wound Jay in the arm. A shootout ensues as Jay runs back to his car for cover. The man who is wearing a mask is shot by Johnno, using a hunting rifle from a distance and, as the driver attempts to leave, Jay kills him. Jay and Johnno shoot several of the men dead. Pete and Johnno exchange long-distance shots as Jay kills all the rest of the criminals when they attempt to flee and then, using his father's rifle, disables Pete's truck when he tries to drive away. Jay kills Pete, then spots the dead body of Johnno and unmasks the orange car passenger to discover it is Constable Roberts. Jay finds Sam Bailey shot through the neck in the Land Rover, sees scratch marks on the backseat and finds a necklace with the name "Julie" on it.

Jay returns to Winton and sees Mary and Crystal waiting for him. He gets out of the car and the three stare at each other as the sun sets.

== Cast ==
- Aaron Pedersen as Detective Jay Swan
- Hugo Weaving as Johnno
- Ryan Kwanten as Pete Bailey
- Jack Thompson as Charlie Murray
- Tony Barry as Sarge
- Robert Mammone as Constable Roberts
- Tasma Walton as Mary Swan
- Damian Walshe-Howling as Wayne Silverman
- David Field as Sam Bailey
- Bruce Spence as Jim, the local coroner
- Jack Charles as Jay's uncle, "Old Boy"
- Tricia Whitton as Crystal Swan, Jay's teenage daughter
- Siobhan Binge as Tarni Williams
- Danny Roberts as Macca
- Samara Weaving as Peggy Rogers
- Zoe Carides as Shirley, Motel Owner
- Roy Billing as Robbo, Weapon Shop Owner
- Lillian Crombie as Mrs. MacDonald

== Production ==
Mystery Road is a crime film with neo-Western elements and setting, known as "outback noir".

Ivan Sen directed the film as well as writing the screenplay, editing, and being responsible for the cinematography and score. It was produced by David Jowsey through Mystery Road Films.

The film was funded by Screen Queensland, supported by Screen Australia. Filming took place in rural Queensland round the town of Winton.

== Release ==
Mystery Road premiered at the Sydney Film Festival on 5 June 2013, and was released in Australian cinemas on 15 August 2013.

It had its international premiere in the Special Presentation section at the 2013 Toronto International Film Festival. and also screened at the 19th Busan International Film Festival, BFI London Film Festival, and Melbourne International Film Festival in 2013. The film was also rare foreign screening at the 2014 Pyongyang International Film Festival in North Korea.

Arclight Films was the international sales agent, while Well Go USA Entertainment was US distributor.

== Reception ==
=== Critical response ===
Mystery Road received positive reviews from critics. On the review aggregator website Rotten Tomatoes, the film has a score of 92% based on reviews from 36 critics, with an average rating of 7.3/10. The website's consensus reads, "Mystery Road evokes classic Westerns while using its Australian outback setting to delve into a surprisingly layered -- and powerfully impactful -- array of social issues."

Tom Clift of FILMINK called it a "masterfully executed slice of storytelling that rates as one of our finest films of the past few years." Sandra Hall of The Sydney Morning Herald also gave a positive review, commenting that "Mystery Road's links to the classic Hollywood western are as obvious as its hero's cowboy boots and white hat but they do nothing to diminish its Australianness". Craig Mathieson of The Sunday Age called it a "deeply satisfying and slow-burning modern-day western set in outback New South Wales(sic), Ivan Sen's outstanding film Mystery Road bridges the current divide in Australian cinema with a prominent and precise work." A later review, published in Groote Broadcasting in 2025, opined: "Mystery Road is more than a crime story—it's a cultural reckoning wrapped in a genre film, executed with sophistication and emotional weight. Sen's vision, paired with Pedersen's commanding presence, makes this a masterpiece of contemporary Indigenous cinema and a defining moment for Australian film". Not all reviews were positive. Alex Doenau of Trespass commented "There simply isn't enough dynamism to justify Sen's story. Australian movies have to work harder to secure audiences beyond those who go to them out of a sense of duty or worthiness; Mystery Road simply doesn't go that far".

Several critics and academics have examined the film as an example of outback noir. Film critic Eddie Cockrell compared it to Roman Polanski's 1974 drama Chinatown, writing "both are sun-drenched films noirs, both feature commanding protagonists who spend much of the film doing wrong things for the right reasons, and both feature climactic showdowns in places laden with metaphor". Greg Dolgopolov of UNSW regards both Mystery Road and Goldstone as classics of the genre, with "similar examination of the injustices of the past, the buried ancestral trauma and the divisions between black and white Australia as issues of the ambivalence of figures of authority". Parvathy Das, a research scholar at the National Institute of Technology Calicut in Kerala, India, wrote an essay titled "Land in Outback Noir Films: Trope of Spatial Alienation of Aboriginal People in Ivan Sen's Mystery Road (2013) and Goldstone (2016)", writing "Both films have numerous extensive, bird's eye view shots of the outback which familiarise the viewer with the landscape. It is not captured to enhance the cinematic effect nor as a locale alone. The landscape reflects the colonial past and spatial alienation of Aboriginal people in different walks of their life. The trope of ownership and dispossession plays out at different levels in the films".

=== Accolades ===
Award	Category	Subject	Result
AACTA Awards (3rd)	Best Film	David Jowsey	Nominated
AACTA Awards (3rd)	Best Direction	Ivan Sen	Nominated
AACTA Awards (3rd)	Best Original Screenplay	Ivan Sen	Nominated
AACTA Awards (3rd)	Best Actress	Tasma Walton	Nominated
AACTA Awards (3rd)	Best Editing	Ivan Sen	Nominated
AACTA Awards (3rd)	Best Sound	Lawrence Horne	Nominated
AACTA Awards (3rd)	Best Sound	Nick Emond	Nominated
AACTA Awards (3rd)	Best Sound	Joe Huang	Nominated
AACTA Awards (3rd)	Best Sound	Phil Judd	Nominated
AACTA Awards (3rd)	Best Sound	Les Fiddess	Nominated
AACTA Awards (3rd)	Best Sound	Greg Fitzgerald	Nominated
Asia Pacific Screen Awards	Best Actor	Aaron Pedersen	Nominated
Australian Film Critics Association Awards	Best Film	David Jowsey	Won
Australian Film Critics Association Awards	Best Director	Ivan Sen	Won
Australian Film Critics Association Awards	Best Actor	Aaron Pedersen	Won
Australian Film Critics Association Awards	Best Supporting Actor	Hugo Weaving	Won
Australian Film Critics Association Awards	Best Supporting Actress	Tasma Walton	Nominated
Australian Film Critics Association Awards	Best Screenplay	Ivan Sen	Won
Australian Film Critics Association Awards	Best Cinematography	Ivan Sen	Won
Film Critics Circle of Australia Awards	Best Film	David Jowsey	Won
Film Critics Circle of Australia Awards	Best Director	Ivan Sen	Won
Film Critics Circle of Australia Awards	Best Script	Ivan Sen	Nominated
Film Critics Circle of Australia Awards	Best Actor	Aaron Pedersen	Won
Film Critics Circle of Australia Awards	Best Actress	Tasma Walton	Nominated
Film Critics Circle of Australia Awards	Best Supporting Actor	Tony Barry	Nominated
Film Critics Circle of Australia Awards	Best Supporting Actor	Hugo Weaving	Nominated
Film Critics Circle of Australia Awards	Best Cinematographer	Ivan Sen	Nominated
Film Critics Circle of Australia Awards	Best Editing	Ivan Sen	Nominated
Film Critics Circle of Australia Awards	Best Music	Ivan Sen	Nominated
Film Critics Circle of Australia Awards	Best Production Design	Matthew Putland	Nominated

== Sequel and spin-off series ==
Sen wrote and directed a sequel to Mystery Road, entitled Goldstone. Pedersen reprises his role, and joining the cast is David Wenham, Alex Russell, David Gulpilil and Jacki Weaver.

A spin-off six-part TV series also titled Mystery Road screened on the ABC in 2018, with Series 2 shown in 2020. An origin story, based on the background of Jay Swan, was presented in two series titled Mystery Road: Origin, with Mark Coles Smith as Swan, premiering in 2022.
