= David Gulpilil =

Aboriginal Australian actor and dancer (1953–2021)

David Gulpilil AM
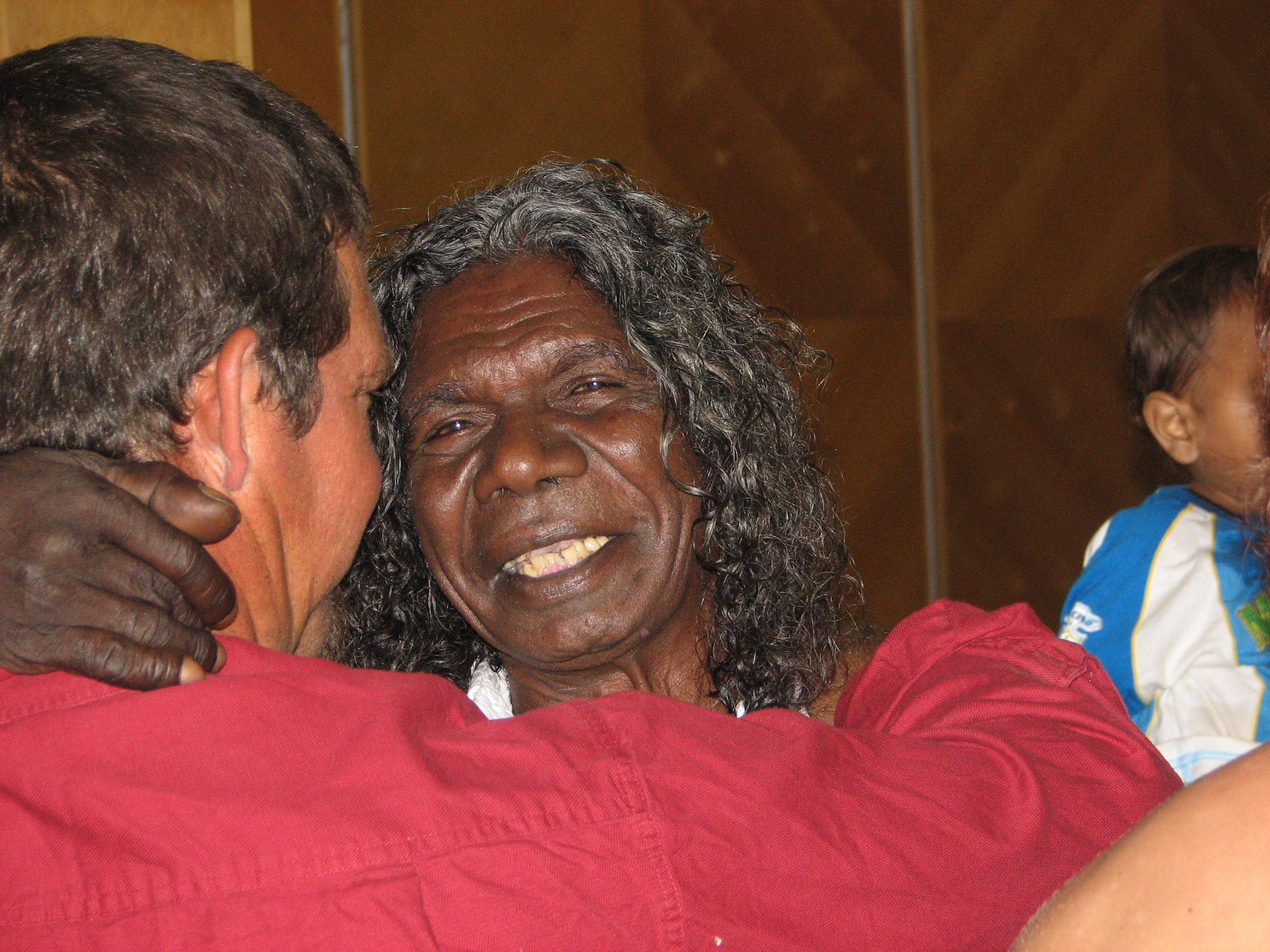
- Gulpilil in 2006
- Born: Gulpilil Ridjimiraril Dalaithngu; 1 July 1953; Arnhem Land, Northern Territory, Australia
- Died: 29 November 2021 (aged 68); Murray Bridge, South Australia
- Years active: 1971–2019
- Spouses: Robyn Djunginy; Airlie Thomas; Miriam Ashley
- Children: 7
- Awards: Best Actor in a Leading Role; 2002 The Tracker

David Dhalatnghu Gulpilil AM (1 July 1953 – 29 November 2021) was an Aboriginal Australian actor and dancer. He was known for his roles in the films Walkabout (1971), Storm Boy (1976), The Last Wave (1977), Crocodile Dundee (1986), Rabbit-Proof Fence (2002), The Tracker (2002) and Australia (2008).

He was raised in a traditional lifestyle in Arnhem Land. A skilled dancer, he was noticed by British filmmaker Nicolas Roeg, who cast him in his first feature film role in Walkabout (1971). He also made several appearances on stage.

Recognised as one of Australia's greatest actors and a trailblazer for Indigenous Australians in film, he was honoured with numerous awards and honours, including a lifetime achievement award at the 2019 NAIDOC Awards. After his death, for a short period, he was posthumously referred to as David Dalaithngu, at his family's request, to conform to Indigenous practices that avoid naming the dead.

== Early life and education ==
Gulpilil was likely born in 1953. In a 2021 documentary, he said that he did not know how old he was, referring to, like all people, not remembering his birth and, of ourselves, not knowing how old we are, and also, through the circumstances of his later life and health, having lost track of time. Local missionaries recorded his birth as 1 July 1953, based on "guesswork". He belonged to the Yolngu people and was initiated into the Mandhalpuyngu tribal group, hailing from his traditional homeland of Marwuyu in Arnhem Land, Northern Territory, Australia.

As a young boy, Gulpilil was an accomplished hunter, tracker and ceremonial dancer. Gulpilil spent his childhood remote from non-Aboriginal Australian influences. He did not see a European-Australian man until he was 8 years old. He received a traditional upbringing in the care of his family, until the death of his parents. He then attended the school at Maningrida in North East Arnhem Land, where he was assigned the English name "David". When he came of age, Gulpilil was initiated into the Mandhalpuyngu tribal group. His skin group totemic animal was the kingfisher (the meaning of the name Gulpilil) and his homeland was Marwuyu.

He spoke several Aboriginal languages. and became fluent in English after appearing in his first film Walkabout (1971).

== Career ==
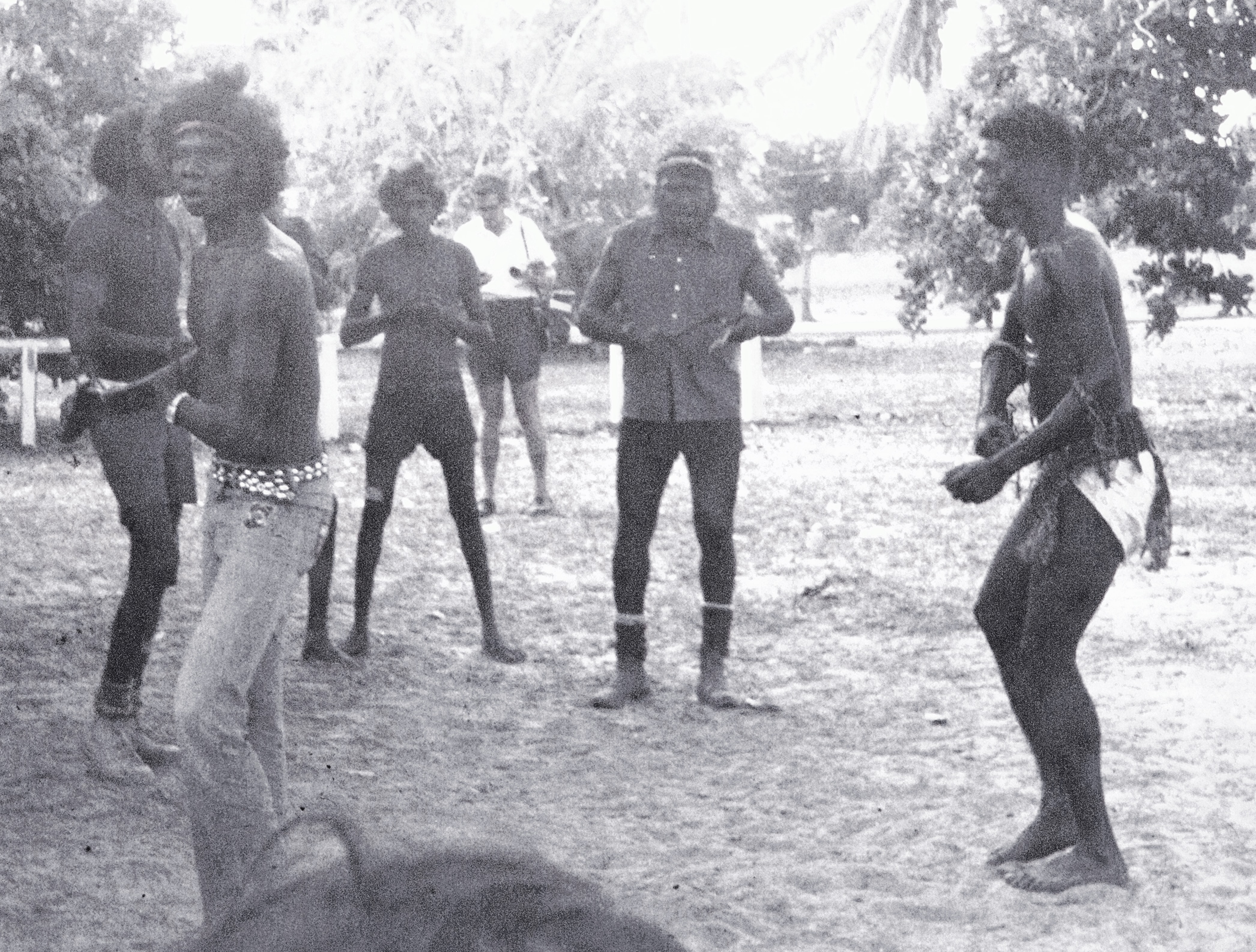
Gulpilil at dancing practice in Lajamanu, July 1972

=== Film and television ===
In 1969, Gulpilil's skill as a tribal dancer caught the attention of British filmmaker Nicolas Roeg, who had come to Maningrida scouting locations for a forthcoming film. Roeg promptly cast the 16-year-old unknown to play a principal role in his film Walkabout, released in 1971. It was internationally acclaimed and Gulpilil's role was the first time that a male Aboriginal character had been portrayed as sexually attractive. Gulpilil's on-screen charisma, combined with his acting and dancing skills, was such that he became an instant national and international celebrity.

The young man travelled internationally, mingled with prominent people and was presented to heads of state. During these travels to promote the film, he met and was impressed with John Lennon, Bob Marley, Bruce Lee, Marlon Brando and Jimi Hendrix. (Note: Also related by Gulpilil in the film My Name Is Gulpilil.) He taught Bob Marley how to play the didgeridoo, while Marley introduced him to "ganja".

Gulpilil appeared in many more films and television productions. He played a lead role in the commercially successful and critically acclaimed Storm Boy (1976). He "dominated" the film The Last Wave (1977) with his charismatic performance as Chris Lee, a conflicted urban tribal Aboriginal. He also played Neville Bill in Crocodile Dundee (1986).

A documentary about his life, Gulpilil: One Red Blood, was aired on ABC Television in 2003. The title comes from a quote by Gulpilil: "We are all one blood. No matter where we are from, we are all one blood, the same".

Gulpilil was a major creative influence throughout his life in both dance and film. He initiated and narrated the film Ten Canoes, which won a Special Jury Prize at the 2006 Cannes Festival. The low-budget film, based on a 1,000-year-old traditional story of misplaced love and revenge, features non-professional Aboriginal actors speaking their local language. Gulpilil collaborated with the director, Rolf de Heer, urging him to make the film. He ultimately withdrew from a central role in the project for "complex reasons." Gulpilil also provided the voice of the storyteller for the film. De Heer had directed Gulpilil in the earlier film, The Tracker (2002).

In 2007, he starred in Richard Friar's hour-long independent documentary, Think About It! This was focused on Indigenous rights and the anti-war movement. It included commentary from former Prime Minister Malcolm Fraser, former Greens leader Bob Brown, and David Hicks, then a detainee at the United States' Guantanamo Bay detention camp on Cuba.

In 2014, Gulpilil again collaborated with De Heer, this time sharing on screenwriting credits for Charlie's Country. The film won several awards, including Best Actor in Un Certain Regard at the Cannes Film Festival.

In 2015, Gulpilil appeared in the documentary Another Country, directed by Molly Reynolds. In this film, Gulpilil narrates the story of his life, from when he was a child living on country; the arrival of the first white men ("ghosts"), in the form of missionaries; through The Intervention and the introduction of the BasicsCard. He often made serious criticisms hidden beneath his trademark humour.

Gulpilil worked again with Reynolds when she directed a documentary about his life, My Name Is Gulpilil, which premiered at the 2021 Adelaide Festival.

Gulpilil was renowned for portraying Aboriginal culture before it became threatened by the white civilisations. He became somewhat divorced from his own culture by his career in film. He felt that he was stretched somewhere between the two, with "one tiptoe in caviar and champagne, this one in the dirt of my Dreamtime."

After his death, his family collaborated with Savage Films and Brindle Films to document the challenges faced to return David Gulpilil to his Homeland in the Arafura Swamp, to lay him to rest at the place of his birth. Directed by Maggie Miles and Trisha Morton-Thomas the documentary is titled Journey Home, David Gulpilil and has narration by Hugh Jackman and cultural storytelling by Yolngu rapper Baker Boy. The film won Best Documentary at the 15th AACTA Awards.

=== Stage ===
In March 2004, he performed in the autobiographical stage production, Gulpilil at the Adelaide Festival of Arts and received standing ovations. This work, co-written with Reg Cribb and directed by Neil Armfield, was based on stories of his life assembled into a script. These included tales from the making of Walkabout, performing at Buckingham Palace and inadvertently causing a bomb scare at Cannes. The show was later staged in Brisbane and Sydney.

He also performed on stage in The Cradle of Hercules at the Sydney Opera House in 1974; the Commonwealth Gala Performance in Brisbane in 1982 (in front of Queen Elizabeth II and the Duke of Edinburgh, Prince Philip;) and the Message Sticks Film Festival in Sydney in 2002.

=== Dance ===
Perhaps the most renowned traditional dancer in Australia, Gulpilil organised troupes of dancers and musicians and performed at festivals throughout the country. He won the prestigious Darwin Australia Day Eisteddfod dance competition four times.

In 1979, Gulpilil and another dancer, Dick Plummer, were accompanied by master didgeridu player David Blanasi and his musical partner, songman Djoli Laiwanga, on a tour to Europe, stopping at Hawaii en route. There, they performed at an Australia Day function on the lawn of the Australian Consular Residence in Honolulu on 29 January 1979. Part of their performance was filmed by CSIRO scientist Gavin Gillman which is in the collection of the National Film and Sound Archive of Australia.

In November 1997, Gulipilil's dance troupe performed at the second National Aboriginal Dance Conference in Adelaide (hosted by the National Aboriginal Dance Council Australia (NADCA).) The conference included discussions of cultural and intellectual property rights and copyright issues for Australian Indigenous dancers. A free concert was given in Rymill Park / Murlawirrapurka. The troupe was given a A$9,000 grant from the Northern Territory Government to attend the third conference in Sydney in 1999.

=== Writing and painting ===
In addition to his career in dance, music, film and television, Gulpilil was an acclaimed storyteller. He wrote the text for two volumes of children's stories based on Yolngu beliefs. These books also feature photographs and drawings by Australian artists and convey Gulpilil's reverence for the landscape, people and traditional culture of his homeland.

King brown snake with blue tongue lizard at Gulparil waterhole, painted by Gulpilil in 2013–14, is in the Art Gallery of South Australia's collection.

== Recognition and awards ==
Gulpilil was appointed a Member of the Order of Australia (AM) in 1987, and the Centenary Medal in 2001.

He twice received the AACTA/AFI Award for Best Actor in a Leading Role, for The Tracker in 2002 and Charlie's Country in 2014. He was also nominated for this award in 1977 for Storm Boy. Gulpilil was nominated for the AFI Award for Best Actor in a Supporting Role for Rabbit-Proof Fence in 2002. In 2003, he was awarded the inaugural Don Dunstan Award at the Adelaide Film Festival.

He was nominated for the Helpmann Award for Best Male Actor in a Play in 2004 for the stage production Gulpilil. A portrait of Gulpilil by Craig Ruddy won the 2004 Archibald Prize, Australia's best-known art prize.

In 2013 Gulpilil was the recipient of the Red Ochre Award, which is awarded annually by the Australia Council for the Arts to an outstanding Indigenous Australian (Aboriginal Australian or Torres Strait Islander) artist for lifetime achievement.

In May 2014, Gulpilil won a Best Actor award at the Cannes Film Festival for his performance in Rolf de Heer's film Charlie's Country. The award was in the Un Certain Regard section, a part of the festival that emphasises original, individual points of view and innovative film-making.

In 2019, Gulpilil was honoured with the lifetime achievement award at the 2019 NAIDOC Awards, and the Premier's Award for Lifetime Achievement in the South Australian Ruby Awards.

In June 2021, Ngarrindjeri-Arrernte artist Thomas Readett created a huge permanent mural on the eastern wall of the Tandanya National Aboriginal Cultural Institute in Adelaide. Featuring hand-painted black-and-white images representing Gulpilil's early career and later life, the mural was commissioned by ABCG Film, in partnership with Tandanya, Arts South Australia, Department of the Premier and Cabinet and Screen Australia.

During the Vision Splendid Outback Film Festival at Winton, Queensland in June 2021, Gulpilil was honoured with a star on Winton's Walk of Fame.

In August 2021, Tandanya mounted an exhibition entitled Djungi Gulpilil (Gulpilil family), featuring the work of many artists in his family, including his twin sister, one of his wives and his brother, as well as his own paintings. The exhibition was expressly created to honour and celebrate his life and to bring him comfort as he is being treated a long way from home, yearning for "culture, language and kin".

At the 11th AACTA Awards, to be held on 8 December 2021, Gulpilil was officially awarded the Longford Lyell Award for his contribution to the Australian film industry; he had informally received the award at his home a month earlier. His face was projected onto the Sydney Opera House in the evening of the award ceremony.

== Later life and death ==
Gulpilil was diagnosed with terminal lung cancer in 2017, and retired from acting in 2019. His illness prevented him from attending the 2019 NAIDOC Awards, where he was recognised with the lifetime achievement award.

Gulpilil died at his home in Murray Bridge, South Australia, on 29 November 2021. Following his death, his family requested that he be referred to as David Dalaithngu for a period of time to avoid naming the dead and many news articles about his death refrained from using the actor's professional name, while warning that the articles contained his name and image.

Tributes were published in Australia by political leaders, including Minister for Indigenous Australians Ken Wyatt, federal opposition leader Anthony Albanese and South Australian premier Steven Marshall; actors, including Hugh Jackman; film critics; and community elders and relatives, including Witiyana Marika. Overseas news outlets also published lengthy tributes and obituaries.

On 2 December 2021, a statement was posted by Tandanya on Facebook on behalf of the Yolngu community and Gulpilil's kin:

David was an inimitable talent who ‘walked between two worlds’, that of his Country and Culture, and that of the film world, placing him in a unique position regarding posthumous naming cultural practice.

David wanted people to know his name, remember his work and know his immense legacy to Australian cinema and Australian culture. He was rightfully proud. He wanted his storytelling through film to be shared, to be on the record for the generations to come.

As were his wishes, the Community now give permission for all of his names to be used. He may be referred to as:

- David Gulpilil
- David Gulpilil Ridjimiraril Dalaithngu
- David Gulpilil AM
- David Gulpilil Ridjimiraril Dalaithngu AM

The permission remains to use his image in films and photographs.

The announcement was also reported in newspapers.

== Personal life and family ==
Gulpilil suffered from alcoholism and, in later life, consequential cognitive issues, having been introduced to alcohol during filming of Walkabout. In later life, this led to several clashes with the law. In 2006, Gulpilil was charged with carrying an offensive weapon after an altercation at the house of a friend in Darwin, when Gulpilil had allegedly armed himself with a machete after he and his wife had been asked to leave the home by the homeowners, who had allegedly armed themselves with a totem pole and a garden hoe. However, he was found not guilty after the judge accepted that the machete was used for cultural purposes, including carving didgeridoos and had not been intended for use as a weapon.

On 30 March 2007, a Darwin magistrate imposed a 12-month domestic violence order on Gulpilil over an incident which had involved his wife, Miriam Ashley, on 28 December 2006; Gulpilil was ordered to stay away from her while drinking. In December 2010, Gulpilil was charged with aggravated assault against Ashley, with the court hearing that he had thrown a broom at her, fracturing her arm. In September 2011, he was found guilty and sentenced to twelve months in Berrimah Prison in Darwin. After this stint in prison, he finally got sober.

Gulpilil's other wives or partners included Airlie Thomas and Robyn Djunginy. Two of his daughters are Phoebe Marson and Makia McLaughlin. Seven children survived him: Jida (a musician and actor), Milan, Makia, Andrew, Jamie, Phoebe and Malakai. Witiyana Marika, Yolngu elder, musician and band member of Yothu Yindi, is his son by lore.

Several members of his family are artists, including his yapa (twin sister) Mary Dhalapany, a leading weaver; his brother Peter Minygululu, known for his story-telling and detailed artworks; and former wife Robyn Djunginy, who was known for her bottle paintings. His waku (nephew), Bobby Bununggurr, is a singer, dancer, law man and reconciliation advocate. During the 1970s and 1980s, the two men travelled widely together, performing, dancing and singing.

== Filmography ==
=== Film ===
| Year | Film | Role | Notes | Ref. |
|---|---|---|---|---|
| 1964 | In Song and Dance | | documentary | |
| 1971 | Walkabout | Black boy | credited as David Gumpilil | |
| 1973 | No Bag Limit | | documentary | |
| 1974 | The Morning Star Painter | | documentary | |
| 1975 | The Rainbow Serpent | | short film | |
| 1976 | Mad Dog Morgan | Billy | | |
| 1976 | Storm Boy | Fingerbone Bill | Nominated—AACTA Award for Best Actor | |
| 1976 | To Shoot a Mad Dog | | documentary | |
| 1976 | Felix | | short film | |
| 1977 | The Last Wave | Chris Lee | credited as Gulpilil | |
| 1978 | The Magic Arts | | short film | |
| 1978 | Little Boy Lost | | | |
| 1978 | Three Dances by Gulpilil | | documentary | |
| 1980 | The Painter: Wunuwun in Sydney | | documentary | |
| 1980 | Billy West | | short film | |
| 1981 | Great Barrier Reef | | documentary | |
| 1983 | The Right Stuff | Aborigine | | |
| 1984 | The Hunting Party | | documentary | |
| 1985 | Rainbow Serpent: A Changing Culture | | documentary | |
| 1986 | Crocodile Dundee | Neville Bell | | |
| 1987 | Dark Age | Adjaral | | |
| 1991 | Until the End of the World | David | | |
| 1996 | Dead Heart | Second Man in Desert | | |
| 2001 | Serenades | Rainman | | |
| 2002 | The Tracker | The Tracker | AACTA Award for Best Actor; FCCA Award for Best Actor; Inside Film Award for Best Actor | |
| 2002 | Rabbit-Proof Fence | Moodoo | Nominated—AACTA Award for Best Supporting Actor | |
| 2002 | Gulpilil: One Red Blood | Himself | documentary | |
| 2002 | Mimi | | short film | |
| 2002 | Following the Rabbit-Proof Fence | | documentary | |
| 2005 | The Proposition | Jacko | | |
| 2006 | Ten Canoes | The Storyteller | | |
| 2006 | Crocodile Dreaming | Burrimmilla | short film | |
| 2008 | Australia | King George | | |
| 2013 | Satellite Boy | Jagamarra | | |
| 2014 | Charlie's Country | Charlie | AACTA Award for Best Actor; AFCA Award for Best Actor; AFCA Award for Best Screenplay; Cannes Film Festival Un Certain Regard for Best Actor; Nominated—AACTA Award for Best Original Screenplay (with Rolf de Heer); Nominated—Asia Pacific Screen Award for Best Actor; Nominated—FCCA Award for Best Actor; Nominated—FCCA Award for Best Screenplay | |
| 2016 | Goldstone | Jimmy | | |
| 2016 | Crazy Days at the Old Brumby Moon | Old Mick | | |
| 2017 | Cargo | Daku | | |
| 2018 | Storm Boy | Father of Fingerbone Bill | | |
| 2021 | My Name is Gulpilil | Himself | | |

=== Television ===
| Year | Title | Role | | Notes |
|---|---|---|---|---|
| 1972 | Boney | Black Boy / Balinga / Dancer / Tonto / David Ooldea | 5 episodes | |
| 1973 | Spinifex Breed | | episode: "Pilot" | |
| 1974 | Homicide | Gary Willis | episode: "Slow Fuse" | |
| 1976 | Rush | Satchel | episode: "The Kadaitcha Man" | |
| 1976 | Luke's Kingdom | Aborigine Boy | episode: "The Dam and the Damned" | |
| 1976 | Taggart's Treasure | | telemovie | |
| 1977 | The Outsiders | Billy Potter | episode: "Sophie's Mob" | |
| 1979 | Skyways | Koiranah | episode: "Koiranah" | |
| 1979 | The Dreamtime | Narrator | | |
| 1979 | This is Your Life | Himself | 1 episode | |
| 1980 | The Timeless Land | Bennelong | | |
| 1980 | Young Ramsay | Aborigine | episode: "Dreamtime" | |
| 1989 | Naked Under Capricorn | Activity | | |
| 1995 | The Man from Snowy River | Manulpuy | episode: "The Savage Land" | |
| 2000 | BeastMaster | Shaman | episode: "Valhalla" | |
| 2000 | Der Paradiesvogel (The Bird of Paradise) | | | |
| 2017 | The Leftovers | Christopher Sunday | 2 episodes | |

== Books ==
- Gulpilil (1979). Gulpilil's stories of the dreamtime. Compiled by Hugh Rule and Stuart Goodman; illustrated by Allan Hondow; photography by Stuart Goodman. Sydney: Collins. ISBN 978-0-00-184383-7.
- Gulpilil (1983). The Birirrk, our ancestors of the dreaming. Photographs by Neil McLeod. Cheltenham, Australia: L & S Publishing. ISBN 978-0-86898-061-4.

== See also ==
- List of Australian film actors
