= Toomelah (film) =

- Theatrical film poster
- Directed by: Ivan Sen
- Written by: Ivan Sen
- Produced by: David Jowsey
- Starring: Daniel Connors; Christopher Edwards; Michael Connors
- Cinematography: Ivan Sen
- Edited by: Ivan Sen
- Music by: Ivan Sen
- Production company: Bunya Productions
- Distributed by: Visit Films
- Release date: 11 May 2011 (Cannes)
- Running time: 106 minutes
- Country: Australia
- Language: English

Toomelah is a 2011 Australian drama film written and directed by Ivan Sen and starring Daniel Connors, Christopher Edwards, and Michael Connors. It was shown at the 2011 Cannes Film Festival on 11 May in the Un Certain Regard program, where it received a two-minute long standing ovation. The film's story takes place in Toomelah Station, New South Wales.

== Plot ==
Daniel is a ten-year-old boy living in Toomelah, NSW. After being suspended from school for threatening to stab a classmate with a pencil and finding there is little to do in his town, he decides he wants to be a part of the gang controlling the drug trade in his township, so he decides to help Linden, a well-known local drug dealer. Bruce, one of Linden's rivals, is released from prison and a turf war erupts. Meanwhile, Daniel faces problems at school and in his family, such as his mother's addictions, the estrangement of his alcoholic father and the return of his aunt who was forcibly removed from the mission as a child during the Stolen Generations.

== Cast ==
- Daniel Connors as Daniel
- Christopher Edwards as Linden
- Michael Connors as Buster
- Dorothy Cubby
- Dean Daley-Jones as Bruce
- Alex Haines as Scammer
- Linden Binge as Jarome
- Aunty Sharon Binge
- Aunty Margery Binge
- Uncle Lloyd Hippi
- Tyericq Jiko
- Danieka Connors as Tanitia
- Lauren McGrady
- Kevin Binge

== Production ==
When asked why he made a film about Toomelah, director Ivan Sen said:

I’ve always wanted to make a film out there because some of my earliest memories come from there. I’ve never lived there, but I used to go there all the time… But my mother grew up there and all her family come from there so there’s always been a connection there. As a result, I’ve always wanted to go back there and do something, make this film, a drama. It took a long time work out a method in which to do it, but the story came from a very intense observation period where I went out there for a few weeks and just followed a few teenage boys around and followed the little boy around who played Daniel and wrote down everything I saw, even the dialogue I heard. All of that all came together in the screenplay.

— Ivan Sen, The Reel Bits.

Before filming, Sen obtained permission to film in Toomelah from the town's elders. Sen shot most of the scenes himself, as many of the actors in the movie are his personal friends and he believed their acting would be restricted if an entire conventional crew did the filming.

== Awards ==
Ceremony	Category	Recipient	Result
2011 Asia Pacific Screen Awards	Best Performance by an Actor	Daniel Connors	Nominated
2011 Asia Pacific Screen Awards	UNESCO Screen Award	Toomelah	Won
2011 Pacific Meridian Film Festival	Grand Prix	Toomelah	Won
