= Aaron Pedersen =

Australian actor (born 1970)

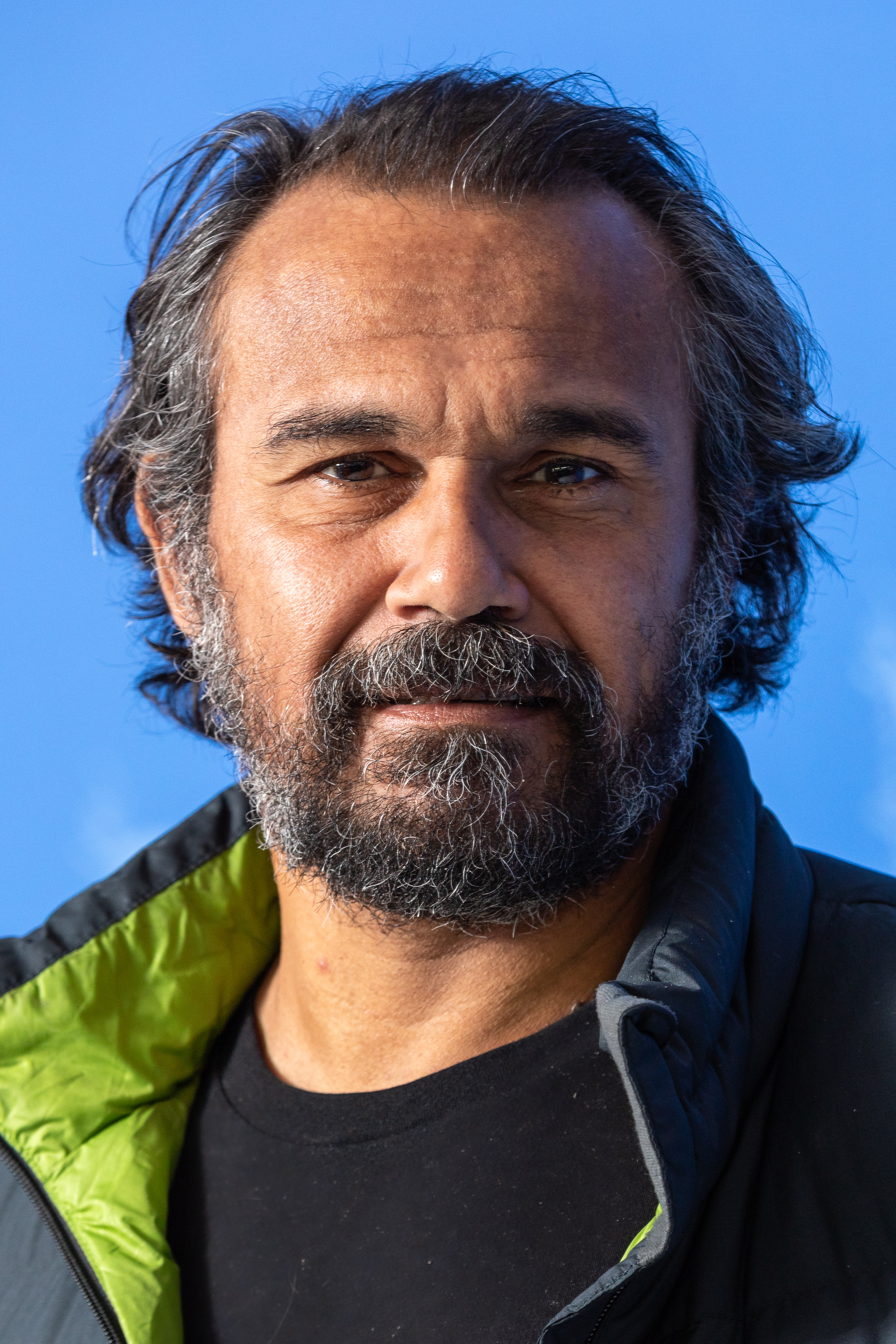
- Pedersen at the 2020 Berlinale
- Born: Northern Territory, Australia
- Occupation: Actor
- Years active: 1993–present

Aaron Pedersen is an Aboriginal Australian television and film actor. He is known for many film and television roles, in particular as Detective Jay Swan in the film Mystery Road (2013), its sequel Goldstone (2016), and spin-off television series (2018–2020). He has been nominated for many and won several acting awards, including the 2021 AACTA Award for International Award for Best Actor in a Series.

== Early life and education ==
Aaron Pedersen, who is of Arrernte and Arabana descent, was born on an Ansett flight to Alice Springs, his home town. He and his seven siblings grew up in foster homes away from their alcoholic mother, Margaret, and experienced much family violence in the home. From an early age, he looked after his brother, Vinnie, who has cerebral palsy and a mild intellectual disability.

In the early 1990s, Pedersen underwent a cadetship at the ABC in Melbourne, and worked as a journalist and presenter. He was a host for the TV series Blackout.

== Career ==
His acting career began in 1994, when he starred in the miniseries Heartland and was voted Bachelor of the Year by Cleo magazine. He came to notice in 1995 as co-host of Gladiators Australia, an Australian game show.

Pedersen's first major acting role was as lawyer Vince Cellini in Wildside in 1997. In 1999, he played Detective Senior Constable Michael Reilly in Water Rats, and took a major role in The Secret Life of Us (2005).

Since 2007, he had the leading role in SBS's drama series The Circuit, and from 2007 to 2011 he appeared in Channel Seven's drama City Homicide. He appeared as Cam Delray in ABC Television's Jack Irish series, beginning in 2012 and running for several seasons.

Pedersen took the lead role of Detective Jay Swan in Ivan Sen's Mystery Road (2013), a role he reprised in its sequel film Goldstone (2016), and its spin-off television series (2018–2020).

He played war veteran Frank Gibbs in A Place to Call Home (2017–2018) and Tom Campbell in Total Control (2019). In 2020 to 2021, he was the presenter for an ABC Television documentary series Australia Remastered. In the same year, he featured as a presenter with writer Holly Ringland in an eight-episode documentary series on ABC Television called Back to Nature.

In 2024, Pedersen would appear in the Foxtel/Binge series High Country. On 13 January 2026, Pedersen was announced as a returning cast member of the second series.

== Recognition ==
In 2007, Pedersen was the recipient of the Bob Maza Fellowship, which recognises emerging acting talent and support professional development for Indigenous actors.

=== Awards ===
Pedersen has been nominated for many and won several awards.

He won the Best Actor award at the Melbourne Underground Film Festival for Darklovestory (2006).

The documentary film My Brother Vinnie (2006) won the Best Short Documentary award at the Melbourne International Film Festival and was nominated for an IF Award for Best Short Documentary. Pedersen was also nominated for a Deadly Award for Outstanding Achievement in Film.

Pedersen won a Deadly Award nomination for Male Actor of the Year in 2003 and 2011, and was nominated for it in 2007.

In 2013, he was nominated for Best Performance by an Actor in the Asia Pacific Screen Awards, for his role in the film Mystery Road.

After being nominated several times over the years for AFI and AACTA Awards, in 2021 he won the AACTA International Award for Best Actor in a Series, for his role in Mystery Road.

== Other roles ==
Pedersen speaks at schools and prisons, and is concerned at the rate of incarceration of Indigenous Australians, seeing parallels with the early history of Australia, being founded as a penal colony; the link between poverty and crime. Other speaking roles include emceeing various events, including the Melbourne Indigenous Arts Festival, and has hosted Black Nite Film Festival since 2009. He was co-host of the 2011 Deadly Awards, and has undertaken many other public speaking engagements.

== Personal life ==
Pedersen has looked out for his younger brother Vinnie, who has cerebral palsy and mild intellectual disabilities, on and off since he was a child. In 1997, when Aaron was pursuing his career as an actor in Sydney, their grandmother, who had been helping to care for Vinnie in Alice Springs, died. There were no services available nor other family support, so Aaron took on the role as full-time carer and Vinnie joined him in Sydney. After things got difficult for Aaron, his de facto mother-in-law, Mum Frances, stepped in and Vinnie moved in with her.

Vinnie accompanies Aaron during his filming. The short documentary film My Brother Vinnie (2006), written by Pedersen, directed by Steven McGregor, and shot by Warwick Thornton (both friends), was selected for the Melbourne International Film Festival and Message Sticks Indigenous Film Festival.

Pedersen's partner was Sarah Bond. They split up in 2017. While he is not currently seeing anyone, he says that caring for Vinnie means that there is no space in his life for children. He loves working with wood, and has a "secret desire to be a tradie".

== Filmography ==
=== Film ===
Year	Title	Role	Notes
1996	Dead Heart	Tony	
2000	Saturday Night	Mac	
2004	Queen of Hearts		
2004	Floodhouse	Uncredited	
2006	Darklovestory	Gil	
2006	My Brother Vinnie	Himself	Short film
2012	Bad Karma	Bear	
2013	Mystery Road	Detective Jay Swan	
2013	The Darkside		
2014	The Fear of Darkness	Dr. Nicholas Trengrove	
2015	Spear	Suicide Man	
2016	Killing Ground	German	
2016	Goldstone	Detective Jay Swan	Sequel to Mystery Road
2017	1% (aka Outlaws)	Sugar	
2019	Dirt Music	Beaver	
2020	High Ground	Walter	
2021	Back to the Outback	Clive the Dung Beetle (voice)	
2026	Apex	Park Ranger	

=== Television ===
Year	Title	Role	Notes
1993–1996	Crocadoo	Billy	TV series
1994	Heartland	Clarrie Carmichael	6 episodes
1996	The Territorians	Tom Daly	Television film
1997–1999	Wildside	Vince Cellini	50 episodes
1999–2001	Water Rats	Det. Snr. Constable Michael Reilly	88 episodes
2002–2003	MDA	Dr. Tony McKinnon	23 episodes
2003	Grass Roots	Joe Ventimiglia	Episodes: "Investigation" and "Garbage"
2005	The Secret Life of Us	Corey Mailins	9 episodes
2005	Grange	Sam	Television film
2005	A Very Barry Christmas	Warrun (voice only)	Television film
2006	Blackjack: Dead Memory	Greg	Television film
2006–2011	City Homicide	Duncan Freeman	85 episodes
2007	East West 101	Adam King	Episode: "Death at the Station"
2007–2010	The Circuit	Drew Ellis	12 episodes Logie nominee in 2009 for the 'Most Outstanding Actor' award
2008	Double Trouble	Kelton	13 episodes
2012	Jack Irish: Black Tide	Cam Delray	Television film
2012	Jack Irish: Bad Debts	Cam Delray	Television film
2014	Jack Irish: Dead Point	Cam Delray	Television film
2014	The Code	Tim Simons	6 episodes
2016	It's a Date	Matt	Episode: "Should You Re-connect with an Old Flame?"
2016–2021	Jack Irish	Cam Delray	16 episodes
2017	A Place to Call Home	Frank Gibbs	12 episodes
2017	Blue Murder: Killer Cop	Detective Joe Kenshell	Miniseries, 2 episodes
2018–2020	Mystery Road	Jay Swan	12 episodes Sequel to Mystery Road (2013) and Goldstone
2019	Total Control	Tom Campbell Jnr	4 episodes
2020	The Gloaming	Inspector Lewis Grimshaw	8 episodes
2023	Barfuß Durch Australien	Kalti Rogers	Television film
2024-present	High Country	Owen Cooper	14 episodes
2026	Return to Paradise	Laurie Rogers	1 episode (1.4 Buried Past)

=== Other appearances ===
Year	Title	Role	Notes
2020–present	Australia Remastered	Host	4 episodes
2021	Back to Nature	Host	
1995	Australian Gladiators	Host	Series 1
