= Goldstone (film) =

2016 film directed by Ivan Sen

- Theatrical release poster
- Directed by: Ivan Sen
- Written by: Ivan Sen
- Produced by: David Jowsey; Greer Simpkin
- Starring: Aaron Pedersen; Alex Russell; Cheng Pei-pei; David Wenham; David Gulpilil; Michelle Lim Davidson; Tom E. Lewis; Jacki Weaver
- Cinematography: Ivan Sen
- Edited by: Ivan Sen
- Music by: Ivan Sen
- Production company: Bunya Productions
- Distributed by: Transmission Films Lightyear Entertainment
- Release dates: 8 June 2016 (Sydney Film Festival); 7 July 2016 (Australia)
- Running time: 110 minutes
- Country: Australia
- Language: English
- Budget: $2 million
- Box office: $650,352

Goldstone is a 2016 Australian crime thriller film in the "outback noir" category, directed by Ivan Sen. It is a sequel to Mystery Road (2013) and reprises the role of Aaron Pedersen as detective Jay Swan, with a new cast including Alex Russell, Jacki Weaver, David Wenham, and David Gulpilil. It was released in Australia on 7 July 2016.

== Plot ==
Three years after exposing the corruption in his hometown of Winton, Queensland, the Indigenous detective Jay Swan is sent to the small mining town of Goldstone to find a missing Asian tourist. He is pulled over for driving under the influence by a young local cop, Josh, who informs the town's corrupt mayor, Maureen.

Jay is asleep in a motel caravan when it's shot up by two men, one with an eye patch. When Josh arrives, Jay tells him of his case.

Josh tells him the motel management is furious and wants Jay to leave. Josh takes him to a remote off-grid shelter.

Josh goes to the local mine, Furnace Creek, to meet with the mine's supervisor, Johnny, who attempts to bribe him to help Furnace Creek expand their operations. Johnny then meets with Maureen, who is trying to help him get approval from the local Aboriginal land council by bribing the land council's head, Tommy, to allow the use of the land.

Jay meets with a local Aboriginal elder, Jimmy, in his search for the missing Asian tourist. Jimmy leads him to Furnace Creek.

Jay sneaks past Furnace Creek's security checkpoint and observes several young Asian women disembarking from a plane and climbing into a van. The women are being forced into prostitution to pay off their debts. As Jay returns to his car, he is detained overnight by Furnace Creek security, and the next morning, Johnny attempts to intimidate him.

Upon returning home, Jay is visited by Josh, who tells him Maureen has summoned Jay to meet her for tea. Jay complies, and Maureen subtly warns him to stop his investigation.

Johnny and Maureen hold a press conference where they announce the mine's expansion and make an ostentatious show of having council approval. However, Jimmy walks out, denying them his signature of approval.

Jay receives an anonymous call and collects one of the girls' passports from the caller, then notices Josh's car. He follows Josh to the local creek, where Jimmy's body is hanging from a tree. Jay suspects foul play, but Josh states that Tommy witnessed the suicide.

Josh goes to the local bar/brothel, where the Asian girls are being kept by the madam, Mrs. Lao. He befriends a prostitute called Mei and tells her to contact him if she needs help.

Tommy visits Josh, and confesses to killing Jimmy; he tells Josh about the corrupt activities of Maureen, Johnny, and the thugs who work as hitmen for Furnace Creek. Jay consults the man who found the passport and explores the area where it was found. There he finds a skeleton he assumes are the remains of the woman he was assigned to find.

Josh receives a missed call message from Mei. When he arrives at the brothel all the girls have gone. Interrogating the bartender, Josh is told they are in a trailer in the desert.

Josh first visits Maureen, who is anxiously shredding paperwork, and demands that she put him in touch with the head of the criminal operations. She reluctantly agrees to make the call.

Josh arrives at the trailer, seeking the women, but finds it empty. The thugs arrive, ambush Josh, and force him to dig his own grave. Jay, who has surreptitiously followed Josh, shoots at the thugs from a sniper's perch, incapacitating some and forcing them all to flee. Jay then enlists Josh to track down the thugs and rescue the women.

Jay and Josh drive at the Furnace Creek site and, after an intense shootout with the thugs, discover the women's whereabouts. Jay sees Johnny's plane fleeing the mines and chases it, while Josh finds and rescues the women.

Jay arrives at the airfield but is intercepted by a black armed guard, whose gunshots cause Jay's vehicle to crash while Johnny escapes. Jay and the guard stand off but decide to spare one another.

Later, at Jay's remote shelter, Josh tells Jay the federal authorities have taken over the case, retrieved the women, and begun an investigation into the corruption. Additionally, Maureen has skipped town.

Josh says he has requested a transfer to somewhere near the ocean where he can "shake off the dust" (corruption) of the outback. Jay bids him goodbye and drives away from Goldstone, into the desert, and retraces his visit with Jimmy to their ancestral site.

== Cast ==
- Aaron Pedersen as Jay Swan
- Alex Russell as Josh Waters
- Jacki Weaver as Maureen the Mayor
- Cheng Pei-pei as Mrs Lao
- David Gulpilil as Jimmy
- Michelle Lim Davidson as Mei
- David Wenham as Johnny
- Michael Dorman as Patch
- Kate Beahan as Pinky
- Ursula Yovich as Maria
- Max Cullen as Old Timer
- Tom E. Lewis as Tommy
- Cameron Ambridge as Security Guard

== Production ==
Goldstone is a sequel to the 2013 outback noir film Mystery Road, in the same genre and featuring the same detective. Like its predecessor, Goldstone was written and directed by Ivan Sen, who was also responsible for cinematography. Sen says he "used the outback thriller genre to explore deeper themes".

The film was largely shot on location in the small town of Middleton in Queensland, around two hours west of Winton, where Mystery Road was shot.

It was produced by David Jowsey and Greer Simpkin, through Bunya Productions, in association with Screen Queensland and Screen Australia.

Sen has talked about the character of Jay Swan as more complex than "just a cop navigating through a web of crime and corruption... Jay's just one of those characters that exists in this country – [an] Indigenous [person] that walks in two worlds…they've got to appease two different cultures, two different colours". "He's a guy from an Indigenous background who's defending and upholding white law, which has been in conflict with the white establishment for such a long time. He's very divisive, no matter where he goes. He's loaded with all kinds of political, social connotations. The situations you could put him in and have something quite deep and meaningful come out [of] his experiences are endless". He adds that Swan's character has developed significantly, and continues to develop, during the course of the second film.

Themes of racism, human trafficking, and corruption are explored in the film.

== Release ==
The film had its world premiere at the Sydney Film Festival on 8 June 2016, and its international premiere at the Toronto International Film Festival in September 2016.

It was released in Australian cinemas on 7 July 2016. Transmission Films was responsible for distribution in Australia and New Zealand, while Arclight Films handled international sales.

The film was re-released on 2 March 2018. Its release for Blu-ray and DVD sales took place on 11 September 2018.

== Reception ==
=== Box office ===
Goldstone grossed $87,639 in the United States and Canada and $562,713 in other territories for a worldwide total of $650,352, plus $11,987 with home video sales, against a production budget of $2 million.

=== Critical response ===
On review aggregator Rotten Tomatoes, the film has an approval rating of 76% based on 37 reviews, with an average rating of 7.07/10. The website's critical consensus reads, "Goldstone weaves socially conscious themes through its procedural thriller plot outline, with visually thrilling, solidly crafted results." Metacritic, which uses a weighted average, assigned a score of 78 out of 100, based on 10 critics, indicating "generally favorable reviews".

Luke Buckmaster, writing in The Guardian, gave the film 5 out of 5 stars, calling it "a masterpiece of outback noir that packs a political punch". Jane Albert, writing on Broadsheet, called Goldstone "a visually stunning, deeply arresting film", and Pedersen's performance "so realistic it's almost too painful to watch – so convincing is he as this damaged, lost man who drinks to forget yet is driven by the need to see justice done".

Several critics and academics have examined the film, along with its predecessor Mystery Road, as examples of outback noir and examinations of the effect of colonialism on Aboriginal people. Greg Dolgopolov of UNSW regards both Mystery Road and Goldstone as classics of the genre, with "similar examination of the injustices of the past, the buried ancestral trauma and the divisions between black and white Australia as issues of the ambivalence of figures of authority". Parvathy Das, a research scholar at the National Institute of Technology Calicut in Kerala, India, wrote an essay titled "Land in Outback Noir Films: Trope of Spatial Alienation of Aboriginal People in Ivan Sen's Mystery Road (2013) and Goldstone (2016)", writing "Both films have numerous extensive, bird's eye view shots of the outback which familiarise the viewer with the landscape. It is not captured to enhance the cinematic effect nor as a locale alone. The landscape reflects the colonial past and spatial alienation of Aboriginal people in different walks of their life. The trope of ownership and dispossession plays out at different levels in the films".

=== Accolades ===
Award	Category	Subject	Result	Ref.
AACTA Awards (6th)	Best Film	David Jowsey & Greer Simpkin	Nominated	
AACTA Awards (6th)	Best Direction	Ivan Sen	Nominated	
AACTA Awards (6th)	Best Original Screenplay	Ivan Sen	Nominated	
AACTA Awards (6th)	Best Editing	Ivan Sen	Nominated	
AACTA Awards (6th)	Best Production Design	Matt Putland	Nominated	
AFCA Awards	Best Film	David Jowsey	Nominated	
AFCA Awards	Best Film	Greer Simpkin	Nominated	
AFCA Awards	Best Director	Ivan Sen	Won	
AFCA Awards	Best Screenplay	Ivan Sen	Nominated	
AFCA Awards	Best Cinematography	Ivan Sen	Won	
AFCA Awards	Best Actor	Aaron Pedersen	Won	
AFCA Awards	Best Supporting Actor	David Gulpilil	Nominated	
AFCA Awards	Best Supporting Actress	Jacki Weaver	Won	
ASSG Award	Best Film Sound Recording	Mike Bakaloff	Won	
ASSG Award	Best Film Sound Recording	Nick Emond	Won	
BFI London Film Festival	Official Competition for Best Film	Ivan Sen	Nominated	
FCCA Awards	Best Film	David Jowsey	Won	
FCCA Awards	Best Film	Greer Simpkin	Won	
FCCA Awards	Best Actor	Aaron Pedersen	Won	
FCCA Awards	Best Director	Ivan Sen	Won	
FCCA Awards	Best Script/Screenplay	Ivan Sen	Won	
FCCA Awards	Best Editor	Ivan Sen	Nominated	
FCCA Awards	Best Cinematography	Ivan Sen	Nominated	
FCCA Awards	Best Music	Ivan Sen	Won	
FCCA Awards	Best Actress - Supporting Role	Jacki Weaver	Nominated	
Sydney Film Festival	Sydney Film Prize for Best Film	Ivan Sen	Nominated	
Toronto International Film Festival	Platform Prize	Ivan Sen	Nominated	
