= List of Australian submissions for the Academy Award for Best International Feature Film =

Best International Feature Film submissions from Australia

Highlights
- Debut: 1996
- Submissions: 18
- Nominations: 1
- Oscar winners: none

Australia has submitted films for the Academy Award for Best International Feature Film (Note: The category was previously named the Academy Award for Best Foreign Language Film, but this was changed to the Academy Award for Best International Feature Film in April 2019, after the Academy deemed the word "Foreign" to be outdated.) since 1996. The award is handed out annually by the United States Academy of Motion Picture Arts and Sciences to a feature-length motion picture produced outside the United States that contains primarily non-English dialogue.

As of 2026, Australia has been nominated once, for Tanna (2016).

== Submissions ==
The Academy of Motion Picture Arts and Sciences has invited the film industries of various countries to submit their best film for the Academy Award for Best International Feature Film since 1956. The Best International Feature Film Committee oversees the process and reviews all the submitted films. Following this, they vote via secret ballot to determine the five nominees for the award.

The Australian submission is selected by a committee of Australian industry professionals convened and selected by Screen Australia. As a majority-English-speaking country, Australia infrequently sends non-English language productions to the category.

Samson & Delilah (2009), advanced to the December shortlists, but was not nominated. It follows a teenaged Aboriginal couple on the run, and was considered an early favorite after win the Caméra d'Or at Cannes.

Tanna (2016), directed by Bentley Dean and Martin Butler, was the country first nomination. The film dramatizes the true story of members of the Indigenous Kastom tribe in Vanuatu.

Below is a list of the films that have been submitted by Australia for review by the Academy for the award by year and the respective Academy Awards ceremony.

Year (Ceremony)	Film title used in nomination	Original title	Language(s)	Director	Result
1996 (69th)	Floating Life	浮生	Cantonese, English, German	Clara Law	Not nominated
2001 (74th)	La Spagnola		Spanish, English, Italian	Steve Jacobs	Not nominated
2006 (79th)	Ten Canoes		Yolngu Matha, Kunwinjku, English	Rolf de Heer	Not nominated
2007 (80th)	The Home Song Stories	意	Cantonese, English, Mandarin	Tony Ayres	Not nominated
2009 (82nd)	Samson and Delilah		Walpiri, English	Warwick Thornton	Made shortlist
2012 (85th)	Lore		German, English	Cate Shortland	Not nominated
2013 (86th)	The Rocket	ບັ້ງໄຟ	Lao	Kim Mordaunt	Not nominated
2014 (87th)	Charlie's Country		Yolngu Matha, English	Rolf de Heer	Not nominated
2015 (88th)	Arrows of the Thunder Dragon		Dzongkha	Greg Sneddon	Not nominated
2016 (89th)	Tanna		Southwest Tanna	Bentley Dean and Martin Butler	Nominated
2017 (90th)	The Space Between		Italian, English	Ruth Borgobello	Not nominated
2018 (91st)	Jirga	جرګه	Pashto, English	Benjamin Gilmour	Not nominated
2019 (92nd)	Buoyancy		Khmer, Thai, Isan	Rodd Rathjen	Not nominated
2021 (94th)	When Pomegranates Howl		Pashto, Persian	Granaz Moussavi	Not nominated
2022 (95th)	You Won't Be Alone	Нема да бидеш сама	Macedonian	Goran Stolevski	Not nominated
2023 (96th)	Shayda		Persian, English	Noora Niasari	Not nominated
2025 (98th)	The Wolves Always Come at Night		Mongolian	Gabriella Brady	Not nominated
2026 (99th)	First Light		Filipino	James J. Robinson	Pending

== See also ==
- List of Academy Award winners and nominees for Best International Feature Film
- List of Academy Award-winning foreign language films
- List of Australian Academy Award winners and nominees
- Cinema of Australia
