= Tania Nehme =

Australian film editor (born 1966)

- Born: September 1966 (age 59)
- Occupation: Film editor
- Years active: 1986–present

Tania Nehme (born September 1966) is an Australian film editor. She has edited a number of films directed by Rolf de Heer and won and been nominated for many awards for her editing work.

== Early life and education ==
Tania Nehme was born in September 1966 and is from South Australia.

She graduated from the Flinders Drama Centre at Flinders University in Adelaide in 1983, and in 1990 gained an AFTRS Certificate from the Australian Film Television and Radio School.

== Career ==
Nehme has worked as a film editor since 1986. She began her career by working on commercials, documentaries, and short drama films.

While studying at AFTRS in 1989, she edited a short film called Once In Time, directed by Isou Morimoto, which earned a nomination in the 1991 AFI Awards.

In 1995 she edited her first feature film, Rolf de Heer's Epsilon, and went on to several more of De Heer's films, including The Quiet Room (1996), Dance Me to My Song (1998),The Old Man Who Read Love Stories (2001; released 2004), The Tracker (2002) and Alexandra's Project (2003). After their collaboration on Ten Canoes (2006), she also edited a documentary about the making of the film, called The Balanda And The Bark Canoes. Both films won awards. In collaboration with de Heer, Molly Reynolds, and the Yolngu people of the Arafura Swamp, she worked on Twelve Canoes, a spin-off educational project made for television. Also for De Heer, along with directors Martin Butler and Bentley Dean, she edited the 2012 comedy drama The King is Dead.

She also edited Richard Flanagan's 1998 film adaptation of his novel, The Sound Of One Hand Clapping.

In 2007 Nehme edited a silent feature film Dr. Plonk.

In 2009, she edited the award-winning documentary feature Contact, directed by Martin Butler and Bentley Dean, which tells the story of 20 Martu people who in 1964 became the last people in the Great Sandy Desert to have come into contact with Europeans.

She edited Tanna (released 2015) which was Nominated for Best Foreign Film at the Academy Awards in 2017, and the 2016 documentary about Liz Jackson, A Sense of Self, which won a Walkley Award.

In 2022 she edited Matt Vesely's debut feature, the sci-fi thriller Monolith, for which her work drew praise from reviewers.

She edited Sally Aitken's 2024 documentary feature Every Little Thing, which had its world premiere at the Sundance Film Festival. She edited, along with Andrea Lang, Tracey Rigney's documentary feature about the Hindmarsh Island bridge controversy of the 1980s and 1990s, titled Kumarangk: Sacred Women's Business, which has its world premiere at the 2026 Adelaide Film Festival on 17 October 2026. Nehme had previously (2001) edited the SBS Australia short documentary film Kumarangk 5214 on the same topic, directed by Jessica Wallace and co-produced by Wallace and Rebecca Summerton.

Nehme has worked on TV series, including Barron Television children's series Chuck Finn (1999-2000), as well as a short feature funded by the Australian Film Commission called The 13th House. In 2013, she edited the four-episode documentary series First Footprints, directed by Martin Butler and Bentley Dean and narrated by Ernie Dingo, which premiered on 14 July 2013 on ABC Television. The series won the Walkley Documentary Award in 2013.

== Other activities ==
Nehme was on the jury at the 2018 Adelaide Film Festival, along with Madeleine Parry and Larissa Behrendt.

In 2020 she was a guest lecturer at a 5-day development workshop called the Aboriginal Short Film Initiative, run by filmmakers Beck Cole and Warwick Thornton at South Australian Film Corporation's Adelaide Studios.

== Recognition and awards ==
- 1991: Nominated, AFI Award for her work on the 1989 short drama film Once in a Time
- 2002: Nominated, Best Editor, AFI Awards, for The Tracker
- 2002: Nominated, Best Editing for Film, Film Critics Circle of Australia Awards, for The Tracker
- 2003: Nominated, Best Editing for Film, Film Critics Circle of Australia Awards, for Alexandra's Project
- 2003: Nominated, Best Editor, AFI Awards, for Alexandra's Project
- 2004: Winner, IF Award for Best Editing, for The Old Man Who Read Love Stories
- 2004: Nominated, Best Editor, AFI Award, for The Old Man Who Read Love Stories
- 2004: Nominated, Film Critics Circle of Australia Awards 2004, for The Old Man Who Read Love Stories
- 2006: Winner, AFI Award for Best Editing for Ten Canoes
- 2006: Winner, Best Editing, Film Critics Circle of Australia Awards for Ten Canoes
- 2006: Winner, Best Documentary at the Critics Circle Awards, shared with Rolf de Heer and Molly Reynolds, for The Balanda And The Bark Canoes
- 2017: Winner, Walkley Documentary Award in the Walkley Awards, for A Sense of Self; awarded to Liz Jackson, Martin Butler, Bentley Dean, and Tania Nehme
- 2021: Winner, AFTRS Award for Best Editing in a Short Drama at the Ellie Awards, Australian Screen Editors, for Ayaan
- 2021: Nominated, Dendy Award for Australian Short Film at the Sydney Film Festival, for Ayaan
- 2021: Winner, Best Editing in the AACTA Awards, for My Name Is Gulpilil.

== Selected filmography ==
Year	Film	Director	Notes
1989	Once in a Time	Isao Morimoto	Short drama film
1995	Epsilon	Rolf de Heer	
1996	The Quiet Room	Rolf de Heer	
1997	Almost Alien	Rolf de Heer	
1998	The Sound of One Hand Clapping	Richard Flanagan	
1998	Dance Me to My Song	Rolf de Heer	
2001	Heather Rose Goes to Cannes	Chris Corin	Documentary
2002	The Tracker	Rolf de Heer	Best Editor nominations at 2002 AFI Awards and Film Critics Circle Awards; also nominated as part of the sound team
2003	Alexandra's Project	Rolf de Heer	Best Editor nominations at the 2003 AFI and Film Critics Circle Awards; also nominated as part of the sound team
2003	The 13th House	Shane McNeil	
2004	The Old Man Who Read Love Stories	Rolf de Heer	Winner, Best Editor at the IF Awards; nominations for Best Editing at the Film Critic's Circle and AFI Awards
2006	Ten Canoes	Rolf de Heer	7th feature film with Rolf de Heer; AFI Award for Best Editing; Film Critics Circle of Australia Awards 2006, Best Editing
2007	Dr. Plonk	Rolf de Heer	Feature
2007	Done Dirt Cheap	Debbie Carmody	TV short
2008	Casualties of War	Jeni Lee	Documentary
2009	Jacob	Dena Curtis	Short Drama
2009	Twelve Canoes	Rolf de Heer	
2009	Contact	Martin Butler; Bentley Dean	Documentary
2011	Top Dog	Fiona Percival	
2012	The King is Dead	Rolf de Heer; Martin Butler; Bentley Dean	Comedy drama
2013	First Footprints	Rolf de Heer; Martin Butler; Bentley Dean	TV series
2013	Charlie's Country	Rolf de Heer	Feature film
2015	Another Country	Molly Reynolds	Feature documentary
2015	Still Our Country	Molly Reynolds	Feature documentary
2015	Tanna	Bentley Dean; Martin Butler	Nominated for Best Foreign Film, Academy Awards 2017
2016	A Sense of Self	Liz Jackson; Martin Butler; Bentley Dean; Tania Nehme	2017 Walkley Award for best documentary
2019/2020	Ayaan	Alies Sluiter	Short film, starring Babetida Sadjo, Trevor Jamieson, and Gary Sweet
2020	Yer Old Faither	Heather Croall	Feature documentary
2021	My Name is Gulpilil	Molly Reynolds	Documentary about Yolngu actor David Gulpilil
2021	Facing Monsters	Bentley Dean	Documentary; with Meredith Watson Jeffrey
2022	Monolith	Matt Vesely	Sci-fi thriller
