= Julie Ryan (Australian producer) =

Australian film producer

- Occupations: Film producer, film industry executive
- Years active: 1996–present
- Organization: Cyan Films
- Notable work: The Tracker (2002); Ten Canoes (2006); Red Dog (2011); H Is for Happiness (2019); Hotel Mumbai (2019)

Julie Ryan is an Australian film producer. Known for her early work with director Rolf de Heer on films such as The Sound of One Hand Clapping (film) (1996) through to Ten Canoes (2006), other well-known work includes Red Dog (2011), H Is for Happiness (2019), and Hotel Mumbai (2019). Her film production company, formed in 2007, is Cyan Films. She occupied an executive position with the South Australian Film Corporation from August 2020 until March 2023.

== Early life and education ==
Ryan studied film theory at university in Melbourne.

== Career ==
=== Work with Rolf de Heer ===
Ryan was 30 years old before she started working in the film industry, moving from Melbourne to Adelaide in 1996 to work as production secretary on Richard Flanagan's The Sound of One Hand Clapping (film). Flanagan had originally asked Rolf de Heer to direct the film, but De Heer declined, saying that he would act as producer on the film instead. It was during this time that she developed a working relationship with De Heer that continued for over a decade. She later said that he had taught her how films were made, "so it was a long film school for me".

She joined Vertigo Productions as production manager on De Heer's feature film Dance Me to My Song, which screened at the Cannes Film Festival in 1998. Ryan then produced the SBS documentary, Heather Rose Goes to Cannes, about the experience of the main character in the feature film, who was severely disabled by cerebral palsy. Ryan's first feature film as co-producer (with Michelle de Broca) was The Old Man Who Read Love Stories (2001), starring Richard Dreyfuss and Hugo Weaving, for which she spent three months in French Guiana in 1999. The film was nominated for Best Film in the AFI Awards, Film Critics Circle of Australia Awards, and IF Awards. She then co-produced The Tracker (2002), Alexandra's Project (2003), and Ten Canoes (2006) with De Heer, all of which were nominated for or won awards, and were highly acclaimed. Ryan also co-produced (with De Heer) the 52-minute documentary The Balanda and the Bark Canoes. Directed by Tania Nehme, Molly Reynolds, and De Heer, the film was about the making of Ten Canoes. It won the Urban Cinefile Audience Award for Documentaries at the Sydney Film Festival in 2006 and was screened on SBS. Her fifth feature film with de Heer was a black and white silent comedy called Dr Plonk (released in 2007).

=== Cyan Films ===
In 2007, Ryan partnered with new media producer Kate Croser to form a new production company based in Adelaide, Cyan Films. The company was co-located with the South Australian Film Corporation (SAFC). Cyan's first feature film was initially described as a co-production with Kurdish-Iranian filmmaker Bahman Ghobadi and first time writer/director Granaz Moussavi, called Auction. However Moussavi's first film was released as My Tehran for Sale, with no mention of Ghobadi, and had its world premiere at the Adelaide Film Festival in February 2009.

Red Dog (2011) was big hit in Australia, and Hotel Mumbai (2019) was the most successful Australian film to be released internationally in that year. Ryan had worked with Hotel Mumbai director Anthony Maras on another project, a short film called The Palace (released 2011), and was confident of his skills.

After Hotel Mumbai, Ryan produced H Is for Happiness, for director John Sheedy. The film is based on a young adult novel called My Life As an Alphabet, by Barry Jonsberg. The film screened at the 2019 Melbourne International Film Festival.

=== SAFC ===
In August 2020 Ryan was appointed to the position of Executive, Production at the SAFC. At this time, her previous partner at Cyan Films, Kate Croser, was CEO of SAFC.

On 1 March 2023, Ryan left her role with the SAFC.

=== Sanctuary Pictures partnership ===
She returned to work with her company Cyan Films, and to work in partnership with Umbrella Entertainment's new production arm, Sanctuary Pictures, which she would lead along with Umbrella general manager Ari Harrison. Within her first week with Sanctuary, she attended the Australian International Documentary Conference, to review current documentaries. Sanctuary Pictures would first focus on feature films, later planning to branch into premium TV series.

In May 2025, Sanctuary Pictures' first feature film, a horror-thriller called Penny Lane Is Dead directed by Mia'Kate Russell was marketed at Cannes. The film is supported by the SAFC and the Adelaide Film Festival Investment Fund, with post-production by KOJO Studios. It is scheduled to have its red carpet screening at the Adelaide Film Festival on 18 October 2025.

=== Other work and activities ===
In July 2019, Ryan gave a presentation about the importance of making short films to emerging filmmakers at the Screen Makers Conference, held at the Media Resource Centre in Adelaide.

In 2023 Ryan executive produced the horror film Late Night with the Devil, which was selected for screening at SXSW. The film went on to lead the number of nominations in the 2025 AACTA Awards, with nominations in 14 categories, including Best Film, and won Best Independent Film at the 52nd Saturn Awards.

== Recognition and awards ==
- 2006: Winner, Un Certain Regard Special Jury Prize, 2006 Cannes Film Festival
- 2020: Special Mention, at the 70th Berlin International Film Festival, for H Is for Happiness
- 2020?: Winner, CinefestOZ Film Prize, for H Is for Happiness
