= Paul Blackwell (actor) =

Australian stage and film actor (1954–2019)

- Born: 11 July 1954; Adelaide, South Australia, Australia
- Died: 24 February 2019 (aged 64); Adelaide
- Occupation: Actor

Paul Blackwell (11 July 1954 – 24 February 2019) was an Australian actor, mainly known for his stage work. He played a major role was in Rolf De Heer's 1996 film The Quiet Room and other film roles, and was also co-creator and director on a number of stage productions.

== Early life and education ==
Paul Blackwell was born on 11 July 1954 in Adelaide, South Australia. His mother, Imelda Bourke, was a well-known jazz singer in the 1950s and 1960s, performing at Adelaide city venues and making appearances on radio and television, but after marriage was mostly confined to the role of housewife. His father, Daryl played the piano in swing bands. For work, he Daryl ran the family business, FW Blackwell Funerals, inherited from his father Frank.

Paul had four younger siblings: Lisa, Madeleine, Mark, and Louise. Madeleine also became a stage actor, and later a filmmaker; her debut film, Damage, which stars their mother Imelda as one of the main characters, was screened in the 2020 Adelaide Film Festival and released in cinemas in November 2023. Lisa and Mark both became musicians, with Lisa teaching piano in Melbourne and Mark playing drums and working as a sound recordist in film and television. Louise is a singer and cabaret performer, who is also a Francophile.

The family lived in the middle-class eastern suburb of Wattle Park, and Paul attended Rostrevor College in Adelaide for his schooling.

In the 1970s, Blackwell and a friend lived and worked in London, working as roadies for artists such as Pink Floyd, Frank Sinatra, and The Manhattan Transfer. Returning to Australia, he went to Sydney to study acting at the National Institute of Dramatic Art from 1980 to 1982.

== Career ==
=== Stage ===
Blackwell appeared in many productions from some of Australia's best-known theatre companies, including Company B, Sydney Theatre Company, State Theatre Company of South Australia (STCSA), Patch Theatre, and Opera Australia.

Among many performances for STCSA, he played a leading role in Andrew Bovell's 2016 work Things I Know to be True, as well as their co-presentation of Brian Friel's play Faith Healer (directed by Judy Davis co-presented and produced by Belvoir, with Colin Friels taking the main role). Blackwell also played several clown characters: in The Popular Mechanicals, The Ham Funeral, and The Government Inspector, and the title character in the STCSA production of Samuel Beckett's play Eh Joe in 2015.

He starred in Brink Productions' 2008 Adelaide Festival play When the Rain Stops Falling. Other work for the company included The Aspirations of Daise Morrow and Moliere's The Hypochondriac.

In 2014, Blackwell co-directed a children's play for Patch Theatre, Mr McGee and the Biting Flea. The production was described as comprising "whimsical stories [which] emerge from dozens of suitcases and crates as three curious warehouse workers transform a storeroom into enchanting little miracles of music and play". The production toured every state and territory in Australia, and also New Zealand, playing in regional theatres as well as larger venues. Other creative work with Patch included Who Sank the Boat? and The Happiest Show on Earth.

In 2017 Blackwell toured Australia playing Parsons in 1984, a stage adaptation of George Orwell's novel by directors Duncan MacMillan and Robert Icke. It was a Headlong, Almeida Theatre and Nottingham Playhouse production, presented by Sydney Theatre Company in association with STCSA, by arrangement with GWB Entertainment and Ambassador Theatre Group.

=== Film and TV ===
Blackwell appeared in several films, usually in small parts. A major film role was in the 1996 film The Quiet Room directed by Rolf De Heer, which was critically acclaimed and was screened in the 1996 Cannes Film Festival. He had roles in Red Dog and the 2019 remake of Storm Boy. And the silent film Dr. Plonk – another collaboration with Rolf De Heer.

Other appearances in films included Candy, directed by Neil Armfield and starring Heath Ledger; December Boys, starring Daniel Radcliffe; Hey, Hey, It's Esther Blueburger;

Television appearances include Patrol Boat, Colour in the Creek, All Saints, My Place, City Homicide, and Deadline Gallipoli.

== Recognition ==
In 2019 Blackwell received a Premier's Award for Lifetime Achievement posthumously in the South Australian Ruby Awards.

He was also posthumously awarded a Helpmann Award for Best Male Actor in a Supporting Role in a Play, for his role as Teddy Faith Healer.

== Personal life and death ==
Blackwell was married to Lee-Anne, and they had three adult children - Joseph, Dominic, Beatrice.

He died on 24 February 2019, from multiple myeloma. A well-loved and popular man, his memorial in the Burnside Ballroom was packed, with 800 people attending.
