= Matt Nettheim =

Australian photographer

- Born: June 26, 1969 (age 57); England
- Education: Victoria College
- Occupation: Photographer
- Known for: Film still photography
- Relatives: Daniel Nettheim (brother)

Matthew Nettheim (born 26 June 1969) is an Australian photographer specialising in on-set feature film stills photography. In 2005 The Australian newspaper counted Nettheim, along with Mark Rogers and Elise Lockwood, as one of approximately one dozen regular film stills photographers in the Australian market.

Nettheim took the period still shots of recreated crime scenes used in ABC's 2006 television drama The Silence.

== Early life and education ==
Nettheim was born in 1969 in England. He later migrated to Sydney, Australia, with his parents. His mother, Margot Nettheim, was a teacher, and his father, Garth Nettheim, was a law professor and human rights advocate.

In 1984, he moved to Adelaide, South Australia, where he studied fine arts. He later completed a Bachelor of Arts in Fine Art (Photography) at Victoria College in Melbourne.

== Career ==
After graduating, Nettheim began his professional career in Sydney as a photojournalist for The Australian.

He later began working as a stills photographer in the film industry. Encouraged by his brother, the film director Daniel Nettheim, and Rolf de Heer, he began documenting film and television productions. Nettheim first met de Heer while working as a photographer at an arts festival. De Heer later invited him to work as a stills photographer on the low-budget film Dance Me to My Song (1998), which Nettheim has cited as a pivotal moment in his career. In 1999, he was hired by director Phillip Noyce to photograph stills for the films Rabbit-Proof Fence and The Quiet American.

Nettheim subsequently worked on Australian productions including Somersault, Little Fish, Look Both Ways, Jindabyne, Bran Nue Dae, The Eye of the Storm, and The Hunter. His international credits include Hot Fuzz, Where the Wild Things Are, and Attack the Block.

In 2011, Nettheim became one of the first Australians admitted to the Society of Motion Picture Stills Photographers. His work has also been published in the photography book Portraits, a collection of images from approximately three decades of his career.

In later years, Nettheim reduced his involvement in still photography and focused on other activities, including street performance, yoga instruction, and basket weaving. His work has continued to appear in exhibitions, including Starstruck, an exhibition at the Adelaide Film Festival curated by the National Portrait Gallery of Australia as part of a national touring program devoted to portrait photography in Australian cinema. Twelve of his photographs were included in the exhibition, and one of his images was used for the exhibition’s program cover.

== Credits ==
=== Film ===
- Hot Fuzz
- The Quiet American
- Rabbit Proof Fence
- Little Fish
- Where the Wild Things Are
- Another Country

=== Television ===
- The Silence
