= Film Critics Circle of Australia Awards 2006 =

Australian film award

The 15th Film Critics Circle of Australia Awards, 2006, honoured the best in film for 2006.

== Winners ==
Best Film

- Ten Canoes (Rolf de Heer, Julie Ryan)

Best Director

- Ray Lawrence (Jindabyne)

Best Actress

- Abbie Cornish (Candy)

Best Actor

- Shane Jacobson (Kenny)

Best Original Screenplay

- Shane Jacobson and Clayton Jacobson (Kenny)

Best Adapted Screenplay

- Beatrix Christian (Jindabyne)

Best Cinematography

- Ian Jones, Ten Canoes David Williamson (Jindabyne)

Best Editing

- Tania Nehme (Ten Canoes)

Best Actor — Supporting Role

- Geoffrey Rush (Candy)

Best Actress — Supporting Role

- Deborra-Lee Furness (Jindabyne)

Best Music Score:

- Cezary Skubiszewski (The Book of Revelation)

Best Foreign Language Film

- Caché (Hidden) (Director: Michael Haneke, France)

Best Foreign Film – English Language

- Good Night, and Good Luck. (Director: George Clooney)

Best Australian Short Film

- Stranded (dir: Stuart McDonald; Producers: Lizzette Atkins, Beth Frey)

Best Short Documentary (Under 60 Min)

- The Balanda And The Bark Canoes (Directors: Molly Reynolds, Tania Nehme, Rolf De Heer; Producers: Rolf De Heer, Julie Ryan)

Best Feature Documentary

- The Archive Project (Director: John Hughes; Producers: John Hughes, Philippa Campey
- Hunt Angels (Director: Alec Morgan; Producer: Sue Maslin)
