= When Pomegranates Howl =

2021 Afghan-Australian film by Granaz Moussavi

- Festival showcase poster
- Directed by: Granaz Moussavi
- Screenplay by: Granaz Moussavi
- Produced by: Baheer Wardak; Granaz Moussavi; Christine Williams; Marzieh Vafamehr
- Cinematography: Behrouz Badrouj
- Edited by: Shima Monfared; Ali Akhavan; Elias Azizi; Ali Azizi; Nima Nabiliradd
- Music by: Hossein Alizadeh
- Production company: Bonsai Films
- Release date: October 16, 2020 (AFF)
- Running time: 80 minutes
- Countries: Afghanistan; Australia
- Languages: Pashto; Persian

When Pomegranates Howl is a 2020 Afghan-Australian drama film written and directed by Iranian-born Australian filmmaker Granaz Moussavi. The film was partly funded through Adelaide Film Festival, which became its premiere place. It was selected as the Australian entry for the Best International Feature Film at the 94th Academy Awards.

== Plot ==
Based on real events, the film tells the story of Hewad, a nine-year-old boy who lives on the streets in the capital of Afghanistan - Kabul. Following the loss of both his father and brother, Hewad decides to create a business by working as a cart pusher, which he enjoys doing every day. By working as such, and loading the carts with goods, he travels throughout Kabul in the hope to raise enough money for his family. Hewad's dream of becoming a movie star comes to life when he stumbles on an Australian photographer.

== Cast ==
- Arafat Faiz
- Elham Ayazi
- Andrew Quilty

== Production and filming ==
Granaz Moussavi started filming When Pomegranates Howl in Kabul in 2017 after reading Australian headlines of an attack by the Australian armed forces in which two boys - 11 and 12-year-olds were killed. This sad news prompted the director to write a script about a (back then) nine-year-old boy named Hewad.

== Accolades ==
Year	Award	Category	Nominee / work	Result	Ref
2021	Asia Pacific Screen Awards	Best Youth Feature Film	—N/a	Nominated	

== See also ==
- List of submissions to the 94th Academy Awards for Best International Feature Film
- List of Australian submissions for the Academy Award for Best International Feature Film
