= My Tehran for Sale =

2009 Australian film

- Directed by: Granaz Moussavi
- Written by: Granaz Moussavi
- Produced by: Kate Croser; Julie Ryan; Granaz Moussavi
- Starring: Marzieh Vafamehr; Amir Chegini; Asha Mehrabi
- Cinematography: Granaz Moussavi, Bonnie Elliott
- Edited by: Bryan Mason
- Production company: Cyan Films
- Release date: 2009
- Country: Australia

My Tehran for Sale (Persian: تهران من، حراج) is a 2009 Australian film filmed in Iran, written and directed by Iranian-Australian director Granaz Moussavi. It was produced by Cyan Films and stars Marzieh Vafamehr, Amir Chegini, and Asha Mehrabi. The film explores contemporary Tehran and its underground art scene, focusing on the life of a young actress who has been banned from theatre work.

== Plot ==
Marzieh is a young actress living in Tehran. The authorities have banned her, like many other young actors, from doing theatre work, forcing her to lead a secret life in order to express herself artistically. At an underground rave, she meets Saman, who was born in Iran but has become an Australian citizen after migrating there. Saman offers her a way out of Iran and shows Marzieh the possibility of living without fear, but the film also looks at the difficulties faced by migrants.

== Cast ==
- Marzieh Vafamehr, an Iranian documentary filmmaker and actress, as Marzieh
- Amir Chegini, as Saman
- Asha Mehrabi

== Production ==
My Tehran for Sale is an Australian-produced film. It is the debut feature film of writer/director Granaz Moussavi, who won a pitching competition at the Screen Producers Association of Australia conference in 2006. She shot in Tehran in August and September 2008 with a hand-held camera. Moussavi was also involved in post-production work on the film in South Australia, and did not expect the film to be allowed to be shown in Iran (so did not ask permission for this). She moved from Iran to Australia with her parents around 1996, and continued to live between both countries.

The film was the first feature film produced by Adelaide producer Julie Ryan since her many collaborations with director Rolf de Heer, over around a decade, and the first for her company Cyan Films, which she formed with Kate Croser.

== Release ==
My Tehran for Sale had its world premiere at the Adelaide Film Festival in February 2009.

It was an official selection to the 2009 Toronto International Film Festival, and also screened at the 2009 Vancouver International Film Festival, Busan International Film Festival, International Filmfestival Mannheim-Heidelberg. In 2010 it was screened at the Museum of Modern Art in New York, as well as the International Film Festival Rotterdam, International Film Festival Prague - Febiofest, Cinema Novo Film Festival Brugges, CPH:PIX Copenhagen International Film Festival, Guadalajara International Film Festival in Mexico, Sydney Travelling Film Festival, Las Palmas de Gran Canaria International Film Festival, and others.

However, it had limited cinema release in Australia, only being shown in Adelaide and Hobart. A "bare bones" DVD edition was released, with no publicity.

== Reception ==
Australian film scholar Hamish Ford wrote: "Thanks to Marzieh Vafamehr's remarkable central performance and Granaz Moussavi's savage intelligence, the story of My Tehran For Sale has a lot to tell us – about both Australia and Iran, within and outside the film".

Iranian critic and film scholar Parviz Jahed compared My Tehran for Sale with Romanian filmmaker Cristian Mungiu's film 4 Months, 3 Weeks and 2 Days.

=== Accolades ===
- Winner, Independent Spirit Inside Film Award, Sydney
- Winner, Best Feature Film at TriMedia Festival in Colorado, US

== Arrest of Vafamehr ==
Controversy surrounded the film when unauthorised copies of the film were circulated in Tehran. In July 2011, Iranian authorities arrested Vafamehr, reportedly for acting in the film without proper Islamic hijab and with a shaved head. She was sentenced to one year in prison and 90 lashes; however, due to international pressure and various campaigns, an appeals court later reduced her sentence to only three months' imprisonment. She was released in October 2011.

In November 2011 the film was screened in the inaugural Stop Violence Against Women Film Festival in Melbourne 2011, presented by Amnesty International Australia's Victorian Women's Rights team.
