= Kate Croser =

- Occupations: Film producer, film industry executive
- Years active: 2006–present
- Employer: South Australian Film Corporation
- Known for: Top End Wedding (2019), 2067 (2020), First Day (2020)

Kate Croser is an Australian film and television producer and screen executive. As of March 2025 she is CEO of the South Australian Film Corporation (SAFC).

== Career ==
=== Film production ===
In 2007, Croser went into partnership with producer Julie Ryan to form a new production company based in Adelaide, Cyan Films. Cyan's first feature film was initially described as a co-production with Kurdish-Iranian filmmaker Bahman Ghobadi and first time writer/director Granaz Moussavi, called Auction. However, Moussavi's first film was released as My Tehran for Sale, with no mention of Ghobadi, and had its world premiere at the Adelaide Film Festival in February 2009.

Croser produced the 2012 television action comedy series Danger 5 for SBS and the documentary film Michelle's Story for ABC Television.

She established Hedone Productions. In November 2016, Hedone joined South Australian company KOJO to form a new film and television production company, as KOJO Entertainment. Croser was appointed head of production and development, and Hedone's existing projects went with her to KOJO. Kate Butler, who had been leading KOJO's post-production arm, would be working closely with Croser. In 2024 KOJO joined the PMY Group.

=== Executive positions ===
Croser was appointed CEO of the South Australian Film Corporation in August 2019. As of March 2025 she remains in the position.

== Other activities ==
Croser has formerly served on the boards of the SAFC and of Ausfilm, and as feature film representative on the council of Screen Producers Australia.

As of March 2025, Croser serves on several boards and other groups:

- Trustee, Committee for Economic Development of Australia
- Chair, SA Chapter, Chief Executive Women
- Member, SA Leaders for Gender Equity
- Board member, Workskil Australia
- Member of the Creativity and Culture Industry Advisory Board of the University of Adelaide

== Awards and recognition ==
Croser's films have been nominated for and won AACTA Awards.

In 2009 Croser won the Inside Film Independent Spirit Award for My Tehran for Sale, and in 2012 won the Best Short Fiction Film award at the inaugural Australian Academy of Cinema and Television Arts Awards for The Palace.

Hedone Productions was nominated for Australian Screen Business of the Year at the 2015 Screen Producers Australia Awards. In the same year, her ABC documentary Michelle's Story won the Adelaide Film Festival Audience Award.

In February 2020 she was named one of South Australia's Top 50 Most Influential People by the Advertiser.

In October 2021 Croser won for an International Emmy Award for producing the television drama series for children First Day.

In 2023 she was a finalist in The Advertiser / Sunday Mail Woman of the Year Awards in the Leader of the Year category.
