= The King Is Dead! =

- Theatrical film poster
- Directed by: Rolf de Heer
- Written by: Rolf de Heer
- Produced by: Rolf de Heer; Nils Erik Nielsen
- Starring: Dan Wyllie; Bojana Novakovic; Gary Waddell
- Cinematography: Ian Jones
- Edited by: Tania Nehme
- Music by: Graham Tardif
- Production company: Vertigo Productions
- Distributed by: Fandango Portobello Sales; Pinnacle Films
- Release date: 12 July 2012
- Running time: 102 minutes
- Country: Australia
- Language: English
- Budget: A$1.2 million

The King Is Dead! is a 2012 Australian comedy drama thriller film directed by Rolf de Heer about a young couple who are tormented by the neighbour from hell.

== Plot ==
Max and Therese have just moved into a new house, unfortunately they are now next door to a strange man named King (Gary Waddell). At first, things seem to go smoothly until King and his friends become trouble with Max and Therese and they both suspect he may be a drug dealer, so Max and Therese concoct a plan to have King move out of their neighbourhood.

== Cast ==
- Dan Wyllie as Max
- Bojana Novakovic as Therese
- Gary Waddell as King
- Luke Ford as Shrek
- Anthony Hayes as Escobar
- Lani Tupu as Boss Maori

== Production ==
Forty percent of the budget came from Screen Australia, with additional investment from the South Australian Film Corporation, Pinnacle Films, the sales agent Fandango Portobello International, and Chinese investor Bruno Wu's Locus Global Entertainment.

Rolf de Heer wrote and directed The King Is Dead!, with Vertigo Productions producing it along with Nils Erik Nielsen and De Heer. Cinematography was by Ian Jones, production design by Beverley Freeman, and music by Graham Tardif. Tania Nehme edited the film.

The film was shot in and around a house in an Adelaide suburb. It was the first time that filmmaker Rolf de Heer had used digital camerawork rather than widescreen.

== Release ==
The film obtained limited release in four cinemas on 12 July 2012: the Cinema Nova in Melbourne, Luna Cinema in Perth, Hoyts Cinema Paris in Sydney, and the Palace Nova Eastend in Adelaide. Dendy and Palace Cinemas did not release it to all of their cinemas, as they thought that audiences would not like the profuse amount of swearing in it.

== Reception ==
In their television review on ABC Television's At the Movies, Margaret Pomeranz gave the film four stars, while David Stratton gave three. Pomeranz said "Rolf de Heer has made a taut, tense, funny film that features simply wonderful performances from Dan Wyllie and Bojana Novakovic and Gary Waddell is hilarious. Design is great, Ian Jones' cinematography absolutely first rate as you would expect and Tania Nehme's editing seamless".

Sydney Morning Herald reviewer Jake Wilson wrote "it's hard to know whether the film is meant as a jaunty farce or a blackly comic thriller", remarking that it was a curious film from De Heer, but he praised Waddell's acting.

Hollywood Reporter reviewer Megan Lehmann wrote "Rolf de Heer mixes deadpan humor and soft menace for the latest entry in an oeuvre that could only be filed under miscellaneous".

== Accolades ==
In 2012 the film won the Jury Grand Prix, Best feature film, at the Rencontres internationales du cinéma des Antipodes (Antipodean Film Festival).

Award	Category	Subject	Result
AACTA Award (2nd)	Best Supporting Actor	Gary Waddell	Nominated
AFCA Awards	Best Film	Nils Erik Nielsen	Nominated
AFCA Awards	Best Film	Rolf de Heer	Nominated
AFCA Awards	Best Director	Rolf de Heer	Nominated
AFCA Awards	Best Screenplay	Rolf de Heer	Nominated
AFCA Awards	Best Supporting Actor	Gary Waddell	Won
AFCA Awards	Best Music Score	Graham Tardif	Nominated

== See also ==
- Cinema of Australia
