= Bad Boy Bubby =

1993 Australian independent film

- Australian daybill poster
- Directed by: Rolf de Heer
- Written by: Rolf de Heer
- Produced by: Rolf de Heer; Giorgio Draskovic; Domenico Procacci
- Starring: Nicholas Hope; Claire Benito; Ralph Cotterill; Carmel Johnson
- Cinematography: Ian Jones
- Edited by: Suresh Ayyar
- Music by: Graham Tardif
- Production companies: Fandango; South Australian Film Corporation
- Distributed by: Roadshow Entertainment; Umbrella Entertainment
- Release dates: 1 September 1993 (Venice Film Festival); 28 July 1994 (Australia)
- Running time: 114 minutes
- Countries: Australia; Italy
- Languages: English; German
- Budget: A$800,000
- Box office: A$808,789

Bad Boy Bubby is an Australian 1993 crime black comedy-drama film written and directed by Rolf de Heer, and starring Nicholas Hope, Claire Benito, Ralph Cotterill, and Carmel Johnson.

Hope stars as the titular character, a mentally challenged man who has been held captive in his home by his abusive mother for his entire life. The storyline follows his escape from confinement, and subsequent journey of self-discovery. The film was shot on a low budget in Adelaide, and is an international co-production between Australia and Italy.

Bad Boy Bubby premiered at the 50th Venice International Film Festival on 1 September 1993, where it won the Grand Jury Prize. It was released in Australia the following year, and was met with positive reviews, with particular praise being given to Hope's performance and de Heer's direction. Although it was a box office failure, the film has gained a cult following.

== Plot ==
In an industrial area of Adelaide, Bubby is a mentally challenged 35-year-old man who lives in a squalid house with his abusive and religious fanatic mother, Florence. He has never left the house, due to his mother convincing him that the air outside is toxic, and that he would be struck down by Jesus should he leave. He and his mother regularly have incestuous sex, with his mother often encouraging Bubby to fondle her breasts. The two have no other company except for a pet cat, which Bubby inadvertently kills by suffocating it with clingwrap.

One night, Bubby's father Harold returns, having abandoned Florence years earlier to pursue a career as a preacher. Harold did not know he had a son, but he quickly comes to disdain Bubby, and mocks him for his presumed mental disorder. Harold beats Bubby, and encourages Florence to do so as well. Eventually tiring of the abuse, Bubby suffocates his parents with clingwrap, and decides to venture outside for the first time.

Bubby is picked up by members of The Salvation Army, and wanders into the town centre. He is harassed by members of the public for his social ineptitude and strange behaviour. He is later given a lift by a group of men who perform in a rock band, helping them set up a gig. The band take a liking to Bubby, but are also unnerved by his odd actions. After reading a newspaper that reports on the murder of Bubby's parents and inferring that he is the killer, the band members decide to send him to stay with their friend Dan.

Dan and Bubby go out for dinner, but Bubby fondles a woman and is arrested. He is sent to jail, but is unwilling to talk with the warden. As punishment, he sends Bubby into a separate cell, where he is raped by a large inmate, "The Animal". The prison chief then deems him to be rehabilitated, and lets him go.

Bubby enters a church, and converses with a man there, "The Scientist", who tells Bubby that God does not exist, and it is the job of humans to "think God out of existence" and take responsibility for themselves. Bubby goes to a pub and fondles another woman, and is beaten by her friends. Overwhelmed, Bubby returns to his home as he believes that there is no place for him in the world. He dons his father's clothes and assumes the personality of "Pop".

With newfound confidence, Bubby returns to town and finds a stray cat, who he vows to take care of. He goes to the club where the rock band are performing, and joins them on stage, where he delivers a bizarre performance, repeating phrases he has heard from various people. His performance is a success with the crowd, and he goes back to feed the cat, but is distraught to see that it has been killed by local hoodlums.

Upset, Bubby encounters a nurse named Angel, who cares for people with physical disabilities. They return to the care centre, and Bubby becomes infatuated with her breasts, as they remind him of his mother's. Angel and Bubby become lovers, and Bubby returns to performing with the rock band, becoming a sensation with audiences.

Angel invites him to have dinner with her strict, religious parents. Angel's parents humiliate her by mocking her weight, enraging Bubby, who curses at God in retaliation, before her parents demand he leave. Bubby kills Angel's parents with clingwrap, and the two continue their relationship. Finally at peace with himself, Bubby and Angel later have multiple children.

== Cast ==
- Nicholas Hope as Bubby
- Claire Benito as Mam (Flo/Florence)
- Ralph Cotterill as Pop (Harold)
- Carmel Johnson as Angel
- Paul Philpot as Paul (band singer)
- Todd Telford as Little Greg (keyboards)
- Paul Simpson as Big Greg (drummer)
- Stephen Smooker as Middle Greg (bass)
- Peter Monaghan as Steve (guitarist)
- Mark Brouggy as Mark (roadie)
- Bruce Gilbert as Dan
- Michael Constantinou as The Animal
- Alec Talbot as Prison Superintendent
- Norman Kaye as The Scientist
- Rachael Huddy as herself
- Bridget Walters as Angel's Mother
- Graham Duckett as Angel's Father
- Grant Piro as Salesman
- Syd Brisbane as Yobbo

== Production ==
Shortly after graduating from film school, Rolf de Heer collaborated with Ritchie Singer on the idea of what would eventually become Bad Boy Bubby. For most of the 1980s, de Heer collected ideas and wrote them on index cards. In 1987, he took a hiatus from making Bubby index cards, but in 1989 he resumed work. In 1989 or 1990 he saw the short film Confessor Caressor starring Nicholas Hope (which would eventually be included on the bonus DVD when Bad Boy Bubby was first released on DVD in 2004) and tracked him down. In 1991, de Heer began work on the actual script.

After he heard a rumour about the reintroduction of the death penalty to Australia, de Heer was angered and rewrote the ending so that Bubby would be executed at the end of the film. This ending was scrapped when the rumour proved false.

Filming took place in Port Adelaide between 30 November 1992 and 16 January 1993.

The people with cerebral palsy Bubby meets are not actors, but actual disabled people. Hope, who was raised Catholic, found the scenes where Bubby curses God in front of Angel's parents difficult to film.

Director de Heer describes the film as one large experiment, especially in the method used to record the dialogue: binaural microphones were sewn into the wig worn by leading actor Nicholas Hope, one above each ear. This gave the soundtrack a unique and claustrophobic sound that closely resembled what the character would actually be hearing. The film also used 31 individual directors of photography to shoot different scenes. Once Bubby leaves the apartment a different director of photography is used for every location until the last third of the film, allowing an individual visual slant on everything Bubby sees for the first time. No director of photography was allowed to refer to the work of the others.

== Animal cruelty allegation ==
When the film was released in Italy, a coalition of animal rights groups tried to set up a boycott of Australian products, alleging that Bubby's pet cat was wrapped in plastic wrapping and suffocated to death on film, but Rolf de Heer has said that none of that is true; the cat scenes were carefully filmed, with a veterinarian and animal cruelty inspector on set. Nicholas Hope, in an on-stage interview included on the DVD of the film, says there were two cats, one of which became a pet of a crew member. The other was a feral cat that was put down by a vet after filming (as with most feral cats that are caught in Australia). Film critic Mark Kermode left the screening due to the apparent animal abuse in the making of the film.

== Awards ==
Award	Category	Subject	Result
AACTA Awards (1994 AFI Awards)	Best Film	Giorgio Draskovic	Nominated
AACTA Awards (1994 AFI Awards)	Best Film	Domenico Procacci	Nominated
AACTA Awards (1994 AFI Awards)	Best Film	Rolf de Heer	Nominated
AACTA Awards (1994 AFI Awards)	Best Direction	Rolf de Heer	Won
AACTA Awards (1994 AFI Awards)	Best Original Screenplay	Rolf de Heer	Won
AACTA Awards (1994 AFI Awards)	Best Actor	Nicholas Hope	Won
AACTA Awards (1994 AFI Awards)	Best Cinematography	Ian Jones	Nominated
AACTA Awards (1994 AFI Awards)	Best Editing	Suresh Ayyar	Won
Seattle International Film Festival	Golden Space Needle Award for Best Director	Rolf de Heer	Won
Valenciennes International Festival	Audience Award	Rolf de Heer	Won
Venice Film Festival	FIPRESCI Prize	Rolf de Heer	Won
Venice Film Festival	Grand Special Jury Prize	Rolf de Heer	Won
Venice Film Festival	Special Golden Ciak	Rolf de Heer	Won
Venice Film Festival	Golden Lion	Rolf de Heer	Nominated

== Release ==
Bad Bobby Bubby premiered at the 50th Venice International Film Festival, winning the Grand Jury Prize on 11 September 1993. The film first screened in Australian cinemas on 28 July 1994, and was released on VHS by Roadshow Entertainment early the following year. Bad Boy Bubby grossed $808,789 at the box office in Australia. The film was very successful in Norway, making Hope an actor in demand there.

On 23 April 2007, Eureka Entertainment released Bad Boy Bubby on DVD for the UK market with all scenes intact. On the Blue Underground DVD, director Rolf de Heer claims that Bubby was the second highest-grossing film in Norway in 1995. In the UK, it was cut for cruelty to a cat. The film was released on DVD in April 2005 in the United States by the Blue Underground company, and a special Two Disc Collectors' Edition was also released in Australia in June 2005 by Umbrella Entertainment. Umbrella reissued the film on Blu-ray in February 2021, newly remastered from the original negative. The Blu-ray contained all the special features from the 2005 DVD, plus a Q&A session with Nicholas Hope and Natalie Carr and a 25th anniversary commentary. The film had previously been released on Blu-ray in Australia in 2011.

== Reception ==
Bad Boy Bubby received positive reviews from critics. Upon its premiere at the Venice Film Festival, Derek Malcolm of The Guardian hailed the film as the festival's "biggest surprise", a "small epic" that is "highly imperfect but astonishingly audacious and original", and compared it favourably to David Lynch's Eraserhead and Mike Leigh's Naked. David Stratton awarded it five stars out of five in a highly complimentary review on his television program The Movie Show, remarking, "I really think this is one of the finest and most original of all Australian films that I've seen. I really think it's a milestone in Australian cinema". In a positive review for The Age, Neil Jillett described Bad Boy Bubby as "shocking, disgusting, silly, pompous exploitative and cruel" while also conceding it was an "extraordinary" film that "stays in the mind". He gave praise to Hope's "brilliant" performance but directed criticism to the "clumsy" final act. For The New York Times, Ken Shulman commended the film as "electrically entertaining", and gave plaudits to Hope's performance and de Heer's "fast-paced direction".

The film also holds a 100% approval rating on the review aggregation site Rotten Tomatoes, based on 10 reviews, with a weighted average of 7.9/10.

== See also ==
- Cinema of Australia

== Works cited ==
- Hickey-Moody, Anna; Iocco, Melissa (January 2004). "Sonic affect(s): Binaural technologies and the construction of auratorship in Rolf de Heer's Bad Boy Bubby". Metro Magazine. 140. Australian Teachers of Media: 78–81.
