= 2007 Adelaide Film Festival =

Australian film festival

- Opening film: Lucky Miles
- Closing film: Dr Plonk
- Location: Adelaide, Australia
- Founded: 2002
- Awards: International Award for Best Feature Film (Still Life); Don Dunstan Award (Rolf de Heer)
- Directors: Katrina Sedgwick
- No. of films: 13 (In Competition)
- Festival date: 22 February – 4 March 2007
- Website: adelaidefilmfestival.org

The 2007 Adelaide Film Festival was the 3rd edition of the Adelaide Film Festival. It took place in Adelaide, South Australia, from 22 February to 4 March 2007. Katrina Sedgwick was again Festival Director. Rolf de Heer received the 2007 Don Dunstan Award for his contribution to the Australian film industry.

The festival opened with Australian drama Lucky Miles, directed by Michael James Rowland, 22 February, and closed with the silent black and white comedy Dr Plonk, directed by Rolf de Heer, on 4 March. Both films had received funding from the Adelaide Film Festival Investment Fund. In all, the festival presented 12 new Australian movies in which it had invested.

The inaugural Natuzzi International Award for Best Feature Film was won by the Chinese film Still Life, directed and written by Jia Zhang-ke.

== Competition ==
=== Jury ===
The following people were selected for the In Competition Jury:

- Noah Cowan, Toronto International Film Festival director (President)
- J. M. Coetzee, South African writer
- James Hewison, Melbourne International Film Festival director
- Ana Kokkinos, Australian film director
- Clara Law, Hong Kong film director
- Margaret Pomeranz, Australian film critic, producer and television personality
- Mick Harvey, Australian musician, singer-songwriter, composer, arranger and record producer

=== In Competition ===
The following films were selected for the In Competition section:

English title	Original title	Director(s)	Production country/countries
Bamako	Bamako	Abderrahmane Sissako	France/Mali
Boxing Day	Boxing Day	Kriv Stenders	Australia
Colossal Youth	Juventude Em Marcha	Pedro Costa	France/Portugal/ Switzerland
Family Law	Derecho De Familia	Daniel Burman	Argentina/Italy/ France/Spain
Grbavica	Grbavica	Jasmila Žbanić	Austria/Bosnia/ Germany/Croatia
Half Moon	Nîwe Mang/Nîvê Heyvê	Bahman Ghobadi	Austria/France/Iran/Iraq
The Home Song Stories	The Home Song Stories	Tony Ayres	Australia
The Lives Of Others	Das Leben Der Anderen	Florian Henckel von Donnersmarck	Germany
Madeinusa	Madeinusa	Claudia Llosa	Peru/Spain
Red Road	Red Road	Andrea Arnold	UK/Denmark
Still Life	Still Life	Jia Zhangke	China/Hong Kong
Syndromes and a Century	Syndromes and a Century	Apichatpong Weerasethakul	Thailand/Austria/ France

== Awards ==
Don Dunstan Award

The Don Dunstan Award was won by Rolf de Heer.

== Festival poster and controversy ==

The festival's poster depicted a film festival "Eyeball guy" concept, developed originally by marketing manager Nick Zuppar and graphic designer Amy Milhinch. A small controversy arose when a similar poster design was employed for the 28th Durban International Film Festival (20 June to 1 July 2007). After discussions, the coincidence was eventually put down to "synchronicity".
