= Film Critics Circle of Australia Awards 2004 =

Australian film award

The 14th Film Critics Circle of Australia Awards, given on 7 November 2004, in Sydney, which honoured the best in film for 2004.

== Winners ==
Credits:

- Best Film: Somersault produced by Anthony Anderson
- Best Director: Cate Shortland for Somersault
- Best Cinematography: Robert Humphreys for Somersault
- Best Editor: Ken Sallows for Tom White
- Best Actor – Lead Role: Colin Friels for Tom White
- Best Actress – Lead Role: Abbie Cornish for Somersault
- Best Actor – Supporting Role: Dan Spielman for Tom White
- Best Actress – Supporting Role: Lynette Curran for Somersault
- Best Screenplay – Adapted: Rolf de Heer for The Old Man Who Read Love Stories
- Best Screenplay – Original: Daniel Keene for Tom White
- Best Music Score: David Hobson, Josh Abrahams, Lisa Gerrard for One Perfect Day
- Best Foreign Film - English Language: Lost in Translation directed by Sofia Coppola
- Best Foreign Language Film: The Barbarian Invasions (Les invasions barbares) directed by Denys Arcand
- Best Feature Documentary: The Men Who Would Conquer China directed by Nick Torrens, Jane St Vincent Welch
- Best Short Documentary: Mr Patterns directed by Catriona McKenzie
- Best Short Film: Birthday Boy directed by Sejong Park
- Emerging Talent: Sejong Park
