= Another Country (2015 film) =

2015 Australian documentary film

- Film poster
- Directed by: Molly Reynolds
- Written by: David Gulpilil; Rolf de Heer; Molly Reynolds
- Produced by: Rolf de Heer; Peter Djigirr; Molly Reynolds
- Narrated by: David Gulpilil
- Cinematography: Matt Nettheim
- Edited by: Tania Nehme
- Release date: 31 July 2015 (Melbourne)
- Running time: 75 minutes
- Country: Australia
- Languages: English; Yolngu Matha

Another Country is a 2015 documentary film about the intersection of traditional Australian Aboriginal culture and modern Australian culture. It features actor David Gulpilil narrating a story about his home community of Ramininging in the Northern Territory.

== Synopsis ==
The documentary examines how a traditional way of life has been disrupted by a dominant new culture, and the consequences that has had for the Yolngu people. It speaks in particular of the Ramingining community but reflects on more universal ramifications for remote communities in Australia. Another Country is aimed at a non-Indigenous audience and intends to help the audience understand Aboriginal culture and listen to what Aboriginal people have to say.

David Gulpilil, the Yolngu actor who narrates Another Country, described the documentary as "the best thing anyone can learn about us!".

== Release ==
Another Country premiered at the Melbourne International Film Festival in 2015. It was selected to screen at the Cannes Film Festival in 2016.

== Accolades ==
Another County was nominated for two awards at the 6th AACTA Awards: Best Cinematography in a Documentary award and Best Sound in a Documentary. The documentary won the Grand Prix at the 2016 FIFO Pacific International Film Festival. At the 2016 ATOM Awards it won Best Documentary – General, as well as Best Documentary – History and Best Documentary – Social & Political Issues.
