= My Name Is Gulpilil =

2021 film directed by Molly Reynolds

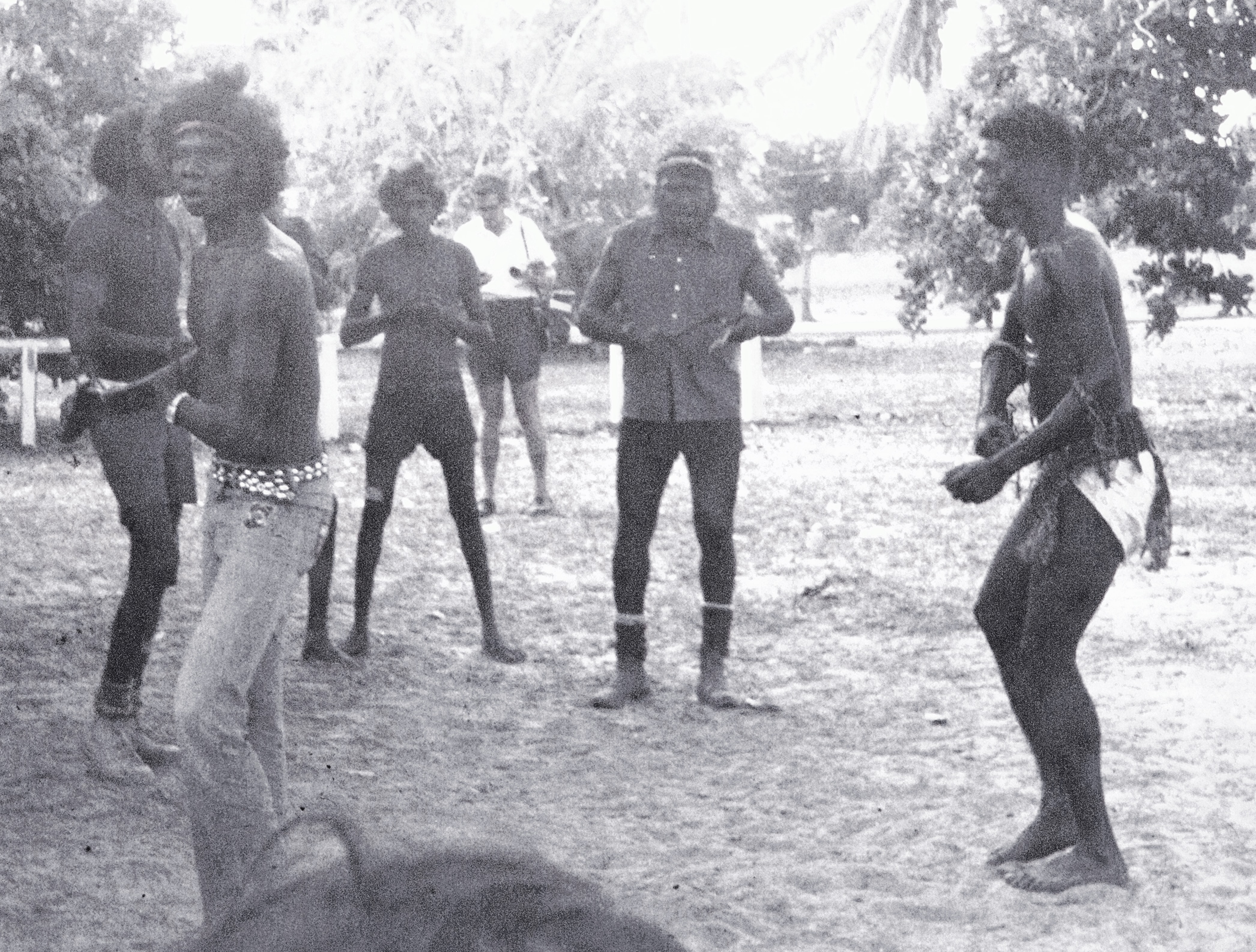
David Gulpilil at dance practice at Lajamanu (formerly Hooker Creek), Northern Territory.

My Name Is Gulpilil is a 2021 documentary film about the life of celebrated Australian actor David Gulpilil, at the time sick with stage four lung cancer.

== Synopsis ==
The film covers Gulpilil's acting career, his life in Murray Bridge, the cancer, alcohol addiction, and his various marriages and relationships.

== Production ==
My Name is Gulpilil was directed by Australian filmmaker Molly Reynolds.

It was mostly shot in 2017, with the expectation that Gulpilil (who died in November 2021) would not live much longer. The use of Gulpilil's name in the title, potentially problematic in Aboriginal culture after his death, was a deliberate choice by the actor.

== Release ==
The film was released as part of the Adelaide Festival on 12 March 2021.

== Reception ==
=== Critical response ===
On Rotten Tomatoes, the documentary holds an approval rating of 100% based on 10 reviews, with an average rating of 8/10.

== Awards ==
- Australian Academy of Cinema and Television Arts Award (AACTA): Winner, Best Documentary (Molly Reynolds, Rolf de Heer, Peter Djigirr, David Gulpilil); Best Editing in a documentary (Tania Nehme)
- Australian Screen Editors Award: Nominated for Best Editing in a Documentary Feature (Tania Nehme)
- Atom Awards: Finalist in three categories (Best Documentary – Arts; Best Documentary – Biography; Best Documentary – History); winner in the Biography and History categories
