= Molly Reynolds =

Molly Reynolds may refer to:

- Molly Reynolds (director), screenwriter and director of Australian films.
- List of EastEnders characters (2009)#Molly Reynolds, character in the UK series EastEnders.
