= Graham Tardif =

Australian composer

- Born: 1957 (age 68–69); Melbourne, Victoria, Australia
- Origin: Australia
- Occupation: Composer

Graham Tardif (born 1957) is an Australian screen music composer. He is the composer on ten feature films directed and written by Rolf de Heer. Their most acclaimed collaboration, The Tracker (2002), resulted in an APRA-AGSC Screen Music Award for "Far Away Home" as Best Original Song Composed for a Feature Film, Telemovie, TV Series or Mini-Series (shared with de Heer) in 2002. The Tracker also provided wins at Film Critics Circle of Australia Awards (Best Music Score) and IF Awards (Best Music) for the pair.

== History ==
Graham Tardif was born in 1957. He attended Australian Film, Television and Radio School (AFTRS), Sydney. There he met Dutch-born writer, director and producer Rolf de Heer, for whom he composed screen music on ten feature films. They first worked on de Heer's short film, The Audition (1979), for his AFTRS diploma. Tail of a Tiger (1984) had Tardif composing the score for de Heer's first feature film. Fellow composer and musicologist Cat Hope analysed Tardif and de Heer's works including The Tracker (2002) and Alexandra's Project (2003). She observed, "Tardif's minimal electronic score in Alexandra's Project implies the undercurrent of invisible electro-magnetic signals in an urban landscape, making an ordinary street seem like a harbinger of impending doom." Their "most meaningful collaboration" was on The Tracker where songs were delivered by Indigenous artist Archie Roach, which "not only adds an extra layer of narrative to the film, but also personalises the de Heer/Tardif working relationship and gives it a new voice."

== Filmography ==
Credited as composer:

- The Sparks Obituary (short, 1978)
- Tasmania's South West: a Wilderness in Question (documentary, 1979)
- The Audition (short, 1979)
- Tail of a Tiger (1984)
- Thank You Jack (TV film, 1986)
- Incident at Raven's Gate (1988)
- Difficult Pleasure: A Portrait of Brett Whiteley (1989)
- Astonish Me, Graeme Murphy Choreographer (1989)
- Antarctica: Physical Geography (short documentary, 1991)
- Bad Boy Bubby (1993)
- Epsilon a.k.a. Alien Visitor (1995)
- The Quiet Room (1996)
- Dance Me to My Song (1998)
- Terra Nova (1998)
- The Old Man Who Read Love Stories (2001)
- The Tracker (2002)
- Alexandra's Project (2003)
- Dr. Plonk (2007)
- The King Is Dead! (2012)
- Charlie's Country (2013)
- Still Our Country (2014)

== Accolades ==
Year	Nominated work	Category	Award	Result	Notes	Ref.
1988	Incident at Raven's Gate	Best Original Music Score	AFI Awards	Nominated	(shared with Roman Kronen)	
2003	Alexandra's Project	Best Original Music Score	AFI Awards	Nominated		
2003	The Old Man Who Read Love Stories	Best Original Music Score	AFI Awards	Nominated		
2002	"Far Away Home"	Best Original Song Composed for a Feature Film, Telemovie, TV Series or Mini-Series	APRA-AGSC Screen Music Awards	Won	(shared with Rolf de Heer)	
2002	The Tracker	Best Original Soundtrack Album	ARIA Music Awards	Nominated	(shared with Rolf de Heer and Archie Roach)	
2002	The Tracker	Best Music Score	Film Critics Circle of Australia Awards	Won	(shared with Rolf de Heer)	
2008	Dr. Plonk	Best Music Score	Film Critics Circle of Australia Awards	Nominated		
2002	The Tracker	Best Music	IF Awards	Won		
