= Helen Buday =

Australian actress and singer

- Born: 1962 (age 63–64); Melbourne, Victoria, Australia
- Occupations: Actress, singer
- Years active: 1983–present

Helen Buday (born 1962) is an Australian actress and singer. She is known for her role as Savannah Nix in the film Mad Max Beyond Thunderdome. She was awarded Best Actress at the 48th Valladolid International Film Festival in 2003 for her role in Alexandra's Project.

== Biography ==
Buday graduated from the National Institute for Dramatic Art in 1983, and has since become one of Australia's leading theatre actresses. She has performed with most theatre companies, including roles in A Midsummer Night's Dream, Three Sisters, The Importance of Being Earnest, and A Doll's House.

Buday is also a singer, and she has portrayed the lead roles in My Fair Lady, Cabaret, High Society, and The Threepenny Opera.

She made her major screen debut as Savannah Nix, leader of the feral children, in Mad Max Beyond Thunderdome.

Besides her regular theatre work, she has also appeared in various television series including Land of Hope, Secrets, Water Rats, and Stingers.

== Filmography ==
=== Film ===
Year	Title	Role	Type
1985	Mad Max Beyond Thunderdome	Savannah Nix	Feature film
1986	For Love Alone	Teresa	Feature film
1991	Dingo	Jane Anderson	Feature film
1992	Road to Alice	Alice	Film short
2001	Let's Get Skase	Judith Turner	Feature film
2003	Alexandra's Project	Alexandra / Wife	Feature film
2022	Passing Through	Janet	Feature film

=== Television ===
Year	Title	Role	Type
1984	Five Mile Creek	Guest role: Bess	TV series, 1 episode
1985	The Making of Mad Max III: Beyond Thunderdome	Herself	TV special
1986	Land of Hope	Regular role: Sarah Quinn	TV miniseries, 10 episodes
1986	The 1986 Australian Film Institute Awards	Nominee – Best Actress in Leading Role (for For Love Alone)	TV special
1989	Shadow of the Cobra	Recurring role: Monique Leclerc	TV miniseries, 2 episodes
1992	In Sydney Today	Guest	TV series, 1 episode
1993	Secrets	Guest role	TV series, 1 episode
1996	Water Rats	Guest role: Peggy Newland	TV series, 1 episode
2002	Stingers	Guest role: Lois Dunlap	TV series, 1 episode
2003	All Saints	Guest role: Belinda Mawson	TV series, 1 episode
2008	Alexandra's Project: In the Eye of the Beholder	Herself	Video
2016-2019	Butterfly Effect (aka Points de Reperes)	Herself	TV series FRANCE, 39 episodes
2021	Dingo: Helen Buday in Conversation with Paul Harris	Interviewee	Video

=== Accolades ===
Year	Award	Film	Result
1986	AACTA Award for Best Actress in a Leading Role	For Love Alone	Nominated
2003	AACTA Award for Best Actress in a Leading Role	Alexandra's Project	Nominated
2003	FCCA Award for Best Actor - Female	Alexandra's Project	Nominated
2003	Inside Film Award for Best Actress	Alexandra's Project	Nominated
2003	Valladolid International Film Festival Award for Best Actress	Alexandra's Project	Won
