= The Old Man Who Read Love Stories =

2001 film by Rolf de Heer

- DVD cover
- Directed by: Rolf de Heer
- Screenplay by: Rolf de Heer
- Based on: Novel by Luis Sepulveda
- Produced by: Michelle de Broca; Julie Ryan
- Starring: Richard Dreyfuss; Timothy Spall; Hugo Weaving
- Cinematography: Denis Lenoir
- Edited by: Tania Nehme
- Music by: Fernando Sancho; Graham Tardif
- Production company: Vertigo Productions
- Release date: 2001
- Running time: 115 minutes
- Country: Australia
- Language: English
- Box office: $AU181,287

The Old Man Who Read Love Stories is a 2001 French/Australian/Dutch/Spanish adventure drama film directed by Rolf de Heer, based on the book of the same name by Luis Sepúlveda. It was not released into cinemas until 2004.

== Plot ==
Antonio Bolivar has lived most of his life in a small riverside hut in a remote spot in the Amazon basin, on his own after his wife had died soon after their arrival there. He reads voraciously, borrowing books from a young woman called Josefina, who works for the corrupt local mayor Luis Agalla. Agalla insists that Bolivar accompanies him with a group who start hunting a female jaguar which has been stalking and killing people near the village. Bolivar begins to reflect on the truths and beauties of life as the film progresses.

== Cast ==
- Richard Dreyfuss as Antonio Bolivar
- Timothy Spall as Mayor Luis Agalla
- Hugo Weaving as Rubicondo the dentist
- Cathy Tyson as Josefina
- Victor Bottenbley as Nushino
- Fede Celada as Juan
- Luis Hostalot as Manuel
- Guillermo Toledo as Onecen
- Jerome Ehlers as Gringo

== Production ==
The film is based on a short novel by Chilean writer Luis Sepúlveda, and directed by Rolf de Heer.

The producer attached to the film was French producer Michelle de Broca, who had purchased the rights to Sepúlveda's book, and it went ahead as a French/Australian co-production. De Heer discarded the script that had been written and wrote his own adaptation. His relationship with De Broca soured, as they conflicted in their approach to the film. Working with an "old school" French producer differed from his holistic style, but he later said "But she was a very gracious lady in other respects", and also that this film was "the most reflective of me as a human being". Before the release, in communication with the French producers, he realised that they were "still after the full-on masculine semi-exploitative hunting film [based on the original script], rather than the gentle, beautiful and romantic film I'd written and we'd shot".

The film ended up as a French/Australian/Dutch/Spanish co-production; Julie Ryan as co-Producer in Australia, Eddy Wijngaarde in the Netherlands, and Inaki Nunez in Spain. Tania Nehme edited the film, and Australian composer Graham Tardif composed the score.

French cinematographer Denis Lenoir was responsible for shooting the film, and Vertigo Productions was the film production studio. Ernst Goldschmidt was executive producer.

== Release ==
The premiered in 2001, but was not seen in cinemas until 11 March 2004.

== Reception ==
The Age critic called the film "a tale of life, death and atonement", that is " something much calmer and more leisurely" than De Heer's two films made since this one, but released before it: The Tracker (2002) and Alexandra's Project (2003).

== Awards and nominations ==
Award	Category	Subject	Result
AACTA Award (2004 AFI Awards)	Best Film	Michelle de Broca	Nominated
AACTA Award (2004 AFI Awards)	Best Film	Julie Ryan	Nominated
AACTA Award (2004 AFI Awards)	Best Supporting Actor	Hugo Weaving	Nominated
AACTA Award (2004 AFI Awards)	Best Editing	Tania Nehme	Nominated
AACTA Award (2004 AFI Awards)	Best Original Music Score	Fernando Sancho	Nominated
AACTA Award (2004 AFI Awards)	Best Original Music Score	Graham Tardif	Nominated
Cinema Writers Circle Award, Spain	Best Screenplay, Adapted	Rolf de Heer	Nominated
FCCA Awards	Best Film	Michelle de Broca	Nominated
FCCA Awards	Best Film	Julie Ryan	Nominated
FCCA Awards	Best Director	Rolf de Heer	Nominated
FCCA Awards	Best Adapted Screenplay	Rolf de Heer	Won
FCCA Awards	Best Actor	Richard Dreyfuss	Nominated
FCCA Awards	Best Supporting Actor	Hugo Weaving	Nominated
FCCA Awards	Best Cinematography	Denis Lenoir	Nominated
FCCA Awards	Best Editing	Tania Nehme	Nominated
Inside Film Awards	Best Feature Film	Michelle de Broca	Nominated
Inside Film Awards	Best Feature Film	Julie Ryan	Nominated
Inside Film Awards	Best Feature Film	Rolf de Heer	Nominated
Inside Film Awards	Best Direction	Rolf de Heer	Nominated
Inside Film Awards	Best Script	Rolf de Heer	Nominated
Inside Film Awards	Best Cinematography	Denis Lenoir	Nominated
Inside Film Awards	Best Editing	Tania Nehme	Won
