= Charlie's Country =

2013 film

- Theatrical release poster
- Directed by: Rolf de Heer
- Written by: Rolf de Heer; David Gulpilil
- Produced by: Rolf de Heer; Peter Djigirr; Nils Erik Nielsen
- Starring: David Gulpilil; Luke Ford
- Cinematography: Ian Jones
- Edited by: Tania Nehme
- Music by: Graham Tardif
- Release dates: 12 October 2013 (Adelaide); 22 May 2014 (Cannes)
- Running time: 108 minutes
- Country: Australia
- Languages: Yolngu Matha; English

Charlie's Country is a 2013 Australian drama film directed by Rolf de Heer. It was selected to compete in the Un Certain Regard section at the 2014 Cannes Film Festival where David Gulpilil won the award for Best Actor. It was also screened in the Contemporary World Cinema section at the 2014 Toronto International Film Festival and awarded the Best Fiction Prize and the Youth Jury Prize at the 2015 International Film Festival and Forum on Human Rights (FIFDH) in Geneva.

The film was selected as the Australian entry for the Best Foreign Language Film at the 87th Academy Awards, but was not nominated.

== Plot ==
Charlie, an Aboriginal man who lives in Arnhem Land, in the Northern Territory of Australia, paints tree barks and fishes barramundi, all the while feeling out of place in an Australia which is no longer his. He laments the loss of his culture in modern Australia. After his spear is confiscated by the police, who think it is a weapon, he decides to leave his urban Aboriginal community and go back to the bush, his "Mother Country". He falls ill and is rushed to the hospital in Darwin. He discharges himself, then befriends an Aboriginal woman and buys alcohol illegally for other Aboriginal people who are banned from buying alcohol, and he gets arrested. As a result, he is sent to prison.

When he gets out, he agrees to pass on traditional dances from his generation to young Aboriginal boys, fearing the loss of their cultural identity.

== Cast ==
- Peter Djigirr as Pete "Black Pete"
- Luke Ford as Luke
- Jennifer Budukpuduk Gaykamangu as Faith
- David Gulpilil as Charlie
- Peter Minygululu as Old Lulu
- Ritchie Singer as Darwin Doctor
- Gary Sweet as Darwin Liquor Store Owner
- Daniel Wyllie as Community Doctor
- Gary Waddell as Gaz
- John Brumpton as Policeman Brum

== Reception ==
=== Critical response ===
Charlie's Country has an approval rating of 95% on review aggregator website Rotten Tomatoes, based on 39 reviews, and an average rating of 7.6/10. The website's critical consensus states: "Powerfully performed and beautifully directed, Charlie's Country uses its protagonist's personal saga to explore poignant universal themes". Metacritic assigned the film a weighted average score of 75 out of 100, based on 9 critics, indicating "generally favorable reviews". Audiences surveyed by CinemaScore gave the film an average grade of "B" on an A+ to F scale.

Jane Howard of The Guardian wrote a positive review of the film. She argued that the "camera is often motionless and there is a sense of still photography to the work." She added that Gulpilil's flawless acting carried the movie. In the Sydney Morning Herald, Paul Byrnes also praised his "extraordinary grace and physical ease" as an actor. He added, "The level of trust between actor and director here is part of the reason this work will live on." Similarly, writing for The Hollywood Reporter, David Rooney praised the collaboration between de Heer and Gulpilil, arguing, "It's a testament to what de Heer and Gulpilil have achieved here -- with simplicity and infinite nuance -- that through all the highs and devastating lows we witness in this brief chapter of Charlie's life, the character's identity remains etched into every aspect of the performance."

In Variety, Eddie Cockrell praised the cinematography, concluding, "The tech package is seamless. Ian Jones’ widescreen photography immerses the viewer in the Australian outback, while Graham Tardif’s plaintive score emphasizes both the dignity and the anguish of Charlie’s all-too-common plight." In The Australian, Evan Williams called it an "unforgettable film, beautifully made, at times unbearably sad, but tinged with an unquenchable optimism and humanity." He added that some scenes were likely to provoke racism in some viewers, thus helping them question their own ingrained prejudices.

However, writing for the ABC's Radio National, Jason Di Rosso wrote a negative review. He called it "another disappointment in that category of ambitious Australian filmmaking that’s about trying to make art, as well as entertain". He thought that the film lacked ambiguity, adding that there are "thinly drawn racist characters and an inability to render different tones in the one visual idea". He disagreed with other reviewers about de Heer and Gulpilil's close relationship: for Di Rosso, "de Heer hasn’t shown enough faith in his central performer and the collection of beautiful and ugly landscapes he’s drawn together".

=== Accolades ===
Award	Category	Subject	Result
AACTA Awards (4th)	Best Film	Nils Erik Nielsen	Nominated
AACTA Awards (4th)	Best Film	Peter Djigirr	Nominated
AACTA Awards (4th)	Best Film	Rolf de Heer	Nominated
AACTA Awards (4th)	Best Direction	Rolf de Heer	Nominated
AACTA Awards (4th)	Best Original Screenplay	Rolf de Heer	Nominated
AACTA Awards (4th)	Best Original Screenplay	David Gulpilil	Nominated
AACTA Awards (4th)	Best Actor	David Gulpilil	Won
AACTA Awards (4th)	Best Sound	James Currie	Nominated
AACTA Awards (4th)	Best Sound	Tom Heuzenroeder	Nominated
Adelaide Film Festival	Foxtel Movies Audience Award for Best Feature	Rolf de Heer	Won
AFCA Awards	Best Film	Nils Erik Nielsen	Nominated
AFCA Awards	Best Film	Peter Djigirr	Nominated
AFCA Awards	Best Film	Rolf de Heer	Nominated
AFCA Awards	Best Director	Rolf de Heer	Nominated
AFCA Awards	Best Screenplay	Rolf de Heer	Won
AFCA Awards	Best Screenplay	David Gulpilil	Won
AFCA Awards	Best Actor	David Gulpilil	Won
AFCA Awards	Best Cinematography	Ian Jones	Won
Asia Pacific Screen Awards	Achievement in Directing	Rolf de Heer	Nominated
Asia Pacific Screen Awards	Best Actor	David Gulpilil	Nominated
Cannes Film Festival	Un Certain Regard – Best Actor	David Gulpilil	Won
Cannes Film Festival	Un Certain Regard Award	Rolf de Heer	Nominated
FCCA Awards	Best Film	Nils Erik Nielsen	Won
FCCA Awards	Best Film	Peter Djigirr	Won
FCCA Awards	Best Film	Rolf de Heer	Won
FCCA Awards	Best Director	Rolf de Heer	Won
FCCA Awards	Best Screenplay	Rolf de Heer	Nominated
FCCA Awards	Best Screenplay	David Gulpilil	Nominated
FCCA Awards	Best Actor	David Gulpilil	Nominated
FCCA Awards	Best Cinematography	Ian Jones	Nominated

== See also ==
- List of submissions to the 87th Academy Awards for Best Foreign Language Film
- List of Australian submissions for the Academy Award for Best Foreign Language Film
