= The Space Between (2016 Australian film) =

2016 film

- Film poster
- Directed by: Ruth Borgobello
- Written by: Ruth Borgobello
- Starring: Flavio Parenti; Maeve Dermody; Lino Guanciale
- Release date: September 2016
- Running time: 100 minutes
- Countries: Australia; Italy
- Language: Italian
- Box office: $19,745

The Space Between is a 2016 Australian-Italian drama film directed by Ruth Borgobello. It was selected as the Australian entry for the Best Foreign Language Film at the 90th Academy Awards, but it was not nominated.

== Premise ==
Marco, a 35-year-old chef, returns to his home in Italy to care for his ailing father. He meets Olivia, an aspiring Australian designer.

== Cast ==
- Flavio Parenti as Marco
- Maeve Dermody as Olivia
- Lino Guanciale as Claudio

== See also ==
- List of submissions to the 90th Academy Awards for Best Foreign Language Film
- List of Australian submissions for the Academy Award for Best Foreign Language Film
