= Bentley Dean =

Australian documentarian, director, producer, cinematographer, and filmmaker

Bentley Dean is an Australian documentarian, director, producer, cinematographer, and filmmaker.

== Career ==
Dean appeared in Race Around the World in 1997.

He is known for his collaborations with director Martin Butler.

Dean has earned critical acclaim for his works Contact (2010), First Footprints (2013), Tanna (2015), and A Sense of Self (2016) for Four Corners profiling Liz Jackson's experience of Parkinson's disease.

For Tanna, he received a nomination for Best Foreign Language Film at the 89th Academy Awards.

== Filmography ==
- 2021: Facing Monsters
- 2016: A Sense of Self (TV Movie documentary; with Martin Butler)
- 2015: Tanna (with Martin Butler)
- 2015: Call Me Dad (TV Movie documentary)
- 2013: First Footprints (TV Series documentary; with Martin Butler)
- 2010: Contact (Documentary; with Martin Butler)
- 2008: A Well-Founded Fear (Documentary)
- 2007: The Siege (Documentary)
- 2004: The President Versus David Hicks

== Accolades ==
Tanna has received critical acclaim. It has a score of 74% on Metacritic.

Award	Category	Recipient(s)	Result	Ref(s)
AACTA Awards (6th)	Best Film	Martin Butler, Bentley Dean and Carolyn Johnson	Nominated	
AACTA Awards (6th)	Best Direction	Martin Butler and Bentley Dean	Nominated	
AACTA Awards (6th)	Best Cinematography	Bentley Dean	Nominated	
Academy Award	Best Foreign Language Film	Martin Butler and Bentley Dean	Nominated	
African-American Film Critics Association	Best Foreign Film	Martin Butler and Bentley Dean	Won	
FCCA Awards	Best Film	Martin Butler, Bentley Dean and Carolyn Johnson	Nominated	
FCCA Awards	Best Cinematography	Bentley Dean	Nominated	
