= Shadow of the Cobra =

- Written by: Michael Lawrence; Scott Roberts
- Directed by: Mark Joffe
- Starring: Rachel Ward; Michael Woods; Art Malik; Helen Buday; Arthur Dignam
- Theme music composer: Chris Neal
- Country of origin: Australia
- Original language: English
- No. of episodes: 2

Production
- Producer: Ben Gannon

Original release
- Network: Seven Network
- Release: 19 July – 20 July 1989

Shadow of the Cobra is a 1989 television miniseries based on the book The Life and Crimes of Charles Sobhraj by Richard Neville and Julie Clarke.

== Cast ==
- Rachel Ward as Chris Royston
- Michael Woods
- Art Malik as Charles Sobhraj
- Helen Buday as Monique Leclerc
- Arthur Dignam as Gupta
- Lisa Hensley as Lizzy
