= The Survival of Kindness =

2022 Australian film

- Promotional poster
- Directed by: Rolf de Heer
- Written by: Rolf de Heer
- Produced by: Rolf de Heer; Julie Byrne
- Starring: Mwajemi Hussein; Deepthi Sharma; Darsan Sharma
- Cinematography: Maxx Corkindale
- Edited by: Isaac Coen Lindsay
- Music by: Anna Liebzeit
- Production companies: Triptych Pictures; Vertigo Productions
- Distributed by: Umbrella Entertainment
- Release dates: 23 October 2022 (Adelaide); 17 February 2023 (Berlinale)
- Running time: 96 minutes
- Country: Australia
- Language: English

The Survival of Kindness is a 2022 Australian dystopian drama film written, produced and directed by Rolf de Heer. It had its world premiere at Adelaide Film Festival on 23 October 2022, and its international premiere in competition at the 73rd Berlin International Film Festival on 17 February 2023, where it competed for Golden Bear and won the FIPRESCI Award for Best Film.

== Synopsis ==
The film has an experimental, minimalist style that almost completely eschews dialogue. It is set in a post-apocalyptic world apparently devastated by a virus, in which an overclass of white men, wearing protective gas masks, are the sole survivors.

The protagonist, referred to as "BlackWoman" in the credits (her name is not mentioned in the film) is captured, locked in a cage, and abandoned in the middle of a desert. She eventually breaks out and treks barefoot through the desert, a wasteland strewn with corpses, salvaging the shoes from one. She is careful to keep away from the damaged scavengers and drifters who roam the desert, but one steals her shoes at gunpoint. Eventually, she reaches a ghost town where she finds more suitable clothing at an abandoned museum. She continues her journey through a forest, where she witnesses a variety of disturbing sights such as lynched corpses and fleeing refugees harried by gunmen. She finds a gas mask and disguises herself as white, but when she reaches a town, she is accosted and found out by a gun-wielding thug. A pair of similarly disguised Asian teenagers (referred to as "BrownGirl" and "BrownBoy" in the credits) save her and take her to a rail museum, where they live. They agree to help her, and the three travel to an industrial zone that apparently serves as her captors' seat of power but are quickly captured and separated. BlackWoman is enslaved and forced to work in a scrapyard but manages to escape. Returning to the rail exhibits, she discovers that the boy and girl have also escaped but are critically injured. Leaving the boy, she leads the girl to a lake; after a brief attempt at conversation in mutually incomprehensible languages, the girl dies from her injuries. In despair, BlackWoman retraces the steps of her journey, discarding the clothes and supplies she found on the way. Finally, she reaches the cage, climbs back in, and lays down. In the last scene, there is a body on the floor of the cage and its door is not broken. This leaves open the possibly that her odyssey had been imagined, which would explain her apparent survival without sustenance.

== Cast ==
- Mwajemi Hussein (BlackWoman)
- Deepthi Sharma (BrownGirl)
- Darsan Sharma (BrownBoy)
- Gary Waddell
- Natasha Wanganeen

== Production ==
The film is produced by Julie Byrne and Rolf de Heer under the banner of Triptych Pictures and Vertigo Productions, and bankrolled by Screen Australia, Screen Tasmania, Adelaide Film Festival, and South Australian Film Corporation. Umbrella Entertainment is taking care of distribution in Australia. Elise Archer, Minister for the Arts, Tasmania, wrote on her website, "We have invested $90,000 in the film (The Survival of Kindness), through Screen Tasmania, which was filmed in both Tasmania and South Australia.

== Release ==
The Survival of Kindness had its world premiere at Adelaide Film Festival on 23 October 2022.

It had its international premiere in competition at the 73rd Berlin International Film Festival on 17 February 2023, where it competed for Golden Bear and won the FIPRESCI Award for Best Film.

The film was selected in country focus section 'Best of Contemporary Australian Cinema' at the 29th Kolkata International Film Festival and was screened on 6 December 2023.

The film will be screened on 1 November 2026 in the World Focus section of the 39th Tokyo International Film Festival.

== Reception ==
On the review aggregator Rotten Tomatoes website, the film has an approval rating of 85% based on 20 reviews, with an average rating of 7.2/10. On Metacritic, it has a weighted average score of 66 out of 100 based on 6 reviews, indicating "Generally Favorable Reviews".

David Rooney, reviewing for The Hollywood Reporter at Berlin Film Festival, praised the performance of Mwajemi Hussein, writing, "Hussein’s unflinching performance speaks volumes, mostly without words". Rooney found the film rather too lengthy: "there’s a grim inevitability to The Survival of Kindness that becomes wearing, making its 96 minutes feel longer." Calling it an outback gothic, he stated, "Some will find it immersive and others distancing; many will find it unrelentingly bleak, even infuriating in its ability to be simultaneously opaque and obvious." Peter Bradshaw of The Guardian rated the film with 3 stars out of 5 and wrote, "It is an elegant reverie about the violence and the stoicism beneath the surface of ordinary life." Wendy Ide for ScreenDaily wrote that the filmmaking is "striking, thought-provoking, although it rather runs out of steam and ideas in the third act." Pat Brown for Slant Magazine rated 2.5 out of 4 and praised Hussein as "magnetic as BlackWoman". Brown opined, "An epic adventure in the guise of an arthouse flick, The Survival of Kindness makes up in visual power and moral clarity what it lacks in subtext."

== Accolades ==
Award	Date	Category	Recipient	Result	Ref.
Berlin International Film Festival	25 February 2023	Golden Bear	The Survival of Kindness	Nominated	
Berlin International Film Festival	FIPRESCI Award	Best Film	The Survival of Kindness	Won	
Screen Music Awards	9 November 2023	Feature Film Score of the Year	Anna Liebzeit	Nominated	
AACTA Awards	10 February 2024	Best Indie Film	The Survival of Kindness	Nominated	
