= For Love Alone =

1986 Australian film

- VHS cover
- Directed by: Stephen Wallace
- Written by: Stephen Wallace
- Based on: novel by Christina Stead
- Produced by: Margaret Fink; David Thomas
- Starring: Helen Buday; Sam Neill; Hugo Weaving
- Cinematography: Alun Bollinger
- Edited by: Henry Dangar
- Music by: Nathan Waks
- Production company: Western Film Productions
- Distributed by: Greater Union
- Release date: 22 May 1986
- Running time: 102 minutes
- Country: Australia
- Language: English
- Budget: AU$3.8 million
- Box office: AU$193,000 (Australia)

For Love Alone is a 1986 Australian film directed by Stephen Wallace, and starring Helen Buday, Hugo Weaving and Sam Neill. The screenplay was written by Wallace, based on the 1945 novel of the same name by Christina Stead. It marked Naomi Watts' film debut. The film was entered into the 37th Berlin International Film Festival.

== Plot ==
In the 1930s, Teresa (Buday) is a naive young woman dealing with the oppressive attitudes of society and her father's austere ways. She has a fling with university Latin professor Jonathan Crow (Weaving). It takes her some time to realize that he does not desire a serious relationship. Teresa then starts dating liberal-minded banker James Quick (Neill). Once she's settled down with Quick, the idealistic Teresa becomes enamored with another intellectual, poet Harry (Williams). Quick encourages the affair, hoping that Teresa will come to realize that there's more to true love than mere sexual impulsivity.

== Cast ==
Actor	Role
Helen Buday	Teresa
Sam Neill	James Quick
Hugo Weaving	Jonathan Crow
Huw Williams	Harry
Hugh Keays-Byrne	Andrew
Odile Le Clezio	Kitty
Naomi Watts	Leo's girlfriend
Nicholas Opolski	
Denise Roberts	Mrs Ashley

== Production ==
The film was a pet project for producer Margaret Fink who took six years to raise finance. The bulk of the money came from a pre-sale to Greater Union and from UA. Fink had been impressed by Stir and asked Stephen Wallace to direct.

Fay Weldon wrote some early drafts but neither Fink or Wallace were happy with them so Wallace did the adaptation himself. Wallace says it took him three and a half years to write the script.

Peter Strauss was originally cast to play James Quick but was replaced by Sam Neill. Geneviève Picot was tentatively cast in the lead role but it took two years to raise the money by which time it was felt she was too old so she was replaced by Helen Buday, who had only made one film previously.

Most of the movie was shot in Sydney starting in March 1985 with a four-day shoot at Oxford University.

== Reception ==
The movie received poor reviews. Stephen Wallace says he was particularly shocked by the reviews from feminists and women's magazines. "They attacked it so viciously. So I guess it wasn't a totally competent film. I know it was a bit slow and clumsy and I have to accept that."

For Love Alone grossed $193,000 at the box office in Australia which was considered a disappointment. Stephen Wallace regrets his treatment of the subject matter was not bolder.

== See also ==
- Cinema of Australia
