= Arrows of the Thunder Dragon =

2013 film

- Directed by: Greg Sneddon
- Written by: Greg Sneddon
- Produced by: Greg Sneddon; Tshering Dorji
- Starring: Kandu
- Release dates: 16 November 2013 (Kolkata International Film Festival); 29 April 2015
- Running time: 89 minutes
- Country: Australia
- Language: Dzongkha

Arrows of the Thunder Dragon is a 2013 Australian drama film directed by Greg Sneddon. The film was selected as the Australian entry for Best Foreign Language Film at the 88th Academy Awards but was not nominated. It was film in Bhutan.

== Cast ==
- Kandu as Sangay
- Tshering Zam as Jamyang

== See also ==
- List of submissions to the 88th Academy Awards for Best Foreign Language Film
- List of Australian submissions for the Academy Award for Best Foreign Language Film
