= Tail of a Tiger =

- Directed by: Rolf de Heer
- Written by: Rolf de Heer
- Based on: original work by Peter Hubbard
- Produced by: Grahame Jennings; James M. Vernon
- Starring: Grant Navin
- Cinematography: Richard Michalak
- Edited by: Suresh Ayyar
- Music by: Graham Tardif
- Production company: Producer's Circle Production
- Distributed by: Roadshow Entertainment; Umbrella Entertainment
- Release date: 2 October 1984
- Running time: 80 minutes
- Country: Australia
- Language: English
- Box office: A$3,566 (Australia)

Tail of a Tiger is a 1984 Australian film directed by Rolf de Heer in his directorial debut and starring Grant Navin.

== Plot ==
Schoolboy Orville Ryan has a keen interest in model planes and flying, but is ostracised by a model-plane circle run by a gang of his peers headed by a bully called Spike, who smashes his model Tiger Moth.

He then stumbles upon a deserted factory complex where he finds a genuine full size Tiger Moth, in need of restoration. He meets the plane's owner, Harry, who at first resists Orville's attempts to connect. Eventually though, the pair embark on a mission to make the plane fly once more.

== Cast ==
- Grant Navin as Orville
- Gordon Poole as Harry
- Caz Lederman as Lydia
- Gayle Kennedy as Beryl
- Peter Feeley as Spike
- Dylan Lyle as Rabbit
- Basil Clarke as Jacko

== Production ==
Tail of a Tiger was filmed in Sydney, Australia. It was the first feature film for most of the crew, including writer/director Rolf de Heer.

== Accolades ==
Year	Award	Result
1997	Singapore International Film Festival	Selected
1991	Internationales Essener Kinderfilmfestival im Ruhrgebiet	Selected
1985	Chicago International Festival of Children's Films	Selected
