= Dr Plonk =

Dr. Plonk
- Theatrical film poster
- Directed by: Rolf de Heer
- Written by: Rolf de Heer
- Produced by: Rolf de Heer; Julie Ryan
- Starring: Nigel Martin
- Cinematography: Judd Overton
- Edited by: Tania Nehme
- Music by: Graham Tardif
- Production companies: Australian Film Finance Corporation; Vertigo Productions
- Distributed by: Palace Films (Australia); Fandango
- Release dates: 5 April 2007 (Adelaide Film Festival); 30 August 2007 (Australia)
- Running time: 83 minutes
- Country: Australia
- Language: English

Dr Plonk, also titled Dr Plonk: The brilliant Dr Plonk, is a 2007 Australian black and white silent sci-fi / comedy film written and directed by Rolf de Heer. It premiered in Australia at the 2007 Adelaide Film Festival on 4 March 2007, with live accompaniment by the Stiletto Sisters. The film was released in cinemas in Australia on 30 August 2007. Its score was composed by Graham Tardif and performed by the Stiletto sisters. It is also notable for a cameo appearance by the South Australian Premier, Mike Rann, playing the 2007 Prime Minister.

== Plot ==
The story focuses on Dr Plonk, a scientist and inventor who, in 1907, determines that the world will end in 101 years. However, he is ridiculed for his beliefs and so invents a time machine in order to collect evidence from the future to prove his case. But each visit he makes to 2007 only causes him more problems, and he eventually becomes a wanted man.

One scene satirises cliffhanger old movie serials where "fake natives" threaten the hero, by having Indigenous members of the cast "overact in silly grass skirts and fuzzy-wuzzy wigs".

== Cast ==
- Nigel Lunghi as Dr Plonk
- Magda Szubanski as Mrs Plonk
- Paul Blackwell as Dr Plonk's assistant, Paulus
- Reg the dog as Tiberius the dog
- Guest appearances by many "familiar faces", including Mike Rann, playing the 2007 Prime Minister
- Cast members from Ten Canoes

== Production ==
De Heer was inspired to make the film after discovering old raw film stock, which prompted him to make a silent film. He directed and co-produced the film, with Julie Ryan and Vertigo Productions.

Sue Murray, Domenico Procacci, and Bryce Menzies were executive producers. Judd Overton was cinematographer. Tania Nehme edited the film, while Beverley Freeman was responsible for production design. Adelaide Film Festival assisted with funding.

De Heer had originally planned to use the Wurlitzer organ as accompaniment at the film's world premiere at the Adelaide Film Festival, and record the music as well as the sounds in the cinema, such as the audience clapping, to create the score. However, the organ did not work with the film, so they asked the Stiletto Sisters, adding a piano to their line-up of Hope Csutoros on violin, Judy Gunson on piano accordion, and Jo To on double bass, to perform instead. Graham Tardif composed the score to suit the performers and their vocals. The score was described by Richard Kuipers in Variety magazine as a "pastiche of jigs, hillbilly pickings and sea-shanty melodies".

The film is 83 minutes long, and also titled Dr Plonk: The brilliant Dr Plonk.

== Release ==
Dr Plonk premiered in Australia as the closing film at the 2007 Adelaide Film Festival on 4 March 2007, with Tardif's score played live by the Stiletto Sisters.

It was selected for screening at Toronto, Munich, Goteborg and Rome Film Festivals, as well as the Sitges Film Festival in Spain. A special screening of the film for schoolchildren was arranged at the 2007 Brisbane International Film Festival, and was screened at the launch of Australia's National Film and Sound Archive's new cinema, Arc, in the same month.

The film was distributed in Australia by Palace Films and internationally by Fandango. Its public cinema release in Australia was on 30 August 2007.

== Reception ==
=== Box office ===
Dr. Plonk grossed $83,450 at the box office in Australia.

=== Critical response ===
Dr Plonk scored 68% on the review aggregator site Rotten Tomatoes, but the score was only based on two reviews.

Richard Kuipers in Variety magazine described the film as "a tribute to silent filmmaking and a sly, Jacques Tati-like satire of modern ways", although "not an unqualified success", with the middle section slowing down the laughs. He commented on its references to filmmakers Mack Sennett and Hal Roach, and its use of gags similar to Buster Keaton and the Keystone Cops. He also praised the technical quality of the film as well as the performances, in particular that of Magda Szubanski.

Luke Buckmaster, writing on In Film Australia, called it "a feat of inspired lunacy... carr[ying] the inimitable charm of a true rarity...", concluding "This irresistibly insane excursion to cinematic la-la land offers a mishmash of old and new delights, and also happens to be one of the most consistently enjoyable time travel movies out there".

Michael Adams, writing for SBS Television's The Movie Show, gave the film three stars out of five, writing "De Heer could've done much more with the story to justify feature length".

Urban Cinefile critic Louise Keller gave a positive review: "Beyond its novelty value, Dr Plonk is fresh and funny, wacky and outlandish as it combines slapstick, situation comedy and an audacious premise".

Dr Plonk was listed as no. 169 on a list of "The Best and Worst Australian Films – The Critics View", published in 2023 on film buff Peter Morrow's website Ozflicks. The order was based on a survey of 78 Australian and international critics and film websites, which included more than 8,000 ratings of over 1,400 Australian films.

=== Accolades ===
Judd Overton, a recent graduate of the Australian Film, Television and Radio School, won an award from the Australian Cinematographers Society.

Graham Tardif was nominated for a FCCA Award for Best Music Score.

== See also ==
- Cinema of Australia
- South Australian Film Corporation
