= The Quiet Room (1996 film) =

1996 film

- Film poster
- Directed by: Rolf de Heer
- Written by: Rolf de Heer
- Produced by: Rolf de Heer
- Starring: Celine O'Leary
- Cinematography: Tony Clark
- Edited by: Tania Nehme
- Distributed by: 20th Century Fox
- Release date: 14 March 1996
- Running time: 93 minutes
- Countries: Australia; Italy; France
- Language: English

The Quiet Room is a 1996 Australian-Italian-French drama film directed by Rolf de Heer. It competed for the Palme d'Or at the 1996 Cannes Film Festival.

== Plot ==
The Quiet Room centres on an unnamed little girl and how she deals with her parents' crumbling marriage. The film focuses entirely on her point of view and although she does not speak for most of the film, we constantly hear her thoughts as a voice-over. She has chosen to become mute as a way to protest her parents' bickering. They are unable to dissuade her, not by threats or pleading, and she cannot relent without conceding her modicum of power. She expresses her frustration by mindless scribbling on pieces of paper, which she scrunches up and throws away.

The girl learns other ways to communicate with her parents. Through her drawings, she expresses her desire of owning a dog and how she believes they will be happier as a family if they lived in the country instead of in their tiny apartment in the city. During flashbacks, we see when her parents were happy and still in love. The girl, perhaps intentionally as a way to cope, confuses tenses (thinking "I'm little now..." instead of "when I was little..."). But even then, she catches glimpses of her parents' dysfunctional relationship, such as when her father spits in her mother's face after she yells at him. Her parents don't notice she is in the room but the memory leaves a long-lasting impression on her. In the present, her anxiety manifests itself through waking nightmares where she imagines wild animals escaping from the zoo and coming to get her. At the end of the film, she hides herself in her parents' wardrobe to escape their bickering. After a while, she falls asleep in an uncomfortable position. When she wakes up, she is too stiff to move. Unable to escape on her own, the little girl finally breaks down and calls out for help and her parents, who had thought she ran away, rush to her aid.

The girl gives her parents one last drawing. In it, she successfully conveys her feelings of being overwhelmed by her parents' constant fighting and how she feels less motivated to speak the more she hears them argue. As she hands it to them, she says, "This is how I feel. That's how you make me feel." Finally hearing their daughter for the first time and realizing the effect their behaviour has on hers, her parents announce that they're going to move to the country. When they also promise her a dog, she becomes so ecstatic that she starts singing incessantly and dancing around her room.

== Cast ==
- Celine O'Leary as Mother
- Paul Blackwell as Father
- Chloe Ferguson as Girl Age 7
- Phoebe Ferguson as Girl Age 3

Chloe and Phoebe Ferguson also appear in de Heer's 1996 film Alien Visitor

- Kate Greetham as Kate, the Babysitter
- Todd Telford as Workman
- Peter Ferris as Carpet Cleaner
- Peter Green as Carpet Cleaner
- Trudy Talbot as Well Dressed Woman (uncredited)

== Box office ==
The Quiet Room grossed $57,245 at the box office in Australia.

== Reception ==
On review aggregator website Rotten Tomatoes, the film holds an approval rating of 80% based on 5 reviews, with an average rating of 6.7/10.
