= Ulli Birvé =

Australian actress

- Born: c.1965
- Occupation: Actress

Ulli Birvé is an Australian actress. She starred as She in Epsilon and as Helen Virtue in Something in the Air. On stage she played the bride Meg Bacon in the first run of Secret Bridesmaids' Business in Melbourne and Sydney, appeared as Marc in Jungfrau in 1997. and toured as Jane in Speaking in Tongues in 2003.
