= Martin Butler (director) =

Australian film director & producer

Martin Butler (born 1952) is an Australian film and television producer, director, and screenwriter. He is best known the 2015 award-winning film Tanna, and usually collaborates with filmmaker Bentley Dean and editor Tania Nehme.

== Early life and education ==
Martin Butler was born in England in 1952.

He studied politics and economics at Oxford University, and afterwards worked for the manager of The Who. He migrated to Australia in 1981.

== Career ==
Butler has spent much of his career as a long-form current affairs television producer. He spent six years working on ABC Television's Four Corners, where he directed and produced several episodes, and served for 10 years as supervising or associate producer on Foreign Correspondent. Moving to SBS Television, he became supervising producer for Dateline.

First Footprints is a four-part television series directed by Butler and Bentley Dean and narrated by Ernie Dingo, which premiered on 14 July 2013 on ABC Television. The series won the Walkley Documentary Award in 2013.

In 2009, he co-directed Contact with Bentley Dean. The film tells the story of 20 Martu people who in 1964 became the last people in the Great Sandy Desert to have come into contact with Europeans. The film won many awards.

Other films, made in collaboration with Bentley Dean, include Tanna (director, producer, and writer) (2015), and A Sense of Self (director, producer) (2016).

For Tanna, he received a nomination for Best Foreign Language Film at 89th Academy Awards.

== Personal life ==
His long term partner was the late journalist, television presenter and barrister Liz Jackson, with whom he had two children including Rose Jackson.

== Accolades ==
- 2013: Winner, Walkley Documentary Award in the Walkley Awards, for First Footprints
- 2017: Winner, Walkley Documentary Award, for A Sense of Self; awarded to Liz Jackson, Martin Butler, Bentley Dean, and editor Tania Nehme

Award	Category	Recipient(s)	Result	Ref(s)
AACTA Awards	Best Film	Martin Butler, Bentley Dean and Carolyn Johnson	Nominated	
AACTA Awards	Best Direction	Martin Butler and Bentley Dean	Nominated	
AACTA Awards	Best Cinematography	Bentley Dean	Nominated	
AACTA Awards	Best Original Music Score	Antony Partos	Won	
AACTA Awards	Best Sound	James Ashton, Emma Bortignon and Martin Butler	Nominated	
Academy Awards	Best Foreign Language Film	Martin Butler and Bentley Dean	Nominated	
African-American Film Critics Association	Best Foreign Film	Tanna	Won	
