= Marzieh Vafamehr =

Iranian actress

- مرضیه وفامهر
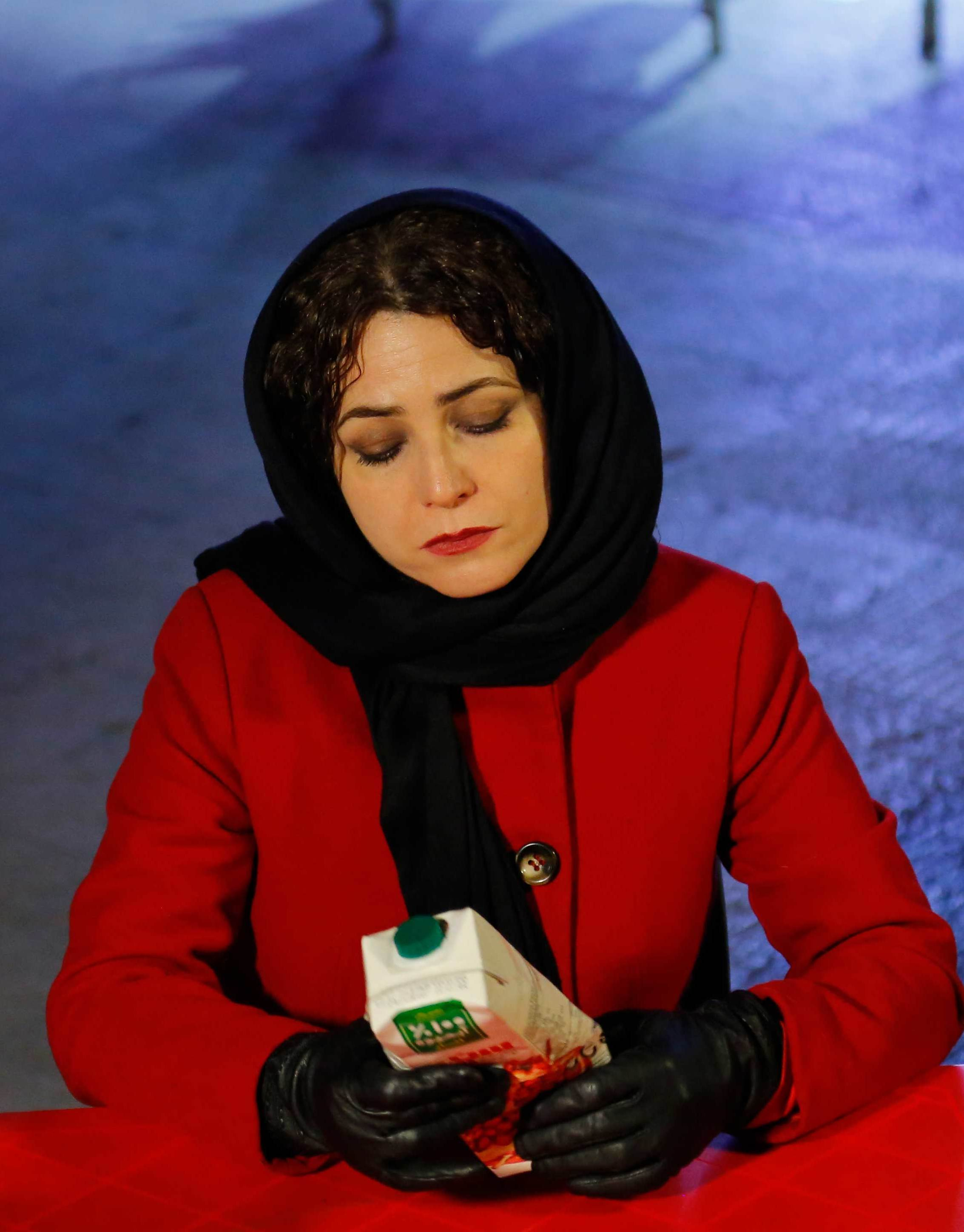
- Marzieh Vafamehr in Belly's Suction short film
- Occupations: Actress and Filmmaker, social, women's rights activist

Marzieh Vafamehr (Persian: مرضیه وفامهر) is an Iranian independent filmmaker, actress, social and women's rights activist living in Tehran. She has been active in the One Million Signatures campaign in Iran for more than twenty years.

== Biography ==
Marzieh Vafamehr is married to film director and screenwriter Nasser Taghvai. She was arrested on 29 June 2011, reportedly due to her role in Granaz Moussavi's 2009 Iranian-Australian film My Tehran for Sale that is critical of her native Iran.

She was released on 24 October 2011, after posting unspecified bail. It was reported that she was sentenced to 90 lashes and a year in prison.

On 27 October 2011, Amnesty International reported that an Iranian appeals court had reduced Vafamehr's prison sentence to three months and overturned the flogging sentence.

Vafamehr was released after 118 days from Qarchak Prison, but banned from making or acting in films and forbidden to leave Iran.

She is the first Iranian woman who acted in cinema without the hijab after the Iranian revolution and the first to publish a picture of herself kissing Nasser Taghvai in Nowruz 2013. She was one of the founding members of the Women's Citizenship Center in 2013.

== Filmography ==
=== Actress ===
- Gaze
- Belly's Suction by Pourya Moradi
- The Cancer Period by Hossein Shahabi
- My Tehran for Sale by Granaz Moussavi
- The Bitter Tea by Nasser Taghvai
- Zangi and Roomi by Nasser Taghvai
- Wind, Ten Years Old by Marzieh Vafamehr
- Barefoot In Heaven
- play- written by Alireza Hanifi
- Galilei –play-written by Bertolt Brecht
- Rose Tattoo –play-written by Tennessee Williams
- Wiggily-play- in Connecticut written by J.D. Salinger
- and Good Bye-play- written by Athol Fugard
- e Choobineh –play-written by Siamak Taghipour
- in Paradise a feature directed by Bahram Tavakolli

=== Director ===
- Nabat
- Wind, ten years old
- Crossed Out
- Doll House
- Station
