= Dance Me to My Song =

1998 film

- Film poster
- Directed by: Rolf de Heer
- Written by: Rolf de Heer; Heather Rose; Frederick Stahl
- Produced by: Rolf de Heer
- Starring: Heather Rose; Joey Kennedy
- Cinematography: Tony Clark
- Edited by: Tania Nehme
- Music by: Graham Tardif
- Release date: 22 October 1998
- Running time: 101 minutes
- Country: Australia
- Language: English

Dance Me to My Song is a 1998 Australian drama film directed by Rolf de Heer. The story follows a woman with cerebral palsy who is abused by her professional carer (played by Joey Kennedy) but later seduces the carer's boyfriend (played by John Brumpton). After the film was screened at the Cannes Film Festival, A documentary was made entitled Heather Rose Goes to Cannes that followed the journey of the actress playing Julia, Heather Rose, from living alone in Adelaide to attending the festival in France.

== Synopsis ==
The plot centres on Julia, who is severely disabled by cerebral palsy, who is abused by her carer Madelaine. Julia seduces Madelaine's boyfriend, Eddie.

== Cast ==
- Heather Rose as Julia
- Joey Kennedy as Madelaine
- John Brumpton as Eddie
- Danny Cowles as Joe
- Catherine Fitzgerald as Dogface
- Susie Fraser as Social Worker
- Carmel Johnson as Temporary Carer
- Phil MacPherson as Trev
- Rena Owen as Rix

== Production ==
The film was conceived by Heather Rose, who had cerebral palsy in real life and played the lead role herself. She intended the film to be "hot and sexy... not just another soppy disability film".

Rose died in 2002.

== Release ==
The film was entered into the 1998 Cannes Film Festival.

== Documentary ==
A documentary was made entitled Heather Rose Goes to Cannes that followed Rose's journey from living alone in Adelaide to attending the festival with her film in competition. The film was directed by Christopher Corin and produced by Julie Ryan. The film was executive produced by Mike Piper of Piper Films, and screened on SBS Television.

== Reception ==
The film grossed $175,138 at the box office in Australia.

Roger Ebert described the film as one where "the human will and spirit overwhelm you". David Stratton describes the film as "a warm, positive, affirmation of life". An article in Australian Feminist Studies discusses the film in the genre of women's films.
