= Daybill =

A daybill is one variety of Australian film poster issued to cinemas at the time of a film's release. A daybill measures approximately 13 by 30 inches (330 by 760 mm), however during World War II some daybills measured 10 by 30 inches (250 by 760 mm) because it allowed an additional daybill to fit onto the sheet of paper.

Daybills were folded twice and sold to cinemas for 5 to 10 cents.

Until the 1970s, most daybills were printed as lithographs. In the 1960s some posters began copying American printing techniques to achieve a 'gloss' finish that suited the photographic images that were becoming prevalent in poster design. Today, daybills are printed on thick glossy paper and are much more durable.

Daybills are sought after by collectors for their rarity and unique artwork. Some of the more famous daybills include:

- Halloween (John Carpenter, 1978). Features a unique image of villain Michael Myers. Australia was the only country to depict Myers on the poster.
- The Empire Strikes Back (George Lucas, 1980). Features artwork developed in Japan, but considered superior among many collectors.
