= Ruth Borgobello =

Australian-Italian film director

- Occupations: Film director Screenwriter
- Years active: 2003–present

Ruth Borgobello is an Australian-Italian film director and screenwriter. Her 2016 film The Space Between, starring Flavio Parenti and Maeve Dermody, was selected as the Australian entry for the Best Foreign Language Film at the 90th Academy Awards.

== Selected filmography ==
- The Space Between (2016)
