= Epsilon (film) =

1995 Australian-Italian science fiction film by Rolf de Heer

Epsilon (also known as Alien Visitor)
- Directed by: Rolf de Heer
- Written by: Rolf de Heer
- Produced by: Domenico Procacci; Rolf de Heer
- Starring: Ulli Birve; Syd Brisbane
- Cinematography: Tony Clark
- Edited by: Tania Nehme
- Music by: Graham Tardif
- Distributed by: Roadshow (AU); Miramax (US, UK)
- Release date: 23 April 1997 (Australia)
- Running time: 88 minutes (1995 version); 92 minutes (1997 version)
- Countries: Australia, Italy
- Language: English
- Box office: A$2,373 (Australia)

Epsilon (also titled Alien Visitor) is a 1995 Australian-Italian science fiction film that was directed by Rolf de Heer. It features Ulli Birve and Syd Brisbane (and Alethea McGrath, but in the 1997 expanded version only). The extended version of the film runs for 92 minutes and was distributed by Miramax in 1997.

== Cast ==
- Ulli Birvé as She
- Syd Brisbane as The Man
- Alethea McGrath as Grandmother
- Chloe Ferguson as Child
- Phoebe Ferguson as Child

== Plot ==
An old woman tells two little girls a story around a campfire. A young female from the planet Epsilon is teleported to Earth by mistake. She arrives naked in a desert of the Australian Outback, but is found by a surveyor who gives her some clothes. When she finds out she is on Earth, she is upset and informs the surveyor that other alien races consider humans to be failures that suffer from carelessness and greed and their habit of creating pollution is especially frowned upon. He at first thinks she is crazy, but she demonstrates the ability to transport herself and the surveyor instantly to any location and manipulate time. She takes him on a journey around the world, showing him the damage people have done to the environment. After several harsh lessons, like when she locates and cuts down his favorite tree, he begins to see her point of view.

Eventually, the two fall in love and she decides to stay on Earth. However, her people locate her and abruptly teleport her back to Epsilon, leaving her empty pile of clothes behind. Though saddened, he decides to honor her by working to stop pollution, starting by leaving his truck behind and walking back to civilization because of the air pollution it creates.

The old woman concludes her tale by saying the surveyor succeeded. Thanks to his efforts, air pollution was eliminated and people are able to see the stars at night.

== Production ==
De Heer came up with the idea for the film while driving to dinner at a friend's house. Filming took over eight months.

== See also ==
- Cinema of Australia
