= Pinnacle Films =

Film distributor and film studios

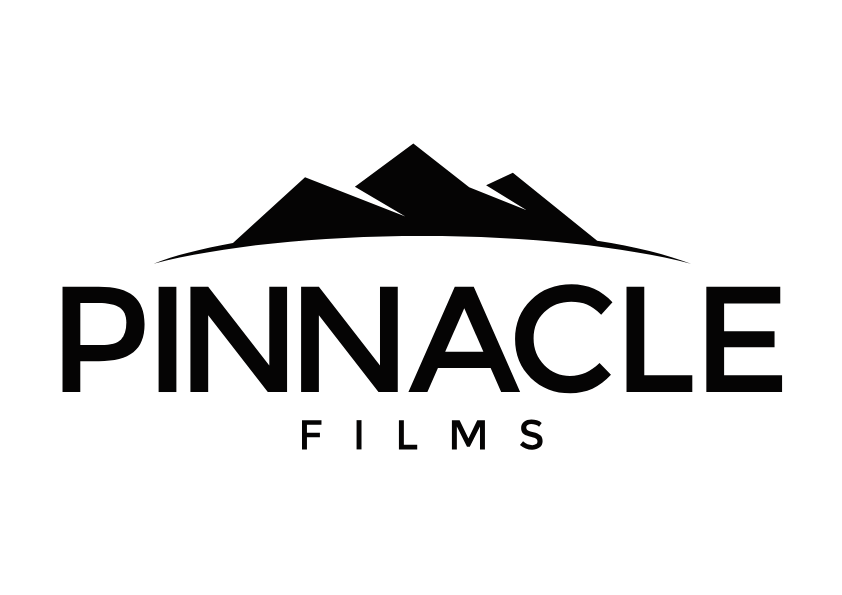
- Pinnacle Films Logo: 2024 - Present
- Industry: Entertainment
- Founded: 2008
- Founder: Sherard Kingston
- Headquarters: Gold Coast, Queensland, Australia
- Products: Cinema, Digital, DVD, Blu-ray, 4K UHD
- Website: https://pinnaclefilms.com.au

Pinnacle Films is a film distribution company and film studios, located in Helensvale, Gold Coast, Australia.

Pinnacle Films manages theatrical, digital and physical releases of both Australian and international films within Australia, New Zealand and the South Pacific Islands.

Pinnacle Studios is Pinnacle Films’ independent production facility. Feature film and television productions housed at the studios include Monarch: Legacy of Monsters, Mortal Kombat II, The Portable Door and Young Rock, plus numerous independent films.

== History ==
Pinnacle Films was founded in 2008 by Sherard Kingston, as a division of All Interactive Distribution: one of Australia’s largest distributors of physical format media. Pinnacle Films began as an independent distributor acquiring both international and Australian feature films.

In 2021, Pinnacle Films opened Pinnacle Studios, consisting of three sound stages and production offices, as an answer to mounting demand for production facilities on the Gold Coast.

In 2026, Pinnacle Studios will expand its offering with the opening of two purpose-built sound stages spanning more than 4,365m² (46,985 sq ft), alongside a four-level production office complex exceeding 3,319m² (35,725 sq ft). The facility will also feature dedicated green rooms, dressing rooms, a private 36-seat DCI-compliant screening room, secure underground parking, and a premium private event space with rooftop terrace available for hire.

== Distribution ==
An "all rights" licensor, Pinnacle Films distribution includes theatrical, digital (TVOD / SVOD), and physical format media (DVD / Blu-ray / 4K UHD)

In 2023, Pinnacle Films distributed The Secret Kingdom, an Australian family-adventure film, directed by Matt Drummond. The film screened in over 90 cinemas across Australia and the South Pacific.

=== Notable titles distributed by Pinnacle Films include ===
- Dallas Buyers Club (2013)
- Dark Skies (2013)
- Dear White People (2014)
- Dinosaur Island (2014)
- Drive (2011)
- Jobs (2013)
- Larry Crowne (2011)
- Moon Rock for Monday (2021)
- My Pet Dinosaur (2017)
- Postman Pat: The Movie (2014)
- Predestination (2014)
- Return to Nim's Island (2013)
- Road Train (2010)
- The Combination (2009)
- The Combination: Redemption (2019)
- The Green Inferno (2013)
- The Nowhere Inn (2021)
- The Secret Kingdom (2023)
- The Day the Earth Blew Up: A Looney Tunes Movie (2025)
- Coyote vs. Acme (2026)

== Pinnacle Studios ==
Pinnacle Studios is a film and television production facility. Alongside Village Roadshow Studios, the studio constitutes a major filming location in Queensland. The studio currently offers two production spaces, with the plan to open two additional sound stages by the end of 2026.

The studio also provides action design and virtual production services for the film, gaming, and entertainment industries.

=== Productions using Pinnacle Studios ===
- Voltron (2027)
- Posthumous (2026)
- Balls Up (2026)
- Spa Weekend (2026)
- The Mark (2026)
- Dustfall (2026)
- Mortal Kombat II (2026)
- Monarch: Legacy of Monsters (2025)
- Black Site (2022)
- Furiosa: A Mad Max Saga (2024)
- Nautilus (Upcoming)
- Occupation: Rainfall (2021)
- Rock Island Mysteries (2023)
- The Portable Door (2023)
- The Possessed (2021)
- Ticket to Paradise (2022)
- Young Rock (2022)
- Wizards! (Upcoming)
