= Alexandra's Project =

- Theatrical film poster
- Directed by: Rolf de Heer
- Written by: Rolf de Heer
- Produced by: Rolf de Heer; Domenico Procacci; Julie Ryan
- Starring: Gary Sweet; Helen Buday
- Cinematography: Ian Jones
- Edited by: Tania Nehme
- Music by: Graham Tardif
- Production companies: Vertigo Productions Pty. Ltd. The Australian Film Commission; Fandango Australia; Hendon Studios; Palace Films; The South Australian Film Corporation
- Distributed by: Palace Films; 20th Century Fox Home Entertainment
- Release date: 8 May 2003 (Australia)
- Running time: 103 minutes
- Country: Australia
- Language: English
- Box office: A$844,494 (Australia)

Alexandra's Project is a 2003 Australian drama thriller film written and directed by Rolf de Heer and starring Gary Sweet and Helen Buday.

== Plot ==
Upon returning home from work on his birthday, Steve, a middle class husband and father of two, finds the house dark and his family not home. He notices a chair, his television set, and a video tape obviously set out for his viewing. He turns the TV and VCR on, and begins to watch a tape made for him by his wife, Alexandra. The first clip shows his wife and children wishing him a happy birthday, but after the kids leave the room, Alexandra begins a striptease, and it appears to be nothing more than a birthday gift. As it progresses, however, it becomes clear that the tape is designed to humiliate and torture Steve for marital problems that Alexandra has been stewing about for years. As part of her 'show', Alexandra feigns breast cancer, has sex with their neighbour, and tells Steve that neither she nor their two children are ever coming home.

== Cast ==
- Gary Sweet as Steve
- Helen Buday as Alexandra
- Bogdan Koca as Bill
- Jack Christie as Sam
- Samantha Knigge as Emma
- Eileen Darley as Christine
- Geoff Revell as Rodney
- Philip Spruce as Taxi Driver
- Nathan O'Keefe as Man at Door
- Peter Greena as Chairman
- Martha Lott as Female Worker
- Cindy Elliott as Female Worker
- Gemma Falk as Female Worker
- Nicole Daniel as Female Worker
- Duncan Graham as Male Worker
- Michael Ienna as Male Worker

== Production ==
De Heer originally wanted to make the film so he could use a single location and use up various fragments of ideas he had accumulated.

== Release ==
The film's world premiere was 14 February 2003 as part of the Berlin International Film Festival and was released regularly as Cinema release on 8 May 2003 in Australia.

== Reception ==
=== Box office ===
Alexandra's Project took $844,494 at the box office in Australia.

=== Critical reception ===
On Rotten Tomatoes the film has rating of 53% based on 19 reviews, with an average 5.56/10 rating. The Cultural Post gave it three out of five stars.

=== Accolades ===
Award	Category	Subject	Result
AACTA Awards (2003 AFI Awards)	Best Film	Rolf de Heer	Nominated
AACTA Awards (2003 AFI Awards)	Best Film	Domenico Procacci	Nominated
AACTA Awards (2003 AFI Awards)	Best Film	Julie Ryan	Nominated
AACTA Awards (2003 AFI Awards)	Best Actress	Helen Buday	Nominated
AACTA Awards (2003 AFI Awards)	Best Editing	Tania Nehme	Nominated
AACTA Awards (2003 AFI Awards)	Best Original Music Score	Graham Tardif	Nominated
AACTA Awards (2003 AFI Awards)	Best Sound	James Currie	Nominated
AACTA Awards (2003 AFI Awards)	Best Sound	Rory McGregor	Nominated
AACTA Awards (2003 AFI Awards)	Best Sound	Nada Mikas	Nominated
AACTA Awards (2003 AFI Awards)	Best Sound	Andrew Plain	Nominated
Berlin International Film Festival	Golden Bear	Rolf de Heer	Nominated
Chicago International Film Festival	Gold Hugo for Best Feature	Rolf de Heer	Nominated
FCCA Awards	Best Director	Rolf de Heer	Nominated
FCCA Awards	Best Original Screenplay	Rolf de Heer	Won
FCCA Awards	Best Film	Rolf de Heer	Nominated
FCCA Awards	Best Film	Domenico Procacci	Nominated
FCCA Awards	Best Film	Julie Ryan	Nominated
FCCA Awards	Best Actor - Male	Gary Sweet	Nominated
FCCA Awards	Best Actor - Female	Helen Buday	Nominated
FCCA Awards	Best Supporting Actor - Male	Bogdan Koca	Nominated
FCCA Awards	Best Editing	Tania Nehme	Nominated
Golden Trailer Awards	Best Foreign Dramatic Trailer		Nominated
Inside Film Awards	Best Direction	Rolf de Heer	Nominated
Inside Film Awards	Best Actress	Helen Buday	Nominated
Inside Film Awards	Best Sound	James Currie	Nominated
Inside Film Awards	Best Sound	Nada Mikas	Nominated
Inside Film Awards	Best Sound	Andrew Plain	Nominated
Montreal World Film Festival	Golden Zenith for Best Film from Oceania	Rolf de Heer	Won
Valladolid International Film Festival	Golden Spike	Rolf de Heer	Nominated
Valladolid International Film Festival	Best Actress	Helen Buday	Won

== Home media ==
Alexandra's Project was released by Fandango Australia / Palace Films as a DVD in 2003.

== See also ==
- Cinema of Australia
- South Australian Film Corporation
