= Liz Jackson =

Australian journalist and barrister (1951–2018)

- Born: 1951
- Died: 27 June 2018 (aged 67); Greece
- Occupations: Journalist, television presenter, barrister
- Known for: Four Corners as correspondent, Media Watch as hostess
- Family: Rose Jackson (daughter)
- Awards: 5× Walkley Awards, 3× Logie Awards

Liz Jackson (1951 – 27 June 2018) was an Australian journalist, TV presenter and barrister noted for her work on the Four Corners and Media Watch television programs. She received nine Walkley Awards for excellence in journalism.

== Career ==
Jackson grew up in Melbourne, Victoria, and commenced work with the Australian Broadcasting Corporation (ABC) in 1986. Prior to her career with the ABC, Jackson also worked in a community legal centre in Australia and practised law in London as a barrister at Gray's Inn. She returned to Australia and worked for the New South Wales Premier's Department, in the Women's Coordination Unit, dealing with laws to protect women from violence.

After joining Four Corners as an investigative reporter in 1994, Jackson was awarded Walkley Awards, Australia's awards for journalism, on five occasions for her work on the following:

- The situation in Somalia (1993);
- The suicide of Aboriginal activist Rob Riley;
- "Fixing Cricket", a report about cricket match-fixing (2000);
- "Go to jail", regarding the Northern Territory's mandatory sentencing laws (2000); and,
- "Putting the Children at Risk", an investigation into the New South Wales Government Department of Community Services (2002).

Jackson received three Logie Awards for "Fixing Cricket" and stories related to the Blackhawk disaster and HIV transmission from a doctor's surgery.

At the start of 2005, Jackson hosted the media-criticism program Media Watch, before stepping down in December 2005 and returning to Four Corners.

== Personal life ==
She had a family with her long-term partner Martin Butler award winning film and television producer, director, and screenwriter; including their daughter Rose Jackson.

In November 2016, Jackson revealed she had been diagnosed with Parkinson's disease in 2014, with the release of a documentary called "A Sense of Self" broadcast as an episode of Four Corners.

Jackson died in her sleep while on holiday in Greece on 27 June 2018 at the age of 67.

Her daughter Rose is a Labor member of the New South Wales Legislative Council and a minister in the Minns Government.

Media offices
Preceded by David Marr	Presenter of Media Watch; 2005	Succeeded by Monica Attard
