= Contact (2009 film) =

- Poster
- Directed by: Bentley Dean; Martin Butler
- Edited by: Tania Nehme
- Music by: Antony Partos
- Distributed by: Contact Films
- Release date: 2009
- Running time: 78 min.
- Country: Australia
- Languages: English; Martu Wangka

Contact is a 2009 Australian documentary film that tells the story of 20 Martu people who in 1964 became the last people in the Great Sandy Desert to have come into contact with Europeans.

== Synopsis ==
In 1964, a Blue Streak test missile launched from Woomera by ELDO was expected to land in the Percival Lakes area of Western Australia, an area traditionally belonging to the Martu. Two Native Welfare patrol officers, Walter MacDougall and Terry Long, were sent to the area to make sure it was uninhabited. When they arrived, they located a group of 20 Martu women and children in the area. The group had never seen white skinned people before and upon seeing the patrol officers they wanted nothing to do with them, and they ran away from them. Despite the presence of the Martu people in the area, a missile was still fired from Woomera, but it went far off course, landing hundreds of miles away from the lakes.

After several months, a second missile was scheduled to be deployed and Walter MacDougall and Terry Long returned to the area with two interpreters, Punuma Sailor and Nyani, in an attempt to take the group of Martu women and children away from the Percival Lakes area. When the group was located this time, the patrol officers tied their ankles together to stop them from escaping and took them to Jigalong mission.

Throughout the film, the experiences of the Martu women and children are described by Yuwali who was 17 years old when she was a part of this group back in 1964. Now 62 years old, she shares her memories of growing up around Percival Lakes, her dingo Yuntupa and the first time that she saw the patrol officers and their car.

== Literature ==
A book about the same events documented in Contact was released in 2005, entitled Cleared Out: First Contact in the Western Desert by Sue Davenport, Peter Johnson and Yuwali.

== Awards ==
Ceremony	Category	Result
Prime Minister's Prize for Australian History	Prize for Australian History	Won
Australian Film Institute Awards	Best Feature Length Documentary	Won
Walkley Award	Best Coverage of Indigenous Affairs	Won
Film Critics Circle of Australia	Best Feature Documentary	Won
New South Wales Premier's History Awards	Multimedia History Prize	Won
Sydney Film Festival	Foxtel Documentary Prize	Won
Australian Directors Guild	Best Achievement in Directing for a Documentary	Won
Australian Screen Sound Guild	Best Achievement in Sound for a Documentary	Won
Australian Cinematographers Society	Bronze Award for Cinematography: Documentaries, Cinema and TV	Won
Chicago International Film Festival, United States	Gold Hugo for Best Television Production & Best Documentary: Social/Political	Won
Miradas Film Festival, Canary Islands	Best Documentary	Won
Annu-ru Aboro Film Festival, New Caledonia	Best Documentary: Pacific/Oceania	Won
Planete Doc Review Film Festival, Poland	Ecumenical Dialogue Award	Won
FIFO, Tahiti	Le Grand Prix du Jury	Won
