= Granaz Moussavi =

Iranian-Australian poet and filmmaker

- گراناز موسوی
- Born: 1974 (age 51–52); Tehran, Iran
- Citizenship: Australian
- Occupations: Poet, film director
- Known for: Avant-garde poetry, film
- Notable work: My Tehran for Sale (2009); When Pomegranates Howl (2021)

Granaz Moussavi (Persian : گراناز موسوی; born 1974) is an Iranian-Australian contemporary poet, film director, and screenwriter, based in Adelaide, South Australia. She is known for her avant-garde poetry in the 1990s. Her debut feature film My Tehran for Sale (2009) is an internationally-acclaimed Australian-Iranian co-production. Her second feature film, When Pomegranates Howl, was nominated for the 14th Asia Pacific Screen Awards as the Best Youth Feature Film, and was selected as Australian entry for the Best International Feature Film at the 94th Academy Awards.

== Early life and education ==
Granaz Moussavi was born in Tehran in 1974. Her father was a sound engineer at the main TV station in Tehran, and her mother was a video grader. She went to Razi primary school and Hadaf High School in Tehran.

When she was young she often spent time with her parents at the television studios, and had her first acting role in a film made by her father. Her love for cinema and theatre changed her mind about tertiary education. She withdrew from a B.Sc. at Alzahra University and took various drama courses in Tehran, focusing on acting. These included Hamid Samandarian's drama workshops at the Theatre Organization of Tehran, and Mahin Oskouei's underground acting classes held in her apartment.

Granaz then worked at a literary magazine in Tehran, and also taught literature and languages.

Granaz emigrated to Australia with her family in her early twenties, joining relatives already settled in the country, and became a citizen within two years. She started to study filmmaking at Flinders University in Adelaide. In 2002, she made her honours film, A Short Film About Colour, shot by Iranian cinematographer Firooz Malekzadeh. The short film earned Granaz the best director award from the university, and an honorary membership to the Australian Screen Directors Authorship Collecting Society (ASDAS).

After receiving an honours degree from Flinders University, Granaz was accepted into the Australian Film, Television and Radio School in Sydney. She graduated with a graduate diploma in film editing in 2006. She was a doctoral candidate with a scholarship at the University of Western Sydney researching "The Aesthetics of Poetic Cinema".

== Career ==
=== Writing ===
At the age of 17, Granaz started writing professionally as a book reviewer and literary critic at "Donyaye Sokhan literary magazine (مجلهٔ ادبی دنیای سخن") in Tehran.

Her first poems were published in 1989, and since then, she has continued writing and publishing poetry in various magazines and collections in Iran and other countries.

Granaz published her first book of poetry, Khatkhati Rooye Shab خط خطی روی شب (Sketching On Night), underground in Tehran in 1996. Her second book, Paberahneh Ta Sobh پابرهنه تا صبح (Barefoot Till Morning), was the winner of جایزه شعر کارنامه یاجایزه شعر امروز ایران Karnameh’s best poetry book of the year award in 2001, and went to at least a fourth edition. She published her third collection, Avazhaye Zan e Biejazeh آوازهای زن بی اجازه (The Songs of the Forbidden Woman), in 2003. A second edition was published.

Her poems have been anthologised worldwide and a bilingual collection was published in France by MEET publishers. Granaz published Les Rescapes De La Patience (translated by Farideh Rava and with a preface by Jean Baptiste Para) after a sponsored literary residency in Saint Nazaire, France.

In the field of poetry, she has conducted many poetry readings worldwide, including her participation in the Paris Autumn Festival in 2000 (introduced and translated by Media Kashigar, managed by Alain Lance), SOAS/London University in 2001, Vienna and Mondorf/Luxembourg in 2003, Saint Nazaire, Nantes, Marseille, Arles/France in 2004–5, Sydney/Australia in 2005, “Caravan of poetry” through Paris, La Rochelle, Marseille, Poitier, and Nantes/France in 2006, the Fifth International Festival of Poetry “Merci Poesie”, Gothenburg/Sweden in 2008, the Iranian Arts and Literature Festival, San Francisco/USA in 2009, and Luxemburg in 2009. She gave a lecture followed by a poetry reading at Stanford University in February 2009 and University of California at Irvine in January 2011.

Much has been written about Granaz's poetry, including by some renowned Iranian writers and critics such as M. Azad, Jalil Doustkhah, Mohammad Rahim Okhovat, Shahrnoush Parsipour, and Ali Babachahi. Her poetry has been translated and published in French, English, Swedish, Spanish, Portuguese, and Kurdish.

=== Filmmaking ===
Moussavi has made several short films and videos.

In 2006, being shortlisted in local, statewide, and across-the-country competitions, she won the Holding Redlich prize for her script pitch at the Screen Producers Association of Australia. Her prize was a sponsorship for her trip to Cannes Film Festival in 2007 to present her project idea in the film market.

Her first feature film My Tehran for Sale (tehran-e-man, haraj تهران من، حراج ), released in Australia in 2009, was shot in July/August 2008 in Tehran. It premiered at the Adelaide Film Festival, and was an official selection of Toronto International Film Festival in September 2009, as well as screening at several other international film fesetivals. The film won the Independent Spirit Inside Film Award 2009, and the jury award for best feature Film at the TriMedia Film Festival in 2010. The film is banned in Iran.

After making her first feature film, Moussavi did some film editing, but also worked as an interpreter in some detention centres both in Australia and offshore, and wrote a lot of poetry.

Her second feature, When Pomegranates Howl (2021), set in Afghanistan, was nominated for the 14th Annual Asia Pacific Screen Awards as the Best Youth Feature Film.

== Awards and recognition ==
In 2004 a DEA thesis at Sorbonne University (Paris III) on Moussavi's poetry was lodged by Etienne Forget.

She was selected as a jury member for 60th International Filmfestival Mannheim-Heidelberg (Germany) 2011, as well as Independent Spirit IF Award 2010 (Australia).

Moussavi has won the following awards:

- Best Director Award, Flinders University, 2002
- Jury Award for Best Feature Film at the TriMedia Film Festival, 2010

== Filmography ==
=== Feature films ===
- 2020: When Pomegranates Howl
- 2009: My Tehran for Sale, a feature film (as writer/director; produced by Cyan Films)

=== Short films and videos ===
- 2008 Into Pieces, a video art
- 2007 Rats Sleep at Night, a short drama
- 2006 1001 Nights, a documentary on Persian poetry in exile.
- 2005 Narrative Theatre Workshop, a 5-hour video, Producer: Relationships S.A.
- 2004 Just Tenants of the Earth, a 30-minute documentary on young refugees and migrants in Australia
- 2004 A Slice Of Tehran Girls, a 30-minute documentary on young girls in Tehran.
- 2002 A Short Film About Colour, a 10-minute short fiction, Honours production, Flinders University.
- 2002 An uncompleted documentary on Woomera Detention Centre
- 2000 A Letter to a Friend, an 8-minute documentary, University of South Australia
- 1999 The Restroom, an 8-minute doco-drama, Flinders University
- 1999 Smoke, a 27-second advertisement

=== As editor ===
- 2006 Love On Track, a 4 minutes drama, Director: Alison Heather.
- 2005 Karma, 3 minutes experimental short film, Director: Josh Tylor, AFTRS.
- 2005 Look Sharp, an 8 minutes drama, Director: Amy Gebhardt, AFTRS. Winner of Best student film at The International Melbourne Film Festival.
- 2005 Rock! I gave you the best years of my life, a 6 minutes documentary, Director: Mathew Walker, AFTRS
- 2003-2004 Turtles Can Fly, a feature film by Bahman Ghobadi, Tehran-Iran & Kurdistan-Iraq (on-set digital editing)

== Selected publications ==
- 1997 Sketching On Night (Graffiti On Night) “ خط خطی روی شب ”, Tehran
- 2000 Barefoot Till Morning "پابرهنه تا صبح " was the winner of Karnameh’s best poetry book of the year award in 2001, Tehran
- Granaz, Moussavi (2009). Songs of a Forbidden Woman. Sali. ISBN 978-9-647-19127-2.
- 2006 Les Rescapes De La Patience, France
- 2011 Red Memory "حافظه قرمز", Australia
- 2012 Canto di Una Donna Senza Permesso, Italy
- "Simin Behbahani (1927–2014)". Middle Eastern literatures. Great Britain: Taylor & Francis. 2015.
