= Molly Reynolds (director) =

Australian producer and director

Molly Reynolds is an Australian producer, screenwriter and director, best known for the 2021 documentary My Name is Gulpilil about acclaimed actor and dancer David Gulpilil (1953–2021).

== Career ==
Many of Reynolds' works are on the subject of Indigenous Australians' experience, which began as a "happy accident" as her partner Rolf de Heer began work on the 2006 film Ten Canoes.

Reynolds wrote and directed Another Country in 2015, and co-wrote and co-directed the single-person ShoPaapaa in 2020.

She also wrote and directed My Name is Gulpilil, about famous Aboriginal actor David Gulpilil, not long before his death (the film was released in March 2021; he died on 29 November of that year).

As part of the 2024 Adelaide Film Festival, she collaborated with artist Archie Moore, whose work is represented in the Australian pavilion at the 2024 Venice Biennale, to create the installation Dwelling (Adelaide Issue) at the Samstag Museum of Art in Adelaide. Open to the public from 11 October 2024 until 29 November 2024, is the fifth iteration of the work (Dwelling) based on memories of Moore's childhood bedroom.

== Other activities ==
Reynolds has also worked as a consultant in the Australian film sector, advising on national qualifications, developing and delivering curricula at a range of universities, and sitting on review panels.

== Filmography ==
Film	Role
The Balanda and the Bark Canoes (2006)	Director
Twelve Canoes (2008)	Producer
Another Country (2015)	Writer, director
Still Our Country (2015)	Director, producer
The Waiting Room (2018)	Director
ShoPaapaa (2020)	Co-writer, co-director
My Name is Gulpilil (2021)	Writer, director
