= Rolf de Heer =

Dutch-Australian film director, writer, producer

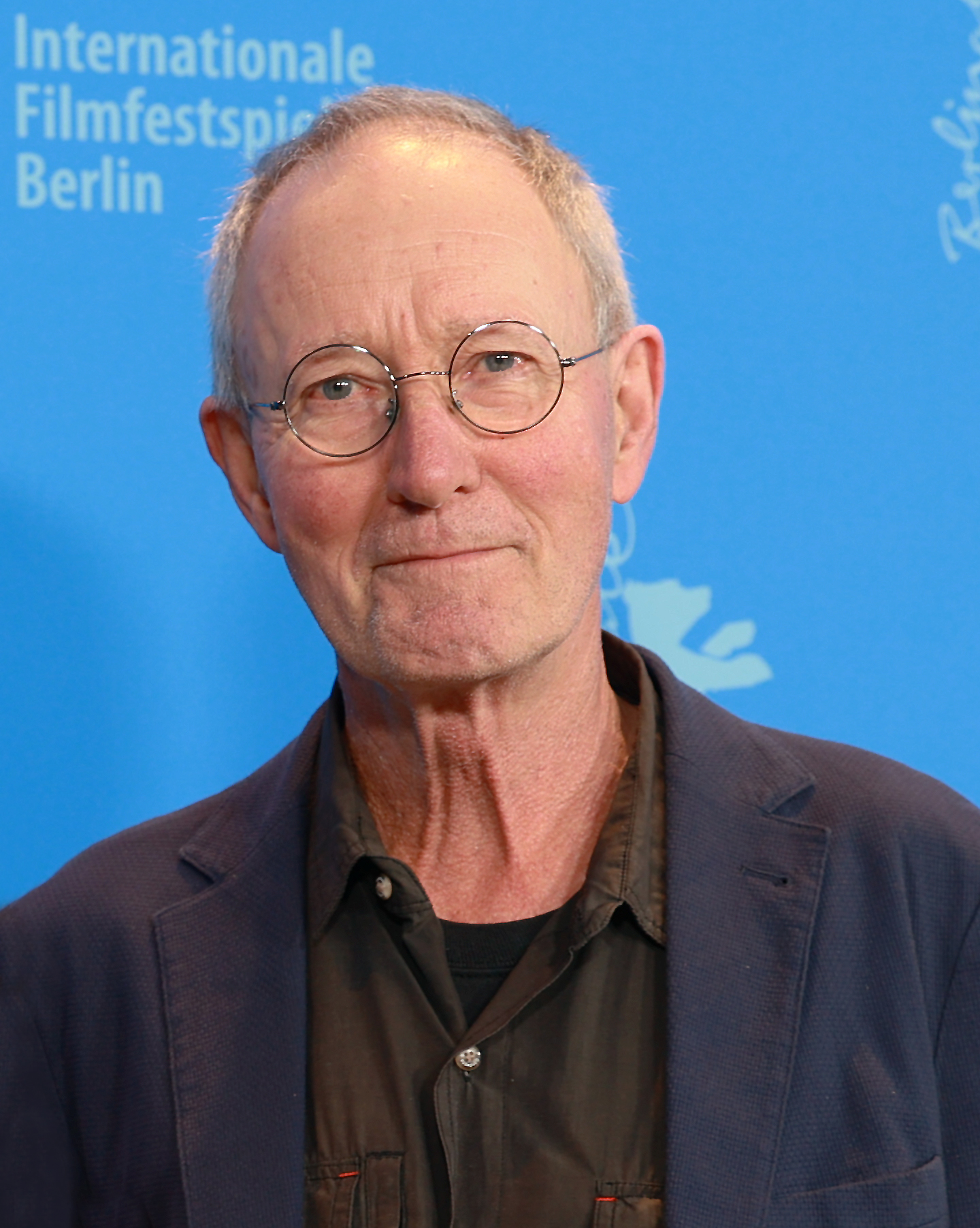
- de Heer in 2023
- Born: 4 May 1951 (age 75); Heemskerk, Netherlands
- Education: Australian Film, Television and Radio School
- Occupations: Film director; film producer; screenwriter
- Years active: 1984–present

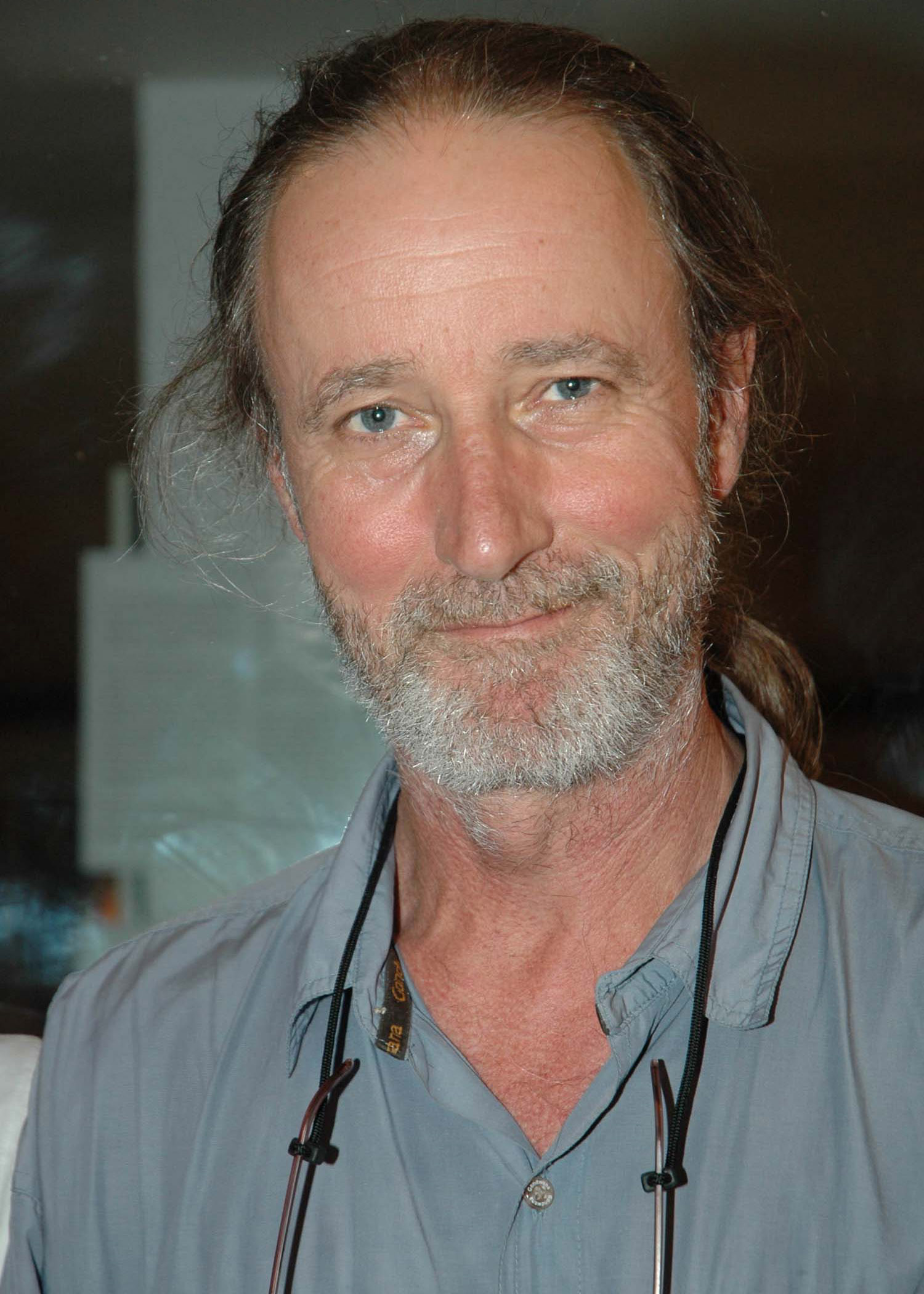
de Heer in 2005

Rolf de Heer (born 4 May 1951) is a Dutch Australian film director.

== Biography ==
De Heer was born in Heemskerk in the Netherlands, but migrated to Sydney with his family when he was eight years old. He attended the Australian Film, Television and Radio School in Sydney. His company is called Vertigo Productions and is based in Adelaide. De Heer primarily makes alternative or arthouse films. According to the jacket notes of the videotape, de Heer holds the honor of co-producing and directing the only motion picture, Dingo, in which the jazz legend Miles Davis appears as an actor. Miles Davis collaborated with Michel Legrand on the score.

He is the subject of the book Dutch Tilt, Aussie Auteur: The Films of Rolf de Heer (First edition – Saarbrücken, Germany: VDM, 2009. Second edition – Ebook: Starrs via Smashwords.com, 2013) by Dr D. Bruno Starrs. A comprehensive study of his films to date, Dancing to His Song: the Singular Cinema of Rolf de Heer by film critic Jane Freebury, is published in ebook and print (Currency Press & Currency House, 2015).

De Heer's 2013 film Charlie's Country was selected to compete in the Un Certain Regard section at the 2014 Cannes Film Festival.

== Filmography ==
Film

Year	Title	Director	Writer	Producer
1980	Gary's Story	No	No	Yes
1984	Tail of a Tiger	Yes	Yes	No
1986	Thank You Jack	Yes	No	Yes
1988	Incident at Raven's Gate	Yes	Yes	Yes
1991	Dingo	Yes	No	Yes
1993	Bad Boy Bubby	Yes	Yes	Yes
1996	The Quiet Room	Yes	Yes	Yes
1997	Epsilon	Yes	Yes	Yes
1998	Dance Me to My Song	Yes	Yes	Yes
2001	The Old Man Who Read Love Stories	Yes	Yes	No
2002	The Tracker	Yes	Yes	Yes
2003	Alexandra's Project	Yes	Yes	Yes
2006	Ten Canoes	Yes	Yes	Yes
2007	Dr. Plonk	Yes	Yes	Yes
2012	The King Is Dead!	Yes	Yes	Yes
2013	Charlie's Country	Yes	Yes	Yes
2016	In the Same Garden	Yes	No	No
2022	The Survival of Kindness	Yes	Yes	Yes

Television and short films

Year	Title	Director	Writer	Producer
2006	The Balanda and Bark Canoes	Yes	No	Yes
2009	Twelve Canoes	Yes	Yes	Yes

== Awards and nominations ==
Year	Award	Category	Work	Result	Ref.
1993	Venice Film Festival	Special Jury Prize	Bad Boy Bubby	Won	
1994	Australian Film Institute Awards	Best Director	Bad Boy Bubby	Won	
1994	Australian Film Institute Awards	Best Original Screenplay	Bad Boy Bubby	Won	
2002	Venice Film Festival	SIGNIS Award	The Tracker	Nominated	
2002	Film Fest Gent	Best Screenplay	The Tracker	Won	
2002	Valladolid International Film Festival	Jury Special Prize	The Tracker	Won	
2002	IF Awards	Best Feature Film	The Tracker	Won	
2006	Cannes Film Festival	Un Certain Regard	Ten Canoes	Won	
2006	Film Fest Gent	Grand Prix	Ten Canoes	Won	
2006	Australian Film Institute Awards	Best Direction	Ten Canoes	Won	
2006	Australian Film Institute Awards	Best Film	Ten Canoes	Won	
2006	Australian Film Institute Awards	Best Original Screenplay	Ten Canoes	Won	
2006	Film Critics Circle of Australia Awards		Ten Canoes		
2006	IF Awards	Best Director	Ten Canoes	Won	
2006	NSW History Awards	The Premier's Audio/Visual History Prize	Ten Canoes	Won	
2013	Adelaide Film Festival	Audience Award for Most Popular Feature	Charlie's Country	Won	
2014	AACTA Award	Best Film	Charlie's Country	Nominated	
2014	AACTA Award	Best Direction	Charlie's Country	Nominated	
2014	AACTA Award	Best Original Screenplay	Charlie's Country	Nominated	
2014	Cannes Film Festival	Un Certain Regard	Charlie's Country	Nominated	
2023	Berlinale Film Festival	Golden Bear	The Survival of Kindness	Nominated	
2023	Berlinale Film Festival	FIPRESCI Award	The Survival of Kindness	Won	

=== Honours ===
- Jury president at the 2026 Tokyo International Film Festival for its section 'Main competition'.

== See also ==
- List of Australian films
