= Jimpa =

2025 film by Sophie Hyde

- Australian theatrical release poster
- Directed by: Sophie Hyde
- Written by: Matthew Cormack; Sophie Hyde
- Produced by: Liam Heyen; Marleen Slot; Sophie Hyde; Bryan Mason
- Starring: Olivia Colman; Aud Mason-Hyde; John Lithgow
- Cinematography: Matthew Chuang
- Edited by: Bryan Mason
- Music by: Nick Ward
- Production companies: Closer Films; Mad Ones Films; Viking Film
- Distributed by: Kismet Movies (Australia); Cinéart (Netherlands)
- Release date: 23 January 2025 (Sundance)
- Running time: 113 minutes
- Countries: Australia; Finland; Netherlands
- Language: English
- Box office: $292,681

Jimpa is a 2025 drama film co-produced and directed by Sophie Hyde, who co-wrote it with Matthew Cormack. Based on Hyde's own family story after her father, Jim Hyde, came out to his wife as gay when they were married with young children, the film stars Olivia Colman, John Lithgow, and Aud Mason-Hyde.

Jimpa had its premiere at the 2025 Sundance Film Festival on 23 January 2025. It had a limited theatrical release in the United States on 5 February 2026 and was released in Australian cinemas on 19 February 2026.

== Synopsis ==
Hannah, along with her nonbinary teenager, Frances, travel to Amsterdam to visit her gay father Jim (known as Jimpa). When Frances wishes to stay with their grandfather for a year, Hannah is forced to re-examine her parenting and her past.

== Cast ==
- Olivia Colman as Hannah
- Aud Mason-Hyde as Frances, Hannah and Harry's child
- John Lithgow as Jim/Jimpa (based on Jim Hyde)
  - Bryn Chapman Parish as young Jim
- Kate Box as Emily, Hannah's sister
- Daniel Henshall as Harry
- Eamon Farren as Richard
- Deborah Kennedy as Katherine
- Hans Kesting as Uri
- Zoë Love Smith as Isa
- Romana Vrede as Mirjam
  - Ani Sidzamba as Young Mirjam
- Jean Janssens as Bis
- Frank Sanders as Dede
- Kanea Blokland as Dylan
- Tilda Cobham-Hervey as herself
- Cody Fern as himself

== Production ==
Jimpa is directed by Sophie Hyde, written by Matthew Cormack, and co-produced by Liam Heyen, Bryan Mason, and Marleen Slot. The film is a co-production between Australia, the Netherlands, and Finland.

Some filming took place in Adelaide in March 2024, including one scene at a café in the East End, which stands in for Amsterdam. Further scenes were shot in Amsterdam and then Helsinki, Finland. Post-production took place in Adelaide.

The story is partly based on Hyde's own family history, with Colman's role as Hannah playing a fictionalised version of Hyde, of which Hyde has said, "In some ways, that was the character that I always felt was least taken from life – but maybe that's just because it's me". Hyde said that Jimpa is in some ways a companion film to her debut feature, 52 Tuesdays (2013), which charts a relationship with her father as they undergo gender transition. At its Australian premiere at the Adelaide Film Festival, Hyde revealed that her father (who died in 2018) had never gone to live in Amsterdam. He had, however, left his family. Aud Mason-Hyde, who plays Frances in the film, is the child of Hyde and Bryan Mason (who edited the film), and is non-binary.

The score was composed by Sydney-based singer, songwriter, producer, and composer Nick Ward. Matthew Chuang was cinematographer, and Bryan Mason edited the film.

The closing credits are accompanied by a cover of MUNA's "I know a place", sung by Australian singer-songwriter Brendan Maclean and Aud Mason-Hyde. Mason-Hyde also sings solo during the film. The film runs for 113 minutes.

The family and the actors talked about the making of the film in an episode of the documentary series Australian Story on ABC Television on 16 February 2026, shortly before its release in Australian cinemas. Olivia Colman said that Jimpa "helped restore her faith in her art" because it was such a collaborative and creative process the way that Hyde worked with her actors. She also "love[d] the fact that this film is about learning how to listen to each other without throwing the toys out the crib" and thinks that Hollywood is too nervous about making queer stories. Hyde said that, while all of her films are personal on some level, Jimpa is the most explicitly personal, naming it after her grandfather and recreating her family structure and stories.

== Release ==
The film had its world premiere at the Sundance Film Festival on 23 January 2025. It had its Australian premiere as the opening gala film at the Adelaide Film Festival on 15 October 2025 at the Capri Theatre.

Following the Sundance premiere, it was reported that the film was struggling to find a US distributor, with some citing the rise in anti-LGBTQ rhetoric in the country following the second inauguration of Donald Trump as a reason for the lack of studio interest. The film was later picked up for release in the US by distributor Kino Lorber, who partnered with Hyde on her first film, 52 Tuesdays.

The film was distributed in Europe by Netherlands-based Cinéart. The film had a limited theatrical release in Slovakia on 4 December 2025 and in the United States on 6 February 2026 (10 cinemas), where it grossed $24,291 by 15 February.

The film is being distributed in Australia by Sydney-based Kismet Movies.

Jimpa opened the 33rd Mardi Gras Film Festival in Sydney on 12 February 2026, in its New South Wales premiere. In a special screening at Cinema Nova in Melbourne on 17 February, Hyde, Aud Mason-Hyde, and Daniel Henshall gave a Q&A afterwards. The film is being released in Australian cinemas on 19 February 2026.

== Reception ==
On the review aggregator website Rotten Tomatoes, 50% of 58 critics' reviews are positive, with an average rating of 6/10. The website's consensus reads: "Olivia Coleman and John Lithgow turn in wonderful performances but this overly sentimental attempt at pathos often overstays its welcome." Metacritic, which uses a weighted average, assigned the film a score of 47 out of 100, based on 15 critics, indicating "mixed or average" reviews. Critics' reviews after Sundance were mostly lukewarm, praising the performances of Colman and Lithgow, but suggesting that Hyde tries to cover too much ground, resulting in a meandering plot. Robert Daniels writing on RogerEbert.com, criticised the film's lack of nuance and subtlety, and called it a "sprawling endeavor" that lacks focus.

Peter Debruge, writing in Variety, calls the film "category-defying", and said that Lithgow's role was his richest since The World According to Garp. Chase Hutchinson, writing for TheWrap, wrote that Hyde "capture[d] a life...about as fully as one could ever hope to do", and that the film is "not just incisive and compassionate, but fully attuned to the rhythms of this modern family". He writes that Olivia Colman and John Lithgow "soar" in the film, but reserves particular praise for Aud Mason-Hyde, saying that they are "a breakout star". He also praises the cinematography by Matthew Chuang.

After the film's Adelaide premiere, Stephen A. Russell, writing in ScreenHub Australia, gave the film 4 out of 5 stars, praising the acting (Mason-Hyde is "revelatory"; "the brilliant Box exaggerates her brassy Australianness with fizzing fabulousness") as well as many aspects of the film production, including direction, cinematography, musical score, and editing. He writes that Hyde "explores family dynamics with sensitivity and subtlety", in this "meta-textually sumptuous reckoning with [her] upbringing, which freely and fictitiously rewrites that narrative". Heather Taylor Johnson, writing in InDaily, says that the writers (Hyde and McCormack) are "interested in spotlighting an intergenerational queer family in which people love one another unconditionally and are proud of one another, where they choose how to live their lives fearlessly, with openness and love and boundless support". She highlights one of the questions posed by Hannah, whether drama can exist without conflict, and concludes that it can.

Peter Gray of The AU Review gave the film 3.5 out of 5 stars, summing up: "Jimpa may not always trust its viewers to read between the lines, but it's an emotive, compassionate portrait of a family trying – imperfectly, tenderly – to love each other well. And in a cinematic landscape that often reduces queer stories to trauma or triumph, there’s something quietly radical about a film that simply lets a family talk, argue, and stay". Stun Magazine, a Canberra-based magazine for the queer community, gave it 4.5 stars. FilmInk's Cain Noble-Davies, while praising aspects of the film, wrote "it often feels like the film gets lost on its own journey across the family's subplots", and opines that it is not as strong as Hyde's previous films in terms of audience engagement.

== See also ==
- Cinema of Australia
