= South Australian Film Corporation =

Film production company in South Australia

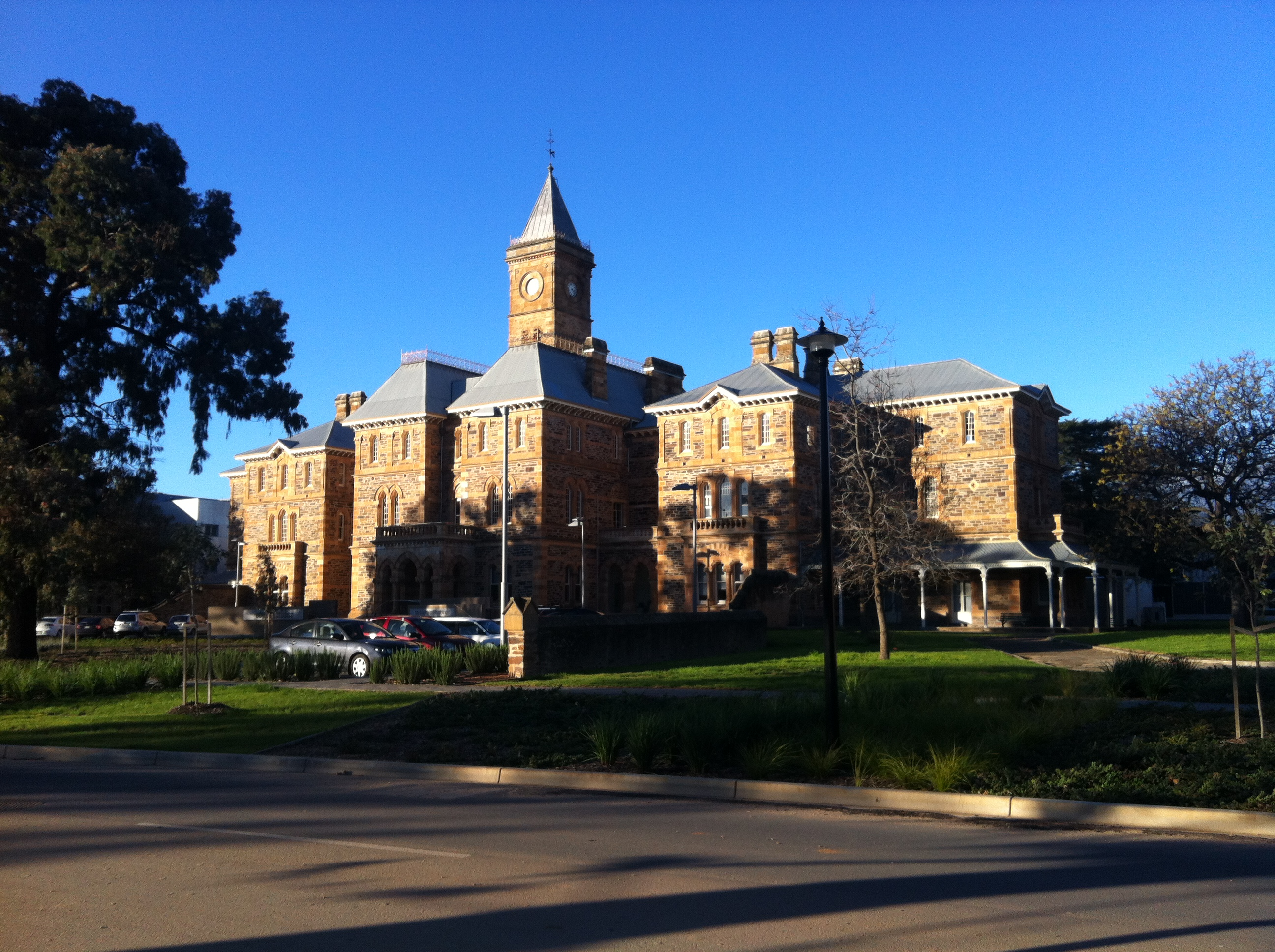
- Industry: Entertainment
- Headquarters: Adelaide, Australia
- Website: www.safilm.com.au

South Australian Film Corporation (SAFC) is a South Australian Government statutory corporation established in 1972 to engage in film production and promote the film industry, located in Adelaide, South Australia. The Adelaide Studios are managed by the South Australian Film Corporation for the use of the South Australian film industry.

== History ==
=== 1972–2000 ===
The South Australian Film Corporation was founded as a production company in 1972, established under the South Australian Film Corporation Act by the Dunstan government. It was intended “to stimulate and encourage the formation and continued development of the South Australian film and television industry”. At the time of the Corporation's establishment, the Australian film industry was stagnating, and the Corporation played a significant role in the revival of Australian film making. Premier Don Dunstan played an instrumental role in the foundation of the Corporation and its early film production activities.

From its genesis, the SAFC collaborated with various government departments and agencies in the production of short documentaries and educational films. These included co-productions with the South Australian Department of Agriculture and Fisheries, Department of Marine & Harbors, the Education Department, the Office of Fair Trading, the Department of Housing, Urban and Regional Affairs and others.

In the 1980s, the SAFC shifted its focus to television production. It relocated to a disused Philips factory in Hendon in the north-west suburbs of Adelaide. Jock Bair was head of drama.

In 1994 its role changed, as it ceased producing films and became the government's central agency to provide assistance to independent film makers. The television mini-series The Battlers was the last production produced by the SAFC. As the first state film corporation in Australia, the success of its business model led other state governments to establish similar bodies charged with the promotion of film production and fostering industry development. Since then, it has focused on supporting (including providing funding) and facilitating the production of films and television in South Australia, as well as making production and post-production facilities available.

==== Film library collections ====
In 1974, the South Australian Film Corporation Library (and within it, the Film Library) absorbed two film libraries previously held by the Education Department: the Educational Film Library (EFL) and the Documentary Film Library (DFL), comprising 10,000 films. The EFL consisted of curriculum-oriented material on 16mm films. The DFL spanned films for non-school organisations. These collections were moved to a new location at O'Connell Street, North Adelaide. In July 2001, the South Australian Film Corporation Collection of scripts and ephemera was given to the Flinders University Library.

=== 21st century ===
SAFC facilitated the production of the Nine Network program McLeod's Daughters (2001–2009), which was filmed on location in rural South Australia.

==== 2008: relocation ====
In 2008, SA Premier and Arts Minister Mike Rann secured cabinet approval from the South Australian Government to fund the relocation of the SAFC at a cost of A$43 million. The project included new sound stages and mixing suites, as well as a major refurbishment of an historic 19th-century building as a high-tech film hub. The Corporation moved its headquarters to Glenside, an inner eastern suburb of Adelaide, sharing the historic former administration building of Glenside Hospital with film production company Closer Productions. The new Adelaide Studios were opened by Rann on 20 October 2011.

==== 2009–2012: FilmLab ====
FilmLab was a low-budget feature film initiative created in 2008, with a budget of A$4.2 million to be allocated to the production of eight low-budget feature films over four years, from initial concept through to delivery and marketing of the films. In May 2009 the four successful teams were announced, chosen from a shortlist of 14: Sophie Hyde, Bryan Mason, and Matt Cormack of Closer Productions; Hugh Nguyen and Eddie White of the People's Republic of Animation; Julie Ryan of Cyan Films with Matthew Bate of Plexus Films; and Ashlee Page and Sonya Humphrey of Sacred Cow Films. The initiative ran until 2012, and was credited with launching the careers of at least 12 filmmakers, and also helped to bring to fruition critically acclaimed films including Shut Up Little Man, 52 Tuesdays and The Infinite Man. The idea was reprised in a new initiative in 2021, Film Lab: New Voices.

==== 2017–present ====
In 2017, the Corporation announced that a new TV Series called "Soccer Swap" was a co-production with Australia's 57 Films and China's Qingdao TV.

Also in 2017, The Heysen Hicks Set Construction Studio, so named in honour of filmmakers Scott Hicks and his wife Kerry Heysen AM, was opened.

James Wan's reboot of video game franchise Mortal Kombat as a feature film was the largest film production in the state's history. In May 2019, it was announced that the film had entered pre-production and would be shot in South Australia, before being released in April 2021.

In August 2019, CEO Courtney Gibson resigned, returning to Sydney 15 months after taking up the role. A few weeks later, the government confirmed the appointment of South Australian producer Kate Croser, who has had a long career in Australian film and television.

Amanda Duthie, who in late 2018 left her post at the Adelaide Film Festival and became Head of Production, Development, Attraction and Studios, also serving as acting CEO of SAFC after Gibson's departure, resigned her position to return to Sydney as of 22 November 2019.

== Governance and funding ==
The Corporation was responsible to the state Minister for the Arts until March 2018, then reported to the Premier Steven Marshall until July that year, when it was transferred to the Department of Innovation and Skills. From 1996 it received funding via Arts SA (later Arts South Australia), until that body's disbandment by the Marshall government in late 2018.

In June 2019, the state government announced a huge boost to funding of the film industry, with a one-off A$6 million awarded to the SAFC's Screen Production Investment Fund. Mortal Kombat is a major recipient.

== Current strategies and projects ==
=== First Nations Screen Strategy 2020–2025 ===
The First Nations Screen Strategy 2020–2025 was launched in November 2020, in partnership with Channel 44. The First Nations Advisory Committee comprises Elaine Crombie, Natasha Wanganeen, Major Moogy Sumner, Dennis Stokes, and John Harvey.

=== Film Lab: New Voices ===
"Film Lab: New Voices" is an initiative launched in 2021, delivered by the SAFC and the Adelaide Film Festival (AFF), in collaboration with Mercury CX, with the delivery of the development phase of the inaugural round assisted by Screen Australia. It enables teams of emerging filmmakers to develop a low-budget feature film over a 12-month period, mentored by an experienced story developer, with one team chosen for funding to complete the making of their film ready for the next AFF. At least one member of each team must be from a group under-represented in the SA film industry, including filmmakers who are women; First Nations; Culturally and Linguistically Diverse (CALD); Deaf and disabled; LGBTQIA+; and/or who live in regional and remote parts of the state.

In the inaugural round, 49 teams submitted 63 projects, and three teams were selected for further development of their projects over an 11-month period. Funding of A$400,000 (US$288,000) was provided by the SAFC and AFF for the winning team, comprising director Matt Vesely (director), Lucy Campbell (scriptwriter) and Bettina Hamilton (producer), to bring their film Monolith to the 2022 AFF. The other two teams continue to be developed and will seek funding to bring their projects to completion: In The Mati, from writer/director Peter Ninos and producer Georgia Humphreys; and In The Storm, from writer/director Madeleine Parry and producer Peta Astbury Bulsara.

The second round opened in August 2021, with seven projects shortlisted in February 2022 and the three successful teams eligible for further development to be announced in March 2022. To support the SAFC First Nations Screen Strategy (2020–2025), one of the three teams selected for development will have at least two members identifying as Aboriginal and/or Torres Strait Islander. The winning team comprised writer-directors Emma Hough Hobbs and Leela Varghese, and producer Tom Phillips, who made the animated sci-fi comedy Lesbian Space Princess, which premiered at Adelaide Film Festival on 27 October 2024. The two other teams making it to the top three were awarded grants of $20,000 grant to further develop their scripts: For the Record, from writer/director Alies Sluiter and producer William Littleton; and The Forgotten, from writer Travis Akbar, director Thibul Nettle, and producer Joshua Trevorrow.

In the third round, applications from teams including at least one Deaf and/or disabled creative were given priority. The winning team were co-writers Pearl Berry and Piri Eddy, director Johanis Lyons-Reid, and producer Lilla Berry. Their film, a horror film titled The Debt, is led by First Nations creatives. The film, which stars Sophie Lowe, Nathan Page, and Tahlia Sturzaker, was retitled Lucrum ahead of its premiere on 23 October 2026 at the Adelaide Film Festival.

== Influence on Australian filmmaking ==
The Corporation's activities contributed to the rebuilding process undertaken by Australia's film industry, with other states set up similar bodies after SAFC's establishment. Besides its productions that had critical and commercial success in the 1970s, the Corporation's productions helped to launch the careers of many artists, including Peter Weir, Jack Thompson, Scott Hicks, Rolf de Heer, Mario Andreacchio, Bryan Brown, Geoffrey Rush and Bruce Beresford.

The Adelaide Studios have provided facilities for feature films such as The Babadook, Hotel Mumbai, Storm Boy, I Am Mother and Mortal Kombat, as well as many television series.

== Screen Creatives Hub ==
The Adelaide Studios are also the location for a number of tenants, all businesses concerned with filmmaking. As of January 2024, these include the Adelaide Film Festival, Body Image Movement, Closer Productions, Highview Productions, and Triptych Pictures.

Highview Productions is headed by producer Lisa Scott, who founded the company in 2019. It is responsible for the feature film A Sunburnt Christmas and the TV series The Tourist, both of which won awards, as well as the series Janet King and The Hunting. Scott, who is originally from New South Wales, did a film production course at AFTRS in 1988, and then worked for ABC Television from 1989 until 1998. Since then she has worked as an independent producer. Highview was selected as the SBS Emerging Writers' Incubator host company. This initiative was being run by SBS and Screen Australia, and supported by the SAFC, as of 2022. In 2024 she was selected to participate in Global Producers Exchange, an AiF/Screen Australia initiative, and in mid-May 2024 is joining an Adelaide Film Festival delegation to the Marché du Film at the Cannes Film Festival. Scott and Rebecca Summerton of Closer Productions are collaborating on the production of a series based on the best-selling book by Adelaide author Pip Williams, The Dictionary of Lost Words. Actor and writer Elena Carapetis works as a story consultant for Highview Studios.

Triptych Pictures is run by Kristian Moliere (formerly of Smoking Gun Productions) and Julie Byrne, who were responsible for producing the feature films The Babadook, Lucky Country, and The Survival of Kindness (2022), among others; the TV series Wake in Fright; and YouTube videos for Danny and Michael Philippou.

== Major productions ==
Works listed below can be found via the SAFC "Made in SA Showcase" web page.

=== SAFC as producer ===
- Sunday Too Far Away (1975)
- Picnic at Hanging Rock (1975) (co-production with McElroy & McElroy)
- Smokes and Lollies (1975) (short documentary)
- Storm Boy (1976)
- The Fourth Wish (1976)
- The Last Wave (1977) (co-production with McElroy & McElroy)
- Blue Fin (1978) (co-production with McElroy & McElroy)
- The Irishman (1978) (co-production with Forest Home Films)
- Money Movers (1978)
- The Sound of Love (1978) (TV movie)
- Weekend of Shadows (1978)
- Dawn! (1979)
- Harvest of Hate (1979 TV movie)
- The Plumber (1979) (TV movie)
- Breaker Morant (1980)
- The Club (1980)
- Pacific Banana (1981)
- The Survivor (1981) (co-production)
- Freedom (1982)
- Teenage (1982)
- Sara Dane (1982) (TV mini-series)
- For the Term of His Natural Life (1983) (TV mini-series)
- Under Capricorn (1983) (TV mini-series)
- The Fire in the Stone (1984 TV movie)
- Robbery Under Arms (1985) (Feature film and mini-series)
- Playing Beatie Bow (1986)
- Run, Chrissie, Run! (TV) (1986) (Video)
- The Shiralee (TV) (1987 TV movie)
- Sebastian and the Sparrow (1988)
- Ultraman: Towards the Future (1990) (co-production with Japan's Tsuburaya Productions)
- Finders Keepers (1991 TV series)
- Bad Boy Bubby (1993)
- Hammers Over the Anvil (1993)
- The Battlers (1994) (TV mini-series)

=== SAFC as production facilitator ===
- Golden Fiddles (1994) (TV mini-series)
- The Life of Harry Dare (1995)
- Napoleon (1995)
- Shine (1996)
- Sun on the Stubble (1996) (TV mini-series)
- Kiss or Kill (1997)
- Dance Me to My Song (1998)
- The Fairies (1998, 2000 (Vintage VHS) – 2005, 2007, 2009 (TV series))
- McLeod's Daughters (2001–2009) (TV series)
- The Old Man Who Read Love Stories (2001)
- Australian Rules (2002)
- Rabbit-Proof Fence (2002)
- The Honourable Wally Norman (2003)
- Alexandra's Project (2003)
- Thunderstruck (2004)
- Deck Dogz (2005)
- Look Both Ways (2005)
- Wolf Creek (2005)
- The Caterpillar Wish (2006)
- Like Minds (2006)
- Opal Dream (2006)
- Ten Canoes (2006)
- December Boys (2007)
- Lucky Miles (2007)
- Rain Shadow (2007) (TV series)
- Beautiful (2009)
- Sweet Country (2017)
- Limbo (2023)
- The Speedway Murders (2023)

== See also ==
- Film and television financing in Australia
- List of film production companies
- List of television production companies
