= Monolith (2022 film) =

- Film poster
- Directed by: Matt Vesely
- Written by: Lucy Campbell
- Produced by: Bettina Hamilton
- Starring: Lily Sullivan
- Cinematography: Michael Tessari
- Edited by: Tania Nehme
- Music by: Benjamin Speed
- Distributed by: Bonsai Films (Australia and New Zealand)
- Release dates: 27 October 2022 (AFF); 25 August 2023 (New Zealand); 26 October 2023 (Australia)
- Running time: 93 minutes
- Country: Australia
- Language: English
- Budget: <A$500,000

Monolith is a 2022 Australian science-fiction thriller film directed by Matt Vesely, written by Lucy Campbell, and produced by Bettina Hamilton. Described as high-concept science fiction, it stars Lily Sullivan, the only on-screen actor in the film, as a journalist uncovering a mystery.

The film premiered in Australia on 27 October 2022 at the Adelaide Film Festival, and internationally at SXSW in March 2023.

== Plot ==
The central character (known only as The Interviewer) is a disgraced journalist who, depressed and alone in her parents' large home while they are away, takes up podcasting about unsolved mysteries in the hopes of reviving her career. She invites listeners to phone in with their stories. A story begins to build around a strange black brick, first reported by a maid named Floramae, and followed by many others who report the mysterious appearance of a similar object in their lives.

The story is simple, but anxiety and tension is built further with the introduction of a German art collector, Klaus, who has a collection of the bricks, and has had them scanned and analysed.

The Interviewer's mental health declines as the story proceeds, and after she comes to the startling realisation that she herself is involved in the backstory of one of the bricks, the final scenes leave their interpretation open to the audience.

== Cast ==
- Lily Sullivan as The Interviewer
- Erik Thomson as Dad (voice)
- Kate Box as Laura (voice)
- Terence Crawford as Klaus (voice)
- Damon Herriman (voice)
- Ling Cooper Tang as Floramae (voice)
- Ansuya Nathan as Paula (voice)
- Matt Crook as Scott (voice)
- Rashidi Edward as John (voice)
- Brigid Zengeni as Shiloh (voice)
- Belle Kalendra-Harding

== Production ==
Monolith was the first feature film produced as part of a joint initiative called "Film Lab: New Voices", by South Australian Film Corporation (SAFC) and the Adelaide Film Festival (AFF). A development lab ran for 11 months, in which three projects, chosen from an initial 63 entries proposed by 49 teams, developed their scripts; one script was then chosen for production. Monolith received an initial A$400,000 in funding from SAFC and AFF, with additional funding from Mercury CX. The film's total budget was under A$500,000.

Lucy Campbell wrote the script; it was directed by Matt Vesely (development manager at Closer Productions) and produced by Bettina Hamilton. The cinematographer is Michael Tessari and Tania Nehme edited the film.

Principal photography took place in the Adelaide Hills from late May 2022, shot over 15 days consecutively and in the same order as the events in the film. The entire film was shot in one location, with only one on-screen actor (Lily Sullivan); various other actors are heard over the telephone, including Damon Herriman, Erik Thomson and Kate Box.

On-screen actor Lily Sullivan said in a 2023 interview that her role was the "challenge of a lifetime". She called it "terrifying", and said, "I ended up approaching it like theatre, almost... I've never been more aware of my voice".

== Release ==
Monolith premiered at the Adelaide Film Festival on 27 October 2022.

In January 2023 it was announced that it would have its official world premiere at the SXSW Film Festival; it took place on 13 March 2023, with two further screenings at the festival.

Monolith also screened at the Gold Coast Film Festival in HOTA, Surfers Paradise, Queensland, in April 2023; and the film's Asian premiere was at the Bucheon International Fantastic Film Festival in South Korea on 1 July 2023. It was listed by Screen Hub as one of "ten must-see films" at the Melbourne International Film Festival. It premiered in the UK at FrightFest in London on 26 August 2023, and was selected to screen at many other festivals through the year, including Overlook Film Festival (New Orleans); Brussels International Fantastic Film Festival; Fantasy Filmfest (Germany); CinefestOz; Octopus Film Festival (Gdańsk, Poland); and Sitges Film Festival (Sitges, Spain).

The film secured international sales teams, XYZ Films for North America and Blue Finch Films in the UK. Todd Brown, head of international acquisitions at XYZ, said of director Matt Veseley, "We haven't been more excited about a filmmaker since we first came across Aaron Moorhead and Justin Benson with their debut feature Resolution" (released 2013).

The distributor of Monolith in Australian and New Zealand cinemas is Bonsai Films; and in North America, Well Go USA Entertainment. Blue Finch handles other international sales.

Monolith had a limited release in New Zealand cinemas from 25 August 2023.

It was released in Australian cinemas from 26 October 2023, shortly after screening at SXSW Sydney, and Q&A preview screenings in South Australia. It grossed $7,168 by the end of its opening weekend in Australia.

Monolith was released on DVD and on the Australian streaming service Binge on 15 December 2023, It is also available for purchase on Amazon Prime in Australia.

It was released in cinemas in the US on 16 February 2024, preceded by a trailer released by distributors Well Go USA. It was released in the UK and Ireland on VOD by Blue Finch Films from 26 February 2024, and the Blu-ray was released by Well Go USA on 23 April 2024.

== Reception ==
Monolith has been variously described as sci-fi thriller and horror.

The film has a rating of 88% on review aggregate site Rotten Tomatoes, based on 56 critics' reviews. The site consensus reads "Carried by Lily Sullivan's outstanding lead performance and enriched by an expertly administered sense of creeping claustrophobia, Monolith is an eerie thriller that burns slow and lingers".

After its screening at the Adelaide Film Festival, Rachael Mead of InDaily wrote: "Sullivan is superb as the ethically dubious journalist", and "Beneath the thrilling claustrophobia lies a cunning puncturing of privilege and a clear-eyed critique of the way we construct, manipulate and ultimately consume 'truth' in a globalised world".

Reviews after the SXSW screenings were nearly all positive. Luke Gorham (In Review Online) draws parallels with the plot of Kiarostami's Shirin, only in reverse. He praises Sullivan's performance, along with several other reviewers, and Vesely's direction, Lucy Campbell's script, Tessari's cinematography, and Benjamin Speed's score are all praised by several reviewers. ScreenAnarchy reviewers wrote "Monolith is an intelligent, exquisitely mounted creeping nightmare of a film". Anton Bitel compares Monolith with David Lynch's Lost Highway and Michael Haneke's Hidden, in that it too "is ultimately a tale of troubled conscience and conflicted self, where everything ultimately comes from within". Jennie Kermode of Eye for Film writes in her four-star review: "Monolith is a great example of how small things can be used to tell a big story". Variety was the only dissenting review at that point, finding that the second half let down the promise of the first.

Monolith received good reviews following its showing at FrightFest in London in August 2023.

David Stratton, writing in The Australian, called the film a "strangely gripping supernatural thriller, one that keeps the audience guessing and withholds a few of its secrets..." and went on to write "the film may baffle some viewers and enthral others, but on its own chosen level it works most satisfactorily and it's another example of an offbeat and impressive Australian film backed by the Adelaide International Film Festival". Australian critic Andrew F Peirce praised the film and Sullivan's performance, and wrote "It's clear that Matt Vesely and Lucy Campbell are eager champions of genre-filmmaking in Australia, with a confident debut feature that utilises limited resources to create a story that's expansive and genuinely otherworldly". ScreenHub Australia listed it as one of the 10 best horror films of 2023.

On the eve of its US cinema release, New York Times reviewer Calum Marsh wrote, "The film is most effective when at its most granular, as Sullivan's character carefully splices snippets of audio recordings and pores over research materials, scenes strongly reminiscent of Michelangelo Antonioni’s Blow-Up and Brian De Palma's Blow Out". After its release, Guardian reviewer Phil Hoad gave the film four out of five, mentioning its references to 2001: A Space Odyssey and Denis Villeneuve's 2016 sci-fi drama Arrival and calling it an "impressive debut". Brian Tallerico, reviewing the film on RogerEbert.com, gave the film 3 stars out of 5, praising Sullivan's "remarkable" performance. He concluded "In the end, the goal was clearly to trap us in the increasingly fractured mind of a single person who increasingly believes what is beyond believable. Mission accomplished". An interview with Vesely by Zachary Lee was also published on RogerEbert.com. Lee wrote that Monolith "above all else, demonstrates how to do more with less", and discussed how the film "had something to say" - it is not just straightforward horror or sci-fi film.

An analytical article by an academic on The Conversation website looks at the film's commentary on narrowcasting: "Monolith is one of the first Australian films to critically navigate the ramifications of narrowcasting technology". The writer considers that "the strange solitude of interpersonal communication in the global information economy underpins the whole thing", and describes it as "a decidedly low-key film, but this should not be mistaken for dull. It is an arresting chiller, extremely tightly performed and made". Alexandra Heller-Nicholas, reviewing the 2025 film Birthright for the Alliance of Women Film Journalists, compared it with a couple of other single-location, low-budget, Australian genre films, including Monolith, writing that these films offer "collective masterclasses in doing a lot with a little".

Further reviews followed its release on streaming platforms. The Reviews Hub notes the effect of the COVID-19 pandemic on the script and atmosphere, although it is never mentioned in the film: the unsettling script that reflects the mood of paranoia brought by the pandemic, including the suggestion that the monolith may be the source of a viral illness, as well as the main character, forced into isolation, letting her appearance slide, as many during the pandemic did. The reviewer, however, calls the film "far from being a documentary or social commentary", "highly original", and "deeply creepy". Another reviewer wrote that the film stands out among one-actor films by clever direction, including the use of visual cues to further the story and character development, in "a far more cinematic approach" than some examples of the genre. Bleeding Cool News called Monolith a "thoughtful, mysterious, and ambiguous entry in psychological horror". Road Rash Reviews called it a "4 star eerie and effective sci-fi thriller".

== Awards and nominations ==
Monolith was nominated as one of eight (out of 72) in Total Film's FrightFest Awards for Best Film, and Sullivan won Best Actress.

It was selected as one of four nominees for the CinefestOZ Film Prize, the richest film prize in the country and worth A$100,000, in September 2023. (It lost to Shayda, which was submitted for the Best International Feature category in the 2024 Academy Awards.)

At Sitges Film Festival, Monolith was nominated for the New Visions Award (Best Motion Picture). Benjamin Speed's soundtrack was nominated for Best Original Song Composed for the Screen at the 2023 Screen Music Awards.

Vesely was nominated in the "Best Direction in a Debut Feature Film" category in the 2023 ADG Awards. David Scarborough was nominated for a "Best Editing in Trailers and Promos" award in the Australian Screen Editors Awards.

Monolith was nominated in the Best Indie Film category in the 2024 AACTA Awards, along with Ivan Sen's Limbo, Rolf de Heer's The Survival of Kindness, Mark Leonard Winter's The Rooster, A Savage Christmas, and Streets of Colour.

In April 2024, Lucy Campbell was awarded the John Hinde Award for Excellence in Science-Fiction Writing in the produced category by the Australian Writers' Guild, for her screenplay.

Monolith won Best Feature film at the South Australian Screen Awards in June 2024.
