= Aftertaste (TV series) =

Australian TV comedy series

- Genre: Comedy
- Created by: Julie De Fina; Matthew Bate
- Written by: Julie De Fina; Matthew Bate; Matt Vesely
- Directed by: Jonathan Brough (s. 1); Renée Webster (s. 2)
- Starring: Erik Thomson; Rachel Griffiths; Natalie Abbott
- Music by: Benjamin Speed
- Country of origin: Australia
- Original language: English
- No. of series: 2
- No. of episodes: 12

Production
- Executive producers: Julie De Fina; Rachel Griffiths
- Producers: Rebecca Summerton; Erik Thomson
- Production location: Adelaide Hills
- Production company: Closer Productions

Original release
- Network: ABC Television
- Release: 3 February 2021 – 24 August 2022

Aftertaste is an Australian television comedy series on ABC TV, first airing on 3 February 2021. It is created by Julie De Fina and Matthew Bate, produced by Closer Productions. The first season was directed by Jonathan Brough, and the second, airing from 20 July 2022, by Renée Webster.

== Plot summary ==
The series revolves around Easton West, an internationally renowned, yet volatile celebrity chef who has a spectacular fall from grace and returns to his hometown in the Adelaide Hills. He endeavours to rebuild his career and restore his reputation, with the help of his talented, young, pastry-chef niece Diana.

== Cast ==
=== Season 1 ===
- Erik Thomson as Easton West
- Natalie Abbott as Diana
- Rachel Griffiths as Margot
- Wayne Blair as Brett
- Susan Prior as Denise West
- Peter Carroll as Jim
- Remy Hii as Ben Zhao
- Kavitha Anandasivam as Nayani
- Justin Amankwah as Kwame
- Matt Vesely as Max
- Chantal Contouri as Mama

=== Season 2 ===
Most of the Season 1 cast, as well as:

- Lynette Curran as June
- Julian Maroun as Harry
- Syd Brisbane as Terry
- Lisa Flanagan as Tammy
- Chrissie Page as Pastor Penny

== Episodes ==
=== Series overview ===
Series	Episodes	Originally released	
Series	Episodes	First released	Last released
1	6	3 February 2021	10 March 2021
2	6	20 July 2022	24 August 2022

=== Season 1 (2021) ===
No. in season	Title	Directed by	Written by	Original release date	Australia viewers
1	"Episode 1"	Jonathan Brough	Julie De Fina	3 February 2021	584,000
2	"Episode 2"	Jonathan Brough	Matt Vesely	11 February 2021	438,000
3	"Episode 3"	Jonathan Brough	Matthew Bate and Jodie Molloy	17 February 2021	460,000
4	"Episode 4"	Jonathan Brough	Matthew Bate	24 February 2021	416,000
5	"Episode 5"	Jonathan Brough	Julie de Fina & Matthew Bate	3 March 2021	N/A
6	"Episode 6"	Jonathan Brough	Julie de Fina	10 March 2021	N/A

=== Season 2 (2022) ===
No. in season	Title	Directed by	Written by	Original release date	Australia viewers
1	"Episode 1"	Unknown	Unknown	20 July 2022	N/A
2	"Episode 2"	Unknown	Unknown	27 July 2022	N/A
3	"Episode 3"	Unknown	Unknown	3 August 2022	N/A
4	"Episode 4"	Unknown	Unknown	10 August 2022	N/A
5	"Episode 5"	Unknown	Unknown	17 August 2022	N/A
6	"Episode 6"	Unknown	Unknown	24 August 2022	N/A

== Production ==
Aftertaste was produced by Closer Productions for the Australian Broadcasting Corporation. The ABC provided the majority of financing with Screen Australia and the South Australian Film Corporation (SAFC) also being significant sources of finance. The series was made during the COVID-19 pandemic in Australia, which required the navigation of additional obstacles. SAFC offered business resilience training and other help to the Closer Productions Team.

The producers were Rebecca Summerton, Matthew Bate and Erik Thomson, while Julie De Fina was executive producer. The series was created by De Fina and Bate; it was written by De Fina, Bate and Matt Vesely. The executive producer for the ABC was Rebecca Anderson.

Jonathan Brough, who directed Rosehaven and The Family Law, directed the first season of the series.

In November 2021 it was announced that a second series had been commissioned by the ABC, which was being filmed in early 2022, directed by Renée Webster. Filming was completed in March.

While season one centred on the small town of Uraidla, east of the city of Adelaide, and was filmed on location around there, the second series was filmed in a more southerly part of the Adelaide Hills, between Kangarilla and Meadows.

== Release ==
The series first premiered on 3 February 2021 on the ABC TV channel.

The second season of the series went air on 20 July 2022.

=== Worldwide distribution ===
ABC Commercial has international distribution rights, and in February 2022 sold the first series to US streaming service Acorn TV, for release in the US, UK, Ireland, Netherlands, Spain, Portugal, and Canada. Season 1 is also available in French and Spanish.

== Reception ==
In a review of the first two episodes, The Guardian called it a "sharp satire" that's "smart, dynamic and laugh-out-loud funny". Broadsheet called it a "very, very funny show", which incorporates important themes while remaining "delightfully silly and vulgar television". Graeme Blundell, in The Australian, called the writing "polished and witty", the direction achieving "the right density of texture and atmosphere", and especially praised newcomer Abbott's performance.

== Accolades ==
=== Series 1 ===
- 2021: Nominated, 11th AACTA Awards in the AACTA Award for Best Narrative Comedy Series category
- 2021: Nominated, ADG Award for Jonathon Brough, for Best Direction in a TV or SVOD Comedy Program episode, s1 e1
- 2021: Nominated, s1 e5, for the Australian Screen Sound Awards, in the Best Sound for a Drama or Comedy (Under 30 minutes) category
- 2021: Nominated, 54th AWGIE Awards for Best Screenplay, Comedy – Situation or Narrative for Matthew Bate for "The Beauty and the Terroir"

=== Series 2 ===
- 2022: Nominated for the 12th AACTA Awards in the AACTA Award for Best Television Comedy Series category
- 2023: Nominated, Outstanding Performance by an Ensemble in a Comedy Series, in the Equity Ensemble Awards
- 2022: Nominated, Logie Awards of 2022, Logie Award for Most Popular Comedy Program
