= Matt Vesely =

Australian filmmaker

- Born: Matthew Vesely
- Occupation: Filmmaker
- Years active: 2009–
- Notable work: Monolith (2022)

Matthew Vesely is an Australian filmmaker, best known for his 2022 feature film Monolith. His other work includes the web series Wastelander Panda (2013) and the short films My Best Friend Is Stuck on the Ceiling (2015) and System Error (2020). He works as development manager at Closer Productions. He has also performed some small acting roles, and at least once performed as a stand-up comic.

== Early life and education ==
Matthew Vesely grew up in Adelaide, South Australia.

For high school, he attended Scotch College in Adelaide, graduating in 2004. He graduated from Flinders University with a Bachelor in Creative Arts in 2007.

== Career ==
Vesely's career started with making a number of low-budget short films, including the comedy Better Late Than Never, the documentary Street's Press, and the 2009 drama A Load Of Buckshot. In 2009, He took part in the South Australian Film Corporation's inaugural FilmLab Development Workshop. His short film The Thing About Dolphins, produced under the auspices of FilmLab, screened at the Adelaide Film Festival in 2011 and was nominated for four South Australian Screen Awards. The 18-minute film was also screened at other short film festivals in Australia as well as at Raindance Film Festival in London.

In 2013, he was part of the writing team for the post-apocalyptic sci-fi web series Wastelander Panda (with Victoria Cocks and Mike Jones), which was produced by Kirsty Stark and produced by Epic Films in Adelaide. The series reached a global audience, was featured on the front page of BuzzFeed, io9, Gizmodo, and Neatorama, and invited comparisons with Mad Max, The Road and The Book of Eli. After being posted online, within three days the series was viewed over 100,000 times in 150 countries. The project was then given federal funding for a six-part online series.

He has worked with Closer Productions for many years, for some years in the role of development manager, alongside company co-founder and owner Sophie Hyde and producer Rebecca Summerton. Hyde co-produced his 2015 short film My Best Friend Is Stuck on the Ceiling, which starred Tom Ward and Erin James, and the voice of Canadian comedian Nick Nemeroff. Written, directed, and co-edited by Vesely, the film premiered at the Adelaide Film Festival in 2015, had its international premiere at Palm Springs International ShortFest, and was also screened at the Melbourne, Sydney, Flickerfest, and St Kilda Film Festivals, touring for 18 months in all. It was released on a streaming service on 22 October 2019. The film became publicly available on YouTube after it was selected by the "Short of the Week" channel on 11 May 2020.

Also through Closer, Vesely was a writer and script producer on the 2017 TV series F*!#ing Adelaide, which starred Pamela Rabe, Tilda Cobham-Hervey, and Kate Box, and screened at the Adelaide Film Festival and on ABC Television. He was also script producer on the 2019 SBS Television drama series The Hunting, starring Asher Keddie and Richard Roxburgh.

Vesely has also worked as a writer and clip producer on the ABC comedy series The Weekly with Charlie Pickering.

His 2020 short film, System Error, featured David Quirk as Sid, Nick Nemeroff (as the voice of George the Robot), and Vesely as George the Human. The film was selected for the 2020 Tribeca Film Festival, and opened the 2021 St Kilda Film Festival in Melbourne. It premiered in the UK at the Aesthetica Film Festival on 3 November 2020. It was hosted by DUST, which made it available on their YouTube channel in March 2021. Vesely described System Error as "a sort of pilot for a series we're working on called Overheater, which is a dystopian romantic comedy about a love triangle between an anxious young woman, a reckless man with a deathwish, and... George". The film deals with mental illness and friendship, and "being okay with being broken".

Vesely's first feature film, the sci-fi thriller Monolith, featuring a single on-screen actor, Lily Sullivan, was selected to have its international premiere at SXSW in 2023, after a screening at the 2022 Adelaide Film Festival. It also screened at Bucheon International Fantastic Film Festival and Sitges Film Festival. It was well-reviewed by respected Australian film critic David Stratton, as well as in The New York Times, The Guardian, and by other reviewers. It was released in cinemas in the Australia and New Zealand in 2023, and the US in 2024. Vesely was interviewed on RogerEbert.com about the film ahead of the US release.

He has been working with Garth Davis and See-Saw Films as a screenwriter on a TV adaptation of French graphic novel by Léo Quievreux published in English as The Immersion Program. In April 2022, Screen Australia announced funding the science fiction drama TV series Immersion, to be written by Vesely, directed by Davis, and executive produced by Emile Sherman and Samantha Lang.

As of February 2024 he was also working on developing another film with his Monolith team (Lucy Campbell, writer, and Bettina Hamilton, producer), and a solo project, writing a script for a "kind of Lovecraftian cult film". The trio were featured in an article entitled "Behind the screens: Meet 14 next generation South Australian filmmakers" in The Advertiser in December 2024, saying that the South Australian screen industry had increased its activity to a level not seen since the 1970s.

== Other activities ==
Vesely has also performed as a stand-up comic. In 2019, he performed a show at the Adelaide Film Festival, called "Matt Vesely and George The Robot Perform a Very Normal Stand Up Comedy Routine", which won good reviews.

In 2020, he appeared in minor role in the feature film A Sunburnt Christmas.

He wrote an essay about the technical and other aspects of working with an inanimate object in a film, based on his experiences with System Error, for the filmmaking website No Film School.

Vesely was one of three judges on the Shorts Award Jury in the 2025 Adelaide Film Festival, with Manda Flett and Isaac Coen Lindsay.

== Accolades ==
- 2012: Winner, Best Music Video, SA Screen Awards
- 2014: Colin Thiele Scholarship for Creative Writing, which he used on a project called Catharsis, a series of 52 short stories, published weekly
- 2016: Winner, Best Comedy and Best Screenplay, South Australian Screen Awards, for My Best Friend Is Stuck on the Ceiling
- 2016: Nominated, the Dendy Award for Best Australian Short at the Sydney Film Festival, for My Best Friend Is Stuck on the Ceiling
- 2016: Special Mention, Short Screenplay Award, at the Sydney Film Festival, for My Best Friend Is Stuck on the Ceiling
- 2017: Winner, Best Screenplay, Heart of Gold Film Festival, for My Best Friend Is Stuck on the Ceiling
- 2018: Script for a feature film, Overheater, shortlisted for Australian Writers' Guild's John Hinde Award
- 2023: Monolith was one of four nominees for the CinefestOZ Film Prize, the richest film prize in the country and worth A$100,000
- 2023: Listed on IF Magazine's "Rising Talent list" (sponsored by AFTRS)
- 2023: Nominated, ADG Awards, "Best Direction in a Debut Feature Film" category
- 2024: Nominated, AACTA Award for Best Indie Film (Monolith)
- 2024: Recipient (along with Aaron Fa'aoso and four others) of the Talent Gateway program, a joint initiative of Screen Australia and Australians in Film, which aims to help emerging filmmakers to develop their skills and forge connections, in order to succeed further in the international market
- 2024: One of ten filmmakers selected for the "Adelaide Film Festival goes to Cannes" initiative
- 2024: Winner, Best Feature Film in the SA Screen Awards (Monolith)
