= Shabana Azeez =

Australian actress (born 1997)

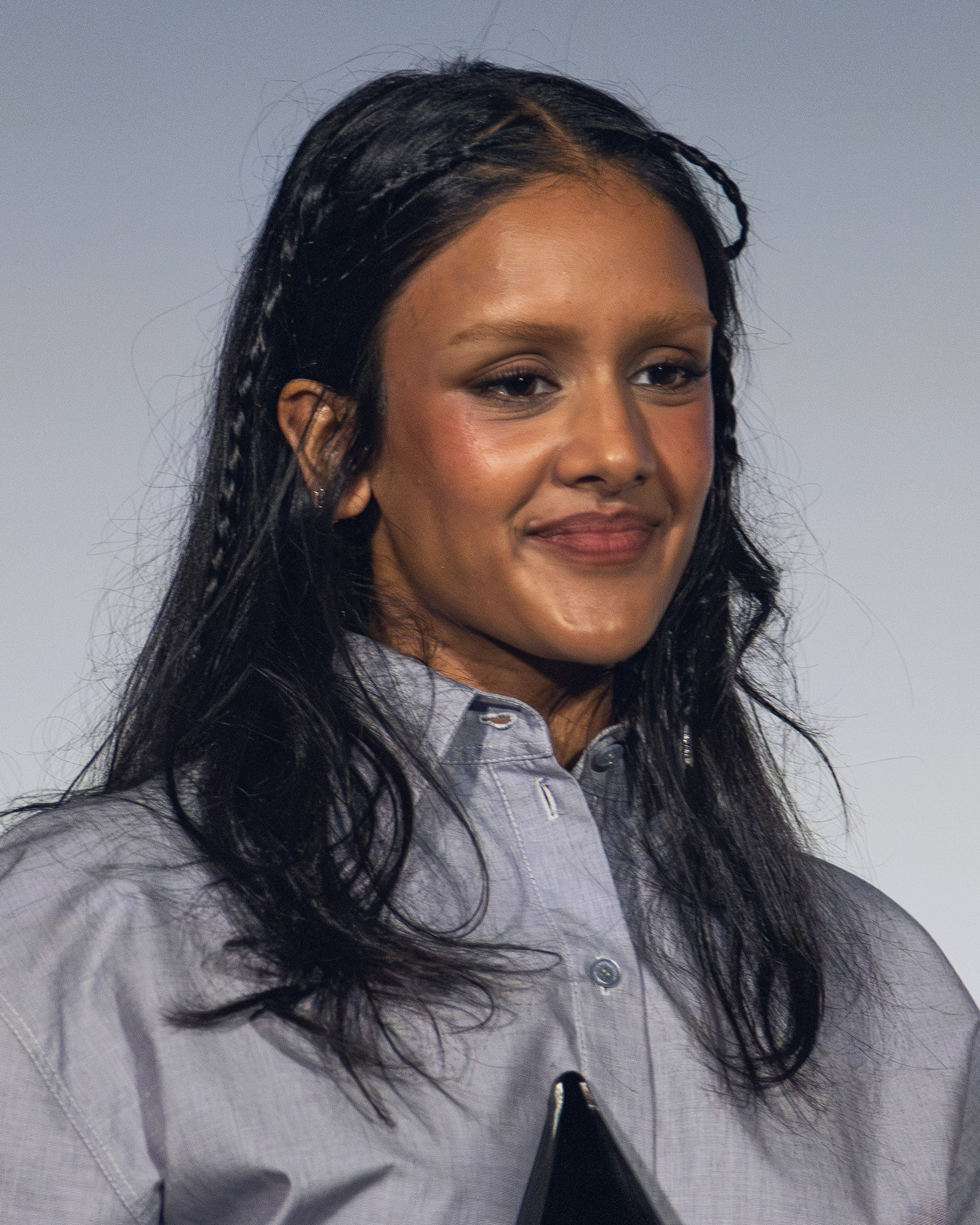
- Azeez in 2026
- Born: March 9, 1997 (age 29); Adelaide, South Australia, Australia
- Education: University of Adelaide (BA)
- Occupation: Actress
- Known for: The Pitt; Birdeater; Metro Sexual; Lesbian Space Princess

Shabana Azeez (born 9 March 1997) is an Australian actress. She has starred in many Australian films and TV series, including the 2023 film Birdeater, and became known internationally for her role as medical student Victoria Javadi on the HBO Max medical drama The Pitt (2025–present).

== Early life and education ==
Shabana Azeez was born on 9 March 1997 in Adelaide, South Australia to Indo-Fijian parents. She has a younger brother. She was educated at St Aloysius College, an all-girls Catholic school in Adelaide, from 2002 until 2014, where she was a member of the senior debating team and the choir.

Azeez was raised in a household that emphasised the importance of academics. At the end of Year 12, she gained her parents' permission to audition for one drama school; she crashed her car on the way to the audition, which was not successful.

She undertook a Bachelor of Arts and Media double degree at the University of Adelaide.

== Career ==
While working in an administrative position at Mercury CX, Azeez's boss secured her an audition for a short film, which she successfully booked. During this time, she met Leela Varghese and Emma Hough Hobbs, with whom she would later collaborate repeatedly. Azeez also appeared in a comedy band with Varghese called The Coconuts. Between acting jobs, Azeez worked as a standardised patient.

Azeez's breakout role was in the 2023 film Birdeater as Irene, who goes on a disastrous bachelor party weekend with her fiancé. She researched testimonies of emotional abuse and coercive control in advance of filming. Critics praised Azeez for her performance and her on-screen chemistry with co-star Mackenzie Fearnley. Azeez secured her management after Birdeater was shown at South by Southwest in Texas.

In July 2024, it was announced that Azeez had joined the cast of the upcoming HBO Max medical drama The Pitt. Azeez auditioned for The Pitt with a self-taped audition and a subsequent nine-minute-long Zoom call; initially, she did not think she had secured the role. Azeez's character Victoria Javadi (an intelligent young medical student who struggles socially) was not originally written as South Asian, and Azeez also feared her race would negatively impact her success of booking the role. "I remember thinking that it would never happen because they already had a 'brown girl'," she stated, referring to Supriya Ganesh, who played Dr. Samira Mohan. Azeez and Ganesh later became close friends after Azeez moved to Los Angeles for filming.

Azeez prepared for the role of Victoria Javadi by watching American teen dramas and reading romance novels (including those by Emily Henry), as well as poring over studies about loneliness. She also learned about gun violence in advance of the first season's mass shooting subplot. With her Pitt co-stars Gerran Howell and Isa Briones, she participated in a "two-week boot camp" where she learned how to perform medical procedures. Before filming season two, she researched post-traumatic stress disorder and toured hospitals and medical schools, interviewing medical students as she did so.

Azeez provided the voice of Princess Saira in the critically acclaimed comedy Lesbian Space Princess. She had previously auditioned for the role of Willow. Writing for The Guardian, Cassie Tongue described Azeez as "the perfect lead" for the film, while Stephen A Russel for ScreenHub said she was "instantly endearing" in the role".

Azeez stars alongside Hugo Weaving in the 2026 SBS series The Airport Chaplain. She plays a single mother named Mira who works in a management role at an airport. Azeez interviewed real airport workers to learn about working in that environment.

In July 2026, it was announced that Azeez will star in Unrequited, directed by Lynn Q. Yu.

== Filmography ==
=== Film ===
Year	Title	Role	Notes
2020	Aquaphobe	Miriam	Short film
2020	The Normals	Beth-Anne	Short film
2021	Weather Girl	Molly	Short film
2022	Illustrating Sam Newton	Charlie	Short film
2023	Run Rabbit Run	Nowa	
2023	Birdeater	Irene	
2025	I'm the Most Racist Person I Know	Lali	Short film
2025	Lesbian Space Princess	Saira	Voice role

=== Television ===
Year	Title	Role	Notes
2018	F Off We're Full	Fatima	TV movie
2019	The Letdown	Hipster Waitress	Episode: "Heavy Heart"
2019	The Hunting	Jaspreet	Episode: "sluts"
2020	Love, Guns & Level Ups	Steph	Mini series; 2 episodes
2021	Why Are You Like This	Samara	2 episodes
2021	Metro Sexual	Yasmin Dagher	6 episodes
2023	Utopia	Carla	Episode: "Tunnel Vision"
2023	In Limbo	Jay	6 episodes
2024	Nautilus	Renouka	3 episodes
2024	Triple Oh!	Brooklyn	Episode: "Car Crash"
2024	Urvi Went to an All Girls School	Maya	Episode: "Urvi Went to an All Girls School"
2024	Westerners	Tasneem	Episode: "Second Hand Lamp"
2025–present	The Pitt	Victoria Javadi	30 episodes
2025	Apple Cider Vinegar	Evie	Episode: "Tapeworm"
2026	The Airport Chaplain	Mira Ansari-Cole	8 episodes
2026	Guy Montgomery's Guy Mont-Spelling Bee (AU)	Herself	Season 3, episode 2

== Awards and honors ==
Year	Award	Category	Work	Result	Ref.
2026	Actor Awards	Outstanding Performance by an Ensemble in a Drama Series	The Pitt	Won	
