= Kavitha Anandasivam =

Sri Lankan Australian actress

- Born: 3 July 2002 (age 24); Colombo, Sri Lanka
- Occupation: Actress

Kavitha Anandasivam (born 3 July 2002) is a Sri Lankan Australian actress. She is known for starring in the 2019 teen drama miniseries The Hunting, and in the 2021 comedy series Aftertaste.

== Early life and education ==
Kavitha Anandasivam was born on 3 July 2002 in Colombo, Sri Lanka. She spent some time in Singapore as a child, before settling in Adelaide, South Australia, with her family around 2011.

== Career ==
In 2019 Anandasivam starred in the mini-series The Hunting on SBS Television, alongside Asher Keddie.

In 2021 she appeared in the ABC Television comedy series Aftertaste.

In 2026 she stars in the SBS / Netflix series The Airport Chaplain, alongside Hugo Weaving, Shabana Azeez, and Claudia Karvan.

== Awards and honors ==
In 2019, the Casting Guild of Australia named Anandasivam among their 10 "Rising Stars" to watch.

== Filmography ==
=== Film ===
Year	Title	Role	Notes	Ref.
2020	The Normals	Rafferty	Short film	
2020	Everything ALL AT ONCE	Elise	Short film	
2025	I'm the Most Racist Person I Know	Ana	Short film	
2025	Guts	Sidney	Short film	

=== Television ===
Year	Title	Role	Notes	Ref.
2019	The Hunting	Amandip 'Dip'		
2021	Aftertaste	Nayani		
2022	The Tourist	Constable Peters		
2026	The Airport Chaplain	Asha Chawla		
