= 54th AWGIE Awards =

Award ceremony for writing of 2021

The 54th annual AWGIE Awards, presented by the Australian Writers' Guild, took place on 7 December 2021. It honoured the best writing in film, television, audio, stage, web series, and gaming of 2021. The nominations were announced on 26 October 2021.

== Winners and nominees ==
Winners are listed first and highlighted in boldface.

**Major AWGIE Award**
- **Cursed! – Kodie Bedford**

=== Film ===
**Feature Film – Original**
- **Nitram – Shaun Grant**
  - Falling for Figaro – Ben Lewin with Allen Palmer
  - The Furnace – Roderick MacKay
  - Here Out West – Nisrine Amine, Bina Bhattacharya, Matias Bolla, Claire Cao, Arka Das, Dee Duygu Dogan, Vonne Patiag, and Tien Tran
**Feature Film – Adapted**
- **The Dry – Robert Connolly and Harry Cripps; based on the novel by Jane Harper**
  - Babyteeth – Rita Kalnejais; based on her play
**Short Film**
- **The Last Elephant on Earth – Piri Eddy**
  - Ayaan – Alies Sluiter
  - The Moogai – Jon Bell

=== Documentary ===
**Documentary – Public Broadcast (Including VOD) or Exhibition**
- **Ablaze – Alec Morgan with Tiriki Onus**
  - Firestarter – Nel Minchin and Wayne Blair
  - Playing With Sharks – Sally Aitken
  - The Skin of Others – Tom Murray
**Documentary – Community, Educational, and Training (Or Otherwise Commissioned to a Specific Brief)**
- **Water Safety with Kangaroo Beach – Tim Bain**
  - The Case for Group Work: Students Give Their Verdict – George Catsi with Ari Kwasner-Catsi and Zac Perry
  - Small Changes – Peter Flynn

=== Television ===
**Television – Serial**
- **Neighbours: Episode 8367 – Peter Mattessi (10 Peach)**
  - Home and Away: Episode 7433 – Andrew Gardner (Seven Network)
  - Neighbours: Episode 8328 – Jessica Paine (10 Peach)
  - Neighbours: Episode 8498 – Jason Herbison (10 Peach)
**Television – Series or Miniseries (More than 4 Hours Duration)**
- **The Great: "The Beaver's Nose" – Tony McNamara (Hulu)**
  - Five Bedrooms: "Twenty-Seven Weeks" – Michael Lucas with Christine Bartlett (Network 10)
  - The Great: "A Pox on Hope" – Tony McNamara and Gretel Vella (Hulu)
  - Wakefield: "Episode 5" – Sam Meikle (ABC)
  - Wentworth: "The Unknown Terrorist" – Kim Wilson (Fox Showcase)
**Television – Telemovie or Miniseries (4 Hours or Less Duration)**
- **New Gold Mountain – Peter Cox, Yolanda Ramke, Benjamin Law, Greg Waters, and Pip Karmel (SBS)**
  - A Sunburnt Christmas – Elliot Vella, Gretel Vella, and Timothy Walker (Stan)
**Comedy – Situation or Narrative**
- **Why Are You Like This: "The Pressures of Late Capitalism" – Mark Bonanno, Naomi Higgins, and Humyara Mahbub (ABC)**
  - Aftertaste: "The Beauty and the Terroir" – Matthew Bate (ABC)
  - Fisk: "Portrait of a Lady" – Penny Flanagan with Kitty Flanagan (ABC)
  - Retrograde: "Episode 3" – Declan Fay (ABC)
**Comedy – Sketch or Light Entertainment**
- **The Feed: "Comedy Sketches, 2020" – Ben Jenkins, Alex Lee, Jenna Owen, and Victoria Zerbst (SBS)**
  - Gruen: "Tools and Boots for Tools" – James Colley and Sophie Braham (ABC)
  - Reputation Rehab: "Nick Kyrgios – The Bad Boy of Tennis" – Sophie Braham with Kirsten Drysdale, Zoe Norton Lodge, and Melina Wicks (ABC)

=== Children's Television ===
**Children's Television – 'P' Classification (Preschool – Under 5 Years)**
- **Pocoyo: "The Remote Control" – Lina Foti (ABC Kids)**
  - Kangaroo Beach: "The Shark Prank" – Simon Dodd and Tristan Dodd (ABC Kids)
  - The Wonder Gang – Wendy Hanna (ABC Kids)
**Children's Television – 'C' Classification (Children's – 5-14 Years)**
- **The Gamers 2037: "The Decision" – Hannah Fitzpatrick (9Go!)**
  - Hardball: "Matariki" – Amy Stewart (ABC Me)
  - The Strange Chores: "Unmask a Shapeshifter" – John McGeachin (ABC Me)
  - The Strange Chores: "Wear a Mech Suit" – Luke Tierney (ABC Me)

=== Stage ===
**Stage**
- **Cursed! – Kodie Bedford**
  - Hecate – Kylie Bracknell [Kaarljilba Kaardn] with Clint Bracknell
  - Sunshine Super Girl: The Evonne Goolagong Story – Andrea James
  - Wonnangatta – Angus Cerini
**Community and Youth Theatre**
- **Trackers – Donna Hughes**
**Music Theatre**
- **Notre-Dame – Alana Valentine**
**Theatre for Young Audience**
- **Claire Della and the Moon – Jamie Hornsby with Ellen Graham**
  - Magic Beach – Finegan Kruckemeyer

=== Other categories ===
**Animation**
- **Space Nova: "Seaweed Samba" – John Armstrong (9Go!)**
  - Space Nova: "Pamela Barnacle is Alive and Well" – Melanie Alexander (9Go!)
**Audio**
- **CrossBread: "In the Beginning" – Declan Fay with Chris Ryan and Megan Washington**
  - Performing the Past: "1919" – Kate Rice
  - The Right Fit: Episodes 1-4 – Ross Mueller
**Web Series and Other Non-Broadcast/Non-'Subscription Video on Demand' TV Short Works**
- **Ding Dong I'm Gay: "Easier Said Than Cum" – Tim Spencer and Zoe Norton Lodge**
- **The Tailings: "Episode 5" and "Episode 6" – Caitlin Richardson**
  - Love Bug – Imogen McCluskey

=== Special awards ===
The following special awards were presented at the ceremony:

- David Williamson Prize for Excellence in Writing for Australian Theatre: Claire Della and the Moon – Jamie Hornsby with Ellen Graham
- Australian Writers' Guild Life Membership: Rob George
- Australian Writers' Guild Lifetime Achievement Award: Roger Simpson
- Richard Lane Award for Outstanding Service and Dedication to the Australian Writers Guild: Jacqueline Elaine
- Dorothy Crawford Award for Outstanding Contribution to the Profession and the Industry: Wesley Enoch
- Fred Parsons Award for Outstanding Contribution to Australian Comedy: Tim Minchin
