= Gideon Obarzanek =

Australian dancer (born 1966)

Gideon Obarzanek (born 1966) is an Australian choreographer, director, and performing arts curator, and founder of the dance company Chunky Move.

== Early life and education ==
Gideon Obarzanek was born 1966 in Melbourne, Australia.

He spent his early childhood in Israel on an agricultural kibbutz. His family returned to Melbourne where he went to the Australian Ballet School, graduating in 1987.

== Career ==
=== Chunky Moves ===
Obarzanek founded dance company Chunky Move in 1995 and was CEO and artistic director until 2012. His works for Chunky Move have included stage productions, installations, site-specific works participatory events, and film. These have been performed in many festivals and theatres around the world, including Edinburgh International, BAM, Next Wave NY, Venice Biennale, Southbank London, and all major Australian performing arts festivals.

He choreographed I Want to Dance Better at Parties in 2004 for Chunky Move.

=== Other work ===
As associate artist at the Sydney Theatre Company in 2012, Obarzanek wrote and directed the stage play Dance Better at Parties. In 2013 he was awarded an Australia Council Fellowship to further research with other film, dance and theatre makers, new works to be simultaneously created for both stage and screen.

Also in 2012, he co-wrote and co-directed the documentary drama film I Want to Dance Better at Parties with filmmaker Matthew Bate, which won the 2014 Sydney Film Festival's Dendy Award for best short film. The film was produced by Rebecca Summerton.

He was artistic associate with the Melbourne Festival (2015–2017), co-curator and director of "XO State" at the inaugural Asia-Pacific Triennial of Performing Arts (Asia TOPA) (2015–2017). Obarzanek was appointed chair of the Melbourne Fringe Festival in 2015 and strategic cultural engagement manager at chancellery at the University of Melbourne in 2018. He then danced with the Queensland Ballet and later joined the Sydney Dance Company, before pursuing a career as a performer and choreographer with various dance companies and independent projects within Australia and abroad. In his early career period he worked with The Australian Ballet, Sydney Dance Company, Opera Australia and the Netherlands Dance Theatre.

== Recognition and awards ==
- 2017: Helpmann Award, Best Dance Production, for Attractor
- 2017: Helpmann Award Best Choreography in a Ballet, Dance or Physical Theatre Production for Attractor
- 2014: Sydney Film Festival Dendy Award for best short film for I Want to Dance Better at Parties
- 2013: Australia Council Fellowship
- 2008 Helpmann Award best new work for Mortal Engine
- 2008: Helpmann Award for Glow, Best Ballet or Dance Work
- Dance Like Your Old Man a film co-directed with Edwina Throsby won best short documentary at the 2007 Melbourne International Film Festival
- 2005: Bessie Award, with Lucy Guerin and Michael Kantor, for outstanding choreography and creation for Chunky Move's production of Tense Dave.
- 2004: Melbourne Green Room Awards for best concept and choreography for I Want to Dance Better at Parties
- 1999: Mo Award for best choreography for Bonehead
- 1996: Prime Minister's Young Creative Fellowship
- 1997: Inaugural Australian Dance Award for outstanding achievement in choreography
- 1989: Mr Crowther and the Wallflower (1989 film), Queensland Young Filmmakers Award

== Works since 2012 ==
- Bangsokol – A Requim for Cambodia. Staging Director. Commissioned by Cambodian Living Arts and produced by The Office. Premier BAM Next Wave NYC 2017.
- Attractor. Dance/music performance. Co-director and choreographer. Produced by Dancenorth Australia, Lucy Guerin Inc. Asia TOPA, WOMADelaide, Brisbane Festival. Premier Asia TOPA 2017.
- Once Upon a Time in the Western Suburbs. VR film. Co-writer and director. Commissioned by Art Centre Melbourne and Closer Productions. Premiere 2017.
- Two Jews walk into a theatre... Play. Co-writer and performer. Produced by Arthouse Melbourne. Premier Arthouse Melbourne 2016.
- Stuck In The Middle With You. VR film. Co-writer and director. Produced by ACMI (Australian Centre for the Moving Image) and Closer Productions. Premiere 2016.
- L'Chaim. Director and choreographer. Produced and performed by Sydney Dance Company. Premier 2014.
- I Want to Dance Better at Parties. Docudrama film. Co-writer and co-director (with Matthew Bate). Produced by Closer Productions, Adelaide Film Festival, and ABC TV. Premiere 2013.
- I want to Dance Better at Parties. Play. Writer and director. Produced and presented by Sydney Theatre Company. Premiere 2013.
- There's Definitely a Prince Involved. Ballet. Director and choreographer. The Australian Ballet. Premiere 2012.
