= Ling Cooper Tang =

Chinese Australian actress

- Other name: Ling-Hsueh Tang
- Education: Queensland University of Technology (1995)
- Occupation: Actress
- Years active: 1995–present
- Known for: All Saints; Ghost Rider; Son of the Mask; Troppo

Ling Cooper Tang, formerly credited as Ling-Hsueh Tang, is a Chinese Australian actress. She became known for her role as Dr. Kylie Preece in the hospital drama TV series All Saints (1999-2002), and has starred in many TV series since, including the 2024 British adventure series Nautilus, as well as several films.

== Early life and education ==
Ling-Hsueh Tang studied acting at the Queensland University of Technology's Academy of the Arts, graduating with a Bachelor of Arts (Drama) 1995.

== Career ==
Tang has been credited as Ling Cooper Tang since around 2016, according to IMDb.

According to a 2002 report by the Australian Film Commission, Tang is considered a breakthrough actress given her racial background. She has been cast in several non ethnic-specific roles for mainstream shows, which is considered unusual for Australian broadcast television.

=== Television ===
In 1998 Tang appeared in Breakers. She became known for her role as Dr. Kylie Preece on All Saints, an Australian hospital drama, which she played from 1999 to 2002. In 2001 she appeared on the cover of TV Week to promote the series.

In 2002, Tang presented the ABC Television children's program, Play School.

She played Mei Lin in series 4 of The Doctor Blake Mysteries (2016), and Dang, a brothel madam, in Top of the Lake: China Girl (2017).

Tang has also appeared in Fireflies, Children's Hospital, Sea Patrol and the miniseries Tribe.

Tang appeared in both seasons of ABC series Troppo, in 2022 and 2024.

On 13 September 2024, Tang was named as part of the extended cast for series two of crime drama Deadloch, which was released on 21 March 2026.

In 2026 she stars in the ABC crime drama series Dustfall.

=== Film ===
Tang has appeared in several films, including Son of the Mask, Strange Planet, and Ghost Rider.

In 2020, she played Fiona Raley in the Stan comedy A Sunburnt Christmas, directed by Christiaan Van Vuuren. In 2022 she played the voice of Floramae in the sci-fi drama Monolith, directed by Matt Vesely.

=== Stage ===
In 2003, Tang played Chan, a young textile design student who wants to drop a charge of rape, in the Griffin Theatre Company production Songket, at Sydney Opera House. Darren Yap played the perpetrator, while Marta Dusseldorp plays an anthropologist.

She has also appeared in productions by La Boite, Living Room Theatre, and Moor Productions.

== Awards ==
Year	Title	Award	Category	Result
2009	The Ghost Writer	Matilda Award	Best Actress in a Lead Role	Nominated

== Filmography ==
=== Television ===
Year	Title	Role	Notes	Ref
2026	Dustfall	Bernadette Quinn	TV series	
2026	Deadloch	Lynn	TV series, 6 episodes	
2024	Nautilus	Suyin	10 episodes	
2022–24	Troppo	Sergeant Carrie Hench	15 episodes	
2024	Exposure	Suzanna	2 episodes	
2024	Apples Never Fall	Sulin Hope	Miniseries, 3 episodes	
2022	Darby and Joan	Cinta	1 episode	
2022	Mystery Road: Origin	Poppy	2 episodes	
2022	Pieces of Her	US Marshall	1 episode	
2021	The Dog Days of Christmas	Stacy	TV movie	
2019–20	Reckoning	Principal Taft	2 episodes	
2020	The Secrets She Keeps	Jocelyn	4 episodes	
2020	The End	Lucy Roositer	3 episodes	
2020	The Gloaming	Lena Madison	1 episode	
2019	SeaChange	Clara Russo	2 episodes	
2019	Harrow	Sally Peterson	1 episode	
2019	Ms Fisher's Modern Murder Mysteries	Lucy Harrington	1 episode	
2018	Fighting Season	Diana Lau	Miniseries, 2 episodes	
2018	Doctor Doctor	Sophie	1 episode	
2018	Dead Lucky	Margaret	Miniseries, 1 episode	
2017	The Other Guy	Sam's Mum	1 episode	
2017	Top of the Lake	Dang	5 episodes	
2016	The Doctor Blake Mysteries	Mei Lin Blake	Season 4, 6 episodes	
2016	The Family Law	Auny Rose	1 episode	
2015	Hiding	Irene	Miniseries, 1 episode	
2008–09	Sea Patrol	Xiao-Xiao	2 episodes	
2004	Fireflies	KC	4 episodes	
2004	Go Big	Lisa	TV movie	
1999-02	All Saints	Kylie Preece / Barbara Chan	89 episodes	
2000	Murder Call	Emma	1 episode	
1999	Tribe	Minh Tam	Miniseries, 4 episodes	
1998–99	Breakers	Maggie	TV series	
1997	Children's Hospital	Tina	TV series	
1997	Fallen Angels	Rose	1 episode	
1997	Big Sky	Clarie	1 episode	

=== Film ===
Year	Title	Role	Notes
2023	True Spirit	Susie	Feature film
2022	Monolith	Floramae	Feature film
2022	Ticket to Paradise	Auctioneer	Feature film
2021	The Moths Will Eat Them Up	Rayne	Short film
2020	A Sunburnt Christmas	Fiona Raley	Feature film
2020	Never Too Late	Kate	Feature film
2019	Girl and Body	Dr Gibson	Short film
2019	Heart and Bones	Ruth	Feature film
2007	Ghost Rider	News Reader	Feature film
2005	Son of the Mask	Animator	Feature film
1999	Strange Planet	Verna	Feature film

== Theatre ==
Year	Title	Role	Notes
1995	Capricornia		Cremorne Theatre, Brisbane with QUT
2003	Songket	Chan	Sydney Opera House with Griffin Theatre Company
2005	Amigos	Sophie	La Boite Theatre
2007	Beautiful	The Woman	The Loft, Kelvin Grove (QUT), with And Moore Productions
2008	The Ghost Writer	Claudia	And Moore Productions
