= Elena Carapetis =

Australian actress and writer

- Born: Whyalla, South Australia
- Occupation: Actor
- Years active: 1987–present

Elena Carapetis is an Australian actress and writer based in Adelaide, South Australia. She is best known for her role as Jackie Kassis in Heartbreak High, as well as numerous other television series and theatre roles. As a writer, her plays and screenplays often feature the experience of Greek migrants to Australia, as well as Greek mythology and feminist themes.

== Early life and education ==
Elena Carapatis was born in Whyalla, South Australia. She spent some years in Port Pirie as a child, before the family moved to Adelaide. Her maternal grandparents were Greek Cypriot migrants to Australia, with her mother arriving at the age of 11. Her father is of Greek Australian descent, with his forebears having migrated around the 1910s, having origins in Ikaria, Kastellorizo, and Levissi. She grew up with a large extended family, and worked in her family's restaurant when she was 12. She remained especially close to her brother Jon.

She started ballet lessons when she was around four years old on the recommendation of a doctor, to help her flat feet. She went on stage for the first time as a ballerina in a "chorus of baby chicks", in a performance of Peter and the Wolf in Port Pirie Town Hall.

She graduated from Australia's National Institute of Dramatic Art (NIDA) in Sydney with a Bachelor of Dramatic (Acting) in 1996.

== Acting career ==
Returning to Adelaide after graduation, Carapetis was employed by the State Theatre Company of South Australia (STCSA) and also by both the Adelaide College of the Arts and Flinders University as a lecturer.

=== Stage ===
Carapetis has appeared onstage in numerous productions. Apart from STCSA, she has worked for many well-known Australian theatre companies, including Bell Shakespeare, Windmill Theatre, Sydney Theatre Company, Vitalstatistix, Brink Productions, Malthouse Theatre, and Belvoir.

Her first public performance was in Tonight We Improvise at the University of Adelaide's Little Theatre on 10 June 1987. This was followed by appearances in Dogg's Hamlet, Cahoot's Macbeth, also at the Little Theatre, in 1988.

In 1990, she appeared in The Courtyard of Miracles at the Lion Theatre, Adelaide.

In 1993, Carapetis performed in As You Like It at the Little Theatre, Adelaide.

In 1997, she appeared in Features of Blown Youth at the Queens Theatre, Adelaide.

In 2002, she performed in Parthenon Air at the Sidetrack Theatre, Marrickville, Sydney.

In 2004, Carapetis appeared in a production of Translations and Hot Fudge with the State Theatre Company of South Australia.

In March 2005, Carapetis first performed in It's A Mother! at the Sidetrack Theatre, Marrickville, as part of the Greek Festival of Sydney. She would return to this show in 2006 as part of the Melbourne International Comedy Festival and in 2007 as part of Melbourne's Arts House program.

In 2006, Carapetis again performed in Translations, this time at the Malthouse Theatre, Melbourne and the Beckett Theatre, Southbank. In the same year, she appeared in 4:48 Psychosis at The Queens Theatre Stables, Adelaide.

In 2007, Carapetis played in Assassins, Triple Threat, and This Uncharted Hour.

In 2008, she appeared in Helly's Magic Cup at The Space, Adelaide.

In 2009, she appeared in The Things We Do For Love at the Dunstan Playhouse.

In 2010, Carapetis performed in Ruby Bruise at the Waterside Theatre, Port Adelaide.

In 2011, appeared in transumer: deviate from the norm at the Waterside Hall, Port Adelaide.

In 2012, she played all "the other roles" in the play Truck Stop, including a doctor, counsellor, mother, and grungy teenage boy.

She played one of the lead roles in Theatre Republic's The Bleeding Tree, which was first staged at Tandanya in 2020, and again in 2022, after the hiatus caused by the COVID-19 pandemic in South Australia, at the Space Theatre.

=== Films and TV ===
Carapetis has acted in several feature films, including Look Both Ways (2005) and Bad Blood (2017). She featured in a small but effective role in the 2009 Adelaide film Offside.

She is also known for her work in television series, including Heartbreak High (1998–1999), All Saints (2000–2009), and The Hunting (2019). The Hunting won the award for Outstanding Performance by an Ensemble in a Mini-Series/Telemovie in the 10th annual Equity Ensemble Awards in 2020. She also appeared in the first series of Aftertaste (ep.4, February 2021), as Vassiliki.

=== Voice ===
She has worked extensively as a voice-over artist on advertising campaigns, including for Commonwealth Bank, Sunday Mail, and Stone's Ginger Beer, and for corporate videos.

== Writing ==
Carapetis cites American playwright Arthur Miller as the writer who has influenced her most in her writing.

=== Stage plays ===
Carapetis wrote the stage play Helen Back in 2011, which is about "the commodification of beauty and the pressure on women to remain beautiful and youthful". The play made the shortlist for the Jill Blewett Playwright's Award at the 2012 Adelaide Festival Awards and was performed in Adelaide and Melbourne.

Her play The Good Son had its world premiere at the Bakehouse Theatre in April 2015. Presented by The Other Ones, it was directed by Corey McMahon, and featured Eugenia Fragos, Renato Musolino, Adriana Bonaccurso, and Demitrios Sirilas.

The Gods of Strangers, set in Port Pirie, is based on the oral histories of Greek, Cypriot and Italian people who migrated to regional South Australia after World War II. It was staged by the State Theatre Company South Australia in 2018, playing at the Dunstan Playhouse in Adelaide as well as in Port Pirie. It was also filmed by local production company KOJO and intended to be shown by Country Arts SA in regional cinemas in 2020, but it was later shown online owing to the COVID-19 pandemic in South Australia.

Carapetis' rewritten version of Antigone, described as a response to the original written by Sophocles, portrays a feminist theme. The play consists of a series of monologues and vignettes, which together rail against the silencing and devaluing of women in society. The play was produced by the State Theatre Company of South Australia, directed by Anthony Nicola, at the Odeon Theatre in Norwood in June 2022.

=== Film and TV ===
In 2007, a script written by Carapetis was selected out of 1,700 submissions as an episode of the 25x5min series Marx and Venus on the SBS.

Carapetis wrote and directed the short film Blame the Rabbit, which was shown at the 2023 Adelaide Film Festival. Based on the Greek myth of the Gorgon and described as a cautionary tale, it is intended as "the first of a trilogy based on a Greek myth or tragedy that looks at the objectification of women". Blame the Rabbit recently won the Grand Jury Prize at the South Australian Screen Awards in 2024.

In 2025, Carapetis appeared in the third season of Channel 7 drama RFDS. On 20 November 2025, Carapetis was named in the cast for ABC series Treasure & Dirt.

== Current occupation ==
As of January 2024, Carapetis is working as a story consultant at producer Lisa Scott's film production company Highview Productions, based at the South Australian Film Corporation. She has been commissioned to write a major work for STCSA's 2024 season.

Carapetis recently won SA Life Magazine's South Australian Artist of the Year for 2024.

== Personal life ==
Carapetis loves dogs and as of 2022 has a labradoodle. She loves reading, knitting, music (especially Kate Bush), and cooking Greek food for her friends.

== Filmography ==
=== Films ===
Year	Title	Role	Notes
2017	Bad Blood	Rose	
2012	Dead Europe	Sophie	
2012	The Pyjama Monologues	Helen	
2011	Burning Man	Jane	
2009	Offside	Isabella	
2008	Dusk		
2005	Look Both Ways	Maria	
2004	Frames	Eva	

=== Television ===
Year	Title	Role	Notes	Ref
2026	Treasure & Dirt	Billie	TV series	
2025	RFDS	Anna Galanis	TV series: 7 episodes	
2025	Ten Pound Poms	Sophia	TV series: 1 episode	
2022	Irreverent	Bishop Kylie Crabbe	TV series: 3 episodes	
2022	Upright	Nina	TV series: 2 episodes	
2022	Beep & Mort	Various	TV series	
2022	The Tourist	Pam Renton	TV seriesL 1 episode	
2021	Aftertaste	Vassiliki	TV series: 1 episode	
2019	The Hunting	Amanda	TV series: 4 episodes	
2010	Wicked Love: The Maria Korp Story	Detective Shameem	TV movie	
2000-09	All Saints	Patrice / Patti	TV series 2 episodes	
2004	Blue Heelers	Cath Matarazzo	1 episode	
2003	Snobs	Vet	1 episode	
2003	Marking Time	Gemma	TV series	
2001	Water Rats	June Sutcliffe	1 episode	
1998-99	Heartbreak High	Jackie Kassis	24 episodes	
1998	Murder Call	Despina Stasinopoulos	1 episode	
1998	Children's Hospital	Liz	1 episode	
1997	Spellbinder: Land of the Dragon Lord	Assistant	2 episodes	

== Stage ==
Carapetis has written plays in conjunction with the State Theatre Co in South Australia.

Year	Title	Role	Notes	Ref
2024	Sista Girl	Co Playwright	Perth	
2022	Antigone	Playwright	State Theatre Co	
2018	The Gods of Strangers	Playwright	State Theatre Co	
