= Tanja Liedtke =

Australian dancer

Tanja Michaela Karin Liedtke (6 October 1977 – 17 August 2007) was a German-born professional choreographer and dancer. She was most noted as a dancer, choreographer and director of contemporary dance in Australia and Europe.

== Early life and education ==
Tanja Michaela Karin Liedtke was born on 6 October 1977 in Stuttgart, West Germany. As a young child, she moved with her family to Madrid, Spain, where she began to study ballet. Her family then settled in London, England, where she won a place to study at the Elmhurst School for Dance.

After deciding to pursue a career in contemporary dance, she continued her studies at the Rambert School in London, graduating in 1995.

== Career ==
Liedtke was granted Australian citizenship in 1996, keeping the dual German and Australian citizenship, and began her professional career with Australian Dance Theatre, working with the company until 2003. During this time, she toured with the company internationally, most notably around Australia, Asia, United Kingdom and North America. After ADT, she returned to England, where she joined the London-based DV8 Physical Theatre, under the direction of choreographer Lloyd Newson. During 2001 to 2007 Liedtke started to choreograph her own work. In 2007, Liedtke was appointed artistic director of the Sydney Dance Company, succeeding the founder Graeme Murphy. However, she did not have the opportunity to take the position, as she was killed in a road accident in Sydney before she was due to start.

== Legacy ==
The Tanja Liedtke Foundation was established in May 2008 in honour of her work. The foundation's purpose is to support the enrichment and advancement of contemporary dance theatre, and the development of Australian/European artistic connections.

The Tanja Liedtke Foundation is registered in Stuttgart, Germany, as Tanja Liedtke Stiftung, with tax-privileged purposes in accordance with German Law.

The film Life in Movement directed by Bryan Mason and Sophie Hyde from Adelaide film company Closer Productions about her was named best work at the 2011 Ruby Awards for the arts. It also won the 2011 Foxtel Australian Documentary Prize and won AACTA nominations for direction and for best feature documentary.

In 2023, Australian Dance Theatre (ADT) in Adelaide partnered with the Tanja Liedtke Foundation to offer four Tanja Liedtke Studio creative residencies at the Odeon Theatre, Norwood, the home of ADT. Those winning the residences would receive a stipend of A$2,500, along with free studio space for two weeks.

== Awards ==
- 1999 - Dance Australia Critics Choice Award for Most Promising Choreography
- 2000 - Dance Australia Critics Choice Award for Most Promising Choreography
- 2006 - Australian Dance Award for Outstanding Achievement in Choreography for her production of Twelfth Floor
- 2008 - Helpmann Award for Best Choreography in a Dance or Physical Theatre Work for her choreography of "Construct" (posthumous)
- 2009 - Australian Dance Award for Outstanding Achievement in Choreography for her choreography of Construct (posthumous)
- 2009 - Australian Dance Award for Outstanding Achievement in Independent Dance for her choreography of Construct (posthumous)

== See also ==
- The Cost of Living (2004 film)
