= Birdeater =

- Film poster
- Directed by: Jack Clark; Jim Weir
- Written by: Jack Clark; Jim Weir
- Produced by: Ulysses Oliver (Breathless Films); Stephanie Troost
- Starring: Mackenzie Fearnley; Shabana Azeez; Ben Hunter
- Cinematography: Roger Stonehouse
- Edited by: Ben Anderson
- Music by: Andreas Dominguez
- Distributed by: Umbrella Entertainment
- Release dates: 11 June 2023 (Sydney Film Festival); 18 July 2024 (Australia)
- Running time: 113 minutes
- Country: Australia

Birdeater is a 2023 Australian psychological thriller film written and directed by Jack Clark and Jim Weir in their directorial debut.

== Synopsis ==
A group of privileged young men gather for Louie's bachelor party in a rural location one night. Louie has invited his fiancée, Irene, and one of his friends, Charlie, invites his fiancée Grace, to make Irene feel more comfortable. As time goes on, it becomes apparent that there are serious flaws in Louie's relationship with Irene.

== Cast ==
- Mackenzie Fearnley as Louie
- Shabana Azeez as Irene
- Ben Hunter as Dylan
- Jack Bannister as Charlie
- Clementine Anderson as Grace
- Alfie Gledhill as Murph
- Harley Wilson as Sam
- Caroline McQuade as Lady Lazurus

== Production ==
Writer-directors Weir and Clark met while both studying at the Australian Film, Television and Radio School in Sydney. It took them around 18 months to get the film into production owing to lack of funding, which in the end came from around eight parties who each put in A$10,000.

The film is set in a rural location in New South Wales, and was filmed in the bush around the village of St Albans in Hawkesbury. Filming began in a valley called Forgotten Valley in 2021, but the set was washed out by flooding and after four weeks they had run out of money after shooting only half of the film. Six months later a new investor came on board and they finished shooting in two weeks.

Fledging Sydney production company Breathless Films, run by co-founders Ulysses Oliver and Ben Ferris, helped with the development and produced the film.

== Release ==
Birdeater had its world premiere at the Sydney Film Festival in June 2023, and was also screened at the 2023 Melbourne and Brisbane International Film Festivals. It screened at SXSW in Austin, Texas, in 2024.

The film opened in Australian cinemas on 18 July 2024.

== Reception ==
Birdeater received mixed reviews. Many reviewers likened it to the 1971 classic Australian horror film Wake in Fright, with both films featuring urban professionals in rural locations, and both looking at the effects of toxic masculinity, although through very different characters and reflecting their respective contemporary cultures.

The film holds a 74% approval rating on review aggregator Rotten Tomatoes, based on 43 reviews with an average grade of 6.3/10.

Peter Gray of The AU Review gave the film five out of five stars, writing "Visceral and feral, Birdeater blends its topical commentary on separation anxiety and fragile masculinity with an almost hallucinatory mentality. Its intrusive editing and claustrophobic camera shots further highlight Weir and Clark's stronghold on genre execution, resulting in a truly horrific vision that revels in its uncompromising temperament". Grace Roodenrys, writing in the Sydney Arts Guide, called it "A brilliant new Australian film", giving it five out of five stars. X-Press Magazine gave the film 9 out of 10 stars, praising the acting, direction, pacing, and editing.

FilmInk valued the film as worth A$15.00 (out of a maximum of A$20.00), writing "it's not breaking any new ground, but it's suspenseful, effectively disturbing and for the most part, very well acted".

Ari Mattes wrote in The Conversation: "Birdeater is brilliantly shot and edited, the sound design and music are exemplary... and the acting is absolutely first-rate", and thinks it worth seeing, but that the second half did not live up to the promise of the first. Luke Buckmaster gave it two stars out of five, and wrote in The Guardian "Shabana Azeez and Mackenzie Fearnley are good as the husband and wife to be but this horror film feels indecisive and stretches too long".

== Awards and nominations ==
- Audience award, 2023 Sydney Film Festival
