= Sophie Hyde =

Australian film producer, writer and director

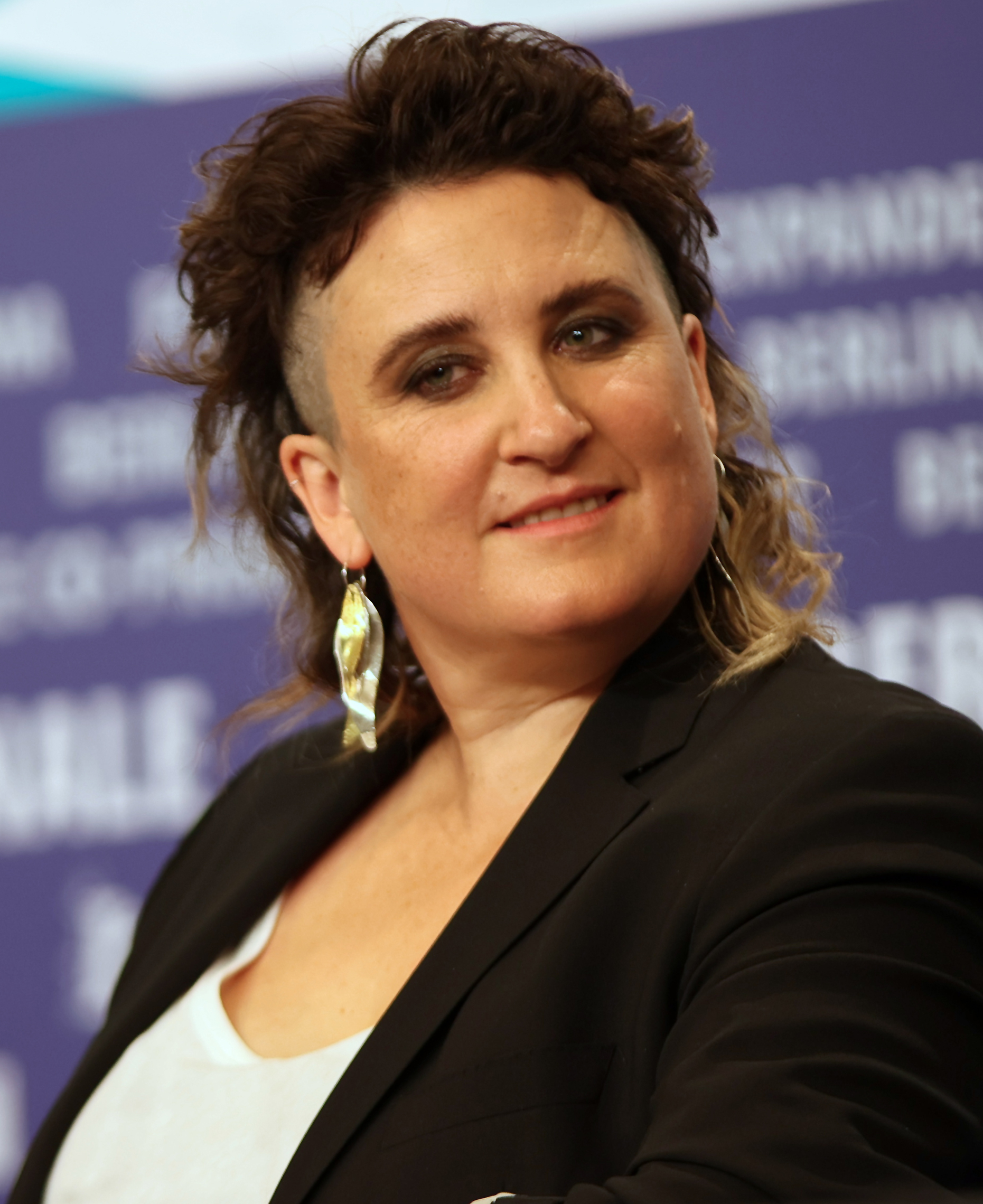
- Hyde at the 2022 Berlin International Film Festival
- Born: 1977 (age 48–49)
- Education: Flinders University; La Trobe University
- Occupations: Film director; writer; film producer
- Notable work: 52 Tuesdays; Animals; Good Luck to You, Leo Grande; Jimpa
- Partner: Bryan Mason
- Children: Aud Mason-Hyde
- Website: closerproductions.com.au

Sophie Hyde (born 1977) is an Australian film director, writer, and producer based in Adelaide, South Australia. She is co-founder of Closer Productions and known for her award-winning debut fiction film, 52 Tuesdays (2013), as well as the comedy drama Animals (2019); the sex comedy drama Good Luck to You, Leo Grande (2022), starring Emma Thompson; and her semi-autobiographical film Jimpa, starring Olivia Colman and John Lithgow, which premiered at the 2025 Sundance Film Festival. She has also made several documentaries, including Life in Movement (2011), a documentary about dancer and choreographer Tanja Liedtke, and television series, such as The Hunting (2019).

== Early life and education ==
Sophie Hyde was born in Adelaide in 1977, the daughter of Patricia and Jim Hyde.

As a teenager, she learnt acting skills at the Unley Youth Theatre (later Urban Myth), where she met some of her future colleagues. She later studied film theatre at Flinders University in Adelaide and followed up at La Trobe University in Melbourne, graduating with a Bachelor of Arts in 1998.

== Work ==
=== 2000s ===
In 2005, Hyde returned to Adelaide with funding to make a film about women's toilets. Later that year, she reconnected with a college acquaintance, editor and cinematographer Bryan Mason. They began a personal and professional relationship, forming a film company, Closer Productions.

=== 2010s ===
Hyde and Mason started making videos for nightclubs and dance shows, then moved to documentary films. After becoming friends with choreographer and dancer Tanja Liedtke, they started making a documentary about her. After the dancer's untimely death in a traffic accident in Sydney in 2007, they completed the film and named it Life in Movement, which was named best work at the 2011 Ruby Awards for the arts, won the 2011 Foxtel Australian Documentary Prize and won AACTA nominations for direction and for best feature documentary.

Hyde completed her first feature film as director, co-writer and co-producer, 52 Tuesdays, filmed in Adelaide in 2013, then spent a year promoting it. This film earned many accolades, including World Cinema Dramatic Directing Award for Hyde at Sundance in 2014 and a Crystal Bear at the Berlin International Film Festival.

Hyde's next project was a six-part TV series called Fucking Adelaide (aka F*!#ing Adelaide), commissioned by the Australian Broadcasting Corporation and Screen Australia, aired on national TV from 15 July 2018 and ABC iview after debuting at the Adelaide Film Festival in 2017. A dark comedy about "home, family, identity and the 'small town-ness' of Adelaide", each episode was a part of a story told from a different character’s perspective, including a character played by Hyde's child Audrey and also starring Tilda Cobham-Hervey, Brendan Maclean and Kate Box as three siblings who respond to their mother's (played by Pamela Rabe) request to return to the family home in Adelaide. Hyde has said that "It’s about the beautiful side of family, but also the negative side of being around people who feel like they know you, but perhaps don't allow you to change."; also that it reflects her love of Adelaide, which is greater once one has been away. The title started out as a joke, reflecting how Hyde felt about returning to Adelaide after being away — "both comforting and claustrophobic". Co-written by Matthew Cormack and Matt Vesely and produced by Rebecca Summerton, it was in competition at the Series Mania International Festival in France in 2018, and screened in Berlin.

In 2018 Hyde made Animals, based on the novel of the same name by Emma Jane Unsworth, in Dublin. This was her first feature film shot abroad, and was screened in the Premieres category at the 2019 Sundance Film Festival and as an Adelaide Film Festival "pop-up" event in April 2019. It was an Irish-Australian co-production and although not initiated by Hyde, it was a Closer Productions film.

In January 2019 it was announced that a drama mini-series called The Hunting would be screened later in the year on SBS TV, produced and directed by Hyde and starring Richard Roxburgh, Asher Keddie, Pamela Rabe, Sam Reid, Jessica De Gouw, Elena Carapetis and Sachin Joab.

In My Blood It Runs (2019), directed by Gayby Baby director Maya Newell, produced by Hyde, Rachel Nanninaaq Edwardson, Larissa Behrendt and Newell and made in collaboration with Arrernte and Garrwa people in the Northern Territory, had its world premiere at the Hot Docs Canadian International Documentary Festival in Toronto in April/May 2019.

=== 2020s ===
Starting to work as an international freelance director, in 2021 Hyde directed the comedy film, starring Emma Thompson, called Good Luck to You, Leo Grande. Written by Katy Brand, the film was made by Genesius Pictures in the UK. This was her first film in a long time as an independent director, without Closer Productions and without acting as producer as well. It premiered at the 2022 Sundance Film Festival (an online rather than in-person event because of the COVID-19 pandemic in the United States) on 23 January 2022. It was released on Hulu in the US on 17 June 2022, in UK cinemas on the same date, and in Australian cinemas from 18 August 2022.

In May 2024 it was announced that Olivia Colman would be starring alongside John Lithgow in Hyde's new film Jimpa, "an inter-generational queer family drama". The film also stars Hyde's child Aud Mason-Hyde, Daniel Henshall, Kate Box, and Tilda Cobham-Hervey. It had its world premiere at the Sundance Film Festival on 23 January 2025, and has its Australian premiere as the opening gala film at the Adelaide Film Festival on 15 October 2025. The film is partly based on Hyde's life, with Colman's role as Hannah playing a fictionalised version of Hyde. The family and the actors talked about the making of the film in an episode of the documentary series Australian Story on ABC Television on 16 February 2026, shortly before its release in Australian cinemas.

In October 2022 it was reported that Hyde was slated to direct upcoming biopic An Ideal Wife, centring on the sexual awakening experienced by poet-author Constance Lloyd when she found out her husband Oscar Wilde was homosexual.

== Closer Productions ==
Hyde is co-founder, along with Mason, of the film production company Closer Productions, which is based in the Adelaide suburb of Glenside. Other members of the Closer team are Mason (editor, DOP, producer, director); Matthew Bate (writer, director); Rebecca Summerton (producer); Matthew Cormack (writer, sales/delivery); Raynor Pettge (visual effects, editor); and Matt Vesely (development manager, writer, director).

== Recognition and awards ==
A 2024 homage to her work as a filmmaker published in FilmInk's Unsung Auteurs series noted her "strong visual sense and taste for the daring and unusual", but said that her "sensitivity towards actors... really gives Sophie Hyde her directorial power", and that she is "nothing short of a national treasure".

Awards include:

- Numerous nominations and awards for 52 Tuesdays
- 2009: Melbourne International Film Festival — Best Experimental Short Film — Winner (with Kat Worth) — Necessary Games
- 2012: AACTA Awards — Best Feature Length Documentary — Nominee (shared with Bryan Mason) — Life in Movement (2011)
- 2012: AACTA Awards — Best Feature Length Documentary — Nominee (shared with Matthew Bate) — Shut Up Little Man! An Audio Misadventure (2011)
- 2012: AACTA Awards — Best Direction in a Documentary — Nominee (shared with Bryan Mason) — Life in Movement (2011)
- 2018: Screen Producers Australia (SPA) Awards - Online Series Production of the Year – Winner (Closer Productions) – Fucking Adelaide (2017)

== Personal life ==
Hyde's husband and professional partner is Bryan Mason, and they have a child, Aud Mason-Hyde.

Mason-Hyde is non-binary, and gave a TEDx talk on the subject in Adelaide Town Hall to around 1000 people when they were 12. They also appeared on ABC Television's Four Corners when they were 14. Growing up around films, they performed in many school musicals, as well as some of Hyde's films and TV series. Mason-Hyde co-founded an arts organisation led by trans people called Transmedium with friend and filmmaker Claud Bailey, and as of February 2026 produces a regular zine for trans youth.

On 16 February 2026, the family, including Sophie's elder sister Alice, were featured in Australian Story on ABC Television, talking about their lives and, along with lead actors Olivia Colman and John Lithgow, about the making of Jimpa, a very personal film based on their own lives.

== Partial filmography ==
=== As director ===
- Ok, Let's Talk About Me (2005) - short documentary. Producer, director.
- The Road to Wallaroo (2006) - short documentary biography. Producer, director.
- My Last Ten Hours with you (2007) - short drama/ romance LGBT-themed film, included in the Boys on Film DVD series (6: Pacific Rim). Director.
- Necessary Games (2009) - short drama/fantasy. Producer, co-director (with Kat Worth).
- Elephantiasis (2010) - short film. Producer, director. Winner, Best Director, World of Women Film Festival.
- Life in Movement (2011) - documentary about dancer and choreographer Tanja Liedtke. Producer/director/writer.
- 52 Tuesdays (2014) - drama. Producer, director, co-writer with Matthew Cormack.
- Animals (2019) - comedy/drama. Producer/director.
- Good Luck to You, Leo Grande (2022)
- Jimpa (2025)
- An Ideal Wife (TBA)

=== As producer ===
- Shut Up Little Man! An Audio Misadventure (2011) - documentary/comedy/drama (written and directed by Matthew Bate). Producer.
- Sam Klemke's Time Machine (2015) - feature length documentary (written and directed by Matthew Bate). Producer.
- My Best Friend is Stuck on the Ceiling (2015) - short comic film (written and directed by Matt Vesely). Co-producer.
- In My Blood It Runs (formerly Kids) (2019) - documentary (directed by Maya Newell and others). Producer.

=== Television ===
- Fucking Adelaide (2017) - TV comedy drama mini-series (6 short episodes) for ABC TV. Producer/director. AKA F*!#ing Adelaide and F**king Adelaide.
- The Hunting (2019) - four-part drama miniseries screening on SBS in August 2019. Producer/director.

=== Video ===
- Beyond Beliefs: Muslims & Non-Muslims in Australia (2007) - documentary. Producer, writer.

=== Others ===
- Wastelander Panda (2012), a three-part webseries (executive producer); prologue for a television series

== See also ==
- List of female film and television directors
- List of LGBT-related films directed by women
