= The Airport Chaplain =

Australian television drama series

- Genre: Drama
- Created by: Elise McCredie; Jude Troy
- Starring: Hugo Weaving; Shabana Azeez; Claudia Karvan; Thomas Weatherall; Errol Shand
- Country of origin: Australia
- Original language: English

Production
- Executive producers: Jude Troy; Elise McCreadie; Richard Finlayson; Nakul Legha
- Producer: Jude Troy
- Cinematography: Alex Cardy; Sky Davies
- Production company: Wooden Horse

Original release
- Network: SBS
- Release: 26 August 2026 – present

The Airport Chaplain is a 2026 Australian television drama series for SBS Television. Created by Elise McCredie and Jude Troy, the series focuses on Tobias Wallace, the airport "fixer", who thinks the airport cannot run without him, played by Hugo Weaving. Also starring are Shabana Azeez, Claudia Karvan, Thomas Weatherall, and Arka Das. The eight-part series aired from 26 August on SBS Television and SBS on Demand in Australia, and on Netflix in all regions outside Australia on the same day.

== Plot ==
Tobias Wallace, the airport fixer, has an unusual but effective approach to dealing with the daily crises unfolding in the terminal. However, his new boss, Mira, calls him a liability. A power clash sees an effect that ripples through the airport and its staff.

== Cast ==
- Hugo Weaving as Tobias Wallace
- Shabana Azeez as Mira Ansari-Cole
- Claudia Karvan as Cath Barnes
- Thomas Weatherall as Johnny Flick
- Arka Das as Sami Rahman
- Erroll Shand as Lex Pascoe
- Claude Jabbour as Anthony Cole
- Kavitha Anandasivam as Asha Chawla

== Episodes ==
No.	Title	Directed by	Written by	Original release date (Note: All episodes became available on 26 August 2026 on SBS on Demand)	Viewers (millions)
1	"God Complex"	Bonnie Moir	Elise McCredie	26 August 2026	0.239
2	"Declaration"	Bonnie Moir	Sarah Bassiuoni & Elise McCredie	26 August 2026	0.239
3	"Excess Baggage"	Bonnie Moir	Elise McCredie	2 September 2026	TBD
4	"Forever My Friend"	Bonnie Moir	Mithila Gupta	2 September 2026	TBD
5	"Upstairs Downstairs"	Tig Terera	Sarah Bassiuoni	9 September 2026	TBD
6	"Life is War"	Tig Terera	Elise McCredie & Vidya Rajan	9 September 2026	TBD
7	"Running"	Tig Terera	Elise McCredie	16 September 2026	TBD
8	"Prepare for Landing"	Tig Terera	Vidya Rajan	16 September 2026	TBD

== Production ==
On 4 September 2025, SBS announced that the series had entered pre-production. Then titled The Chaplain and It, the series was based on a real-life encounter from series creators Elise McCredie and Jude Troy. It was filmed in Melbourne.

On 2 February 2026, SBS announced the series had gone into production in and around Melbourne using purpose-built sets, securing funding from Screen Australia and VicScreen, creating over 150 local jobs for cast and crew. On the same date, the cast for the series was announced.

The Airport Chaplain was co-created and executive produced by Elise McCredie and Jude Troy for Wooden Horse Production. It was written by McCredie, Sarah Bassiuoni, Mithila Gupta, and Vidya Rajan, and directed by Bonnie Moir and Tig Terera. Terera, who was born in Zimbabwe and is based in Melbourne, previously created the 2024 SBS drama miniseries Swift Street. Bonnie Moir directed season 2 of Love Me and the 2024 television series Exposure.

Cinematography was by Alex Cardy and Sky Davies.

== Release ==
The world premiere of the series took place at the Melbourne International Film Festival, where three episodes were screened on 15 August 2026, with Bonnie Moir, Jude Troy, Elise McCredie, Hugo Weaving, Claudia Karvan, and Thomas Weatherall in attendance.

The eight-part series of half-hour episodes was released on SBS Television and SBS on Demand on 26 August 2026. It is also going to stream on Netflix in all regions outside Australia on the same day, reaching over 190 countries and regions, making it the first SBS Original drama to launch simultaneously on Netflix outside Australia.

== Reception ==
Based on the first four episodes, Craig Mathieson of The Sydney Morning Herald gave the series 4 out of 5 stars, as did Luke Buckmaster of The Guardian. Buckmaster praises the performances, in particular Weaving, and describes the series as "thoroughly bingeable". Stephen A. Russell of ScreenHub Australia gave the series 4 out of 5 stars, based on the first three episodes. He praises the performances of many of the actors, as well as the cinematography, and notes that "the fractious relationship between Tobias and Mira, with Azeez a grand sparring partner and the kinks in their working relationship, [make] for great TV".

RMIT University digital communication lecturer Alexa Scarlata called the series "perfection", "a triumph for local television, and also on a global scale as the public broadcaster's global Netflix debut". She writes in The Conversation that it "effectively and engagingly uses the cultural melting pot of the airport setting to fulfil the broadcaster's multicultural remit".

David Knox of TV Tonight called the show "a welcome addition to the drama pantheon", praises the sets, and writes "Hugo Weaving brings gravitas, tenderness and humour to the chaos of an airport".
