= Jonathan Brough =

New Zealand/Australian film & TV director

Jonathan Brough is a New Zealand-born film director based in Australia. He is best known for the comedy TV series Rosehaven, Aftertaste and The Family Law.

== Early life and education ==
Brough grew up in Hāwera, New Zealand, the son of John Brough, a theatre and television actor.

== Career ==
Brough's graduation project was The Model, a short film (11 minutes) based on a short story by Bernard Malamud, inspired by the work of painter Edward Hopper, and starring Brough's father and Susannah Devereux (later a horror actress in the US). The film was an official selection in the 1994 Cannes Film Festival for a special one-off programme of short films, and was screened at the Silver Images Film Festival in Chicago, U.S. The film was later included in a video anthology called Dark Stories 2: Tales from Beneath (2002).

In following years he directed two short films, The Conversation (1995) and Permanent Wave (1996).

In 2004 he directed four episodes of the television drama series The Insider's Guide to Happiness, and was responsible for directing several documentaries about the making of the film Whale Rider, for the DVD extras, and a separate release, Riding the Wave: The Whale Rider Story.

Also in 2004 he made No Ordinary Sun, a short sci fi film set in Antarctica, which he described as "the closest yet as a statement of what I want to achieve as a filmmaker". It screened at the Edinburgh and Slamdance Film Festivals.

Brough co-created the mockumentary series The Pretender in 2005, and directed six episodes in all, including the opening episodes of both seasons.

He directed many episodes of the American TV series of Power Rangers 2006 to 2007 and from 2008 to 2015.

In 2008 he travelled to Russia make a film about a New Zealand charity worker, entitled Russia's Forgotten Children.

For a couple of years from 2011 he worked in both Australia, where he directed two episodes of the supernatural comedy-drama Spirited, and New Zealand, where he directed another short film, Snowmen (2014), which screened at the interfilm Berlin in 2015, as well as episodes the comedy series Coverband.

Brough directed the comedy series It's a Date which went to air for two seasons in 2013 and 2014, and several episodes of The Time of Our Lives over the same period. He started being nominated for and winning awards with his work in Australian comedy, including Sammy J & Randy in Ricketts Lane (2015).

His work on the popular comedy series Rosehaven and The Family Law was acclaimed, with the former winning many accolades.

Brough directed the Fox Showcase/Sky Atlantic drama series The End (2020) tackled the subject of euthanasia.

He directed the first season of the Australian TV series Aftertaste in 2021.

== Awards ==
- 2005: Nomination, New Zealand Screen Awards, for No Ordinary Sun
- 2005: Winner, inaugural Friends of the Civic Award for Best NZ Short at the Auckland Film Festival, for No Ordinary Sun
- 2016: Winner, ADG Award for Best Direction in a TV Comedy (Australian Directors Guild), for episode 1 of Sammy J & Randy in Ricketts Lane
- 2017: Nomination, ADG Award for Best Direction in a TV Comedy, for Rosehaven
- 2017: Nomination, ADG Award for Best Direction in a TV Comedy, for The Family Law
- 2021: Nomination, AACTA Award for Best Miniseries or Telefeature
