= Jean Janssens =

Jean Janssens may refer to:

- Jean Janssens (footballer) (born 1944), Belgian football player
- Jean-Baptiste Janssens (1889–1964), Belgian Jesuit priest
