= Qingdao TV Tower =

Television tower in Qingdao, China

Coordinates: 36°04′07.81″N 120°21′01.87″E

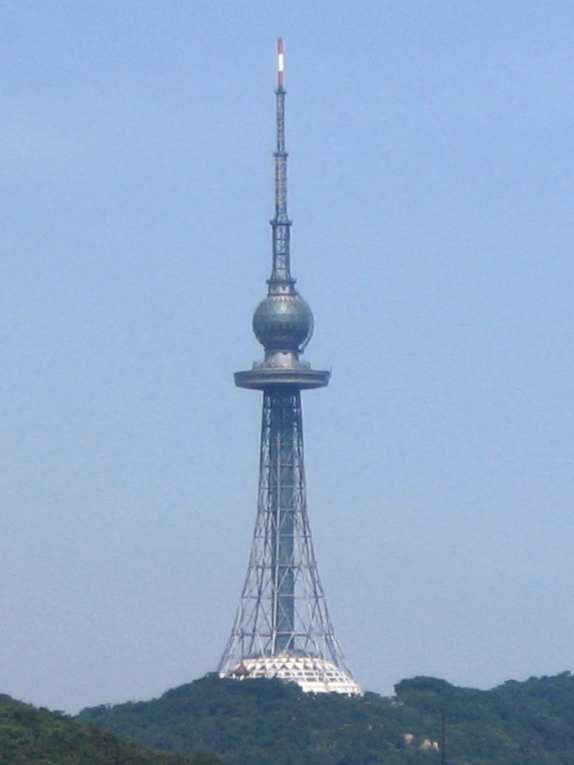
Qingdao TV tower

Qingdao TV Tower is 232 metres (761 ft) tall lattice television tower with an observation deck situated on the top of 116 metres high Taiping Hill in Julin Hill Park in Qingdao, China. It is the tallest attraction in the city.

Construction on the Qingdao TV Tower began in 1993 and was completed in 1996. Architect Renle Ma is known for other tower structures such as the Zhongyuan Tower and the Henan Tower (FU Tower). The steel tower weighs 2000 tons and is home to 11 broadcasting facilities.

The tower has a restaurant in a ball-shaped cabinet 130 metres above the ground; under this ball, there is a cylindric cabinet containing a 230 square metres sightseeing platform. In the basement of the tower, there is an Olympic museum, as the 2008 Summer Olympics sailing events took place at Qingdao.

== See also ==
- List of towers
