= Rebecca Summerton =

Australian film producer

- Education: Flinders University (BA)
- Occupation: Film producer
- Years active: 2006–present
- Known for: The Hunting; Aftertaste; Animals

Rebecca "Bec" Summerton is an Australian film producer who does most of her work with Closer Productions in Adelaide, South Australia. Working in film and television across many genres, she is known for producing 52 Tuesdays, The Hunting, Aftertaste, and Animals.

== Early life and education ==
Rebecca Summerton did a Bachelor of Arts at Flinders University in Adelaide.

== Career ==
In 2006 Summerton produced the short film My Last Ten Hours With You, directed by Sophie Hyde, which was screened at the Melbourne International Film Festival in 2007. The film won several awards including at the SA Short Screen Awards (part of the Adelaide Film Festival) including Best Film, Best Direction, Best Drama, and Emerging Producer. It won Best Film at the Mardi Gras My Queer Career Film Festival and the Audience Award at Melbourne Queer Film Festival, and was selected for competition at Uppsala Film Festival in Sweden and St Kilda Film Festival in Melbourne.

She worked at the South Australian Film Corporation in the 2000s, where she was key in the establishment of the FilmLab initiative in 2008, to encourage emerging filmmakers to create their first feature films on a low budget. In 2007-8 she was a part-time project officer at SAFC.

After joining Closer Productions in 2011, she produced the feature documentary Sam Klemke's Time Machine, which premiered at the Sundance Film Festival in 2015 and was also screened at the Rotterdam International Film Festival. In the same year she produced director Sophie Hyde's award-winning debut feature 52 Tuesdays.

Summerton has produced many documentaries, including the Dendy Award-winning short film I Want to Dance Better at Parties in 2014. For television, she produced the three-part documentary series about art, Hannah Gadsby's Oz, and the six-part comedy drama Fucking Adelaide in 2018.

Summerton produced the SBS Television drama mini-series The Hunting (2019) and the feature film Animals, released in 2021. The Hunting attracted the highest number of viewers ever for a drama series on SBS.

In 2020-2022 Summerton co-produced (with Erik Thomson and Matthew Bate) two series of the comedy-drama Aftertaste for ABC Television.

In September 2021, Summerton, along with Closer colleague Sophie Hyde, were announced as recipients of the Global Producers Exchange, a joint initiative by Screen Australia and Australians in Film which connects Australian producers with Hollywood decision-makers and creatives.

In November 2022 it was announced that Summerton and filmmaker Lisa Scott of Highview Productions(with whom she had previously collaborated on The Hunting in 2019) had bought the rights to adapt Pip Williams' bestseller The Dictionary of Lost Words into a television series. Scott and Summerton will develop and adapt the book for television.

She acted as executive producer for the documentary film The Defenders, made by Matthew Bate and released on Amazon Prime Video in 2023. The film told the story of the fight to save Bahraini refugee footballer Hakeem al-Araibi from imprisonment, after he was arrested in Thailand on orders from Bahrain.

Summerton will co-produce the upcoming feature film Luna with Richard Harris, written by Mark Rogers, and directed and co-written by Aaron Lucas.

== Other activities ==
Summerton was appointed to the board of the South Australian Film Corporation in December 2019, completing her term in December 2022.

In December 2022, she was appointed to an interim board of Mercury CX, headed by producers Kirsty Stark and Peter Hanlon, appointed to keep the Mercury Cinema afloat. As of August 2024 the board is still in existence.

She was on the jury of the 2020 Adelaide Film Festival.

Summerton has also been a member of the external advisory panel to the Assemblage Centre for Creative Arts at Flinders University, headed by Garry Stewart, along with Greg Mackie, Wesley Enoch, Jo Dyer, and others.

Summerton is also a co-owner of Closer Productions.

== Awards ==
Summerton's work as a producer has received recognition, including the following nominations and wins:

- 2014: Winner, Dendy Award, for I Want to Dance Better at Parties
- 2014: Nominated, Asia Pacific Screen Award for Best Youth Feature Film, for 52 Tuesdays
- 2019: Nominated, AACTA Award for Best Telefeature or Mini Series at the 9th AACTA Awards, for The Hunting
- 2021: Nominated, AACTA Award for Best Television Comedy Series at the 11th AACTA Awards, for Aftertaste
