= A Sunburnt Christmas =

Australian Christmas film

- Directed by: Christiaan Van Vuuren
- Screenplay by: Elliot Vella; Gretel Vella; Timothy Walker
- Produced by: Lisa Scott
- Starring: Daniel Henshall; Sullivan Stapleton; Tatiana Goode
- Cinematography: Dylan River
- Edited by: Denise Haratzis
- Music by: Amanda Brown; Damien Lane
- Production companies: Every Cloud Productions; Highview Productions
- Distributed by: Stan
- Release date: 11 December 2020
- Country: Australia
- Language: English

A Sunburnt Christmas is a 2020 Australian Christmas film, made as a Stan original. Directed by Christiaan Van Vuuren on his feature-length debut, from a script by Elliot Vella, Gretel Vella, and Timothy Walker, the film stars Daniel Henshall, Sullivan Stapleton, and Tatiana Goode.

== Synopsis ==
A struggling Australian outback farm gets gatecrashed by an on-the-run criminal Daryl, dressed as Santa Claus. On the run from a mobster, and mistaken for the real Santa by the youngest child of the single parent family, Daisy, her wily teenage sister Hazel sees Daryl as an opportunity to get her family back on track.

== Cast ==
- Daniel Henshall as Daryl Dunn
- Sullivan Stapleton as Dingo
- Tatiana Goode as Hazel
- Ling Cooper Tang as Fiona Raley
- Lena Nankivell as Daisy
- Matt Vesely as Clyde Dandy
- Eadan McGuiness as Tom
- Alirio Zavarce
- Ewine McMorrine

== Production ==
The film is produced by Every Cloud Productions and Highview Productions. Lisa Scott of Highview Productions is producer, with executive producers Fiona Eagger and Deb Cox for Every Cloud, and Mike Jones co-producing. Financing also came from Screen Australia, in association with Stan, with finance also from the South Australian Film Corporation.

Filming took place in Adelaide and Callington, South Australia, in 2020. For Van Vuuren the film was his feature-length directorial debut. It was completed in under 20 weeks from start to finish during strict COVID-19 pandemic protocols, with principal photography cut from four weeks to three weeks as a result. The idea was pitched in May 2020 and by August pre-production had started with Van Vuuren and writers Elliott and Gretel Vella and Timothy Walker working quickly to allow a September shoot before editing and post-production could be completed in October and November before a Christmas release.

== Release ==
A Sunburnt Christmas was available to stream in Australia on Stan from Friday, 11 December 2020.

== Reception ==
Luke Buckmaster in The Guardian described it as a "wacky and sweet" film that "builds from the outset a jive and momentum, setting a tone and visual flavour that reflects the playfulness of the script". Praise came for the cinematography of Dylan River, who "shoots with a rich but playful look", and the camera work of director Van Vuuren, who "brings the camera in on the joke. It doesn’t just capture the mise-en-scène; it explores the space for comedic potential".

Writing in The Curb, Andrew F. Pierce described the film thus: "A Sunburnt Christmas instantly becomes an Aussie Christmas classic, sure to find itself on high rotation each festive season", due to how Van Vuuren navigates the comedy and heart perfectly, balancing a tightrope of tones", and "absolutely stellar, tight script".

The Sydney Morning Herald cautions that it is a little too dark and violent to become "a fair dinkum family Christmas classic", but that it has "a heart the size of the Outback" and is "loads of fun, and brim-full of charm − thanks in large part to a delightful dirtbag-Santa performance from Daniel Henshall".
