= The Hunting =

Australian drama series

- Genre: Drama
- Created by: Sophie Hyde; Matthew Cormack
- Written by: Matthew Cormack; Niki Aken
- Directed by: Ana Kokkinos; Sophie Hyde
- Starring: Asher Keddie; Richard Roxburgh; Sam Reid; Jessica De Gouw
- Theme music composer: Benjamin Speed
- Composer: Benjamin Speed
- Country of origin: Australia
- No. of episodes: 4

Production
- Executive producer: Sue Masters (SBS)
- Producers: Rebecca Summerton; Sophie Hyde; Lisa Scott
- Production location: Adelaide, South Australia
- Cinematography: Bonnie Elliott
- Editor: Bryan Mason
- Production company: Closer Productions

Original release
- Network: SBS TV
- Release: 1 August – 22 August 2019

The Hunting is an Australian drama series starring Asher Keddie and Richard Roxburgh, screening on SBS TV and SBS on Demand on 1 August 2019. The four-part miniseries was created by Sophie Hyde and Matthew Cormack at Closer Productions, and co-directed by Ana Kokkinos.

== Plot ==
The Hunting tells the story of two high school teachers who discover that students are sharing sexually explicit photos of their under-age friends and peers online. The revelation has consequences for four teenagers, their teachers and families in modern, multicultural Australia.

== Cast ==
- Asher Keddie as Simone
- Richard Roxburgh as Nick
- Sam Reid as Ray
- Jessica De Gouw as Eliza
- Luca Sardelis as Zoe
- Yazeed Daher as Nassim
- Pamela Rabe as Principal De Rossi
- Nicholas Hope as Principal Fischer
- Leah Vandenberg as Ravneet
- Rodney Afif as Rami
- Sachin Joab as Sandeep
- Elena Carapetis as Amanda
- Nathan Page as Sam
- James Lea as Background Artist
- Kavitha Anandasivam as Amandip "Dip"
- Joe Romeo as Marto
- Alex Cusack as Andy
- Jahanvi Bhardwaj as Josephine
- Isabel Burmester as Rosie
- Harrison Evans as Ozzy
- Connor Pullinger as Oliver
- Samuel Mazraeh as Ben
- Lian Takayidza as Ariel

== Episodes ==
No.	Title	Directed by	Written by	Original release date	Australia viewers (millions)
1	"Pics or it didn't happen"	Ana Kokkinos	Matthew Cormack	1 August 2019	N/A
2	"dtf?"	Ana Kokkinos	Niki Aken	8 August 2019	N/A
3	"#shittyboys"	Ana Kokkinos	Niki Aken & Matthew Cormack	15 August 2019	N/A
4	"Sluts"	Sophie Hyde	Matthew Cormack	22 August 2019	N/A

== Themes ==
The Hunting tackles themes of misogyny, privacy, sexuality, online exploitation, sexualisation, toxic masculinity, gender and cyberbullying. Producer/director Sophie Hyde said that the film would explore how teens use technology "within sexual context and reframe the conversation to be about trust and consent, considering how we are culturally responsible".

== Production ==
Originally titled The Hunt, funding for the series by Screen Australia was announced in July 2018. The four-part mini-series was written by Matthew Cormack and Niki Aken, and directed by Ana Kokkinos and Sophie Hyde. Produced by Rebecca Summerton, Sophie Hyde (both of Closer Productions) and Lisa Scott (of Highview Productions), it screened on SBS TV and on SBS On Demand from 1 August 2019.

Production by the Closer Productions team started in Adelaide, on 18 January 2019. Additional funding was provided by the South Australian Film Corporation and SBS.

Adelaide High School was used as a location setting.

== Reception ==
The series had an overwhelmingly positive response, and became the highest-rated TV drama series commissioned by SBS.

Luke Buckmaster, writing for The Guardian, called the series a "very compelling, tense and prickly drama", praising the whole cast and the script, which "hangs together impressively, with admirable depth and nuance".

Wenlei Ma wrote in News.com.au that it addressed the important question "Why isn’t anyone talking about the boys?", and that the series was "wonderfully written..., incredibly tense and the performances are excellent".

Craig Mathieson titled his review in The Sydney Morning Herald: "Forget Home and Away, Australian TV needs more of this teen drama".

Chris Boyd wrote in Screenhub: The Hunting is an extremely rare event in Australian television history. The power and topicality of the story are more than matched by the quality of the writing and craft of the production. It's as hot and urgent as it is considered".

== Accolades ==
- Winner, 2020 AWGIE Award
- Nominated, 2019 AACTA Award for Best Telefeature or Mini Series
