= 52 Tuesdays =

2013 coming of age film

- Theatrical release poster
- Directed by: Sophie Hyde
- Screenplay by: Matthew Cormack
- Story by: Matthew Cormack; Sophie Hyde
- Produced by: Matthew Cormack; Sophie Hyde; Bryan Mason; Rebecca Summerton
- Starring: Tilda Cobham-Hervey; Del Herbert-Jane
- Cinematography: Bryan Mason
- Edited by: Bryan Mason
- Music by: Benjamin Speed
- Distributed by: Closer Productions
- Release dates: 15 October 2013 (Adelaide Film Festival); 14 May 2014
- Running time: 109 minutes
- Country: Australia
- Language: English

52 Tuesdays is a 2013 Australian coming-of-age drama film directed by Sophie Hyde, with the screenplay written by Matthew Cormack and story by Cormack and Hyde. The film centres on a teenage girl dealing with the gender transition of a parent. The film showed at the 2014 Sundance Film Festival, where it was not only nominated for the Grand Jury Prize, but won the Best Director Award. Over the following year it won numerous other awards and garnered global critical acclaim.

== Plot ==
16-year-old Billie lives in suburban Australia. One of her parents comes out to her as a transgender man named James. Billie then learns that James wants Billie to live with her other parent, James's ex-husband Tom, for a year. This restricts the time Billie is together with James to Tuesdays from 16:00 - 22:00, starting on 23 August. The film is divided into the corresponding 52 segments, each covering one Tuesday, and starting with a title card showing the date.

Each Tuesday, after visiting James and before returning to Tom, Billie has secret encounters with two older students, Josh and Jasmine, in an apartment that her uncle Harry allows them to use. Billie films sexual experiments of the threesome.

James meets a setback in his transition when his body does not tolerate testosterone injections, and he has to stop them.

After sending a nude photograph of herself to Jasmine, Billie gets into trouble as this is considered child pornography. The school principal, James, Tom and Jasmine strongly disapprove it. Billie is shocked that James destroys one of her tapes, and refuses further contact with him. Josh does not want physical contact with Billie anymore because of Tom's disapproval.

Later Billie is willing to destroy a remaining tape, but since it is in James's house who she no longer visits, she is dependent on Harry, who finally destroys it for her.

When the year is finished, Billie reconciles with James, and starts living with him again. Also Billie, Josh and Jasmine become friends again.

== Cast ==
- Tilda Cobham-Hervey as Billie
- Del Herbert-Jane as James
- Mario Späte as Harry
- Beau Travis Williams as Tom
- Imogen Archer as Jasmine
- Sam Althuizen as Josh
- Danica Moors as Lisa

== Production ==
52 Tuesdays was filmed in suburban Adelaide over the course of a year, every Tuesday, to fit in with the storyline of the film. This in itself made it unique. It was led by first-time actors and Hyde enjoyed the measure of intimacy and control that she had in the making of the film.

== Release and reception ==
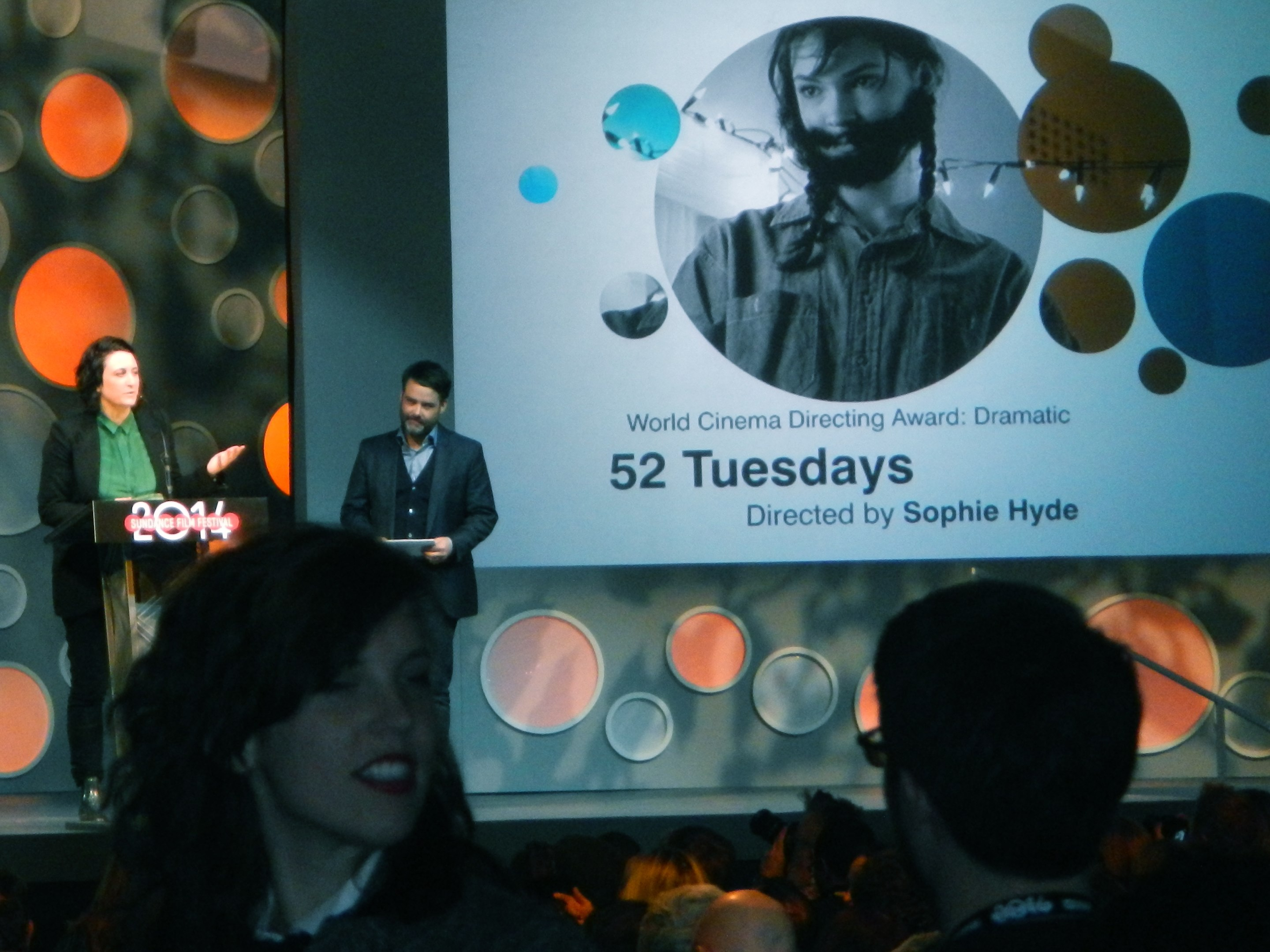
52 Tuesdays won the Directing Award: World Cinema Dramatic at the 2014 Sundance Film Festival.

The film was released theatrically in Australia on 1 May 2014.

=== Critical response ===
52 Tuesdays was met with positive reviews from critics upon its premiere at the 2014 Sundance Film Festival. It has a 90% critics' approval rating based on 39 reviews at Rotten Tomatoes.

Geoff Berkshire said in Variety that the film "Demonstrates a willingness to experiment that bodes well for future endeavors." David Rooney of The Hollywood Reporter in his review said "A thoughtful drama about a mother and daughter whose connection is tested as they both go through intense changes." Tom Clift of Concrete Playground gave a positive review, saying: "Honest, insightful and bravely against the grain, 52 Tuesdays is a magnificent debut for cast and filmmaker alike."

== Accolades ==
| Award | Category | Subject | Result |
|---|---|---|---|
| AACTA Awards (4th) | Best Original Screenplay | Matthew Cormack | Nominated |
| AACTA Awards (4th) | Best Original Screenplay | Sophie Hyde | Nominated |
| AACTA Awards (4th) | Best Editing | Bryan Mason | Nominated |
| Apolo Awards | Best Editing | Bryan Mason | Won |
| Apolo Awards | Best New Director | Sophie Hyde | Nominated |
| Apolo Awards | Best New Actor | Del Herbert-Jane | Nominated |
| Apolo Awards | Best New Actress | Tilda Cobham-Hervey | Won |
| Asia Pacific Screen Award | Best Youth Feature Film | Bryan Mason | Nominated |
| Asia Pacific Screen Award | Best Youth Feature Film | Rebecca Summerton | Nominated |
| Asia Pacific Screen Award | Best Youth Feature Film | Matthew Cormack | Nominated |
| Asia Pacific Screen Award | Best Youth Feature Film | Sophie Hyde | Nominated |
| ADG Award | Best Direction in a Feature Film | Sophie Hyde | Nominated |
| AFCA Awards | Best Director | Sophie Hyde | Nominated |
| AFCA Awards | Best Screenplay | Matthew Cormack | Nominated |
| AFCA Awards | Best Actress | Tilda Cobham-Hervey | Nominated |
| ASE Award | Best Editing in a Feature Film | Bryan Mason | Won |
| AWGIE Award | Best Writing in a Feature Film - Original | Matthew Cormack | Won |
| Berlin International Film Festival | Crystal Bear | Sophie Hyde | Won |
| Berlin International Film Festival | Reader Jury of the "Siegessäule" | Sophie Hyde | Won |
| Berlin International Film Festival | Score Competition | Benjamin Speed | Nominated |
| Berlin International Film Festival | Best Feature Film | Bryan Mason | Nominated |
| Berlin International Film Festival | Best Feature Film | Rebecca Summerton | Nominated |
| Berlin International Film Festival | Best Feature Film | Matthew Cormack | Nominated |
| Berlin International Film Festival | Best Feature Film | Sophie Hyde | Nominated |
| Chéries-Chéris | Grand Prix | Sophie Hyde | Nominated |
| Cleveland International Film Festival | ReelWomenDirect Award for Excellence in Directing by a Woman | Sophie Hyde | Nominated |
| Cork Film Festival | Youth Jury Award | Sophie Hyde | Won |
| Glasgow Film Festival | Audience Award | Sophie Hyde | Nominated |
| FCCA Awards | Best Screenplay | Matthew Cormack | Nominated |
| FCCA Awards | Best Actress | Tilda Cobham-Hervey | Nominated |
| FCCA Awards | Best Editing | Bryan Mason | Nominated |
| Melbourne Queer Film Festival | Best Feature Film | Sophie Hyde | Won |
| International Festival of Independent Cinema Off Camera | Making Way Award | Sophie Hyde | Nominated |
| Sundance Film Festival | Directing Award | Sophie Hyde | Won |
| Sundance Film Festival | Grand Jury Prize | Sophie Hyde | Nominated |
| Tallinn Black Nights Film Festival | Just Film Award - Special Mention | Sophie Hyde | Won |
| Tallinn Black Nights Film Festival | Just Film Award - Best Youth Film | Sophie Hyde | Nominated |
| Inside Out Film and Video Festival (Toronto) | Bill Sherwood Award for Best First Feature | Sophie Hyde | Won |
