= Mercury CX =

Film and television training organisation

- Formation: 1974
- Type: Non-profit association
- Legal status: Charitable
- Headquarters: Lion Arts Centre
- Coordinates: 34°55′23″S 138°35′38″E
- Region served: South Australia
- Products: Film industry support
- Services: Cinema, hosting events and awards, funding emerging filmmakers' projects
- Chairs: Peter Hanlon and Kirsty Stark
- General manager: Sarah Lancaster
- Website: www.mercurycx.org
- Formerly called: Media Resource Centre

Mercury CX, formerly Media Resource Centre (MRC), is a not-for-profit film and television training organisation based in the Lion Arts Centre on the corner of Morphett Street and North Terrace, Adelaide, South Australia, which aims to give screening opportunities to emerging South Australian film, video and digital media artists. It also manages the not-for-profit Mercury Cinema, which shows films by subscription to the Adelaide Cinémathèque film society, screening classic or notable films and hosts film festivals and other events. Mercury CX hosts the Screenmakers Conference and the South Australian Screen Awards.

== History ==
The Media Resource Centre was established in 1974 and is one of the earliest members of the Screen Development Australia (SDA) national network. It moved from its first location at 1 Union Street to a larger location in Pirie Street in the 1980s, where it provided a venue to screen local filmmakers' works as well as other independent, community or hard-to-find international films; it also provided equipment space for filmmakers to work on their projects and network with others.

In 1992 the MRC moved to the purpose-built Lion Arts Centre, located in a refurbished factory in the West End of Adelaide and housing numerous arts organisations, including galleries and theatres. It merged with Commedia, a community media organisation, at the same time. The Mercury and Iris cinemas were created next door and opened by Queen Elizabeth II in 1992.

In 2019 the MRC director was Gail Kovatseff.

During the COVID-19 pandemic in South Australia, the cinema was forced to close for a while from March 2020. During this time, renovations were undertaken, with the foyer transformed into a lounge bar. The organisation was rebranded Mercury CX and a new website launched.

The organisation has struggled to remain solvent, and has relied heavily on public funding by the state government. In 2022 the South Australian Government refused a request for $700,000 to $1.2 million in annual funding, but months later offered $50,000 to help the organisation find a way to keep afloat. A new board started its term on 1 December, led by former South Australian Film Corporation chair Peter Hanlon and producer Kirsty Stark, and including producers Lisa Scott of Highview Productions and Rebecca Summerton of Closer Productions.

== Governance and funding ==
Mercury CX is a membership-based association, which holds charitable status. It has a constitution and a board of directors to oversee its management.

Since December 2022 and as of August 2024 the board is chaired by Peter Hanlon and Kirsty Stark, while the CEO is Karena Slaninka.

The organisation was in the past funded by Screen Australia. As of May 2022 it receives A$250,000 annually from the South Australian Film Corporation specifically to support talent development in the Australian film industry. The Marshall government gave emergency funding of A$300,000 in September 2021 to support ongoing operations. In 2022 Mercury CX submitted a funding request for an ongoing operating budget of A$700,000 to A$1.2 million, but it was refused by the newly-elected South Australian government under Peter Malinauskas, based on a report prepared by the Marshall government. At the AGM on 31 May 2022, members voted unanimously to oppose closing down the organisation. CEO Slaninka said that extra funding was need to help the cinema recover from the effects of the COVID-19 pandemic in South Australia, and that a "Save the Mercury" campaign to raise funds would be launched.

== Description ==
Mercury CX is a not-for-profit incorporated association which provides facilities for career development in the film industry, from entry-level to early career, providing access to equipment, advice and a subsidy programme. It offers production support, professional development and industry and community partnerships. The offices are located in the Lion Arts Centre on the corner of Morphett Street and North Terrace, Adelaide.

== Mercury Cinema ==
The Mercury Cinema building includes its main 186-seat cinema as well as the 36-seat Iris Cinema, situated adjacent to the Lion Arts Centre, facing Morphett Street. As a not-for-profit organisation, there is a film society, Adelaide Cinémathèque, members of which can attend regularly scheduled films. The Iris is available for hire as a venue, and is used for Adelaide Fringe performances as well as for many other uses. The Cinema also runs a series of programmes on a weekly or bi-weekly basis, such as Sunday Sessions and Seniors on Screen, and a school holiday programme.

The Cinema also hosts film festivals, some one-off and some annual occurrences. In the latter group are a programme of the best films from the Flickerfest (a Sydney festival for short films), films from the Adelaide Festival Centre's OzAsia Festival, selected films for the Adelaide Film Festival, and the Iranian Film Festival Australia (which occurs in most of Australia's capital cities).

== Screen Makers Conference ==
The Screen Makers Conference is an annual national conference hosted by the MRC since 2014, and aims to "[bring] together Australia’s writers, directors, producers and other screen creatives to share knowledge, connect with the industry, and pitch projects to the national marketplace". It is regarded as one of two major annual conferences for filmmakers, the other being the Australian International Documentary Conference.

In 2018 the Conference attracted over 200 delegates, including Screen Australia CEO Graeme Mason and Kingston Anderson from the Australian Directors' Guild, independent filmmaker and educator Cathy Henkel, Rowan Woods, currently head of directing at the Australian Film, Television and Radio School, senior managers from several major national TV companies as well as the government-owned broadcasters, the ABC and SBS.

In 2019 it expanded to three days, partnered with television production company Screentime and also included video games in its remit.

== South Australian Screen Awards ==
The Media Resource Centre has run the South Australian Screen Awards (SASAs) since establishing them in 1999, to "exhibit, celebrate and promote the best screen works of the South Australian film industry". These are awarded in conjunction with the Screenmakers' Conference, and in 2019 awarded A$40,000 of prizes, including two new awards: best costume, and best hair & makeup.

2018 Winners
Award	Winner
Best Film	Robert McFarlane: The Still Point
Best Drama	The Big Nothing
Best Comedy	Lucy & DiC
Best Animation	Blue Cherry
Best Documentary	Robert McFarlane: The Still Point
Best Music Video	I'll Accept by Juno
Best Web Series	Goons Inc.
Best Screenplay	Elspeth Trautwein (The Sandpit)
Best Directing	Sara West (Mutt)
Best Cinematography	Maxx Corkindale (Mutt)
Best Editing	Nick Eades (The Sandpit)
Best Female Performance	Jordan Cowan (Mutt)
Best Male Performance	Oscar Redding (Mutt)
Best Production Design	Lauren Murray (The Big Nothing)
Best Sound Design	Josiah Allen & Indianna Bell (Small Town P.D)
Best Music Composition	Cezary Konarski (Zoe)
Mercury Award	Ernie Clark ACS
Young Filmmaker Award	Jordan Cowan
Emerging Producer	Jodie Kirkbride

2017 Winners
Award	Winner
Best Short Film	Smashed
Best Feature Film	Charlotte
Best Drama	Postcards from Nowhere
Best Comedy	Walter
Best Animation	After All
Best Documentary	Komorebi
Best Music Video	In Your Fire (Wasted Wanderers)
Best Web Series	Almost Midnight
Best Screenplay	Jeremy Nicholas (Variations of a Theme of Violence)
Best Directing	Sean Lahiff (Smashed)
Best Cinematography	Maxx Corkindale (Smashed)
Best Editing	Sean Lahiff (Smashed)
Best Non-Narrative	Il Signore Anziano aka The Elderly Gentleman
Best Performance	Mark Coles-Smith (Spin Out)
Best Production Design	Pip Strachan (Maurice's Symphony)
Best Sound Design	Andrew Graue (Smashed)
Best Music Composition	Luke Altmann (Ambergris)
Young Filmmaker Award	Jeremy Nichols
Emerging Producer	Alex Keay
Independent Spirit Award	Stephanie Jaclyn

== Project funding ==
The Mercury CX supports developing South Australian filmmakers via its own programs and in collaboration with other organisations. Its Production Initiative Program (PIP) which funded five shorts and web series in 2020. Selected projects are often then developed in the Mercury CX's career development program, Springboard+ (formerly Springboard).

Since 2021, Mercury CX has participated in the Film Lab: New Voices initiative launched by the South Australian Film Corporation and Adelaide Film Festival (AFF). This program supports emerging filmmakers, with three teams selected for mentoring over an 11-month development period and one team then selected for funding to complete a low-budget feature film which is premiered at the next AFF.

Films funded via Mercury CX programs
Year	Title	Format	Producer	Director
2018	#DogsofAdelaide	Web series	Erin Paterson	Leela Varghese
2018	Dead Centre	Web series	Kurt Roberts	Benno Thiel
2018	Fading	Web series	Jodie Kirkbride	Stephanie Jaclyn
2018	Ice Box	Short	Brendan Skinner & Simon Williams	Nathaniel Schmidt
2018	Thirst	Short	Jodie Kirkbride & Kate Bonney	Kiara Milera
2017	Aquaphobe	Short	Gilbert Kemp-Attrill	Melanie Easton
2017	Chloe	Short	Kate Jarrett	Nick Cowan
2017	Good	Short	Ashleigh Knott	Luke Wissel
2017	Small Town P.D.	Short	Indianna Bell & Paul Forza	Indianna Bell & Josiah Allen
2017	Spider in the Garden	Short	Louise Pascale	Nina Pearce
2017	White Lilies	Short	Kate Jarrett	Lucy Gale
2016	Freemales	Web series	Jodie Kirkbride	Stephanie Jaclyn
2016	Get Prepped	Web series	Sally Hardy, Nathan March, Stuart Sturgess & Annalouise Sortini	Nathan March, Stuart Sturgess & Annalouise Sortini
2016	Perfect Timing	Short	Emily McAllan	Emily McAllan
2016	The Big Nothing	Web series	Claire Bishop, Peter Ninos, Lucy Campbell & Sophie Morgan	Peter Ninos & Lucy Campbell
2016	Space Sushi	Short	Debra Liang	Makoto Koji
2016	The Tiny Home	Short	Cate Elliot & Sophie Morgan	Sophie Morgan
