= Closer Productions =

Film production company in Adelaide, South Australia

- Company type: Private company
- Industry: Film, television
- Founded: 2004; 22 years ago
- Founder: Sophie Hyde & Bryan Mason
- Headquarters: Adelaide, South Australia
- Products: Film and television production
- Website: closerproductions.com.au

Closer Productions is a film and television production company founded by filmmakers Sophie Hyde and Bryan Mason in Adelaide, South Australia, in January 2004. It is known for award-winning feature films such as 52 Tuesdays (2013) and Animals (2019), as well as television series and documentary films.

== History ==
Closer Productions was founded by Hyde and Mason, who are personal as well as professional partners, having both graduated from Flinders University in 1997. They began Closer Productions in 2004 and produced their first work under the Closer banner in 2005.

Writer Matthew Cormack joined the pair soon afterwards, and Matthew Bate came in 2010; both of them are Flinders graduates too. Previously, Bate had his own company, Plexus Films, but after working on separate projects after winning FilmLab funding, with Bate having his short film The Mystery of Flying Kicks, he and the Closer team decided to amalgamate.

Closer Productions was registered as a private company on 28 January 2010. Producer Rebecca Summerton (also a Flinders graduate) joined the company shortly after the merger.

== Description ==
The company is located in the inner Adelaide suburb of Glenside, sharing the historic former administration building of Glenside Hospital with Adelaide Studios, which are managed by the South Australian Film Corporation (SAFC).

The company is self-described as a "collective of film-makers". As of 2021, in addition to the four directors, Hyde, Mason (editor, DOP, producer, director), Cormack (writer, sales/delivery), Summerton (producer), and Bate (writer, director), other members of the team include editor, designer, and visual effects creator Raynor Pettge, director and screenwriter Matt Vesely(another Flinders graduate), and director Maya Newell (Gayby Baby, In My Blood It Runs).

Closer Services creates promotional films for industry clients and projects documenting various aspects of arts and architecture, including for clients such as the Adelaide Festival and the Art Gallery of South Australia (AGSA). They created a series of videos for the 2020 Tarnanthi exhibition at AGSA, which included profiles of Ernabella Arts, Iwantja Arts and Tjala Arts.

== Grants and mentoring ==
In September 2020, Closer Productions and the Adelaide Film Festival announced a "new grants program aiming to broaden accessibility to the Australian filmmaking industry for artists from underrepresented communities". Four selected emerging filmmakers would be awarded A$5,000 as well as the opportunity to participate in three workshops with the Closer Productions team.

== Selected filmography ==
=== Feature fiction ===
- 52 Tuesdays (2013)
- Animals (2019)

=== Television series ===
- Hannah Gadsby's Oz (2014), a 3-part series directed by Bate and featuring comedian and writer Hannah Gadsby
- Fucking Adelaide (2017) comedy drama, for ABC TV. AKA F*!#ing Adelaide and F**king Adelaide.
- The Hunting (2019)
- Aftertaste (2021), created by Matthew Bate and Julie De Fina, directed by Jonathan Brough

=== Short films and documentaries ===
- Beyond Beliefs: Muslims & Non-Muslims in Australia (2007)
- Shut Up Little Man! An Audio Misadventure (2011), documentary/comedy/drama, written and directed by Matthew Bate
- Life in Movement (2011), a documentary about choreographer Tanja Liedtke
- Sam Klemke's Time Machine (2015), feature-length documentary, written and directed by Matthew Bate
- My Best Friend is Stuck on the Ceiling (2015), s short comic film written and directed by Matt Vesely.
- A Field Guide to Being a 12-Year-Old Girl (2017), written and directed by, and starring Tilda Cobham-Hervey
- In My Blood It Runs (2019), feature-length documentary, directed by Maya Newell and others
- Eat the Invaders (2025), ABC TV documentary series about eating invasive species, presented by Tony Armstrong

== Awards ==
- 2011: Life in Movement, winner, Best Work at the 2011 Ruby Awards
- 2011: Life in Movement, winner, Foxtel Australian Documentary Prize
- 2011, Life in Movement, nominated, AACTA Awards, Best Feature Length Documentary and Best Direction in a Documentary
- 2011: Life in Movement, Australian Film Critics Association Awards, Best Documentary
- 2013/4: 52 Tuesdays – multiple wins and nominations
- 2018: Fucking Adelaide, winner, Screen Producers Australia (SPA) Award for Online Series Production of the Year
- 2018: Fucking Adelaide, nominated, APDG Award for Costume Design for a Web Series (Renate Henschke)
- 2018: Fucking Adelaide, nominated, Adobe Award for Production Design for a Web Series (Amy Baker)
