= Azadi (2005 film) =

- Promotional poster
- Directed by: Anthony Maras
- Written by: Anthony Maras
- Produced by: Scott McDonald
- Starring: Rodney Afif; Seleman Haider
- Cinematography: Nick Remy Matthews
- Edited by: Denise Haratzis; Anthony Maras
- Music by: Josh Bennett
- Production company: Mills Street
- Release date: February 2005 (Adelaide Film Festival)
- Running time: 29 minutes
- Country: Australia
- Language: English

Azadi is a 2005 Australian short film written and directed by Anthony Maras, and produced in association with the Australian Film Commission, the Adelaide Film Festival Investment Fund and the South Australian Film Corporation.

The film has earned numerous accolades on the international festival circuit and has screened on broadcast television, festivals and at human rights events.

== Synopsis ==
Azadi follows the plight of an Afghan schoolteacher and his asthmatic son who escape their oppressive Taliban homeland in search of a new life in Australia.

== Cast ==
Actor	Role
Rodney Afif	Amir Afzali
Seleman Haider	Mansur Afzali
Stephen Sheehan	DIMA Officer
Sepideh Fallah	Amir's wife

== Awards and nominations ==
- 2005 Australian Film Institute Awards: Best Short Fiction Film – Nomination
- 2006 St Kilda Film Festival: Judges Special Commendation
- 2005 Palm Springs International Festival of Short Films: Critics and Audience Choice commendation
- 2005 Austin Film Festival: Best Short Film – Nomination
- 2005 Hamptons International Film Festival – Films of Conflict and Resolution Award – Nomination
- 2005 ATOM Awards: Best Short Film – Nomination
