= FIAPF =

Film production organization

- International Federation of Film Producers Associations
- Official Logo
- Abbreviation: FIAPF
- Established: 1933; 93 years ago
- Type: Nonprofit organization
- Headquarters: 41 avenue des Arts 1040 Brussels, Belgium
- Region served: Worldwide
- Members: 37 Producer organizations, 30 Countries, 5 Continents.
- Affiliations: Indian Motion Picture Producers' Association
- Website: www.fiapf.org

The FIAPF (Fédération Internationale des Associations de Producteurs de Films; English: International Federation of Film Producers Associations), created in 1933, is an organization composed of 36 film producers associations from 30 countries. Its Secretariat is located in Brussels, Belgium. FIAPF provides accredition to many international film festivals, including some of the world's most important ones.

== Functions ==
FIAPF helps producers formulate policies and coordinate political action in these key areas:

- Copyright and related intellectual property rights legislation
- Enforcement of IPR legislation and anti-piracy action
- Deployment of digital technologies and their effect on the audiovisual value chain
- Technology standardization process
- Media regulation
- Private and public sector film financing mechanisms
- Trade-related issues

== Members ==
FIAPF members are 34 producer organizations from 27 countries:

Members
(Argentina) Asociación General de Productores Cinematográficos
(Argentina) Instituto Nacional de Cine y Artes Audiovisuales
(Austria) Fachverband der Audiovisions und Filmindustrie
(India) Indian Motion Picture Producers' Association (IMPPA)
(Belgium) Vlaamse Onafhankelijke Film & Televisie Producenten v.z.w. (VOFTP)
(Canada) Canadian Media Producers Association
China Film Producers Association
(Croatia) Croatian Producers Association (HRUP)
(Czech Republic) Audiovisual Producers Association (APA)
(Denmark) Danish Film and TV Producers
(Estonia) Estonian National Producers Union (ERPÜ)
Audiovisual Producers Finland (APFI)
(Germany) Allianz Deutscher Produzenten - Film & Fernsehen e.V.
(Germany) Verband Deutscher Filmproduzenten e.V.
(Iceland) Association of Icelandic Film Producers
(Iran) The Iranian Alliance of Motion Picture Guilds (Khaneh Cinema)
Motion Picture Producers Association of Japan
Film Producers Association of Latvia
Netherlands Audiovisual Producers Alliance (NAPA)
(North Macedonia) Association of Film Producers of Macedonia (MZFP Skopje)
(Nigeria) Association of Nollywood Core Producers (ANCOP)
(Norway) Virke Produsentforeningen
(Poland) Polish Producers Alliance (KIPA)
(Russia) Association of Cinema and Television Producers
Film Producers Guild of Russia
(Slovakia) Slovak Audiovisual Producers Association (SAPA)
(Sweden) Swedish Film Producers Associations
(Switzerland) Association Suisse des Producteurs de Films
(Turkey) Film Yapimcilari Meslek Birligi (Fiyab)
(Turkey) Sinema Eseri Yapimcilari Meslek Birligi (Se-Yap)
(Turkey) Tesiyap Televizyon ve Sinema Film Yapimcilari Meslek Birligi
Film Industry Association of Ukraine (FIAU)
(United Kingdom) Producers Alliance for Cinema and Television (PACT)
(United States) Independent Film & Television Alliance
(United States) Motion Picture Association

Former members include:

Former Members
Screen Producers Australia
(Egypt) Egyptian Chamber of Cinema Industry
(Hungary) Magyar Audiovizualis Producerek Szovetsege (MAPSZ)
(Spain) Federación de Asociaciones de Productores Audiovisuales de España
Film Federation of India
National Film Development Corporation of India

== Accredited film festivals ==
As of 2026, there are 49 film festivals which are accredited by the FIAPF. Its purview spans across 29 countries and 5 continents. The accreditation is shown in a unified singular list, which replaced the former 4-category system.

The accredited film festivals which have shown the highest international impact are recognized as A-Festivals.

=== FIAPF Accredited Festivals ===
'A'-list festivals are marked with an asterisk (*).

Location	Festival	Competition	Formats	Genres
(Argentina) Mar del Plata	Mar del Plata International Film Festival*	Competitive & Non-competitive	Feature film and short film	Various genres
(Armenia) Yerevan	Golden Apricot Yerevan International Film Festival	Competitive & Non-competitive	Feature film and short film	Various genres
(Australia) Sydney	Sydney Film Festival	Competitive & Non-competitive	Feature film and short film	Various genres
(Austria) Kitzbuehel	Kitzbuehel Film Festival	Competitive & Non-competitive	Feature film and short film	Various genres
(Austria) Vienna	Vienna International Film Festival	Non-competitive	Feature film	Various genres
(Bulgaria) Sofia	Sofia International Film Festival	Competitive & Non-competitive	Feature film and short film	Various genres
(Canada) Montreal	Festival du Nouveau Cinéma	Competitive & Non-competitive	Feature film and short film	Various genres
(Canada) Toronto	Hot Docs	Competitive & Non-competitive	Feature film and short film	Documentary
(Canada) Toronto	Toronto International Film Festival*	Non-competitive	Feature film and short film	Various genres
(China) Shanghai	Shanghai International Film Festival*	Competitive & Non-competitive	Feature film and short film	Various genres
(Czech Republic) Karlovy Vary	Karlovy Vary International Film Festival*	Competitive & Non-competitive	Feature film	Various genres
(Dominican Republic) Santo Domingo	Festival de Cine Global Santo Domingo	Competitive & Non-competitive	Feature film and short film	Various genres
(Egypt) Cairo	Cairo International Film Festival*	Competitive & Non-competitive	Feature film and short film	Various genres
(Estonia) Tallinn	Tallinn Black Nights Film Festival*	Competitive & Non-competitive	Feature film and short film	Various genres
(Finland) Tampere	Tampere Film Festival	Competitive & Non-competitive	Short film	Various genres
(France) Annecy	Annecy International Animation Film Festival*	Competitive & Non-competitive	Feature film and short film	Animation
(France) Cannes	Festival de Cannes*	Competitive & Non-competitive	Feature film and short film	Various genres
(France) Clermont-Ferrand	Clermont-Ferrand International Short Film Festival*	Competitive & Non-competitive	Short film	Various genres
(Germany) Berlin	Berlin International Film Festival*	Competitive & Non-competitive	Feature film and short film	Various genres
(Germany) Oberhausen	International Short Film Festival Oberhausen	Competitive & Non-competitive	Short film	Various genres
(India) Bengaluru	Bengaluru International Film Festival	Competitive & Non-competitive	Feature film and short film	Various genres
(India) Goa	International Film Festival of India	Competitive & Non-competitive	Feature film	Various genres
(India) Trivandrum	International Film Festival of Kerala	Competitive & Non-competitive	Feature film	Various genres
(India) Kolkata	Kolkata International Film Festival	Competitive & Non-competitive	Feature film and short film	Various genres
(Iran) Shiraz	Fajr International Film Festival	Competitive & Non-competitive	Feature film	Various genres
(Italy) Milan	Noir in Film Festival	Competitive & Non-competitive	Feature film	Fiction
(Italy) Rome	Rome Film Fest	Competitive & Non-competitive	Feature film	Various genres
(Italy) Turin	Torino Film Festival	Competitive & Non-competitive	Feature film and short film	Various genres
(Italy) Venice	Venice Film Festival*	Competitive & Non-competitive	Feature film and short film	Various genres
(Japan) Tokyo	Tokyo International Film Festival*	Competitive & Non-competitive	Feature film	Various genres
(Kazakhstan) Almaty	Eurasia International Film Festival	Competitive & Non-competitive	Feature film and short film	Other
(Montenegro) Herceg Novi	Herceg Novi Montenegro Film Festival	Competitive & Non-competitive	Feature film and short film	Various genres
(North Macedonia) Skopje	CineDays	Competitive & Non-competitive	Feature film and short film	Various genres
(Poland) Kraków	Kraków Film Festival	Competitive & Non-competitive	Feature film and short film	Various genres
(Poland) Warsaw	Warsaw International Film Festival*	Competitive & Non-competitive	Feature film and short film	Various genres
(Romania) Cluj	Transilvania International Film Festival	Competitive & Non-competitive	Feature film and short film	Various genres
(South Korea) Busan	Busan International Film Festival*	Competitive & Non-competitive	Feature film and short film	Various genres
(Spain) Valencia	Cinema Jove	Competitive & Non-competitive	Feature film and short film	Various genres
(Spain) Gijón	Gijón International Film Festival	Competitive & Non-competitive	Feature film and short film	Fiction
(Spain) Málaga	Malaga Festival	Competitive & Non-competitive	Feature film and short film	Various genres
(Spain) Valencia	Mostra de Valencia – Cinema del Mediterrani	Competitive & Non-competitive	Feature film and short film	Various genres
(Spain) Pamplona	Punto de Vista International Documentary Film Festival	Competitive & Non-competitive	Feature film and short film	Documentary
(Spain) San Sebastián	San Sebastián International Film Festival*	Competitive & Non-competitive	Feature film	Various genres
(Spain) Sitges	Sitges International Fantastic Film Festival of Catalunya	Competitive & Non-competitive	Feature film and short film	Various genres
(Spain) Bilbao	Zinebi - Bilbao International Festival of Documentary and Short Films	Competitive & Non-competitive	Short film	Various genres
(Switzerland) Locarno	Locarno Film Festival*	Competitive & Non-competitive	Feature film and short film	Various genres
(Turkey) Antalya	Antalya Golden Orange Film Festival	Competitive & Non-competitive	Feature film	Various genres
(Ukraine) Kyiv	Molodist – Kyiv International Film Festival	Competitive & Non-competitive	Feature film and short film	Various genres
(United States) Austin	Fantastic Fest	Competitive & Non-competitive	Feature film and short film	Various genres

== Former accredited film festivals ==
The following film festivals used to be accredited by the FIAPF, but withdrew.

Location	Festival
(Australia) Adelaide	Adelaide (International) Film Festival, 2003 edition only
(Colombia) Bogotá	Bogotá Film Festival
(Belgium) Brussels	Brussels International Fantastic Film Festival
(Germany) Frankfurt	Lucas International Children's Film Festival
(Belgium) Ghent	Flanders International Film Festival Ghent
(Norway) Haugesund	Norwegian International Film Festival
(South Korea) Jeonju	Jeonju International Film Festival
(Belarus) Minsk	Minsk International Film Festival
(Canada) Montreal	Montreal World Film Festival (cancelled)
(Russia) Moscow	Moscow International Film Festival
(India) Mumbai	Mumbai International Film Festival
(Belgium) Namur	Festival International du Film Francophone de Namur
(Brazil) São Paulo	Mostra – São Paulo International Film Festival
(Bosnia and Herzegovina) Sarajevo	Sarajevo Film Festival
(Russia) St. Petersburg	Message to Man International Film Festival
(Sweden) Stockholm	Stockholm International Film Festival
(Greece) Thessaloniki	Thessaloniki International Film Festival
(Spain) Valencia	Mostra – Valencia Cinema of the Mediterranean
(Germany) Wiesbaden	goEast Festival of Central and Eastern European Films
(Poland) Wrocław	New Horizons Film Festival

== See also ==
- FIAPF Award
- 55th International Film Festival of India
- Indian Motion Picture Producers' Association
- Busan International Film Festival
