= Lesbian Space Princess =

2025 Australian film

- Theatrical release poster
- Directed by: Leela Varghese; Emma Hough Hobbs
- Written by: Leela Varghese; Emma Hough Hobbs
- Produced by: Tom Phillips
- Starring: Shabana Azeez; Bernie Van Tiel; Gemma Chua-Tran; Richard Roxburgh; Kween Kong; Aunty Donna
- Cinematography: Claire Bishop
- Edited by: Ben Fernandez
- Music by: Michael Darren; Matthew Hadley
- Production companies: Screen Australia; South Australian Film Corporation; Adelaide Film Festival Investment Fund; We Made A Thing Studios
- Distributed by: Umbrella Entertainment
- Release dates: 16 February 2025 (Berlinale); 11 September 2025 (Australia)
- Running time: 87 minutes
- Country: Australia
- Language: English

Lesbian Space Princess is a 2025 Australian adult animated science fiction comedy film written and directed by Emma Hough Hobbs and Leela Varghese in their directorial debuts. It features the voices of Shabana Azeez, Bernie Van Tiel, Gemma Chua-Tran, Richard Roxburgh, Kween Kong and comedy troupe Aunty Donna.

The film had its world premiere at the 75th Berlin International Film Festival on 16 February 2025, where it won the Teddy Award, and was released in Australia on 11 September 2025. The film received positive reviews from critics.

== Plot ==
Anxious and introverted protagonist Saira lives a sheltered life on the planet of Clitopolis, where she is princess, daughter of two neglectful lesbian queens. After she is devastated by a break-up with Kiki, her partner of two weeks, Kiki is kidnapped by Straight White Maliens. The Maliens intend to use her as ransom to steal Saira's labrys and use it to power their "chick magnet", leaving a 24-hour time limit before they will drop Kiki into an acidic "homebrew". Unlike other royal lesbians of Clitopolis, Saira, to her parents' disappointment, has been unable to summon her labrys, a symbol of lesbian power.

Saira steals a "Problematic Ship" to embark on a quest across the galaxy to save Kiki. Along the way, she crashes into a moon after the Ship becomes visibly low on moon crystals. There, she falls into an abandoned moon crystal mine and takes a central crystal. She meets Willow, a former gay-pop idol who left their band because Gay Pop Planet imprisoned them from making indie music. A pink sludge grows as they talk, soon trapping Saira and stabbing her leg. Willow gives encouragement to her, as the sludge is exacerbated by her lack of self-worth. The two narrowly escape after dropping the crystal into what soon devolves into a completely engulfed moon.

The pair then travel to meet a drag queen named Blade, who is on a throne, in hopes of her helping Saira to summon her labrys. Willow tries to find ways to sneak her way into getting Blade's attention, yet Saira scours the party. After talking to a woman who had gone through a similar break-up to her own, she musters the confidence to shout for Blade to lower herself down. Reluctantly, Blade agrees, and helps her learn to be kind to herself. Saira enters her own subconscious, and faces disturbing entities stemming from her experiences with neglect and self-loathing, but she overcomes them and summons her labrys through her crotch. Blade tries to steal Saira's labrys, but is stopped when Willow and Saira fight back. Saira decapitates her with the labrys, yet she falls unconscious.

Willow confesses romantic feelings for Saira through a song, and the two have sex. Their romance is short-lived, though, as they break up after the Maliens lower her time limit to save Kiki, with Saira believing that she needs to prioritise saving her. While nearing the planet of the Straight White Maliens, Saira encounters a giant metal penis that guns down the Ship with semen. Beaten and with the Ship in bad condition, Saira reaches the surface of the planet and gives the Maliens her labrys to rescue Kiki. When Kiki refuses to re-enter a relationship with her, Saira's self-doubts re-emerge, causing her labrys to dematerialise. This causes the Maliens to attack her, but she overcomes her doubts again, and uses the re-summoned labrys to power the Maliens' chick magnet.

The chick magnet does not work, instead killing a random woman, and the Maliens realise that they overvalued their desire for attention from women, and decide to date each other as a throuple. Kiki is left on the planet, as Saira returns to Clitopolis, happily single, having learnt to love herself. The end credits showcase her being more social, going with her mothers to Blade (who is still alive despite being decapitated) for family therapy, receiving Willow's hit album about her and going on new adventures with the Ship (who is no longer problematic, instead being an ally).

== Voice cast ==
- Shabana Azeez as Saira, an introverted princess of Clitopolis who is in a relationship with Kiki, who breaks up with her for being "too needy"
- Bernie Van Tiel as Kiki, a bounty hunter who is kidnapped by villains naming themselves the Straight White Maliens, so they can get Saira to use her Royal Labrys in their "chick magnet"
- Gemma Chua-Tran as Willow, a non-binary goth, singer-songwriter, and spacefarer, whom Saira is romantically attracted to during her journey to save Kiki from kidnappers. Willow uses they/them pronouns.
- Richard Roxburgh as Problematic Ship, the vessel Saira takes to try to save Kiki
- Aunty Donna as the Straight White Maliens, the villains who kidnap Kiki
  - Mark Bonanno as the Leader, leader of the Straight White Maliens
  - Zachary Ruane as Larry, one of the members of the Straight White Maliens
  - Broden Kelly as Josh, one of the members of the Straight White Maliens
- Jordan Raskopoulos as Queen Leanne, one of the mothers of Saira
- Madeleine Sami as Queen Anne, one of the mothers of Saira
- Kween Kong as Blade, a drag queen, and owner of a club, who acts like she is going to help Saira and helps summon her Royal Labrys, but ends up betraying her, trying to seize this precious part of Saira for herself
- Demi Lardner as the DNM Girl, whom Saira meets in the bathroom of a club
- Reuben Kaye as Safety Bubble, that protects Clitopolis from danger

== Production ==
The film was greenlit for production under the South Australian Film Corporation and Adelaide Film Festival's Film Lab: New Voices mentoring and funding initiative, following the inaugural round of the scheme in 2021, which led to sci-fi thriller Monolith premiering at the 2022 Adelaide Film Festival and enjoying international success. The Lesbian Space Princess team were eligible for up to A$600,000 in screen production grant funding for their script.

Lesbian Space Princess is the debut feature film for Emma Hough Hobbs and Leela Varghese, who wrote and directed the film. Hough Hobbs is an artist, and Varghese a former award-winner at Tropfest. The film was produced by Tom Phillips of We Made A Thing Studios. The story is inspired by the filmmakers' own lives. The graphic artists who worked on the film used Toon Boom Harmony, VFX, and high-end compositing. The production team worked at Artisan Post Group's space at Lot Fourteen, Adelaide, who worked on post-production of the Netflix series Stateless and ABC series Aftertaste, among others. The film's soundtrack was composed by Michael Darren and Matthew Hadley, while Ben Fernandez contributed to its editing.

In May 2024, Adelaide Film Festival launched its "Adelaide Film Festival Goes to Cannes" program, partnering with Cannes Film Festival's film market, the Marché du Film, to showcase five local projects in an official presentation; Lesbian Space Princess was one of the five chosen, and Leela Varghese joined nine other emerging filmmakers at Cannes.

In November 2025, in an interview with JoySauce, Varghese and Hobbs said they had been dating one another and applied to an initiative for first-time directors, and were surprised they got picked, with Varghese praising Azeez's talent and voice as "magnetic", noting Azeez had been in "every single short film" she had ever made, and found the film's ascent exciting, "empowering", and "enriching". When asked about awareness of transphobia in feminism when writing the film, Varghese noted that she was painfully aware and was not "afraid for it to be a source of conversation", while calling transphobia in the UK as "really scary". Hughes said she, and Varghese, were conscious of the symbology around the labrys, saying it "used to be a TERF symbol" and that they debated including it, but added it in because "it should belong to all lesbians, including trans lesbians", while noting that Queen Leanne, a trans woman, summons "the labrys in trans colors" and felt that the "positive representation of inclusion was more powerful" than possible negatives. Hughes also said that the film looked like a cartoon but felt "like an anime", calling it a mix of Invader Zim and Adventure Time, with "a really queer lens on it".

== Release ==
Lesbian Space Princess had four sold-out preview screenings at the Adelaide Film Festival on 27 October 2024. In December 2024, it was announced that the film would have its world premiere at the 75th Berlin International Film Festival in the Panorama program on 16 February 2025. It later screened on 5 June 2025 at the 72nd Sydney Film Festival, where it won the Audience Award for "Best Australian Feature".

The film was released in Australian cinemas on 11 September 2025, by Umbrella Entertainment. The film also sold to the United States (Fandor), Canada (Renaissance Media), Germany (Salzgeber), Spain (Selecta Visión), Singapore (Anticipate Pictures), Ukraine (KyivMusicFilm), and the United Kingdom and Ireland (Peccadillo Pictures). It was released in the US on 31 October 2025 and in the UK and Ireland on 19 June 2026, after being previously scheduled to be released on 22 May. The film premiered on various video on demand platforms on 18 November, including Prime Video.

== Reception ==
On the review aggregator website Rotten Tomatoes, 96% of 55 critics' reviews are positive, with an average rating of 7.40/10. The website's consensus reads: "Combining a proudly queer coming-of-age story with a wild sense of humour, Lesbian Space Princess is a raucous animated adventure with a big heart to go along with its rebellious spirit."

Cassie Tongue, writing in The Guardian, gave the film four out of five stars, saying its script is "sly and witty", but that the film's "real power... is that it's a world where both light touches and deep feelings can coexist". Steve Erickson of Gay City News described the film as "delightful" by having a hero triumphing "over heartbreak and sexism" and young adult sensibility, and called it a "splendid comedy" influenced by Revolutionary Girl Utena and Neon Genesis Evangelion, which is "casually multicultural and sex-positive" while focusing on the importance of self-love. Juan Barquin of MovieWeb praised the film for its "charm" and humour, noted the influence of Sailor Moon, Twilight, Revolutionary Girl Utena, Steven Universe, BoJack Horseman, and Rick and Morty (as well as other Adult Swim series) with "overt queerness" and an "irreverent tone", with sequences inspired by anime, and said that the film is designed for viewers "who once thrived on Tumblr and/or AO3", calling it a "terminally online" film.

The National Film and Sound Archive described the film as reframing "science fiction as a space for queer self‑determination" and being campy in such a way that it "blends space opera spectacle with offbeat humour and queer coming-of-age charm," or Prague Reporter describing the film as "sometimes...a little too on-the-nose" but it has a "lot of heart, and takes its axe to queer culture right alongside mainstream sensibilities". Skwigly described the film as a "laugh-out-loud adventure through the far reaches of queer outer space" and a "riotous, candy-coloured joy from start to finish...that embraces LGBTQIA+ and culturally diverse voices". Tara Brady of The Irish Times called the film "scrappy", "funny" and a "small miracle of invention" considering the small budget; he also described the film as "somewhere between Sailor Moon and Rick and Morty", with each frame packed with "visual jokes, LGBTQ references and pop-cultural detours" while imagining a universe where being queer is "simply the chaotic and colourful norm". Brady praised the animation as having a "rough-hewn, heartfelt charm" and stated that even though not every joke works, "the generous, camp sensibility buoys the material".

Lee Wallace said, in The Conversation, that the film was a smart and funny story that explored "the inner spaces of lesbian consciousness and self-affirmation" and said that the film imagines a future where "desire is experienced by the self is more important than who or what it is directed toward". Wallace also asserted that the film turned the science fiction genre "on its head". Carlos Aguilar said, in a review for Variety, that the film, which he called a "sapphic sci-fi animated romp for adults", seems tonally inspired by Adventure Time and Rick and Morty, but thematically aligns closer to Steven Universe, and noted the clear influence of Sailor Moon. Aguilar described the film's world as having characters which aren't as polishing, revealing the "scrappy, independent provenance" of the movie, while stating that the film's comedy goes at topics that are "low-hanging-fruit", and praised animation sequences where Saira deals with her trauma and inner dark thoughts, the vocal performance by Azeez, and the film's "offbeat, hyperaware comedy". Rachel Shatto of The Advocate praised the film as "fun, cheeky, and...unapologetically sapphic" and Scott Roxborough of The Hollywood Reporter called it a "hidden gem" of 2025 that combines "deadpan humor with a heartfelt tale of self-discovery and romance", while smashing apart genres.

In contrast, Lyvie Scott of Inverse described the film as a "surprisingly sweet, bracingly funny, and unapologetically queer remix" of a space adventure, and praised the film for the focus on mental health, but criticised it for being "behind the curve" with a style of series on Cartoon Network in the 2010s like Adventure Time and Rick and Morty, released too late to ride the "wave of edgy adult animation". Laura Venning of Empire gave the film a rating of three out of five stars, noting Rick and Morty as an inspiration for the film, the "hilarious homage" to The Twilight Saga: New Moon, and that the "funniest moments" come from the Straight White Maliens, calling them a "brilliant marriage of performance and character design". She further stated that while the film's humour feels "dated and overly safe" by relying upon "stereotypes or tired gags", making the film a "hit-and-miss", it is hard "not to be charmed by this scrappy, deeply silly sex-positive sci-fi fantasy" and said the film would, without a doubt, "resonate with LGBTQ+ audiences".

David Opie of IndieWire said that the film is a "tongue-in-cheek adventure" with gags and visual jokes throughout, praising the animation as "charming", the focus on self-love, and describing the protagonist Saira battling with anxiety as a strength of the film, saying that the film is influenced by Buffy the Vampire Slayer, Sailor Moon, Adventure Time, The Midnight Gospel and Rick and Morty, while criticising it as clunky at times, with some jokes which fall flat, giving it a rating of B−. In addition, Matt Allen of Filmhound called the film "odd" yet heartfelt, turning the story's adventure into something rewarding where viewers can see the character growth of Saira, but criticising the folk music as not matching the "vibrant animated world" and saying that the 2D animation used making "the film look cheap at times". Allen concludes by saying that the film, on the whole shows viewers that they need to "take an unexpected journey" to break out of their shells. Boyd Van Hoeij of ScreenDaily said that the film's intended audience would pay no mind to the "lack of originality" in the movie's story and weak character development, saying that the film mostly "delivers on other levels", by being appealing and "appropriately poppy" along with a few laughs.

=== Social media reaction ===
Lesbian Space Princess received negative backlash on social media in late August 2026 stemming from online fandoms. Jaime Lang, editor-in-chief of Cartoon Brew said user response, including "out-of-context clips", memes, and unsubstantiated "toxic and abusive" accusations toward the film's creators, looked "coordinated and inorganic-looking" and noted while the film can be criticized, due to its humor and "occasionally clumsy handling of gender," online users were engaging in hate speech and were review bombing the film, contrasting with how audiences had previously responded. Quispe López of Them described the controversy as primarily being about whether the movie is transphobic, particularly around the use of the labrys as a symbol. They also stated that "while some of the criticism comes from queer people, fringe right-wing internet communities have started bombarding the film with negative attention" and that "[q]ueer and trans people online who have reviewed the film are generally split" on whether the film is transphobic. PinkNews's Jack Wetherill had a similar analysis, stating that while some users believed that the portrayal of the character Blade was rooted in transphobia, others disagreed, stating that Blade was a drag queen, not a trans woman, and, as such, could not summon the labrys. This contrasted with Saira's mother, Queen Leanne, who is a trans woman and can summon it with ease.

=== Accolades ===
Award / Film Festival	Date of ceremony	Category	Recipient(s)	Result	Ref.
Adelaide Film Festival	3 November 2024	Audience Award for Feature Fiction	Lesbian Space Princess	Won	
Berlin International Film Festival	23 February 2025	Teddy Award – Best Feature Film	Emma Hough Hobbs and Leela Varghese	Won	
Berlin International Film Festival	23 February 2025	Panorama Audience Award	Emma Hough Hobbs and Leela Varghese	2nd place	
Annecy International Animation Film Festival	14 June 2025	Contrechamp – Best Feature Film	Lesbian Space Princess	Nominated	
Guadalajara International Film Festival	14 June 2025	Best International Animation Feature Film	Lesbian Space Princess	Nominated	
Guadalajara International Film Festival	14 June 2025	Maguey Award – Best Film	Lesbian Space Princess	Nominated	
Guadalajara International Film Festival	14 June 2025	Maguey Jury Award	Lesbian Space Princess	Won	
Sydney Film Festival	15 June 2025	GIO Audience Awards – Best Australian Feature	Lesbian Space Princess	Won	
Octopus Film Festival	12 August 2025	Grand Prize	Lesbian Space Princess	Won	
Rio de Janeiro International Film Festival	12 October 2025	Felix Awards – Best International Feature	Lesbian Space Princess	Won	
Sitges Film Festival	18 October 2025	Best Film (Noves Visions)	Lesbian Space Princess	Won	
Sitges Film Festival	18 October 2025	Best Animated Feature Film	Lesbian Space Princess	Won	
AACTA Awards	4 February 2026	Best Film	Tom Phillips	Nominated	
AACTA Awards	4 February 2026	Best Indie Film	Tom Phillips	Won	
AACTA Awards	4 February 2026	Best Direction	Emma Hough Hobbs, Leela Varghese	Nominated	
AACTA Awards	4 February 2026	Best Screenplay	Emma Hough Hobbs, Leela Varghese	Nominated	
AACTA Awards	4 February 2026	Best Original Music Score	Michael Darren	Nominated	
AACTA Awards	4 February 2026	Best Production Design	Emma Hough Hobbs	Nominated	
AACTA Awards	4 February 2026	Best Original Song	"Here I Go" (Leela Varghese, Gemma Chua-Tran, Michael Darren)	Won	
Film Critics Circle of Australia	11 February 2026	Best Animated Feature	Lesbian Space Princess	Won	
