= 2015 Adelaide Film Festival =

2015 film festival edition

- Opening film: Highly Strung
- Closing film: Youth
- Location: Adelaide, Australia
- Founded: 2002
- Directors: Amanda Duthie
- Festival date: 15–25 October 2015
- Website: adelaidefilmfestival.org

The 7th Adelaide Film Festival was held in Adelaide, South Australia, from 15 to 25 October 2015.

== Description ==
Amanda Duthie was the Festival Director of the 7th edition of the festival, which ran from 15 to 25 October 2015.

On the opening night of the festival, director and screenwriter Andrew Bovell received the 2015 Don Dunstan Award for his contribution to the Australian film industry.

The festival opened with Scott Hicks's documentary film Highly Strung and closed with Paolo Sorrentino's drama film Youth.

More than 180 feature films were screened at the festival, 40 of which were Australian films, 24 South Australian films and total of 51 countries were represented at the Festival.

== Competition ==
=== Jury ===
The members of the International Feature Jury were:

- Christian Jeune, French Director of the Film Department at Cannes
- Annemarie Jacir, Palestinian Director of Philistine Films
- Maggie Lee, American Chief Asia Film Critic, Variety
- Sophie Hyde, Australian director and producer, of Closer Productions

=== In competition ===
The Foxtel Movies International Award for Best Feature Film at the Festival was won by Neon Bull.

The Flinders University Documentary Award was awarded to Canadian director Amber Fares for Speed Sisters.

Girl Asleep won the 2015 Adelaide Film Festival Best Feature People Choice's Award. Holding the Man documentary, Remembering the Man won the People's Choice Award for Best Documentary, while the most popular short was Meryl Tankard's Michelle's Story.

The following films were selected for the In Competition section:

International Feature Competition

English title	Original title	Director(s)	Production country/countries
Carol	Carol	Todd Haynes	United States, United Kingdom
Freeheld	Freeheld	Peter Sollett	United States
Looking for Grace	Looking for Grace	Sue Brooks	Australia
Gold Coast	Guldkysten	Daniel Dencik	Denmark, Sweden, Ghana
Lamb	Lamb	Yared Zeleke	Ethiopia, France, Germany, Norway, Qatar
Neon Bull	Boi neon	Gabriel Mascaro	Brazil
Office	오피스 Opiseu	Hong Won-Chan	South Korea
316	316	Payman Haghani	Iran
Father	Babai	Visar Morina	Kosovo, Germany
Tanna	Tanna	Bentley Dean and Martin Butler	Australia

Documentaries

English title	Original title	Director(s)	Production country/countries
Brand: A Second Coming	Brand: A Second Coming	Ondi Timoner	United Kingdom
Heart of a Dog	Heart of a Dog	Laurie Anderson	United States
He Named Me Malala	He Named Me Malala	Davis Guggenheim	United States
I Am Belfast	I Am Belfast	Mark Cousins	Australia
Ice and the Sky	La Glace et le ciel	Luc Jacquet	France
The Pearl Button	El botón de nácar	Patricio Guzmán	Chile
The Propaganda Game	The Propaganda Game	Alvaro Longoria	Spain
Remembering The Man	Remembering The Man	Nickolas Bird and Eleanor Sharpe	Australia
Sherpa	Sherpa	Jennifer Peedom	Australia
Speed Sisters	Speed Sisters	Amber Fares	Canada, United Kingdom

== Special screenings ==
Special Events

English title	Original title	Director(s)	Production country/countries
Highly Strung	Highly Strung	Scott Hicks	Australia
A Month of Sundays	A Month of Sundays	Matthew Saville	Australia
The Dressmaker	The Dressmaker	Jocelyn Moorhouse	Australia
Spear	Spear	Stephen Page	Australia
Girl Asleep	Girl Asleep	Rosemary Myers	Australia
Sam Klemke’s Time Machine	Sam Klemke’s Time Machine	Matthew Bate	Australia
Bad Boy Bubby	Bad Boy Bubby	Rolf de Heer	Australia
