= Nick Remy Matthews =

British-born, Australian-raised cinematographer

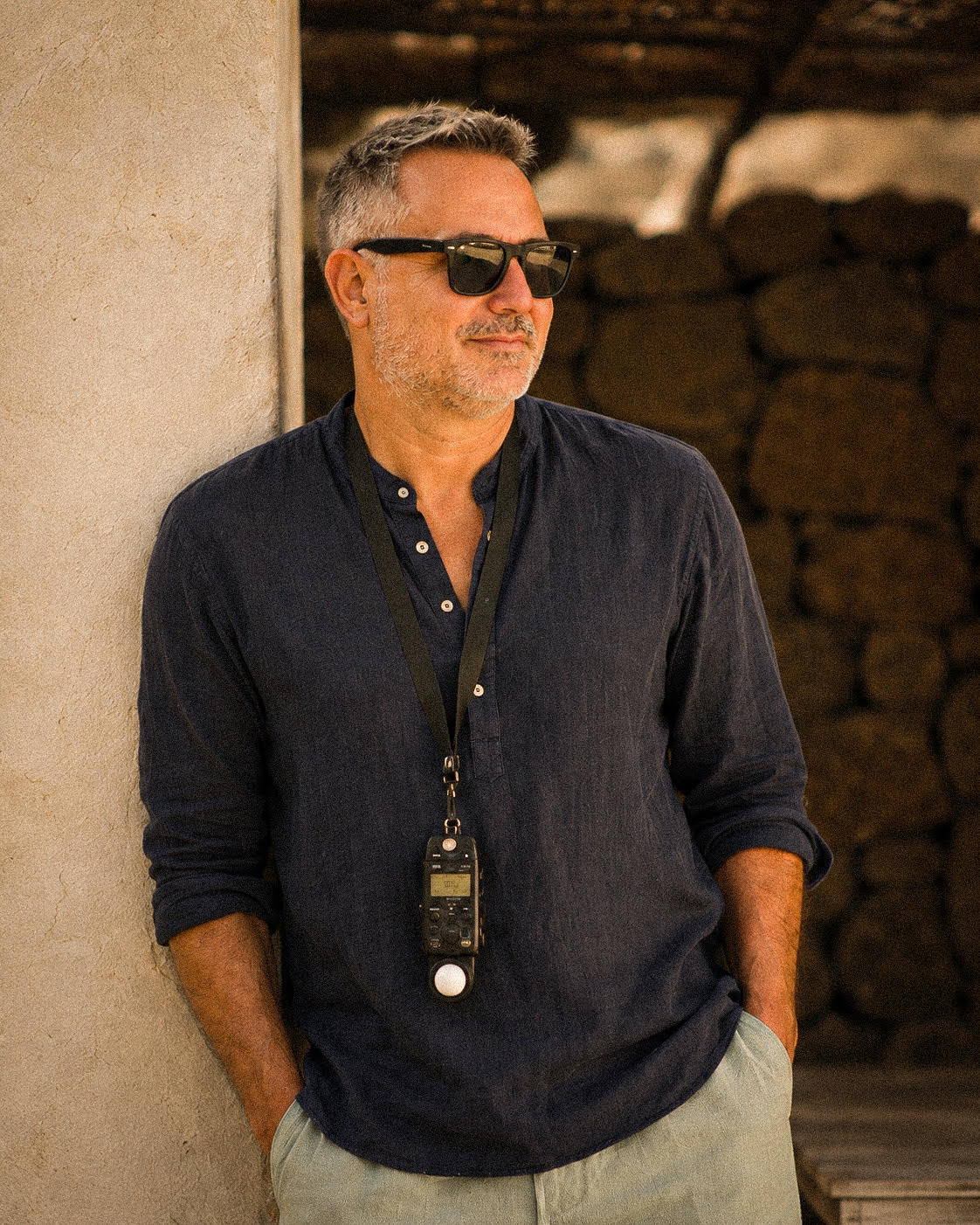
- Born: Aylesbury, Buckinghamshire, United Kingdom
- Education: Flinders University of South Australia
- Occupation: Director of Photography

Nick Remy Matthews, ACS, is a British-born, Australian-raised director of photography, based in Europe. In 2020 he was named "Cinematographer of the Year" by the Australian Cinematographers Society. He was also named by Variety as one of the "10 Cinematographers to Watch" in 2019 for his work on Hotel Mumbai, a factual action drama depicting the Mumbai terror attacks, directed by long time collaborator Anthony Maras. The film stars Dev Patel, Armie Hammer, Nazanin Boniadi, Anupam Kher, Suhail Nayyar, Jason Isaacs, Natasha Liu Bordizzo and Tilda Cobham-Hervey and premiered at the Toronto International Film Festival on 7 September 2018 where Matthews was singled out for praise for his work on the film. Rolling Stone declare that "Even in the chaos of bullets and bombs — kudos to ace cinematographer Nick Remy Matthews — Maras creates a sense of actual lives hanging in the balance.". The Hollywood Reporter also praises the "...kinetic cinematography..." that enhances "...the idea that these are real events.". Variety describes the film as "Stunningly framed and photographed..." and as having a "...visual striking aesthetic."Washington Square News describes the film's cinematography as spanning "...cramped utility closets and breathtaking skylines, a visual treat from beginning to end."

Following Hotel Mumbai, his cinematography credits have included feature films and television productions in the United Kingdom, Europe and the United States. He was cinematographer on the science-fiction thriller I.S.S., directed by Gabriela Cowperthwaite and starring Ariana DeBose. He subsequently photographed the Lionsgate horror film Bagman, directed by Colm McCarthy and starring Sam Claflin. Matthews was also cinematographer on the survival thriller Last Breath, directed by Alex Parkinson and starring Woody Harrelson, Simu Liu and Finn Cole. In 2025 he reunited with Hotel Mumbai director Anthony Maras as second unit director on the Second World War drama Pressure, starring Andrew Scott, Brendan Fraser and Kerry Condon.

Matthews' television work includes the Norwegian political thriller Furia, directed by Magnus Martens, and the British crime drama Gangs of London, for which he photographed two episodes directed by Farren Blackburn. He subsequently served as cinematographer on episodes four and five of the ITV espionage thriller Secret Service, starring Gemma Arterton and directed by Blackburn.

== Early life ==
Matthews was born in the United Kingdom and raised in Adelaide, South Australia, to a British father and an Indian-born Anglo-Indian mother. His father was an aeronautical engineer and his mother an English and drama teacher. Matthews attended the progressive Marbury School in the Adelaide Hills on a scholarship, where his contemporaries included singer-songwriter Sia. He later attended Flinders University, studying film-making and literature before beginning his career in the film industry in the United Kingdom as a video trainee on the HBO miniseries Band of Brothers, executive produced by Steven Spielberg and Tom Hanks.

== Early works ==
In 2010, he won an AFI Award for his cinematography on the short film The Kiss, directed by Ashlee Page. In the same year he photographed Anthony Maras's AFI award-winning short The Palace, the two having collaborated a few years earlier on Maras' other AFI winning short Spike Up.

== Select Filmography ==
=== Film ===
Year	Title	Director	Notes
2006	Modern Love	Alex Frayne	
2006	2:37	Murali K. Thalluri	
2009	Broken Hill	Dagen Merrill	
2011	The Palace	Anthony Maras	Short film
2018	Hotel Mumbai	Anthony Maras	
2018	The Chaperone	Michael Engler	
2020	The Man in the Woods	Noah Buschel	
2020	Love, Weddings & Other Disasters	Dennis Dugan	
2021	SAS: Red Notice	Magnus Martens	
2021	The Seventh Day	Justin P. Lange	
2023	I.S.S.	Gabriela Cowperthwaite	
2024	Bagman	Colm McCarthy	
2025	Last Breath	Alex Parkinson	
2026	Zipline	Magnus Martens	
2026	Pressure	Anthony Maras	Second unit director

=== Television ===
Year	Title	Director	Notes
2021	Furia	Magnus Martens	5 episodes
2022	The Bastard Son & The Devil Himself	Colm McCarthy	4 episodes
2023	Furia	Magnus Martens	2 episodes, season 2
2024	Gangs of London	Farren Blackburn	2 episodes, season 3
2026	Secret Service	Farren Blackburn	2 episodes
2026	The Only Suspect	Farren Blackburn	4 episodes

== Selected awards ==
Year	Award	Category	Work	Result
2025	IFFA Awards	Best Cinematography	Last Breath	Won
2020	Australian Cinematographers Society National Awards	Australian Cinematographer of the Year	Hotel Mumbai	Won
2019	Variety	10 Cinematographers to Watch	Hotel Mumbai	Honoree
2014	Austin Film Festival	Dark Matters Feature Jury Award	One Eyed Girl	Won
2012	St Kilda Film Festival	Best Achievement in Cinematography	Paper Planes	Won
2012	Flickerfest	Best Cinematography	Collision	Won
2012	Australian Cinematographers Society National Awards	Golden Tripod – Fictional Drama Shorts	The Palace	Won
2011	Flickerfest	Miller Australia Award – Best Cinematography in an Australian Short Film	The Kiss	Won
2010	Australian Film Institute Awards	Outstanding Achievement in Short Film Screen Craft	The Kiss	Won
2007	Australian Cinematographers Society National Awards	Golden Tripod	Azadi	Won
