= Emma Hough Hobbs =

Australian animator and filmmaker

- Education: Flinders University
- Occupations: Animator; filmmaker; production designer
- Known for: Lesbian Space Princess (2025)
- Partner: Leela Varghese

Emma Hough Hobbs is an Australian animator, filmmaker, and production designer. They (Note: Hough Hobbs uses she/they pronouns. This article uses they/them for consistency.) are best known for co-writing and co-directing the 2025 animated comedy film Lesbian Space Princess, which won the Teddy Award for Best Feature Film at the 75th Berlin International Film Festival.

== Education ==
Hough Hobbs completed their studies at Flinders University in 2017 with the Chancellor’s Letter of Commendation. The following year, the Fleurieu Film Festival named them among its young inspiring directors

== Career ==
Hough Hobbs works across animation, live-action filmmaking, and production design. Their short film On Film, made under the inaugural Hanlon-Larsen Fellowship, screened at SXSW Sydney in 2023 and won Best Animation at the South Australian Screen Awards.

As a props master, Hough Hobbs has worked on feature films, including Gold and Talk to Me.

=== Lesbian Space Princess ===
Lesbian Space Princess is an animated comedy feature co-written and co-directed by Hough Hobbs with Leela Varghese and produced by Tom Phillips (We Made a Thing Studios). It is the first feature-length animated film produced in South Australia and was one of three Australian features selected for the 2025 Berlinale.

The film premiered at the Berlinale in February 2025, where it won the Teddy Award for Best Feature Film and placed second in the Panorama Audience Award. It subsequently received seven nominations at the 2025 AACTA Awards, including Best Film.

== Recognition ==
In 2025, Hough Hobbs was a nominee for the Elle Australia Next Gen Award, and was nominated for the Frank Ford Memorial Young Achiever Award at the Ruby Awards.

== Personal life ==
Hough Hobbs is queer and uses she/they pronouns. They are based in Adelaide. They are dating filmmaker and comedian Leela Varghese, with Hobbs recalling they both made the decision to apply to "an initiative to give first-time feature directors," from under-represented groups, for their film Lesbian Space Princess.

== Filmography ==
Year	Title	Role	Notes
2023	On Film	Director, writer	Short film
2025	Lesbian Space Princess	Co-director, co-writer	With Leela Varghese

== Awards and nominations ==
Year	Award	Category	Work	Result
2020	Hanlon Larsen Screen Fellowship		‘Film On Film‘ (Working title)	Won
2023	South Australian Screen Awards	Best Animation	On Film	Won
2024	Adelaide Film Festival	Audience Award for Feature Fiction	Lesbian Space Princess	Won
2025	Berlin International Film Festival	Teddy Award for Best Feature Film	Lesbian Space Princess	Won
2025	Berlin International Film Festival	Panorama Audience Award	Lesbian Space Princess	2nd place
2025	AACTA Awards	Best Film	Lesbian Space Princess	Nominated
2025	Elle Australia	Next Gen Award	—	Nominated
2025	Ruby Awards	Frank Ford Memorial Young Achiever Award	—	Nominated
