= The Palace (2011 film) =

- Directed by: Anthony Maras
- Written by: Anthony Maras
- Produced by: Anthony Maras; Kate Croser; Andros Achilleas
- Starring: Erol Afşin; Kevork Malikyan; Tamer Arslan; Daphne Alexander; Christopher Greco
- Cinematography: Nick Remy Matthews
- Edited by: Anthony Maras
- Music by: Argyro Christodoulides
- Production companies: AntHouse Films; Cyan Films; SeaHorse Films
- Release date: 1 March 2011 (Adelaide Film Festival)
- Running time: 17 minutes
- Countries: Cyprus; Australia
- Languages: Turkish, Greek

The Palace is a 2011 Cypriot–Australian thriller short film, written and directed by Anthony Maras. It premiered on 1 March 2011 at the Adelaide Film Festival, and won short film awards at the Sydney Film Festival, Adelaide Film Festival, and Melbourne International Film Festival, among others.

== Synopsis ==
The film is set during the 1974 Turkish invasion of Cyprus, focusing on a Greek family's attempts to hide from the Turkish forces.

== Cast ==
- Erol Afşin as Private Ömer Argun
- Kevork Malikyan as Sergeant Kerem Akalın
- Tamer Arslan as Private Mehmet Evgin
- Daphne Alexander as Stella
- Christopher Greco as Taki
- Monica Vassiliou as Eleftheria
- Vrahimis Petri as Haydar
- Kyriakos Theodossiou as Andreas
- Maria Marouchou as Anna

== Production ==
The Palace, described as a drama and thriller, was produced by Ant House Productions, Cyan Films, and SeaHorse Films.

It was filmed in 2010. Cinematography was by Nick Matthews and Julie Ryan executive produced the film.

The "palace" scenes were filmed at the Hadjigeorgakis Kornesios Mansion, a landmark Ottoman era residence that now serves as a museum administered by the Department of Antiquities in the southern Greek part of Nicosia.

== Release ==
The Palace premiered on 1 March 2011 at the Adelaide Film Festival.

== Reception ==
The Palace received strong critical and audience acclaim.

At the 2011 Melbourne International Film Festival Morgan Spurlock, American director of the acclaimed 2004 documentary film Super Size Me, called The Palace "One of the best short films I've ever seen..."

Peter Krausz, chair of the Australian Film Critics Association, wrote "This is pure film-making to the highest degree..."

Blake Howard from The Co-Op Post called the film "one of the most emotionally affective and powerful short films that I’ve ever seen".

Lukey Folkard at Australian Film Review praised the film as "one of the most impressive and ambitious Australian shorts I've seen at the Sydney Film Festival so far. Or ever."

Box Office magazine's Pete Hammond called the film riveting, suspenseful first class filmmaking".

Cine Outsider's Timothy E. Raw wrote "Director Maras' choke-hold on the audience only tightens, suspense building not to a point of release, but asphyxiating hysteria ... sixteen minutes of non-stop action that rivals the highest Hollywood standards and on more than one occasion surpasses them with blitzkrieg duck n' cover staging".

Filmoria's Richard Lennox wrote "What’s so special about The Palace is its ability to show both sides of the horror of war and at an essence the spirit of humanity against the atrocities of war ... an outstanding film which echoes a quality set by war films such as The Hurt Locker in style. Thought provoking, tense and thoroughly recommended".

== Awards and nominations ==
The Palace won Best Short Fiction Film and Best Screenplay in a Short Film in the 2012 AACTA Awards. It also won top honours at a number of other film festivals and awards, including the 2012 Beverly Hills Film Festival and 2012 Flickerfest International Festival of Short Films (Best Australian Short Film).

=== Awards ===
- 2012 AACTA Awards: Best Short Fiction Film
- 2012 AACTA Awards: Best Screenplay in a Short Film
- 2012 Beverly Hills Film Festival: Best Short Film
- 2012 Beverly Hills Film Festival: Best Director
- 2012 Flickerfest International Short Film Festival: Best Australian Short Film
- 2012 Shorts Film Festival: Golden Shorts - Best Short Film
- 2012 Australian Film Festival: Best Short Film
- 2011 IF Awards: Rising Talent Award
- 2011 Sydney Film Festival: Best Short Film
- 2011 Melbourne International Film Festival: Best Australian Short Film
- 2011 Adelaide Film Festival: Best Short Film
- 2012 Vollywood Film Festival: Best Short Film
- 2012 SA Screen Awards: Best Film
- 2012 SA Screen Awards: Best Drama
- 2012 SA Screen Awards: Best Direction
- 2012 SA Screen Awards: Best Screenplay
- 2012 SA Screen Awards: Best Cinematography
- 2012 SA Screen Awards: Best Editing
- 2012 Australian Cinematography Society Awards: Golden Tripod

=== Nominations ===
- 2011 Australian Writers' Guild Awards: Best Short Film Screenplay
- 2011 Australian Screen Editors Awards: Best Editing in a Short Film

=== Official selection – film festivals ===
- Adelaide Film Festival 2011
- Telluride Film Festival 2011
- Sydney Film Festival 2011
- Melbourne International Film Festival 2011
- Santa Barbara International Film Festival 2012
- Valladolid International Film Festival 2012
