= Wairoa, Aldgate =

Historic house in Aldgate, South Australia

Coordinates: 35°00′40″S 138°43′42″E

Wairoa is a heritage-listed home and garden located in the Adelaide Hills situated at 160 Mount Barker Road between Aldgate and Stirling in South Australia. It was for over three decades the home of Marbury School.

== History ==
The 13-hectare (32-acre) property was purchased in 1888 by William Horn, and most of the house had been completed by the early 1890s.

Occupied by Marbury School between 1972 and 2004, the home afterwards was converted to a community title and was maintained by a group of families. The gardens have been on occasion opened to the public as part of the Australian Open Garden Scheme, and also hired out for weddings. It was put on the market in 2018 as a private dwelling.

The house and associated buildings were listed on the South Australian Heritage Register with effect from 29 June 1989.

== Timeline of ownership ==
The property has been owned/occupied by:

1888 –	1896	William Horn
1896 –	1941	Tom Elder Barr-Smith and family
1941 –	1965	Daughter Joanna Lang Barr-Smith, Lady Gosse (1886–1965) (Married Sir James Hay Gosse (1876–1952) in 1907)
1965 –	1972	Screenings Pty Ltd
1972 –	2004	Marbury School, Aldgate
2004 –	2007	Maintained by a group of local families
2007 –	2018	Community titled; Wendy and Richard Bray, and Kirsty and Ian Dodd.
2018 –	2021	On the market, as a private 10-bedroomed dwelling with extensive grounds sold to J. Smigielski
