= William Horn =

Australian politician

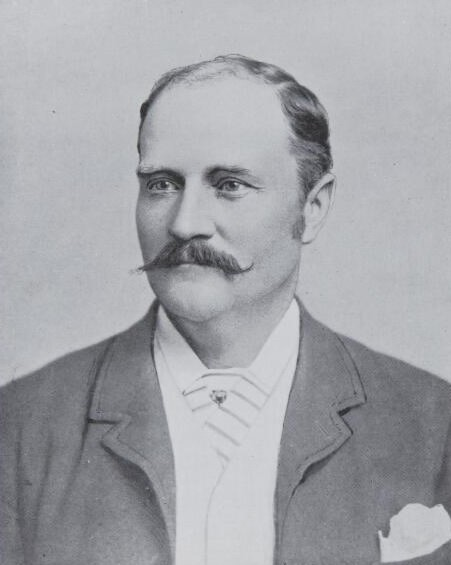

Member of the South Australian House of Assembly for Flinders
- In office 1887–1893

Personal details
- Born: 26 February 1841 Menaroo, New South Wales
- Died: 23 December 1922 (aged 81) London, UK

William Austin Horn (1841–1922) was an Australian mining magnate, pastoralist, politician, author, sculptor and philanthropist. Somewhat eccentric, in 1892 he was the donor of a copy of Antonio Canova's Venus, Adelaide's then controversial first public statue, which is still on display on North Terrace, Adelaide. Horn also built Wairoa, Aldgate, known for its magnificent gardens and captured in a watercolour by William Tibbits.

== Family ==
Horn was born 26 February 1841 at Menaroo (an old name for the Monaro district), New South Wales, to Edward Kirk Horn, a storekeeper, and his wife Emily, née Austin. The family moved to South Australia in 1852, where Horn was educated at the Collegiate School of St Peter.

On 24 September 1879 in St Andrews Church, Walkerville, he married Penelope Elizabeth Belt; they had two daughters and six sons.

In 1896 he sold Wairoa and relinquished all of his official positions in Adelaide. From 1898 he lived at Wimbledon Park House in England. He returned briefly to Adelaide in 1901, and in 1907 to sell his Walkerville house, Holmwood. He held that "an Australian is simply an Englishman born in the sun". He died on 23 December 1922 in London.

=== Extended family ===
Edward Kirk Horn (c. 1809 – March 1882) was married to Emily Horn, née Austin. Their children included:

- Edward Austin Horn (17 November 1839 – 8 August 1869), eldest son, married Elizabeth Mary Palmer on 30 June 1866
- William Austin Horn (26 February 1841 – 23 December 1922)
- Frances Austin "Fanny" Horn (17 April 1844 – ), youngest daughter, married Walter Frampton on 26 January 1867, left for England.
- Richard Austin Horn (22 May 1846 – suicide 18 April 1891) manager of Hart Bros' (John Hart jr (1848–1881) and C. H. T. Hart) property "Beefacres" (once owned by Ned Bagot), near Campbelltown in 1880. He was married to Florence Emily Horn (c. 1853 – 9 February 1880). Their only surviving child was Helen Austin Horn (1878–1933). Horn was succeeded at "Beefacres" in 1881 by J. L. Thompson, formerly of the Dookie experimental farm in Victoria.
- Thomas Sutherland Horn (2 February 1849 – 19 March 1914)
- Percival Austin "Percy A." Horn (17 February 1851 – 16 January 1927)
- Charles Austin Horn (30 March 1855 – 23 January 1928) married Letitia Morris, daughter of H. T. Morris of Anlaby, on 20 April 1882. They left for England in April 1902 and never returned.

- Charles Austin Horn (born 1894)
- Austin Robina Horn (born 1899)

Thomas Sutherland Horn and Richard Austin Horn were members of Goyder's expedition to the Northern Territory 1868–1869

== Mining interests ==
Copper deposits had earlier been discovered in the Yorke Peninsula region at Wallaroo, and a further discovery was made nearby in 1861 on the property of pastoralist Walter Watson Hughes. On learning that news of the discovery had been leaked to another party, Hughes dispatched the young William Horn on a 22-hour horse ride to successfully register the claim in Adelaide. This claim became the prosperous Wheal Hughes, at Moonta.

== Politician ==
Horn was the member for Flinders in the South Australian House of Assembly from 1887 until 1893.

== Philanthropy ==
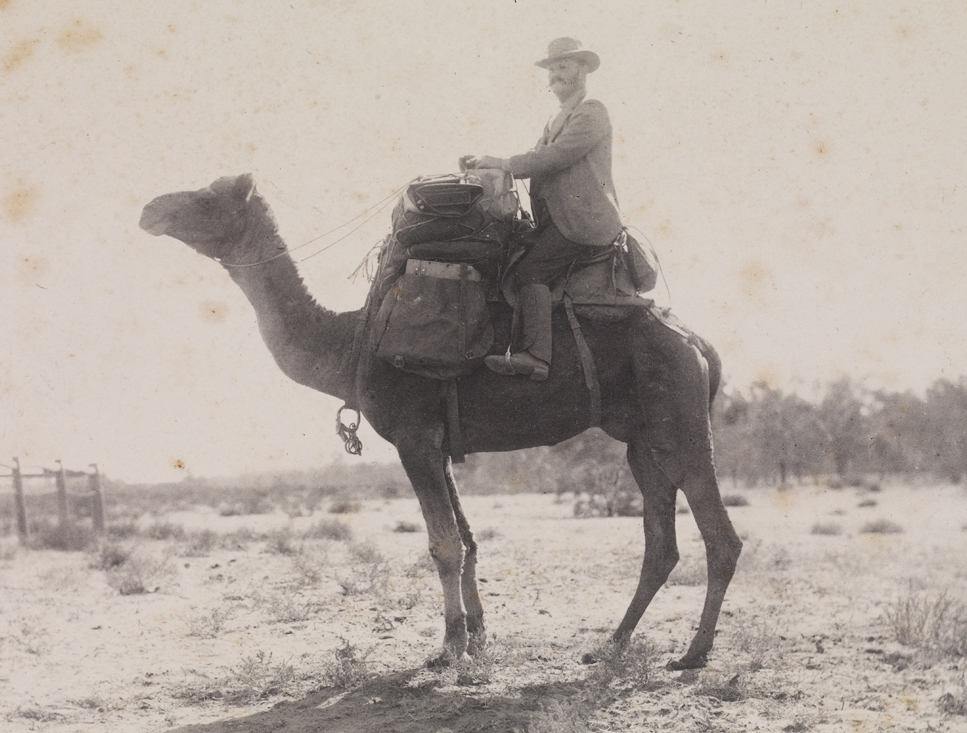
Horn on a camel during his 1894 expedition

In 1890 he gave the National Gallery of South Australia the famous Heinrich Heuzenroeder collection of coins, comprising 11,000 specimens, some of which were Roman.

He equipped and sponsored the Horn Scientific Expedition of 1894, the first primarily scientific expedition to study the natural history of Central Australia.

He donated three statues to Adelaide: 'Venus by Canova' on North Terrace; the Farnese 'Hercules' in Pennington Garden west; and 'The Athlete' in Angas Gardens.

=== Statue: Venere Di Canova ===
Venus by Canova was donated by Horn in 1892. Somewhat controversial at the time of its unveiling in 1892, this piece was the first of Adelaide's street statues. It is a copy in Carrara marble of the statue of Venus by Antonio Canova – the original is at the Pitti Palace in Florence. (Photo of the original.) – Pedestal of Sicilian and Kapunda marble. Executed by Fraser & Draysey. Presented by Mr W A Horn. Unveiled 3 September 1892, by His Worship the Mayor (F.W. Bullock, Esq.).

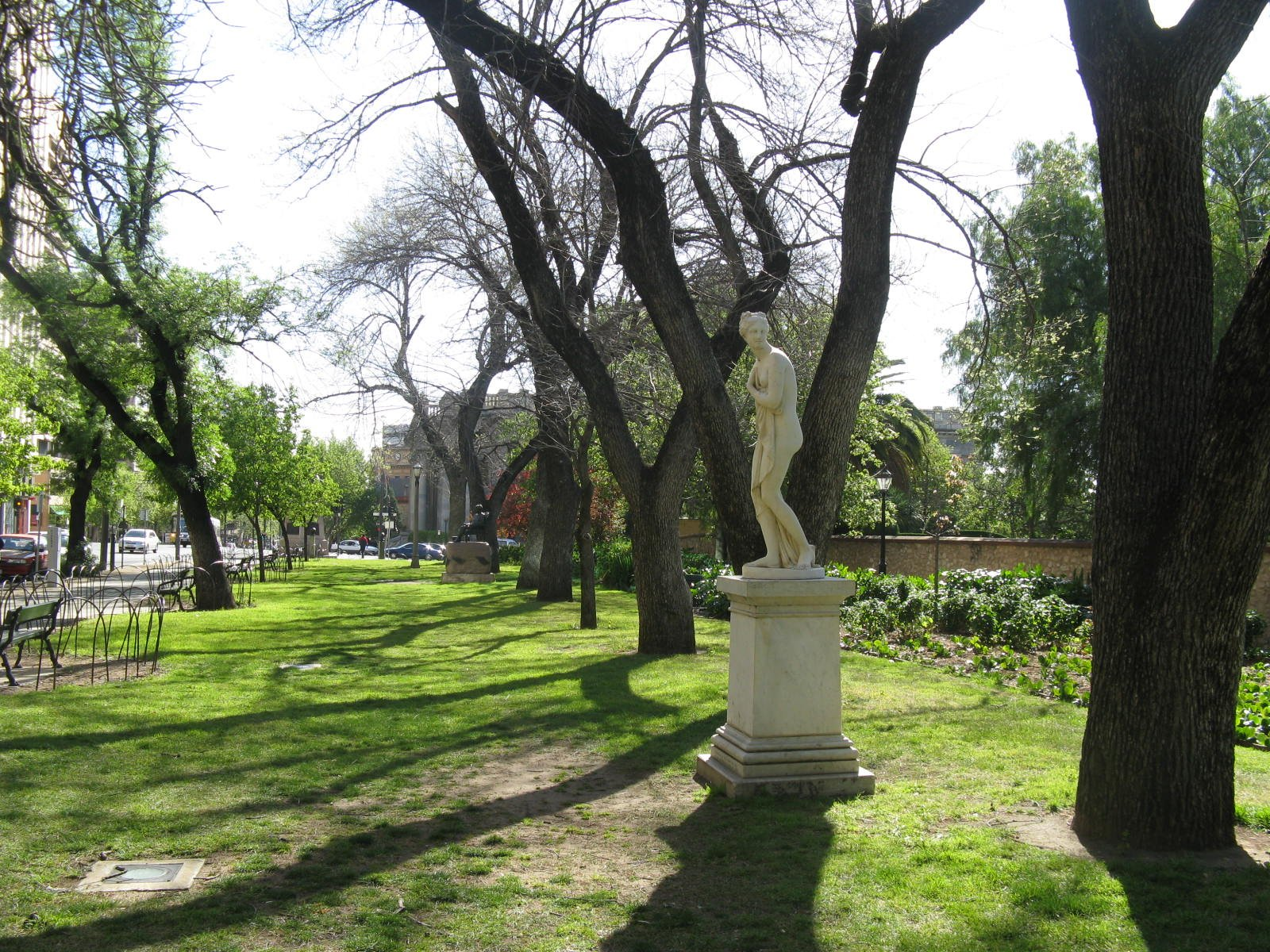
Looking west

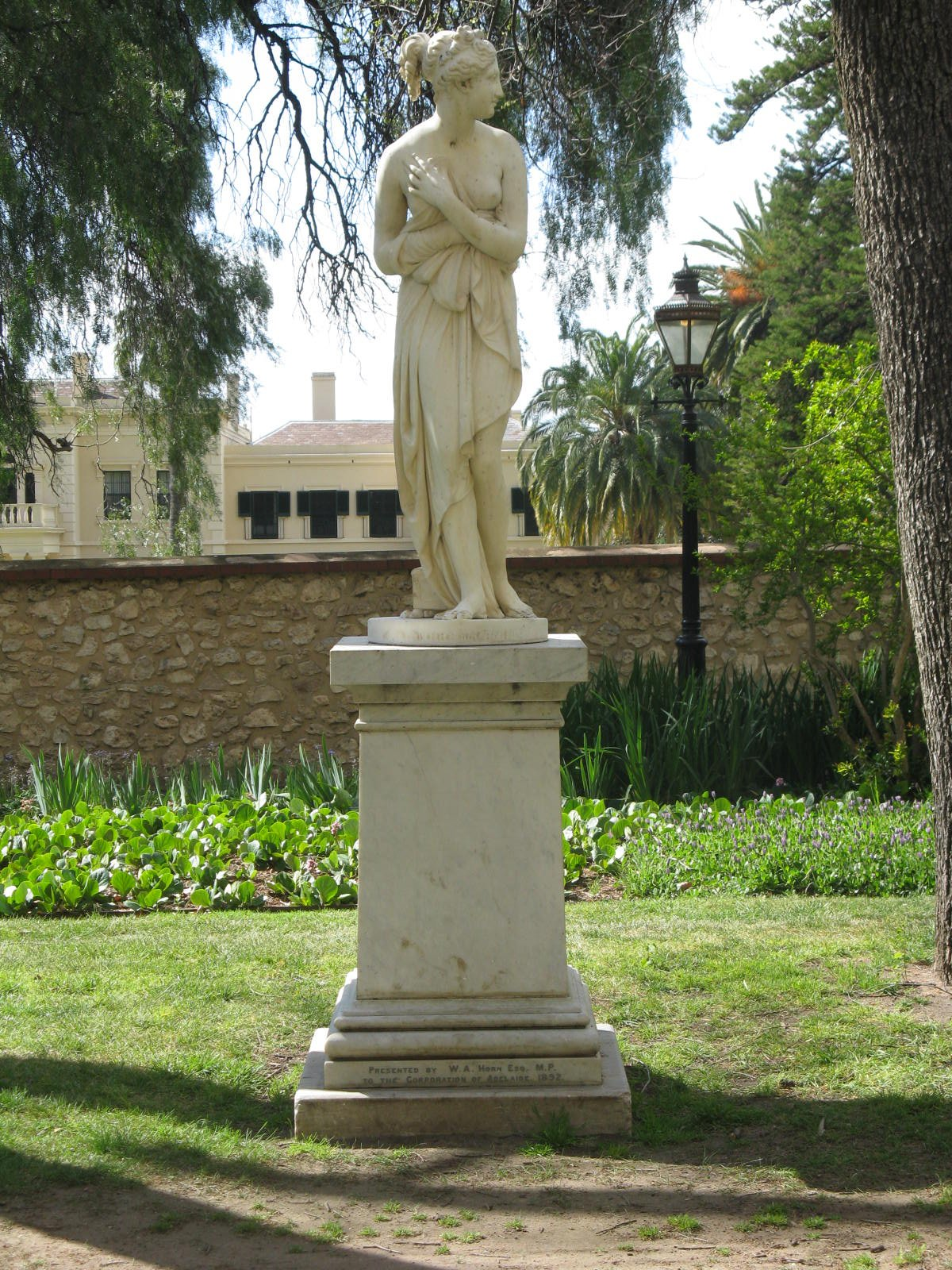
Statue

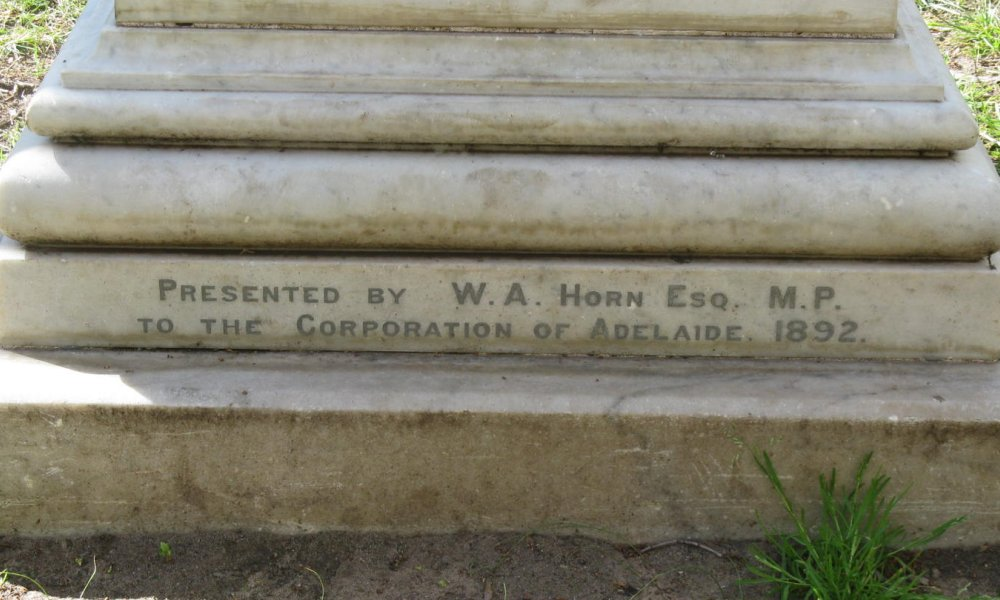
Base

=== Statue: Farnese 'Hercules' ===
Unveiled in October 1892 by Adelaide Mayor F.W. Bullock, the statue of Hercules is a replica of the Farnese Hercules, which was excavated in Naples in the sixteenth century. Crafted in the ancient Greek style, the statue has been a point of controversy and has endured vandalism over the years. It was relocated to Pennington Gardens in 1940 and underwent another move within the gardens in 2015.

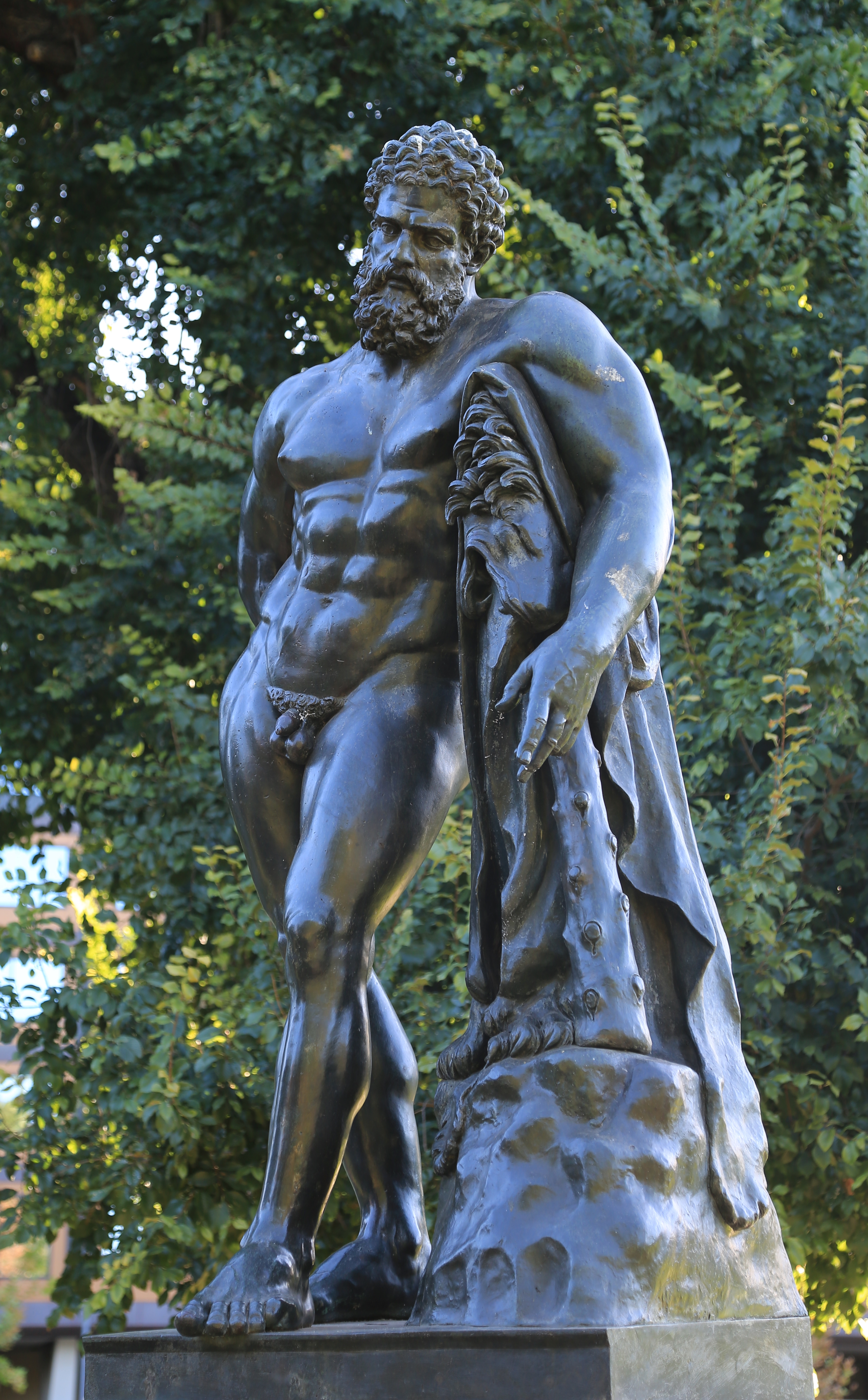
2025 image of the statue in Pennington Gardens by the Adelaide Oval, Adelaide, Australia.

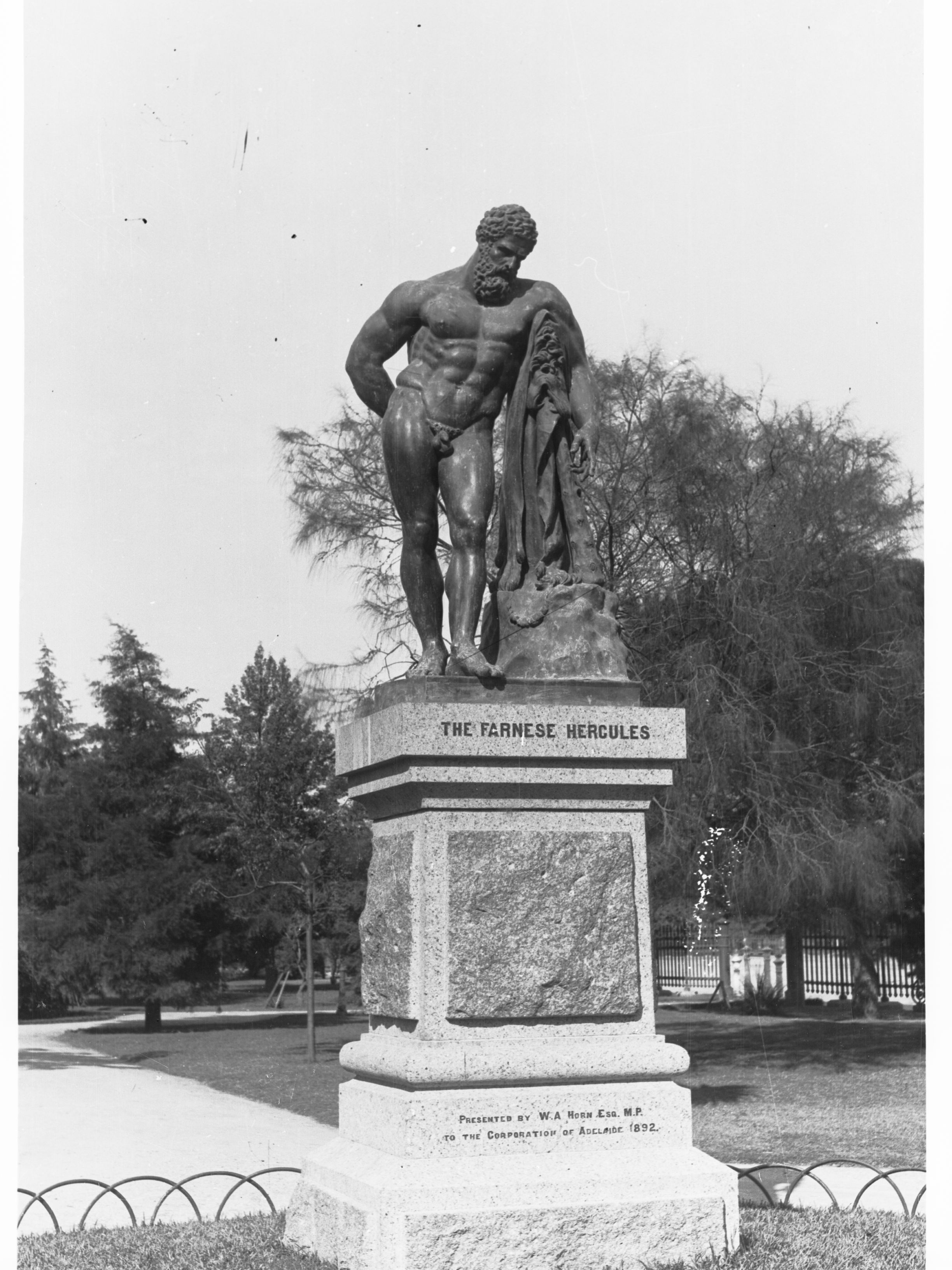
The statue at its original location, Victoria Square, Adelaide

== Author ==
Horn published two books: Bush Echoes (1901), a book of verse of the stockwhip-and-saddle-school; and Notes by a Nomad (1906).
