= Spike Up =

2007 Australian short film

- Promotional poster
- Directed by: Anthony Maras
- Written by: Anthony Maras
- Produced by: Kent Smith
- Starring: Marcus Graham; Roy Billing; Lisa Flanagan
- Cinematography: Nick Remy Matthews
- Edited by: Anthony Maras
- Music by: Duncan Campbell; Jamie Messenger; Martyn Zub
- Release date: 2007
- Country: Australia
- Language: English

Spike Up is a 2007 Australian short film, written and directed by film-maker Anthony Maras, and produced in association with the Australian Film Commission, the Adelaide Film Festival Investment Fund and the South Australian Film Corporation.

In July 2007, Spike Up was nominated for "Best Short Fiction Film" in the AFI Awards – Australia's most prestigious film awards ceremony. In September 2007, Spike Up was one of four films nominated for Best Short Film in the 2007 Australian Director's Guild Awards.

== Synopsis ==
Policeman Steve Barker hopes to reunite with Tolly Manditis, a former protégé who has risen to become a star undercover officer, only to find Manditis is a habitual drug user.

== Cast ==
| Actor | Role |
|---|---|
| Roy Billing | Steve Barker |
| Marcus Graham | Tolly Manditis |
| Lisa Flanagan | Raving Woman |
| Louisa Mignone | Amy |
| Katherine Purling | Jade |
| Peter Green | Detective Robson |
| Mark Constable | Detective Daniels |
| Madaline Otto | Jess |
| Jake Chamberlin | Chris |

== Awards and nominations ==
- 2007 Australian Film Institute Awards: Best Short Fiction Film
- 2007 Australian Directors Guild Awards: Best Short Film - Nomination
- 2007 Austin Film Festival: Best Short Film - Nomination
- 2007 ATOM Awards: Best Short Fiction Film - Nomination
- 2008 St Kilda Film Festival: Best Achievement in Post Production Sound

== Official selection ==
- 2007 Austin Film Festival
- 2007 Adelaide Film Festival
- 2008 International Film Festival Rotterdam
- 2008 Santa Barbara International Film Festival
