= Leela Varghese =

Australian film-maker and comedian

Leela Varghese (born 1992) is an Australian film-maker and comedian. She was a member of the comedy band The Coconuts with Shabana Azeez and performed at the Adelaide Fringe in 2023. Varghese co-directed the 2025 film Lesbian Space Princess with Emma Hough Hobbs and directed the short film I'm The Most Racist Person I Know.

== Biography ==
Varghese was born in Bundaberg, Australia, to a Indian father and a Lebanese mother. Alongside Shabana Azeez, Varghese was a member of the comedy band The Coconuts. In a review of their show Brown on the Outside, White on the Inside, which ran at the 2023 Adelaide Fringe, Megan Koch praised their friendship and creative partnership, and compared them to the Flight of the Conchords. Mina Asfour named their show as a "highlight" of the festival. The show featured Varghese playing acoustic and electric guitars.

Varghese co-directed the 2025 animated feature film Lesbian Space Princess with her partner Emma Hough Hobbs. The film was developed with guidance from the Film Lab: New Voices initiative run by the South Australian Film Corporation, who funded the project alongside Screen Australia and the Adelaide Film Festival. Lesbian Space Princess won the 39th Teddy Award and was the runner up for the Panorama Audience Award.

In 2025, Varghese's short film I'm The Most Racist Person I Know premiered at South By Southwest in Austin, where it won the Special Jury Award. The film, starring Shabana Azeez, also won the 2025 Iris Prize.

== Personal life ==
In 2025 Varghese mentioned dating fellow filmmaker Emma Hough Hobbs. They collaborated together on the creation of the feature film Lesbian Space Princess.
