= Hotel Mumbai =

2018 action thriller film directed by Anthony Maras

- Theatrical release poster
- Directed by: Anthony Maras
- Written by: John Collee; Anthony Maras
- Produced by: Basil Iwanyk; Gary Hamilton; Mike Gabrawy; Julie Ryan; Andrew Ogilvie; Jomon Thomas
- Starring: Dev Patel; Armie Hammer; Nazanin Boniadi; Tilda Cobham-Hervey; Anupam Kher; Jason Isaacs
- Cinematography: Nick Remy Matthews
- Edited by: Peter McNulty; Anthony Maras
- Music by: Volker Bertelmann
- Production companies: Screen Australia; Xeitgeist Entertainment Group; South Australian Film Corporation; Arclight Films; Adelaide Film Festival; Double Guess; Screenwest; Lotterywest; Hamilton Films; Thunder Road Pictures; Electric Pictures
- Distributed by: Bleecker Street (United States); Icon Film Distribution (Australia); Zee Studios; Purpose Entertainment (India)
- Release dates: 7 September 2018 (TIFF); 14 March 2019 (Australia); 22 March 2019 (United States); 29 November 2019 (India)
- Running time: 125 minutes
- Countries: Australia; India; United States
- Languages: English; Hindi
- Budget: $17.3 million (A$25 million)
- Box office: $21.1 million (A$31.5 million)

Hotel Mumbai is a 2018 action thriller film directed by Anthony Maras and co-written by Maras and John Collee. An Indian-Australian-American co-production, it is inspired by the 2009 documentary Surviving Mumbai about the 2008 Mumbai attacks at the Taj Mahal Palace Hotel in India. The film stars Dev Patel, Armie Hammer, Nazanin Boniadi, Anupam Kher, Tilda Cobham-Hervey, Jason Isaacs, Suhail Nayyar, Nagesh Bhosle, and Natasha Liu Bordizzo.

The film premiered at the Toronto International Film Festival on 7 September 2018 and had its Australian premiere at the Adelaide Film Festival on 10 October 2018. The film was released in Australia and the United States on 14 and 22 March 2019, respectively, and in India on 29 November 2019.

== Plot ==
On 26 November 2008, waiter Arjun reports for work at the Taj Mahal Palace Hotel in Mumbai, India, under head chef Hemant Oberoi. The day's guests include British-Iranian heiress Zahra Kashani and her American husband David, with their infant son Cameron and his nanny Sally, as well as ex-Spetznaz operative Vasili.

That night, terrorists from the Lashkar-e-Taiba organization, under the command of "the Bull", launch a coordinated assault against 12 locations across Mumbai, including the hotel. As the local police are not properly trained or equipped to handle the attack, they are forced to wait for reinforcements from New Delhi. In the ensuing chaos, Arjun, David, Zahra and Vasili are trapped in the hotel restaurant with several other guests while Sally remains with Cameron in their hotel room. A woman fleeing from the terrorists enters the hotel room, and Sally hides with Cameron in a closet as the terrorists shoot the woman and then leave.

Hearing of Sally's close encounter, David manages to sneak past the terrorists and successfully reach Sally and Cameron. Meanwhile, Arjun escorts the other guests to the Chambers Lounge, an exclusive club hidden within the hotel, where they hope to remain safe. David, Sally and Cameron attempt to regroup with the others, but David is captured and bound by the terrorists while Sally and Cameron are trapped inside a closet.

Meanwhile, police officer DC Vam and his partner enter the hotel in the hopes of reaching the security room so they can track the terrorists' movements. Inside, Arjun attempts to escort a mortally wounded guest to a hospital, but upon encountering the officers, she panics and flees before being killed by a terrorist. Arjun escorts the officers to the security room where they discover the terrorists about to break into the Chambers Lounge. Vam orders Arjun to stay as he goes to attack the terrorists, successfully wounding one named Imran.

Against Oberoi's advice, Zahra and Vasili, along with several other guests, decide to leave the lounge to escape, but Zahra and Vasili are caught and taken hostage along with David, while the others are killed in their attempt to escape.

While guarding the hostages, Imran contacts his family members and reveals that the terrorists left to attack Mumbai under the guise of military training. He also discovers that while the Bull had promised to pay the families of the terrorists, they have yet to receive any money from him.

Eventually, the NSG arrive, and the Bull orders the terrorists to burn the hotel down. The terrorists leave Imran to guard the hostages, and the Bull orders Imran to kill them. Imran shoots both David and Vasili, but spares Zahra against the Bull's orders when she begins reciting a Muslim prayer, allowing her to untie herself and escape.

Arjun regroups with Oberoi and evacuates the remaining guests, encountering Sally and Cameron in the process. The NSG kill the remaining terrorists, and Zahra is evacuated by an aerial work platform before reuniting with Sally and Cameron. After the hotel is secured, Arjun returns home to his wife and daughter.

A closing script reveals that all of the perpetrators of the attack were killed by the police, committed suicide or were taken in, but those responsible for the attack remained free. The hotel was repaired and parts reopened within months of the event. The final scenes show a real-life memorial to the staff and guests and footage of the grand reopening of the hotel.

== Cast ==
- Dev Patel as Arjun
- Armie Hammer as David
- Nazanin Boniadi as Zahra Kashani
- Tilda Cobham-Hervey as Sally
- Anupam Kher as Chef Hemant Oberoi
- Vitthal Nagnath Kale as DC Kanu
- Jason Isaacs as Vasili Gordetsky
- Suhail Nayyar as Abdullah
- Vipin Sharma as Dilip
- Amandeep Singh as Babar Imran
- Manoj Mehra as Houssam
- Dinesh Kumar as Rashid
- Kapil Kumar Netra as Ajmal Kasab
- Amrit Singh as Ismail Khan
- Mohammad Arafat Sarguroh as Summer King
- Angus McLaren as Eddie
- Natasha Liu Bordizzo as Bree
- Sandeep Bhojak as Doorman
- Adithi Kalkunte as Dimple
- Chantal Contouri as Mrs Karvelas

== Production ==
=== Casting ===
On 11 February 2016, it was announced that Dev Patel and Armie Hammer had been cast in the film, along with actors Nazanin Boniadi, Teresa Palmer, and Suhail Nayyar, while Nikolaj Coster-Waldau and Anupam Kher were in negotiations; Palmer and Coster-Waldau ultimately were not involved. John Collee and Anthony Maras wrote the screenplay, which Maras directed, while Basil Iwanyk produced the film through Thunder Road Pictures along with Jomon Thomas from Xeitgeist, Arclight Films' Gary Hamilton and Mike Gabrawy, Electric Pictures' Andrew Ogilvie, and Adelaide-based producer Julie Ryan.

In June, Tilda Cobham-Hervey joined the cast after Teresa Palmer pulled out early into her second pregnancy, and in August, Jason Isaacs was cast. On 7 September 2016, Natasha Liu Bordizzo joined the film to play Bree, a tourist caught in the attack.

=== Filming ===
In August 2016, principal photography on the film began in the Adelaide Film studios, run by the South Australian Film Corporation. Filming continued in India in early 2017.

== Release ==
In May 2016, the Weinstein Company acquired US and UK distribution rights to the film. However, in April 2018, it was announced that the Weinstein Company would no longer distribute the film. In August 2018, Bleecker Street and ShivHans Pictures acquired US distribution rights to the film.

The film had its world premiere at the Toronto International Film Festival on 7 September 2018. It was theatrically released in Australia on 14 March 2019, by Icon Film Distribution, and the United States on 22 March 2019. It was scheduled for a United Kingdom release in September 2019, by Sky Cinema and NowTV. Sky Cinema promoting it as a "Sky Cinema Original" in the United Kingdom.

The movie was pulled from cinemas in New Zealand due to the Christchurch mosque shootings on 15 March 2019, with showings suspended until 28 March.

Netflix was set to distribute the film across nine SAARC countries, notably India, Pakistan, and Afghanistan. However, Netflix later dropped the film, after a contractual dispute arose with Indian distributor Plus Holdings. The film was released theatrically in India on 29 November 2019 by Zee Studios and Purpose Entertainment. An official trailer of the film in Hindi was released by Zee Studios on 23 October 2019.

== Reception ==
=== Box office ===
Hotel Mumbai has grossed $9.7 million in the United States and Canada, and $11.5 million in other territories, for a worldwide total of $21.2 million.

The film opened in four theaters in the US, on 22 March, and expanded to 924 on 29 March, grossing $3.1 million in that second weekend.

=== Critical response ===
On Rotten Tomatoes, the film holds an approval rating of 76% based on 215 reviews. The website's critical consensus reads, "Its depiction of real-life horror will strike some as exploitative, but Hotel Mumbai remains a well-made dramatization of tragic events." On Metacritic, the film has a weighted average score of 62 out of 100, based on 33 critics, indicating "generally favorable" reviews. Audiences polled by PostTrak gave the film an overall positive score of 77% and a 50% "definite recommend".

Rex Reed of The New York Observer wrote: "There isn't a single wasted frame in this movie, which is both richly detailed and economically direct in its emotional impact-all the more astounding for a first feature film. Without exception, everyone is exemplary... You leave sated, with the rare feeling of having learned something about history and knowing you've been to one hell of a movie." Katie Goh of The Guardian wrote: "Patel is subdued yet excellent in Anthony Maras's white knuckle retelling of the 2008 Mumbai terror attacks. ... For all its subplots, Maras keeps a tight leash on the film's narrative strands as we watch characters move in and out of each other's stories. Hotel Mumbai is an excellent, white-knuckle thriller – and an unlikely crowd-pleaser." Malina Saval of Variety wrote: "The cinematic result is a film that is as visually breathtaking as it is emotionally electrifying, an edge-of-your-seat study on the effects of tragedy and violence on a group of strangers banding together in a fight to survive the unthinkable."

Jordan Mintzer of The Hollywood Reporter wrote: "Maras does an excellent job on such an ambitious first feature, covering every corner of the hotel and making each gunshot or explosion feel like the real thing. The level of verisimilitude is so high that when Maras cuts in actual documentary footage, it's hard to tell it apart from the fiction. As close to reality as a movie can be." Anne Cohen of Refinery29 wrote: "Anthony Maras' harrowing feature debut depicting the 2008 Mumbai attacks transcends those tired tropes to deliver one of most breathlessly stressful, emotional and insightful depictions of terrorism and its victims I've ever seen."

Jeff Sneider of Collider wrote: "Australian filmmaker Anthony Maras announces himself as a major director to watch with his feature debut Hotel Mumbai. It's a true ensemble piece, with a standout performance from Bollywood legend Anupam Kher, who registers strongest as the hotel's Chef and de facto leader of the hostages." David Ehrlich of IndieWire wrote: "Dev Patel and Armie Hammer star in a lucid, humane, and almost unwatchable harrowing drama about the 2008 Mumbai terror attacks."

=== Accolades ===
Award	Category	Subject	Result	Ref.
AACTA Awards (9th)	Best Film	Gary Hamilton	Nominated	
AACTA Awards (9th)	Best Film	Basil Iwanyk	Nominated	
AACTA Awards (9th)	Best Film	Julie Ryan	Nominated	
AACTA Awards (9th)	Best Film	Andrew Ogilvie	Nominated	
AACTA Awards (9th)	Best Film	Jomon Thomas	Nominated	
AACTA Awards (9th)	Best Screenplay, Original or Adapted	John Collee	Nominated	
AACTA Awards (9th)	Best Screenplay, Original or Adapted	Anthony Maras	Nominated	
AACTA Awards (9th)	Best Direction	Anthony Maras	Nominated	
AACTA Awards (9th)	Best Editing	Anthony Maras	Won	
AACTA Awards (9th)	Best Editing	Peter McNulty	Won	
AACTA Awards (9th)	Best Actor	Dev Patel	Nominated	
AACTA Awards (9th)	Best Actress	Nazanin Boniadi	Nominated	
AACTA Awards (9th)	Best Supporting Actress	Tilda Cobham-Hervey	Nominated	
AACTA Awards (9th)	Best Cinematography	Nick Remy Matthews	Nominated	
AACTA Awards (9th)	Best Original Music Score	Volker Bertelmann	Nominated	
AACTA Awards (9th)	Best Sound	James Currie	Nominated	
AACTA Awards (9th)	Best Sound	Nakul Kamte	Nominated	
AACTA Awards (9th)	Best Sound	Sam Petty	Nominated	
AACTA Awards (9th)	Best Sound	Peter Ristic	Nominated	
AACTA Awards (9th)	Best Sound	Pete Smith	Nominated	
AACTA Awards (9th)	Best Production Design	Steven Jones-Evans	Nominated	
AACTA Awards (9th)	Best Costume Design	Anna Borghesi	Nominated	
AACTA Awards (9th)	Best Casting	Ann Fay	Nominated	
AACTA Awards (9th)	Best Casting	Leigh Pickford	Nominated	
AACTA Awards (9th)	Best Casting	Trishaan Sarkar	Nominated	
Bandung Film Festival (32nd)	Honorable Imported Films	Hotel Mumbai	Won	
Fantasy Filmfest	Audience Award (Fresh Blood Award)	Hotel Mumbai	Won	

== See also ==
- The Attacks of 26/11
