= Adelaide Film Festival =

Film festival in Adelaide, South Australia

Coordinates: 34.94481°S 138.59932°E

- Location: Adelaide, Australia
- Founded: 2003
- Awards received: 2021 Ruby Awards "Best Festival"
- Awards: Feature Fiction Award; Feature Documentary Award; Don Dunstan Award; The Jim Bettison and Helen James Award; Indigenous Feature Documentary Initiative; INSITE Award; AFTRS International VR Award
- Directors: Mat Kesting (2019–); Amanda Duthie (2012–2018); Katrina Sedgwick (2002–2011)
- Hosted by: Sophie Hyde (patron)
- Festival date: 15 – 26 October 2025
- Website: adelaidefilmfestival.org

The Adelaide Film Festival (AFF, formerly ADLFF) is a film festival usually held for two weeks in mid-October in cinemas in Adelaide, South Australia. Originally presented biennially in March from 2003, since 2013 AFF has been held in October. Subject to funding, the festival has staged full or briefer events in alternating years; some form of event has taken place every year since 2015. From 2022 it takes place annually. It has a strong focus on local South Australian and Australian produced content, with the Adelaide Film Festival Investment Fund (AFFIF) established to fund investment in Australian films.

Established in 2003 as Adelaide International Film Festival, it dropped "International" from its title after the inaugural edition, as it dropped its FIAPF membership the following year. It was, however, the first film festival in Australia to introduce an international competition, as well as being the first to fund film production directly.

The festival hosts a number of awards, including the Don Dunstan Awards (for lifetime contribution); Best Feature Fiction; Best Feature Documentary; Bettison & James Award; and others. In 2017 the International Virtual Reality Award was launched by AFF in partnership with the Australian Film, Television and Radio School (AFTRS), known as the AFTRS ADL Film Fest International VR Award.

The 2025 festival runs from 15–26 October.

== History ==
=== Overview ===
An independently financed Adelaide International Film Festival (AIFF) had been held from 1959 to 1980. The idea of a new film festival to stimulate the local film industry and celebrate the 30th anniversary of the South Australian Film Corporation was raised by Premier Mike Rann in 2002, and a director and board were appointed. The Adelaide Film Festival Investment Fund was created to fund the Film Festival and other events.

The inaugural Adelaide (International) Film Festival was held from 28 February to 3 March 2003. It ran a programme of screenings, special events and forums in a number of cinemas across Adelaide. It was the first film festival in Australia to introduce an international competition, and also the first to create an investment fund specifically for film production.

After its first edition, the festival ceased to use "International" in its title, denoting a withdrawal from FIAPF membership. It was known as the BigPond Adelaide Film Festival, or BAFF, for a period until 2011, as its main sponsor had been BigPond.

Since the first event in 2003, the Festival has been held (originally in odd-numbered years) in 2005, 2007, 2009, 2011, 2013, 2015, 2016 (a one-off "Rogue" event), 2017, 2018, and a "pop-up" weekend festival in March 2019.

Audiences have grown year on year, with an audience of more than 64,000 people in 2018, and estimated to have had an impact of A$26.5 million on the state's economy. The 2022 festival's audience and box office broke all previous records.

As of July 2022 the festival had been held 11 times since, usually biennially but as an annual event from 2015 to 2018 (with occasional mini-events in intervening years). In 2022 it was announced that the full festival would be presented each year, instead of biennially, after the Malinauskas government pledged A$500,000 annually for the following four years.

In May 2024, Adelaide Film Festival launched its "Adelaide Film Festival Goes to Cannes" program. It partnered with Cannes Film Festival's film market, the Marché du Film, to showcase five local projects in an official presentation, as well as taking a group of ten South Australian filmmakers to participate in a program of activities there. The film projects are Kangaroo Island, Lesbian Space Princess, Mockbuster, Iron Winter, and With or Without You. Ten filmmakers were selected for the group travelling to Cannes: Sandy Cameron, Ben Golotta, Timothy David, Kelly Schilling, Leela Varghese, Travis Akbar, Lisa Scott, Joshua Trevorrow, Matt Vesely, and Nara Wilson.

=== Locations ===
From 2017 to 2020, festival events took place mainly at the GU Filmhouse in Hindley Street (defunct as of 1 October 2020), with some sessions at the smaller Mercury Cinema in Morphett Street.

In 2020, most screenings were hosted by Palace Nova at their Eastend and Prospect locations, with some showings at Mitcham Wallis Cinemas at Mitcham Square Shopping Centre, Odeon Star in Semaphore, Tandanya, the Warriparinga Wetlands, and at Alberton Oval. In 2022, for the first time, screenings also took place at the Capri Theatre in Goodwood, Her Majesty's Theatre, and Event Cinemas Marion, in addition to the two Palace Nova locations, Wallis Mitcham, and Odeon Semaphore. In 2024, screenings take place at the recently refurbished Piccadilly Cinema in North Adelaide, as well as the Palace Nova Eastend, Semaphore Odeon, and Mercury Cinema.

=== Festival directors ===
Katrina Sedgwick was the festival's founding director in 2002. She had previously co-founded the 1995 Sydney Fringe Festival, was the Special Events Producer (1998, 2000) for the Adelaide Festival of Arts, and the artistic director for the 2002 Adelaide Fringe. In 2007, Sedgwick introduced an international jury prize to the festival. At the time of her stepping down from the role of Festival director in 2013, Sedgwick said that the festival was the first in Australia to introduce an international competition, and a production fund, and that ticket sales had grown by 20 per cent each year.

2013 was Amanda Duthie's first year as festival director, after spending eight years at the Australian Broadcasting Corporation and eight years at the Special Broadcasting Service during the 1990s.

After running the festival's programming from 2015 to 2018, Mat Kesting was appointed as the new CEO and creative director in 2019. Kesting is originally from Adelaide, and went to Melbourne to study media and cinema studies. He had become more interested in film while at university, and from 1999 to 2009 ran a filmmaking competition and short-film festival called 15/15 Film Festival, which toured around Australia after an opening event in Melbourne that sold out a large venue. He was program manager at the Brisbane International Film Festival from 2006 until 2008; programmed six editions of the "On Screen" strand of OzAsia Festival in Adelaide; and was exhibition manager at the Mercury Cinema. In 2019 he was named at Cannes as one of Screen International's Future Leaders. As of 2024 he remains the director of Adelaide Film Festival.

== Patrons and board ==
In 2024 filmmaker Sophie Hyde took on the role of patron, after well-known film critics Margaret Pomeranz and David Stratton retired from their ten years of service to the festival.

The board of the Adelaide Film Festival as of 2024 consists of:

- Chair Anton Andreacchio, producer and entrepreneur, board member of the South Australian Film Corporation and Entrepreneurship Advisory Board
- Beck Cole, prominent Aboriginal screenwriter and director of drama and documentaries
- Hugo Weaving, actor
- Joshua Fanning, company director and entrepreneur; founder of CityMag, group creative director for KWP!
- Marianna Panopoulos, a certified practising accountant and a graduate of the Australian Institute of Company Directors
- Rick Davies, engineer, lawyer and filmmaker
- Jessica Gallagher, University of Adelaide's inaugural Deputy Vice-Chancellor (External Engagement)
- Sheila Jayadev, producer (Stateless), co-founder of Emerald Productions

== Recognition ==
In 2007, the AFF featured in Variety Magazine's Top 50 unmissable film festivals around the world, saying: "Of the planet’s 1,000-plus film fests, only a select few pack industry impact. A few dozen more, by virtue of vision, originality, striking setting, audience zest and/or their ability to mine a unique niche, also rank as must-attends".

The Adelaide Film Festival's 2020 event was awarded "Best Festival" at the 2021 South Australian Ruby Awards, an annual ceremony which recognises outstanding achievement in South Australia’s arts and culture sector.

== Jury awards ==
=== Don Dunstan Award ===
The Don Dunstan Award was established in honour of Don Dunstan, Premier of South Australia through most of the 1970s, and is presented in recognition of an outstanding contribution to the Australian film industry by an individual.

Past recipients have included:

- 2003 - David Gulpilil, actor
- 2005 - Dennis O'Rourke, cinematographer and documentary filmmaker
- 2007 – Rolf de Heer, director
- 2009 – Jan Chapman, producer
- 2011 – Judy Davis, actor
- 2013 – Scott Hicks, director
- 2015 – Andrew Bovell, screenwriter and playwright
- 2017 – Margaret Pomeranz & David Stratton, film critics
- 2018 – Freda Glynn, pioneering Indigenous filmmaker, and her family members involved in the film industry: offspring Erica Glynn and Warwick Thornton, and grandchildren Tanith Glynn-Maloney and Dylan River
- 2020 – Bruna Papandrea, producer
- 2022 – David Jowsey, producer, of Bunya Productions
- 2023 – Sally Riley, producer
- 2024 – Don McAlpine, cinematographer
- 2025 – Robert Connolly

=== Feature Fiction Award ===
ADL Film Fest was the first Australian film festival to create a juried prize for best feature film.

Winners have included:

- 2006 Still Life (Jia Zhangke, China)
- 2009 Treeless Mountain (So Yong Kim USA/South Korea)
- 2011 Incendies (Denis Villeneuve, Canada/France)
- 2013 Jîn (Reha Erdem, Turkey)
- 2015 Neon Bull (Gabriel Mascaro, Brazil)
- 2017 I Am Not a Witch (Rungano Nyoni, France/United Kingdom)
- 2019 The Seen and Unseen (Kamila Andini, Indonesia/Netherlands/Australia)
- 2020 Beginning (Déa Kulumbegashvili, Georgia)
- 2022 Autobiography (Makbul Mubarak, Indonesia)
- 2023 Empty Nets (Behrooz Karamizade, Iran)
- 2024 In the Belly of a Tiger (Jatla Siddartha)
- 2025: Vanilla (Mayra Hermosillo); Special Mention to Reedland (Sven Bresser)
- 2026: The Smell of Apple (John Trengove); Special Mention to Fruit Gathering (Aung Phyoe)

=== Feature Documentary Award ===
The Feature Documentary Award, also known as the Flinders University International Documentary Award, was first awarded in 2013, with the inaugural prize going to Blush of Fruit (Australia, Vietnam), directed by Jakeb Anhvu. Since then it has been won by:

- 2015 Speed Sisters (Amber Fares)
- 2017 Taste of Cement (Ziad Kalthoum)
- 2018 Island of the Hungry Ghosts (Gabrielle Brady)
- 2020 Firestarter – The Story of Bangarra (Nel Minchin and Wayne Blair; about the Bangarra Dance Theatre)
- 2022 The Hamlet Syndrome (set shortly before Russia's invasion of Ukraine)
- 2023 Hollywoodgate (Ibrahim Nash'at, Egypt)
- 2024 Simon and Marianne (Pier-Luc Latulippe and Martin Fournier)
- 2025: She (Parsifal Reparato); Special Mention to Sanatorium (Gar O'Rourke)
- 2026: The Balkan Cowboy (Dragana Jurišić); Special Mention to Tehran, Under the Skin (Afsaneh Salari)

=== Bettison & James Award ===
The Bettison & James Award, formerly Jim Bettison and Helen James Award, presented in collaboration with the Jim Bettison and Helen James Foundation, was established to recognise Australians who "have contributed exemplary and inspiring lifelong body of work of high achievement and benefit; and that the completion, extension, recording and/or dissemination of such work would have benefits for both the individual concerned and for the wider Australian community". The annual award of A$50,000 is made to an individual who has contributed significantly in whatever their area of expertise is, be it arts, humanities, social justice, science, the environment or something else. The foundation was established by the estates of Jim Bettison and his partner Helen James. Bettison created the Developed Image Photographic Gallery, co-founded communications company Codan and served as Deputy Chancellor of the University of Adelaide, his alma mater (an honorary position). Helen was an exhibiting studio artist, who served on a number of arts committees and was one of the founding members of the National Library of Australia’s Foundation Board.

- 2015: Greg Mackie OAM, founder of the Adelaide Festival of Ideas
- 2016: Meryl Tankard AO, dancer, choreographer and director; and

Tim Jarvis, adventurer and environmental scientist

- 2017: Robert McFarlane, social documentary and arts photographer
- 2018: Jackie Huggins AM FAHA, author, historian and Indigenous rights advocate, for researching the social impacts of Aboriginal soldiers going to fight in both World Wars.
- 2019: John Long, paleontologist, academic, and author of popular science non-fiction and fiction.
- 2020: David Vaux, scientist and expert on cell death, 2019 co-recipient of the Florey Medal for Lifetime Achievement
- 2021: Bob Brown, environmentalist, human rights campaigner and former political leader of the Australian Greens party.
- 2022: Pat Rix, artistic director
- 2023: Uncle Major ‘Moogy’ Sumner AM, Ngarrindjeri cultural ambassador and performer
- 2024: Angela Valamanesh, independent visual artist
- 2025: Richard Leplastrier AO, Sydney architect

=== Change Award ===
The Change Award was established in 2020. Worth A$5,000 and sponsored by Zambrero, it is awarded "for positive social or environmental impact and cinema expressing new directions for humanity", initially selected by audience vote, and in later years by a jury.

- 2020: Firestarter – The Story of Bangarra (Nel Minchin and Wayne Blair; about the Bangarra Dance Theatre)
- 2022: Luku Ngarra, directed by Sinem Saban and produced by Djiniyini Gondarra OAM and Saban, about the history and culture of Arnhem Land
- 2023: Black Cockatoo Crisis
- 2024: Union (Stephen Maing and Brett Story)
- 2025: Trade Secret (Abraham Joffe)

=== Short Film Award ===
In 2024, the jury short film prize was sponsored by Flinders University.

- 2024: Finding Jia (Alice Yang)

In 2025, the award was sponsored by Humanee.

- 2025: The Eating of an Orange (May Kindred-Boothby, UK); Special Mention to God is Shy (Jocelyn Charles, France) (Fr: Dieu est timide)

== Audience Awards ==
=== Audience Award for Feature Fiction ===
- 2022: Ribspreader (Dick Dale)
- 2023: Poor Things (Yorgos Lanthimos)
- 2024: Lesbian Space Princess (Emma Hough Hobbs & Leela Varghese)
- 2025: No Other Choice (Park Chan-wook)

=== Feature Documentary Audience Award ===
- 2022: The Last Daughter (Nathaniel Schmidt and Brenda Matthews)
- 2023: Bromley: Light After Dark (Sean McDonald)
- 2024: Songs Inside (Shalom Almond)
- 2025: Mockbuster (Anthony Frith)

=== Short Film Audience Award ===
Established in 2022 as the Flinders University Short Film Prize, this award is determined by audience vote.

- 2022: Are You Really the Universe, directed by Tamara Hardman and starring Tilda Cobham-Hervey
- 2023: Blame the Rabbit (Elena Carapetis) and The Unrequited Life of Farrah Bruce (Daisy Anderson)
- 2024: Finding Jia (Alice Yang)
- 2025: Alpha Test (Stephen Packer)

== Former awards ==
=== INSITE Award ===
The Adelaide Film Festival teamed up with the Australian Writers' Guild to present the INSITE Award at the 2013 Festival. The Award celebrates and acknowledges outstanding work produced by AWG screenwriters and provides an important development opportunity for both writers and the industry. The winner gets to meet industry directors and producers, with a view to moving the project onto the screen.

It has not been awarded since 2017 and is not mentioned on the 2020 list of awards. Past winners have included:

- 2003 Cut Snake, by Blake Ayshford, was filmed by director Tony Ayres.
- 2005 Moving South, by Cath Moore.
- 2007 Salt, by Priscilla Cameron and Heather Phillips, was directed by Michael Angus in 2009. The film played at the Adelaide Film Festival that same year.
- 2009 Writing Rain, written by Ben Chessell.
- 2011 The Unlikeliest Hero, by Barbara Connell, was planned to be filmed by New Zealand director James Cunningham in an official Australia/New Zealand co-production, with completion of the film timed to coincide with the 100-year commemorations of Anzac Day. (However, as of September 2020 it was last reported as being pitched as an animated film at the Annecy International Animation Film Festival in 2015.)
- 2013 Tigress, written by Jane Hampson.
- 2015 Martingale, written by Harry Aletras.
- 2017 Petrova, written by Bec Peniston-Bird.

=== AFTRS International VR Award ===
In 2017, ADL Film Fest introduced the AFTRS ADL Film Fest International VR Award, the first competition of its kind in Australia, in collaboration with the Australian Film, Television and Radio School (AFTRS). Nothing Happens, by Michelle and Uri Kranot, won the inaugural award, while The Other Dakar by Selly Raby, based on Senegalese mythology, received a Special Mention.

In 2018, The Unknown Patient, by Australian director Michael Beets won the award.

=== Indigenous Feature Documentary Initiative ===
In partnership with Screen Australia, KOJO and the National Film and Sound Archive, this initiative, the first of its kind, was created in 2015 to support an "innovative, observational and/or social justice documentary" with a funding package of up to A$738,000. The award provided funding for an established Indigenous film-maker to make a feature-length documentary, providing funding for the director and a producer.

Eualeyai/Kamillaroi writer and academic Larissa Behrendt, along with Michaela Perske as writer and producer, were awarded the funding in 2016 to work on their feature documentary project, After the Apology.

On 9 October 2017, AFF held the world première of the resulting film, and it was sold out at the Winda Film Festival in Sydney in November of that year. The film focuses on a group of grandmothers (Grandmothers Against Removals) taking on the system over the increase in Indigenous child removal in the years following Kevin Rudd's Apology to Australia's Indigenous peoples, in which he offered an apology on behalf of the Australian Government to the Stolen Generations resulting from historic child removal policies in Australia. It won Best Direction of a Documentary Feature Film from the Australian Directors Guild in 2018, and was nominated in three categories in the 2018 AACTA Awards: Best Direction in Nonfiction Television (Larissa Behrendt); Best Documentary or Factual Program (Michaela Perske); and Best Original Music Score in A Documentary (Caitlin Yeo).

== Juries ==
Jury members for the International Feature Film Prize have included Afghani actor Leena Alam and Portuguese filmmaker João Pedro Rodrigues (2017); Palestinian filmmaker Annemarie Jacir and Adelaide filmmaker Sophie Hyde (2015); actor/filmmaker Wayne Blair and writer Lawrence Weschler ( 2013); Hossein Valamanesh (2011); J. M. Coetzee (2007 & 2009), Naomi Kawase and David Stratton (2009); Margaret Pomeranz and Ana Kokkinos (2007).

Jury members for the Flinders University Documentary Prize have included Eva Orner (2017); Beck Cole (2015) and Michael Loebenstein (2015).

Amanda Duthie, AFF artistic director and virtual reality champion, sat on the jury for the inaugural AFTRS International VR Award in 2017.

- 2020: Andrew Bovell, Khoa Do, Zak Hepburn, Rebecca Summerton (of Closer Productions), and Natasha Wanganeen
- 2022: Ali Gumillya Baker, Luke Buckmaster, Jim Kolmar, Lisa Scott, and Tusi Tamasese
- 2023: Kitty Green, Alexander Matius, Sally Riley, David Rooney, and Goran Stolevski
- 2024: Claudia Rodríguez Valencia, Leena Khobragade, Matthew Bate, Stephen A Russell, and Penny Smallacombe of Blackfella Films.
- 2025: John Sheedy, Jub Clerc, Marion Pilowsky, Murray Bartlett, and Pavel Cortés

== AFF Youth ==
Adelaide Film Festival Youth (or AFF Youth) is a section of the AFF dedicated to young filmmakers. It hosts the Statewide Schools Filmmakers Competition, which is a competition open to South Australian students to submit their short films into.

=== Awards ===
==== Best Primary School Film ====
- 2023 - Selma directed by Harrison J Thomas and The Tree Of Wellness directed by Buddhima Polwatte, Lily Gration, Steven Wang and Ava King
- 2024 - The Forgotten Suitcase directed by Neo Dama

==== Best Middle School Film ====
- 2023 - Unmasked directed by Aurora Chan
- 2024 - Coexistence directed by Gabriel Zurbrugg

==== Best High School Film ====
- 2023 - GEIGER directed by Eddie Gerard, Hamish Headland, Sam Gniel
- 2024 - Donatello Detective directed by Matthew Page, Ethan Alaia, Josh Hynes

==== People's Choice Award ====
- 2023 - Golden Boy – The Untold Story of the Oscars directed by Matthew Page & Joshua Hynes

==== Best Director ====
- 2024 - Percy McGuire, Ashleigh Penny (Percy)

== Film Lab: New Voices ==
In 2021, the Film Lab: New Voices initiative was launched by the South Australian Film Corporation and the AFF, in collaboration with Mercury CX. This program supports emerging filmmakers, with three teams selected for mentoring over an 11-month development period and one team then selected for funding to complete a low-budget feature film which is premiered at the next AFF.

The low budget sci-fi thriller Monolith was announced as being the first project funded by the initiative. The winning team, comprising director Matt Vesely, producer Bettina Hamilton and writer Lucy Campbell, were given six months to develop, shoot and edit their film, which premiered at the 2022 Festival to much acclaim. Monolith, which features Australian actress Lily Sullivan, has since gone to screen at pop culture festival SXSW and will receive a general cinema release in mid-2023.

The second project to be funded by the initiative was animated comedy Lesbian Space Princess, by writers and directors Emma Hough Hobbs and Leela Varghese and producer Tom Phillips. The film premiered at the 2024 Adelaide Film Festival.

The third film to be funded is a horror film, initially titled The Debt, led by First Nations creatives. The team comprises co-writers Pearl Berry and Piri Eddy, director Johanis Lyons-Reid, and producer Lilla Berry. The Debt was in production in South Australia as of January 2026. Renamed Lucrum, the film premiered at AFF on 23 October 2026.

== Past events ==
=== 2013: 10–20 October ===
The 6th Adelaide Film Festival took place from 10 to 20 October 2013. This was Amanda Duthie's first year as Festival Director (after eight years at the Australian Broadcasting Corporation and eight years at the Special Broadcasting Service during the 1990s), having taken over from Katrina Sedgwick. Margaret Pomeranz and David Stratton served as the festival's patrons.

Scott Hicks received the 2013 Don Dunstan Award for his contribution to the Australian film industry.

The poster in 2013 depicted Screen Worship, which celebrates work for all screens—cinema, television, phone and computer.

=== 2015: 15–25 October ===
The 7th Adelaide Film Festival was held from 15 to 25 October 2015. Amanda Duthie was again the Festival Director. On the opening night of the festival, director and screenwriter Andrew Bovell received the 2015 Don Dunstan Award for his contribution to the Australian film industry.

The festival opened with Scott Hicks's documentary film Highly Strung, and closed with Paolo Sorrentino's drama film Youth.

More than 180 feature films were screened at the festival, 40 of which were Australian films, 24 South Australian films and total of 51 countries were represented at the Festival.

As part of the 2015 Adelaide Film Festival, a public art installation was presented, incorporating a Laneway Cinema in Cinema Place, showing moving image artworks, and a 'Reactive Wall', where six artists created 2D visual artworks live in response to content within the festival.

=== 2016: 27–30 October ===
Having previously been held biennially, the highlight of "AFF Goes Rogue" in October 2016 was a 4-day "mini-festival" in the in-between year. The first of the works commissioned by the Adelaide Film Festival Fund in that month was the Australian premiere season of Lynette Wallworth's Collisions (5–30 October). Then there was a free talk by Greg Mackie at the Adelaide Festival of Ideas on 23 October, and the events culminated in a 4-day mini-festival (27–30 October) featuring world premiere screenings of two films – Australia's first Muslim rom-com Ali's Wedding, based on the life of actor, writer and comedian Osamah Sami, and a special "work in progress" screening of David Stratton's Stories of Australian Cinema, directed by Sally Aitken (later released as David Stratton: A Cinematic Life). Other films shown were Gimme Danger, a documentary film about the Stooges, and a retrospective screening of Lucky Miles (2007).

=== 2017: 5–15 October ===
At the 2017 festival, the theme "Vive le Punk" celebrated the punk movement's 40th anniversary. It featured A Fantastic Woman, Call Me By Your Name, a set by Adelaide punk band Exploding White Mice and Ai Weiwei's documentary about migration, Human Flow.

=== 2018: 10–21 October ===
In April 2017, the Premier Jay Weatherill announced that a full festival, including new funding of A$1m for the ADL Film Fest Fund, would run again in October 2018.

Hotel Mumbai, Can You Ever Forgive Me?, rock documentary Bad Reputation (about Joan Jett) and The Nightingale (directed by The Babadook director Jennifer Kent) were some of the films shown.

=== 2019: 5–7 April "pop-up" ===
In April 2019, a weekend "pop-up" event was held, to showcase Wayne Blair's romcom, Top End Wedding, and Adelaide filmmaker Sophie Hyde's Australian/Irish co-production Animals.

=== 2020: 14−30 October ===
In 2020 the Adelaide Film Festival was scheduled to run from 14 to 25 October, one of the few events of its type during the worldwide COVID-19 pandemic, but due to the success of the festival, an extended run of selected films was scheduled as part of the Best of the Fest programme, re-showing ten of the programmed films from 26 to 30 October.

To open the festival, the locally filmed sci-fi thriller 2067 played in seven cinemas simultaneously, with extra screenings added due to demand. One of the headlining films was I Am Woman, starring Adelaide actor Tilda Cobham-Hervey, who returned from Los Angeles in September. Other films included the documentary The Painter and the Thief, and High Ground, and the films include 22 world premieres, 27 Australian premieres and a total of 54 feature films from many countries.

The competition jury comprised playwright and screenwriter Andrew Bovell, actor Natasha Wanganeen, filmmaker Khoa Do, producer Rebecca Summerton of Closer Productions, and film critic Zak Hepburn.

The earliest screening at the festival took place on 22 August, with several early showings of I Am Woman; the final event, a documentary about Port Adelaide Football Club called This is Port Adelaide, premiered at Odeon Star Semaphore from 5–7 February 2021.

=== 2022: 19−30 October ===
The 2022 edition of the festival was held from 19 to 30 October. Films selected for screening included Todd Field's Tár (starring Cate Blanchett, who appeared in a Q&A session after its first showing); My Policeman, with Harry Styles; South Australian horror thriller Carnifex, with Alexandra Park; Ruben Östlund's Triangle of Sadness; Brenda Matthews and Nathaniel Schmidt's documentary The Last Daughter; and Aftersun, a debut from Scottish director Charlotte Wells. Danny and Michael Philippou's debut Talk to Me, an Australian supernatural horror film, closed the festival. The Survival of Kindness by Rolf de Heer had red-carpet parties in the city. The South Australian film Monolith had its world premiere at the festival on 27 October 2022. It was announced after the opening weekend that several films would get a second outing in the week following the festival, including The Last Daughter, Monolith, Talk to Me, Tár, and Triangle of Sadness.

=== 2023: 18–29 October ===
The 2023 festival ran from 18 to 29 October at five cinemas across Adelaide, with Palace Nova Eastend the main venue. Gala events screened The Royal Hotel, directed and co-written by Kitty Green and filmed in South Australia; true crime documentary Speedway, directed by Luke Rynderman and Adam Kamien; and the closing gala featured director Scott Hicks' symphonic concert documentary My Name's Ben Folds - I Play Piano, about musician Ben Folds.

=== 2024: 23 October–3 November ===
In 2024, SA filmmaker Sophie Hyde took over from former patrons Margaret Pomeranz and David Stratton, who had occupied the role for around ten years. The 2024 jury comprised the CEO of Preciosa Media, Claudia Rodríguez Valencia; director Leena Khobragade; Closer Productions founder and co-director Matthew Bate; film journalist and critic Stephen A Russell; and Penny Smallacombe, who is head of scripted at Blackfella Films.

The 2024 event featured over 110 films from 46 countries, with 15 world premieres. The opening night gala film was The Correspondent, based on journalist Peter Greste's memoir The First Casualty, directed by Kriv Stenders and starring Richard Roxburgh, both of whom were in attendance. Kangaroo Island, a drama film directed by South Australian ex-pat Tim Piper (aka Timothy David) and set on Kangaroo Island, premiered on the closing night. Other films included The Order; The Room Next Door; Maria; The Brutalist; Pavements; Make It Look Real; and Film Lab/New Voices animated comedy Lesbian Space Princess.

The films screened at the Palace Nova Eastend, Piccadilly Cinema in North Adelaide, Capri Theatre in Goodwood, Mercury Cinema, and Odeon Star Semaphore. Events were also held in the Samstag Museum of Art. The event set a new box office and attendance record.

=== 2025: 15 October–26 October ===
2025 edition was held from 15 October to 26 October. In this edition 27 World Premieres and 37 Australian premieres were presented in the total 123 films from 27 countries. In the opening Night Gala Sophie Hyde's Jimpa was screened. It closed with the presentation of Wolfram by Warwick Thornton.
