= Amanda Duthie =

Australian arts administrator

- Born: Scotland
- Occupations: Arts administrator, festival director
- Writing career
- Language: English
- Years active: 1991–present

Amanda Duthie is an Australian arts administrator. She was previously the CEO of the Adelaide Film Festival and a member of the board of the Adelaide Festival. She is the founding CEO of Hybrid World Adelaide.

== Early life ==
Amanda Duthie was born in Scotland.

== Career ==
Duthie began her career at SBS in 1991 working across a range of productions, focusing on programming and commissioning. The Movie Show with Margaret and David introduced her to a range of movies beyond Hollywood. Working on programs such as Eat Carpet introduced her to the world of experimental filmmaking and the first works of major filmmakers.

She remained at SBS until 1999, when she moved to become associate producer of the PBS-BBC-ABC co-production Australia: Beyond the Fatal Shore written and presented by Australian historian, art critic and writer Robert Hughes.

In 2000 Duthie was an independent producer, delivering screen based work for the launch of the National Museum of Australia.

She then joined the New South Wales Film and Television Office (later Screen NSW) as senior project manager. In December 2003, Duthie joined ABC Television, as Commissioning Editor, Arts & Entertainment and was then appointed Head, Content Arts & Entertainment, serving from October 2008 to January 2012.

Over nine years at the ABC, Duthie delivered an array of content across all ABC platforms, including Hetti Perkins Art & Soul, Kitchen Cabinet with Annabel Crabb, The New Inventors, Betty Churcher's Hidden Treasures, At The Movies with Margaret and David, Spicks & Specks, The Gruen Transfer and Gruen Planet, Judith Lucy's Spiritual Journey, Adam Hills in Gordon Street Tonight, Shaun Micallef's Mad as Hell and various Chaser projects. Her arts programming slate included Artscape, At the Movies, First Tuesday Book Club, an ongoing series of ABC Live concerts, and The Bazura Project.

In June 2009, one of "her" shows, The Chaser's War on Everything, broadcast the infamous "Make a Realistic Wish Foundation" skit, which led to complaints and criticism. As a result, Duthie had her responsibility for comedy removed, but remained the Head of Arts & Entertainment. The Chaser team expressed disappointment at the demotion, saying Duthie had been treated harshly.

She remained at the ABC for nine years, leaving in December 2011 to join the Adelaide Film Festival as CEO and creative director.

The inaugural Adelaide Film Festival director had been Katrina Sedgwick, who held the position from 2002 to 2012. She resigned to pursue other opportunities and ended up as ABC television's Head of Arts, Amanda Duthie's previous position (the two women had effectively swapped jobs). In 2013 Duthie delivered her first Adelaide Film Festival, and the 2013 Adelaide Festival of Ideas. Over her six years in the role Duthie delivered eight major events, including five Adelaide Film Festivals, the inaugural Hybrid World Adelaide in 2017 and 2018, and the 2013 Festival of Ideas.

In September 2018 it was announced Duthie would commence in the role of Head of Production, Development, Attraction and Studios at the South Australian Film Corporation, at the close of the 2018 Adelaide Film Festival.

== Publications ==
In September 2018 Wakefield Press published Kin: An Extraordinary Australian Filmmaking Family, a book about Freda Glynn and her family, edited by Duthie.

== Boards and committees ==
As of 2015, Duthie was a member of the boards of Adelaide Festival, South Australian Museum, Ukaria Cultural Centre, was a committee member of the Jim Bettison & Helen James Award, and sits on the advisory board for ARC Centre of Excellence for the History of Emotions at the University of Western Australia.

Other positions she has held include:

- Board Director, Festivals Adelaide (2011-2016), a peak group of the ten major South Australian events working towards a collective cultural vision and strategy for the state
- Advisory Board, Premier's Council for Women (2015-2016). working to establish better representation of women in business in South Australia; committee member for the inaugural 50/50 networking event
- Board Director, Adelaide Festival of Arts (2012-2016)
- Inaugural Board Member, Committee for Adelaide (2013-2015), established by Ian Smith (Bespoke Approach); the committee's goal is to drive capital investment and community growth
