= 2005 Adelaide Film Festival =

- Opening film: Look Both Ways
- Closing film: Ten Canoes
- Location: Adelaide, Australia
- Founded: 2002
- Awards: Don Dunstan Award (Dennis O'Rourke)
- Directors: Katrina Sedgwick
- Festival date: 18 February – 3 March 2005
- Website: adelaidefilmfestival.org

The 2nd Adelaide Film Festival took place in Adelaide, Australia, from 18 February to 3 March 2005. Katrina Sedgwick was again Festival Director.

Dennis O'Rourke received the 2005 Don Dunstan Award for his contribution to the Australian film industry.

The poster this year depicts two children shining a light on the festival theme, Image is Everything.

The festival opened with Look Both Ways directed by Sarah Watt, the first feature to be funded through the Adelaide Film Festival Investment Fund, and closed with Ten Canoes directed by Rolf de Heer.

== Development ==
Adelaide was the first Australian festival to "pursue a production agenda. The event’s integration with local and regional industries brought it into line with the model adopted by several major Asian festivals such as Hong Kong and Pusan."

The second Adelaide Film Festival began an association with the highly successful Italian children's festival, the Giffoni Film Festival, which showcases new films to panels of young film critics. The Giffoni Film Festival was set up in 1971, in Salerno, by Claudio Gubitosi, who was then 18. It has been so successful it has been exported to other parts of Europe and North America, including Los Angeles, where actor Jon Voight is involved. The 2005 Adelaide Film Festival attracted the Giffoni to Adelaide and the director "hopes it will be a permanent association".

In the second of two programmed lectures, special guest film scholar David Bordwell described the second biannual Adelaide Film Festival as one of the most friendly and rewarding festivals he has experienced.

The 2005 festival incorporated the Australian International Documentary Conference 2005 (AIDC) "at a moment when documentary is in the ascendancy."

== Awards ==
Don Dunstan Award

The Don Dunstan Award was won by Dennis O'Rourke.
