= Anthony Maras =

Australian film director

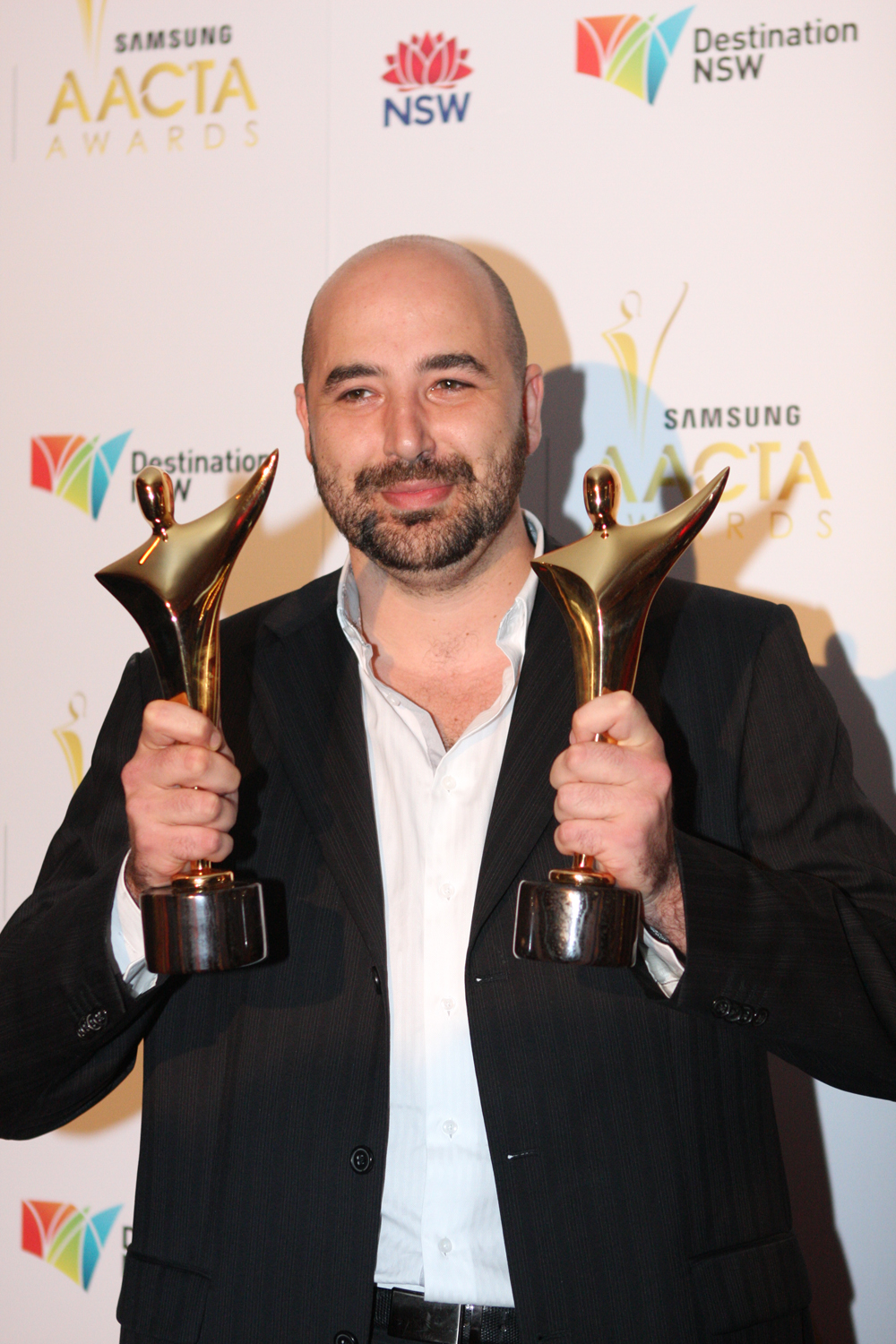
- Maras holding two AACTA Awards in 2012
- Born: May 27, 1981 (age 45); Adelaide, South Australia, Australia
- Occupations: Director; Producer; Writer

Anthony Maras is an Australian filmmaker. He directed the 2018 film Hotel Mumbai and the short films Azadi, Spike Up and The Palace.

== Career ==
Maras' first short film, Azadi, was one of the first Australian films exploring the plight of Afghan refugees in Australian detention centers. It was partially shot on location in the remote deserts of outback Australia, at the Baxter and Woomera detention centers where protests became mass riots involving the escape of hundreds of detainees, which Maras captured on camera and integrated into the finished film. Azadi won an AACTA Award for Best Short Fiction Film as did his next short film, the crime drama Spike Up.

Maras' short film The Palace about the 1974 Turkish invasion of Cyprus, was shot along the United Nations Green in Nicosia, and premiered at the 2011 Telluride Film Festival and won multiple awards internationally including Best Short Fiction Film and Best Screenplay in a Short Film at the 2012 Australian Academy of Cinema and Television Arts Awards (AACTA Awards).

Maras also worked as an associate producer on Last Ride (2009), the debut feature of director Glendyn Ivin and starred Hugo Weaving.

Maras' debut feature film Hotel Mumbai explores the 2008 Mumbai terror attacks and stars Dev Patel, Armie Hammer, Nazanin Boniadi, Anupam Kher and Jason Isaacs. The film enjoyed strong critical and audience acclaim and had its international theatrical release in 2019 after its world premiere at the 2018 Toronto International Film Festival. The film was shot both on location in Mumbai and in Maras' native Australia.

== Filmography ==
Year	Title	Director	Writing	Editing	Note
2005	Azadi	Yes	Yes	Yes	Short film
2007	Spike Up	Yes	Yes	Yes	Short film
2011	The Palace	Yes	Yes	Yes	Short film
2018	Hotel Mumbai	Yes	Yes	Yes	Co-written with John Collee
2026	Pressure	Yes	Yes	Yes	Co-written with David Haig
