= 2003 Adelaide Film Festival =

- Opening film: The Cuckoo
- Location: Adelaide, Australia
- Founded: 2002
- Awards: Don Dunstan Award (David Gulpilil)
- Directors: Katrina Sedgwick
- Festival date: 28 February – 7 March 2003
- Website: adelaidefilmfestival.org

The inaugural government-funded Adelaide International Film Festival (AIFF) took place in Adelaide, Australia, from 28 February to 7 March 2003, with screenings, special events and forums presented in various cinemas and locations. Established by South Australian Premier Hon. Mike Rann to stimulate the local film industry and celebrate the 30th anniversary of the South Australian Film Corporation, the festival showcases and explores contemporary screen culture with a program of screenings, special events and forum sessions.

The festival opened with the Australian premiere of Aleksandr Rogozhkin’s The Cuckoo. With a program of 150 screenings, this first festival was met with both critical acclaim and popular support. A third of the ninety ticketed screenings sold out.

An earlier independently-financed Adelaide Film Festival had been held from 1959 to 1980.

Katrina Sedgwick was the inaugural Festival Director. She had previously co-founded the 1995 Sydney Fringe Festival, was the Special Events Producer (1998, 2000) for the Adelaide Festival of Arts, and the Artistic Director for the 2002 Adelaide Fringe.

David Gulpilil received the 2003 Don Dunstan Award. for his contribution to the Australian film industry.

The festival poster depicted armchairs, floating like balloons.

== Board ==
Chair of the inaugural festival board was Sydney businesswoman Cheryl Bart. Her deputy was SAFC chief executive Judith Crombie. The other board members were Mojgan Khadem, Gabrielle Kelly, and Barry Loane.

== Awards ==
Don Dunstan Award

The inaugural Don Dunstan Award was won by David Gulpilil.
