= Marbury School, Aldgate =

Marbury School

Location
- Coordinates: 35°00′45″S 138°44′55″E

Marbury School was a private non-denominational co-educational R–12 progressive school, located in the Adelaide Hills at Aldgate, South Australia. When it was founded in 1971, Marbury was conceived as an incorporated non-profit association with a Board of Governors, who declared at the outset that it was a "co-educational, non-sectarian, independent, non-competitive, non-authoritarian school".

The name of the school was a portmanteau of the names of Margaret Edhouse (later Langley), Burwell Dodd, and Harry Edhouse, who were the founders. Edhouse was the Principal, and the Dodds provided much of the capital to purchase the grounds.

It was a small school, with one class for each year, and only about 15 students per class. In the early 1990s, there were about 150 students. Marbury was honoured in 1991 when one of its long-time students received the best score for a South Australian Year 12 student. Another student of Marbury School was the musician Sia.

From 1972 until its closure in 2004, the school was at 160 Mount Barker Road, Aldgate, using a property known as Wairoa, Aldgate, as well as surrounding properties. A portion of the property has since been purchased by The Hills Montessori School, as the location of its secondary (or "Wairoa") campus. The original mansion and historic gardens have continued in private ownership.

The school's main building (Wairoa) was used as the home of Col. and Mrs. Fitzhubert in the Australian film Picnic at Hanging Rock.

== See also ==
- https://web.archive.org/web/20111206091331/http://www.privateschoolsguide.com/view-user-profile/marbury-school-aldgate-sa.html
- Marbury film, 1988 part 1; part 2
