= Adelaide Film Festival Investment Fund =

- Location: Adelaide, South Australia
- Established: 2003
- Founder: Premier Mike Rann
- Operator: Adelaide Film Festival
- Website: adelaidefilmfestival.org/affif/

The Adelaide Film Festival Investment Fund was established in 2003 by the South Australian Premier, Mike Rann, to boost the local production of films.

When the American festival director Peter Sellars was director of the 2002 Adelaide Festival of Arts, he commissioned five films. Four of those films won awards, including The Tracker, Beneath Clouds and Walking on Water. That success prompted the State Government to provide the Adelaide Film Festival (AFF) with a production investment fund, which the AFF administers. Up to $1,000,000 is made available over a two-year period. The Adelaide Film Festival Board selects projects, based on recommendations from the Festival Director, and the slate of pictures produced premieres at the event.

To date, the Investment Fund has invested in seventy-two projects, including features, documentaries, short films and new media projects. These projects have won 70 international and 130 national awards. Adelaide remains one of the few festivals worldwide with an investment fund.

== Purpose ==
The Adelaide Film Festival aims to support the projects of strong creative teams. It uses creative criteria such as bold and innovative storytelling, and also requires projects to contribute culturally and economically to South Australia. These projects will bring development opportunities, branding opportunities, or partnerships with national and international organisations. They should have potential to raise the profile of South Australia.

== Museum of Modern Art (MoMA) ==
In 2011, the Museum of Modern Art in New York City hosted a week-long festival of Adelaide Film Festival Investment Fund films (from 7 to 13 April 2011).

The program included Look Both Ways, Ten Canoes, Samson and Delilah, Stunt Love, Boxing Day, Last Ride, My Year Without Sex and Mrs. Carey’s Concert.

== Hive Production FUND + LAB ==
In 2011, the Australian Broadcasting Corporation TV Arts & Entertainment and the Adelaide Film Festival joined forces to create the Hive Production Fund. The inaugural FUND supported the projects The Boy Castaways by Michael Kantor, I Want to Dance Better at Parties by Matthew Bate, and Tender by Lynette Wallworth.

The LAB is run in partnership between the Australia Council for the Arts, Screen Australia, ABC Arts and South Australian Film Corporation. A unique workshop environment, it fosters new opportunities for artists working in theatre, art, dance and other non-cinematic fields to collaborate with traditional screen practitioners. The LAB encourages art form cross-pollination – between practitioners, and between processes and creative approaches. The third and final LAB was scheduled to run during the 2015 Adelaide Film Festival.

== Sundance Institute ==
Adelaide Film Festival Investment Fund collaborates with Sundance Institute’s New Frontier program to identify potential opportunities for Australian artists and filmmakers to present new media work at future editions of the Sundance Film Festival.

New Frontier at Sundance Institute is a dynamic initiative intended to identify and foster independent artists working at the convergence of film, art, media, live performance, music and technology.

Since 2007, the New Frontier exhibition at the Sundance Film Festival has provided fiction, non-fiction and hybrid projects to showcase transmedia storytelling, multi-media installations, performances and films. It has a long presentation association of Australian work, including Lynette Wallworth’s Evolution of Fearlessness; Matthew Bate’s Sam Klemke's Time Machine; and Closer Productions’ My 52 Tuesdays project.

== Past projects ==
2018	2017	2016
_{FEATURE FILMS}	_{FEATURE FILMS}	_{FEATURE FILMS}
Hotel Mumbai	Cargo	Ali's Wedding
I Am Mother	Sweet Country	
The Nightingale		
_{DOCUMENTARY}	_{DOCUMENTARY}	_{DOCUMENTARY}
She Who Must Be Loved	After the Apology	David Stratton: A Cinematic Life
	Guilty	
_{SHORT FILMS}	_{SHORT FILMS}	_{TV SERIES}
Lucy and D.i.C.	Remembering Agatha	David Stratton's Stories of Australian Cinema
The Art of the Game	Oddlands	
Demonic	Making A Mark	
The Woman and the Car	Bromley's Suitcase	
Davi	_{TV SERIES}	
A Stone's Throw	F*!#ing Adelaide	
_{IMMERSIVE}	_{ART AND THE MOVING IMAGE}	
Running 62: The Arrival VR	Geoff Cobham: Already Elsewhere	
The Waiting Room	_{VIRTUAL REALITY}	
	The Summation of Force VR	
2015	2013	2011
_{FEATURE FILMS}	_{FEATURE FILMS}	_{FEATURE FILMS}
A Month of Sundays	52 Tuesdays	Hail
Girl Asleep	The Boy Castaways	Here I Am
Spear	Charlie's Country	Snowtown
	Tracks	
_{DOCUMENTARY}	_{DOCUMENTARY}	_{DOCUMENTARY}
Highly Strung	All This Mayhem	Life In Movement
Sam Klemke's Time Machine	Tender	Mrs Carey’s Concert
	The Darkside	Shut Up Little Man!
		The Tall Man
_{SHORT FILMS}	_{SHORT FILMS}	_{SHORT FILMS}
Michelle's Story	Muriel Matters!	Magic Harvest
Mood Machine	I Want to Dance Better at Parties	The Moment
My Best Friend is Stuck on the Ceiling	Welcome to Iron Knob	Stunt Love
Trent Parke - The Black Rose	Ringbalin: Breaking the Drought	The Palace
Upside Down Feeling	_{CROSS PLATFORM}	_{CROSS PLATFORM}
What We Know	My 52 Tuesdays	Danger 5
_{ART AND THE MOVING IMAGE}	_{ART AND THE MOVING IMAGE}	_{ART AND THE MOVING IMAGE}
Char Soo	Daniel Crooks, Pan No.11	Rekindling Venus: In Plain Sight
The Way of the Ngangkari		Stranded
2009	2007	2005
_{FEATURE FILMS}	_{FEATURE FILMS}	_{FEATURE FILMS}
Last Ride	Boxing Day	Look Both Ways
Lucky Country	Dr Plonk	Ten Canoes
My Tehran for Sale	Lucky Miles	
My Year Without Sex	The Home Song Stories	
Samson and Delilah		
_{DOCUMENTARY}	_{DOCUMENTARY}	_{DOCUMENTARY}
A Good Man	Forbidden Lie$	I Told You I Was Ill: Spike Milligan
	Kalaupapa – Heaven	
	Words from the City	
_{SHORT FILMS}	_{SHORT FILMS}	_{SHORT FILMS}
Necessary Games	Crocodile Dreaming	Azadi
Schadenfreude	Spike Up	Fritz Gets Rich
Salt	Sweet and Sour	Nascent
The Bully	Swing	
The Cat Piano	What the Future Sounded Like	
_{ART AND THE MOVING IMAGE}		_{CROSS PLATFORM}
Duality of Light		UsMob.com.au
