= Katrina Sedgwick =

Australian television producer and festival director

Katrina Sedgwick OAM
- Born: Katrina Anne-Marie Sedgwick; 27 December 1967 (age 58); Sydney, Australia
- Education: Marryatville High School
- Occupations: Museum and festival director
- Spouse: Chris Barker (m. 2010)
- Children: Two children
- Writing career
- Language: English
- Years active: 1977–present

Katrina Anne-Marie Sedgwick OAM (born 27 December 1967) is the Director & CEO of Melbourne Arts Precinct Corporation (MAP Co). Sedgwick was previously the Director & CEO of the Australian Centre for the Moving Image.

== Early life ==
Sedgwick was born in Sydney but grew up in Adelaide, where she attended Marryatville High School.

== Career ==
Sedgwick began her career as a nine-year-old performer in the Australian film classic The Last Wave, directed by Peter Weir. Her first job out of school was as a member of a traveling clown company.

Sedgwick also provided the voice of McDuff in the Australian children's TV series, Johnson and Friends, as well as being the character's costume actor for the first two seasons.

Sedgwick co-founded the Sydney Fringe Festival in 1995. Her "big break" was working with Nigel Jamieson, as the Associate Producer of the 1996 Adelaide Festival of Arts free outdoor program, Red Square. From there, she became Special Events Producer (1998, 2000) for the Adelaide Festival of Arts, Artistic Director of Come Out '99.

In 2001, she had her bags packed and "was about to leave Adelaide", when Premier Mike Rann asked her to oversee the creation of a new film festival.

From 2002 to January 2012, she was the founding Director and CEO of the Adelaide Film Festival and the Adelaide Film Festival Investment Fund, a delegate to the Prime Minister’s Australia 2020 Summit, and Chair of the South Australian Youth Arts Board [2003–2008]. She oversaw five festivals, then left to pursue other opportunities.

Sedgwick joined the Australian Broadcasting Corporation (ABC) in April 2012, where she commissioned a slate of programs, including: Autopsy on A Dream, The Art of Australia, I Want to Dance Better at Parties, Hannah Gadsby's Oz, The Real Mary Poppins, Art & Soul 2, and the AACTA-nominated documentaries Brilliant Creatures and Tender. She oversaw ongoing TV series The Book Club, Jennifer Byrne Presents and At the Movies. She chaired the ABC Arts Council and, according to Richard Finlayson, ABC’s Director of TV, established an ABC Arts brand that engaged with arts content across TV, Radio, News and Online.

Sedgwick resigned as Head of TV Arts at the ABC in February 2015, then took up the position of Director/CEO of the Australian Centre for the Moving Image in Melbourne.

In the 2020 Australia Day Honours Sedgwick was awarded the Medal of the Order of Australia (OAM) for "service to performing, screen, and visual arts administration".

== Personal life ==
Sedgwick is married to Chris Barker. They have two children.
