= Jules O'Loughlin =

Australian cinematographer

- Born: Sydney, New South Wales, Australia
- Education: Australian Film, Television and Radio School
- Years active: 2001–present

Jules O'Loughlin, ACS, ASC is an Australian cinematographer. He is known for his work on many television series, from the Indigenous Australian drama series Redfern Now (2013) to the 2022 American thriller series The Old Man, as well as feature films, from Kokoda (2006) to Jolt (2021), being nominated for an winning several awards during his career.

== Early life and education ==
Jules O'Loughlin completed a Master of Arts from the Australian Film, Television and Radio School in 2003.

He also completed a Diploma of Film and Television at TAFE NSW St Leonards (formerly known as North Sydney TAFE).

== Career ==
O'Loughlin is a cinematographer.

He is a member of the American Society of Cinematographers, the Australian Cinematographers Society, the Australian Academy of Cinema and Television Arts and IATSE Local 600 (International Cinematographers Guild).

== Filmography ==
=== Short film ===
Year	Title	Director
2001	Backtalk	Greg Moran
2003	Car Park	Darcy Yuille
2004	Burning Ambition	Alister Grierson
2004	Filatelista	Jakub Zaremba
2005	Bomb	Alister Grierson
2005	Behind the Plastic Bubble	Alister Grierson
2006	Pacific	Peter Carstairs
2009	Schadenfreude	Peter O'Brien
2009	Frances and Annie	Genevieve Clay-Smith
2010	The Colours of Home	Daniel Pront
2010	Pop	Tobias Andersson
2013	The Amber Amulet	Matthew Moore
2018	Apple	Steve Pasvolsky

=== Feature film ===
Year	Title	Director
2006	Kokoda	Alister Grierson
2007	September	Peter Carstairs
2009	In Her Skin	Simone North
2009	Dark Frontier	Kriv Stenders
2011	Sanctum	Alister Grierson
2012	Wish You Were Here	Kieran Darcy-Smith
2015	Krampus	Michael Dougherty
2016	The Whole Truth	Courtney Hunt
2016	The Duel	Kieran Darcy-Smith
2017	The Hitman's Bodyguard	Patrick Hughes
2019	Angel Has Fallen	Ric Roman Waugh
2020	Come Away	Brenda Chapman
2021	Jolt	Tanya Wexler

Documentary film

Year	Title	Director	Notes
2014	Deepsea Challenge 3D	John Bruno; Ray Quint; Andrew Wight	With John Stokes

=== Television ===
Year	Title	Director	Notes
2013	Redfern Now	Adrian Russell Wills; Beck Cole; Wayne Blair	3 episodes
2014-2015	Black Sails	Sam Miller; T.J. Scott; Clark Johnson; Michael Nankin; Steve Boyum	9 episodes
2019	See	Stephen Surjik; Salli Richardson	2 episodes
2021	Shark Beach with Chris Hemsworth	Sally Aitken	TV special
2022	The Old Man	Greg Yaitanes; Steve Boyum; Ben Semanoff; Jason Ensler	6 episodes
2022-2026	Percy Jackson and the Olympians	Anders Engström; James Bobin; Catriona McKenzie	8 episodes

Miniseries

Year	Title	Director	Notes
2018	The Pacific: In the Wake of Captain Cook with Sam Neill	Sally Aitken; Kriv Stenders	5 episodes
2022	Joe vs. Carole	Justin Tipping; Natalie Bailey	8 Episodes
2022	Ms. Marvel	Sharmeen Obaid-Chinoy	Episodes "Seeing Red" and "Time and Again"

== Awards and nominations ==
Year	Award	Category	Title	Result	Ref.
2022	American Society of Cinematographers	Outstanding Achievement in Cinematography	The Old Man : "IV"	Won	
2006	Australian Cinematographers Society	Features - Cinema	Kokoda	Won	
2007	Australian Cinematographers Society	Features - Cinema	September	Won	
2009	Australian Cinematographers Society	Features - Cinema	Dark Frontier	Won	
2009	Australian Cinematographers Society	Features - Cinema	Schadenfreude	Won	
2010	Australian Cinematographers Society	Fictional Drama Shorts	Pop	Won	
2011	Australian Cinematographers Society	Features - Cinema	In Her Skin	Won	
2011	Australian Cinematographers Society	Feature Film	Sanctum	Won	
2012	Australian Cinematographers Society	Features - Cinema	Wish You Were Here	Won	
2014	Australian Cinematographers Society	Telefeatures, TV Dramas & Mini Series	Redfern Now	Won	
2014	Australian Cinematographers Society	Telefeatures, TV Dramas & Mini Series	Black Sails	Won	
2016	Australian Cinematographers Society	Features - Cinema (Budget $2m and over)	Krampus	Won	
2016	Australian Cinematographers Society	Features - Cinema	The Duel	Won	
2020	Australian Cinematographers Society	Features - Cinema	Come Away	Won	
2021	Australian Cinematographers Society	Features - Cinema	Jolt	Won	
2022	Australian Cinematographers Society	Telefeatures, TV Dramas & Mini Series	Ms. Marvel	Won	
2022	Australian Cinematographers Society	Telefeatures, TV Dramas & Mini Series	The Old Man	Won	
2023	Australian Cinematographers Society	Telefeatures, TV Dramas & Mini Series	The Old Man	Won	
2013	Australian Academy of Cinema and Television Arts	Best Cinematography	Wish You Were Here	Nominated	
2014	Australian Academy of Cinema and Television Arts	Best Cinematography in Television	Redfern Now	Nominated	
2015	Australian Academy of Cinema and Television Arts	Best Cinematography in a Documentary	Deepsea Challenge 3D	Nominated	
