= List of My Place episodes =

This is a list of episodes of the Australian television series My Place.

== Series overview ==
Series	Episodes	Originally released	
Series	Episodes	First released	Last released
1	13	4 December 2009	22 December 2009
2	13	26 June 2011	18 September 2011

== Season 1: 2009 ==
No. overall	No. in season	Title	Directed by	Written by	Original release date	Prod. code
1	1	"Laura 2008"	Shawn Seet	Leah Purcell	4 December 2009	101
Summary: Laura and Soriya are mucking around in a dinghy on the bay when it floats out and sinks. Laura finds out that the boat belongs to her landlord Michaelis and an urn on the boat contained the ashes of his beloved dog. Laura has trouble owning up and apologising at the same time that the Prime Minister of Australia is making an apoplogy on behalf of the country to her mob. Cast: Maddie Madden as Laura, Pnina Hagege Dalton as Soriya, Bronwyn Penrith as Auntie Bev, Nicholas Papademetriou as Michaelis, Billy McPherson as Lenny, Leah Purcell as Ellen, Olivia Stambouliah as Teacher, Rebecca Massey as Mrs Benson, Kris McQuade as Bev's friend, Kane Stewart as Tony, Vince West as Terry, Angeline Penrith as Diane, Kiah Ferguson as Lorraine.
2	2	"Mohammed 1998"	Shawn Seet	Brendan Cowell	7 December 2009	102
Summary: Mohammed is a mad keen bowler and Shane Warne is his hero. When he turns up for the try-outs, he finds the team is a closed shop dominated by the captain Brian Hilliard and his father. Mohammed’s new friend Danielle invites him to join her girls’ team much to the hilarity of Brian and his mates. Cast: Narek Armaganian as Mohammed, Bridget Crowley as Danielle, Kris McQuade as Grandma, Wadih Dona as Omar, Anita Hegh as Emma, Tim Richards as Greg Hilliard, Jack Vergo as Brian Hilliard, Rebecca Massey as Mrs Benson, Bronwyn Penrith as Auntie Bev, Nicholas Papademetriou as Michaelis, Maria Angelopoulos as Sister.
3	3	"Lily 1988"	Shawn Seet	Greg Waters	8 December 2009	103
Summary: Lily is excited when cousin Phuong arrives with her parents from Vietnam but Phuong turns out to be in no need of help and a real threat to Lily’s status at home and at school. Cast: Sheena Pham as Lily, Maria Tran as Thi Mai, Caroline Nguyen as Phoung, Andrew Bibby as Mr McGrath, Rebecca Massey as Mrs Benson, Bronwyn Penrith as Auntie Bev, Nicholas Papademetriou as Michaelis, Nithya Bangalore as Anisha, Ljubica Peresic as Fatima, Cory Vi as Chinh, Quinn Le as Binh, Chris Cao as Tuan, Nicholas Boersch as Sean, Emma Leonard as Nerine, Lara Mythillos as Soldier, Toby Bowring as Convict.
4	4	"Mike 1978"	Michael James Rowland	Nicholas Parsons	9 December 2009	104
Summary: Mike knows a lot about Australian muscle cars from 1968 to 1978 but the other kids think he’s odd. He only has one friend, Ben. But is Ben really a friend? Cast: Will Cottle as Mike, Christopher Baker as the Tippy, Jamin Bennet as Ben, Ben Winspear as Michaelis, Amanda Bishop as Janice, Victoria Haralabidou as Yaya, Sam Parsonson as Jeff, Louisa Mignone as Sofia, Patti Tsarouhis as Nina, Rebecca Massey as Mrs Benson, Kane Johnson as Stuart, Flynn Colby as First Boy, Harry Greenwood as Pat, Matthew Cahill as Mark.
5	5	"Sofia 1968"	Michael James Rowland	Nicholas Parsons	10 December 2009	105
Summary: Sofia is a spy for the yayas (grandmothers). She tries to derail the budding romance of her brother Michaelis and his girlfriend Janice, before he leaves for Vietnam. Cast: Anastasia Feneri as Sofia, Ben Winspear as Michaelis, Amanda Bishop as Janice, Victoria Haralabidou as Mama, Jaz Allen as Mareka, Deborah Galanos as Yaya, Alex Blias as Baba, Maria Karagiannis as Second Yaya, Catina Hasapis as Third Yaya, Panda Likoudis as Cousin Yiannis, John Dellios as Manoulis, Stavroula Paphitis as Maroula, Kallu Koutsogiannis as Gina, Joanna Griffin as Teacher, Archie Oxenbould as Bowler, Jacob McHutchison as Fielder, Rebecca Massey as Mrs Benson.
6	6	"Michaelis 1958"	Michael James Rowland	Tim Pye	11 December 2009	106
Summary: Michaelis' family is from Kalymnos but he wants to be Australian, not Greek. Even more, he wants a television so he can watch 'Robin Hood' and be accepted by the McCormack brothers at the milk bar. Cast: Jonathan Kollias as Michaelis, Alex Blias as Baba, Victoria Haralabidou as Mama, Deborah Galanos as Yaya, Dimitri Solomou as Christos, Arky Michael as Kyrios Josephides, Angus Russo as Gil McCormack, Kurt Schlede as Tom McCormack, Annie Martin as Janice, Mary Dimitropoulos as Maroula, Rebecca Massey as Mrs Benson, Stephen Shanahan as Mr McCormack and Alexa Ashton as Mrs McCormack.
7	7	"Jen 1948"	Catriona McKenzie	Alice Addison	14 December 2009	107
Summary: Jen's father died in the war. Now her mum is planning to marry Wal, who even though he has a car, definitely doesn't match up to the war hero dad, in Jen's eyes. Cast: Monique Homes as Jen, Kate Box as Kath, Steve Rodgers as Wal, Susie Porter as Miss Miller, Emma Lung as Bridie, Luci Hughes as Janey, Nathalie Fenwick as Margie, Kieran Darcy-Smith as Grandfather, Chris Haywood as Mr O'Sullivan, Matthre Whittet as Mr McPhail, Scott Lowe as Foreman.
8	8	"Colum 1938"	Catriona McKenzie	Greg Waters	15 December 2009	108
Summary: Colum has two big ambitions; to stop his best mate Thommo's family from being kicked out of their house next door to his and to get up the nerve to ride his billy cart down Brick Pits Hill. Cast: Alfie Carslake as Colum, Joel Barker as Thommo, Kate Box as Kath, Emma Lung as Bridie, Laurence Breuls as Jack, Susie Porter as Miss Muller, Chris Haywood as Mr O'Sullivan, Kieran Darcy-Smith as Pa, Justin Smith as Joe Blake, Ryan Johnson as PC Moroney, Matthew Whittet as Mr McPhail, Leon Burchill as Sid, Blake Giles as Older Boy, Paul Gleeson as Mr Thomson, Rhonda Doyle as Housewife, Lester Morris as Old Man.
9	9	"Bridie 1928"	Samantha Lang	Gina Roncoli	16 December 2009	109
Summary: Bridie just wants to hang out with her big sister Kath and best friend Lorna, and be in on their secrets. After talking her way into tagging along, and wheeling her baby brother in his pram, Bridie sets off for what is meant to be a day of harmless fun and relaxation. Cast: Holly Fraser as Bridie, Brenna Harding as Kath, Aimee Patmore as Lorna, Susie Porter as Miss Muller, Alice McConnell as Mumma, Kieran Darcy-Smith as Pa, Felicity Price as Mrs Thomson, Paul Gleeson as Mr Thomson, Edmond Cinis as Declan, Leon Burchill as Sid, Zacharey Garred as Soldier.
10	10	"Bertie 1918"	Samantha Lang	Nicolas Parsons	17 December 2009	110
Summary: Bertie wants to raise money to buy a present for his brother Eddie who's coming home from the war and steals his friend's pet rabbit for his magic show. Cast: Shardyn Fahey-Leigh as Bertie, Leon Burchill as Sid, Paul Blackwell as Mr Watson, Ewen Leslie as Mr Bracey, Susie Porter as Miss Muller, Fiona Booker as Edna, Maeve Dermody as Evelyn, Eloise Oxer as Rose, Andrew Hazzard as Eddie, Sebastian Robitschko as Laurie, Marcello Mao as Accordion Player.
11	11	"Evelyn 1908"	Jessica Hobbs	Blake Ayshford	18 December 2009	111
Summary: Evelyn can't wait for cracker night and this year, for the first time, the family has their own box of fireworks. Unfortunately, Evelyn shows the box to her disbelieving neighbour Freddie with explosive results. Cast: Lucy Howroyd as Evelyn, Jack Versace as Eddie, Billy Shaw as Freddie Muller, Susie Porter as Miss Muller, Leon Ford as Vernon, Eloise Oxer as Rose, Sky Tse as Leck Wong, Harry Cook as Tom Muller, Russell Dykstra as Mr Merry, Cole Burgess as Urchin.
12	12	"Rowley 1898"	Jessica Hobbs	Tim Pye	21 December 2009	112
Summary: Rowley is convinced that good deeds will be rewarded, he'll do anything to help his mother and the other residents in the boarding house they live in. He longs for his father to come home but then he discovers that his father may never come home at all. Cast: Benson Anthony as Rowley, Sam Fraser as Tom Muller, Sacha Horler as Elsie, Russell Dykstra as Mr Merry, Fiona Press as Miss Singer, Wayne Pygram as Bill Bayliss, Paul Caesar as Russell Gartner, Wilson Moore as Jono Bayliss, Sky Tse as Leck Wong, Peter Lawless as Stan, Lucas Perry as Teacher.
13	13	"Victoria 1888"	Jessica Hobbs	Alice Addison	22 December 2009	113
Summary: Victoria and her family have just moved into the terrace house that her father built. But soon she realises that her father may be going broke. She'll do anything to ensure that they stay there for ever, including witchcraft. Miss Muller next door may be her inspiration. Then she realises that her witchcraft may be working in all the wrong ways. Cast: Eliza Saville as Victoria, Lochi Nazer-Hennings as Wesley, Ashleigh Ross as May, Susie Porter as Miss Muller, Dan Wyllie as Victoria's Father, Hayley McElhinney as Victoria's Mother, Dan Spielman as the Irish Tradesman, Odessa Young as Alexandra Owen, Isabel Wilson as Emma Owen, Shakira Mareka as the Aboriginal Girl, Owen Buick as the Dunny Can Man and Graeme Ware Jnr as Henry Muller.

== Season 2: 2011 ==
No. overall	No. in season	Title	Directed by	Written by	Original release date	Prod. code
14	1	"Henry 1878"	Michael James Rowland	Greg Waters	26 June 2011	201
Summary: Despite one failed invention after another, young Henry knows in his heart that he’s a brilliant inventor. Against the advice of his friend, Franklin, Henry conducts his biggest experiment ever… but succeeds only in blowing up the local schoolhouse. Expelled, Henry continues to believe there’s a living to be made from inventing weird and wonderful labour-saving machines. But his machines cause more trouble than they’re worth and after one of them goes berserk, wrecking Franklin’s family’s laundry business, Henry becomes an outcast. A near-tragedy in Franklin’s family gives Henry the opportunity to try one last experiment and save the day… but can he get it to work? Cast: Alexander Graham as Henry, Kevin Lou as Franklin, Eden Carnegie as Stanley, Angelina Yap as Mei-Lin, Jamie Oxenbould as Mr Twist, Sarah Snook as Minna, Bryce Youngman as Karl, Paul W. He as Leck Wong, Ivy Mak as Mrs Wong, Rob Carlton as Cornelius the Baker, Alice Ansara as Mrs Stockton.
15	2	"Minna 1868"	Michael James Rowland	Nick Parsons	3 July 2011	202
Summary: Minna lives with strict German-born parents who privately hope their young daughter’s friendship with the well-to-do Owen children – Toby, Harold and Adelaide – will do her some good. But Minna’s parents have no clue what these kids get up to when they’re on their own. Their favourite game is seeing who can scare the others the most. But when the Owens blame Minna for a disaster caused by their own children, she decides to give them the fright of their life. Unwisely, Minna helps herself to her friend Leck’s beloved magic lantern to carry out her revenge and soon she is in more trouble than ever. Cast: Charlie Rose MacLennan as Minna, Abbey McPherson as Adelaide, Jarin Towney as Leo, Oscar Vertes as Toby, Paul W. He as Leck, Andrew Ryan as Harold Owen, Merran Winchester as Beatrice, Julian Pulvermacher as Vati, Anja Raith as Mutti, Ben Purser as Wolf, Meegan Warner as Eva, Bryce Youngman as Karl, Alice Ansara as Mrs Stockton, Paul Hooper as Harold's Man #1, Alex Nicholas as Harold's Man #2.
16	3	"Ben 1858"	Michael James Rowland	John Alsop & Blake Ayshford	10 July 2011	203
Summary: Ben’s one wish is for his wandering American family to be able to celebrate a proper Thanksgiving dinner in their new place with a real roast turkey. But his efforts to earn the money to buy a turkey plunge him into escalating rivalry with a local Chinese boy, Leck. Their competition leads to one mishap after another until they realise they might be better off co-operating than fighting. But is it too late? And if Ben does succeed, will his family move on again? Cast: Lachlan Elliott as Ben, James Tsang as Leck, Stephen Anderton as Mr John Owen, Molly Ellison as Beth, Nataisha Gross as Amy, Septimus Caton as Walt, Melanie Munt as Clara, Andrew Ryan as Harold Owen, Matilda Brown as Maryann, Derek Walker as George, Merran Winchester as Beatrice Owen, Graham Rouse as Mr Wilson, Alice Ansara as Mrs Stockton, Sarah Cooper as Annie Priestly, Amber Mitrani as Eliza Priestly, Roderic Byrnes & Geordie McBain as Tavern Patrons.
17	4	"Johanna 1848"	Rachel Ward	Alice Addison	17 July 2011	204
Summary: Johanna lives with her grandmother, Sarah. Johanna doesn’t go to school. She has a job – every day she pushes a barrow-load of potatoes around the town, delivering them to her grandmother’s customers. She works like a donkey and the Owen children treat her like one. But do they have the right to be so superior? Johanna is aware of a lot of whispering about her parentage and she becomes determined to find out who her father really is. Granny Sarah’s not telling and the rest of the town maintain a conspiracy of silence. Then Johanna discovers a vital clue: her father has one leg shorter than the other. She starts to investigate but is unprepared for a shocking discovery. Cast: Emma Jefferson as Johanna, Alexandra Schepisi as Granny Sarah, Matilda Brown as Maryann, Dylan Boyd ad Edgar, Siobhan Eke as Christabel, Stephen Anderton as Mr John Owen, Vincent Stone as Schoolmaster, Danielle Jackson as Vickers' Maid, Betty Tougher as Potter's Housekeeper, Celia Ireland as Banks' Maid, Derek Walker as George, Alice Ansara as Mrs Stockton, Boris Brkic as Willie the Boatman, Adrian Barnes as Publican, Sam Haft as Builder, Greg Poppleton as Mate #1, Ben Johan Brunekeef as Mate #2, Greg Hatton as Mate #3, Grant Cartwright as Moustached Man, Renee Bowen as Johanna's Stunt Double.
18	5	"Davey 1838"	Rachel Ward	John Alsop	24 July 2011	205
Summary: When Davey, working as a stable boy for the powerful Owen family, learns that his favourite horse – Duchess – is to be sold to the local tannery, he puts everything on the line to save her. He steals the horse, determined to run away with her and to live wild and free like the bushrangers. He hugs his mother goodbye and is making his getaway when he witnesses a band of real bushrangers at their villainy. Davey’s master Mr Owen – the man who ordered Duchess to the tannery – lies shot and possibly dying on a remote road. Should Davey go on the run as planned? Or help his badly wounded master back to the farm and risk a terrible punishment for stealing a horse? Cast: Joseph Ireland as Davey, Karl Elbourne as Rupert, Jeremy Pennings as Harold, Derek Walker as George, Stephen Anderton as Mr John Owen, Ben Owenbould as Mr Owen, Kate Bell as Alice, Alexandra Schepisi as Sarah, Matilda Brown as Maryann, Kate Mulvany as Mrs Owen, Josh Messina as Bushranger, Graham Ware (SNR) as Trooper, Jayden Blackner as Davey Riding Double.
19	6	"Alice 1828"	Rachel Ward	John Alsop	31 July 2011	206
Summary: Alice and her friend, George, have each adopted a piglet as their own. Alice’s piglet is called Wilhelmina and George’s is called Benny. When Alice’s father declares a half-day picnic, Alice and George propose a pig race between Wilhelmina and Benny as part of the entertainment. Alice’s siblings – Maryann and Little Sam – enter a third pig in the race, a lumbering old sow named Oink. Oink doesn’t strike Alice or George as posing much of a threat but they each fear defeat from the other’s entry. And that’s when the skulduggery begins. There’s no end to the sneakiness Alice and George will employ against each other in order to win first prize: a cake baked by Sarah. But have they overlooked something? Cast: Victoria Shaw as Alice, Michael Cochrane (JNR) as George, Charlotte McSweeny as Maryann, Aidan McSweeny as Little Sam, Linal Haft as Old Freddie, Sam Cottom as Sam, Alexandra Schepisi as Sarah, Boris Brkic as Wille the Boatman, Chris Leaney as Shell Digger, Colin Borgonon as Convict Wag, Ben Oxenbould as Mr Owen, Kate Mulvany as Mrs Owen, Stephen Anderton as Mr John Owen.
20	7	"Charles 1818"	Samantha Lang	Alice Addison	7 August 2011	207
Summary: Charles and his older brother John are both expected to work on their parents’ farm. Charles loves it but John is lazy, shirking the work at every turn. Both boys will soon be sent to England to learn how to become refined, young gentlemen. This doesn’t appeal to Charles who sets out to make himself indispensable on the Owen family property so he won’t have to go. And that’s when he strikes a deal with a stranger: an escaped convict who agrees to help Charles in exchange for food and freedom. But it’s a devil’s bargain and Charles finds himself being held to ransom for ever-increasing demands from the convict. In the end, having learnt some unexpected things – about himself and his brother – from the convict, Charles helps the escapee avoid the police by providing him with an hilarious disguise. But will it help Charles avoid being sent to school in England? Cast: Simon Garratt as Charles, Nicholas Bakopoulos-Cooke as John Owen, Sam North as Liam, Ben Oxenbould as Mr Owen, Kate Mulvany as Mrs Owen, Alexandra Schepisi as Sarah, Sam Cotton as Sam, Nathan Lovejoy as Chaplin, Martin Thomas as Young Trooper.
21	8	"Sarah 1808"	Samantha Lang	Alice Addison	14 August 2011	208
Summary: Sarah, though still a child, works as a servant for the cold and demanding Mrs Owen. As if being bossed around by the lady of the house isn’t bad enough, Sarah has to deal with that woman’s sly and sickly daughter, Alice. Alice is as mean as her mother and twice as cunning. She sets out to make Sarah’s life a misery, always trying to get her in trouble. But the two girls have more in common than they realise. They are both prisoners – Sarah to an impossible workload, Alice to a life-threatening illness. A truce of sorts, arising from a shared love of mischief, could lead to lasting friendship between the two girls. But how much time do they really have? Cast: Kate Harding as Sarah, Thomasina George as Alice Owen, Kate Mulvany as Mrs Owen, Ben Oxenbould as Mr Owen, Sam Cotton as Sam, Shaka Cook as Aboriginal Young Man, Jaylene Bolt as Aboriginal Girl, Rikka Shillingsworth as Aboriginal Mother, Stephanie Storm Ducket as Aboriginal Baby.
22	9	"Sam 1798"	Samantha Lang	Blake Ayshford	21 August 2011	209
Summary: Sam is a child convict, arrested in London for stealing a jacket. Now, having lived his whole life in towns and cities, he’s sent to an isolated farm on the edge of the bush. Keen to impress, Sam tells his new master, Mr Owen, that he knows all about farming. Then Mr Owen, with business to attend to elsewhere, leaves Sam on his own, in charge of the house, the farm and one terrible goat named Katie. Sam has a long list of jobs to do and it’s like the goat’s main aim in life is to make it as hard as possible for Sam to get them done and stay out of trouble. And then the goat disappears and Sam has to endure a night in the scary bush to try to get Katie back. Can he survive and who will help him finish his tasks before Mr Owen returns? Cast: Jack Tompsett as Sam, Lindsay Farris as Earl, George Sheppard as Wood, Ben Oxenbould as Mr Owen, Kadeem Wayne Bamblett as Aboriginal Boy, Judd Wild as Sam Stunt Double.
23	10	"Dan 1788"	Unknown	Unknown	28 August 2011	210
Summary: Dan is on his second patrol to the Botany Bay area when he’s asked to capture a native dog to take back to the colony’s Governor. Only trouble is, the dog in question – Lapa – belongs to Waruwi, a girl Dan befriended last time he was in the area. Dan protests that it’s stealing but his commander overrules his objection and orders him to stand guard over the dog. At first Dan thinks he can pay Waruwi for her dog but when he sees that all she wants is Lapa back, he decides to disobey orders and return the dog to her. Now Dan is caught in a trap: he can’t stay with Waruwi and he can’t go back unless he wants to be flogged for disobedience. Cast: Jared Ziegler as Dan, Leonie Whyman as Waruwi, Martin Jacobs as Roberts, Charlie Garber as Goodwin, Leigh Scully as Marine #1, Benedict Samuel as Marine #2, Ben Wood as Cook, Baykali Ganambarr as Aboriginal Boy #1, Wakara Gondara as Aboriginal Boy #2.
24	11	"Waruwi 1788"	Michael James Rowland	Wayne Blair	4 September 2011	211
Summary: Waruwi is an Aboriginal girl looking after her grandmother while the rest of her extended family are away from camp. It’s just for a day but what a day it turns out to be. First there’s a huge four-legged monster that even spooks Waruwi’s dingo, Lapa. Then there’s a boy – a young soldier – banging loudly on a mysterious round thing (a drum, it turns out). And another soldier who makes agonised cries come out of a box with a handle (a hurdy-gurdy). And still more soldiers – ones Waruwi’s mother calls the walking grubs. They’ve got guns and they’re looking for the four-legged monster and their search is bringing them closer and closer to Waruwi’s camp and her annoying, adorable Nana. Outnumbered, Waruwi will have to use all her wits to lead the soldiers away from her place. Can she possibly make friends with the drummer boy? Can she save the day? Cast: Leonie Whyman as Waruwi, Jared Ziegler as Dan, Ningali Lawford-Wolf as Nana, Roger Mason as Hurdy-Gurdy Marine, Leigh Scully as Marine #1, Benedict Samuel as Marine #2, Baykali Ganambarr as Aboriginal Boy #1, Wakara Gondarra as Aboriginal Boy #2.
25	12	"Bunda Before Time"	Catriona McKenzie	Dallas Winmar	11 September 2011	212
Summary: Bunda has a problem. His older brother, Garadi, acts like Bunda doesn’t exist. Bunda does everything to try to get his older brother’s attention: he steals Garadi’s honey; he tries to copy Garadi’s athletic feats; he throws his brother’s spear in the river. And for his trouble, all Bunda gets is his brother’s anger and contempt. Their father decides to take them deeper into the bush to try and teach them a lesson but the boys are so intent on fuelling their feud that they miss the point of the challenges their father sets them. Will they ever learn how to stop teasing each other and become friends as well as brothers? Cast: Darcy McGrath as Bunda, Trevor Jamieson as Father, Aaron McGrath as Garadi, Judd Wild as Bunda Stunt Double.
26	13	"Barangaroo Before Time"	Catriona McKenzie	Tony Briggs	18 September 2011	213
Summary: Barangaroo’s world would be perfect if only Mani, the biggest boy in her tribe, would stop trying to be Number One. Deep down Mani knows she’s better than he is. That’s why he keeps shutting her out from important adventures – to make himself look good. But when a little boy (Mung) goes missing, Barangaroo and Mani are forced to follow his trail into a scary gully ruled by a legendary monster: the Mumuga. The Mumuga has a ferocious howl that echoes across the land. He’s said to knock kids unconscious with the smell of his horrible farts and drag them away into his cave. Who will have the courage to rescue Mung? What’s the real story about the Mumuga? And what does it take to be a real leader? Cast: Brooklyn Doomagee as Barangaroo, Elijah Button as Mani, Bailey Doomagee as Mung, Lincoln Hambrick as Badjal, Kamil Ellis as Wadi, Lila Kirby as Wiyanga.
