= Leesa Kahn =

Australian film producer

Leesa Kahn is an Australian film producer who produced films such as Kokoda, In Her Skin, Sanctum, and Come Away. She started producing short films before transitioning to feature films.

== Filmography ==
Year	Title	Notes
2003	Car Park	Short film
2004	Flight	Short film
2004	Burning Ambition	Short film
2005	Bomb	Short film
2005	Behind the Plastic Bubble	Short film
2006	Kokoda	Theatrical film
2009	Tackling Peace	Documentary film Executive Producer
2009	In Her Skin	Theatrical film Executive producer
2009	Sanctum	Theatrical film Associate producer
2020	Come Away	Theatrical film
