= Blue-Tongue Films =

Australian film collective

- Type: Privately held for-profit collective
- Industry: Filmmaking
- Founded: 1996
- Headquarters: Sydney, Australia
- Key people: Kieran Darcy-Smith; Luke Doolan; Joel Edgerton; Nash Edgerton; Mirrah Foulkes; Sean Kruck; David Michôd; Spencer Susser
- Website: bluetonguefilms.com

Blue-Tongue Films is an Australian film collective and production company, composed of filmmakers Kieran Darcy-Smith, Luke Doolan, Joel Edgerton, Nash Edgerton, Mirrah Foulkes, Sean Kruck, David Michôd and Spencer Susser.

== History ==
Founded in 1996, Blue-Tongue has created a number of feature films as Animal Kingdom, Hesher, The Square, Wish You Were Here, and The Gift, several short films, including Bear, Crossbow, The Magician, I Love Sarah Jane, Miracle Fish and Spider, the television series Mr Inbetween, as well as music videos for artists such as Ben Lee, Bob Dylan, Brandon Flowers, Empire of the Sun, Eskimo Joe, Evermore, Lana Del Rey, Missy Higgins, Rahzel, and The Veronicas.

In 2022, it was reported that Netflix would pick up The Stranger, both of which would have an Australian release in theaters and on Netflix.

== Filmography ==
=== Feature films ===
Feature films produced by Blue-Tongue and involvement of its members
Year	Title	Notes
2005	The Magician	Produced and Edited by Nash Edgerton; Luke Doolan: Additional Editor
2008	The Square	Directed by Nash Edgerton; Co-written by Joel Edgerton; Starring Kieran Darcy-Smith, Luke Doolan and Joel Edgerton; Joel and Nash Edgerton: Executive Producers; Edited by Luke Doolan and Nash Edgerton
2010	Animal Kingdom	Written and Directed by David Michôd; Starring Joel Edgerton, Mirrah Foulkes, Kieran Darcy-Smith, David Michôd and Luke Doolan (uncredited); Edited by Luke Doolan
2010	Hesher	Directed, Produced and Edited by Spencer Susser; Written by Spencer Susser and David Michôd; Nash Edgerton: Stunt Coordinator, Stunt Double and Editorial Consultant
2012	Wish You Were Here	Co-written and Directed by Kieran Darcy-Smith; Starring Joel Edgerton; Nash Edgerton: Stunt Coordinator
2013	Felony	Written and Produced by Joel Edgerton; Starring Joel Edgerton; Nash Edgerton: Stunt Coordinator and Stunt Double
2014	The Rover	Written, Produced and Directed by David Michod; Based On A Story by David Michôd and Joel Edgerton; Nash Edgerton: Minor Role and Stunts.
2015	The Gift	Written, Produced and Directed by Joel Edgerton; Starring Joel Edgerton, Mirrah Foulkes and Nash Edgerton; Edited by Luke Doolan; Nash Edgerton: Artistic Advisor, Stunt Coordinator and Additional Editor.
2017	War Machine	Written and Directed by David Michôd
2018	Gringo	Directed and Produced by Nash Edgerton; Starring Joel Edgerton; Edited by Luke Doolan; Sean Kruck: 2nd Unit Director
2018	Boy Erased	Directed, Produced, Written, and Starring Joel Edgerton; Nash Edgerton: Executive Producer
2019	The King	Directed by David Michôd; Written and Produced by Joel Edgerton and David Michôd; Nash Edgerton: 2nd Unit Director
2019	Judy and Punch	Written & Directed by Mirrah Foulkes; Produced by Nash Edgerton
2022	The Stranger	Written & Directed by Thomas M. Wright; Produced and Starring Joel Edgerton

=== Television ===
Television produced by Blue-Tongue and involvement of its members
Year	Title	Notes
2018	Mr Inbetween - Season 1	Executive Produced and Directed by Nash Edgerton; Starring David Michôd
2019	Mr Inbetween - Season 2	Executive Produced and Directed by Nash Edgerton; Starring Kieran Darcy-Smith, Nash Edgerton, Mirrah Foulkes and David Michôd

=== Short films ===
Short films produced by Blue-Tongue and involvement of its members
Year	Title	Notes
1996	Loaded	Directed by Kieran Darcy-Smith and Nash Edgerton; Written by Kieran Darcy-Smith; Starring Kieran Darcy-Smith, Joel Edgerton and Nash Edgerton.; Edited by Nash Edgerton
1996	Jac Et Bill	Directed by Joel Edgerton; Written by Joel Edgerton; Starring Kieran Darcy-Smith; Stunts: Nash Edgerton
1997	Deadline	Produced, Written, Edited and Directed by Nash Edgerton; Starring Nash Edgerton; Joel Edgerton: Camera Operator
1998	Bloodlock	Directed by Nash Edgerton and Kieran Darcy-Smith; Written by Kieran Darcy-Smith and Joel Edgerton; Produced by Kieran Darcy-Smith, Joel Edgerton and Nash Edgerton; Starring Kieran Darcy-Smith, Joel Edgerton and Nash Edgerton; Edited by Nash Edgerton
2000	The Island	Written and Directed by Kieran-Darcy-Smith; Starring Kieran Darcy-Smith
2001	The Pitch	Directed by Nash Edgerton; Written by Joel Edgerton and Nash Edgerton; Starring Kieran Darcy-Smith, Joel Edgerton and Nash Edgerton; Edited by Nash Edgerton; Stunts: Nash Edgerton
2003	Fuel	Directed by Nash Edgerton; Edited by Luke Doolan and Nash Edgerton; Sean Kruck: Assistant Camera
2005	Lucky	Written and Directed by Nash Edgerton; Starring Nash Edgerton; Edited by Luke Doolan and Nash Edgerton; Spencer Susser: Camera Operator and Sound Recordist
2005	A Love Story	Written, Produced, Edited and Directed by Spencer Susser
2005	The IF Thing	Directed by Nash Edgerton; Written by Nash Edgerton and David Michôd; Starring Kieran Darcy-Smith, Joel Edgerton, Nash Edgerton, David Michôd; Cinematography and Editing by Luke Doolan.
2006	Magic Happens: The Story of 'The Magician'	Written, Directed and Edited by Luke Doolan; Produced by Nash Edgerton; Starring Luke Doolan and Nash Edgerton; Cinematography by Luke Doolan
2007	Crossbow	Written and Directed by David Michôd; Starring Joel Edgerton, Mirrah Foulkes, David Michôd, Luke Doolan and Nash Edgerton; Edited by Luke Doolan
2007	Spider	Directed by Nash Edgerton; Written by Nash Edgerton and David Michôd; Starring Nash Edgerton, Mirrah Foulkes, Joel Edgerton and David Michôd; Edited by Luke Doolan and Nash Edgerton; Stunts: Nash Edgerton
2008	I Love Sarah Jane	Directed and Edited by Spencer Susser; Written by David Michôd and Spencer Susser; Nash Edgerton and Spencer Susser: Executive Producers; Nash Edgerton: Stunt Coordinator and Additional Editor
2008	The List	Written and Directed by Joel Edgerton; Starring Kieran Darcy-Smith, David Michôd and Nash Edgerton; Cinematography and Editing by Luke Doolan; Nash Edgerton: Stunts
2008	Netherland Dwarf	Written and Directed by David Michôd; Starring Mirrah Foulkes
2008	Summer Breaks	Written and Directed by Sean Kruck; Stunts: Nash Edgerton
2009	Miracle Fish	Written and Directed by Luke Doolan; Starring Kieran Darcy-Smith; Nash Edgerton: Executive Producer
2009	Inside the Square	Directed by David Michôd; Starring Kieran Darcy-Smith, Luke Doolan, Joel Edgerton, Nash Edgerton and David Michôd; Produced by Luke Doolan and Nash Edgerton; Edited by Luke Doolan; Camera Operators: Luke Doolan, David Michôd and Spencer Susser
2011	Monkeys	Written and Directed by Joel Edgerton; Produced by Luke Doolan and Joel Edgerton; Cinematography and Editing by Luke Doolan; Nash Edgerton and Spencer Susser: Additional Editing
2011	Bear	Directed and Edited by Nash Edgerton; Written by Nash Edgerton and David Michôd; Starring Nash Edgerton; Spencer Susser: Additional Camera Operator and Pre-Visualization
2012	Cryo	Directed by Luke Doolan; Starring Mirrah Foulkes; Fight Choreography by Joel and Nash Edgerton
2012	Eugene	Directed by Spencer Susser; Written by Mirrah Foulkes and Spencer Susser; Nash Edgerton: Additional Editing
2012	Dumpy Goes To The Big Smoke	Written and Directed by Mirrah Foulkes; Produced by David Michôd; Edited by Nash Edgerton
2013	The Captain	Written, Directed and Edited by Nash Edgerton and Spencer Susser.; Starring Nash Edgerton, Joel Edgerton and David Michôd.
2014	Snowblind	Written and Directed by Sean Kruck; Edited by Nash Edgerton
2014	Florence Has Left The Building	Written and Directed by Mirrah Foulkes; Nash Edgerton: Stunt Coordinator
2016	Trespass	Written and Directed by Mirrah Foulkes; Spencer Susser: Additional Photography
2021	Save Ralph	Written and directed by Spencer Susser; Starring Taika Waititi, Ricky Gervais, and Zac Efron
