= Luke Doolan =

Australian film editor & director

Luke Doolan is an Australian film editor and director. He was nominated for an Academy Award for Best Live Action Short Film and he is the winner of three Australian Film Institute Awards.

== Collaboration ==
Doolan is part of a network of young Australian filmmakers who collaborate on projects, called Blue-Tongue Films. Others in the group include Nash and Joel Edgerton, David Michôd, Kieran Darcy-Smith .

== Movies ==
In 2010, Doolan was nominated for an Academy Award as a best live-action short for his 17-minute film Miracle Fish. It was made with a producer Drew Bailey. Doolan filmed Miracle Fish at his 10-year-old sister's school, Annandale North Public School. Some scenes were shot at Matraville Sports High.

== Film credits ==
Year	Film	Director	Notes
2007	Spider	Nash Edgerton	Short film
2008	The Square	Nash Edgerton	
2008	Ten Empty	Anthony Hayes	
2010	Miracle Fish	Himself	Short film Also writer & director AACTA Award for Best Short Fiction Film; AACTA Award for Best Screenplay in a Short Film; Nominated—Academy Award for Best Live Action Short Film
2010	Animal Kingdom	David Michôd	AACTA Award for Best Editing; Nominated—ASE Award for Best Editing in a Feature Film; Nominated—Inside Film Award for Best Editing
2012	Cyro	Himself	Short film Australian Screen Sound Guild - Best Achievement in Sound for a Short Film 2012; National Irish Science Fiction Film Awards (Golden Blasters) - Silver Blaster 2012
2015	Backtrack	Michael Petroni	
2015	The Gift	Joel Edgerton	
2016	Colossal	Nacho Vigalondo	
2018	Gringo	Nash Edgerton	
2019	The Kill Team	Dan Krauss	
2024	Sting	Kiah Roache-Turner	co-edited with Kiah Roache-Turner and Jeff Cummings
2025	Ice Road: Vengeance	Jonathan Hensleigh	
2026	They Will Kill You	Kirill Sokolov	
