= West (2007 film) =

- Promotional poster
- Directed by: Daniel Krige
- Written by: Daniel Krige
- Produced by: Matthew Reeder; Anne Robinson
- Starring: Khan Chittenden; Nathan Phillips; Gillian Alexy; Michael Dorman
- Cinematography: Damian Wyvill ACS
- Edited by: Roland Gallois
- Music by: Andrew Lancaster; David McCormack; Johnette Napolitano
- Release date: 5 July 2007
- Running time: 99 minutes
- Country: Australia
- Language: English

West is a 2007 Australian film written and directed by Daniel Krige and starring Khan Chittenden, Nathan Phillips, Gillian Alexy and Michael Dorman. The film had its world premiere at the 2007 Berlin International Film Festival and was scheduled for Australian release on 5 July 2007 at the Chauvel Cinema in Sydney and the Nova Cinema in Melbourne with other cities to follow.

Johnette Napolitano of Concrete Blonde fame is the main vocalist on the score to West. She also sings the title song, "Falling in Love".

== Premise ==
Pete and Jerry are cousins living in Sydney's western suburbs, where they both fall in love with the same girl.

== Cast ==
- Khan Chittenden as Pete
- Nathan Phillips as Jerry
- Gillian Alexy as Cheryl
- Michael Dorman as Mick
- Blazey Best as Bunny
- David Field as Doug
- Felicity Price as Elizabeth

== Reception ==
Matt Ravier of In Film Australia gave the film a negative review, noting "[t]he wrong-side-of-the-tracks film is an indie staple stateside. This Australian variant doesn’t succeed in updating the well-worn genre and seems happy to simply recycle the classic coming-of-age elements of more successful productions." Margaret Pomeranz of ABC's At the Movies provided a more favourable reception concluding that it "may not be an easy film for audiences but for me it was a tremendously moving and rewarding experience."

== Box office ==
West grossed $57,472 at the box office in Australia.

== See also ==
- Cinema of Australia
