= The Big Dog (film) =

2023 film

- Directed by: Dane McCusker
- Written by: Dane McCusker
- Produced by: Jessica Murphy; Claudia Shepherd
- Starring: Julian Garner; Felicity Price; Asha Boswarva
- Cinematography: Oliver Hay
- Edited by: Jarrod Young
- Music by: Sam Weiss
- Release date: 2023
- Running time: 83 minutes
- Country: Australia
- Language: English

The Big Dog is a 2023 Australian comedy film written and directed by Dane McCusker.

== Cast ==
- Julian Garner as Richard Morgan
- Felicity Price as Kelly Morgan
- Asha Boswarva as Paige
- Michael Monk as Sam Morgan

== Reception ==
On review aggregator Rotten Tomatoes, the film has an approval rating of 75% based on 8 reviews.

Writing in The Sydney Morning Herald Jake Wilson gave it 2 1/2 stars stating "But while the antic tone is never entirely dropped, the comic pay-offs never really arrive – and by the time Richard is lying on the floor crying and Sam is mumbling ominously about a “day of reckoning”, it's clear McCusker is aiming for something other than low farce, or indeed the highbrow heartlessness of a Haneke." Jim Schembri on jimschembri.com gave it 2 stars calling it a "a prime example of a great idea that loses its way."

In the AU Review Paul Gray gives it 3 1/2 stars and states "Packaged around a dynamic that’s probably more common than we believe, the conversations that the film brings forward are perhaps meatier than the entire execution, but however uncomfortable we may find The Big Dog‘s dealings, it can’t be denied how impactful McCusker’s film is overall." Screen Hub Stephen A Russell gives it 3 1/2 stars concluding "Marking McCusker as one to watch, this hangdog tale goes for broke and its bark has bite too. Might just need a bit more meat on the bones next time."

== Awards ==
- 13th AACTA Awards
  - Best Original Music Score - Sam Weiss - nominated
