= Cactus (2008 film) =

- Film poster
- Directed by: Jasmine Yuen-Carrucan
- Written by: Jasmine Yuen-Carrucan
- Produced by: Paul Sullivan
- Starring: Travis McMahon; David Lyons; Bryan Brown; Shane Jacobson
- Cinematography: Florian Emmerich
- Edited by: Mark Perry
- Music by: Nerida Tyson-Chew
- Production company: Open Space Films
- Distributed by: Hoyts Distribution
- Release date: 1 May 2008
- Running time: 85 minutes
- Country: Australia
- Budget: A$1,200,000

Cactus is a 2008 Australian mystery-thriller film, it is the directing debut for Jasmine Yuen-Carrucan.

== Synopsis ==
Cactus is a road movie centred on a kidnapping.

=== Plot ===
The movie begins with John Kelly pulling Eli Jones (David Lyons) from his city residence, drugging him and driving across regional Australia for three days. On the journey, John and Eli begin to interact and talk, as well as having a run-in with a rogue cop and encountering "Thommo", a trucker.

== Cast ==
- Travis McMahon as John Kelly
- David Lyons as Eli Jones
- Bryan Brown as Rosco (the 'outback Cop')
- Shane Jacobson as Thommo
- Zoe Tuckwell-Smith as Sammy
- Daniel Krige as Mal
- Celia Ireland as Vesna
- Seymon Eckert as Katie
- John Martin as Petrol Attendant
- Steve Rodgers as Spuddo (voice)
- Wayne Walker as Ute Driver
- Cheyenne as Charlie Sparkles
- Craig Bartlett as Radio Operator
- Robert Whiteside as Bar Patron
- Russell Hunt as Bar Patron
- Robert Shearim as Bar Patron
- Elspeth Baird as Gardening woman

== Production ==
The directing debut of Jasmine Yuen Carrucan was shot in New South Wales in the cities of Bathurst, Broken Hill, Cobar, Sydney and Wilcannia. Bryan Brown worked on it as executive producer.

=== Style ===
The film uses many of the classic road movie motifs such as break downs, fuel stops and long stretches of empty road, with a cinematography that is conventionally modern.

== Release ==
The film premiered on 1 May 2008 in Australia. It was part of the Brooklyn International Film Festival in June 2008 and the Munich Film Festival on 28 June 2008.

== Cultural references ==
- Ford vs Holden rivalry

== See also ==
- Cinema of Australia
