= Gringo (2018 film) =

- Theatrical release poster
- Directed by: Nash Edgerton
- Screenplay by: Matthew Stone; Anthony Tambakis
- Story by: Matthew Stone
- Produced by: Rebecca Yeldham; Nash Edgerton; Charlize Theron; Beth Kono; A. J. Dix; Anthony Tambakis
- Starring: David Oyelowo; Charlize Theron; Joel Edgerton; Amanda Seyfried; Thandiwe Newton; Sharlto Copley
- Cinematography: Eduard Grau
- Edited by: Luke Doolan; David Rennie; Tatiana S. Riegel
- Music by: Christophe Beck
- Production companies: STXfilms; Blue-Tongue Films; Denver + Delilah Productions
- Distributed by: Amazon Studios; STX Entertainment (United States); Roadshow Films (Australia)
- Release date: March 9, 2018
- Running time: 110 minutes
- Countries: Australia; United States
- Language: English
- Box office: $11 million

Gringo is a 2018 action comedy film directed by Nash Edgerton, and written by Anthony Tambakis and Matthew Stone. The film stars David Oyelowo, Charlize Theron (who also produced), Joel Edgerton, Amanda Seyfried, Thandiwe Newton, and Sharlto Copley.

The film follows a mild-mannered businessman who is sent to Mexico to deliver an experimental marijuana pill. When he is kidnapped by a drug cartel, he must escape alongside a hired mercenary. The film is a product of the United States and Australia.

The film was released in the United States on March 9, 2018 by Amazon Studios and STXfilms.

== Plot ==
In the Chicago offices of Promethium Pharmaceuticals, co-presidents Richard Rusk and Elaine Markinson receive a call from a company employee, Harold Soyinka, who claims he has been kidnapped in Mexico and that his abductors are demanding a ransom of five million US dollars.

One day earlier, Harold, Richard, and Elaine arrive in Mexico; There, they meet Sanchez, the head of Promethium's Mexico plant. Unbeknownst to Harold, it is revealed that Sanchez has been selling Promethium's latest product, medical marijuana in the form of a pill, to a Mexican cartel. Promethium has decided to cut them off to avoid harming their upcoming merger. Later that evening, as Richard, Elaine and Harold have dinner, Harold secretly records Richard's and Elaine's conversations while he is away from the table. He learns from the recording the merger plans, which would result in Harold losing his job. That night, Harold also discovers that his wife is having an affair, and wants a divorce. Sanchez informs cartel leader Villegas about them getting cut off by Promethium. Villegas maims Sanchez and, believing that Harold is Promethium's boss, orders his capture.

Richard and Elaine leave Mexico the next morning without Harold, as he had seemingly disappeared. Harold, hiding away at a motel, convinces the motel's operators (brothers Ronaldo and Ernesto) to pretend to be kidnappers in an extortion plot in which he (Harold) calls Richard pretending to be kidnapped for a hefty ransom. Richard calls his former-mercenary-turned-humanitarian brother Mitch to rescue Harold.

Harold spends the evening at a bar, believing his scheme to have failed. The bartender alerts the cartel when he recognizes Harold. Two men arrive and kidnap Harold, but, while delivering him to Villegas, Harold overpowers them and crashes the car he and the other two men are in.

The next morning, Harold is rescued by tourists Sunny and Miles, the latter of whom is working as a drug mule. The two take Harold back to Ronaldo and Ernesto's motel where all three had been staying, where Sunny befriends him. Soon, Ronaldo and Ernesto, who have been bribed by the cartel into helping them, attempt to kidnap Harold. However, Mitch arrives, defeats the brothers, and takes Harold with him. Mitch takes Harold to the airport to return him to Chicago, but he runs away. Mitch subdues Harold and injects him with a microchip to know where he is at all times. The men get on good terms with one another and devise a scheme to extort Richard for more money. When Mitch calls Richard to make that deal, Richard tells him that the company is planning to collect a large life insurance claim on Harold if he were to die, part of which Mitch would receive. Mitch reluctantly agrees to kill Harold.

Harold and Mitch are spotted by Ronaldo and Ernesto on the streets. Mitch prepares to shoot Harold but cannot bring himself to do so as he has grown fond of him. The two are then attacked by the brothers, who kidnap Harold and take him to Villegas. Villegas kills the brothers and orders Harold to access a vault at the Promethium plant in order to steal the marijuana pill formula. There, a shootout occurs when the police arrive.

During the battle, "Angel", Harold's Mexican colleague and one of Villegas' men, whisks Harold away from the fight and reveals himself as an undercover DEA agent. They are chased by members of the cartel, who run them off the road. Harold saves "Angel" from being killed by a cartel member; as Harold is about to be executed by another cartel member, Mitch arrives and saves him only to be killed by the first cartel member, whom Harold finishes off. Harold asks "Angel" for help, believing that he has nothing to return to in Chicago. "Angel" agrees to make a false declaration Harold dead and Harold gives him company files incriminating Richard before leaving.

Villegas, his men, and Miles the drug mule are arrested by Mexican police, aided by "Angel". Richard is arrested by the DEA and imprisoned, and Elaine, who testified against Richard, takes over Promethium. Sanchez, despite his disability, settles down happily with his children. Harold, living quietly as "Harry Barnes," stays in Mexico, opens a beachside bar, and remains in contact with Sunny.

== Cast ==
- David Oyelowo as Harold "Harry" Soyinka
- Joel Edgerton as Richard Rusk
- Charlize Theron as Elaine Markinson
- Thandiwe Newton as Bonnie Soyinka
- Sharlto Copley as Mitch Rusk
- Harry Treadaway as Miles
- Amanda Seyfried as Sunny
- Carlos Corona as Juan Miguel "Pantera Negra" Villegas (Black Panther)
- Hernán Mendoza as Celerino Sanchez
- Diego Cataño as Ronaldo Gonzalez
- Rodrigo Corea as Ernesto Gonzalez
- Yul Vazquez as Angel Valverde
- Paris Jackson as Nelly
- Alan Ruck as Jerry
- Kenneth Choi as Marty
- Melonie Diaz as Mia
- Hector Kotsifakis as Roberto Vega
- Bashir Salahuddin as Stu
- Bill Maher as himself
- Harrison Jones as UNICEF volunteer

== Production ==
On May 12, 2014, Charlize Theron joined the cast of the film, then titled American Express. On December 10, 2015, David Oyelowo, Amanda Seyfried and Joel Edgerton joined the cast of the film. On March 11, 2016, Thandiwe Newton, Kenneth Choi, Harry Treadaway, Michael Angarano and Yul Vazquez joined the cast of the film. On May 11, 2016, STX Entertainment acquired distribution rights to the film. Principal photography began on March 7, 2016.

== Release ==
The film was released on March 9, 2018, by Amazon Studios and STXfilms.

=== Box office ===
Gringo has grossed $5 million in the United States and Canada, and $6 million in other territories, for a worldwide total of $11 million.

In the United States and Canada, Gringo was released alongside The Hurricane Heist, The Strangers: Prey at Night and A Wrinkle in Time, and was projected to gross around $5 million from 2,404 theaters in its opening weekend. However, after making just $997,000 on its first day, weekend estimates were lowered to $3 million. It ended up debuting to $2.6 million, finishing 11th at the box office, and marking the 27th worst wide opening of all-time. In its second weekend the film dropped 76% to $630,000, finishing in 17th and marking the 25th worst 2nd weekend drop in history. In its third weekend the film was pulled from 2,197 theaters (94.1%, the 21st worst such drop all-time) and grossed just $36,241.

=== Critical response ===
On review aggregator website Rotten Tomatoes, the film holds an approval rating of 40% based on 134 reviews, and an average rating of 5.0/10. The website's critical consensus reads, "Gringo rounds up a bafflingly overqualified cast for a misfire of a comedy that's fatally undermined by its messy plot, poorly conceived characters, and obvious debts to better films." On Metacritic, the film has a weighted average score of 46 out of 100, based on 33 critics, indicating "mixed or average" reviews. Audiences polled by CinemaScore gave the film an average grade of "C+" on an A+ to F scale.
