= The Gift (2015 American film) =

2015 film by Joel Edgerton

- Theatrical release poster
- Directed by: Joel Edgerton
- Written by: Joel Edgerton
- Produced by: Jason Blum; Rebecca Yeldham; Joel Edgerton
- Starring: Jason Bateman; Rebecca Hall; Joel Edgerton
- Cinematography: Eduard Grau
- Edited by: Luke Doolan
- Music by: Danny Bensi; Saunder Jurriaans
- Production companies: STX Entertainment; Blumhouse Productions; H. Brothers; Blue-Tongue Films; Ahimsa Films
- Distributed by: STX Entertainment (United States); Roadshow Films (Australia)
- Release dates: July 30, 2015 (L.A. Live); August 7, 2015 (United States); August 27, 2015 (Australia)
- Running time: 108 minutes
- Countries: United States; Australia
- Language: English
- Budget: $5 million
- Box office: $59 million

The Gift is a 2015 psychological thriller film written, co-produced, and directed by Joel Edgerton in his feature directorial debut, and co-produced by Jason Blum and Rebecca Yeldham. The film stars Jason Bateman and Rebecca Hall as Simon and Robyn Callem, a couple intimidated by a figure from Simon's past, played by Edgerton.

It was released in the United States on August 7, 2015, as the first film released by STX Entertainment. The film grossed $59 million worldwide on a budget of $5 million and received positive reviews from critics, who praised Edgerton's direction and screenplay, as well as Bateman, Hall and Edgerton's performances.

== Plot ==
Simon and Robyn Callem leave Chicago after Simon takes a job in his hometown, Los Angeles, where they plan to start having children. While at the mall, they unexpectedly run into Gordon "Gordo" Moseley, high school classmate of Simon.

Gordo repeatedly visits unannounced, bringing gifts. His presence makes Simon uncomfortable, though Robyn thinks it's harmless. Gordo invites them to a dinner party at his large home. When the Callems arrive, Gordo claims the other couple cancelled. Gordo receives an apparent urgent phone call and briefly leaves the house. After returning, Gordo, having previously told the couple he was unmarried, says the house belongs to his wife who left him, taking their two kids. Simon is suspicious and tells Gordo to stay away from him and Robyn before they abruptly leave.

The next day, Robyn discovers that the pond koi Gordo gave them are dead, and their dog is missing. Simon drives to Gordo's home but discovers that it is owned by another couple. Gordo worked for them as a driver. Simon learns that Gordo has never been married or had children.

Robyn begins suspecting someone is entering the house as she finds faucets left running and hears footsteps. Unable to sleep, she steals her neighbor's prescription pills to provide relief. That night, the dog returns, and a letter from Gordo is in the mail. The note ends by saying, "I was willing to let bygones be bygones, I had nothing but good intentions." Simon claims not to know its meaning.

Simon's only competition for a work promotion is coworker Danny McDonald. Meanwhile, Robyn suddenly faints at home. When she awakens in bed the next morning, Simon confronts her about the stolen pills, a problem she had in Chicago.

Things improve over time, and Robyn becomes pregnant. One day, she sees Gordo watching her while shopping. Simon's sister reveals to Robyn that in high school, Simon and his friend, Greg Pierson, claimed that Gordo had been molested by an older boy, leading to Gordo being bullied, accused of being gay, and transferring schools. Robyn also discovers that Simon has run background checks on both Danny McDonald and Gordo, who has been in and out of prison his adult life. She seeks out Greg, who reveals Simon fabricated the molestation story. As a result, Gordo's religious father tried to burn Gordo alive, believing he was gay. The father was arrested for attempted murder, and Gordo was sent to military school. When Robyn asks why Simon would do such a thing, Greg explains that Simon was a bully who did cruel things just because he could.

Robyn confronts Simon, who denies responsibility. At her behest, he offers Gordo a non-apology. Knowing Simon is insincere, Gordo warns that the past is not done with him yet. Furious, Simon attacks Gordo, though he lies to Robyn by implying that Gordo accepted his apology. Simon is promoted at work, but at his celebration party, Danny McDonald hurls a rock through the window; he accuses Simon of fabricating information and ruining his career for the promotion. Robyn suddenly goes into labor and gives birth.

Simon is fired for lying about McDonald, and Robyn wants to separate. He returns home to find three gift boxes, consisting of the Callems' house key, an audio recording of Simon mocking Gordo at the dinner party, and video from inside their home showing that Gordo drugged Robyn and stood over her, seemingly about to sexually assault her. Gordo wears a monkey mask (a lifelong fear for Simon) as he touches an unconscious Robyn on the bed before the camera cuts. At the same time, Gordo visits Robyn at the hospital with a bandaged eye and his arm in a sling. He says Simon caused his injuries. Simon rushes to the hospital but just misses Gordo. Later, Gordo calls Simon and tauntingly refuses to confirm or deny if he raped Robyn and fathered the baby, just as Simon had refused to admit the molestation story was false. Robyn, furious, refuses to allow Simon see their infant son. With his marriage and career destroyed, Simon breaks down as Gordo watches. Satisfied with his revenge, Gordo walks away, tossing away the arm sling.

== Cast ==
- Jason Bateman as Simon
- Rebecca Hall as Robyn
- Joel Edgerton as Gordo
- Tim Griffin as Kevin "KK" Keelor
- Allison Tolman as Lucy
- Katie Aselton as Joan
- Wendell Pierce as Detective Mills
- Beau Knapp as Detective Walker
- Adam Lazarre-White as Ron
- David Denman as Greg
- P. J. Byrne as Danny McDonald
- Busy Philipps as Duffy
- Felicity Price as Dr Angelo Derezio

Joel Edgerton's brother, Nash Edgerton, plays the part of Frank Dale, in addition to his duties as the film's stunt coordinator.

== Production ==
The project was announced in August 2012, with Joel Edgerton writing the screenplay and Edgerton set to make his directing debut. His inspirations for the screenplay included Alfred Hitchcock, Cape Fear, Fatal Attraction and Michael Haneke's 2005 French film Caché, as well as Park Chan-wook's Vengeance Trilogy.

Principal photography began on January 19, 2015, and ended on February 20, 2015. A majority of filming took place at a home in the Hollywood Hills neighborhood, where STX Entertainment also held promotional interviews for the film. The film was shot on an Arri Alexa with Canon K35 lenses, and was filmed in 25 days, according to its cinematographer, Eduard Grau. Grau was recommended by Nash Edgerton, who served as the film's stunt coordinator, after the two were part of the production for the 2013 short film Streetcar. In an interview with Collider, Edgerton revealed that he did not start filming his acting role until two weeks into shooting (devoting that time, instead, solely to directing). As soon as he did, his older brother Nash assisted on set behind the camera. Edgerton completed shooting his role as Gordo in seven days.

Post-production took eleven weeks from March to June 2015. Luke Doolan also edited Sundance winner Animal Kingdom (also starring Edgerton). On January 20, 2015, STX Entertainment bought the United States distribution rights to the film. STX retitled the film The Gift.

== Release ==
STX initially set The Gift for domestic release on July 31, 2015, and later moved it to August 7, 2015. The first trailer was released on April 1, 2015. It premiered on Twitter's live video streaming app Periscope, making STX Entertainment the first advertiser to work with Twitter on a campaign incorporating Periscope.

=== Home media ===
The film was released on DVD and Blu-ray on October 27, 2015.

== Reception ==
=== Box office ===
The Gift grossed $43.8 million in North America and $15.2 million in other territories for a worldwide total of $59 million, against a budget of $5 million.

In its opening weekend, the film grossed $11.9 million, finishing third at the box office behind Mission: Impossible – Rogue Nation ($28.5 million) and fellow newcomer Fantastic Four ($25.7 million).

=== Critical response ===
On review aggregator website Rotten Tomatoes, the film has a rating of 92%, based on 194 reviews, with an average rating of 7.50/10. The site's critical consensus reads, "The Gift is wickedly smart and playfully subversive, challenging the audience's expectations while leaving them leaning on the edges of their seats." Metacritic gives the film a score of 77 out of 100, based on 31 critics, indicating "generally favorable reviews". On CinemaScore, audiences gave the film an average grade of "B" on an A+ to F scale.

Time Out's Daisy Bowie-Sell praised The Gift as "darkly unnerving", commending its ending and comparing it positively to a similar film, The Hand That Rocks the Cradle. In a review for IndieWire, Katie Walsh lamented the film's use of common thriller cliches and restraint towards the climax, but lauded Joel Edgerton's direction, concluding: "His deft, controlled maneuvering of plot, character, style, and tone is damn near perfect for his feature debut—even if it is in service of a very standard genre piece."

Critics also praised Bateman, known for portraying the “straight man” in comedies, for playing against type as the mean-spirited Simon. RogerEbert.com’s Sheila O’Malley wrote that Bateman gives a “beautiful and focused performance” as someone who is “kindly and condescending, sometimes in the same moment”. Collider's Matt Goldberg commented that, while the film “almost goes too far in making [Simon] a sociopath”, Bateman's charisma worked for the character: “What makes Bateman inherently likable gives Simon a lot of his power, and it’s a memorable performance as we despise the character but also wonder if he deserves vicious comeuppance for what he did to Gordo.” Slate's Keith Phipps wrote that “Bateman plays Simon with the easy charm and everyman approachability of past roles,” but “pushes the charm into smarm and the approachability into sleaze.”

=== Accolades ===
Award	Category	Recipient(s)	Result	Ref(s)
Sitges Film Festival	Best Actor	Joel Edgerton	Won	
Fangoria Chainsaw Awards	Best Supporting Actor	Joel Edgerton	Won	
Fangoria Chainsaw Awards	Best Wide-Release Film	Joel Edgerton	Nominated	
Fangoria Chainsaw Awards	Best Screenplay	Joel Edgerton	Nominated	
Directors Guild of America Awards	First-Time Feature Film Director	Joel Edgerton	Nominated	
Central Ohio Film Critics Association	Breakthrough Film Artist (for producing, directing and screenwriting)	Joel Edgerton	Nominated	
Central Ohio Film Critics Association	Best Overlooked Film		Runner-up	
Empire Awards	Best Thriller		Nominated	
Saturn Awards	Best Thriller Film		Nominated	
