= Wish You Were Here (2012 film) =

2012 Australian mystery drama film

- Theatrical release poster
- Directed by: Kieran Darcy-Smith
- Written by: Kieran Darcy-Smith; Felicity Price
- Produced by: Angie Fielder
- Starring: Felicity Price; Joel Edgerton; Teresa Palmer; Antony Starr
- Cinematography: Jules O'Loughlin
- Edited by: Jason Ballantine
- Music by: Rosie Chase
- Production companies: Level K Blue-Tongue Films; Aquarius Films; Screen Australia
- Distributed by: Hopscotch Films
- Release date: 26 April 2012
- Running time: 89 minutes
- Country: Australia
- Language: English
- Box office: $1.5 million

Wish You Were Here is a 2012 Australian mystery drama film directed by Kieran Darcy-Smith and starring Felicity Price, Joel Edgerton, Teresa Palmer, and Antony Starr. Set in Cambodia and Australia, it details the aftermath of a Southeast Asian holiday gone awry for two couples.

== Plot ==
Dave Flannery reluctantly vacations in Cambodia with his pregnant wife Alice, her younger sister Steph and new boyfriend Jeremy. After a night of partying, Jeremy vanishes without a trace. Dave and the women return to their lives, each bearing differing degrees of knowledge about what happened and slowly put the pieces of the puzzle together to find out what happened that night.

Dave reveals he slept with Steph on the beach. He went back to the hotel, but Alice was asleep. He goes for a walk and meets a man, who offers to take him to a small bar. Dave went and began drinking. The customers at the bar began harassing him and tried to get him to take a prostitute, but he declined. He gets angry and throws all his money at them. He tells them he doesn't want the prostitute, but will pay for her. The men drag an 8-year-old girl from the backroom. Horrified, Dave begins screaming at them. Jeremy comes out of a backroom and apologises for Dave, trying to calm the men down. The men lure Jeremy and Dave outside. Dave threatens to call the police on the men for child prostitution, but Jeremy tells Dave the men are the Vietnamese mafia. In a fight, Jeremy is stabbed to death. Dave is restrained and the men find his address. They say that if he tells anyone, they will go to his house and kill his family.

In the present, Alice gets into an argument with Dave. She goes to Steph's house and confronts her. On the way home, she gets into a car accident and is rushed to the hospital, where she prematurely gives birth to the baby. In the end, Dave tells the police the truth of Jeremy's death.

== Cast ==
- Joel Edgerton as Dave Flannery
- Teresa Palmer as Steph McKinney
- Felicity Price as Alice Flannery
- Antony Starr as Jeremy King

== Reception ==
On the review aggregator website Rotten Tomatoes, 72% of 67 critics' reviews are positive, with an average rating of 6.4/10. The website's consensus reads: "Smart, slick, and thrilling, Wish You Were Here benefits from a compelling mystery at the center of its tightly wound plot, as well as strong performances from a cast that includes Joel Edgerton."

=== Awards and nominations ===
Award	Category	Subject	Result
AACTA Award (2nd)	Best Film	Angie Fielder	Nominated
AACTA Award (2nd)	Best Direction	Kieran Darcy-Smith	Nominated
AACTA Award (2nd)	Best Original Screenplay	Kieran Darcy-Smith	Won
AACTA Award (2nd)	Best Original Screenplay	Felicity Price	Won
AACTA Award (2nd)	Best Actress	Felicity Price	Nominated
AACTA Award (2nd)	Best Actor	Joel Edgerton	Nominated
AACTA Award (2nd)	Best Supporting Actor	Antony Starr	Won
AACTA Award (2nd)	Best Cinematography	Jules O'Loughlin	Nominated
AACTA Award (2nd)	Best Editing	Jason Ballantine	Nominated
ACS Award	NSW & ACT Gold Award	Jules O'Loughlin	Won
ADG Award	Best Direction in a Feature Film	Kieran Darcy-Smith	Nominated
ASE Award	Best Editing on a Feature Film	Jason Ballantine	Nominated
ASSG Award	Best Film Sound Design		Won
ASSG Award	Best Film Sound Mixing		Won
AWGIE Award	Best Original Writing	Kieran Darcy-Smith	Nominated
AWGIE Award	Best Original Writing	Felicity Price	Nominated
FCCA Awards	Best Film	Angie Fielder	Won
FCCA Awards	Best Director	Kieran Darcy-Smith	Nominated
FCCA Awards	Best Screenplay	Kieran Darcy-Smith	Won
FCCA Awards	Best Screenplay	Felicity Price	Won
FCCA Awards	Best Actress	Felicity Price	Nominated
FCCA Awards	Best Actor	Joel Edgerton	Won
FCCA Awards	Best Supporting Actor	Antony Starr	Won
FCCA Awards	Best Supporting Actress	Teresa Palmer	Nominated
FCCA Awards	Best Cinematography	Jules O'Loughlin	Nominated
FCCA Awards	Best Editing	Jason Ballantine	Won
Sundance Film Festival	Grand Jury Prize	Kieran Darcy-Smith	Nominated
