= Daniel Krige =

Australian film director (born 1970)

- Born: 16 July 1970 (age 56); Cape Town, South Africa
- Occupations: Writer, director, actor

Daniel Krige (born 16 July 1970) is a writer, director and actor.

== Early life ==
Born in Cape Town, South Africa, he grew up in Australia. Krige began working as a writer at the age of sixteen for Grundy Television.

Krige attended the Australian Film Television and Radio School with Dion Beebe, Rowan Woods, Samantha Lang, Peter Duncan, and Robert Connolly.

== Career ==
Krige began to direct and act at the age of 21. While at the Australian Film, TV and radio school (AFTRS) as a writing student, he wrote the screenplay for the film The Door (1992), from a story by fellow student Josie Keys, who directed the film. It received the Golden Hugo for Best Student Drama at the Chicago International Film Festival in 1993.

He continued his early successes by writing and directing (and even starring in some of) the short films, Our Feral Friends (1994), Fuckwit (1994), and Happily Ever After (1996). John Polson, director of the Tropfest Film Festival, was third assistant director on Krige's short film Fuckwit.

His film Happily Ever After (1996) came second at Australia's Tropfest Film Festival.

In 2007, Krige directed his debut feature film entitled West. The Age called the film a "surprisingly effective plot-driven atmosphere piece." Johnette Napolitano of Concrete Blonde fame is the main vocalist on the score to West. She also sings the title song, "Falling in Love".

== Filmography ==
=== Actor ===
- Our Feral Friends (short, 1994) as Mark Flannel
- Fuckwit (short, 1994) as Joshua
- Happily Ever After (short, 1996) aa Ray
- Twisted Tales as Judy's brother
- Cactus (2008) as Mal
- Wonderland (2014, season 2) as Alex

=== Writer/director ===
- The Door (1992) – writer (student film)
- Our Feral Friends (short, 1994) – writer/director
- Fuckwit (short, 1994) – writer
- Happily Ever After (short, 1996) – writer
- Sweat – episode 18 (1996) – writer
- Mirror, Mirror II – ep 19: "Herons", ep 20: "The Shipwreck" (1997) – writer
- Murder Call – season 1 ep 11: "Dead and Gone" (1999) – writer
- Murder Call – season 3, ep 10: "Boomerang Business" (1999) – writer
- West (2007) – writer/director
- Providence Park (short, 2010) – director
- Pathways (video, 2010) – director
- Redd Inc (2012) – director
- The Agent – 5 episodes (2016) – director
- Larry Time (short, 2019) – director
