= The Duel (2016 film) =

2016 film by Kieran Darcy-Smith

- Theatrical release poster
- Directed by: Kieran Darcy-Smith
- Written by: Matt Cook
- Produced by: David Hoberman; Todd Lieberman; Adam Rosenfelt; Maureen Meulen
- Starring: Woody Harrelson; Liam Hemsworth; Alice Braga; Emory Cohen; Felicity Price; José Zúñiga; William Sadler
- Cinematography: Jules O'Loughlin
- Edited by: Tracy Adams; Blake Hjares
- Music by: Craig Eastman
- Production companies: Atomic Entertainment; Mandeville Films; Mississippix Studios; 26 Films; Bron Capital Partners; Crystal Wealth
- Distributed by: Lionsgate Premiere
- Release date: June 24, 2016 (United States)
- Running time: 110 minutes
- Country: United States
- Language: English

The Duel is a 2016 American Western film directed by Kieran Darcy-Smith and written by Matt Cook. The film stars Liam Hemsworth, Emory Cohen, Woody Harrelson, and Alice Braga. The film was released for limited release and video on demand on June 24, 2016, by Lionsgate Premiere. It was released on DVD and Blu-Ray on August 23, 2016.

== Plot ==
On the Texas border, in 1887, Texas Ranger David Kingston is sent by Governor “Sul” Ross to the isolated town of Mount Hermon. Kingston is to investigate a series of murders and disappearances of Mexican citizens, in particular to search for Maria Calderon, the missing niece of a Mexican general who is threatening to invade to find her. In the town, preacher and mayor Abraham Brant – the man who killed Kingston's father in a ”Helena Duel” knife fight in 1866 – is keeping all the townsfolk in some kind of fearful grip. When Kingston arrives in town, the townsfolk act cold and hostile towards him, with the exception of Brant, who is smitten by Kingston's wife, Marisol.

Kingston hides his identity and purpose from Brant, appearing as a wandering traveler. Brant offers him the role of town sheriff, which the newcomer hesitantly accepts, hoping the position will cover him long enough to carry out his real investigation.

While Kingston explores the town and investigates the nearby Rio Grande for bodies, Brant manipulates a weak-spirited Marisol into becoming dependent on him. An abused prostitute named Naomi offers information to Kingston in exchange for getting her out of her troublesome life, but Brant and his men get their revenge by hanging her. Kingston learns Brant's secret - that he is abducting Mexicans to serve as prey for rich foreigners to hunt.

When Kingston confronts Brant and the townspeople, Brant's son Isaac challenges Kingston to a ”Helena Duel” knife fight. During the fight, Kingston is badly wounded before he kills Isaac. Kingston escapes, and frees a number of captured Mexicans from the remote prison compound, including Maria Calderon. Suffering from his knife wounds, Kingston hits Brant in a shootout while near the isolated compound, then pins Brant's leg under a boulder. When Kingston passes out, Brant cuts his own leg off and crawls to the wounded man. As he is about to cut Kingston's throat, Maria reappears and shoots Brant dead.

Kingston dumps Brant's body in the Rio Grande near a dead scalped Mexican woman. The Mexican general is grateful to Kingston for getting Maria back. When men go back to the town and the prison, they find the town abandoned and no sign of the prison at all. Kingston is last seen riding off into the brush alone, staring up at the tree where Naomi was hung earlier by Brant.

== Cast ==
- Woody Harrelson as Abraham Brant
- Liam Hemsworth as David Kingston
- Alice Braga as Marisol Kingston
- Emory Cohen as Isaac Brant
- Felicity Price as Naomi
- William Sadler as Governor Lawrence Sullivan "Sul" Ross
- Christopher James Baker as Monte
- Christopher Berry as Dale
- Benedict Samuel as George
- Giles Matthey as John
- Raphael Sbarge as Dr. Morris
- Jason Carter as William
- David Born as Hoot
- Kimberly Hidalgo as Maria Calderon
- John McConnell as Saul
- José Zúñiga as General Calderon

== Production ==
On September 28, 2012, Kieran Darcy-Smith was set to direct the Helena, Texas set Western film (only briefly “appears” in the final film, set instead in the fictional Mount Hermon) based on Matt Cook's 2009 Black Listed script, which David Hoberman and Todd Lieberman were announced to produce for their Mandeville Films.

During 2014, a number of actors were attached to the film. On July 1, it was announced that Liam Hemsworth and Woody Harrelson would be starring in the lead roles of David Kingston and Abraham Brant, with the film then titled By Way of Helena. On August 29, Felicity Price was added to the cast. On September 5, William Hurt and Alice Braga joined the cast, and WestEnd Films was attached as handling international sales. (While Hurt was still reported as being in the film as late as an April 2016 article when the trailer was released online, and a June 2016 review showing him as playing Governor Ross, he does not actually appear – nor is he credited – in the final release.) Adam Rosenfelt and Maureen Meulen would finance the film and co-produce through their Atomic Entertainment. On October 2, Emory Cohen was added to the film to play Isaac. On October 9, Benedict Samuel joined the film to play Brit (renamed George in the final film, a British character) who visits the town with his father and brother to participate in the preacher's notorious manhunts.

Nicholas Hoult, Joel Edgerton and Jamie Bell were once attached to star in the film in 2013.

=== Filming ===
The filming began on September 15, 2014, in Greenwood, Mississippi. The shooting mostly took place at the former Florewood State Park, which was transformed into an Old West frontier town.

== Critical response ==
On review aggregator website Rotten Tomatoes, The Duel has an approval rating of 32%, based on 19 reviews, with a weighted average score of 5.17/10. On Metacritic, the film has a score of 42 out of 100, based on 9 critics, indicating "mixed or average reviews".
