= Kieran Darcy-Smith =

Australian actor and director

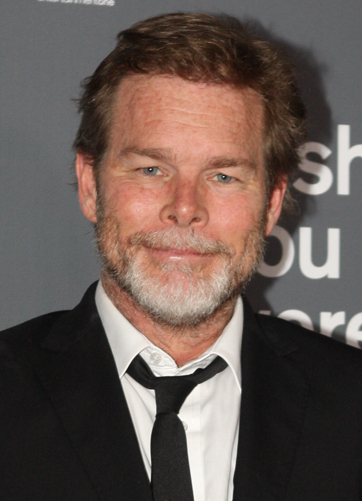
- Born: Mona Vale, Sydney, New South Wales
- Education: Killarney Heights High School; University of Western Sydney
- Occupations: Actor, director, writer
- Years active: 1996–present
- Spouse: Felicity Price (m. 7 January 2006)
- Children: 2

Kieran Darcy-Smith is an Australian actor, film director, and screenwriter.

== Early life and education ==
Kieran Darcy-Smith was born to a pharmacist father who worked in the Sydney suburb of Frenchs Forest and a stay-at-home mother, and was one of five siblings. He attended Killarney Heights High School, leaving school at the age of 15 to work at a bookshop in Manly, where he became an avid reader.

By the age of 18, Darcy-Smith was living in a long-term de-facto relationship in North Avalon. He later formed the rock band Feast of Friends with an old schoolfriend, in which he was a singer-guitarist. The band released a single and toured with Transvision Vamp in the 1980s.

When Darcy-Smith was 25, he decided to try a part-time acting class. Following this, he auditioned for drama schools and ultimately spent three years studying theatre at the University of Western Sydney, meeting Joel Edgerton on his first day there. He was 30 when he graduated.

== Career ==
At the age of 31, after graduating from university, Darcy-Smith formed the film collective, Blue-Tongue Films with Joel Edgerton and his stuntman brother, Nash, to make the short film Loaded in 1996. He also began working regularly on film and TV sets as an actor.

Early television roles included Water Rats, All Saints, Wildside and My Place, and he also appeared in the 1999 crime comedy film Two Hands, alongside Heath Ledger, Rose Byrne and Bryan Brown. Initially, Darcy-Smith played thugs and villainous characters, before scoring a role in 2005 American studio film The Cave.

As his acting career progressed, Darcy-Smith realised his passion lay in filmmaking. Blue-Tongue Films made 2008 film The Square, short film Miracle Fish (2009) and David Michôd's 2010 award-winning Animal Kingdom. He also had roles in all three films.

Darcy-Smith had roles in the films September (2007) and The Reef (2010). Blue-Tongue Films made 2010 American comedy drama Hesher, 2012 war film Memorial Day (which won the 2008 IF Award for Best Unproduced Screenplay) and 2015 Michod's western film The Rover, starring Guy Pearce and Robert Pattinson.

In 2012, at the age of 45, Darcy-Smith made his feature film writing and directing debut with mystery drama Wish You Were Here, starring Joel Edgerton and Teresa Palmer, which he co-wrote with his wife Felicity Price, who also had a lead role in the film. After screening at the Sundance Film Festival, the film was so well-received, that it immediately sold for US release and was nominated for Best Film and Best Director at the AACTA Awards in 2013.

Darcy-Smith's second directorial project, 2016 western feature The Duel, starred Liam Hemsworth, Woody Harrelson, Emory Cohen, William Hurt, and Alice Braga. The film had a limited release and through video on demand on 24 June 2016, by Lionsgate Premiere.

Filmed during the COVID-19 pandemic, Darcy-Smith served as a writer and director on the 2023 series Last King of the Cross, telling the story of real life crime figure, John Ibrahim, played by Lincoln Younes. The series also starred English actor Tim Roth.

Kieran’s other television directing credits include the first season of Jack Irish, two episodes of Wolf Creek and three episodes of Reef Break. He has also collaborated on music videos and photo shoots with Powderfinger, Ben Lee, Alex Lloyd, Kasey Chambers, Paul Kelly, You Am I, Amiel, Shane Nicholson and Troy Cassar-Daley.

Darcy-Smith was curator and producer of the Homebake Festival's short film program, having been involved in the festival since 2001.

In 2025 he plays the estranged father of a transgender man in Harvey Zielinski's feature directorial debut, Sweet Milk Lake.

== Awards ==
Year	Work	Award	Category	Result	Ref.
1995	Little Sky Cambodia	Australian Writers' Guild and NSW Film & Television Office	Mentorship Scheme Award	Won	
2008	Memorial Day	IF Award	Best Unproduced Screenplay	Won	
2012	Wish You Were Here	Sundance Film Festival	Grand Jury Prize	Nominated	
2013	Wish You Were Here	AACTA Awards	Best Original Screenplay Award	Nominated	
2013	Wish You Were Here	AACTA Awards	Best Film	Nominated	
2013	Wish You Were Here	AACTA Awards	Best Director	Nominated	
2013	Wish You Were Here	Australian Film Critics Circle Awards	Best Film	Won	
2013	Wish You Were Here	Australian Film Critics Circle Awards	Best Screenplay	Won	

== Personal life ==
Darcy-Smith first met his wife, actress Felicity Price, at the opening of Sydney's Fox Studios. They were initially just friends, after which time Price relocated overseas for a few years and the pair lost touch. On her return to Australia, the pair resumed their friendship, which eventually turned romantic and they were married on 7 January 2006. Actor Joel Edgerton was best man at their wedding and is the godfather of one of their two children.

They couple relocated to Los Angeles in 2012, shortly after their film Wish You Were Here was released, and while their children were still young.

== Filmography ==
=== Film ===
==== Writer / Director ====
Year	Title	Role	Notes
1996	Loaded	Writer / Producer / Composer	Short film
1998	Bloodlock	Writer / Producer / Composer / Production Coordinator	Short film
2000	The Island	Writer / Co-producer	Short film
2002	Texas	Additional Cinematographer	Documentary film
2006	Kokoda: 39th Battalion	Script Editor	Feature film
2008	I Love Sarah Jane	Production Stills	Short film
2008	The Square	Additional Stills	Feature film
2008	Netherland Dwarf	Still Photographer	Short film
2009	Daybreakers	ADR Loop Group	Feature film
2010	Tomorrow, When the War Began	Loop Group Performer	Feature film
2012	Wish You Were Here	Writer / Director	Feature film
2016	The Duel	Director	Feature film
2021	Our Father	Executive Producer	Short film
TBA	Power & Way	Director	In development
TBA	Blackwater	Director	In development
TBA	Fever	Director / Writer	Pre-production
TBA	Treat	Writer	In development
TBA	Out of Mind	Producer	In development

==== Actor ====
Year	Title	Role	Notes
1996	Daydream Believer	Stagehand (uncredited)	Feature film
1996	Loaded	Paddy	Short film
1996	Jac et Bill	Jac	Short film
1998	Bloodlock	Scott Robertson	Short film
1999	Two Hands	Craig	Feature film
2000	The Island	The Man	Short film
2001	The Pitch	Chainsaw Maniac	Short film
2005	The Cave	Strode	Feature film
2006	Pacific	Man	Short film
2007	Katoomba	Brian	Short film
2007	September	Rick	Feature film
2008	The Square	Barney	Feature film
2008	The List	Nick	Short film
2009	Miracle Fish	Peter Unwin / TRG Negotiator	Short film
2010	Animal Kingdom	John Harrop	Feature film
2010	The Reef	Warren	Feature film
2010	Grey Scale	Michael	Short film
2012	Cryo	The Captain	Short film
2012	Spirit-ED	Mr Jones	Short film
2021	Shark	Captain Rick	Short film
2024	How to Make Gravy	Red	Feature film
2024	Make It Look Real	Himself	Documentary film
2026	Sweet Milk Lake	Lee	Feature film

=== Television ===
==== Writer / Director ====
Year	Title	Role	Notes
2016	Jack Irish	Director	2 episodes
2017	Wolf Creek	Director	2 episodes: "Chase", "Singing"
2019	Reef Break	Director	3 episodes
2023	Last King of the Cross	Director	4 episodes (co-directed 2 episodes with Grant Brown)
2023	Last King of the Cross	Writer	3 episodes
2023	Last King of the Cross	Script Producer	10 episodes

==== Actor ====
Year	Title	Role	Notes
1996	Police Rescue	Col	Season 5, episode 1: "The Ultimate"
1997	Fallen Angels	Hoon	Season 1, episode 10: "Bury My Heart in Endeavour Park"
1997	Murder Call	Felix Kiver	Season 1, episode 3: "Cat & Mouse"
1997–2001	Water Rats	Stewart Renshaw / Craig Castle / Xavier Tully / Des	4 episodes
1999	Big Sky	Cooly	2 episodes
1999	Wildside	George Renner	Season 2, episode 11
1999	Blue Heelers	Travis Watson	Season 6, episode 36: "Second Chance"
1999	Breakers	Slim	4 episodes
1999–2008	All Saints	Dave Hegarty / Mathew King / Gordie Hallam / Dave Barclay	4 episodes
2001	Going Home	Stalker	7 episodes
2001; 2009	Home and Away	Tim Coleman / Terry	9 episodes
2002	Young Lions	Marty Charlton	2 episodes
2002	Always Greener	Trevor Southall	Season 2, episode 9: "Understanding the Cry"
2003	White Collar Blue	Neil Jeffries	Season 2, episode 20
2003	McLeod's Daughters	Lindsay Stubbs	Season 6, episode 10: "The Big Commitment"
2006	Stupid, Stupid Man	Jack Hanson	Season 1, episode 7: "The Mole"
2007	Dangerous	Garry	Miniseries, 6 episodes
2008	Infamous Victory: Ben Chifley's Battle for Coal	Don Rogers	TV movie
2009	My Place	Pa	3 episodes
2011	Rescue: Special Ops	Detective Brendan Lockyer	Season 3, episode 17: "Art Attack"
2019	Mr Inbetween	Vinnie Williams	Season 2, 4 episodes
2025	Apple Cider Vinegar	Andrew Dal-Bello	Miniseries, episode 2: "Clean Sheets"

=== Music videos ===
==== Director / Producer ====
Year	Artist	Title	Role
2003	You Am I	Deliverance	Director / Producer
2003	You Am I	The Cream & the Crock	Director / Producer / Additional Cinematographer
2010	Powderfinger	Sunsets: Powderfinger Farewell Tour Live in Concert	Camera Operator

==== Actor ====
Year	Artist	Title	Role
2002	Eskimo Joe	Liar	Actor
