= Another Happy Day =

2011 American black comedy-drama film

- Theatrical release poster
- Directed by: Sam Levinson
- Written by: Sam Levinson
- Produced by: Ellen Barkin; Celine Rattray; Todd Traina; Johnny Lin; Michael Nardelli; Salli Newman; Pamela Fiedler
- Starring: Ellen Barkin; Kate Bosworth; Ellen Burstyn; Thomas Haden Church; Jeffrey DeMunn; Siobhan Fallon Hogan; George Kennedy; Ezra Miller; Demi Moore; Diana Scarwid; Daniel Yelsky
- Cinematography: Ivan Strasburg
- Edited by: Ray Hubley
- Music by: Ólafur Arnalds
- Production companies: Mandalay Vision; Taggart Productions; Cineric; Fimula Entertainment; New Mexico Media Partners; Prop Blast Films
- Distributed by: Phase 4 Films
- Release dates: January 23, 2011 (Sundance); November 18, 2011 (United States)
- Running time: 119 minutes
- Country: United States
- Language: English
- Box office: $659,937

Another Happy Day is a 2011 American drama film written and directed by Sam Levinson, in his feature directorial debut. The film stars an ensemble cast including Ellen Barkin, Kate Bosworth, Ellen Burstyn, Thomas Haden Church, Jeffrey DeMunn, Siobhan Fallon Hogan, George Kennedy, Ezra Miller, Demi Moore, Diana Scarwid and Daniel Yelsky.

It had its world premiere at the Sundance Film Festival on January 23, 2011. It was released on November 18, 2011, by Phase 4 Films.

== Plot ==
Lynn attends her estranged son’s wedding in an attempt to reconnect with him after years of separation. Her arrival creates tension within the family and brings unresolved conflicts to the surface. As the event unfolds, long-standing grievances and hidden truths are revealed, forcing those involved to confront their relationships and past decisions.

== Cast ==
- Ellen Barkin as Lynn Hellman
- Kate Bosworth as Alice Hellman
- Ellen Burstyn as Doris Baker
- Thomas Haden Church as Paul
- George Kennedy as Joe Baker
- Ezra Miller as Elliot Hellman
- Demi Moore as Patty
- Siobhan Fallon Hogan as Bonnie
- Michael Nardelli as Dylan
- Daniel Yelsky as Ben Hellman, Lynn's autistic (Asperger's) son
- Eamon O'Rourke as Brandon
- Lola Kirke as Charlie
- Jeffrey DeMunn as Lee
- Diana Scarwid as Donna
- Pepper as Pinkybones the dog

== Release ==
Another Happy Day was screened at the 27th Sundance Film Festival on January 23, 2011. The film also screened at South by Southwest on March 18, 2011; at the Woodstock Film Festival on September 23; at the Mill Valley Film Festival on October 12; and was given a limited release on November 18.

== Critical reception ==
Another Happy Day holds 47% approval rating on review aggregator website Rotten Tomatoes, based on 34 reviews, with an average of 5.2/10. The site's critical consensus reads: "Another Happy Day features outstanding performances (Ellen Barkin's especially) but the characters are too unpleasant to endure." On Metacritic, the film holds a rating of 46 out of 100, based on 18 critics, indicating "mixed or average" reviews.

Barkin received critical acclaim for her performance, with Gabe Toro of IndieWire writing that it was one of the best female performances of the year. Chris Bumbray of JoBlo wrote: "A searing look at the modern family dynamic, and the way love and hate can be inter-changeable at times. Ellen Barkin is Oscar worthy".

John DeFore of The Hollywood Reporter gave the film a positive review, writing: "Laugh-laced dark drama of family angst overcomes the hurdle of its wedding-weekend setting." Leah Rozen of TheWrap also gave the film a positive review, writing: "Altmanesque in its sprawl and sympathetic attitude toward even its most flawed characters, Happy Day marks a mostly promising debut for director-writer Sam Levinson."

Stephen Holden of The New York Times gave the film a negative review writing: "Both anguished and histrionic and in its strongest moments very, very good. But it is also overpopulated, strident and constitutionally unable to step back and scrutinize itself." Moira McDonald of The Seattle Times also gave the film a negative review writing: "Another Happy Day becomes increasingly difficult to watch, despite its intelligence and strong cast. You wish this family well, but you're grateful to see the last of them."
