= Travis McMahon =

Australian actor

- Occupation: Actor
- Years active: 1997–present

Travis McMahon is an Australian actor. For his performance in Stingers he was nominated for the 2001 Australian Film Institute Award for Best Performance by an Actor in a Guest Role in a Television Drama Series.

After graduating from NIDA McMahon began his career in the stage play Kid Stakes for the Melbourne Theatre Company. A regular role on TV's Good Guys, Bad Guys followed, playing Reuben Zeus, a drycleaner with Tourette syndrome. He has toured internationally with Cloudstreet and played a main role in Last Man Standing. He played a soldier Darko Moey in Kokoda and the lead character in Cactus. In 2012 he played in stage play Summer of the Seventeenth Doll, a sequel to Kid Stakes and appeared as a regular in Miss Fisher's Murder Mysteries.

In 2024, McMahon appeared in Foxtel/Binge series High Country.

== Filmography ==
=== Film ===
Year	Title	Role	Type
1998	Mrs Craddock's Complaint	Constable Fletcher	Short
2004	Dope	Jack	
2004	It Takes Two to Tango	Seb	Short
2006	Kokoda	Darko Moey	Feature film
2006	Human Lie Detector	Car Salesman	
2008	Cactus	John Kelly	Feature film
2009	Birthday	Father Philip	
2010	I Love You Too	Owen	Feature film
2010	Roadman	Max Grief	
2011	Hobby Farm	Louie	
2011	Swerve	Charlie	
2014	Groomless Bride	Andrew Walker	
2014	Fractions	Shrink	Short
2015	AirGirl	Charles Kingsford Smith	Short
2018	The Goth	Mason	Short
2020	Miss Fisher and the Crypt of Tears	Bert Johnson	Feature Film
2020	Rams	Fergo	
2020	How Do You Know Chris?	Mike	
2023	Foe	Lunch Room Co-Worker	
2024	Myall Creek Day of Justice	John Plunkett	

=== Television ===
Year	Title	Role	Type
1997	Halifax f.p.	Matthew	1 episode
1997	Good Guys, Bad Guys Only the Young Die Good	Reuben Zeus	TV movie
1997-98	Good Guys, Bad Guys	Reuben Zeus	TV series
1999	Blue Heelers	Troy	1 episode
2000	All Saints	Scott	1 episode
2001	Stingers	Jonah Day	TV series (including Season 4, Episode 2: Rich Man's World)
2001	Changi	Steve	
2003	Fat Cow Motel	Gavin	1 episode
2004	Through My Eyes	Frank Morris	TV miniseries
2005	Last Man Standing	Bruno Palmer	22 episodes
2006	City Homicide		1 episode
2009	Rush	Jerry	1 episode
2012	Howzat! Kerry Packer's War	Paul Hogan	TV miniseries
2012-15	Miss Fisher's Murder Mysteries	Bert Johnson	29 episodes
2020	Informer 3838	Mr L	2 episodes
2021	Harrow (TV series)	Terry Penn	1 episode
2023	Ten Pound Poms	Jonah Day	5 episodes
2024	High Country	Ghille Jack	1 episode
