= My Place (TV series) =

Australian children's television drama series

- Intertitle screenshot
- Genre: Children's drama
- Directed by: Catriona McKenzie, Michael James Rowland, Jessica Hobbs, Samantha Lang, Shawn Seet
- Starring: Susie Porter; Dan Wyllie; Sacha Horler
- Country of origin: Australia
- No. of seasons: 2
- No. of episodes: 26 (list of episodes)

Production
- Camera setup: single-camera
- Running time: 30 minutes
- Production company: Matchbox Pictures

Original release
- Network: ABC3
- Release: 4 December 2009 – 18 September 2011

My Place is an Australian children's television drama series based on the award-winning picture book of the same name by Nadia Wheatley and Donna Rawlins. The series first screened on ABC3 on weeknights at 8pm from 4 December 2009 and aired in the United States on Vibrant TV Network.

My Place is produced by Penny Chapman and directed by Jessica Hobbs, Samantha Lang, Catriona McKenzie, Michael James Rowland and Shawn Seet. The series was accompanied by an interactive website for children that allowed them to explore the house that is the series' main setting. It won the 2010 Logie Award for Best Children's Program.

On 23 March 2010 Screen Australia announced they approved funding for a second series which would focus on the lives of children and their families from the time period of 1878 to before the White Settlement. The first of thirteen episodes aired on 26 June 2011.

== Synopsis ==
My Place tells the story of one house in South Sydney as told by the generations of children who have lived there over a period of over 220 years. The series opens in 2008 and travels back to pre-1788. Each episode centres around a child with a talent for some kind of trouble, each hiding up the same old fig tree, each with a story to tell.

== Cast ==
=== Children ===
- Alfred Carslake as Colum (1938)
- Anastasia Feneri as Sofia (1968)
- Benson Anthony as Rowley (1898)
- Brenna Harding as Kath
- Charlie-Rose MacLennan as Minna Muller (1868)
- Charlotte McSweeney as Maryanne
- Darcy McGrath as Bunda (Before Time)
- Eliza Saville as Victoria (1888)
- Emma Jefferson as Johanna (1848)
- Holly Fraser as Bridie (1928)
- Jared Ziegler as Dan (1788)
- Jonathan Kollias as Michaelis (1958)
- Joseph Ireland as Davey Jonesy (1838)
- Kate Harding as Sarah (1808)
- Leonie Whyman as Waruwi (1788)
- Lucy Howroyd as Evelyn (1908)
- Maddie Madden as Laura (2008)
- Monique Holmes as Jen (1948)
- Narek Arman as Mohammed (1998)
- Nicholas Bakopoulos-Cooke as John Owen
- Sam Cotton as Sam (1798)
- Sam Fraser as Tom Muller
- Sam Parsonson as Jeff
- Shardyn Fahey-Leigh as Bertie (1918)
- Sheena Pham as Lily (1988)
- Wadih Dona as Omar
- Will Cottle as Mike (1978)
- Thomasina George as Alice (1828)

=== Adults ===
- Alex Blias as Baba
- Alexandra Schepisi as Adult Sarah / Granny Sarah
- Amanda Bishop as Janice
- Andrew Bibby as Mr McGrath
- Anita Hegh as Emma
- Arky Michael as Mr Kyrios Josephides
- Ben Oxenbould as Mr Owen
- Ben Winspear as Michaelis
- Celia Ireland as Bank's Maid
- Chris Haywood as Mr O'Sullivan / Momo
- Christopher James Baker as Tippy
- Dan Spielman as Irish Tradesman
- Dan Wyllie as Victoria's Father
- Deborah Galanos as Yaya
- Emma Lung as Adult Bridie
- Erol Cimen as Tyler Cromm
- Ewen Leslie as Mr Bracey
- Felicity Price as Mrs Thomson
- Harry Cook as Adult Tom Muller
- Hayley McElhinney as Victoria's mother
- Jack Tompsett as Adult Sam
- Kate Bell as Adult Alice
- Kate Box as Adult Kath
- Kate Mulvany as Mrs Owen
- Kiah Ferguson as Lorraine (Ellen's daughter)
- Kieran Darcy-Smith as Grandfather
- Kris McQuade as Auntie Bev's friend / Grandma
- Laurence Breuls as Jack
- Leah Purcell as Ellen
- Leon Ford as Vernon
- Louisa Mignone as Adult Sophia
- Maeve Dermody as Adult Evelyn
- Maria Tran as Thi Mai
- Matilda Brown as Adult Maryanne
- Nicholas Papademetriou as Adult Michaelis
- Odessa Young as Alexandra Owen
- Rebecca Massey as Mrs Benson
- Rhonda Doyle as Housewife
- Russell Dykstra as Mr Merry
- Ryan Johnson as PC Moroney
- Sacha Horler as Elsie
- Sarah Snook as Adult Minna Muller
- Stephen Anderton as Adult John Owen
- Susie Porter as Miss Muller
- Tom Fisher as Dom Cobb
- Trevor Jamieson as Father
- Victoria Haralabidou as Mama / Yaya
- Wayne Pygram as Bill Bayliss

== Episode list ==
=== Season One ===
- Laura 2008
- Mohammed 1998
- Lily 1988
- Mike 1978
- Sofia 1968
- Michaelis 1958
- Jen 1948
- Colum 1938
- Bridie 1928
- Bertie 1918
- Evelyn 1908
- Rowley 1898
- Victoria 1888

=== Season Two ===
- Henry 1878
- Minna 1868
- Ben 1858
- Johanna 1848
- Davey 1838
- Alice 1828
- Charles 1818
- Sarah 1808
- Sam 1798
- Dan 1788
- Waruwi 1788
- Bunda Before Time
- Barangaroo Before Time
