= Johnny Lin =

American film producer

- Occupation: Film producer
- Years active: 2009-present
- Organization(s): Filmula Entertainment, Filmula International

Johnny Lin is an American film producer. He is the principal of Filmula Entertainment and president of licensor Filmula International.

== Life and career ==
Lin began his career working for his father Jimmy Lin, a producer on Jet Li's breakout film The Legend and owner of Royal Country Golf Club, who came to the U.S. in 1979 and started his own video distribution business. He was a member of his father's prolific distribution team, which distributed over 800 films in Taiwan, Hong Kong and China. During this time, Lin and his father distributed successful films such as The Lord of the Rings, Rush Hour, The Wedding Singer, Wag the Dog, Spawn, and Runaway Bride. After growing up in New Zealand, Lin moved to the U.S.

Lin has been a producer and executive producer on numerous feature films including the crime thriller American Made with Tom Cruise, the black comedy Bernie with Jack Black and Matthew McConaughey, the drama Another Happy Day, and the 2010 Hesher. He also wrote, directed and produced the 2016 independent film Queen of Hearts. He heads Filmula, has provided over $800 million in film funding, and has acquired the rights to many films including Hunger Games, Magic Mike and The King's Speech, and exclusive rights to distribution of Miramax films and TV shows in Taiwan. He has been CEO of Studio Solutions since 2005. Studio Solutions Group has acquired 1,200 films including the Miramax library. In 2010 Filmula partnered with FilmNation signing a co-production deal. In 2012, Studio Solutions became embroiled in a dispute with CatchPlay over 925 film rights and whether Studio Solutions and CatchPlay had an agency relationship; in 2014, a dispute with Media Development Corp was awarded in Studio Solutions' favor.

In 2012 Lin entered into a joint development venture with Ted Field and Stan Lee, The Guardian Project, to produce multi-media content in association with the National Hockey League, and also invested in the failed reboot of Trauma Records; he twice successfully sued Field's company for breach-of-contract and recovery of the investment. On December 1, 2016 a federal judge ordered Ted Field and his Radar Pictures to assign profits from 11 films, including Sony’s Jumanji: Welcome to the Jungle, to Lin’s Filmula Entertainment until the judgment is satisfied.

In 2017, Lin and Brian Oliver acquired the rights to the sci-fi project Rise; based on the popular short directed by David Karlak.

Also in 2017, it was announced that Lin and Oliver are set to produce the upcoming remake of The Wild Geese, a 1978 cult mission movie written by William Monahan. Additionally, Lin has acquired the rights to adapt Maureen Callahan's '90s-set fashion book Champagne Supernovas into a television series. In November 2017, it was announced that Lin will be teaming up with 3 Arts Entertainment to develop undercover agent Edward Follis' memoir The Dark Art: My Undercover Life in Narco-Terrorism.

In May 2018, Lin's Filmula entered a co-financing deal with Brian Oliver’s New Republic Pictures, which struck a first-look co-financing and distribution deal with Paramount Pictures. Also in May, it was announced that Lin and Filmula will produce and finance the upcoming action picture "Escape from the North Pole." In September 2018, it was reported that Lin's Filmula acquired the rights to adapt James L. Swanson's upcoming book Lion in Winter, based on the true story of America's most prolific Chicago Outfit syndicate mob boss, into a feature film.

In November 2018, it was announced that Beijing-based distributor E Stars will co-finance and co-produce a range of U.S. film projects with Lin's Filmula. Also that month, it was reported that Filmula had tapped screenwriter Andrew Farotte to pen the script for an upcoming original film about World War II in the Pacific.

He received his Executive MBA from the UCLA Anderson School of Management in 2022.

== Filmography ==
Title	Year	Role
Hesher	2010	Producer
Another Happy Day	2011	Producer
Bernie	2011	Executive Producer
Queen of Hearts (short)	2016	Director, producer and writer
American Made	2017	Executive Producer
