= Miracle Fish =

- Poster
- Directed by: Luke Doolan
- Written by: Luke Doolan
- Produced by: Drew Bailey
- Starring: Karl Beattie; Brendan Donoghue; Tara Morice
- Cinematography: Brad Shield
- Edited by: Luke Doolan
- Music by: François Tetaz
- Production companies: Druid Films; Blue-Tongue Films; Qoob
- Distributed by: IndieFlix; Shorts International
- Release date: 16 January 2009 (Sundance)
- Running time: 17 minutes
- Country: Australia
- Language: English

Miracle Fish is a 2009 Australian short film. It was written, directed, and edited by Luke Doolan, and produced by Drew Bailey. The film stars Karl Beattie, Brendan Donoghue and Tara Morice. It was nominated for Best Live Action Short at the 82nd Academy Awards.

== Plot ==
Joe (Karl Beattie) wakes up on his 8th birthday. His mum drops him off late to school, saying that there is a present in his lunch box. Feeling miserable, Joe goes through class and break time, being bullied at both turns. He finds that his present is a 'Miracle Fish,' a piece of plastic in the shape of a fish that you place in your hand and what it does determines your future. Joe places it in his hand and it says that he is compassionate.

The bullies appear and afterwards, Joe sneaks off to sick bay. He falls asleep until after 1:00 p.m.. He wanders around the school finding it completely abandoned. He plays around, writing on the walls, taking food from the canteen, skateboarding along the hallways. In the auditorium, he finds a book about alien abduction, and ponders if that is what happened to the students and teachers.

After some time, he hears running water and goes into the teachers' staffroom to find a tap has been turned on. He turns it off and leaves the room, closing the door behind him, not noticing the bloody hand print on the back of it.

A short while later, he hears a phone ringing and goes into a classroom to investigate. He finds a teacher's phone in her desk and answers it to hear a stranger's voice on the other end. After a few moments, with the voice asking Joe who he is, it urges him to find a place to hide. It is too late though, as a man with a rifle enters the room with bloodstains on his clothes. Joe, not understanding the situation, asks the man if he is injured, and the man begins talking about how life is meant to be able to go in any direction you choose, but in reality it doesn't. "You can't turn 65 cents into a dollar." Joe notices a laser dot on his forehead, and the man is quickly shot and killed by police who flood the room, grabbing up Joe, and checking that the man is dead.

== Cast ==
Character	Actor
Joe	Karl Beattie
Man	Brendan Donoghue
Mum	Tara Morice
Peter	Angus Russo
Matt	Jason Doric
Front Office Lady	Eliza Logan
Teacher	Cath Esposito
Peter Unwin/TRG Negotiator	Kieran Darcy-Smith
TRG#1	Sebastian Dickins
TRG#2	Ashley Fairfield

== Production ==
The short film was shot over two and a half days. The first two days, Saturday and Sunday 18 and 19 October 2008, were filmed at Matraville Sports High School, the half-day was filmed on Monday 20 October 2008 at Annandale North Public School with students from Class 4D volunteering to play both the extras in the school yard and in the classroom. The film was shot using the Red One camera at 4K recording format.
