= I Love Sarah Jane =

- Directed by: Spencer Susser
- Written by: David Michôd; Spencer Susser
- Produced by: Angie Fielder; Nash Edgerton; Spencer Susser; Mike Seymour
- Starring: Brad Ashby; Mia Wasikowska; Vladimir Matovic
- Cinematography: Adam Arkapaw
- Edited by: Spencer Susser
- Music by: Michael Lira
- Production companies: Blue-Tongue Films; Aquarius Films; The Last Picture Company
- Release date: 15 January 2008 (Sundance Film Festival)
- Running time: 14 minutes
- Country: Australia
- Language: English

I Love Sarah Jane is a 2008 Australian zombie horror short film directed by Spencer Susser and written by David Michôd and Spencer Susser. The film had its world premiere at the Sundance Film Festival on 15 January 2008.

In 2011, the short was reported to be under development to be turned into a feature film.

== Plot ==
Jimbo is 13 and can think of only one girl—Sarah Jane. And no matter what stands in his way—bullies, violence, chaos, or zombies—nothing will stop him from finding a way into her world.

== Cast ==
- Brad Ashby as Jimbo
- Mia Wasikowska as Sarah Jane
- Vladimir Matovic as Joey
- Beau South as Rory
- Peter Yacoub as Gram
- Richard Mueck as Zombie
- Anton Enus as Newsreader

== Reception ==
=== Critical response ===
The film earned mainly positive reviews from critics. MarBelle of short of the week gave film the positive review said "The thing about ILSJ—co-written by Susser and David Michôd—is that if you were to strip away the high production values and outlandish world setting, there’d still be at its core a touching age-old story of teen awkwardness in relating to the object of your desire that places our hero Jimbo in the shoes of Kevin Arnold or Dawn Wiener before him, it’s just that their obstacles were slightly less brain hungry." Amber Wilkinson of Eye For Film gave the film four out of five stars and said "With so many zombie features and, indeed, zombie shorts around, it's hard to make something that feels new, but by mixing up the trappings of a naturalistic coming of age drama with the horror, this short takes a different tack, breathing life and spirit into the undead." Wesley Morris of Boston.com said that "Australian suburb where some parentless neighborhood kids torture a zombie. You wait for several minutes for the title to explain itself, which, in its sweet, jokey finale, it does."

== Awards and official selections ==
- Official Selection - Sundance film festival
- Official Selection - Melbourne International Film Festival
- Official Selection - Clermont-Ferrand International Short Film Festival
- Official Selection - Puchon International Fantastic Film Festival
- Official Selection - Cannes Film Festival
- Official Selection - Seattle International Film Festival
- Official Selection - Sydney Film Festival
- Official Selection - Nashville Film Festival
- Official Selection - Arizona International Film Festival
- Official Selection - London Film Festival
- Official Selection - Telluride Film Festival
- Official Selection - Edinburgh International Film Festival
- Official Selection - Los Angeles Film Festival
- Included in Wholphin 10

Year	Award	Category	Recipient	Result
2008	Arizona International Film Festival	Reel Frontier Merit Award	Spencer Susser	Won
2008	Clermont-Ferrand International Short Film Festival	Canal+ Award (International Competition)	Spencer Susser	Won
2008	Nashville Film Festival	Best Narrative Short	Spencer Susser	Won
2008	Puchon International Fantastic Film Festival	Grand Prize for Short Film	Spencer Susser	Nominated
2008	Melbourne International Film Festival	Most Innovative Australian Short Film	Spencer Susser	Won

== See also ==
- Cinema of Australia
