= Hesher (film) =

- Theatrical release poster
- Directed by: Spencer Susser
- Screenplay by: Spencer Susser; David Michôd
- Story by: Brian Charles Frank
- Produced by: Natalie Portman; Spencer Susser; Morgan Susser; Lucy Cooper; Johnny Lin; Scott Prisand; Win Sheridan
- Starring: Joseph Gordon-Levitt; Rainn Wilson; Natalie Portman; Piper Laurie; Devin Brochu
- Cinematography: Morgan Susser
- Edited by: Michael McCusker; Spencer Susser
- Music by: Francois Tetaz
- Production companies: The Last Picture Company; Corner Store Entertainment; CatchPlay; Blue-Tongue Films; Handsomecharlie Films
- Distributed by: Newmarket Films; Wrekin Hill Entertainment
- Release dates: January 22, 2010 (Sundance); May 13, 2011 (United States)
- Running time: 105 minutes
- Country: United States
- Language: English
- Budget: $7 million
- Box office: $449,702

Hesher is a 2010 American dark comedy co-edited, written, and directed by Spencer Susser, from a screenplay by Susser and David Michôd, and based on a story by Brian Charles Frank. Starring Joseph Gordon-Levitt, Rainn Wilson, Natalie Portman, Piper Laurie, and Devin Brochu, the film follows the titular rebellious metalhead (Gordon-Levitt) and his chaotic misadventures with T. J. Forney (Brochu), a depressed high schooler coming to terms with the death of his mother in a car crash.

Several songs by heavy metal bands like Metallica and Motörhead are featured in the film, as well as on the soundtrack. Principal photography began in Los Angeles on May 2, 2009, and concluded on June 15.

Hesher premiered at the Sundance Film Festival on January 22, 2010, where it was nominated for the Grand Jury Prize. The film was theatrically released in the United States on May 13, 2011, to mixed reviews from critics and was a box office failure. This is the only feature film written and directed by Susser to date.

== Plot ==
Following the loss of his mother in a car crash, high school freshman T.J. and his father fall into depression. T.J. becomes obsessed with the car his mother died in and follows it when it is towed away. He and his passive, pill-taking father Paul live with T.J.'s grandmother Madeleine, where they are soon joined by a squatter, Hesher, a vulgar, foul-mouthed heavy metal-loving lout with no concern for social conventions.

Dustin, a bully from the towing service, finds his car vandalized and blames T.J., who is saved by Nicole, a grocery store clerk. Hesher witnesses Dustin attacking T.J. at school, but does nothing. Later, Hesher sets Dustin's car on fire, leading to police questioning T.J. T.J. spies on Nicole at the grocery store, as he likes her. When she causes a fender-bender, Hesher comes to her rescue.

That night, T.J. and Paul get into an argument. Hesher bonds with Madeleine and says he will join her on her morning walk, but the next morning, he finds her dead. The death affects all three men in the house and Hesher storms out. T.J. takes money to buy his parents' car back, but it is gone. He decides to give the money to Nicole for her financial troubles, but finds her in her apartment, having sex with Hesher. He damages Hesher's van in response and yells that he does not want to see either of them again.

T.J. sneaks into Dustin's house and threatens him, asking where the car went. He finds out the car was taken to be crushed. Dustin attacks T.J. until Hesher arrives and injures Dustin in defense. Upset that Hesher hurt Dustin, T.J. flees and goes to the junkyard. He climbs into the wrecked car and dreams of his mother's death, waking when the car is moved to be crushed. While getting ready for his grandmother's funeral, Nicole comes and apologizes to T.J. for hurting his feelings.

At the funeral, Hesher walks in drunk and monologues about how when he was younger he blew up the gas tank of a car and shrapnel destroyed one of his testicles. He got caught up in the loss of his testicle, focusing on it so much he forgot he still had a right testicle and working penis. He draws the parallel to T.J.'s situation, implying that even though they lost their wife and mother, the father and son still have each other. He then announces that he promised Grandma he would go on a walk with her and pushes the casket down the road. Shocked at first, T.J. and Paul eventually join Hesher on the walk.

The next day, Paul shaves for the first time in weeks and tells T.J. that Hesher is gone. He then shows T.J. the compacted remains of his mother's car, which Hesher has left in the driveway. On the roof of the house, Hesher has spray painted in huge white letters, "Hesher was here".

== Cast ==
- Joseph Gordon-Levitt as Hesher
- Rainn Wilson as Paul Forney
- Natalie Portman as Nicole
- Devin Brochu as T. J. Forney
- Piper Laurie as Madeleine Forney
- John Carroll Lynch as Larry
- Audrey Wasilewski as Coleen Bolder
- Brendan Hill as Dustin
- Monica Staggs as Mom
- Frank Collison as Funeral Director
- Milt Kogan as Doctor

== Production ==
Spencer Susser after finishing highschool, started his career with an apprenticeship in a commercial post-production house. Susser used the available equipment and learned to edit, impressing his bosses and getting promoted him to editor. After some time he realized he wanted to be a director and spent several years making commercials and short films, before deciding to write his own feature film. Susser wanted to write a film that he would want to see and decided to tell a story about a metalhead (or "hesher") who befriends a family dealing with a tragic loss. The story was influenced by the death of one of his brothers. Another brother Morgan Susser served as Cinematographer. He sent the Natalie Portman who he had met while making a behind-the-scenes video on the set of Star Wars: Episode II – Attack of the Clones, and she signed on to play the female lead and as also work as producer for the first time. The story is credited to Brian Charles Frank who wrote a script called Hesher, about a group of teenage nerds that meet a heavy metal character who teaches them how to play music for a battle of the bands competition. Taking the title as inspiration Susser worked with David Michôd to write his own script with a different story.The lead character Hesher was inspired by former bass player Metallica Cliff Burton. Metallica allowed the film to use their logo font on the poster and their songs on the soundtrack.

Australian actor Scott Ryan was cast as Hesher, and began rehearsals with Natalie Portman. John C. Reilly pulled out from the film and Hesher was recast with Joseph Gordon-Levitt taking on the role.

At the Sundance Film Festival North Americann domestic distribution rights for the film were sold to Newmarket Films in a deal in the $1 million range.

== Reception ==
On review aggregation website Rotten Tomatoes 55% of 78 film critics have given the film a positive review, with an average rating of 5.8 out of 10, and the site's consensus stating "It has a dark sense of humor and a refreshing lack of sentimentality, but like its title character, Hesher isn't really interested in going anywhere." On Metacritic, it has a weighted average score of 45 out of 100 based on 26 reviews, indicating "mixed or average" reviews.

Peter Travers of Rolling Stone praised the film and Gordon-Levitt's performance, stating "So what if Hesher flies off its wobbly handles — it keeps springing funny and touching surprises. The performances are aces. Wilson makes Dad's emergence a subtle marvel. And even when the script edges Gordon-Levitt into Hallmark sentiment, you can't take your eyes off him." Roger Ebert of the Chicago Sun-Times rated the film 2.5 out of 4, and wrote, "Hesher assembles a group of characters who aren't sure why they're in the same movie together. One by one, they have an attraction, but brought together, they're all elbows and angles."
