= Spencer Susser =

American film director

Spencer Susser (born 1977) is an American filmmaker and film editor.

Originally from California, Susser is the only American member of the Australian filmmaking collective Blue-Tongue Films. His short film I Love Sarah Jane, featuring Mia Wasikowska, won Best Narrative Short at the 2008 Nashville Film Festival, the Reel Frontier Merit Award at the Arizona International Film Festival, and the Canal+ Award at the Clermont-Ferrand International Short Film Festival. Susser co-wrote the project with David Michôd. In February 2011, it was reported that Susser is developing a feature-length film based on the short.

His feature film debut Hesher stars Joseph Gordon-Levitt and Natalie Portman. It appeared at the 2010 Sundance Film Festival and was released in the United States on May 13, 2011.

Susser co-directed the music video for Lana Del Rey's song "Summertime Sadness" with Kyle Newman.

== Filmography ==
=== Film ===
Year	Title	Director	Writer	Producer	Editor	Notes
2010	Hesher	Yes	Yes	Yes	Yes	Also title designer
2017	The Greatest Showman	No	No	No	Yes	Also second unit director
2024	Better Man	No	No	No	Yes	Also second unit director and actor Role: "Martin"

=== Short films ===
Year	Title	Director	Writer	Producer	Editor	Notes
1999	Ah Weak & Wide Astry	Yes	Yes	Yes	Yes	
2001	R2-D2: Beneath the Dome	Yes	No	No	No	Also additional cinematographer
2003	Roughing Up with Witness	Yes	Yes	Yes	Yes	
2005	A Love Story	Yes	Yes	Yes	Yes	
2008	I Love Sarah Jane	Yes	Yes	Executive	Yes	
2012	Eugene	Yes	Yes	No	Yes	
2012	Latch Key	No	No	Executive	No	
2012	Today's the Day	No	No	Executive	No	
2013	Happy Accidents	No	No	No	Yes	
2013	The Captain	Yes	Yes	Yes	Yes	
2016	Shiny	Yes	Yes	Yes	Yes	Also cinematographer, visual effects, animator and various voices
2021	Save Ralph	Yes	Yes	Yes	Yes	

==== Camera Department ====
Year	Title	Position	Notes
2002	From Puppets to Pixels: Digital Characters in 'Episode II'	Camera operator	Documentary short film
2005	Lucky	Camera operator	Short film; Also sound recorder
2007	Spider	Second camera	Short film
2009	Inside the Square	Camera operator	Documentary short film
2011	Bear	Additional camera operator	Short film; Also pre-visualization
2016	Treespass	Additional photography	Short film
