= Felicity Price =

Australian actress and screenwriter

- Born: Sydney, Australia
- Education: Victorian College of the Arts
- Occupations: Actor screenwriter
- Years active: 1998–present
- Known for: Wish You Were Here
- Spouse(s): Kieran Darcy-Smith (m. January 7, 2006)
- Children: 2

Felicity Price is an Australian actress and screenwriter. She co-wrote and starred in Wish You Were Here which saw her nominated for the 2012 AACTA Awards for Best Actress in a Leading Role and won Best Original Screenplay.

== Early life ==
Price was born in Sydney, Australia, and grew up in Warrawee, a Northern Sydney suburb. Influenced by her maternal grandmother who was a dancer and actress, Price studied art and theatre in high school. She also sang as part of a comedy a capella pop trio called the Aphrodisiacs. She graduated with a BA in Dramatic Arts from the Victorian College of the Arts.

== Personal life ==
Price has been married to fellow Australian actor, writer and director Kieran Darcy-Smith since 7 January 2006. Actor Joel Edgerton was best man at their wedding and is the godfather of one of their kids. Together, they have two children – a son, Levi born in 2008 and a daughter.

Price and Darcy-Smith moved to Los Angeles in 2012, shortly after their film, Wish You Were Here opened at the Sundance Film Festival. Price holds both US and Australian citizenship.

== Filmography ==
=== Television ===
Year	Title	Role	Type
1997	Big Sky	Kirstie	Season 1, episode 17: "Mile Low Club"
1997	Water Rats	Sally	Season 2, episode 22: "Retribution"
1998	Australia's Most Wanted	Rowena	
2002	Farscape	Princess Katralla	Season 2, 3 episodes
2002	Always Greener	Anne Clarke	Season 2, 4 episodes
2004	The Postcard Bandit	Receptionist	TV movie
2004	The Alice	Felicity Marione	TV movie
2005	Dynasty: The Making of a Guilty Pleasure	Dottie	TV movie
2006	All Saints	Katrina King	Season 9, episode 5: "The Things We Do"
2007	Make or Break	Pilates Instructor	
2009	Home and Away	Jane Avent	Season 22, 8 episodes
2009	My Place	Mrs Thomson	Season 1, episode 9: "1928 Brodie"
2011	Rescue Special Ops	Wendy Schmidt	Season 3, episode 3: "True Romance"
2017	Wolf Creek	Nina Webber	Season 2, 6 episodes
2023	Last King of the Cross	Yael Shipman	Season 1, 9 episodes
2025	Home and Away	Cassandra Poulas	Upcoming role (season 38)

=== Film ===
Year	Title	Role	Type
1998	The Sugar Factory	Jacquiline	Feature film
1998	Occasional Coarse Language	Bookseller	Feature film
1999	Change of Heart	Monique	Feature film
2001	Russian Doll	Phaedra	Feature film
2002	The Doppelgängers	Riley	Short film
2006	Unfolding Florence: The Many Lives of Florence Broadhurst	Young Florence Broadhurst	Documentary film
2007	West	Elizabeth	Feature film
2007	Boys Own Story	Sharleen	Short film
2008	Outside In	Julie Perdiau	Short film
2008	The List	Delivery Florist	Short film
2012	Wish You Were Here	Alice Flannery	Feature film
2015	The Gift	Dr. Angela Derezio	Feature film
2015	The Duel	Naomi	Feature film
2016	Bad Girl	Michelle Anderson	Feature film
2017	Heartthrob	Collette	Feature film
2018	Unregistered	Alexis	Short film
2023	Finally Me	Coach Hunter	Feature film
2023	The Big Dog	Kelly Morgan	Feature film

== Theatre ==
Year	Title	Role	Venue / Co.
1994	The Annotated Briar Rose		Chester Street Uniting Church Hall, Sydney with Bathhouse Arts
1997	Alice in Wonderland	Alice	Melbourne Zoo with EHJ Productions
1997	Romeo and Juliet	Juliet	MTC
1997–08	The Taming of the Shrew	Bianca	Royal Botanic Gardens Victoria & Adelaide Festival with EHJ Productions
1999	The Judas Kiss	Phoebe Cane	Belvoir Theatre Company, Playhouse, Melbourne, Playhouse, Canberra, Capital Theatre, Bendigo
1999	Western	Kitty	Big Eye Studio
1999–2000	Face to Face	Julie	Ensemble Theatre, Riverside Theatres Parramatta, Playhouse, Canberra, Bruce Gordon Theatre, Wollongong with
2001	The Small Poppies	Courtney / Clint's Mum / Thuan	Sydney Opera House with Belvoir Theatre Company
2002	The Lover	Wife / Mistress	Belvoir Theatre Company
2002–03	Room 207 Tesla	Various characters	X-Ray Theatre
2004	Tales of the Arabian Nights	Shahrazad	Laycock Street Theatre, Gosford with Theatre of Image
2005	Cu*t Pie	Charlie	Old Fitzroy Theatre with Tamarama Rock Surfers
2006	Fat Pig	Jeannie	STC
2007–08	Don's Party	Jody	Sydney Opera House with STC, Playhouse, Melbourne with MTC

== Awards and nominations ==
Year	Nominated work	Award	Category	Result
2013	Wish You Were Here	AACTA Awards	Best Original Screenplay (shared with Kieran Darcy-Smith)	Won
2013	Wish You Were Here	AACTA Awards	Best Actress in a Leading Role	Nominated
2013	Wish You Were Here	AACTA Awards	Best Film	Nominated
2013	Wish You Were Here	FCCA Awards	Best Film	Won
2013	Wish You Were Here	FCCA Awards	Best Screenplay (shared with Kieran Darcy-Smith)	Won
2013	Wish You Were Here	FCCA Awards	Best Actress	Nominated
2012	Wish You Were Here	AWGIE Awards	Best Feature Film (shared with Kieran Darcy-Smith)	Nominated
