= Come Away =

2020 fantasy drama film

- Theatrical release poster
- Directed by: Brenda Chapman
- Screenplay by: Marissa Kate Goodhill
- Based on: Alice's Adventures in Wonderland by Lewis Carroll Peter Pan by J. M. Barrie
- Produced by: Leesa Kahn; Andrea Keir; David Oyelowo; James Spring
- Starring: David Oyelowo; Anna Chancellor; Angelina Jolie; Michael Caine; Clarke Peters; Gugu Mbatha-Raw; David Gyasi; Derek Jacobi
- Cinematography: Jules O'Loughlin
- Edited by: Dody Dorn
- Music by: John Debney
- Production companies: Endurance Media; Fred Films; Yoruba Saxon Productions
- Distributed by: Signature Entertainment (United Kingdom); Relativity Media (United States)
- Release dates: January 24, 2020 (Sundance); November 13, 2020 (United States); December 18, 2020 (United Kingdom)
- Running time: 94 minutes
- Countries: United Kingdom; United States
- Language: English
- Box office: $1.7 million

Come Away is a 2020 fantasy drama film directed by Brenda Chapman (in her live-action directorial debut), written by Marissa Kate Goodhill, and starring David Oyelowo, Anna Chancellor, Angelina Jolie, Clarke Peters, David Gyasi, with Gugu Mbatha-Raw, Michael Caine, and Derek Jacobi. The film is an homage to the stories of Peter Pan and Alice's Adventures in Wonderland. The characters of those stories are siblings who try to help their parents overcome the death of their eldest son.

Come Away had its world premiere at the Sundance Film Festival on January 24, 2020, and was released in the United States on November 13, 2020, by Relativity Media and was released in the United Kingdom on December 18, 2020, by Signature Entertainment. It is Relativity's first theatrically released film since 2016's Masterminds.

== Plot ==
A mother reads "The Stolen Child" by William Butler Yeats to her three children, two boys and one girl, and recounts a story of three siblings; Alice, David (The White Rabbit) and Peter, who live with their parents: Jack (The King of Hearts) and Rose Littleton (The Queen of Hearts). The children dwell in a house by a forest on the outskirts of London letting their imaginations run wild.

Alice acts mature in contrast to Peter who regards the local woods as his domain (during one of their trips they discover an eagle feather and a downed boat, with the siblings wondering if they could get it sea-worthy).

Tragedy strikes one day when David, while pretending to fight pirates during a storm, falls into the river, is struck by lightning, and dies. The family copes in different ways; with Jack, a model maker, returning to his bad gambling habits and Rose intending to make a green felt hat that would have been David's birthday present.

To make payments, Peter and Alice go to sell a family heirloom silver pocket watch, during which they shelter a group of street urchins who have pickpocketed an intimidating criminal.

Both siblings meet an eccentric shopkeeper, Hatter (Mad Hatter), who leads them to a money lender and lower crime boss Captain James or CJ (Captain Hook) who, unbeknownst to both of them, is their uncle. Peter later runs into the very same street kids he met earlier who reveal they are known as the Lost Boys and that they have been to a place known only to children called Never Neverland and offer to take him there. Jack later visits his brother to call off his debt collectors, with a jealous James crippling his brother (as a show of loyalty to his crime paymasters) leading to Jack losing his hand.

Peter responds by seeking out these Lost Boys to help rob James of the fortune of gold coins Peter spied on earlier that he is safeguarding for the various criminal organizations of London's underworld. When James catches his nephew in the act Peter cuts off his uncle's hand in a sword duel before fleeing.

With his uncle and cohorts hot on his heels, Peter is forced to run away from home, taking his late brother's newly finished hat with the eagle feather in it and dressed in his brother's hand me down green clothes.

Alice last spies Peter on the now fixed boat sailing away crewed by the Lost Boys who are taking her brother to Never Neverland (with the ship apparently being pulled into the air by the wind itself thanks to a fairy, Tinker Bell, who was disguised as a little brass bell that Alice came across). Peter briefly returns to stop by while his family sleeps to deposit some of the stolen coins, which he irregularly does over the years to support his loved ones.

The mother finishes telling her story which has now been established as being of Alice's own early life to her children, who are revealed to be Wendy Darling and her brothers, John and Michael.

Coming back from going out for the evening with her husband Mr. Darling (George Darling), Alice suddenly hears a familiar crowing that both her brothers used to do and heads upstairs to find the children's bedroom windows thrown wide open and a notable eagle feather on the floor beneath said window. She looks out of their window at the night sky, hoping it was her brother who came to take his niece and nephews off to this supposed Never Neverland and will likely look after them while they are there.

== Cast ==
- Angelina Jolie as Rose Littleton
- David Oyelowo as Jack Littleton
- Keira Chansa as Alice Littleton
  - Gugu Mbatha-Raw as adult Alice Littleton
- Jordan Anthony Nash as Peter Littleton
- Anna Chancellor as Eleanor Morrow
- Clarke Peters asHatter
- David Gyasi as Captain James
- Michael Caine as Charlie
- Derek Jacobi as Mr. Brown
- Jenny Galloway as Hannah O'Farral
- Reece Yates as David Littleton
- Ned Dennehy as Smee
- Daniel Swain as Mr. Darling
- Ava Fillery as Wendy Darling
- Darling Brothers
  - Jonathan Garcia as John Darling
  - Carter Thomas as Michael Darling
- The Lost Boys
  - Harry Newman as Twin 1
  - Oliver Newman as Twin 2
  - Jack Veal as Curly
  - Rishi Kuppa as Tootles
  - Alfie Hoang as Slightly
  - Nana Agyeman-Bediako as Nibs

== Production ==
The project was announced in May 2016, with The Prince of Egypt and Brave co-director Brenda Chapman hired to direct.

In May 2018, Angelina Jolie and David Oyelowo were cast to play the parents of Alice and Peter, with both actors also taking producer roles. In August 2018, Anna Chancellor, Clarke Peters, Gugu Mbatha-Raw, Michael Caine, David Gyasi, Derek Jacobi and Jenny Galloway joined the cast. Additional financing came from Ace Pictures, Creasun Entertainment USA and Tin Res Entertainment; executive producers include David Haring, Minglu Ma, George Acogny, Timur Bekbosunov, Johnny Chang, Peter Wong, Emma Lee, Gia Muresan, Simon Fawcett and Steve Barnett.

The filming commenced at Shad Thames in London in August 2018, as well as Windsor Great Park in both the South Forest and around Johnson's pond. In October 2018, the production moved to Los Angeles before concluding later that month.

== Release ==
It had its world premiere at the Sundance Film Festival on January 24, 2020. In October 2020, Relativity Media acquired U.S. distribution rights to the film and had its release on November 13, 2020.

== Reception ==
=== Box office ===
In its opening weekend the film grossed $108,000 from 475 theaters. The film earned $184,477 in the United States and Canada, $1,562,383 in other territories, for a total worldwide gross of $1,746,860.

=== Critical response ===
Review aggregator website Rotten Tomatoes reported that 29% of 69 reviews of the film were positive, with an average rating of 4.9/10. The website's critics consensus reads, "Largely lacking the fairytale magic it seeks to conjure, Come Away is an initially intriguing fantasy that never really takes flight." According to Metacritic, which sampled 17 critic reviews and calculated a weighted average score of 40 out of 100, the film received "mixed or average" reviews.

After its Sundance premiere, Ben Pearson of Slash Film gave a positive review by stating "A new children's classic has arrived, and this timeless fairytale will surely enchant audiences for generations to come." John DeFore of The Hollywood Reporter gave a negative review by stating "A wealth of familiar storybook material and a cast including Angelina Jolie and David Oyelowo will draw attention, but a handsome production and beautiful cast aren't enough to get this fantasy off the ground." Conversely, Peter Bradshaw, writing in The Guardian, gave the film one star out of a possible five, describing it as "a muddled, leaden fantasy adventure for Christmas which feels as if someone put all the Quality Streets in a saucepan and melted them together, with the wrappers still on ... an indigestible lump of star turns, superstar cameos and references to classic children's literature".
