= Sanctum (film) =

2011 film by Alister Grierson

- Theatrical release poster
- Directed by: Alister Grierson
- Written by: John Garvin; Andrew Wight
- Produced by: Andrew Wight
- Starring: Richard Roxburgh; Rhys Wakefield; Alice Parkinson; Dan Wyllie; Ioan Gruffudd
- Cinematography: Jules O'Loughlin
- Edited by: Mark Warner
- Music by: David Hirschfelder
- Production companies: Wayfare Entertainment; Great Wight
- Distributed by: Universal Pictures; Relativity Media
- Release dates: 3 February 2011 (Australia); 4 February 2011 (United States)
- Running time: 109 minutes
- Countries: Australia; United States
- Language: English
- Budget: $30 million
- Box office: $108.6 million

Sanctum is a 2011 3D action-thriller film directed by Alister Grierson, and written by John Garvin and Andrew Wight. It stars Richard Roxburgh, Rhys Wakefield, Alice Parkinson, Dan Wyllie, and Ioan Gruffudd. The film was co-presented and executive produced by James Cameron.

The concept was inspired by an incident in 1988 which Wight and other cave divers were trapped in the underwater cave systems of Nullarbor Plain after a storm collapsed the entrance. A co-production between Australia and the United States, with filming occurring in the former, the film uses 3D photography techniques previously used for Cameron's Avatar. Universal Pictures and Relativity Media bought the distribution rights for various territories.

The film was released in Australia on 4 February 2011, and a day later in the United States. Despite receiving generally negative reviews from critics, it was a box office success, grossing $108 million against a $30 million budget. It also received an AACTA Award nomination for Best Visual Effects. Universal Studios Home Entertainment released Sanctum on DVD, Blu-ray Disc, and Blu-ray 3D on 7 June 2011.

== Plot ==
Seventeen-year-old Joshua "Josh" McGuire, expedition bank-roller Carl and his girlfriend, Victoria "Vic", travel to the Esa'ala Cave, an underwater cave exploration site in Papua New Guinea. Josh's father, Frank, a master diver, has already established a forward base camp at a lower level inside the cave, where the team has been exploring for weeks. The team below prepares to dive into an unexplored area of the system.

While exploring the entrance to the new system, Judes loses use of her air mask, forcing Frank to buddy breathe. Judes panics and tries to keep the mask on, but Frank forces the mask off of her knowing he will not have enough air to make it back to the team. As Judes drowns, Josh watches on a monitor at "forward camp" and presumes the worst of his father. Frank reveals that Judes had dived in an exhausted state since they had to retrieve the extra bailout tanks, a task Josh did not do. Meanwhile, their above-ground crew realises that a big storm is preparing to hit their location. They attempt to warn the team below, but are unsuccessful.

Wanting to return to the surface, Josh climbs back with Luko, Liz, and J.D, but water begins rushing in from their exit. The storm has turned into a cyclone, causing flash floods that begin to fill the cave. As J.D. and Liz make their way up through "the elevator" (an area leading up to the main entrance of the cave), Josh is unable to leave his father and the dive team behind to their doom and turns back with Luko. They discover that Frank and the team have already evacuated their camp and are assisting Victoria as she climbs up out of the cavern. Josh leaps in to help, strapping a rope around a nearby boulder and forming a belay. Unfortunately, the boulder begins to give way. The water rushes through and forces Victoria and Josh to fall back down into the flooded base camp. Luko is injured when the boulder breaks loose, sealing the shaft and throwing him back down into the cavern. He is swept into an underwater tunnel.

The team decides to use the unexplored tunnel as an escape route from the flooding cavern. Before the team can leave, a severely injured and mutilated Luko surfaces. Seeing that his friend is in pain and near death, Frank mercifully drowns him.

The team makes it through to the other side of the system. Having refused to wear Judes' old wetsuit, Victoria suffers from the cold water. Meanwhile, George—an experienced, veteran diver—has become ill due to the dive and is dying, unbeknownst to the rest of the team. The team continues through the system, following the flow of water out toward the sea. George realises that he cannot continue and hides himself so as not to burden the rest of the team.

The team arrives at a seemingly dead end. A hole in the bottom of the cave separates them from the other side of their path. Josh fishes a line across and begins to transfer their gear and each other. As Victoria begins to make her way across she catches her hair in her rope gear; she loses her grip, leaving her hair the only thing holding her weight. Using her knife, she attempts to cut away the hair, but severs her rope and falls to her death. At the sight of Victoria's death, Carl becomes emotionally unstable. In a fit of panic, he steals the last remaining rebreather and disappears into the tunnel. Josh and Frank find another way out through a crevasse in the cavern. The tunnel leads them to a sunlit cavern where an unidentified WWII Japanese tank collapsed through the surface years ago. Unfortunately, the hole in the roof where the tank fell is the only opening and they are unable to climb out. They spend the rest of the day there and proceed back into the cave by night.

They discover Carl, whose state of mind has worsened, having found Victoria's corpse. Carl attempts to murder Frank for Victoria's death but Josh separates the two. Frank has been gravely injured, having fallen on a stalagmite that punctured his back. When Carl wakes, he realizes the gravity of his actions and solemnly disappears into the tunnel. In pain, Frank requests that Josh drown him. Josh reluctantly does so, and swims into the tunnel.

He encounters Carl, who has already drowned looking for the exit. Just as he begins to lose hope, Josh discovers a way out through the cave to open ocean. He emerges from the water and crawls onto the beach, where he is discovered by fishermen.

== Cast ==
- Richard Roxburgh as Frank McGuire
- Ioan Gruffudd as Carl Hurley
- Rhys Wakefield as Joshua "Josh" McGuire
- Alice Parkinson as Victoria "Vic" Elaine
- Dan Wyllie as George
- Christopher James Baker as J.D.
- Nicole Downs as Liz
- Allison Cratchley as Judes
- Cramer Cain as Luko
- Andrew Hansen as Dex
- John Garvin as Jim Sergeant

== Production ==
Sanctum was inspired by the film's co-writer Andrew Wight's experience with a 1988 cave diving expedition in Australia that resulted in 13 cavers becoming trapped in one of the world's largest underwater cave systems in Nullarbor Plain after a freak storm collapsed the entrance. That incident was documented in the film Nullarbor Dreaming.

James Cameron served as executive producer for Sanctum. Even though the film's plot takes place in Esa'ala Cave Papua New Guinea, most of the film was shot in Australia (Gold Coast, Queensland). Sanctum employs 3D photography techniques Cameron developed to film Avatar. All of the underwater sequences took place in a large water tank at the Village Roadshow Studios in Queensland. Real caves were also filmed in South Australia's cave-diving region around Mount Gambier. Stunt diver Agnes Milowka, who appears as a double in the already-released film, drowned in one of these caves on 27 February 2011 when she reportedly ran out of air. In striking similarities to the movie script, she also left her spare tank behind, to force the way through the tight restriction, and it is actually her playing Judes' drowning scene.

Universal Pictures and Relativity Media paid $12 million for rights to distribute the film in the United States and Canada, and in several foreign countries; initially, Relativity planned to produce under their Rogue Pictures banner. FilmNation Entertainment handled international sales, through a deal with Relativity.

== Soundtrack ==
- "Rabaul Taun" – performed by Junior Kokoratts
- "Maipope" – performed by Tusiti Roots
- "Ride of the Valkyries" – performed by Ioan Gruffudd

== Reception ==
=== Box office ===
Sanctum opened with $9.2 million in its first weekend, coming in second behind The Roommate. As of March 2011, Sanctum was the tenth-highest-grossing Australian film at the international box office. The film also made $3.8 million at the Australian box office.

=== Critical response ===
Rotten Tomatoes reports that 29% of 171 critics gave the film a positive review, with an average rating of 4.5/10. The site's critics consensus reads: "Sanctum is beautifully photographed, and it makes better use of 3-D technology than most, but that doesn't make up for its ham-handed script and lifeless cast." Metacritic assigned the film a weighted average score of 42 out of 100 based on 33 critics, indicating "mixed or average reviews". Audiences polled by CinemaScore gave the film an average grade of C+ on an A+ to F scale.

The Age's Jim Schembri gave it 3½ stars out of 5 and said "the drama might be shallow but the visuals are great". The UK's Daily Express gave it 3 out of 5, writing: "The action doesn't quite conjure up the claustrophobic intensity you expect but the father-son-storyline is sufficiently muscular".

=== Awards ===
Australian Cinematographers Society 2011

Award	Category	Nominee	Result
NSW & ACT Silver Award	Feature Film	Jules O'Loughlin (director of photography)	Won

Australian Film Institute 2012

Award	Category	Nominee	Result
AACTA Award	Best Visual Effects	David Booth; Peter Webb; Ineke Majoor; Glenn Melenhorst	Nominated

=== Home video ===
Universal Studios Home Entertainment released Sanctum on DVD, Blu-ray Disc, and Blu-ray 3D on 7 June 2011.

== See also ==
- Survival film
