= Deborah Galanos =

Australian actress

Deborah Galanos is an Australian actress of Greek heritage and a National Institute of Dramatic Art acting degree graduate. Before NIDA, Galanos attended Sydney University and UNSW studying Arts & Law. She has appeared in many theatre, television and film roles and is best known for her role as Dr Meredith George in ABC's Children's Hospital. However, since 1990, most of her work has been in the theatre, and through years of touring has performed on most stages all over Australia.

Galanos has appeared in many television drama series such as Redfern Now, G.P., Police Rescue, My Place, Rake, Pulse (ABC), Murder Call, English at Work (SBS Series), Neighbours, Home and Away, All Saints, Camp (NBC), Street Smart and A Country Practice.

Galanos has also appeared in films including Chasing Comets, Razzle Dazzle: A Journey into Dance, No Worries, Inside Out, Cavity and The Premonition.

Galanos was nominated for Sydney Theatre Awards in 2015 and in 2016, for her roles in Sport For Jove's highly acclaimed Antigone, and for her role of Dolores in Mophead's The House Of Ramon Iglesias. She was also in the multi-awarded Metamorphoses for Apocalypse Theatre Company, and in State Theatre Company of South Australia's lauded The Gods of Strangers by Elena Carapetis, directed by Geordie Brookman. Having worked with Sydney Theatre Company, Belvoir, Ensemble, she features in Griffin Theatre's 2020 season in Alma De Groen's Wicked Sisters, directed by Nadia Tass.
