= Alister Grierson =

Australian film director and scriptwriter

Alister Grierson (born 1969) is an Australian film director and scriptwriter.

== Early life and education ==
Born in Canberra, he completed his secondary schooling at Canberra Grammar School, graduated in Economics and Arts from the Australian National University and studied Japanese in Tokyo. As an under-18 Australian Rules player, he represented the ACT in the Teal Cup but later switched to Rugby, playing 1st grade both for his school and the ANU. Whilst at university, his interest in film-making developed, and he later gained a Master of Arts in Directing at AFTRS. He has shot 15 short films winning three Tropfest awards and is the director of the feature film, Kokoda, which he co-wrote.

== Career ==
In 2009, Grierson was invited to the Avatar set during shooting by James Cameron, and was selected to direct a 3D cave-diving drama Sanctum, using the Cameron-developed Fusion Camera System. The script is inspired by the near-death experience of one of the writers, Andrew Wight, who was trapped in a cave collapse under the Nullarbor Plain. It was shot at Warner Roadshow Studios on the Queensland Gold Coast, and the film opened 4 February 2011. By mid-March the film had joined the top ten Worldwide Box Office Results (Australian Films): All Time, in ninth position. The worldwide gross had reached $108,943,221 by 19 October 2011.

He is the director of Parer's War, starring Matthew Le Nevez and Adelaide Clemens, a dramatised biopic about Damien Parer for the ABC. Although set in Sydney (for the Australian locations), much of the filming was done in Queensland. The script, by Alison Nisselle, is an adaptation of Neil McDonald's book Damien Parer’s War. Released on 27 April 2014, the film attracted the following comments from Graeme Blundell in The Australian: "Parer's War is taut, intelligently constructed and sharply executed by Grierson,..." and "It’s all beautifully put together by Grierson..."

Grierson directed the final three episodes of both series of the award-winning ABC serial Nowhere Boys.

He directed Tiger, written by Michael Pugliese and Prem Singh. Mickey Rourke plays Frank Donovan in the film, which is produced by Mary Aloe, and co-stars Pugliese, Singh and Janel Parrish. Tiger was released at the San Diego International Film Festival on 13 October 2018 where it won Best Feature Film.
