= Inside the Square =

- Directed by: David Michôd
- Produced by: Luke Doolan; Nash Edgerton; Louise Smith
- Starring: David Roberts; Claire van der Boom; Joel Edgerton; Anthony Hayes; Peter Phelps; Bill Hunter
- Edited by: Luke Doolan; Katie Flaxman
- Music by: David McCarthy
- Production companies: Blue Tongue Films; Film Depot
- Release date: 5 May 2009; (Australia)
- Running time: 30 minutes
- Country: Australia
- Language: English

Inside the Square is a 2009 documentary film directed by David Michôd. It is a 30 minutes behind-the-scenes look at the making of 2008 neo-noir thriller film The Square directed by Nash Edgerton, with particular emphasis on the style and difficulties arose during the shooting and the experience of cast and crew during the making of film. It had a limited release in Australia on 5 March 2009.

== Synopsis ==
Behind the scenes production footage and interview of cast and crew of 2008 film The Square.

== Cast ==
- David Michôd as Interviewer
- Nash Edgerton as himself
- David Roberts as himself
- Claire van der Boom as himself
- Joel Edgerton as himself
- Anthony Hayes as himself
- Hanna Mangan-Lawrence as herself
- Peter Phelps as himself
- Kieran Darcy-Smith as himself
- Bredan Donoghue as himself
- Bill Hunter as himself
- Julian Morrow as himself
- Sam Petty as himself
- Louise Smith as herself
- Luke Doolan as himself

== Production ==
After the release of 2008 film The Square, David Michôd made the documentary on the film with the help of behind the scene footage available. He also interview the cast and crew of the film. They talk about their experience of shooting the film.

Talking about making the documentary on the production of film, Michôd said "just bearing witness to the battle of a feature film shoot is a good learning experience."

== See also ==
- Cinema of Australia
