= Solo (2008 film) =

- Directed by: David Michod; Jennifer Peedom
- Screenplay by: David Michod; Chris Thorburn
- Produced by: Chris Hilton
- Starring: Andrew McAuley
- Cinematography: Helen Barrow; Jonathan Biggins; Simon Higgins
- Edited by: Scott Gray; Mark Fox
- Music by: Lisa Gerrard (composer); Sam Petty (Sound)
- Production company: Essential Media and Entertainment
- Distributed by: Hopscotch Films
- Release date: 8 November 2008
- Running time: 58 minutes
- Country: Australia
- Language: English

Solo (also known as Solo: Lost at Sea and Solitary Endeavour on the Southern Ocean) is a 2008 documentary film directed by David Michod and Jennifer Peedom. It narrates the story of Australian adventurer Andrew McAuley who attempted a solo kayak crossing from Tasmania to New Zealand.

After a month at sea, his mission ended in tragedy. His body was never recovered but his kayak was, as were video tapes documenting his journey. These tapes, together with footage of McAuley's preparation and interviews with his support crew including wife Vicki, form the basis of this documentary.

== Synopsis ==
In January 2007, thirty years after the first man-powered crossing of the Tasman Sea by row boat, Andrew McAuley set out on his quest to become the first person to kayak from Australia to New Zealand to cross 1600 km of one of the most dangerous oceans on Earth - the Southern Ocean stretch of the Tasman Sea. After a month at sea, Andrew had endured all the difficulties and a three-day Category 9 storm. On 9 February, New Zealand maritime authorities received his distress call but they could not save his life. His body has never been recovered.

Solo is a psychological portrait of McAuley's determination to claim a first and conquer the unknown - something that ultimately cost him his life.

== Production ==
Production of the documentary began in 2008, a year after McAuley's death. The film was to be based on his journey, and also utilise his recovered video tapes.

Director Jennifer Peedom said about the subject of the film that "There's a very fine line between making it and not making it, and he didn’t make it. And it's only then that people turn around and say, "Well, you know, what are you doing it in the first place for?," you know. So, it is an interesting kind of area, and I think there is no black and white."

David Michod the co-director on the film said that "That footage was so compelling. Just so powerful. I came into this thing just wanting to know what might lead someone to attempt something that would have such a powerful and emotional effect on him." He further added, "What I started to see really quickly was that the Andrew who existed on land in preparing for his trip or talking about how his first attempt hadn't worked out, was a very different character to the one out at sea. The one out at sea seemed somehow alive."

== Release and reception ==
The film premiered on 15 September 2008 on National Geographic and then screened at the Sheffield International Documentary Festival on 8 November 2008. After that it screened at a number of film festivals. On 16 April 2009 it was broadcast on ABC1.

The film earned mostly positive reviews. Rod Yates of Empire Online gave the film five stars and said "As a tribute to a man – and man’s – insatiable search for adventure, it’s unforgettable." Paul Kalina of The Age also praised the film by saying "The film is harrowing and poetic, and provokes difficult ethical questions about those who practise - and film - acts of extreme peril."

The film DVD was released on 19 March 2009.

== Awards and official selections ==
- Official Selection - International Film Festival of India (IFFI)
- Official Selection - Sheffield International Documentary Festival
- Official Selection - International Documentary Film Festival Amsterdam (IDFA)
- Official Selection - Adelaide International Film Festival
- Official Selection - St Tropez-based Festival des Antipodes
- Official Selection - Mountain Film, Telluride USA

Year	Award	Category	Recipient	Result
2010	Australian Screen Directors Guild Awards	Best Direction in a documentary	David Michod; Jennifer Peedom	Won
2010	Edinburgh Mountain Film Festival	Best Film	David Michod; Jennifer Peedom	Won
2010	Prague International film festival	Grand Prix	David Michod; Jennifer Peedom	Won
2009	Banff Mountain Film Festival	Best Film	David Michod; Jennifer Peedom	Won
2009	Festival du Film Voyage & Adventure, Montreal Canada	Grand Prix	David Michod; Jennifer Peedom	Won
2009	Vancouver International Mountain Film Festival	Grand Jury Prize	David Michod; Jennifer Peedom	Won
2009	Australian Film Institute	Best Documentary Under One Hour	Jennifer Peedom	Won
2009	Hory a Mesto Festival in Slovakia	Grand Prize	David Michod; Jennifer Peedom	Won

== See also ==
- Cinema of Australia
- Andrew McAuley
