= David Michôd =

Australian film director

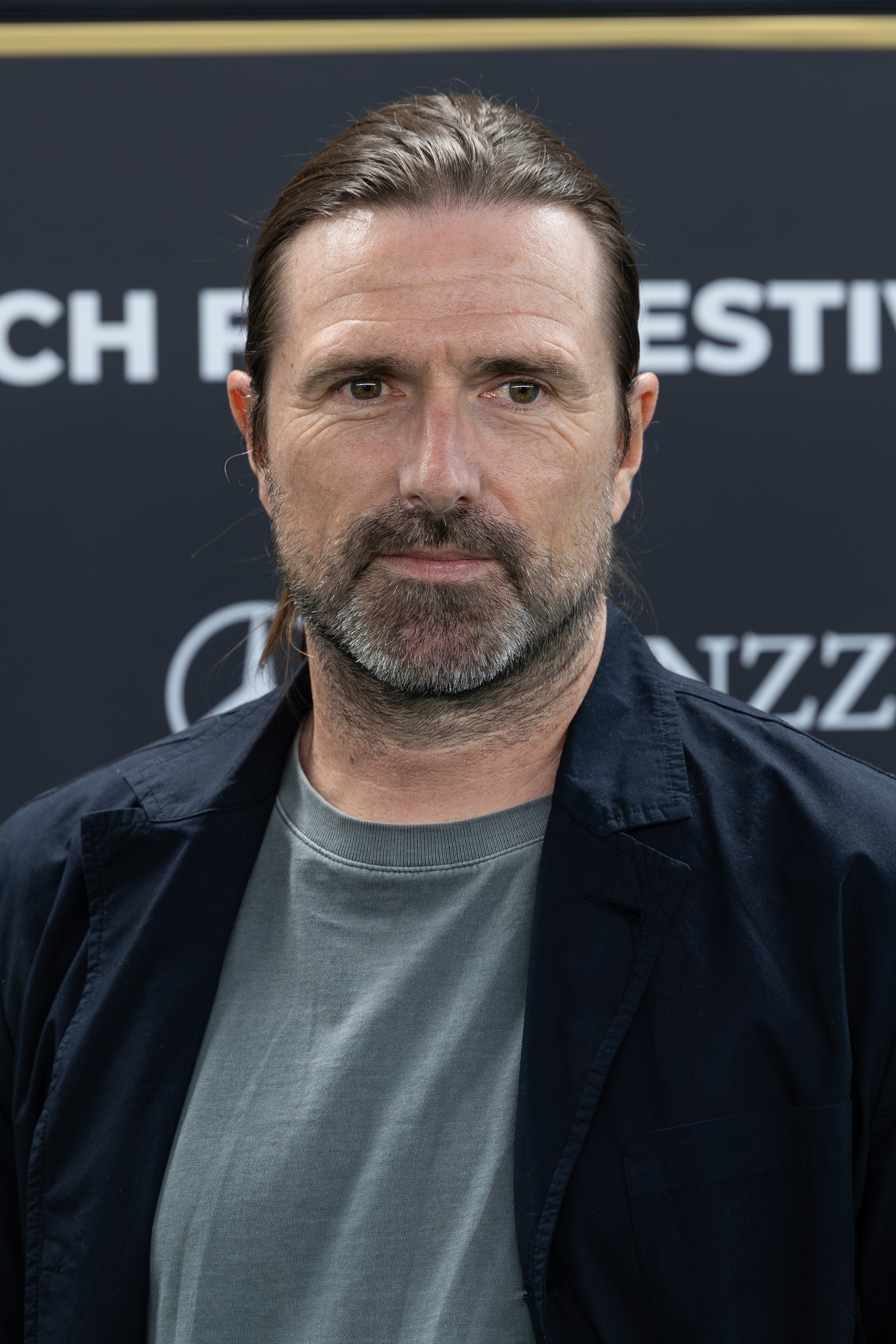
- David Michôd on the Green Carpet at the 2025 Zurich Film Festival.
- Born: 1972 (age 53–54); Sydney, New South Wales, Australia
- Education: University of Melbourne (B. A.); VCA Film and Television School
- Occupations: Filmmaker; actor
- Years active: 2000–present
- Partner: Mirrah Foulkes

David Michôd (/ˈmɪʃoʊ/ MISH-oh; born 1972) is an Australian film director, screenwriter, producer, and actor. He is best known for directing the critically acclaimed crime drama Animal Kingdom (2010) and dystopian drama The Rover (2014). He also co-wrote Hesher (2010). He is the co-founder of the production collective Blue-Tongue Films.

== Early life and education ==
David Michôd was born in 1972 in Sydney, New South Wales. He was educated at Sydney Grammar School before doing an arts degree at the University of Melbourne.

After working for the Victorian Department of Education for a while, he decided to apply for film school while in his mid-20s. He is a graduate of the VCA Film and Television School (part of Melbourne University).

== Career ==
=== Early career: Short films and documentaries ===
Michôd was editor of Inside Film magazine for several years, during which time he made several short films. His first short film to make an impact was Ezra White, LL.B., which he made in 2006. In 2007, Michôd's short film Crossbow, a coming-of-age drama was premiered at the Venice Film Festival and received positive response from critics. Afterwards, the film competed at number of film festivals and earned good reviews. The film also screened at Sundance Film Festival and won the Australian Film Institute Award for Best Screenplay in a Short Film.

In 2008, Michôd directed another short film, Netherland Dwarf, which also screened at Sundance Film Festival and Berlin International Film Festival and earned positive reviews from critics. The same year, Michôd co-directed Solo, a documentary film with Jennifer Peedom. It depicts the fatal journey of Australian adventurer Andrew McAuley, who went on a solo kayak crossing from Tasmania to New Zealand. The documentary received a positive response upon release, with Empire rating the film five stars: "As a tribute to a man – and man's – insatiable search for adventure, it's unforgettable." In 2009, Michôd directed Inside the Square, a 30-minute behind-the-scenes documentary on the making of 2008 film The Square directed by Nash Edgerton.

=== Feature films ===
==== Animal Kingdom ====
In 2010, he released his first feature film, Animal Kingdom. The film was widely acclaimed by critics and received several awards and nominations. Dave Calhoun from Time Out compared him to Martin Scorsese saying that "He brings a big dose of Scorsese to Melbourne in telling of a fictional crime family." J.R. Jones of Chicago Reader praised Michôd''s director saying "Writer-director David Michôd creates a densely textured moral universe that makes good on his metaphoric title." Bill Goodykoontz of The Arizona Republic said that "The naturalistic style Michôd employs adds to the sense of dread. Is there no way out of this existence?" The film became the third highest-grossing Australian film at the Australian box office in 2010, with a worldwide box office gross of US$5,775,563.

==== The Rover ====
Michôd's next film, The Rover, was a futuristic Western starring Guy Pearce and Robert Pattinson. Filming began on 29 January 2013 in Southern Flinders Ranges in Australia and ended on 16 March 2013 in Marree, north of Adelaide. The film premiered out of competition in the Midnight Screenings section at the 2014 Cannes Film Festival on 18 May 2014. Todd McCarthy of The Hollywood Reporter said "David Michod's follow-up to his internationally successful debut with the Melbourne gangster saga Animal Kingdom is equally murderous but more pared down to basics, as desperate men enact a survival-of-the-meanest scenario in an economically gutted world reduced to Old West outlaw behavior." The film had a limited release on 13 June 2014 in New York City and Los Angeles before expanding nationwide on 20 June 2014 in the United States.

==== War Machine ====
On 14 April 2014 it was announced that Michôd would write and direct The Operators, based on the 2011 bestseller of the same name by Michael Hastings. The film will be jointly produced by Plan B Entertainment, New Regency and RatPac Entertainment, with Brad Pitt attached to star. It was later retitled War Machine. In March 2017, Netflix released a teaser trailer for the film in which Brad Pitt plays a thinly veiled version of Stanley A. McChrystal. Hastings also wrote the Rolling Stone article that revealed the friction between McChrystal's staff and then President Barack Obama's and which ultimately led to McChrystal losing his job. The film was released on Netflix on 26 May 2017 and was met with mixed reviews.

==== The King ====
In an interview in 2013, it was revealed that Joel Edgerton and Michôd had co-written The King, an adaptation for Warner Bros. Pictures of three Shakespeare's plays : Henry IV, Part 1, Henry IV, Part 2, and Henry V. In February 2018, it was announced that Timothée Chalamet had been cast in the titular role, with Plan B Entertainment and Blue-Tongue Films, set to produce. Principal photography began on 1 June 2018 in London. The film premiered on Netflix on 1 November 2019.

==== Christy ====
In May 2024, it was announced that a biographical film about the former professional boxer Christy Martin was in production, with Michôd set to direct, and a screenplay written by Michôd and Mirrah Foulkes. The film stars Sydney Sweeney, Ben Foster, Merritt Weaver, Katy O'Brian, Ethan Embry, and Chad L. Coleman. It chronicles the rise of Martin (Sweeney) to become America's best-known female boxer in the 1990s, and later her coach-turned-husband's 2010 attempted murder of her. The film had its world premiere at the Toronto International Film Festival on 5 September 2025. Michôd and Foulkes were shortlisted for the Betty Roland Prize for Scriptwriting at the 2026 NSW Premier's Literary Awards, for Christy.

== Influences ==
In the 2012 Sight & Sound Poll of the greatest films of all time Michôd chose Apocalypse Now, Alien, The Assassination of Jesse James by the Coward Robert Ford, Funny Games, Magnolia, Network, Sunset Blvd., The Thin Red Line, Taxi Driver and Werckmeister Harmonies as his top ten picks.

== Filmography ==
=== Film ===
Short film

Year	Title	Director	Writer
2000	Noise	No	Yes
2005	The IF Thing	No	Yes
2006	Ezra White, LL.B.	Yes	Yes
2007	Crossbow	Yes	Yes
2007	Spider	No	Yes
2008	I Love Sarah Jane	No	Yes
2008	Netherland Dwarf	Yes	Yes
2008	Solo	Yes	No
2009	Inside the Square	Yes	No
2011	Bear	No	Yes

Producer

- Dumpy Goes to the Big Smoke (2012)

Feature film

Key
†	Denotes films that have not yet been released

Year	Title	Director	Writer	Producer
2010	Animal Kingdom	Yes	Yes	No
2010	Hesher	No	Yes	No
2014	The Rover	Yes	Yes	Yes
2017	War Machine	Yes	Yes	No
2019	The King	Yes	Yes	Yes
2025	Christy	Yes	Yes	Yes
2026	Wicker	No	No	Yes
TBA	Wizards! †	Yes	Yes	No

==== Acting roles ====
Year	Title	Role
2000	Noise	Dave
2005	The IF Thing	Editor – IF Magazine
2006	Kenny	Nurse 2
2007	Crossbow	Narrator / lounge
2007	Spider	Hit Driver
2007	Little Deaths	Nathan
2008	The List	Detective
2010	Animal Kingdom	Reporter
2013	The Captain	Dead Body

=== Television ===
Year	Title	Director	Writer	Executive producer	Notes
2007	Dangerous	No	Yes	No	Episode 5
2013	Enlightened	Yes	No	No	Episode "No Doubt"
2015	Flesh and Bone	Yes	No	No	Episode "Bulling Through"
2016-2022	Animal Kingdom	No	No	Yes	
2017	Doc World	Yes	No	No	Episode "Kayak"
2019	Catch-22	No	Yes	Yes	Miniseries

==== Acting roles ====
Year	Title	Role	Notes
2000	Eugénie Sandler P.I.	Trevor	Episode 10
2008	Hammer Bay	Missing Persons Detective	TV movie
2018	Mr Inbetween	Peter	

== Recurring collaborators ==
This chart lists every actor who has appeared in more than one film directed by Michôd. Anthony Hayes, Joel Edgerton, and Mirrah Foulkes are Michôd's most frequent collaborators, with Hayes and Edgerton each having appeared in four and Foulkes in five of his films.

Actor	Ezra White, LL.B.	Crossbow	Netherland Dwarf	Inside the Square	Animal Kingdom	The Rover	War Machine	The King	Christy	Wizards!	Total
Dan Wyllie	X mark				X mark		X mark				2
Mirrah Foulkes	X mark	X mark	X mark		X mark		X mark				5
Joel Edgerton		X mark		X mark	X mark			X mark			4
Justin Rosniak			X mark		X mark		X mark				3
Anthony Hayes				X mark	X mark	X mark	X mark				4
Nash Edgerton				X mark		X mark					2
Guy Pearce					X mark	X mark					2
Susan Prior					X mark	X mark					2
Ben Mendelsohn					X mark			X mark			2
Scoot McNairy						X mark	X mark				2
Robert Pattinson						X mark		X mark			2
Sean Harris								X mark		X mark	2

== Awards and nominations ==
- David Michôd was honored along with Joel Edgerton and Teresa Palmer for their work in international roles with the coveted 2011 Australians in Film Breakthrough Award.

Year	Award	Category	Nominated work	Result	Ref.
2000	Tropfest	Best Screenplay (with Christopher Benz, Peter Curry, Louise Gartland and Sally Isaac)	Noise	Won	
2007	Melbourne International Film Festival	Film Victoria Erwin Rado Award for Best Australian Short Film	Crossbow	Won	
2007	Australian Film Institute Awards (AFI)	Best Screenplay in a Short Film	Crossbow	Won	
2007	Fitz Best Short film Awards	Best Film (with Angie Fielder and Polly Staniford)	Crossbow	Won	
2008	Flickerfest film festival	Best Director	Crossbow	Won	
2009	Flickerfest film festival	Best Australian Short Film (with Angie Fielder and Polly Staniford)	Netherland Dwarf	Won	
2009	Aspen Shortsfest	Best Drama	Netherland Dwarf	Won	
2009	Banff Mountain Film Festival	Best Film (with Jennifer Peedom)	Solo	Won	
2009	Festival du Film Voyage & Adventure, Montreal Canada	Grand Prix (with Jennifer Peedom)	Solo	Won	
2009	Vancouver International Mountain Film Festival	Grand Jury Prize (with Jennifer Peedom)	Solo	Won	
2009	Hory a Mesto Festival in Slovakia	Grand Prize (with Jennifer Peedom)	Solo	Won	
2010	Edinburgh Mountain Film Festival	Best Film (with Jennifer Peedom)	Solo	Won	
2010	Prague International film festival	Grand Prix (with Jennifer Peedom)	Solo	Won	
2010	Australian Directors Guild	Best direction in a stand-alone documentary (with Jennifer Peedom)	Solo	Won	
2010	Australian Directors Guild	Best Direction in a Feature Film	Animal Kingdom	Won	
2010	Satellite Awards	Best Director	Animal Kingdom	Nominated	
2010	Film Critics Circle of Australia	Best Director	Animal Kingdom	Won	
2010	Film Critics Circle of Australia	Best Screenplay (Original)	Animal Kingdom	Won	
2010	Australian Writers' Guild	Major Award	Animal Kingdom	Won	
2010	Australian Writers' Guild	Feature Film Screenplay (Original)	Animal Kingdom	Won	
2010	Boston Society of Film Critics Awards	Best New Filmmaker Runner-up	Animal Kingdom	Nominated	
2010	New York Film Critics Circle	Best First Film	Animal Kingdom	Won	
2010	Sundance Film Festival	World Cinema Jury Prize: Dramatic	Animal Kingdom	Won	
2010	Stockholm International Film Festival	Best Screenplay	Animal Kingdom	Won	
2010	Inside Film Awards	Best Director	Animal Kingdom	Won	
2010	Inside Film Awards	Best Screenplay	Animal Kingdom	Nominated	
2010	Chicago Film Critics Association Awards	Most Promising Filmmaker	Animal Kingdom	Nominated	
2010	Australian Film Institute Awards	Best Direction	Animal Kingdom	Won	
2010	Australian Film Institute Awards	Best Screenplay	Animal Kingdom	Won	
2011	ARIA Music Awards	Best Video	David Michod and Flood Projects for Children Collide - "Loveless"	Nominated	
2013	Australian Film Institute Awards	Best Short Fiction Film (with Mirrah Foulkes and Michael Cody)	Dumpy Goes to the Big Smoke	Nominated	
2014	Sydney Film Festival	Official Competition Award: Best Film	The Rover	Nominated	
2014	AACTA Awards	Best Direction	The Rover	Nominated	
2014	Australian Film Critics Association	Best Director	The Rover	Nominated	
