= Greig Fraser =

Australian cinematographer

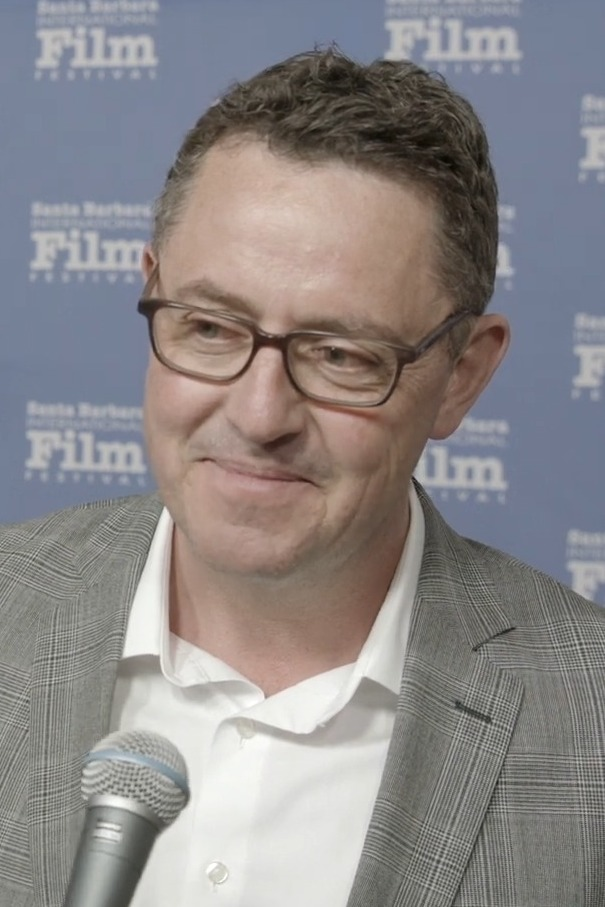
- Fraser in 2022
- Born: October 3, 1975 (age 50); Melbourne, Victoria, Australia
- Education: RMIT University
- Occupation: Cinematographer
- Years active: 2000–present
- Organizations: Australian Cinematographers Society; American Society of Cinematographers
- Spouse: Jodie Fried (m. 2008)
- Children: 3
- Website: greigfraser.com

Greig Fraser (born October 3, 1975) is an Australian cinematographer. He received the Academy Award for Best Cinematography for Dune (2021) and two other nominations for Lion (2016) and Dune: Part Two (2024). He is additionally known for his work on The Batman (2022), The Mandalorian (2020), Rogue One (2016), The Creator (2023) and Project Hail Mary (2026).

== Early life and education ==
Greig Fraser graduated from Luther College in Croydon Hills in 1993. He studied at the RMIT University in Melbourne. Despite forming an interest in photography at an early age, Fraser discovered that videography was perhaps a medium he felt more passion for as he started harnessing his skills along with his first feature documentary as Cinematographer, P.I.N.S., which released in 2000.

== Career ==
For his short film Cracker Bag he was nominated for Best Cinematography at the 2003 AFI Awards.

For his work on Lion, he won the American Society of Cinematographers Award for Outstanding Achievement in Cinematography in Theatrical Releases and AACTA Award for Best Cinematography and received Academy Award and BAFTA Award nominations.

Fraser shot Rogue One on the Arri Alexa 65 large format digital camera and Panavision lenses from the 1970s, making it the first feature film shot entirely with the Alexa 65. Fraser said of working with the Alexa 65, "The images are sharper and have more resolution, and those things are an advantage, but for me it is about the depth of the image -- there is a three-dimensionality to it. Often the beauty came from the texture; we found that the camera excelled when we were filming something with texture; it really enhanced the quality of picture."

Fraser returned to the Star Wars franchise with the 2019 television series The Mandalorian. In 2020, for his work on the series, Fraser won the Primetime Emmy Award for Outstanding Cinematography for a Single-Camera Series (Half-Hour).

For his work on Dune he won his first Academy Award for Best Cinematography in 2022. Fraser said a feature of his work in that film was intentionally using simple compositions, "We tried to simplify the frames as much as we could. By doing that, we've been able to give the viewers that absorption of story and experience" and colour palette: "We tried quite hard to make sure that it all sat within a certain tone."

=== Style ===
Starting on Dune, Fraser has utilized variations of the film-out process, whereby digitally-shot footage is first transferred to film, then re-scanned back into a digital format. Speaking to Filmmaker in 2021, he explained, "What I found with this [film-out] process is that it allowed me to have a clear vision of something that should look more organic than digital, but less organic than film."

=== Critical reception ===
Film critic Glenn Kenny has praised Fraser's work in The Batman and Dune, saying they were a "sort of stunning magic trick". Writing for RogerEbert.com, Christy Lemire said of his cinematography in Dune: "There's both a gauziness and a heft to his imagery. His use of shadow and silhouette is masterful, and does so much to convey a sense of foreboding and tension." Fellow cinematographer and Academy Award winner Roger Deakins praised Fraser's work on The Batman as "extraordinary", and called Fraser's and the film's omission from being nominated in the category at the 95th Academy Awards due to the Academy's tendency to avoid superhero films "snobbery."

Critic Susan Wloszczyna praised his work on Lion, saying it was "visually poetic".

== Personal life ==
Fraser met costume designer Jodie Fried in Sydney in 2004, while they were working on a short film. After moving to the United States in 2008, they were married in a helicopter above Las Vegas. They live in Los Angeles with their three children.

== Filmography ==
=== Feature film ===
Key
†	Denotes films that have not yet been released

Year	Title	Director	Notes
2005	Jewboy	Tony Krawitz	
2006	The Caterpillar Wish	Sandra Sciberras	
2006	Out of the Blue	Robert Sarkies	
2009	Bright Star	Jane Campion	
2009	Last Ride	Glendyn Ivin	
2009	The Boys Are Back	Scott Hicks	
2010	Let Me In	Matt Reeves	
2012	Killing Them Softly	Andrew Dominik	
2012	Snow White and the Huntsman	Rupert Sanders	
2012	Zero Dark Thirty	Kathryn Bigelow	
2014	Foxcatcher	Bennett Miller	
2014	The Gambler	Rupert Wyatt	
2016	Lion	Garth Davis	
2016	Rogue One	Gareth Edwards	
2018	Mary Magdalene	Garth Davis	
2018	Vice	Adam McKay	
2021	Dune	Denis Villeneuve	
2022	The Batman	Matt Reeves	
2023	The Creator	Gareth Edwards	With Oren Soffer; Also credited as co-producer
2024	Dune: Part Two	Denis Villeneuve	
2026	Project Hail Mary	Phil Lord; Christopher Miller	
2028	The Beatles – A Four-Film Cinematic Event (Note: Including Untitled Paul McCartney film, Untitled John Lennon film, Untitled George Harrison film and Untitled Ringo Starr film) †	Sam Mendes	Filming

=== Short film ===
Year	Title	Director	Notes
2005	Lucky	Nash Edgerton	
2005	Stranded	Stuart McDonald	
2006	Love This Time	Rhys Graham	
2006	The Water Diary	Jane Campion	Segment of 8
2007	The Lady Bug	Jane Campion	Segment of To Each His Own Cinema
2007	Crossbow	David Michôd	
2007	Spider	Nash Edgerton	
2008	Netherland Dwarf	David Michôd	
2008	Theo huong den ma di (The Fading Light)	Thien Do	
2009	The Life	Rupert Sanders	
2011	Scenes from the Suburbs	Spike Jonze	
2013	Greatness Awaits	Rupert Sanders	

=== Television ===
Year	Title	Director	Episodes	Ref.
2019	The Mandalorian	Dave Filoni; Deborah Chow	"Chapter 1: The Mandalorian" "Chapter 3: The Sin" "Chapter 7: The Reckoning" (With Baz Idoine); Also credited as co-producer on season 1	

== Awards and nominations ==
Year	Association	Category	Title	Result	Ref.
2016	Academy Awards	Best Cinematography	Lion	Nominated	
2021	Academy Awards	Best Cinematography	Dune	Won	
2024	Academy Awards	Best Cinematography	Dune: Part Two	Nominated	
2016	BAFTA Awards	Best Cinematography	Lion	Nominated	
2021	BAFTA Awards	Best Cinematography	Dune	Won	
2022	BAFTA Awards	Best Cinematography	The Batman	Nominated	
2024	BAFTA Awards	Best Cinematography	Dune: Part Two	Nominated	
2016	American Society of Cinematographers	Outstanding Achievement in Cinematography	Lion	Won	
2021	American Society of Cinematographers	Outstanding Achievement in Cinematography	Dune	Won	
2022	American Society of Cinematographers	Outstanding Achievement in Cinematography	The Batman	Nominated	
2024	American Society of Cinematographers	Outstanding Achievement in Cinematography	Dune: Part Two	Nominated	

Other awards

Year	Award	Category	Title	Result
2009	Chicago Film Critics Association	Best Cinematography	Bright Star	Nominated
2012	New York Film Critics Circle	Best Cinematographer	Zero Dark Thirty	Won
2012	Chicago Film Critics Association	Best Cinematography	Zero Dark Thirty	Nominated
2012	National Society of Film Critics	Best Cinematography	Zero Dark Thirty	Nominated
2012	Washington D.C. Area Film Critics Association	Best Cinematography	Zero Dark Thirty	Nominated
2016	AACTA Awards	Best Cinematography	Lion	Won
2021	Dallas–Fort Worth Film Critics Association	Best Cinematography	Dune	Won
2021	Houston Film Critics Society Awards	Best Cinematography	Dune	Won
2021	San Diego Film Critics Society	Best Cinematography	Dune	Won
2021	Satellite Awards	Best Cinematography	Dune	Won
2021	Washington D.C. Area Film Critics Association	Best Cinematography	Dune	Won
2021	Chicago Film Critics Association	Best Cinematography	Dune	Nominated
2021	Florida Film Critics Circle	Best Cinematography	Dune	Nominated
2021	Los Angeles Film Critics Association	Best Cinematography	Dune	Nominated
2021	San Francisco Bay Area Film Critics Circle	Best Cinematography	Dune	Nominated
2021	St. Louis Gateway Film Critics Association	Best Cinematography	Dune	Nominated
2021	Critics Choice Association	Best Cinematography	Dune	Nominated
2022	British Society of Cinematographers	Best Cinematography	The Batman	Nominated
2022	Dallas–Fort Worth Film Critics Association	Best Cinematography	The Batman	Nominated
2022	St. Louis Gateway Film Critics Association	Best Cinematography	The Batman	Nominated
2023	Seattle Film Critics Society	Best Cinematography (Shared with Oren Soffer)	The Creator	Nominated
