= The Rover (2014 film) =

2014 film by David Michôd

- Theatrical release poster
- Directed by: David Michôd
- Screenplay by: David Michôd
- Story by: David Michôd; Joel Edgerton
- Produced by: Liz Watts; David Linde; David Michôd
- Starring: Guy Pearce; Robert Pattinson; Scoot McNairy; David Field; Anthony Hayes; Gillian Jones; Susan Prior
- Cinematography: Natasha Braier
- Edited by: Peter Sciberras
- Music by: Antony Partos
- Production companies: Blue-Tongue Films; Porchlight Films; Lava Bear Films; Screen Australia
- Distributed by: Roadshow Films
- Release dates: 18 May 2014 (Cannes); 12 June 2014 (Australia)
- Running time: 102 minutes
- Country: Australia
- Language: English
- Budget: A$12 million
- Box office: $3.2 million

The Rover is a 2014 Australian dystopian Western drama film written and directed by David Michôd and based on a story by Michôd and Joel Edgerton. It is a contemporary Western taking place in the Australian outback, ten years after a global economic collapse. The film stars Guy Pearce and Robert Pattinson, and features Scoot McNairy, David Field, Anthony Hayes, Gillian Jones, and Susan Prior. It premiered out of competition in the Midnight Screenings section at the 2014 Cannes Film Festival on 18 May 2014.

The film screened at the 2014 Sydney Film Festival on 7 June 2014, followed by the theatrical release of film in Australia on 12 June 2014. It had a limited release on 13 June 2014 in New York City and Los Angeles before expanding wide on 20 June 2014 in the United States.

The film earned seven nominations at the 4th AACTA Awards: Best Direction, Best Lead Actor for Guy Pearce, Best Supporting Actor for Robert Pattinson, Best Production Design, Best Original Music Score, Best Supporting Actress for Susan Prior, and Best Sound, winning the last two.

== Plot ==
Ten years after a global economic collapse that caused worldwide turmoil, the Australian outback is a lawless wasteland, crime and poverty are common and small military units patrol the outback attempting to maintain what little law and order is left. After a robbery gone wrong, Archie, Caleb and Henry flee, leaving behind Henry's injured brother Reynolds (Rey). While driving away, Archie mocks Rey and Henry attacks him, causing Caleb to crash the truck in which they were riding. When they cannot manoeuvre the truck out of debris, they abandon it, and Archie steals the car belonging to mysterious loner Eric. Eric manages to free the truck and follows them. After a brief chase, Archie stops and Eric confronts them. When Eric tries to attack Archie, Henry knocks him unconscious with a blow from a shotgun butt.

Eric wakes up and drives the truck into town where he wanders into several establishments asking if they have seen the car. He goes to an opium den, where he finds a dwarf and two Chinese acrobats from a traveling circus in the backroom. As Eric follows the dwarf to his trailer to purchase a handgun, the dwarf throws a rock at his chained, defenceless dog. Inside the trailer, the dwarf offers Eric a gun for $300. Eric doesn't have $300, so he abruptly shoots the dwarf in the head and leaves with a gun. After another confrontation with the opium den's owner, he walks back to his truck and finds Rey, who asks why he is in his brother's (Henry's) car. Eric asks Rey where Henry is, but Rey faints.

After seeking help from a shopkeeper, Eric takes Rey to a doctor, who performs surgery on him. The doctor cares for abandoned dogs, which seems to interest Eric. The next day, Eric sees two vehicles approaching in the distance, senses threat, and takes the doctor's rifle. The occupants of the vehicles turn out to be the travelling circus members seeking revenge for Eric's murder of the dwarf. When the doctor's companion comes to investigate, they kill him without warning. Eric shoots and kills the three acrobats, then leaves with Rey.

Eric and Rey stay at a motel in an almost-abandoned town. While Eric is away from the room, Rey loads a snub-nose revolver, then sees an Army vehicle driving down the street. He takes cover behind a bed and hears someone attempting to enter the room from outside. He shoots through the door and is shocked to find he has killed the motel owner's young daughter. Rey is shot at by a soldier. Eric comes to the rescue, killing the soldier and driving away with Rey.

While camping near an abandoned mine, Eric is arrested by two soldiers. At a tiny Army base nearby, he learns he will be transported to Sydney. Eric tells the soldier completing his paperwork that after finding his wife with another man, he killed them both. He is angry that the authorities seemed not to notice or care. The soldier ignores him. Rey breaks into the area, kills the two soldiers outside, then the third soldier who was processing Eric. Eric and Rey escape and later arrive at the town where Henry and the gang are hiding. They find Eric's car outside a house and break in. Eric holds Archie and Caleb at gunpoint, while Rey goes to confront Henry. Eventually Rey and Henry hold each other at gunpoint with Henry not understanding why his brother wants to kill him and at the same time Rey accusing his brother of abandoning him to die. Rey becomes emotionally overloaded and accidentally shoots, hitting the wall. This causes Henry to reactively shoot, hitting Rey in the neck. Eric hears the gunshot and kills Archie and Caleb before walking into Henry's room and finding Rey's body. He shoots a devastated Henry in the chest and then gathers and burns the bodies.

Later, Eric pulls to the side of the road in his car. It is revealed that he was obsessed with finding the car because his dog's corpse was in the trunk. Eric prepares to bury the dog in the desert.

== Cast ==
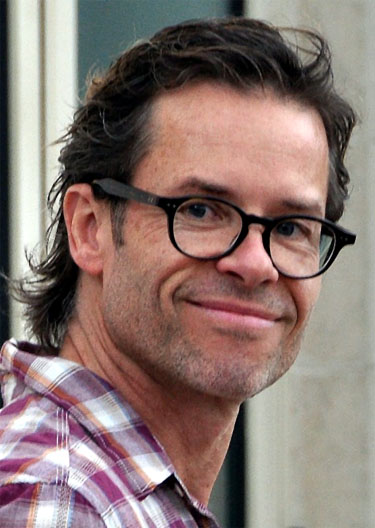
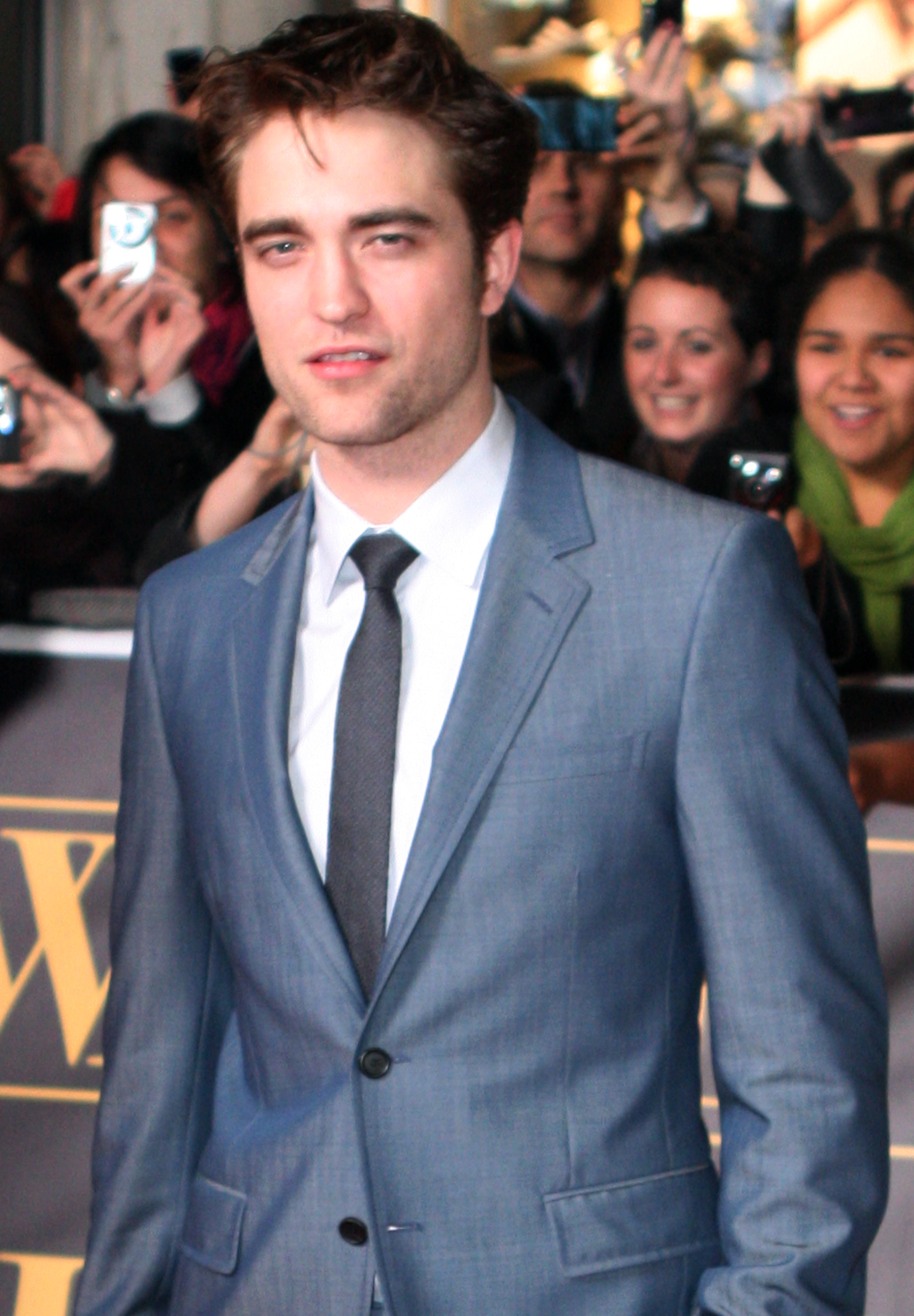
Guy Pearce (left) plays Eric, Robert Pattinson (right) plays Reynolds.
- Guy Pearce as Eric, a violent and bitter former Australian soldier who has lost his farm and his family. Michôd said that "I wanted the character to be a guy who had seen that world collapse, remembered a time when things were different and was carrying around a jaded resentment that was bubbling in a really murderous and dangerous way."
- Robert Pattinson as Reynolds, a simple and naive southern American youngster. Rey is described by Pattinson as "a dependent who has been protected by people his entire life, but he has also burdened them, and he thinks that he can’t really live as an independent person. He’s a little slow, and very, very needy, and he feels like he needs people to look after him all the time."
- Scoot McNairy as Henry, brother of Reynolds and a member of the criminal group who stole Eric's car
- Gillian Jones as Grandma, owner of an opium den
- David Field as Archie, another member of the group who stole Eric's car
- Tawanda Manyimo as Caleb, another member of group who stole Eric's car
- Anthony Hayes as Sgt. Rickofferson
- Susan Prior as Dorothy Peeples
- Nash Edgerton as Town soldier
- Jamie Fallon as Colin
- Samuel F. Lee as Chinese acrobat
- Richard Green as Storekeeper

== Production ==
=== Development ===
"It’s like a new gold rush, where people from all corners of the world have come out to the desert to scrape out an existence. Petty criminals and miscreants and hustlers. The basic story is really quite elemental. You’ve got a really dark, dangerous, murderous person in Guy’s character, and in Rob’s character you have a quite troubled and damaged, but beautiful and naïve, soul."

— David Michôd, director of The Rover, on the film.

David Michôd wrote the screenplay for the film, based on a story he conceived with Joel Edgerton, about the near-future, in Australia a decade after the collapse of the western economy where people from all over the world come to work in the mines. The setting and plot of the film drew comparisons with Mad Max. Clarifying those comparisons, Michôd said that, "You put cars in the desert in Australia and people are going to think of Mad Max, and with all due respect to that film—and I stress that—I think The Rover is going to be way more chillingly authentic and menacing."

Talking about the characters in the film, Michôd said, "There is a strong sort of Asian flavour in the film, but I wanted it to feel like people have come from everywhere, from all corners of the world. Rey is a southern American who has travelled with his older brother Henry to work in the Australian mines. Robert Pattinson and Scoot McNairy are the only American accented characters in the film, but a lot of other accents join them, including Mandarin, Cambodian, and of course, Australian."

=== Casting ===
It is the second collaboration between David Michôd and Guy Pearce after Animal Kingdom; Michôd wrote the character of Eric for Pearce. In May 2012, it was announced that Pearce would appear as Eric in the film. Initially, Joel Edgerton, who co-wrote the story of the film with Michôd, tried for the role of Eric but it did not work out, according to Edgerton: "David [Michôd] and I even at one point were like, because I said to David, 'Should I be in this movie? I don’t know that I’m right for it.' And he’s like, 'I don’t know if you’re right for it either.' Because it wasn’t just some complicated character, Guy [Pearce]’s character. We even decided to go out one day to shoot a scene together just to work it out for ourselves. It was pretty clear after doing it I’m not the right guy for this movie."

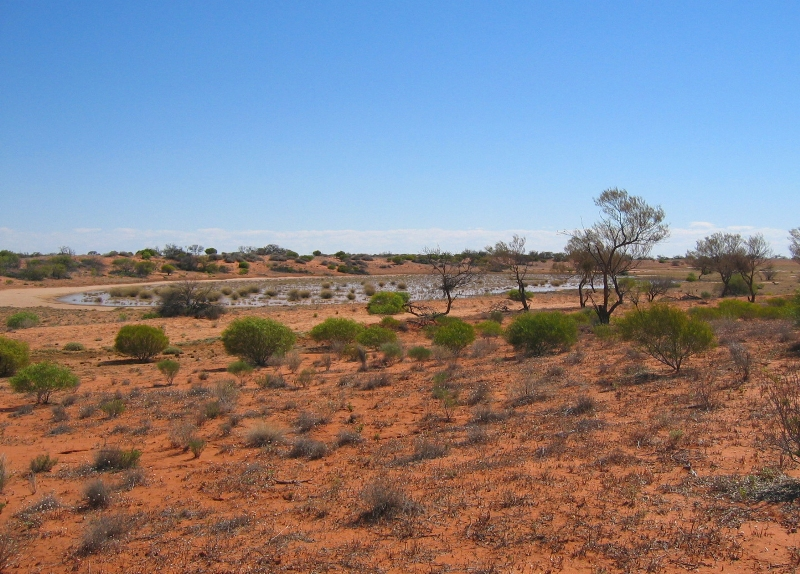
Filming took place at Marree.

Pattinson won the role of Reynolds after audition, over other actors. Michôd commented on the casting of Pattinson that, "(he is) really smart, and not the sort of pretty boy I was expecting. As soon as it was time to start testing… he was my first choice, by a long way." Pattinson in an interview described the film: "It's very existential. It's really interesting. I couldn't really explain to you what it's about but it's sort of about how much pain can the world take and how much disgust and cruelty before love dies. I think that's kind of what it's about."

Michôd used amateur actors from the Australian outback in the film. He said, "You can't meet these people and not think, 'Oh, there's got be a way of getting you in this movie.'"

=== Filming ===
Principal photography commenced on 28 January 2013 in Southern Flinders Ranges, Australia. Filming continued over seven weeks in Hammond, Quorn, Copley, and Leigh Creek, ending on 16 March 2013 in Marree, north of Adelaide, Australia.

Producers Watts and Linde commended the enthusiasm of the cast; they said of the shoot, "The South Australian desert environment can be a tough one to work in, particularly for those coming from a Northern Hemisphere winter but both the cast and crew have thrown themselves into the shoot. We are shooting in some of the most haunting and stunning landscapes in the world, and are fortunate to have such an exceptional cast and a truly talented crew."

== Music ==
Antony Partos composed the score for the film. He previously collaborated with Michôd on his 2010 film Animal Kingdom. Musician Sam Petty, who previously worked with Michôd on Animal Kingdom and Hesher selected the soundtracks and music pieces for the film. The soundtrack album was released by Lakeshore Records in a digital format on 10 October 2014 and would be released in physical format on 14 November 2014.

Talking about the score Partos said that "My task was to build the trust and love between the two main characters despite their circumstances. I think there is a subtle yet tangible shift that develops two thirds of the way through the story and the score does change in this regard to become more harmonically based compared to the textures that are present in the first half of the film."

Michôd wanted to use saxophonist Colin Stetson pieces in the film. Originally he also selected "Don't Cha" by The Pussycat Dolls to use in a crucial scene in the film involving Rey (played by Pattinson) but later changed it to "Pretty Girl Rock" by Keri Hilson.

== Distribution ==
=== Marketing and promotion ===
The first images of Pearce and Pattinson in the film were released on 13 March 2013. On 10 April 2014, a still of Pattinson from the film was released. On 29 January 2014, the first teaser trailer was released, along with the poster of the film. The full teaser, along with a sneak peek from the film, premiered on TV on 30 January 2014 during the 3rd AACTA Awards broadcast on Network Ten.

With the announcement of the film's premiere at the Cannes Film Festival, a full-length official trailer, along with two film posters featuring Pearce and Pattinson, were released on 17 April 2014.

=== Release ===
The Rover was released in Australia on 12 June 2014. In United States, it had a limited release in Los Angeles and New York City on 13 June 2014, and expanded into wider release on 20 June 2014. It screened at 2014 New Zealand International Film Festival in Thrill section on 20 July 2014. It also served as the opening night film at Fantasy Film Fest, Germany on 27 August 2014. It had a theatrical released in UK on 15 August 2014.

=== Home media ===
The film was released on DVD and Blu-ray in USA on 16 September 2014, by Lionsgate Home Entertainment. Bonus features include deleted scenes and a "making-of" segment title "Something Elemental: Making The Rover". It became available for online streaming and digital download through iTunes and amazon on 23 August 2014 in United States. It was released on DVD in UK on 5 January 2015.

== Reception ==
=== Box office ===
The film received a limited release first, similarly like A24's previous releases Spring Breakers and The Bling Ring; it grossed over $69,302 at an average of $13,860 per theatre in its opening weekend, which took place at 5 theatres in Los Angeles and New York City. It had a wide release at 608 theatres and earned $481,214 at an average of $791 per theatre in its opening weekend. It surpassed The Railway Man for the lowest opening weekend of a film in 600 or more theaters during 2014.

The film has earned a worldwide total of $3.2 million.

=== Critical response ===
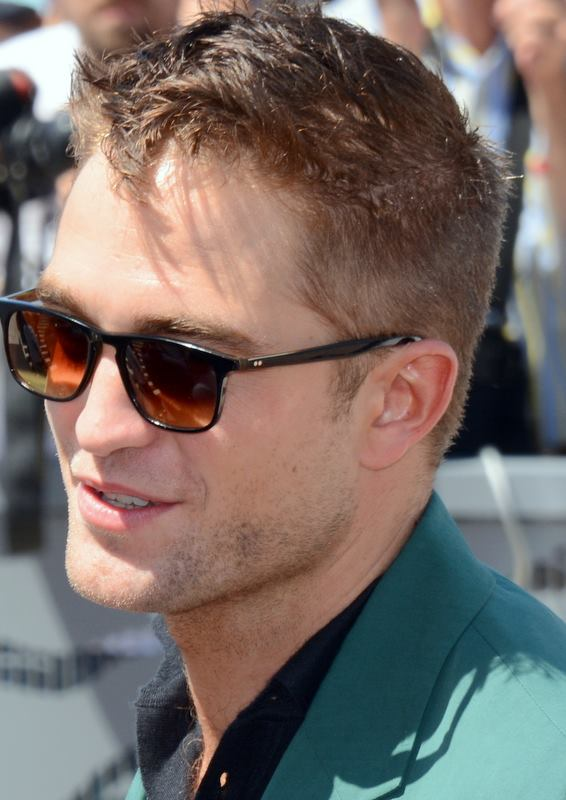
Pattinson at the photocall of The Rover at 2014 Cannes Film Festival

Upon its Cannes premiere, the film received generally positive reviews, and Pearce and Pattinson's performances were highly appreciated. Review aggregator Rotten Tomatoes reports that 67% of 174 film critics have given the film a positive review, and it has a rating average of 6.5 out of 10. The site's summary states: "Fueled by engaging performances from Guy Pearce and Robert Pattinson, the tension-filled The Rover overcomes its narrative faults through sheer watchability." On Metacritic, which assigns a weighted mean rating out of 100 reviews from film critics, the film holds an average score of 64, based on 38 reviews, indicating a 'generally favorable' response.

Kenneth Turan of the Los Angeles Times stated that "The Rover is a most impressive piece of filmmaking, tense and unrelenting, that chills the blood as well as the soul" and about performances said that "Pearce's barely controlled ferocity as Eric is exceptional, but it is not as much of a revelation as Pattinson's unrecognizable work as Rey, a damaged, unfocused individual who is the older man's half-unwilling accomplice". Todd McCarthy, writing for The Hollywood Reporter, wrote that "Pattinson delivers a performance that, despite the character’s own limitations, becomes more interesting as the film moves along, suggesting that the young actor might indeed be capable of offbeat character work. But always commanding attention at the film’s center is Pearce, who, under a taciturn demeanor, gives Eric all the cold-hearted remorselessness of a classic Western or film noir anti-hero who refuses to die before exacting vengeance for an unpardonable crime" and concluded that it is "An intense look into the near future, and it’s not good." Jessica Kiang in her review for The Playlist, grade the film B+ by saying that "Bleak, brutal and unrelentingly nihilist, and with only sporadic flashes of the blackest, most mordant humour to lighten the load, it feels parched, like the story has simply boiled away in the desert heat and all that’s left are its desiccated bones. In a good way."

However, Scott Foundas of Variety said, "Michod’s sophomore feature isn’t exactly something we’ve never seen before, but it has a desolate beauty all its own." Peter Bradshaw of The Guardian wrote, "After a terrific start, the film begins to meander, to lose its way, and its grip." Drew McWeeny of HitFix called the film "glacially paced and intentionally minimalistic."

Filmmaker Quentin Tarantino stated that the film is "A mesmerizing, visionary achievement. The best post-apocalyptic movie since the original Mad Max. With the one-two punch of The Rover & Animal Kingdom, David Michôd proves himself to be the most uncompromising director of his generation."

=== Accolades ===
Year	Award	Category	Recipient	Result
2014	AACTA Awards (4th)	Best Direction	David Michôd	Nominated
2014	AACTA Awards (4th)	Best Lead Actor	Guy Pearce	Nominated
2014	AACTA Awards (4th)	Best Supporting Actor	Robert Pattinson	Nominated
2014	AACTA Awards (4th)	Best Supporting Actress	Susan Prior	Won
2014	AACTA Awards (4th)	Best Production Design	Josephine Ford	Nominated
2014	AACTA Awards (4th)	Best Original Music Score	Antony Partos	Nominated
2014	AACTA Awards (4th)	Best Original Music Score	Sam Petty	Nominated
2014	AACTA Awards (4th)	Best Sound	Sam Petty	Won
2014	AACTA Awards (4th)	Best Sound	Des Kenneally	Won
2014	AACTA Awards (4th)	Best Sound	Justine Angus	Won
2014	AACTA Awards (4th)	Best Sound	Brooke Trezise	Won
2014	AACTA Awards (4th)	Best Sound	Francis Ward Lindsay	Won
2014	AACTA Awards (4th)	Best Sound	Robert Mackenzie	Won
2014	Australian Film Critics Association	Best Director	David Michôd	Nominated
2014	Australian Film Critics Association	Best Actor	Guy Pearce	Nominated
2014	Australian Film Critics Association	Best Supporting Actor	Robert Pattinson	Nominated
2014	Australian Film Critics Association	Best Supporting Actress	Susan Prior	Nominated
2014	Australian Film Critics Association	Best Supporting Actress	Gillian Jones	Nominated
2014	Australian Film Critics Association	Best Cinematography	Natasha Braier	Nominated
2014	Australian Production and Design Guild Awards	Docklands Studios Melbourne Award for Design on a feature film	Josephine Ford	Nominated
2014	Australian Screen Sound Guild Awards	Best Film Sound Recording	Des Kenneally	Won
2014	Australian Screen Sound Guild Awards	Best Film Sound Recording	Marco Arlotta	Won
2014	Australian Screen Sound Guild Awards	Best Film Sound Recording	Rob Nokes	Won
2015	Film Critics Circle of Australia	Best Director	David Michôd	Nominated
2015	Film Critics Circle of Australia	Best Actor in a Leading Role	Guy Pearce	Nominated
2015	Film Critics Circle of Australia	Best Actor in a Supporting Role	Robert Pattinson	Nominated
2015	Film Critics Circle of Australia	Best Actress in a Supporting Role	Susan Prior	Nominated
2015	Film Critics Circle of Australia	Best Production Design	Josephine Ford	Nominated
2015	Film Critics Circle of Australia	Best Music Score	Antony Partos	Nominated
2014	Screen Producers Australia Awards	Feature Film Production	PorchLight Films	Nominated
2014	Sydney Film Festival	Official Competition Award: Best Film	David Michôd	Nominated

== See also ==
- Cinema of Australia
- South Australian Film Corporation
