= The Square (2008 film) =

- Theatrical release poster
- Directed by: Nash Edgerton
- Written by: Joel Edgerton; Matthew Dabner
- Produced by: Louise Smith
- Starring: David Roberts; Claire van der Boom; Joel Edgerton; Anthony Hayes; Peter Phelps; Bill Hunter
- Cinematography: Brad Shield
- Edited by: Luke Doolan; Nash Edgerton
- Music by: Franc Tétaz; Ben Lee
- Production companies: Pathé; Blue-Tongue Films; Film Depot; FFC Australia
- Distributed by: Village Roadshow Limited
- Release dates: 15 June 2008 (Sydney Film Festival); 31 July 2008 (Australia)
- Running time: 107 minutes
- Country: Australia
- Language: English

The Square is a 2008 Australian neo-noir thriller film directed by Nash Edgerton, written by his brother Joel Edgerton and Matthew Dabner, and starring David Roberts and Claire van der Boom. The film premiered in competition at Sydney Film Festival on 15 June 2008 and after that had a limited release in Australia on 31 July 2008, and was released in North America in 2010 by Apparition.

== Plot ==
Raymond Yale and Carla Smith are lovers in a small Australian town living across the river from one another. However, both are already married; Raymond to a loveless wife and Carla to a domineering petty gangster Greg "Smithy" Smith. Ray and Carla plan to leave their respective spouses and run away together, although Ray insists that they delay until he has enough money to ensure a new life together. As a foreman overseeing the construction of a new leisure resort for property developer Gil Hubbard, Ray has been doing underhanded deals with construction worker Barney for the hefty kick-backs which he hopes will eventually land him enough to run off with Carla.

In the meantime, Ray and Carla are forced to conduct their affair in secret, occasionally made awkward by meeting each other at local events and by Carla's dog periodically escaping and instinctively running to Ray's house to meet his dog. One day, after returning home from work, Carla sees Smithy wiping blood off his hands and stashing a duffel bag full of cash into their ceiling; presumably the loot from an armed robbery conducted by Smithy's gang. Carla tells Ray, insisting this to be the end of their financial troubles, and although he is initially hesitant she finally persuades him to steal the money.

Ray devises a plan. He will need to burn the house down so Smithy thinks the money was simply destroyed rather than stolen, a job for which he hires the local arsonist, Billy (Joel Edgerton). Carla will first steal the money from the hiding place and then Billy will arrive and set a fire to make it look as though it was caused by faulty Christmas tree lights.

While the whole town is at the Christmas celebration, Carla sneaks back to the house and takes the money from the duffel bag. However, on return she overhears Smithy phoning his mother and asking her to go to his house (the one Billy is planning to burn down) and feed his dog. Carla alerts Ray who quickly tries to ring Billy, but is only able to reach his sister Lily. With his phone dying, Ray tells Lily to abort the plan but Lily is unable to alert Billy before he leaves. Billy breaks in and sets the fire, unaware of Smithy's mum sleeping on the lounge. Consequently, she dies in the ensuing blaze.

Thus things begin to take a downward slide for Ray and Carla. Lily neglects to tell Billy about Ray's call aborting the plan, causing Billy to think he has been duped unwillingly into murdering an old lady. Smithy, devastated by his mother's death, then discovers that the money had, in fact, been stolen, and begins to search ruthlessly for the culprits. Ray's life is further complicated when someone starts sending him Christmas cards threatening to reveal "what your up to" unless a $10,000 blackmail is paid. What follows is a quickening spiral of murder, suspicion, violence and deceit with shocking consequences for the two lovers and everyone around them. Every time someone discovers something about Ray, they end up dead in some accident caused by Ray trying to stop them. The blackmailer is discovered to be Barney and his wife (who have been scamming people by providing kick-backs and then blackmailing them). Ray goes to Carla's house so they can run off together only to find Billy. Billy demands the rest of his money and Carla gives him the bag full of money she and Ray were going to run away with. As Billy forces Ray and Carla on their knees, Smithy walks in and pulls a gun on Billy. In the fire exchange Smithy is killed and as Ray tries to take the gun from Billy, Carla is shot in the head. Billy leaves as Ray weeps over Carla's body. Ray walks off down the road in shock from the events.

== Cast ==
- David Roberts as Raymond Yale
- Claire van der Boom as Carla Smith
- Joel Edgerton as Billy
- Anthony Hayes as Greg 'Smithy' Smith
- Hanna Mangan-Lawrence as Lily
- Peter Phelps as Jake
- Kieran Darcy-Smith as Barney
- Brendan Donoghue as Leonard Long
- Damon Herriman as Eddie
- Bill Hunter as Gil Hubbard
- Julian Morrow as Dale
- Lucy Bell as Martha Yale

== Production ==
The Square is a neo-noir thriller directed by Nash Edgerton and written by his brother Joel Edgerton along with and Matthew Dabner. Based upon an original idea by Joel, the project was written and then shelved by the actor because he felt it was not strong enough. It was only made after Nash read the script and convinced him it could be filmed as a thriller.

=== Development ===
Joel Edgerton wrote the script in eight years. He said that "I first wrote "The Square" as an idea in my early 20s just, I had notebooks filled with thoughts and ideas about movies I wanted to write, but I never was a writer until I sat down to write a screenplay for Nash. It was this sort of jumbled mess of a thing I was trying to write for him, a crime caper story. As I started writing that, I sort of stopped at one point and started writing "The Square" as a different project with no director attached to it. Then at some point, when "The Square" started developing its first draft and then at subsequent drafts, I eventually did the old Indiana Jones switcharoo and was like, "Why don't we just take this script away and put this one in its place because I think this is a more mature project for us to make." Thankfully, he felt the same and so we basically put our focus into a new thing and that became The Square."

Luke Doolan and Nash Edgerton edited the film.

=== Filming ===
Filming took place in late 2007 at Sutherland, Cronulla and Caringbah the suburbs of New South Wales, Australia.

Brad Shield was responsible for the cinematography.

=== Music ===
The film was scored by Franc Tétaz, with songs written for the film by Ben Lee.

== Release ==
The Square premiered in competition at Sydney Film Festival on 15 June 2008.

It had a limited release in Australia on 31 July 2008, and was released in North America in 2010 by Apparition.

== Reception ==
=== Critical response ===
The film received positive reviews from critics. Review aggregator Rotten Tomatoes reports that 86% out of 85 professional critics gave the film a positive review, with a rating average of 7.25/10 and the critical consensus being: "The Square may not quite live up to the modern noir classics that inspired it, but with twists and tension to spare, it comes admirably close."

Roger Ebert gave the film 3.5 stars out of 4, writing "it never pushes too hard or moves too fast. It lovingly, almost sadistically, lays out the situation and deliberately demonstrates all the things that can go wrong. And I mean all the things." Dan Kois of The Washington Post praised the Edgerton brothers and said that "the debut feature of Nash and Joel Edgerton, Australian actors-turned-filmmakers, calls to mind another great darkly comic debut, the Coen brothers' Blood Simple. Like that movie, The Square uses the trappings of film noir to explore a moral universe in which connivers and crooks are their own worst enemies. And like Blood Simple, The Square suggests an exciting future for a pair of brothers with a dark view of pitiless fate."

Moira Macdonald of The Seattle Times gave the film two-and-a-half stars out of four; however, she criticised the script by saying that "Indeed, there's a bit of everything in The Square, so much so that after a while it starts to feel generic."

=== Box office ===
The Square grossed $321,788 at the box office in Australia in 2008. In 2010, it was released in the U.S. in 24 theatres (spending 105 days in release) and grossed $406,116.

=== Home media ===
The Square was released on DVD with Edgerton's short film Spider on 24 August 2010.

== Documentary ==
In 2009, David Michod released the documentary, a 30-minute behind-the-scenes look at the making of The Square, called Inside the Square.

=== Awards ===
The Square won a commendation in the 'Best Australian Film' category of the Australian Film Critics Association awards for 2008.

Year	Award	Category	Recipient	Result
2008	Australian Screen Directors Guild Awards	Best Direction in a Feature Film	Nash Edgerton	Nominated
2008	ARIA Music Awards	Best Original Soundtrack Album	Ben Lee; Nic Johns; Jessica Chapnik	Nominated
2008	Australian Film Institute	Best Direction	Nash Edgerton	Nominated
2008	Australian Film Institute	Best Film	Louise Smith	Nominated
2008	Australian Film Institute	Best Lead Actor	David Roberts	Nominated
2008	Australian Film Institute	Best Original Music Score	Frank Tetaz; Ben Lee	Nominated
2008	Australian Film Institute	Best Original Screenplay	Joel Edgerton; Matthew Dabner	Nominated
2008	Australian Film Institute	Best Supporting Actor	Joel Edgerton	Nominated
2008	Australian Film Institute	Best Supporting Actor	Anthony Hayes	Nominated
2008	Inside Film Awards	Best Sound	Sam Petty; Rob Mackenzie; Yulia Akerholt; Peter Grace; Michael McMenomy	Won
2008	Sydney Film Festival	Best Film (Official Competition Award)	Nash Edgerton	Nominated
2008	Film Critics Circle of Australia	Best Director	Nash Edgerton	Nominated
2008	Film Critics Circle of Australia	Best Film	Louise Smith	Nominated
2008	Film Critics Circle of Australia	Best Supporting Actor	Joel Edgerton	Nominated
2008	Film Critics Circle of Australia	Best Supporting Actor	Anthony Hayes	Nominated
2008	Film Critics Circle of Australia	Best Screenplay	Joel Edgerton; Matthew Dabner	Won

== See also ==
- Cinema of Australia
- Inside the Square
