= Mirrah Foulkes =

Australian actress (born 1981/1982)

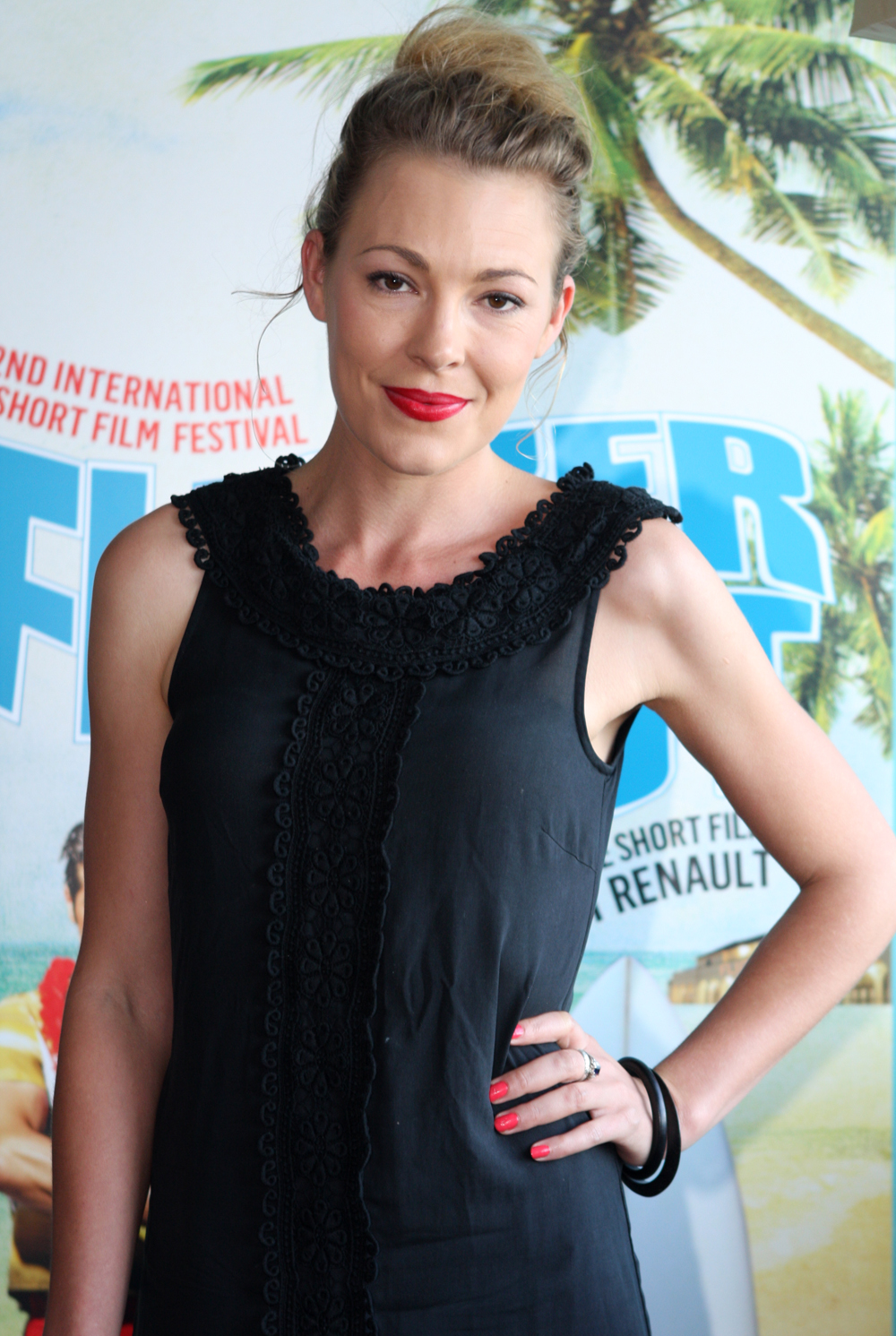
- Mirrah Foulkes in December 2012
- Born: 1981/1982; Melbourne, Victoria, Australia
- Occupation: Actress
- Years active: 2005–present
- Partner: David Michôd

Mirrah Foulkes is an Australian director, screenwriter, and film and television actress. She was raised on the Sunshine Coast, in South East Queensland, Australia. She has appeared in films such as Animal Kingdom (2010), Sleeping Beauty (2011), and in the Australian anthology film The Turning (2013).

In Australia, Foulkes played the role of Jo Mathieson on the long-running Australian TV series All Saints. She appeared in every 2009 episode prior to the series' cancellation in October 2009. In 2013, she played Simone in Top of the Lake, a mystery drama television mini-series.

In 2014, Foulkes joined the cast of the CBS remake TV series Hawaii Five-0 in the recurring role of Ellie Clayton, a lawyer, who is connected to Lieutenant Commander Steve McGarrett (Alex O'Loughlin) through his father.

Foulkes has written and directed several short films including, Dumpy Goes to the Big Smoke (2012), Florence Has Left the Building (2015) starring Jacki Weaver, and Trespass (2015). In 2013, she co-wrote the short film Eugene for the Intel and W Hotels Four Stories competition. Foulkes is the only female member of the Australian film-making collective Blue-Tongue Films.

In 2013, Foulkes was nominated for her acting for the Best New Female Talent at the Logie Awards. Also in 2013, she was nominated for the AACTA Award for Best Actress in a Supporting Role in The Turning, a film based on a collection of short stories by Tim Winton.

== Career ==
=== Film ===
Foulkes has appeared in several Australian feature films since 2006, including Spider (2007), Dying Breed (2008), Animal Kingdom (2010),; the erotic drama Sleeping Beauty (2011); and in the Australian anthology film The Turning (2013).

In 2012, Foulkes made her screenwriting and directorial debut with the short film Dumpy Goes to the Big Smoke, a fictional story about a chance encounter that could change a lonely woman's life. The film received positive response from critics and garnered her several awards and nominations, including winning the prize for Best Director at the Sydney Film Festival and was nominated for two AACTA Awards in 2013.

In 2013, she played the role of Sherry in the Australian anthology film The Turning, starring Cate Blanchett, based on a collection of short stories by Tim Winton. The film was nominated for the 2013 Asia Pacific Screen Award for Best Feature Film, In 2013, Foulkes was nominated for her acting for the Best New Female Talent at the Logie Awards. Also in 2013, she was nominated for the AACTA Award for Best Actress in a Supporting Role in the Australian anthology film The Turning.

In 2015, Foulkes directed the short-film Florence Has Left the Building (2015) starring Jacki Weaver, which premiered at the Melbourne International Film Festival and won the 2015 AACTA Award for Best Short Fiction Film; and Trespass which had its International Premiere at the Toronto International Film Festival in 2016. In 2013, Foulkes co-wrote the short film Eugene for the Intel and W Hotels Four Stories competition. Foulkes is the only female member of the Australian film-making collective Blue-Tongue Films.

=== Television ===
In 2005, Foulkes had a two-episode guest role in Blue Heelers.

In 2009, Foulkes joined the cast of the long-running Australian TV series All Saints in the role of specialist rescue paramedic, Jo Mathieson, in the newly formed Medical Response Unit. She appeared in every 2009 episode prior to the series' cancellation in October 2009 by Channel 7.

In 2011, she featured in Wild Boys as the feisty outlaw Jessie West, a female bushranger.

In 2012, she played the role of Rebecca Bourke in the Australians TV series Devil's Dust, a true-life story about asbestos litigation against a big cement manufacturer James Hardie.

In 2013, she played the role of Simone in Top of the Lake, a six-hour mystery drama television mini-series created and written by Jane Campion and Gerard Lee, and directed by Campion and Garth Davis, which aired on the Sundance Channel in 2013.

In 2015, she played the role of Kellie Norton in the Australian television miniseries The Principal.

In 2014, she joined the cast of the CBS TV series Hawaii Five-0 in the recurring role of Ellie Clayton, a lawyer, who is connected to Lieutenant Commander Steve McGarrett Alex O'Loughlin through his father.

In addition Foulkes directed and was screenwriter for Dumpy Goes to the Big Smoke (2012), and she directed the short film Eugene (2012, short film). and Florence Has Left The Building starring Jacki Weaver, and Trespass which had its International Premiere at the Toronto International Film Festival in 2016.

== Filmography ==
=== Film ===
| Year | Title | Role | Notes |
|---|---|---|---|
| 2005 | Ezra White, LL.B. | Teacher | Short |
| 2007 | Crossbow | Cop 1 | Short |
| 2007 | Spider | Jill | Short |
| 2007 | Long Road to Heaven | Hannah Catrelle | |
| 2007 | Little Deaths | Caroline | |
| 2008 | Dying Breed | Nina | |
| 2008 | Netherland Dwarf | Rebecca | Short |
| 2010 | Happy Sushi | Woman | Short |
| 2010 | Animal Kingdom | Catherine Brown | |
| 2011 | Sleeping Beauty | Sophie | |
| 2012 | Cryo | Jacobs | Short |
| 2013 | The Turning | Fay Keenan | |
| 2014 | Vote Yes | Susan | Short |
| 2015 | The Gift | Wendy Dale | |
| 2016 | Measuring The Jump | Kelly | Short |
| 2017 | War Machine | Captain Barbara Floss | |
| 2019 | Judy and Punch | N/A | Writer & Director |
| 2023 | The Chase for Carrera | Commercial Director | |
| 2025 | Christy | N/A | Writer |

=== Television ===
| Year | Title | Role | Notes |
|---|---|---|---|
| 2005 | Blue Heelers | Deborah Masters | 3 Episodes |
| 2006 | The Chaser's War on Everything | Herself | 6 Episodes |
| 2009 | All Saints | Jo Mathieson | 37 Episodes |
| 2010 | 52 Annual TV Week Logie Awards | Herself | Television Special |
| 2011 | Wild Boys | Jessie West | 2 Episodes |
| 2012 | Devil's Dust | Rebecca Bourke | 2 Episodes |
| 2013 | Top of the Lake | Simone | 4 Episodes |
| 2013 | Deadbeat Dads | Susan | 1 Episode |
| 2013 | The Outlaw Michael Howe | Maria Lord | Television Movie |
| 2013 | Power Games: The Packer-Murdoch Story | Patricia Murdoch | 2 Episodes |
| 2014 | Secrets and Lies | Nicole Hoebel | 2 Episodes |
| 2014 | Secrets and Lies | Vanessa Turner | 1 Episode |
| 2014-15 | Hawaii Five-0 | Ellie Clayton | 4 Episodes |
| 2015 | The Principal | Kellie Norton | 4 Episodes |
| 2018 | Harrow | Soroya Dass | 10 Episodes |

=== Staff credits ===
| Year | Title | Staff | Notes |
|---|---|---|---|
| 2012 | Eugene | Writer | Short |
| 2012 | Dumpy Goes to the Big Smoke | Writer & Director | Short |
| 2014 | Florence Has Left the Building | Writer & Director | Short |
| 2016 | Trespass | Writer & Director | Short |
| 2019 | Judy and Punch | Director | |
| 2021 | Fires | Director | 1 episode |
| 2021 | Eden | Director | 3 episodes |
| 2022 | Upright (TV series) | Director | 8 episodes |

== Awards and nominations ==
Foulkes has written and directed several short films including, Dumpy Goes to the Big Smoke (2012), which won the prize for Best Director at the Sydney Film Festival and was nominated for two AACTA Awards (formerly the Australian Film Institute Awards, also known as the AFI Awards) in 2013; Florence Has Left the Building (2015) starring Jacki Weaver, which premiered at the Melbourne International Film Festival and won the 2015 AACTA Award for Best Short Fiction Film; and Trespass which had its International Premiere at the Toronto International Film Festival in 2016. In 2013, Foulkes co-wrote the short film Eugene for the Intel and W Hotels Four Stories competition. She is the only female member of the Australian film-making collective Blue-Tongue Films.

In 2010, for her acting, Foulkes was nominated for Best New Female Talent at the Logie Awards.

In 2013, she was nominated for the AACTA Award for Best Actress in a Supporting Role for The Turning.

She and co-writer David Michôd were shortlisted for the Betty Roland Prize for Scriptwriting at the 2026 NSW Premier's Literary Awards, for Christy.
