= 2010 New York Film Critics Circle Awards =

76th New York Film Critics Circle Awards

76th NYFCC Awards

January 10, 2011

Best Picture:
The Social Network

The 76th New York Film Critics Circle Awards, honoring the best in film for 2010, were announced on 12 December 2010 and presented on 10 January 2011.

== Winners ==
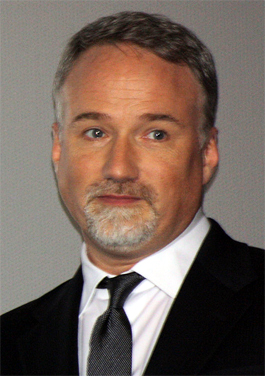
David Fincher, Best Director winner

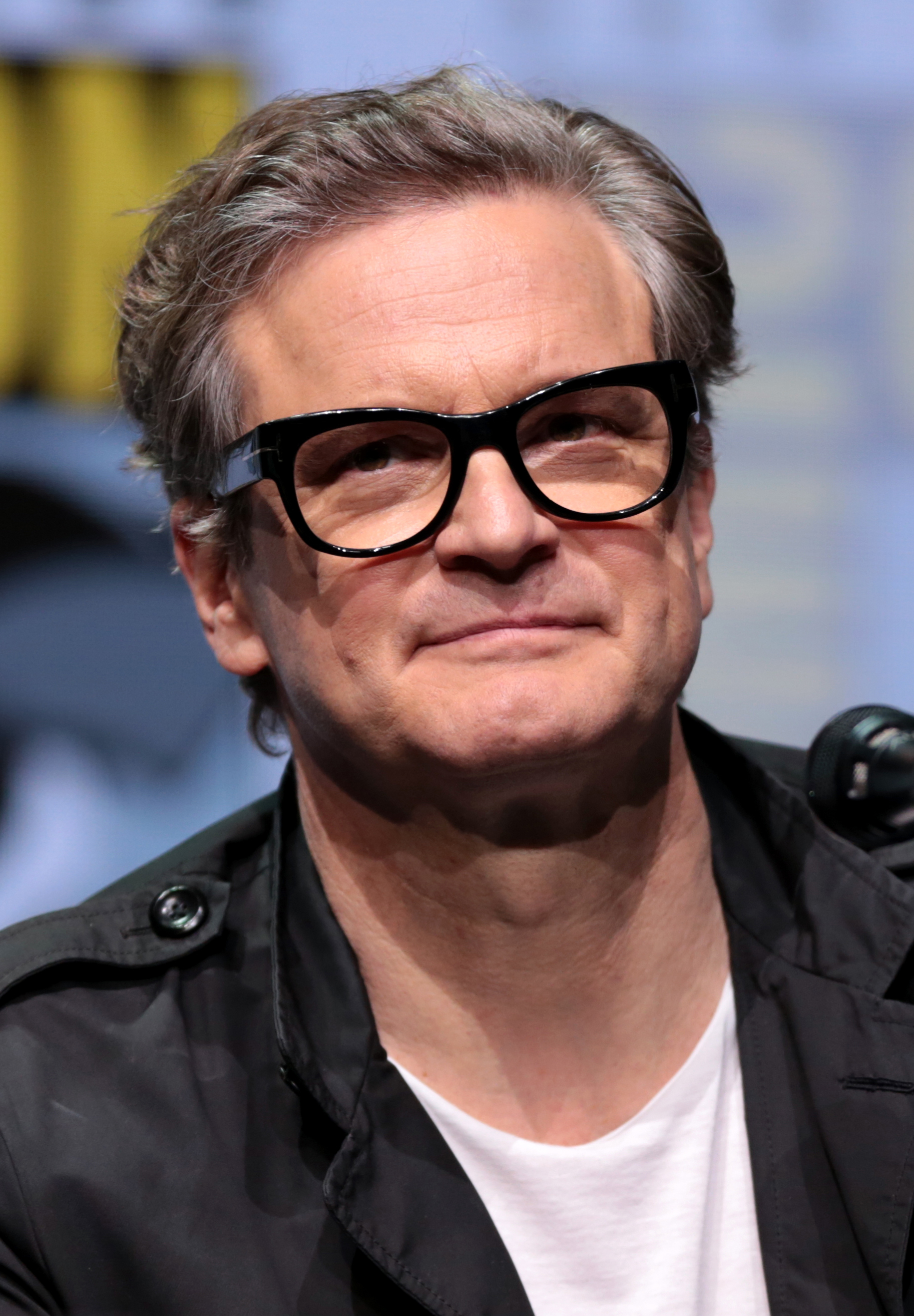
Colin Firth, Best Actor winner

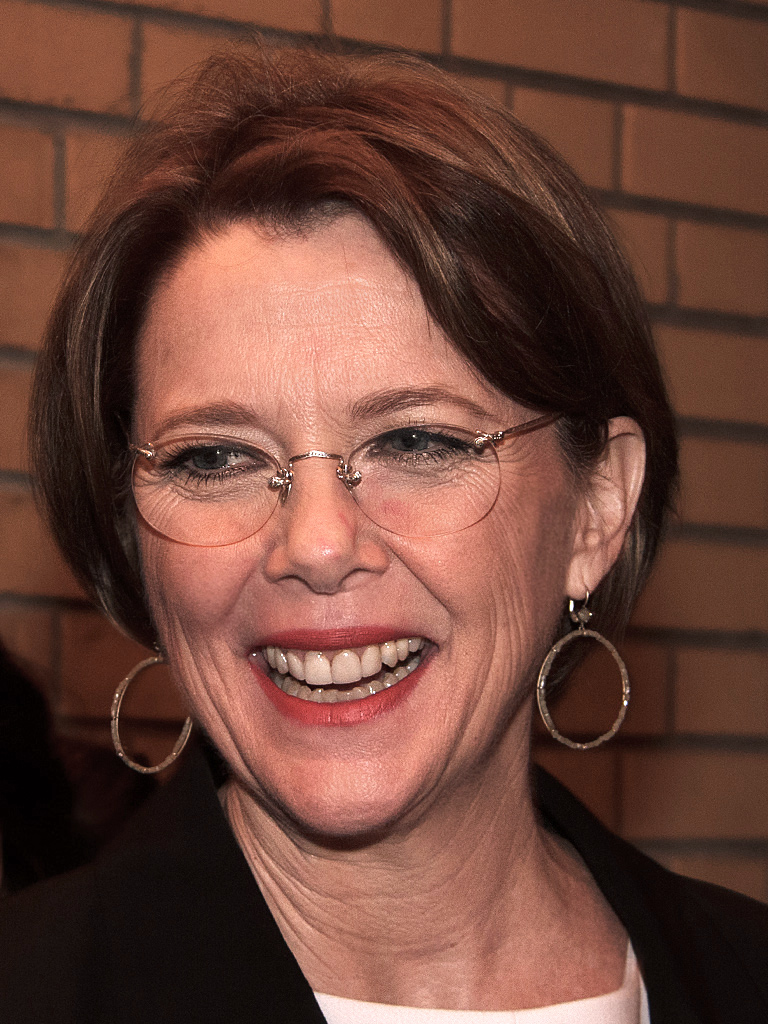
Annette Bening, Best Actress winner

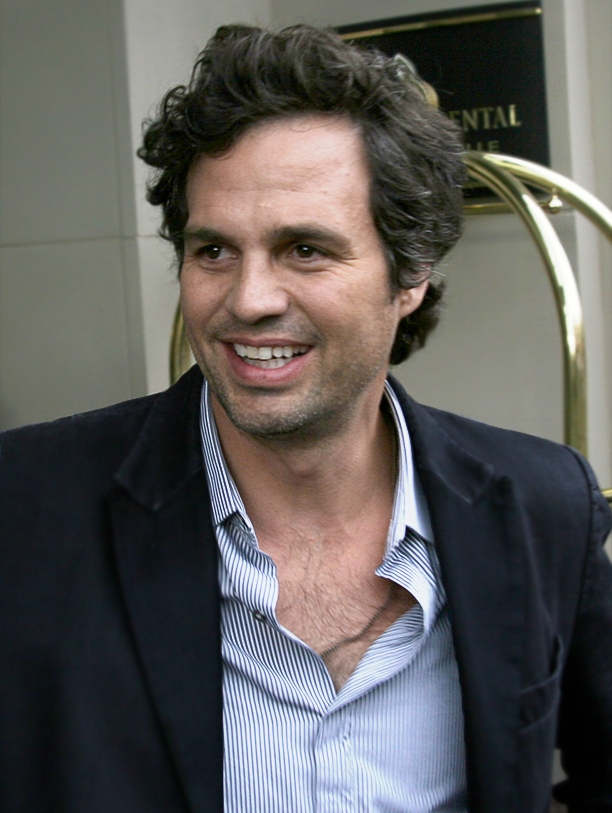
Mark Ruffalo, Best Supporting Actor winner

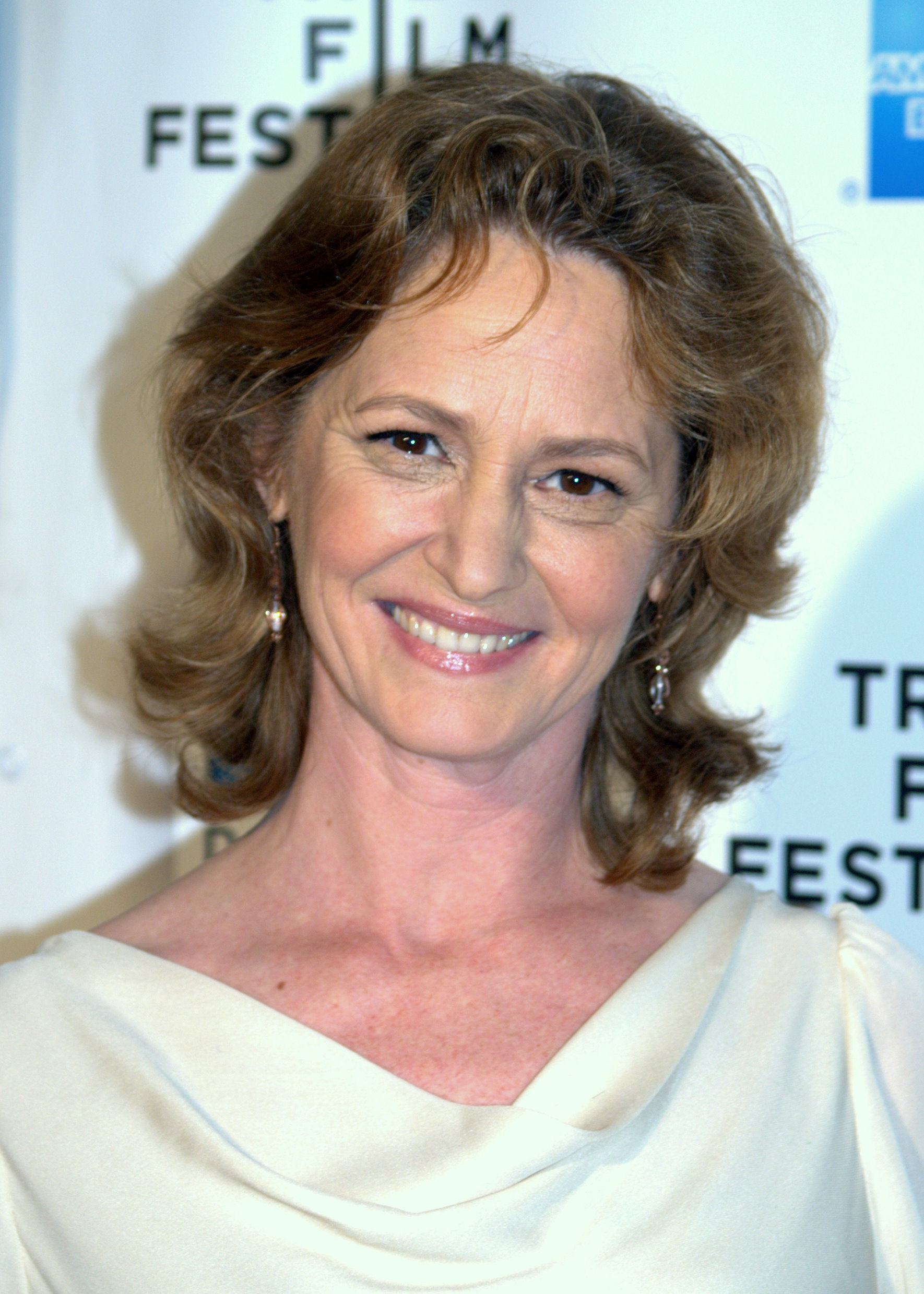
Melissa Leo, Best Supporting Actress winner

- Best Film
  - The Social Network
- Best Director
  - David Fincher – The Social Network
- Best Actor:
  - Colin Firth – The King's Speech
- Best Actress:
  - Annette Bening – The Kids Are All Right
- Best Animated Film:
  - The Illusionist (L'illusionniste)
- Best Cinematography:
  - Matthew Libatique – Black Swan
- Best First Film:
  - David Michôd – Animal Kingdom
- Best Foreign Language Film:
  - Carlos • France
- Best Non-Fiction Film:
  - Inside Job
- Best Screenplay:
  - Lisa Cholodenko and Stuart Blumberg – The Kids Are All Right
- Best Supporting Actor:
  - Mark Ruffalo – The Kids Are All Right
- Best Supporting Actress:
  - Melissa Leo – The Fighter
- Special Award:
  - Jeff Hill
