= Netherland Dwarf (film) =

- Directed by: David Michod
- Written by: David Michod
- Produced by: Angie Fielder; Polly Staniford
- Starring: Jack Egan; Ewen Leslie; Mirrah Foulkes; Justin Rosniak
- Cinematography: Greig Fraser
- Edited by: Katie Flaxman
- Music by: Sam Petty
- Production company: Aquarius Films
- Release date: 16 June 2008 (Sydney Film Festival)
- Running time: 15 minutes
- Country: Australia
- Language: English

Netherland Dwarf is a 2008 Australian short drama film written and directed by David Michod. The film had its world premiere at the Sydney Film Festival on 16 June 2008 and also screened at number of film festivals including Sundance Film Festival and Berlin International Film Festival in 2009.

== Plot ==
Harry really wants a rabbit. Harry's Dad really wants his wife back. They both seem to have forgotten that they already have each other.

== Cast ==
- Jack Egan as Harry
- Ewen Leslie as Dad
- Mirrah Foulkes as Rebbeca
- Justin Rosniak as Pet shop worker

== Filming ==
Filming took place at Monterey, Sydney, New South Wales, Australia.

== Reception ==
=== Critical response ===
Netherland Dwarf has received generally positive reviews from critics, El Vez of short of the week gave film the positive review, stating: "Netherland Dwarf proves once again that sometimes all you need is a hint of emotional resonance to make a captivating and moving short." TGI Film wrote in their review of film, "One of the great things about Netherland Dwarf is the remarkable quality that we so rarely see in short films." Critic Tara Kenny of portable.tv lauded the film for being "simple, sad, sweet and beautiful" she also added, "The emotional resonance of Netherland Dwarf lies in the universal relevance of the familial struggles at its core. With his sweet attentiveness and single-minded desire to own Stampy, the floppy eared bunny, Jack Egan as Harry takes the viewer back to a time when whether to invest in a Hollilop or Netherland dwarf breed of rabbit was easily the most important decision of your lifetime."

=== Accolades ===
Year	Award	Category	Recipient	Result
2009	Flickerfest film festival	Best Australian Short Film		Won
2009	Aspen Shortsfest	Best Drama		Won

== See also ==
- Cinema of Australia
