= Crossbow (film) =

- Directed by: David Michôd
- Written by: David Michôd
- Produced by: Angie Fielder; Polly Staniford
- Starring: Cy Standen; Joel Edgerton; Lisa Chappell; Mirrah Foulkes; David Michôd
- Cinematography: Greig Fraser
- Edited by: Luke Doolan
- Music by: Sam Petty
- Production company: Aquarius Films
- Release date: 9 March 2007 (Venice Film Festival)
- Running time: 15 minutes
- Country: Australia
- Language: English

Crossbow is a 2007 Australian Short coming-of-age drama film written and directed by David Michôd. The film features Cy Standen, Joel Edgerton, Lisa Chappell and Mirrah Foulkes and had its world premiere in competition at the Venice Film Festival on 9 March 2007. After that, the film competed at a number of film festivals and earned good reviews.

== Plot ==
The film focuses on a kid and his relationship with his mum and dad, his problems and struggles, and the neighbour who watches the whole thing unravel.

== Cast ==
- Cy Standen as The kid
- Joel Edgerton as The dad
- Lisa Chappell as The mum
- Mirrah Foulkes as The Cop
- David Michôd as Narrator

== Filming ==
Filming took place at Macquarie Fields, Sydney, New South Wales, Australia.

== Reception ==
=== Critical response ===
The film received mainly positive reviews. Jason Sondhi of short of the week gave film the positive review and praised Michôd's direction and said "I find the elegiac streak that Crossbow mines to be rare and wonderful in film, and kudos go to Michôd, because it is difficult to pull off. Indeed the film is strikingly reminiscent to one of the best films of this vein, Sofia Coppola’s work, The Virgin Suicides, a movie structured very similarly, with its title that undermines suspense, and its observant narration that wrestles with the exquisite sadness of seemingly senseless tragedy, and how it relates to sexuality and nostalgia." Another review for the film also praised Michôd by saying "Michôd seems very close to hitting all the right notes in Crossbow and he seems extremely comfortable behind a camera."

=== Accolades ===
Year	Award	Category	Recipient	Result	Ref.
2007	Melbourne International Film Festival	Film Victoria Erwin Rado Award for Best Australian Short Film		Won	
2007	Australian Film Institute Awards (AFI)	Best Screenplay in a Short Film	David Michôd	Won	
2007	Fitz Best Short film Awards	Best Film		Won	
2008	Flickerfest film festival	Best Director	David Michôd	Won	
2008	Flickerfest film festival	Best Sound Design	Sam Petty	Won	
2008	St Kilda Short Film Festival	Best Cinematography	Greig Fraser	Won	

== See also ==
- Cinema of Australia
