= Spider (2007 film) =

- Directed by: Nash Edgerton
- Written by: David Michôd; Nash Edgerton
- Produced by: Nicole O'Donohue
- Starring: Joel Edgerton; Mirrah Foulkes; Nash Edgerton
- Cinematography: Greig Fraser
- Edited by: Luke Doolan; Nash Edgerton
- Music by: Ben Lee
- Production company: Blue-Tongue Films
- Distributed by: IndieFlix
- Release dates: 17 June 2007 (Australia, Sydney Film Festival); 18 January 2008 (United States, Sundance Film Festival); 9 April 2010 (United States, Theatrical release)
- Running time: 9 minutes
- Country: Australia
- Language: English

Spider is a 2007 Australian black comedy short film directed by Nash Edgerton and written by David Michôd and Nash Edgerton. The film had its world premiere in competition at the Sydney Film Festival on 17 June 2007. After that the film competed at number of film festivals and was later released theatrically together with Edgerton's feature-film The Square.

== Plot ==
A couple, Jack and Jill, are driving in a car. Jill is angry at Jack, so he enters a gas station and buys a card, flowers, chocolate, and a toy spider. As Jill re-fills the gas tank, Jack hides the spider in the sun visor above her seat. Jill ignores the flowers and card but is won over by the chocolate. She pulls down the sun visor, causing the spider to fall out and the car to nearly crash. After the car stops, Jack laughs and tosses the spider towards Jill, who jolts backwards into the road and is struck by a passing vehicle. Paramedics arrive, and as one is about to insert a syringe into the unconscious Jill's arm, he is startled by the spider toy and accidentally throws the syringe into Jack's eye.

== Cast ==
- Nash Edgerton as Jack
- Mirrah Foulkes as Jill
- Chum Ehelepola as Gas Station Attendant
- Bruno Xavier as Gas Station Attendant
- David Michôd as Hit Driver
- Tony Lynch as Paramedic
- Joel Edgerton as Paramedic

== Reception ==
=== Critical response ===
The film earned mainly positive reviews from critics. Jason Sondhi of short of the week gave film the positive review said "It’s for sure a superior film, I just think I loved everything about it except the parts that I assume everyone loves." David Brook of blue print review gave the film four out of five stars and said "A simple one-gag comedy-short that works surprisingly well due to some accomplished naturalistic direction and performances. A nice touch at the end, although unnecessary, went down well with the audience too." Wesley Morris of Boston.com said that "as well-delivered as its shocks are, this film is cleverness in the service of cruelty."

== Home media ==
Spider was released on DVD with The Square, on 24 August 2010.

== Awards and official selections ==
- Official Selection - Melbourne International Film Festival
- Official Selection - Telluride Film Festival
- Official Selection - South by Southwest

Year	Award	Category	Recipient	Result
2007	Sydney Film Festival	Best Short Film-The Satellite Venues (Audience Award)	Nash Edgerton	Won
2007	Australian Film Institute Awards (AFI)	Best Visual Effects	Mike Seymour	Nominated
2007	AFI Fest	International Shorts Competition Grand Jury Prize	Nash Edgerton	Won
2007	Australian Directors Guild	Best Directing in a Short Film	Nash Edgerton	Nominated
2008	Anchorage International Film Festival	Best Super Short Film	Nash Edgerton	Won
2008	Aspen Shortsfest	Hi-Five To Lo-Fi Award	Nash Edgerton	Won
2008	Aspen Shortsfest	Best Comedy (Jury Award)	Nash Edgerton	Won
2008	Flickerfest International Short Film Festival	Best Editing an Australian Short Film	Nash Edgerton; Luke Doolan	Won
2008	IF Awards	Best Short Film	Nash Edgerton; Nicole O'Donohue	Nominated
2008	Indianapolis International Film Festival	Best Short Film (Audience Award)	Nash Edgerton	Won
2008	Nashville Film Festival	Best Narrative Short (Honorable Mention)	Nash Edgerton	Won
2008	San Sebastián Horror and Fantasy Film Festival	Best Short Film (Audience Award)	Nash Edgerton	Won
2008	San Sebastián Horror and Fantasy Film Festival	Best short film youth jury award	Nash Edgerton	Won
2008	St Kilda Short Film Festival	Best Short Film (Audience Award)	Nash Edgerton	Won
2008	Sundance Film Festival	Honorable Mention in Short Filmmaking	Nash Edgerton	Won
2009	24FPS International Short Film Festival	Best Short Film (Audience Award)	Nash Edgerton	Won
2009	24FPS International Short Film Festival	Best Editing	Nash Edgerton; Luke Doolan	Won

== Notes ==
Edgerton directed two follow-ups of Spider, a short film entitled Bear which was released in 2011 and 2021 Shark.

== See also ==
- Cinema of Australia
- The Square
- Bear
