= Boston Society of Film Critics Awards 2010 =

Annual US film awards ceremony

31st BSFC Awards

December 12, 2010

Best Film:
The Social Network

The 31st Boston Society of Film Critics Awards, honoring the best in filmmaking in 2010, were given on December 12, 2010.

== Winners ==
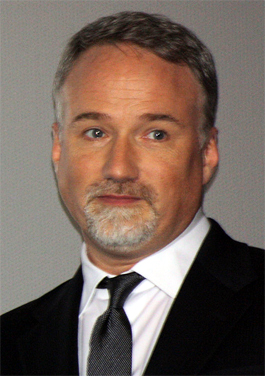
David Fincher, Best Director winner

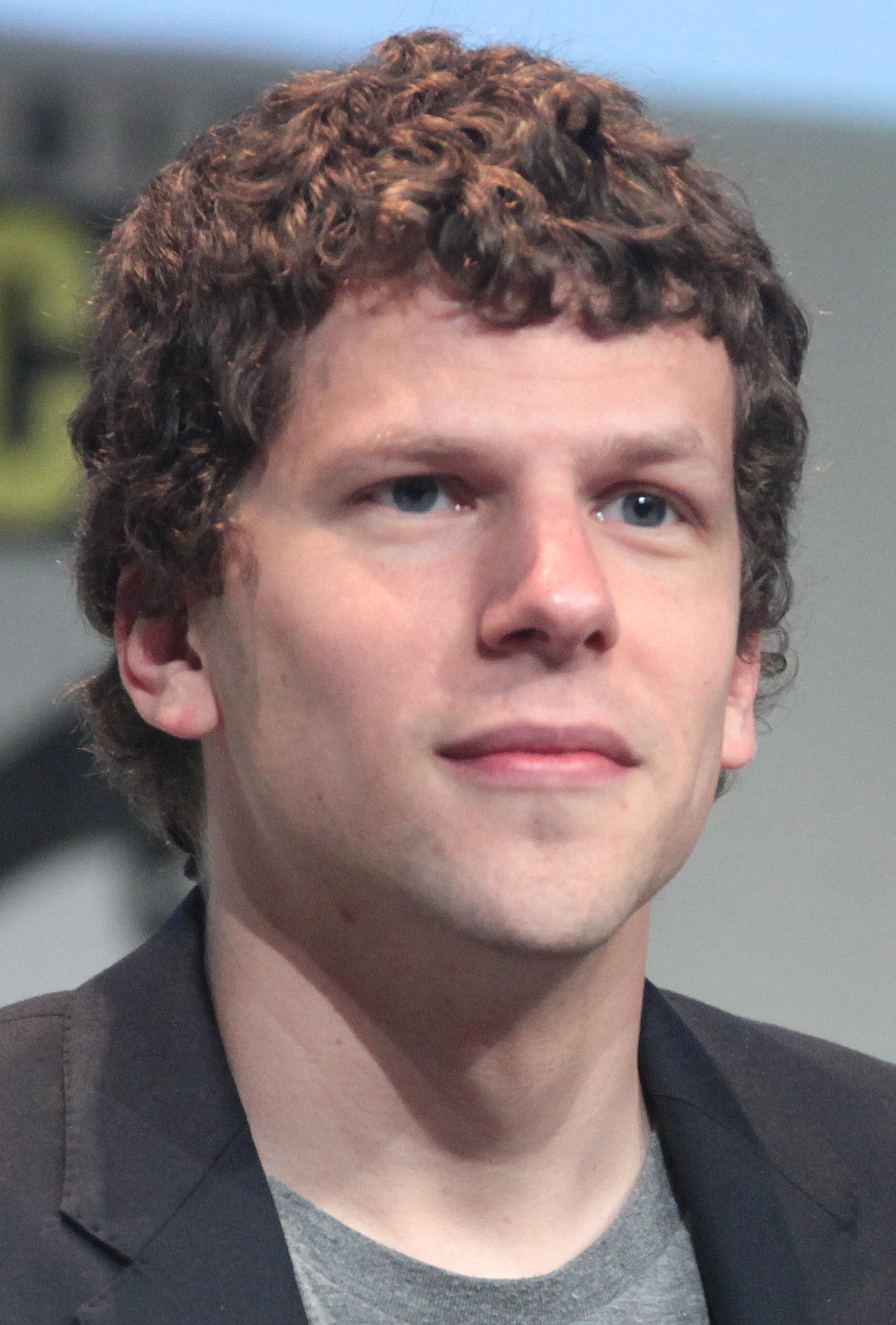
Jesse Eisenberg, Best Actor winner

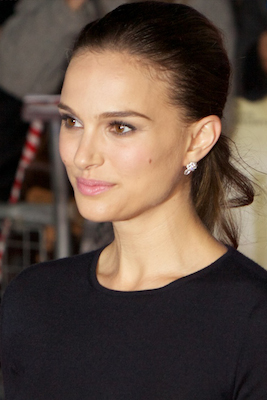
Natalie Portman, Best Actress winner

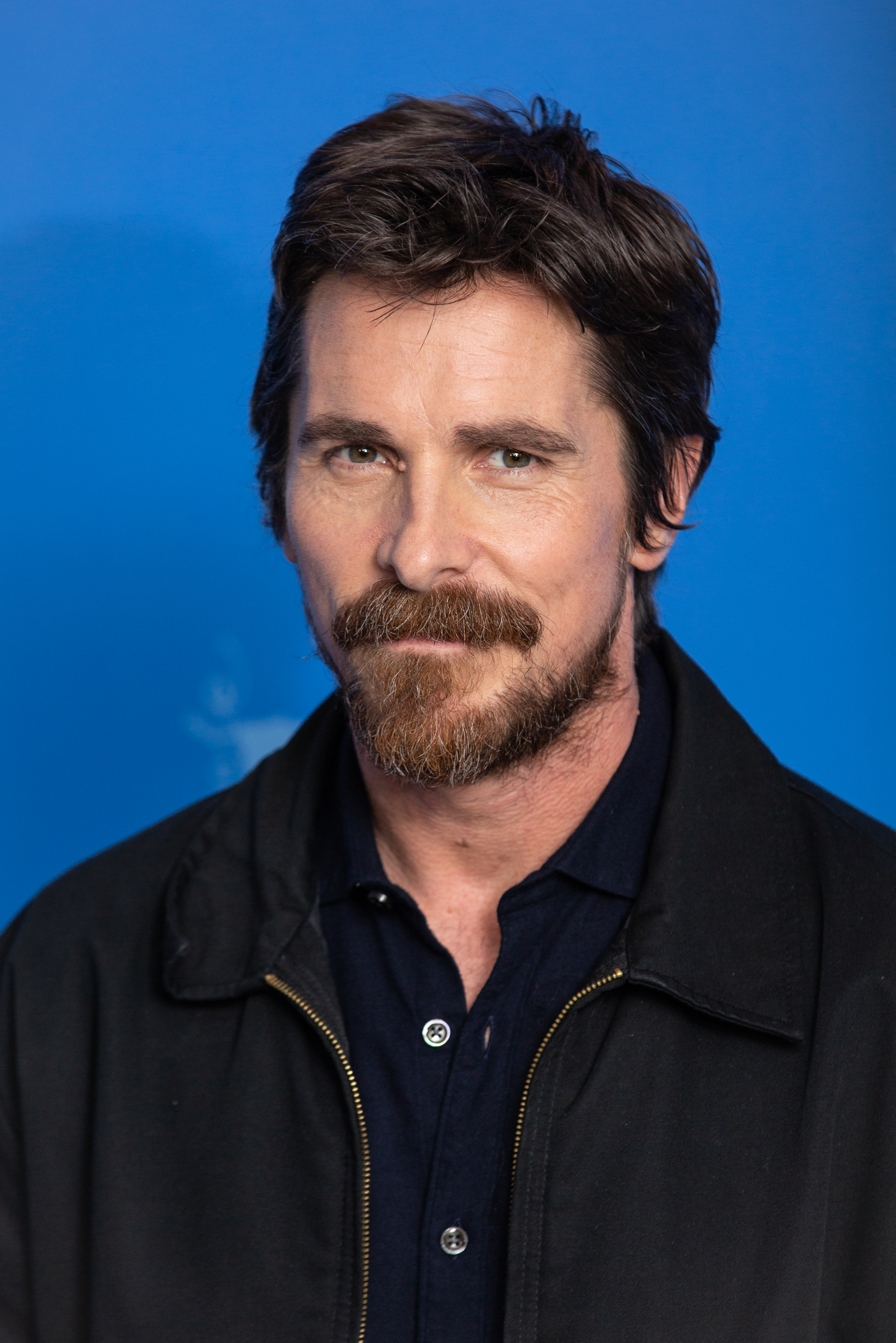
Christian Bale, Best Supporting Actor winner

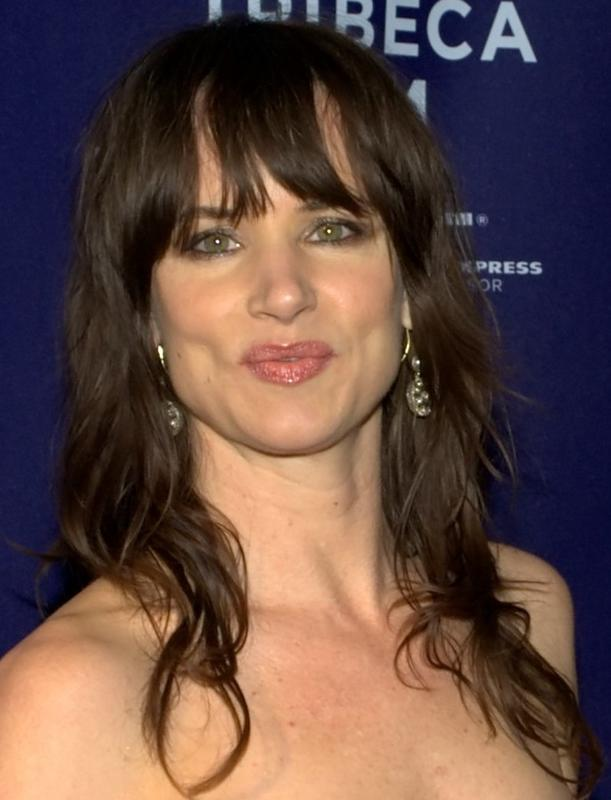
Juliette Lewis, Best Supporting Actress winner

- Best Film:
  - The Social Network
  - Runner-up: Toy Story 3
- Best Actor:
  - Jesse Eisenberg – The Social Network
  - Runner-up: Colin Firth – The King's Speech
- Best Actress:
  - Natalie Portman – Black Swan
  - Runner-up: Annette Bening – The Kids Are All Right
- Best Supporting Actor:
  - Christian Bale – The Fighter
  - Runner-up: Andrew Garfield – The Social Network
- Best Supporting Actress:
  - Juliette Lewis – Conviction
  - Runner-up: Melissa Leo – The Fighter
- Best Director:
  - David Fincher – The Social Network
  - Runner-up: Darren Aronofsky – Black Swan
- Best Screenplay:
  - Aaron Sorkin – The Social Network
  - Runner-up: Nicole Holofcener – Please Give
- Best Cinematography:
  - Roger Deakins – True Grit
  - Runner-up: Matthew Libatique – Black Swan
- Best Documentary:
  - Marwencol
  - Runner-up: Inside Job
- Best Foreign-Language Film:
  - Mother (Madeo) • South Korea
  - Runner-up: I Am Love (Io sono l'amore) • Italy
- Best Animated Film:
  - Toy Story 3
  - Runner-up: The Illusionist (L'illusionniste)
- Best Editing:
  - Andrew Weisblum – Black Swan
  - Runner-up: Lee Smith – Inception
- Best New Filmmaker:
  - Jeff Malmberg – Marwencol
  - Runner-up: David Michôd – Animal Kingdom
- Best Ensemble Cast:
  - The Fighter
  - Runner-up: The Kids Are All Right
- Best Use of Music in a Film:
  - Trent Reznor and Atticus Ross – The Social Network
  - Runner-up: Carter Burwell – True Grit
