= Dumpy Goes to the Big Smoke =

- Directed by: Mirrah Foulkes
- Written by: Mirrah Foulkes
- Produced by: David Michod; Michael Cody
- Starring: Emily Tomlins; Anthony Hayes; Eden Falk
- Cinematography: Adam Arkapaw
- Edited by: Nash Edgerton
- Music by: Sam Petty
- Distributed by: Blue-Tongue Films
- Release date: 16 June 2012
- Running time: 15 minutes
- Country: Australia
- Language: English

Dumpy Goes to the Big Smoke is a 2012 Australian short drama film written and directed by Mirrah Foulkes. The short film is produced by David Michod and Michael Cody and had its world premiere in competition at the Sydney Film Festival on 16 June 2012. After that the film competed at number of film festivals and earned good reviews.

== Plot ==
Dumpy a strange, cat-obsessed figure in a gold dress, who dreams of escaping to the big smoke. When a pleasant stranger appears, needing help to change a punctured tyre, opportunity final knocks.

== Cast ==
- Emily Tomlins as Dumpy
- Anthony Hayes as Portly
- Eden Falk as Handsome Gentleman Caller

== Awards ==
Year	Award	Category	Recipient	Result
2012	Sydney Film Festival	Rouben Mamoulian Award	Mirrah Foulkes	Won
2012	Sydney Film Festival	Best Australian Short Film	Mirrah Foulkes	Nominated
2013	Australian Film Institute Awards	Best Short Fiction Film	Mirrah Foulkes (with David Michod and Michael Cody)	Nominated
2013	Australian Film Institute Awards	Best Screenplay in a Short Film	Mirrah Foulkes	Nominated
2013	Aspen Shortsfest	Filmmaker to watch	Mirrah Foulkes	Won
2013	Flickerfest film festival	Best Direction In A Short Film	Mirrah Foulkes	Won

== See also ==
- Cinema of Australia
