= Bear (2011 film) =

- Directed by: Nash Edgerton
- Written by: David Michod; Nash Edgerton
- Produced by: Lauren Edwards; John Polson
- Starring: Nash Edgerton; Teresa Palmer; Warwick Thornton
- Cinematography: Adam Arkapaw
- Edited by: Nash Edgerton
- Music by: Ben Lee; Ione Skye; Jack Graddis
- Production companies: Blue-Tongue Films; Peachy Pictures; Fxphd
- Release date: 21 May 2011 (Cannes)
- Running time: 11 minutes
- Country: Australia
- Language: English

Bear is a 2011 Australian short black comedy drama film directed by Nash Edgerton and written by David Michod and Nash Edgerton. The film had its world premiere in competition at the Cannes Film Festival on 21 May 2011.

== Plot ==
Emelie is greatly annoyed by her significant other Jack. After she leaves to ride her bicycle along a trail, Jack gets into his car with a box and drives to the trail. As Emelie is riding her bike, she is startled by a bear, and accidentally falls off a cliff. Behind the bear, there are colourful birthday decorations. The bear, revealed to be Jack in a bear costume, rushes down the cliff to Emelie's side. After reconciling with the injured Emelie, he jokingly puts the bear mask back on, and is shot by a bear hunter.

== Cast ==
- Nash Edgerton as Jack
- Teresa Palmer as Emelie
- Warwick Thornton as Ranger

== Reception ==
=== Critical response ===
The film earned mainly positive reviews from critics. Ivan Kander of short of the week gave film the positive review said "Edgerton isn't trying to surprise you—he already pulled off that magic trick once with Spider. Instead, he's reveling a bit in a sort of misanthropic playground. Our protagonist is a cartoon character of sorts—the Wile E. Coyote of cinematic schadenfreude. He's always getting himself, and his loved ones, into the darndest, deadliest situations. And, all the while, we can't help but laugh at his misfortune." David Brook of blue print review gave the film three and a half out of five stars and said "A sequel to Spider, Bear basically replays the gag in a new setting. Predictable of course for this reason, but still funny and well produced." Another critic in his review said that "Reviewing a film this short is going to be fairly similar to reviewing an advert, because with so little time to build character or a world, it essentially comes down to 'did you did or did you didn't like the punch'. In this case, I did, it gave me a legitimate 'I didn't see that coming' moment, upon the fact that it was coolly put together and even pulls of a very impressive stunt. Not one I'll remember for the rest of my days for sure, but an amusing distraction, which is exactly what I think it was designed to be."

=== Accolades ===
Year	Award	Category	Recipient	Result
2011	Cannes Film Festival	Palme d'Or - Best Short Film	Nash Edgerton	Nominated
2011	Leeds International Film Festival	Louis le Prince International Short Film	Nash Edgerton	Won
2011	Strasbourg International Film Festival	Golden Octopus for the best international short fantastic film	Nash Edgerton	Won
2012	Flickerfest International Short Film Festival	Best Direction in an Australian Short Film	Nash Edgerton	Won

The film received an honorable mention in the category "Best narrative short film" at the 12th International Cycling Film Festival 2017.

== Notes ==
Bear is part of a trilogy of short films by Edgerton, consisting of Spider (2007), Bear (2011) and Shark (2021)

== See also ==
- Cinema of Australia
- Spider
