= Joel Edgerton =

Australian actor (born 1974)

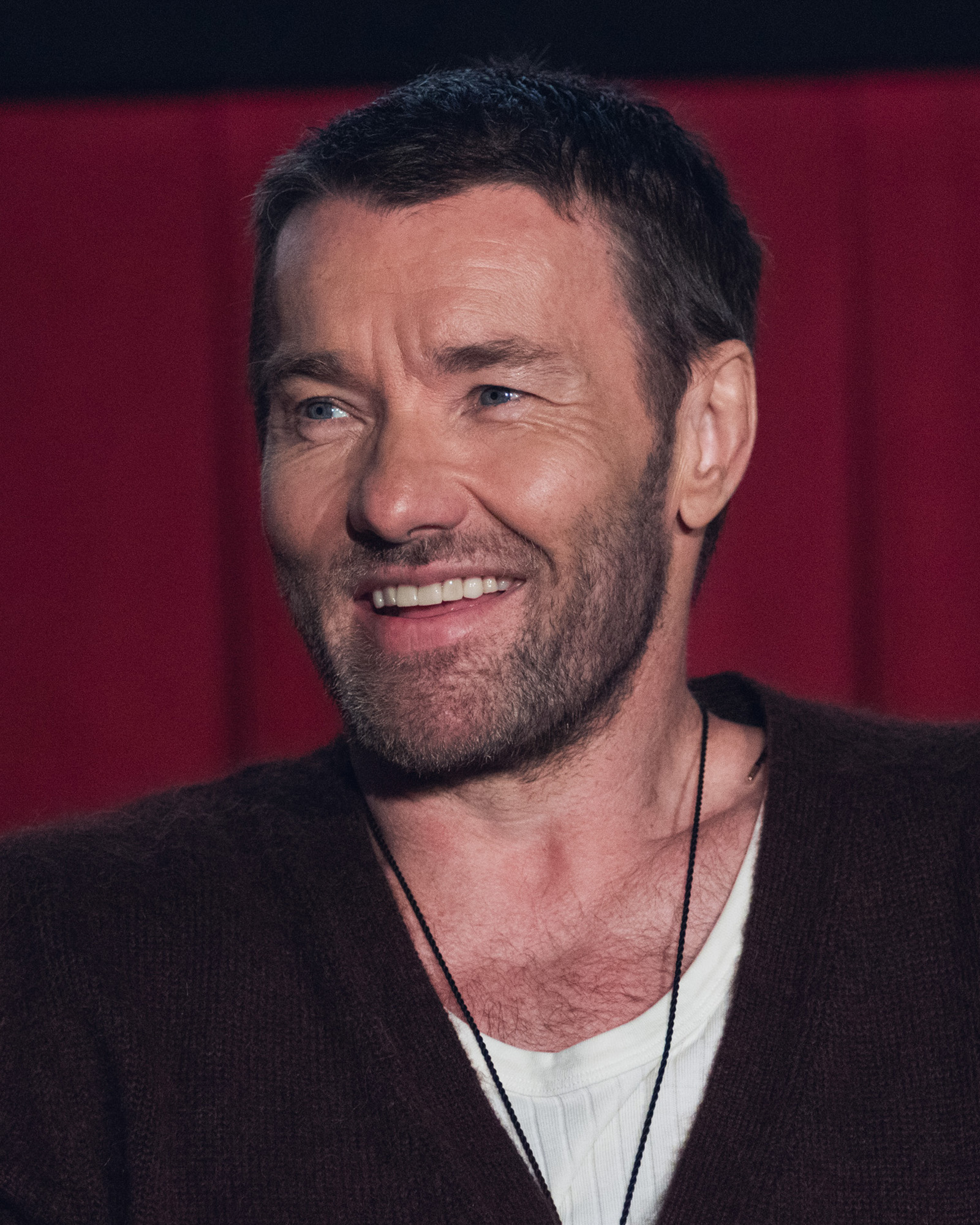
- Edgerton in 2025
- Born: 23 June 1974 (age 52); Blacktown, New South Wales, Australia
- Education: University of Western Sydney
- Occupations: Actor; screenwriter; producer; director
- Years active: 1995–present
- Partner(s): Christine Centenera (2018–present)
- Children: 2
- Relatives: Nash Edgerton (brother)

Joel Edgerton (born 23 June 1974) is an Australian actor and filmmaker. He is known for his portrayal of Will McGill on the first two seasons of the Australian drama series The Secret Life of Us (2001–2002), and for playing Owen Lars in the Star Wars films Attack of the Clones (2002) and Revenge of the Sith (2005), a role he reprised in the Disney+ series Obi-Wan Kenobi (2022). He also voiced Metal Beak from Warner Bros. Pictures' fantasy adventure film Legend of the Guardians: The Owls of Ga'Hoole (2010). For his portrayal of Richard Loving in the 2016 historical drama Loving, he received a nomination for the Golden Globe Award for Best Actor in a Motion Picture – Drama, and a further nomination in the same category for his critically acclaimed performance in Train Dreams (2025).

In Australia, Edgerton won the AACTA Award for Best Lead Actor for his work on The Secret Life of Us. He has appeared in several Australian films, such as The Square (2008), Animal Kingdom (2010; for which he received the AACTA Award for Best Supporting Actor), Wish You Were Here (2012), and Felony (2013). Edgerton's other film appearances include King Arthur (2004), Warrior (2011), Zero Dark Thirty (2012), The Great Gatsby (2013), Black Mass (2015), Bright (2017), The Green Knight (2021), Master Gardener (2022), and The Boys in the Boat (2023). He has also starred in the Amazon Prime miniseries The Underground Railroad in 2021 and the Apple TV+ science fiction series Dark Matter in 2024.

For his work on The Gift (2015), a thriller he wrote, directed, produced, and co-starred in, Edgerton received critical acclaim and a nomination for the DGA Award for Outstanding Directing – First-Time Feature Film. In 2018, he wrote, directed and co-starred in the conversion therapy drama Boy Erased, and the following year he co-wrote and starred in The King.

== Early life ==
Edgerton was born in Blacktown, New South Wales, Australia the son of Michael, a solicitor and property developer, and Marianne (née van Dort) Edgerton. His mother is a Dutch immigrant, who was born in The Hague. He graduated from the Hills Grammar School in 1991. He attended the Nepean Drama School at the University of Western Sydney, before moving on to various stage productions, including at Sydney Theatre Company.

== Career ==
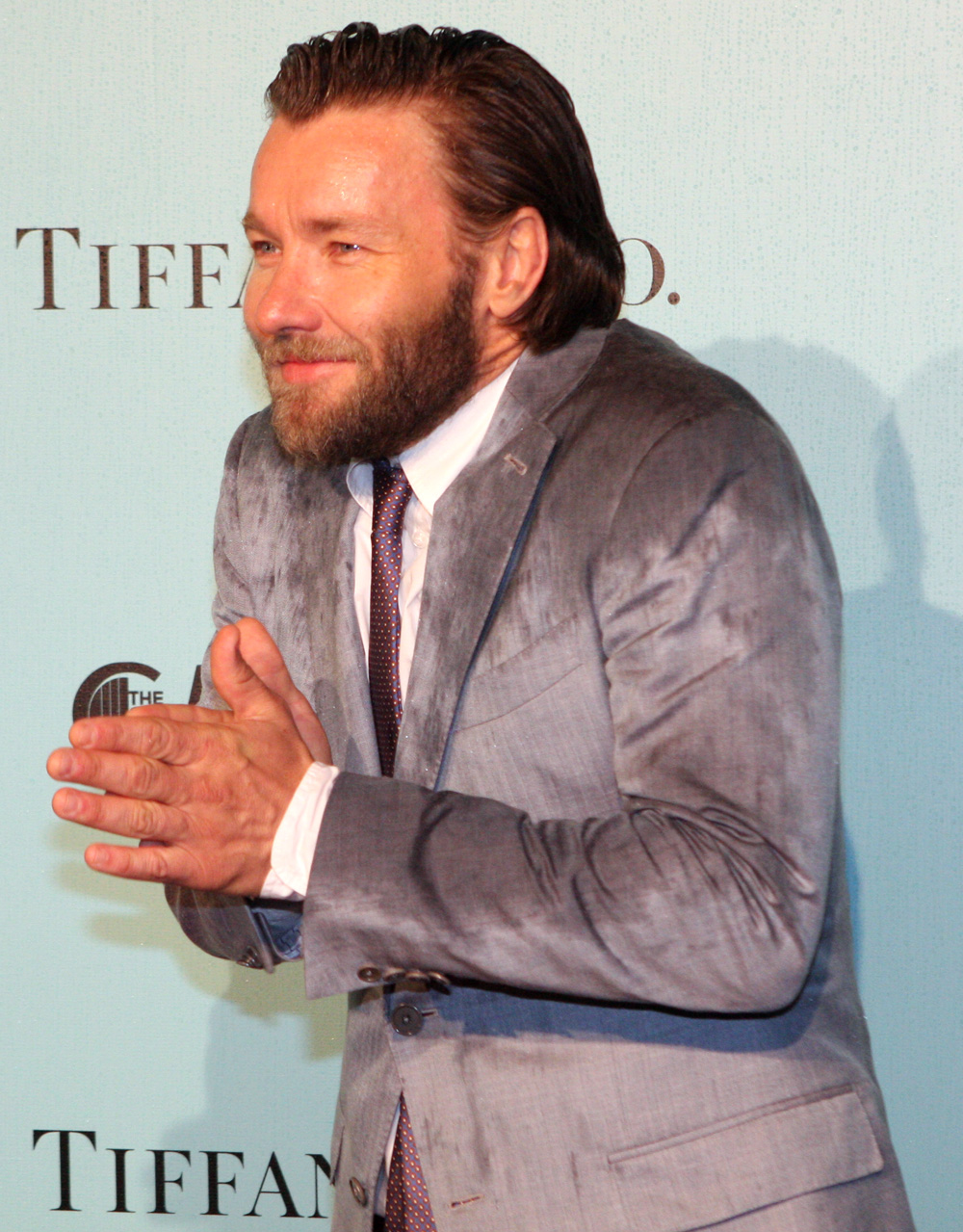
Edgerton at the Sydney premiere of The Great Gatsby, May 2013

Edgerton has appeared in such films as Erskineville Kings, King Arthur and Ned Kelly. In the Star Wars franchise, he played a young Owen Lars in Attack of the Clones (2002) and Revenge of the Sith (2005) and reprised the role in the Disney+ series Obi-Wan Kenobi. He played Will on The Secret Life of Us, for which he won an AACTA Award in 2002. In 2005, he lent his voice to the title character of The Mysterious Geographic Explorations of Jasper Morello, an Academy Award-nominated animated short film. The same year, he appeared as the son of a deceased shoemaker in the British comedy Kinky Boots. He appeared in Smokin' Aces (2006).

Edgerton appeared in the film Whisper (2007), The Square (which he co-wrote and which was directed by his brother Nash Edgerton), Acolytes, and Separation City. In 2009, he starred as Stanley in the Sydney Theatre Company's acclaimed production of A Streetcar Named Desire. He appeared in a production of the same play at the Brooklyn Academy of Music in December 2009. He appeared in the crime drama film Animal Kingdom as Barry Baz Brown in 2010 in which he won an AFI award. He starred as fictional MMA fighter Brendan Conlon in the film Warrior (2011).

In February 2010, Edgerton was cast in Matthijs van Heijningen Jr.'s 2011 prequel to The Thing, portraying helicopter pilot Sam Carter. He played Tom Buchanan in Baz Luhrmann's 2013 remake of The Great Gatsby. He was honoured for his work in international roles with the 2011 Australians in Film Breakthrough Award.

In 2013, it was revealed that Edgerton and David Michôd had collaborated on writing an adaptation of Shakespeare's "Henriad" plays, Henry IV, Part 1, Henry IV, Part 2 and Henry V, for Warner Bros. Pictures.

In 2014, Edgerton starred in the biblical film Exodus: Gods and Kings, as Ramesses II, Moses' adoptive brother, who became a notorious king. Edgerton directed, starred in, wrote, and produced the thriller The Gift, which was released on 7 August 2015 and grossed 60 million with a budget of 5 million. He co-starred in the 2015 film Black Mass as John Connolly, FBI contact and childhood friend of notorious gangster Whitey Bulger.

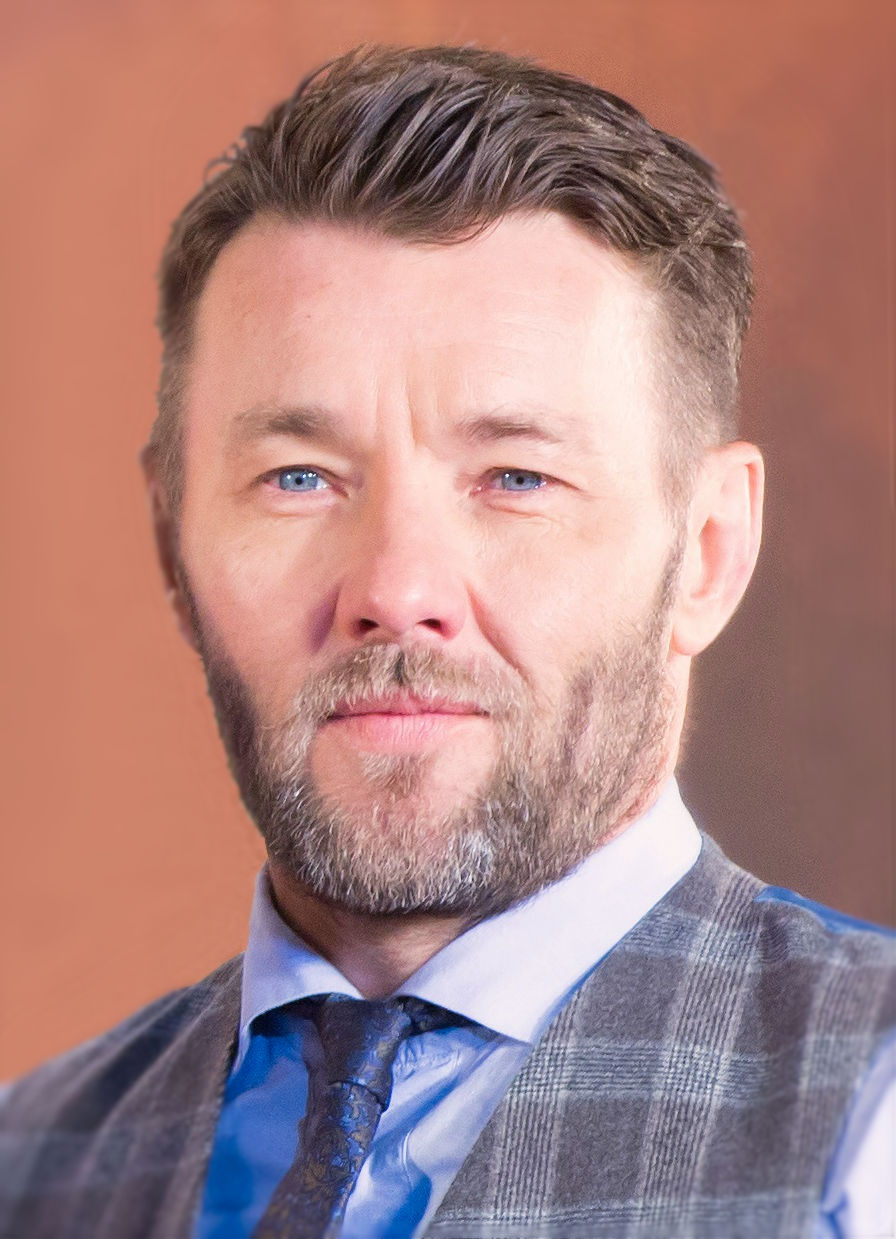
Edgerton in 2017

In 2016, he starred in the Jeff Nichols films Midnight Special and Loving, and in 2017, he starred in the film Bright as Officer Nick Jacoby, an orc who is a police officer.

In 2018, Edgerton headlined Francis Lawrence's thriller film Red Sparrow with Jennifer Lawrence, and based on the book by Jason Matthews. He plays Nathaniel Nash, a CIA agent who becomes involved with a Russian spy Dominika Egorova (Lawrence). In February 2018, Timothée Chalamet joined the cast of The King, with Brad Pitt, Dede Gardner, and Jeremy Kleiner producing, alongside Liz Watts, under their Plan B Entertainment banner. In March 2018, Edgerton joined the cast of the film.

In April 2020, during the COVID-19 pandemic in Australia, it was announced that a new film, The Unknown Man, directed by Thomas M. Wright, would begin filming in South Australia as soon as enough of the COVID-19 restrictions were lifted. It was released in 2022 as The Stranger. In September 2020, Edgerton was tapped to star in and executive produce limited series The Florida Man based on a novel of the same name by Tom Cooper.

In 2021, Edgerton starred in the medieval fantasy film The Green Knight written and directed by David Lowery.

In 2024, Edgerton guest starred in the Bluey episode "The Sign", voicing a German Shepherd policeman.

In 2025, Edgerton starred in the drama film Train Dreams, receiving universal acclaim from the critics. The performance earned him nominations for the Critics' Choice Movie Award for Best Actor and the Independent Spirit Award for Best Lead Performance, among others.

== Philanthropy ==
Edgerton has been a distinguished ambassador for the Fred Hollows Foundation for a number of years and has strong personal ties to the organisation, which works to restore people's sight in poor countries and to improve the health of Aboriginal Australians. In 2012, he visited Nepal, where he saw sight restored first hand. He has described social activism and his involvement with the Fred Hollows Foundation as "an escape" from the "materialistic life" that often surrounds an actor. The Fred Hollows Foundation is an international non-profit organisation which educates and provides equipment for under-supported surgeons to help cure avoidable blindness.

== Personal life ==
Edgerton's brother, Nash, is a stuntman and filmmaker. Both he and his brother are a part of the Australian film collective Blue-Tongue Films. Nash directed Joel in 2018's Gringo.

Joel was in a relationship with Olympic Gold medalist Cathy Freeman from 2003 to 2005.

In 2018, Edgerton began a relationship with Christine Centenera, editor-in-chief of Vogue Australia. They have known each other since the late 1990s. Their twins were born in May 2021.

== Filmography ==
Key
†	Denotes films that have not yet been released

=== Film ===
Year	Title	Role	Notes	Ref.
1996	Race the Sun	Steve Fryman		
1998	Praise	Leo		
1999	Dogwatch	Sparrow		
1999	Erskineville Kings	Wayne		
2000	Sample People	Sem		
2002	Star Wars: Episode II – Attack of the Clones	Owen Lars		
2002	The Hard Word	Shane		
2003	The Night We Called It a Day	Rod Blue		
2003	Ned Kelly	Aaron Sherritt		
2004	King Arthur	Gawain		
2005	The Mysterious Geographic Explorations of Jasper Morello	Jasper Morello	Voice role; short film	
2005	Star Wars: Episode III – Revenge of the Sith	Owen Lars	Cameo appearance	
2005	Kinky Boots	Charlie Price		
2006	Smokin' Aces	Hugo Croop		
2006	Open Window	Peter Delaney		
2007	Whisper	Vince Delayo		
2007	Crossbow	The Dad	Short film	
2007	Spider	Paramedic	Short film	
2008	The Square	Billy	Also writer and executive producer	
2008	Acolytes	Ian Wright		
2008	$9.99	Ron	Voice role	
2009	Separation City	Simon Nicholson		
2009	The Waiting City	Ben Simmons		
2010	Animal Kingdom	Barry "Baz" Brown		
2010	Legend of the Guardians: The Owls of Ga'Hoole	Metal Beak	Voice role	
2010	The Thief	Joel	Short film	
2011	Warrior	Brendan Conlon		
2011	The Thing	Sam Carter		
2012	Wish You Were Here	Dave Flannery		
2012	The Odd Life of Timothy Green	Jim Green		
2012	Zero Dark Thirty	Patrick Grayston		
2013	The Great Gatsby	Tom Buchanan		
2013	Felony	Malcolm "Mal" Toohey	Also writer and producer	
2014	The Rover	—N/a	Co–story writer	
2014	Exodus: Gods and Kings	Ramesses II		
2015	Life	John G. Morris		
2015	The Gift	Gordon "Gordo" Moseley	Also director, writer, and producer	
2015	Black Mass	John Connolly		
2015	Jane Got a Gun	Dan Frost	Also writer	
2016	Midnight Special	Lucas		
2016	Loving	Richard Loving		
2017	It Comes at Night	Paul	Also executive producer	
2017	Bright	Nick Jakoby		
2018	Red Sparrow	Nathaniel "Nate" Nash		
2018	Gringo	Richard Rusk		
2018	Boy Erased	Victor Sykes	Also director, writer, and producer	
2019	The King	Sir John Falstaff	Also writer and producer	
2021	The Green Knight	The Lord		
2022	The Stranger	"Mark Frame"	Also producer	
2022	Thirteen Lives	Richard Harris		
2022	Master Gardener	Narvel Roth / Norton Rupplea		
2023	The Boys in the Boat	Al Ulbrickson		
2025	Train Dreams	Robert Grainier	Also executive producer	
2025	The Plague	Daddy Wags	Also producer	
TBA	2034 †	TBA	Post-production	

=== Television ===
Year	Title	Role	Notes	Ref.
1995	Police Rescue	Andy	Episode: "Wild Card"	
1995, 1997	Spellbinder	Bazza	Episodes: "Run!" and "Reunions"	
1996, 1999	Water Rats	Pete Crosby	Episode: "Eyewitness"	
1996, 1999	Water Rats	Aaron Lawrence	Episode: "Force of Habit"	
1997	Big Sky	Pierce Bateman	Episode: "Lost and Found"	
1997	Fallen Angels	Scoob	Episode: "The Faust Lane"	
1998	Wildside	Michael Savini	Episode: "#1.15"	
1999	Secret Men's Business	Baz	Television film	
2000	The Three Stooges	Tom Cosgrove	Television film	
2001–2002	The Secret Life of Us	William "Will" McGill	Main role; 32 episodes (seasons 1–2)	
2002	Dossa and Joe	Robbo	Episodes: "#1.3" and "#1.4"	
2007	Dangerous	Senior Sergeant Mark Field	Main role; 7 episodes	
2009	Dirt Game	Shane Bevic	Main role; 6 episodes	
2021	The Underground Railroad	Arnold Ridgeway	Miniseries; 6 episodes	
2022	Obi-Wan Kenobi	Owen Lars	Episodes: "Part I" and "Part VI"	
2024	Bluey	Policeman	Voice role, episode: "The Sign"	
2024–present	Dark Matter	Jason Dessen	Main role; 9 episodes (also executive producer)	

== Stage ==
Year	Title	Role	Venue / theatre company	Ref.
1994	The Poet, the Women and the Frocks		Crossroads Theatre, Sydney with University of Western Sydney, Theatre Nepean	
1995	Eventspace 1: Intersections		Performance Space, Sydney with Klunk	
1995	Thyestes		Number Five Bond Store, Sydney	
1995	Blackrock	Toby	Wharf Theatre with STC	
1996	Skin: Somewhere in the Darkness / Historia	The Anthropologist / Chorus (Historia)	Wharf Theatre with STC	
1996	Dead White Males		University of Sydney, Suncorp Theatre, Brisbane, Newcastle Civic Theatre with STC	
1997	Third World Blues	Graham	Sydney Opera House with STC	
1998	Henry IV	Prince Hal	Sydney Opera House, Canberra Theatre, Malthouse Theatre, Melbourne, Theatre Royal, Hobart, Monash University, Melbourne, His Majesty's Theatre, Perth with Bell Shakespeare	
1998	Love for Love	Valentine	Sydney Opera House with STC	
1999	Henry V	King Henry V	Melbourne Athenaeum, Playhouse, Canberra, Sydney Opera House with Bell Shakespeare	
2007	The Pillowman	Katurian	Malthouse Theatre, Melbourne with MTC	
2009	A Streetcar Named Desire	Stanley Kowalski	Sydney Theatre, John F. Kennedy Center for the Performing Arts, Washington DC, Brooklyn Academy of Music, New York with STC	

== Awards and nominations ==
Year	Award	Category	Subject	Result	Ref.
2000	AACTA Awards	Best Lead Actor in a Television Drama	The Secret Life of Us	Nominated	
2002	AACTA Awards	Best Lead Actor in a Television Drama	The Secret Life of Us	Won	
2002	Logie Awards	Most Outstanding Actor	The Secret Life of Us	Nominated	
2002	AACTA Awards	Best Actor in a Supporting Role	The Hard Word	Nominated	
2002	Film Critics Circle of Australia Awards	Best Supporting Actor	The Hard Word	Nominated	
2003	Film Critics Circle of Australia Awards	Best Supporting Actor	Ned Kelly	Nominated	
2008	AACTA Awards	Best Actor in a Supporting Role	The Square	Nominated	
2008	AACTA Awards	Best Original Screenplay (with Matthew Dabner)	The Square	Nominated	
2009	Film Critics Circle of Australia Awards	Best Supporting Actor	The Square	Nominated	
2009	Film Critics Circle of Australia Awards	Best Original Screenplay (with Matthew Dabner)	The Square	Won	
2010	AACTA Awards	Best Actor in a Supporting Role	Animal Kingdom	Won	
2011	Film Critics Circle of Australia Awards	Best Supporting Actor	Animal Kingdom	Won	
2011	Film Critics Circle of Australia Awards	Best Actor	The Waiting City	Nominated	
2012	MTV Movie & TV Awards	Best Fight (with Tom Hardy)	Warrior	Nominated	
2013	AACTA Awards	Best Actor in a Leading Role	Wish You Were Here	Nominated	
2013	Australian Film Critics Association Awards	Best Actor	Wish You Were Here	Won	
2013	Film Critics Circle of Australia Awards	Best Actor	Wish You Were Here	Won	
2014	AACTA International Awards	Best Actor in a Supporting Role	The Great Gatsby	Nominated	
2014	AACTA Awards	Best Actor in a Supporting Role	The Great Gatsby	Nominated	
2014	Australian Film Critics Association Awards	Best Supporting Actor	The Great Gatsby	Nominated	
2014	Film Critics Circle of Australia Awards	Best Supporting Actor	The Great Gatsby	Won	
2015	Film Critics Circle of Australia Awards	Best Actor	Felony	Nominated	
2015	Film Critics Circle of Australia Awards	Best Original Screenplay	Felony	Nominated	
2015	Hollywood Film Awards	Breakthrough Actor	Black Mass	Won	
2016	AACTA International Awards	Best Actor in a Supporting Role	Black Mass	Nominated	
2016	Santa Barbara International Film Festival	Virtuosos Award	Black Mass	Won	
2016	Directors Guild of America Awards	Outstanding Directorial Achievement in First-Time Feature Film	The Gift	Nominated	
2016	Austin Film Critics Association	Best Actor	Loving	Nominated	
2016	Boston Society of Film Critics	Best Actor	Loving	Nominated	
2016	Critics' Choice Movie Awards	Best Actor	Loving	Nominated	
2016	Chicago Film Critics Association	Best Actor	Loving	Nominated	
2016	Dallas-Fort Worth Film Critics Association	Best Actor	Loving	Nominated	
2016	Detroit Film Critics Society	Best Actor	Loving	Nominated	
2016	Florida Film Critics Circle	Best Actor	Loving	Nominated	
2016	Gotham Awards	Best Actor	Loving	Nominated	
2016	Indiewire Critics' Poll	Best Actor	Loving	6th place	
2016	San Diego Film Critics Society	Best Actor	Loving	Nominated	
2016	San Francisco Film Critics Circle	Best Actor	Loving	Nominated	
2016	Satellite Awards	Best Actor – Motion Picture	Loving	Nominated	
2016	St. Louis Film Critics Association	Best Actor	Loving	Nominated	
2016	Utah Film Critics Association	Best Actor	Loving	Nominated	
2016	Village Voice Film Poll	Best Lead Performance	Loving	6th place	
2016	Washington D.C. Area Film Critics Association	Best Actor	Loving	Nominated	
2016	Women Film Critics Circle	Best Actor	Loving	Nominated	
2017	Golden Globe Awards	Best Actor in a Motion Picture – Drama	Loving	Nominated	
2017	AACTA International Awards	Best Actor	Loving	Nominated	
2017	Alliance of Women Film Journalists	Best Actor	Loving	Nominated	
2017	North Carolina Film Critics Association	Best Actor	Loving	Nominated	
2018	AACTA Awards	Best Film	Boy Erased	Nominated	
2018	AACTA Awards	Best Direction	Boy Erased	Nominated	
2018	AACTA Awards	Best Adapted Screenplay	Boy Erased	Won	
2018	AACTA Awards	Best Supporting Actor	Boy Erased	Nominated	
2018	AACTA Awards	Best International Supporting Actor	Boy Erased	Nominated	
2019	AACTA Awards	Best Film	The King	Nominated	
2019	AACTA Awards	Best Screenplay	The King	Nominated	
2019	AACTA Awards	Best Supporting Actor	The King	Won	
2019	AACTA Awards	Best International Film	The King	Nominated	
2025	Camerimage	Actor's Award	Train Dreams	Won	
2025	Chicago International Film Festival	Artistic Achievement Award	Train Dreams	Won (Note: Shared with Clint Bentley.)	
2025	Deauville American Film Festival	Talent Award	Train Dreams	Won	
2025	Middleburg Film Festival	Outstanding Achievement in Acting Award	Train Dreams	Won	
2025	Mill Valley Film Festival	Spotlight Award	Train Dreams	Won	
2025	Savannah Film Festival	Vanguard Award	Train Dreams	Won	
2026	Critics' Choice Awards	Best Actor	Train Dreams	Nominated	
2026	Golden Globe Awards	Best Actor in a Motion Picture – Drama	Train Dreams	Nominated	
2026	Independent Spirit Awards	Best Lead Performance	Train Dreams	Nominated	
2026	Independent Spirit Awards	Best Film	The Plague	Nominated	

== See also ==
- List of Australian film actors
