= Andrew McAuley =

Australian mountaineer and sea kayaker

- Born: 7 August 1968; Goulburn, New South Wales, Australia
- Disappeared: 9 February 2007 (aged 38); Tasman Sea
- Status: Presumed dead
- Occupations: Mountaineer, adventurer
- Known for: Attempting to cross the Tasman Sea in a sea kayak
- Spouse: Vicki McAuley
- Children: 1
- Father: Peter McAuley

Andrew McAuley (born 7 August 1968; presumed dead 9–12 February 2007) was an Australian mountaineer and sea kayaker. He is presumed to have died following his disappearance at sea while attempting to kayak 1600 km (994 mi) across the Tasman Sea from Australia to New Zealand in February 2007.

== Personal life ==
McAuley was born in Goulburn, New South Wales, on 7 August 1968. He attended Anglican Church Grammar School in East Brisbane and finished Year 12 in 1984. He was awarded Adventurer of the Year in 2005 by the Australian Geographic Society.

== Mountain climbing ==
McAuley climbed many peaks in Australia, New Zealand, Pakistan, and Patagonia. He preferred to find new routes and make exploratory climbs.

== Sea kayaking ==
In 2003, he made the first nonstop kayak crossing of the Bass Strait. In 2004, he kayaked across the Gulf of Carpentaria. In 2006, he led an expedition in the Australian Antarctic Territory, where they paddled over 800 km within the Antarctic Circle.

=== Attempts to cross the Tasman Sea ===
In December 2006, McAuley's first attempt to cross the Tasman Sea in a modified one-man kayak was aborted after one night due to trouble keeping warm inside the cockpit.

McAuley's second attempt began on 11 January 2007 and ended on 12 February, when the search for his missing body was called off following the recovery of his partly flooded kayak on 10 February about 30 nmi (56 km) short of his destination, Milford Sound.

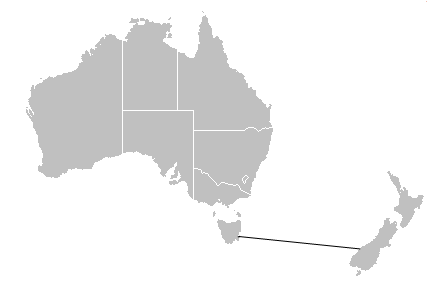
Tasman Solo

The sleeping arrangements at sea involved deploying a drift anchor, squeezing his body down into the kayak, and sealing the hatch with a bulbous fibreglass capsule (dubbed "Casper") fitted with an air-only ventilator, which, with its self-righting capabilities, made possible riding out the most severe storm conditions that are inevitable in that part of the ocean.

When the capsule was pivoted to its stowing position behind the cockpit, though, it made a kayak roll impossible due to being filled with water, like a bucket. Therefore, whenever he capsized, he had to swim out of the kayak, push it upright, and perform full self-rescue.

When his kayak was recovered, only this capsule was missing. It was presumed to have been torn off by a rogue wave. One of its pivot arms had already been damaged.

Veteran sailor Jonathan Borgais, who was directing the expedition by providing weather predictions, said, "From the beginning, my biggest concern was the approach to New Zealand. And this part of New Zealand is notoriously dangerous. On a good day, you can get rogue waves: a two- or three-metre set that can come out of nowhere. Not big, but powerful. That's very dangerous. I have no doubt that a wave got him."

== Aftermath ==
The documentary of McAuley's journey, Solo, incorporated video footage recovered from one surviving memory stick in his camera, as well as interviews with people on his team during the expedition. It begins with the distress call he made on the evening of 9 February: "Do you copy? This is kayak one. Do you copy, over? I've got an emergency situation. I'm in a kayak about 30 km from Milford Sound. I need a rescue. My kayak's sinking. Fell off into the sea and I'm going down."

McAuley's wife, Vicki McAuley, wrote a book, Solo, about his final voyage and him.

In the same summer, a specially constructed, two-person kayak crossed the Tasman Sea by a more northerly route. The competitive spirit may have played a part in McAuley's determination to make the journey when he did. The song "Towards Infinity" was written about his final journey by Australian composers Paul Jarman and Phil Voysey.

== See also ==
- List of people who disappeared mysteriously at sea
