= Edinburgh Mountain Film Festival =

Film festival in Edinburgh, Scotland

Edinburgh Mountain Film Festival is an independent film festival held in Edinburgh, Scotland, which aims to inspire, enlighten and entertain outdoor enthusiasts such as climbers, skiers or snowboarders, kayakers, BASE jumpers or explorers. It is not part of the main Edinburgh Festival, and held at a different time of year. The next festival will be in February 2018.

The festival was established in 2003 and has been held annually since. Over 2,000 people attend the festival each year, making the EMFF one of the best-attended mountain film festivals in the UK.

Past speakers have included Sir Chris Bonington, Simon Yates, Dave MacLeod, Timmy O'Neill, Andrew Greig and Barry Blanchard, as well as adventurers such as Mark Beaumont, Benedict Allen and Justine Curgenven.

The festival runs film, photography and writing competitions open to the public.
