= Michele Bennett (film producer) =

Australian film producer

- Born: Michele Rosemary Bennett; Australia
- Occupation: Film producer
- Years active: 1982–present
- Partner: Michael Hutchence (1982–1987)

Michele Rosemary Bennett is an Australian film and television producer. She is the founder of Cherub Pictures and Pariah Productions and has produced films such as Chopper (2000), The Magician (2005), Drift (2013), and Judy and Punch (2019), as well as the television series Mr Inbetween (2018–2021), NCIS: Sydney (2023) and Queen of Oz (2023). Bennett has also produced music videos for artists such as INXS, U2, Prince, Silverchair and Foo Fighters.

Bennett's relationship with INXS lead vocalist, Michael Hutchence, inspired the band's 1988 hit single "Never Tear Us Apart".

== Career ==
In the early 1980s, Bennett had four jobs while she was studying at University in Melbourne, including a brief career as a model, and then started working as a photographer's agent.

In 1982, Bennett appeared on the music video for "The One Thing" by INXS, as one of the women at the banquet table.

In the late 1980s, Bennett started working with Australian filmmaker Richard Lowenstein on several music videos. In 1986, she made a cameo in Lowenstein's film Dogs in Space. In 1989, Bennett produced the U2 documentary LoveTown, directed by Lowenstein.

In the early 1990s, Bennett produced the INXS music videos "Suicide Blonde", "By My Side" and "Bitter Tears". She also produced music videos for artists such as U2, Prince, Silverchair, and Foo Fighters.

Bennett began collaborating with Australian filmmaker Andrew Dominik on music videos and commercials in Sydney in the early 1990s.

In 1991, Bennett founded her own production company, Cherub Pictures. The company has produced music videos, documentaries and television commercials.

In 2000, Bennett produced her first feature film through her company Pariah Productions, Andrew Dominik's crime drama Chopper (2000), which became a critical and box office hit in Australia. Since then, Bennett has produced feature films such as Scott Ryan's The Magician (2005), Morgan O'Neill and Ben Nott's Drift (2013), and Mirrah Foulkes's Judy and Punch (2019).

In 2004, Bennett produced the INXS documentary Welcome to Wherever You Are, directed by Lowenstein. In 2005, she produced the documentary Leonard Cohen: I'm Your Man, directed by Lian Lunson.

From 2018 to 2021, Bennett produced the television series Mr Inbetween.

In February 2019, Bennett was a member of the jury of the Tropfest in Sydney.

In 2023, Bennett produced the television series NCIS: Sydney and Queen of Oz.

== Personal life ==
Bennett speaks Mandarin.

From 1982 to 1987, Bennett was in a relationship with INXS lead singer Michael Hutchence. They shared a flat in Paddington with New Zealand-Australian singer Jenny Morris, who was INXS's backing vocalist. Bennett inspired INXS's 1988 hit song "Never Tear Us Apart". Bennett introduced Hutchence to Australian filmmaker Richard Lowenstein, who directed several music videos for INXS, including the one for "Never Tear Us Apart". According to Hutchence's sister, Tina, Bennett was the only woman her brother said he had considered marrying. Lowenstein, who was close friends with Hutchence, also said that he believed that Bennett was the only woman that Hutchence would marry; "I always felt that, after everything, he'd go back and marry Michele and have a baby with her," he told The Independent in 1998.

Bennett and Hutchence remained close friends after the end of their relationship and she was described as Hutchence's "first real love", his "closest friend and confidante". Bennett was the last person that Hutchence called on the morning of his death, on 22 November 1997. According to Bennett, Hutchence called her two times that morning; first he left a message in her answering machine, then he called her again at 9:54 am and she answered the phone. Bennett said that Hutchence was crying, sounded upset, and told her he needed to see her. Bennett arrived at his hotel room door at about 10:40 am, but there was no response, so she wrote him a note and left it at reception. Hutchence's body was discovered by a hotel maid at 11:50 am. His death was ruled as suicide while depressed and under the influence of alcohol and other drugs.

Bennett refused to talk about her relationship with Hutchence publicly until the 2019 documentary Mystify: Michael Hutchence, directed by Richard Lowenstein, a close friend of both Bennett and Hutchence's.

== In popular culture ==
Bennett was portrayed by actress Jane Harber in the 2014 Australian biographical miniseries INXS: Never Tear Us Apart. Bennett claimed that the miniseries was not accurate and that she was not contacted by the filmmakers.

== Filmography ==
Actress

Year	Title	Role	Director	Notes
1982	INXS - "The One Thing"	Girl at the banquet table	Richard Lowenstein	Music video
1986	Dogs in Space	Grant's girl	Richard Lowenstein	Feature film; as Michelle Bennett

Producer

Year	Title	Director(s)	Notes
1989	U2: LoveTown	Richard Lowenstein	Documentary
1989	Flying Emus: Different Drum	Paul Clarke	Music video
1990	INXS: Suicide Blonde	Richard Lowenstein	Music video
1991	INXS: By My Side	Richard Lowenstein	Music video
1991	INXS: Bitter Tears	Richard Lowenstein	Music video
2000	Chopper	Andrew Dominik	Feature film
2004	INXS: Welcome to Wherever You Are	Richard Lowenstein	Documentary
2005	The Magician	Scott Ryan	Feature film
2006	Magic Happens: The Story of 'The Magician'	Luke Doolan	Documentary
2007	September	Peter Carstairs	Consulting producer
2009	Apricot	Ben Briand	Short film
2013	Drift	Morgan O'Neill and Ben Nott	Feature film
2019	Judy and Punch	Mirrah Foulkes	Feature film
2021	Shark	Nash Edgerton	Short film
2023	Queen of Oz	Christiaan Van Vuuren	Television series

Executive producer

Year	Title	Director(s)	Notes
2004	It Takes Two to Tango	Luke Shanahan	Short film
2005	Leonard Cohen: I'm Your Man	Lian Lunson	Documentary; executive in charge of production for Cherub Pictures
2010	Bridezilla: Western Front	Justin Kurzel and Daniel Fletcher	Music video
2014	The Mule	Tony Mahony and Angus Sampson	Feature film
2018–2021	Mr Inbetween	Nash Edgerton	Television series
2023	NCIS: Sydney	Shawn Seet, David Caesar, Kriv Stenders and Catherine Millar	Television series

== Accolades ==
Year	Award	Category	Work	Result	Ref.
2000	Australian Film Institute Awards	Best Film	Chopper	Nominated	
2018	Screen Producers Australia Awards	Drama Series Production of the Year	Mr Inbetween	Won	
2018	Australian Academy of Cinema and Television Arts Awards	Best Drama Series	Mr Inbetween	Nominated	
2019	Australian Academy of Cinema and Television Arts Awards	Best Film	Judy and Punch	Nominated	
2019	Australian Academy of Cinema and Television Arts Awards	Best Drama Series	Mr Inbetween	Nominated	
2019	Film Critics Circle of Australia Awards	Best Film	Judy and Punch	Nominated	
2021	Australian Academy of Cinema and Television Arts Awards	Best Drama Series	Mr Inbetween	Nominated	
