= 9th AACTA Awards =

Australian film and television awards ceremony

- Date: 4 December 2019
- Location: The Star, Sydney, New South Wales, Australia
- Hosted by: Shane Jacobson

Highlights
- Most awards: The Nightingale
- Best Film: The Nightingale
- Best Television Drama Series: Total Control
- Best Television Comedy Series: The Letdown

Television/radio coverage
- Network: Seven Network

The 9th Australian Academy of Cinema and Television Arts Awards (generally known as the AACTA Awards) is an awards ceremony to celebrate the best of Australian films and television of 2019. The main ceremony was held at The Star in Sydney and was televised on the Seven Network. First awards were presented on 4 December 2019. The recipient of the Longford Lyell Award was actor and filmmaker Sam Neill.

== Feature film ==
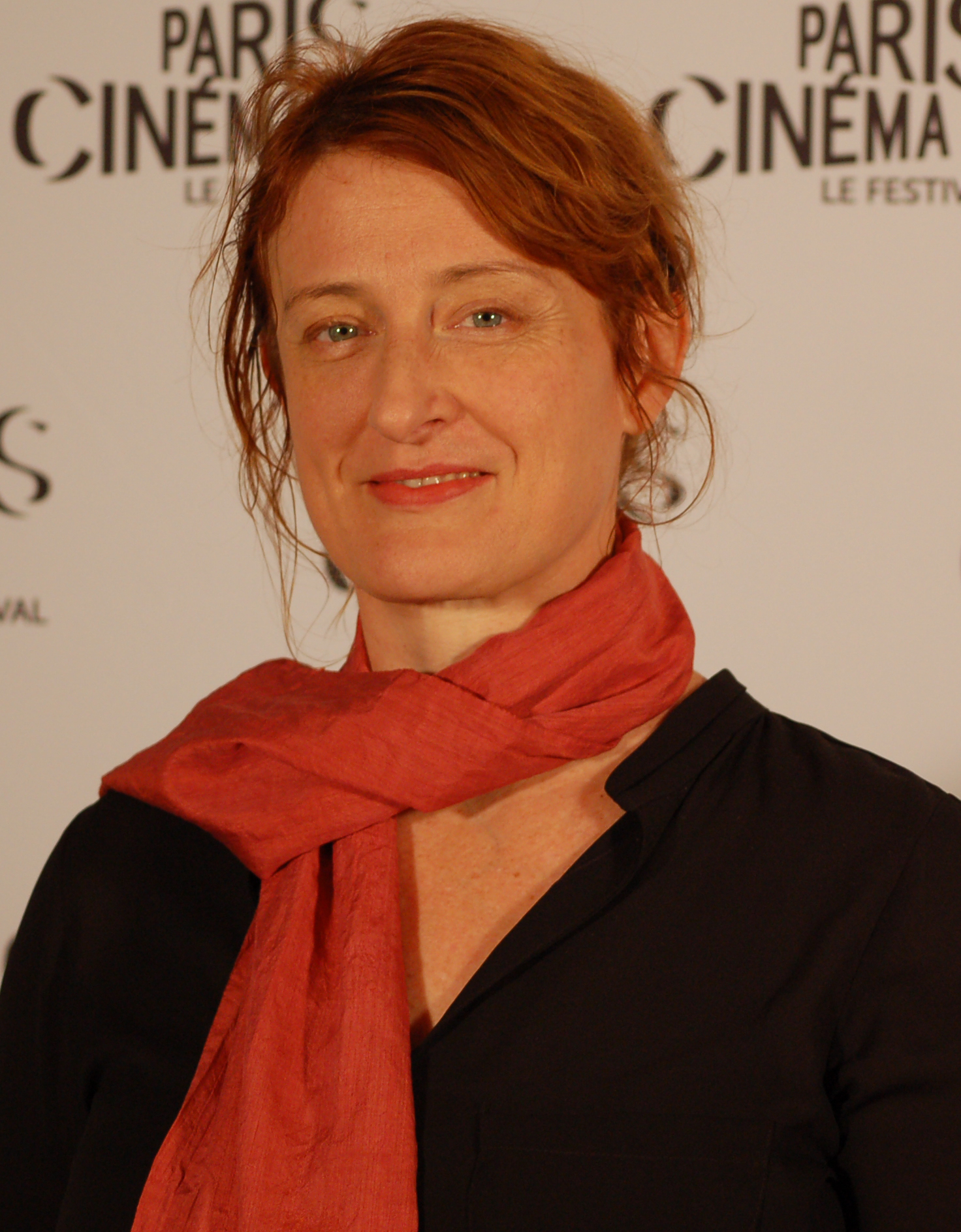
Jennifer Kent, Best Direction winner

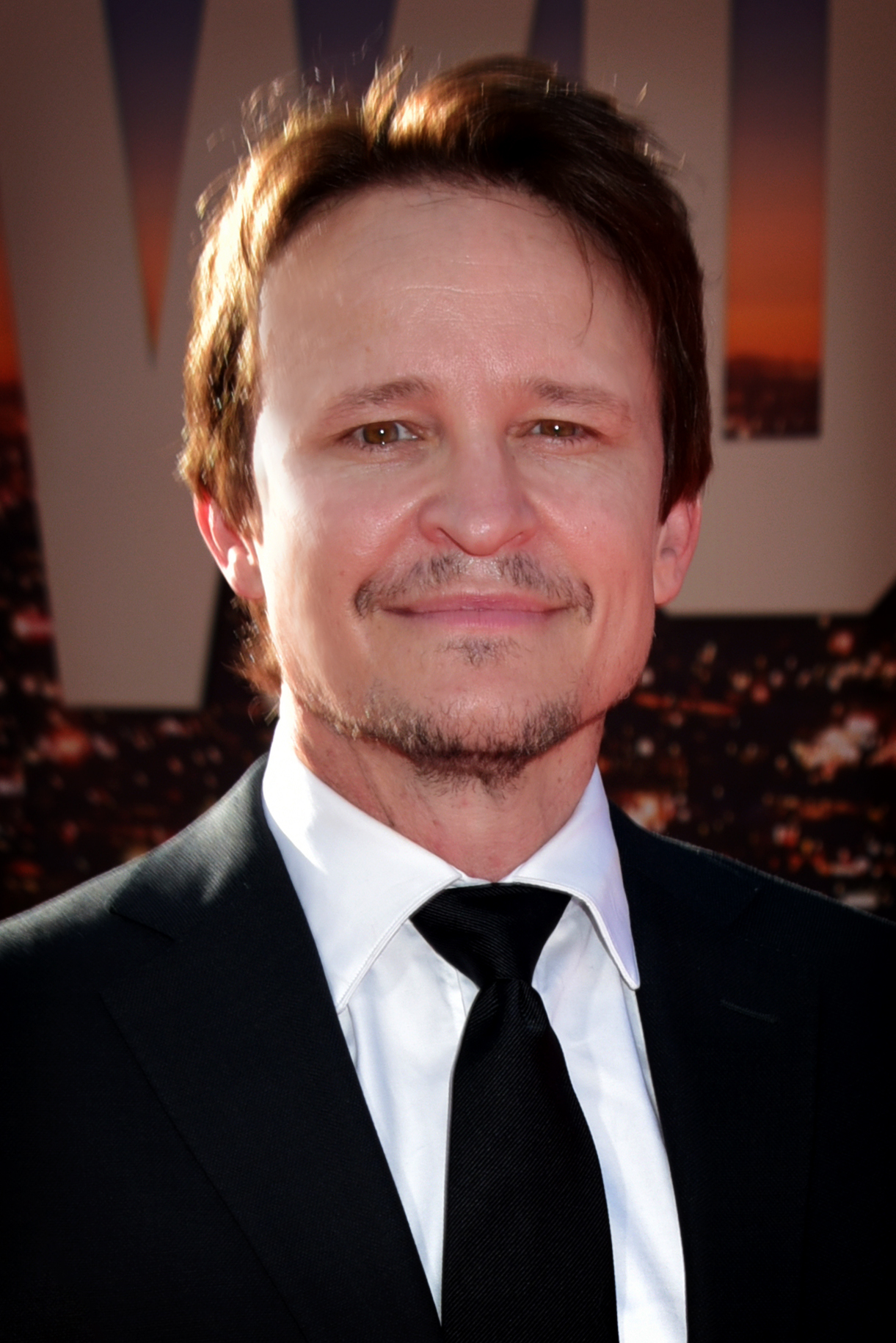
Damon Herriman, Best Lead Actor winner

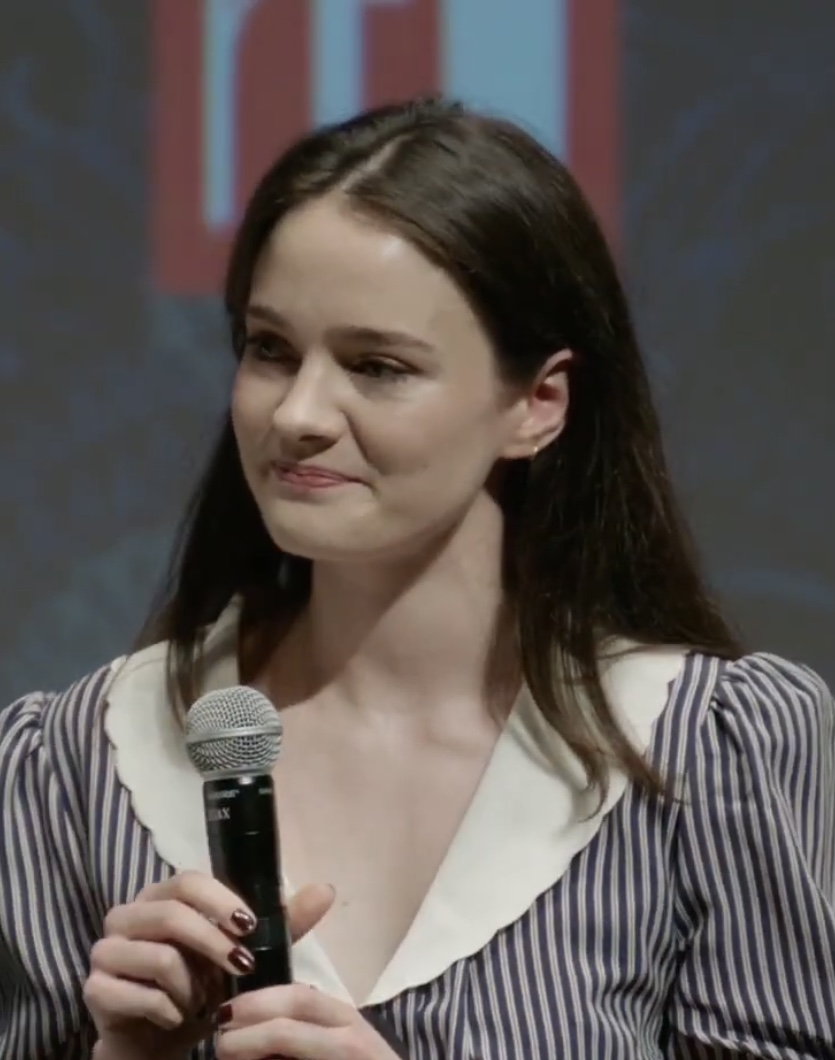
Aisling Franciosi, Best Lead Actress winner

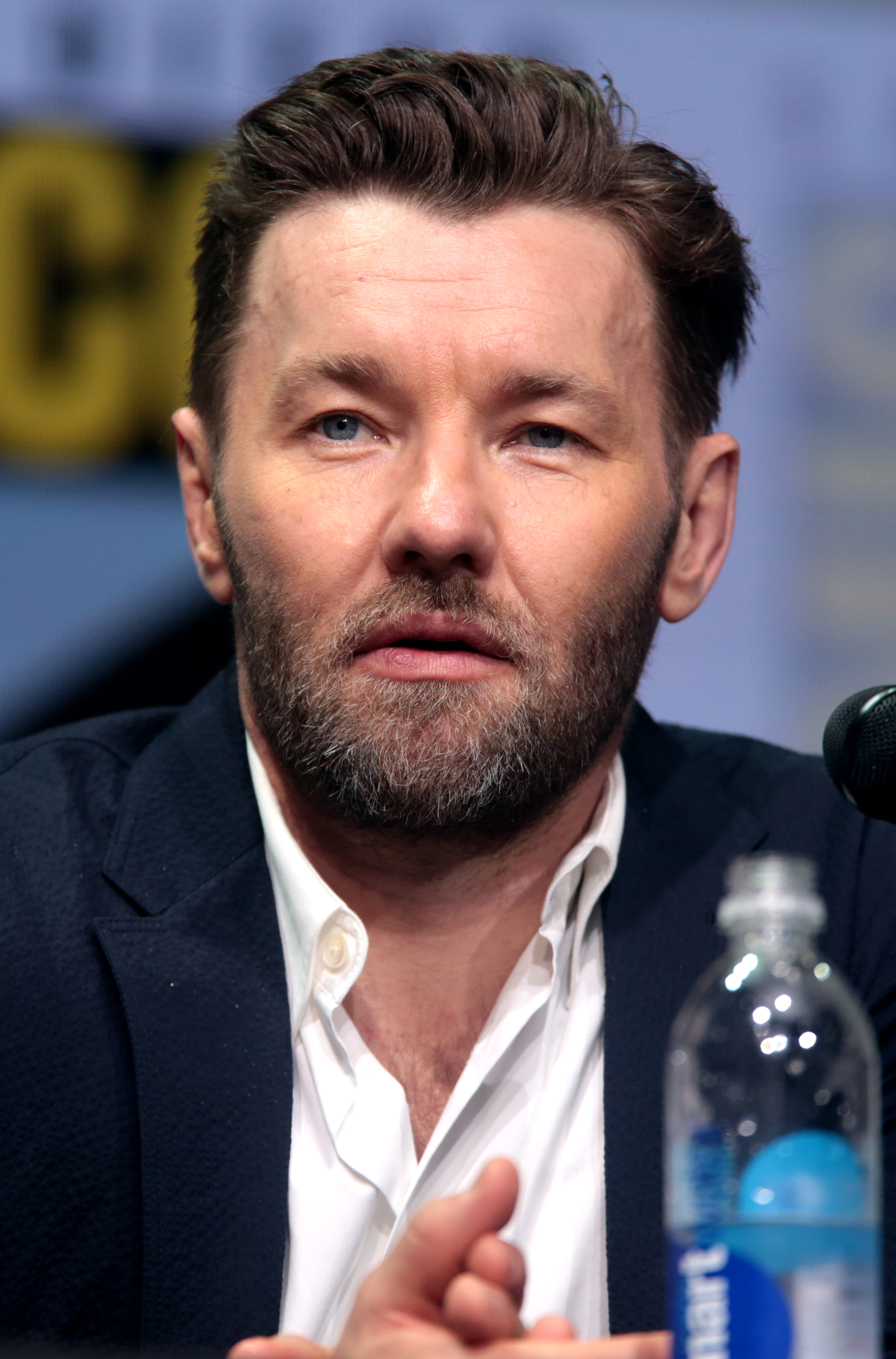
Joel Edgerton, Best Supporting Actor winner

Best Film: The Nightingale — Kristina Ceyton, Bruna Papandrea, Steve Hutensky, Jennifer Kent; Hotel Mumbai — Basil Iwanyk, Gary Hamilton, Julie Ryan, and Jomon Thomas; Judy and Punch — Michele Bennett, Nash Edgerton, Danny Gabai; The King — Brad Pitt, Dede Gardner, Jeremy Kleiner, Liz Watts, David Michôd, Joel Edgerton; Ride Like a Girl — Richard Keddie, Rachel Griffiths, Susie Montague; Top End Wedding — Rosemary Blight, Kylie du Fresne, Kate Croser	Best Direction: Jennifer Kent — The Nightingale; Anthony Maras — Hotel Mumbai; Mirrah Foulkes — Judy and Punch; David Michôd — The King
Best Lead Actor: Damon Herriman as Punch — Judy and Punch; Timothée Chalamet as King Henry V — The King; Baykali Ganambarr as "Billy" Mangana — The Nightingale; Dev Patel as Arjun — Hotel Mumbai; Hugo Weaving as Dan Fisher — Hearts and Bones	Best Lead Actress: Aisling Franciosi as Clare Carroll — The Nightingale; Nazanin Boniadi as Zahra — Hotel Mumbai; Teresa Palmer as Michelle Payne — Ride Like a Girl; Miranda Tapsell as Lauren — Top End Wedding; Mia Wasikowska as Judy — Judy and Punch
Best Supporting Actor: Joel Edgerton as Falstaff — The King; Damon Herriman as Ruse — The Nightingale; Andrew Luri as Sebastian Ahmed — Hearts and Bones; Ben Mendelsohn as King Henry IV — The King; Michael Sheasby as Aidan Carroll — The Nightingale	Best Supporting Actress: Magnolia Maymuru as Lowanna — The Nightingale; Tilda Cobham-Hervey as Sally — Hotel Mumbai; Hilary Swank as Woman — I Am Mother; Bolude Watson as Anishka Ahmed — Hearts and Bones; Ursula Yovich as Daffy Ford — Top End Wedding
Best Cinematography: Adam Arkapaw — The King; Ben Nott — Danger Close: The Battle of Long Tan; Nick Remy Matthews — Hotel Mumbai; Radek Ladczuk — The Nightingale	Best Editing: Peter McNulty, Anthony Maras — Hotel Mumbai; Dany Cooper — Judy & Punch; Peter Sciberras — The King; Simon Njoo — The Nightingale
Best Original Music Score: François Tétaz — Judy and Punch; Caitlin Yeo — Danger Close: The Battle of Long Tan; Volker Bertelmann — Hotel Mumbai; David Hirschfelder — Ride Like a Girl	Best Sound: Liam Egan — Danger Close: The Battle of Long Tan; Sam Petty, Pete Smith, Nakul Kamte, James Currie, Peter Ristic — Hotel Mumbai; Robert Mackenzie, Sam Petty, Gareth John, Leah Katz, Mario Vacarro, Tara Webb — The King; Robert Mackenzie, Dean Ryan, Leah Katz, Pete Smith — The Nightingale
Best Production Design: Fiona Crombie, Alice Felton — The King; Steven Jones-Evans — Hotel Mumbai; Jo Ford — Judy and Punch; Alex Holmes — The Nightingale	Best Costume Design: Jane Petrie — The King; Anna Borghesi — Hotel Mumbai; Edie Kurzer — Judy and Punch; Margot Wilson — The Nightingale
Best Screenplay, Original or Adapted: Jennifer Kent — The Nightingale; John Collee, Anthony Maras — Hotel Mumbai; Mirrah Foulkes — Judy & Punch; David Michod, Joel Edgerton — The King	Best Visual Effects or Animation: Spider-Man: Far From Home — Brendan Seals, Michael Perdew, Andrew Zink, Adam Gailey; Aquaman — Kelvin McIlwain, Kimberly Nelson LoCascio, Josh Simmonds, David Nelson; Captain Marvel — Chris Townsend, Damien Carr, Paul Butterworth, Greg Jowle; Dumbo — Richard Stammers, Hal Couzens, Hayley Williams, Dennis Jones, Corinne Teng; I Am Mother — Jonathan Dearing, Chris Spry
Best Hair and Makeup: Lambs of God — Zeljka Stanin, Paul Pattison, Cheryl Williams; The King — Alessandro Bertolazzi; Nekrotronic — Angela Conte, Paul Katte, Nick Nicolaou, Rosemary Saffioti; The Nightingale — Nikki Gooley, Larry Van Duynhoven, Cassie O'Brien	Best Casting: The Nightingale — Nikki Barrett; Hotel Mumbai — Ann Fay, Leigh Pickford, Trishaan Sarkar; The King — Des Hamilton, Francine Maisler; Total Control — Anousha Zarkesh
Best Indie Film: Buoyancy — Rodd Rathjen, Samantha Jennings, Kristina Ceyton, Rita Walsh; Book Week — Heath Davis, Joanne Weatherstone; Acute Misfortune — Thomas M. Wright, Virginia Kay, Jamie Houge, Liz Kearney; Emu Runner — Imogen Thomas, Victor Evatt, Antonia Barnard, John Fink; Sequin in a Blue Room — Samuel Van Grinsven, Sophie Hattch, Linus Gibson

== Television ==
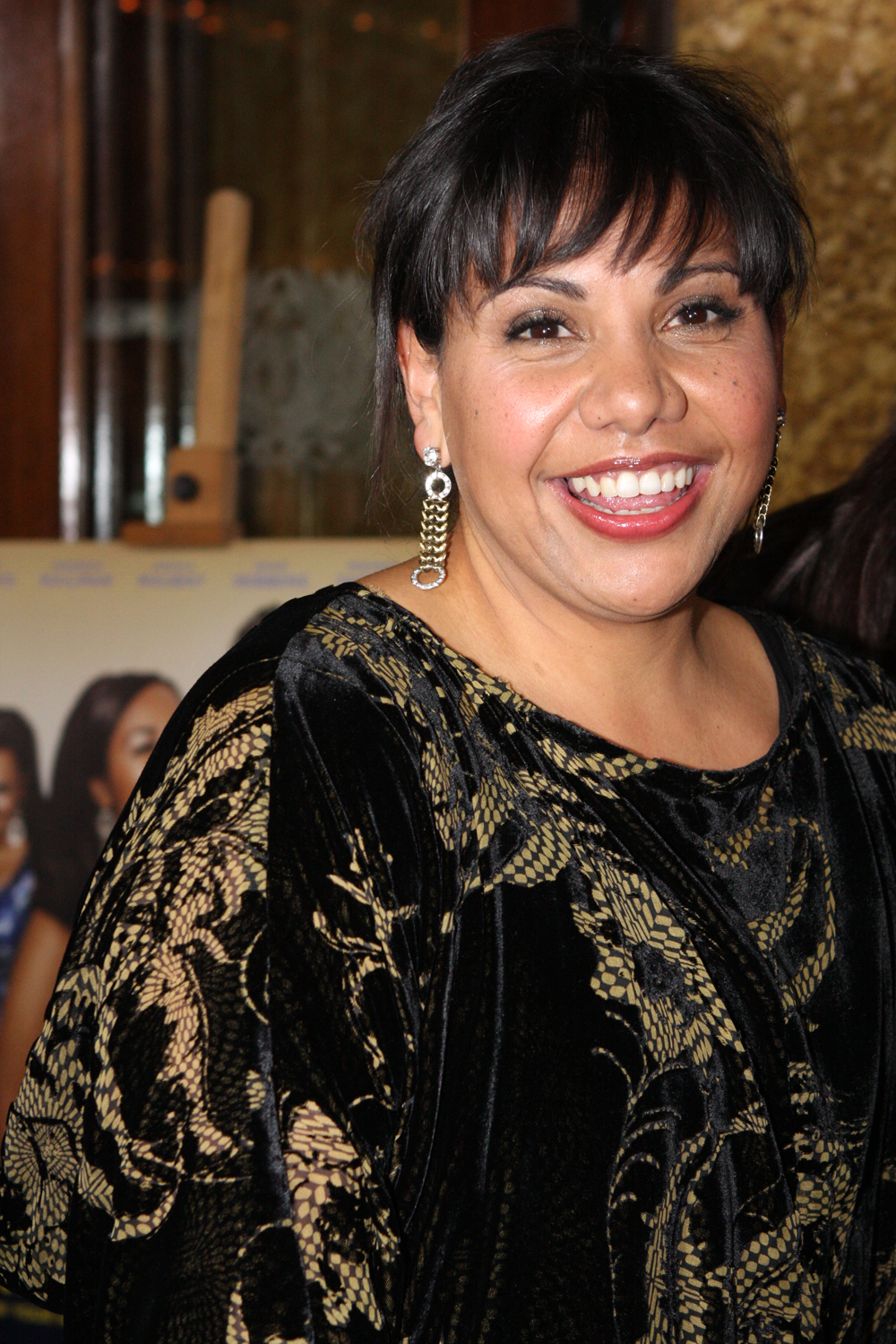
Deborah Mailman, Best Lead Actress – Drama winner

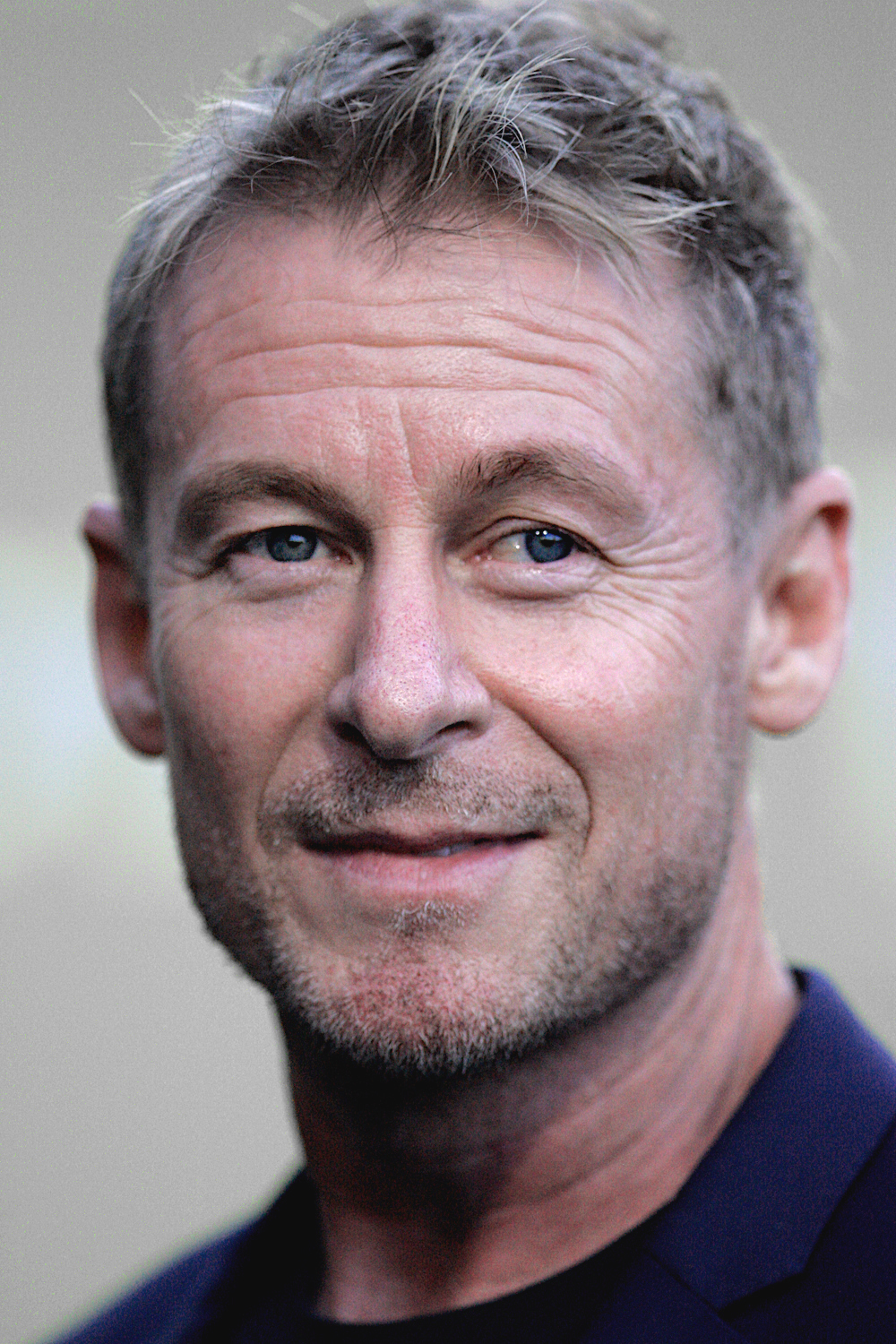
Richard Roxburgh, Best Supporting Actor – Drama winner

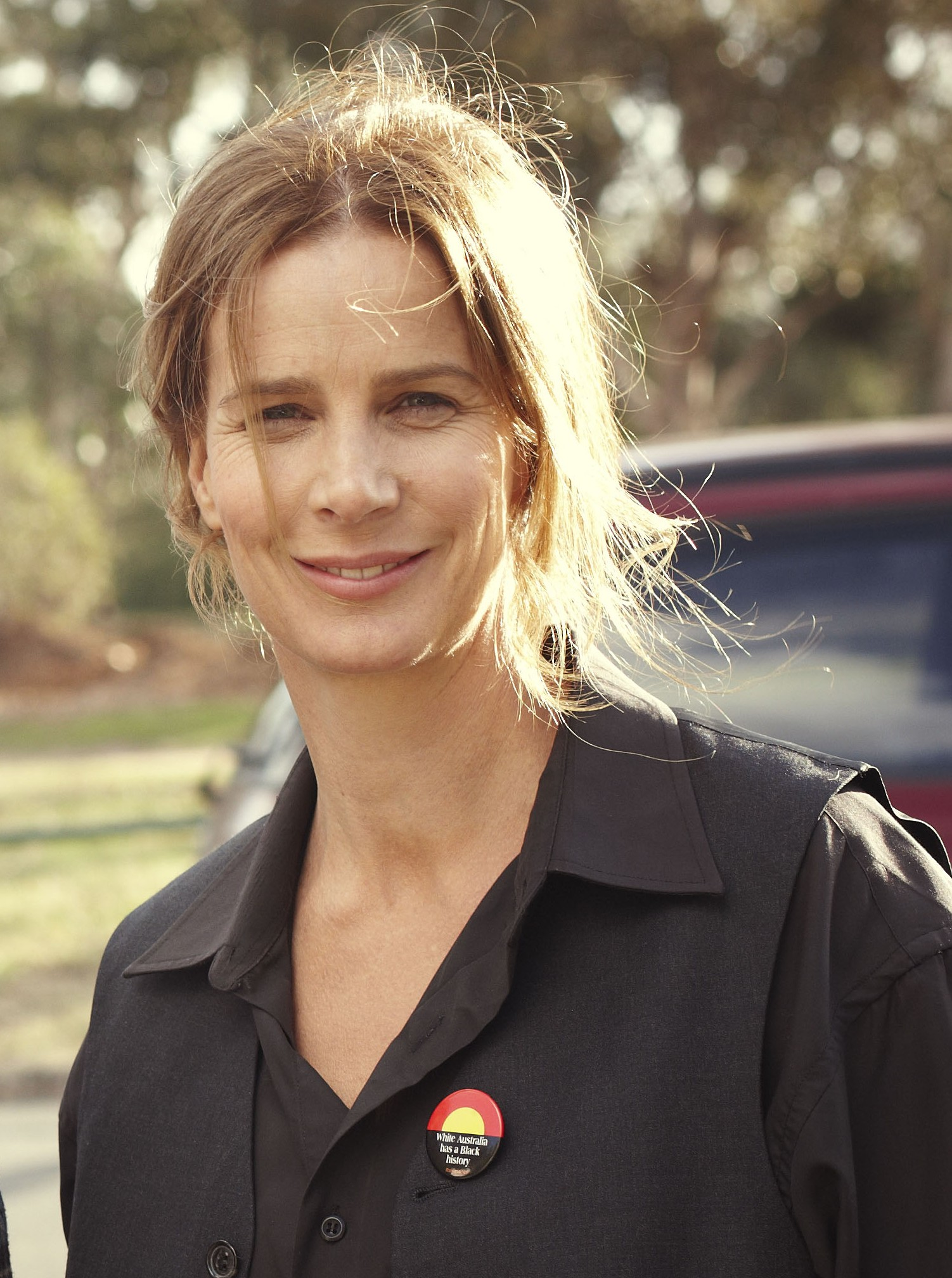
Rachel Griffiths, Best Supporting Actress – Drama winner

Best Drama Series: Total Control — Darren Dale, Miranda Dear, Rachel Griffiths; Bloom — David Maher, David Taylor, Glen Dolman, Sue Seeary; Mr Inbetween — Michele Bennett; Secret City: Under the Eagle — Stephen Corvini, Penny Chapman, Matt Cameron, Penny Win, Carly Heaton; Wentworth — Jo Porter, Pino Amenta	Best Telefeature, Mini Series or Short Run Series: Lambs of God — Jason Stephens, Helen Bowden, Sarah Lambert, Elisa Argenzio; The Cry — Claire Mundell, Brian Kaczynski, Stuart Menzies; Fighting Season — Kylie du Fresne, Blake Ayshford, Elisa Argenzio; The Hunting — Sophie Hyde, Lisa Scott, Rebecca Summerton; On the Ropes — Helen Bowden, Courtney Wise, Jason Stephens
Best Comedy Series: The Letdown — Linda Micsko, Julian Morrow, Sarah Scheller, Alison Bell; Frayed — Clelia Mountford, Sharon Horgan, Nicole O'Donohue, Kevin Whyte; Rosehaven — Andrew Walker, Kevin Whyte, Celia Pacquola, Luke McGregor; Sammy J — Sammy J, Michelle Buxton, Chris McDonald; Utopia — Santo Cilauro, Tom Gleisner, Rob Sitch, Michael Hirsh	Best Entertainment Program: Lego Masters — David McDonald, Eoin Maher, AJ Johnson; Australia's Got Talent — Digby Mitchell, David Briegel-Jones, Jonathon Summerhayes; Australian Ninja Warrior — Julie Ward, Amelia Fisk, Mark Barlin; Hard Quiz — Chris Walker, Kevin Whyte, Tom Gleeson, Charlie Pickering, John Tabbagh; The Masked Singer — Janine Cooper, Sean Kneale
Best Lifestyle Program: Love It or List It Australia — Karen Warner, Geoff Fitzpatrick, Howard Myers; Destination Flavour China — Olivia Hoopmann, Joshua Martin; Grand Designs Australia — Brooke Bayvel, Michael O'Neill; The Great Australian Bake Off — Nicole Rogers, David Briegel-Jones; Selling Houses Australia — Sally Joyce, Sonia Harding, Geoff Fitzpatrick	Best Reality Series: Australian Survivor: Champions v Contenders — Amelia Fisk, Adam Fergusson; The Block — Julian Cress, David Barbour; Married at First Sight — Tara McWilliams, Emma Lamb, Kate Feely; MasterChef Australia — Marty Benson, Adam Fergusson; My Kitchen Rules — Joe Herdman, David Dutton, Nicole Anthony, Therese Hegarty, Angus Ross
Best Children's Series: Bluey — Charlie Aspinwall, Daley Pearson, Sam Moor; Drop Dead Weird — Sally Browning, Monica O'Brien, Kylie Mascord; Hardball — Catherine Nebauer, Joe Weatherstone, Bernadette O'Mahony, Jan Stradling; The InBESTigators — Robyn Butler, Wayne Hope; The Unlisted — Angie Fielder, Polly Staniford, Justine Flynn	Best Teleplay: The Hunting — Niki Aken, Matthew Cormack – Episode 3; The Cry — Jacquelin Perske – Episode 2; Lambs of God — Sarah Lambert – Episode 1: The Devil into Paradise; Utopia — Santo Cilauro, Tom Gleisner, Rob Sitch – Episode 2
Best Lead Actor – Drama: Scott Ryan as Ray Shoesmith — Mr Inbetween; Patrick Brammall as Sgt. James Hayes — Glitch; Bryan Brown as Ray Reed — Bloom; Ewen Leslie as Alistair Robertson — The Cry; Sam Reid as Father Ignatius — Lambs of God	Best Lead Actress – Drama: Deborah Mailman as Alex Irving — Total Control; Jenna Coleman as Joanna Lindsay — The Cry; Essie Davis as Sister Iphigenia — Lambs of God; Ann Dowd as Sister Margarita — Lambs of God; Anna Torv as Harriet Dunkley — Secret City: Under the Eagle
Best Guest or Supporting Actor – Drama: Richard Roxburgh as Nick — The Hunting; Damon Herriman as Father Bob — Lambs of God; Damon Herriman as Freddy — Mr Inbetween; Ewen Leslie as Captain Edward "Ted" Nordenfelt — Fighting Season; John Stanton as Max McKinnon — Bloom	Best Guest or Supporting Actress – Drama: Rachel Griffiths as Rachel Anderson — Total Control; Kate Box as Lauren 'Lozza' Johnson — Les Norton; Asher Keddie as Alexandra — The Cry; Brooke Satchwell as Ally — Mr Inbetween; Jacki Weaver as Gwendolyn "Gwen" Reed — Bloom
Best Television Direction: Jeffrey Walker — Lambs of God – Episode 1: The Devil into Paradise; Ana Kokkinos — The Hunting – Episode 3: #shittyboys; Sarah Scheller, Alison Bell — The Letdown – Episode 2: The Dilemma; Rachel Perkins — Total Control – Episode 3	Best Non-Fiction Television Direction: Olivia Hoopmann — Destination Flavour China – Episode 1: Beijing; Richard Franc — Australian Survivor: Champions v Contenders – Episode 1; Jeff Siberry — Todd Sampson's Body Hack – Episode 1: Gaza Frontlines; Cian O'Clery — Employable Me – Episode 1: Eric, Kathleen & Paul
Best Cinematography in Television: Lambs of God — Donald McAlpine – Episode 1: The Devil into Paradise; The Cry — Sam Chiplin – Episode 2; Destination Flavour China — Gilbert Farkas – Episode 1: Beijing; Secret City: Under the Eagle — Mark Wareham – Episode 1: Run Little Rabbit	Best Editing in Television: The Cry — Alastair Reid – Episode 2; Lambs of God — Deborah Peart – Episode 1: The Devil into Paradise; Total Control — Deborah Peart – Episode 3; The Unlisted — Mat Evans – Episode 1
Best Sound in Television: Lambs of God — Nick Emond, Stephen Smith, Paul Devescovi, Mia Stewart – Episode 1: The Devil into Paradise; Todd Sampson's Body Hack — Damian Jory – Episode 1: Gaza Frontlines; Frayed — Mark Cornish, Ralph Ortner – Episode 1; Total Control — Nick Emond, Dane Cody, Luke Mynott, Wes Chew – Episode 3	Best Original Music Score in Television: Lambs of God — Bryony Marks – Episode 1: The Devil into Paradise; The Cry — Lorne Balfe – Episode 2; Frayed — Bryony Marks – Episode 1; The Unlisted — Diego Baldenweg, Nora Baldenweg, Lionel Vincent Baldenweg – Episode 1
Best Production Design in Television: Lambs of God — Chris Kennedy – Episode 1: The Devil into Paradise; Frayed — Fiona Donovan – Episode 1; The Letdown — Roslyn Durnford – Episode 2: The Dilemma; Secret City: Under the Eagle — Elizabeth Mary Moore – Episode 1: Run Little Rabbit	Best Costume Design in Television: Lambs of God — Xanthe Heubel – Episode 1: The Devil into Paradise; Frayed — Nina Edwards – Episode 1; Les Norton — Jenny Miles – Episode 1: You Wouldn't Be Dead for Quids; The Masked Singer — Tim Chappel – Episode 1: Face Off 1
Best Factual Entertainment Program: You Can't Ask That — Kirk Docker, Aaron Smith, Frances O'Riordan; Gogglebox Australia — David McDonald, Kerrie Kerr; Gruen — Nick Murray, Polly Connolly, Wil Anderson, Sarah Douglas; Todd Sampson's Body Hack — Chris Hilton, David Alrich, Todd Sampson; Who Do You Think You Are — Maxine Gray	Best Performance in a Television Comedy: Alison Bell — The Letdown; Celia Pacquola — Rosehaven; Celia Pacquola — Utopia; Rob Sitch — Utopia; Miranda Tapsell — Get Krack!n
Best Sports Entertainment Program: The Front Bar — Adrian Brown, Richard Molloy, Mick Molloy, Greg Sitch, Adam Rowe; AFL 360 — Tim Hodges, Tom Dullard; Bounce — Bill Cannon; On the Couch — Ben Roberts; Sunday Night with Matty Johns — Ben Churchill, Matty Johns, John Singleton	Best Sports Coverage: Test Cricket Live on Fox — Foxtel: Foxsports; Seven's Summer of Cricket — Seven Network; AFL — Foxtel: Foxsports; The Australian Open — Nine Network; State of Origin — Nine Network
Subscription Television Award for Best Male Presenter: Andrew Winter — Selling Houses Australia & Love It or List It Australia; Graeme Blundell — Screen; Ron Iddles — Ron Iddles: The Good Cop; Matty Johns — Sunday Night with Matty Johns and The Matty Johns Podcast; Peter Maddison — Grand Designs Australia	Subscription Television Award for Best Female Presenter: Yvonne Sampson — League Life & Fox League Game Day Hosting; Maggie Beer — The Great Australian Bake Off; Shaynna Blaze — Selling Houses Australia; Claire Hooper — The Great Australian Bake Off; Margaret Pomeranz — Screen
Subscription Television Award for Best Male New Talent: Chris Alosio — Fighting Season; Frederick du Rietz — Secret City: Under The Eagle; Fletcher Kennedy — Secret City: Under The Eagle; Diesel La Torraca — Lambs of God	Subscription Television Award for Best Female New Talent: Asha Boswarva — Lambs of God; Usha Cornish — Bloom; Paulene Gibson — Wentworth; Emma Lancaster — Lambs of God; Yvonne Rae — Lambs of God

== Documentary ==
Best Feature Length Documentary: The Australian Dream — Daniel Gordon, Sarah Thomson, Nick Batzias, Virginia Whitwell, John Battsek; The Eulogy — Janine Hosking, Katey Grusovin, Trish Lake; The Final Quarter — Ian Darling, Mary Macrae; In My Blood It Runs — Maya Newell, Sophie Hyde, Rachel Naninaaq Edwardson, Larissa Behrendt; Mystify: Michael Hutchence — Richard Lowenstein, Maya Gnyp, John Battsek, Sue Murray, Mark Fennessy, Lynn-Maree Milburn, Andrew de Groot	Best Documentary Television Program: Old People's Home for 4 Year Olds — Debbie Cuell, Brooke Hulsman; Australia in Colours — Jo-Anne McGowan, Jennifer Peedom; Employable Me — Karina Holden, Jenni Wilks; Exposed: The Case of Keli Lane — Caro Meldrum-Hanna, Jaya Balendra, Elise Worthington, Sue Spencer; Gatwick – The Last Chance Hotel — Jason Byrne
Best Editing in a Documentary: The Final Quarter — Sally Fryer; The Cult of The Family — Bill Murphy – Episode 1: Unseen, Uheard, Unknown; Exposed: The Case of Keli Lane — Lile Judickas; Mystify: Michael Hutchence — Richard Lowenstein, Lynn-Maree Milburn, Tayler Martin	Best Cinematography in a Documentary: Magical Land of Oz — Paul Bell, Dan Proud, Jon Shaw; 100 Days To Victory — Torstein Dyrting – Episode 1: The Spring Offensive; Finke: There and Back — Dylan River, Shane Mulcahy, Peter Beeh; In My Blood It Runs — Maya Newell
Best Original Music Score in a Documentary: 2040 — Bryony Marks; The Cult of The Family — Amanda Brown – Episode 1: Unseen, Uheard, Unknown; The Leunig Fragments — Luke Altmann; Martha: A Picture Story — Adit Gauchan, Vincent Goodyer	Best Sound in a Documentary: 100 Days To Victory – Episode 1: The Spring Offensive – Ric Curtin, Xoe Baird, Laurie Chlanda, Adrian Tucker; Defend, Conserve, Protect — Chris Goodes; Don't Stop The Music — Ric Curtin, Glenn Martin, Ben Ohayon, Gavin Fernie, Ash Charlton; Mystify: Michael Hutchence — Robert Mackenzie, Mick Boraso, Simon Rosenberg, Lynn-Maree Milburn

== Short form ==
Best Short Fiction Film: The Egg — Jane Cho, Ilana Lazar; Rebooted — Michael Shanks, Nicholas Colla, Chris Hocking; Snare — Madeleine Gottlieb, Tom Slater; Yulubidyi – Until The End — Curtis Taylor, Nathan Mewett, Glen Stasiuk	Best Short Animation: Pinchpot — Greg Holfeld; Jasper — Simon Rippingale, Alessandra Grasso; Sohrab And Rustum — Lee Whitmore; Sole — Yori Narpati, Erika Ju, Quynh Truong
Best Online Drama or Comedy: Robbie Hood — Dylan River, Tanith Glynn-Maloney, Meg O'Connell, Charlie Aspinwall; Aunty Donna: Glennridge Secondary College — Katherine Dale, Rachel Millar, Max Miller; Content — Meg O'Connell, Daley Pearson, Jackson Lapsley Scott, Anna Barnes; Koala Man — Michael Cusack, Mike Cowap; Over and Out — Adele Vuko, Christiaan Van Vuuren, Bridget Callow-Wright, Gemma Knight, Abi Tabone	Best Online Entertainment: Wengie; Bounce Patrol — Shannon Jones; CKN Toys; Georgia Productions; HowToBasic; Ozzy Man Reviews; Primitive Technology — John Plant
Best Short Documentary: Home Front: Facing Australia's Climate Emergency — Luke Taylor; Demonic — Pia Borg, Anna Vincent, Bonnie McBride; War Mothers: Unbreakable — Stefan Bugryn, Steven Zelko; Woven Threads — Michi Marosszeky, Paul Sullivan

== Additional awards ==
Best Asian Film
- Parasite (South Korea) — Bong Joon-ho, Young-Hwan Jang, Yang-kwon Moon, Kwak Sin-ae
  - Andhadhun (India) — Sriram Raghavan, Sanjay Rautray, Keval Garg
  - Gully Boy (India) — Zoya Akhtar, Ritesh Sidhwani, Farhan Akhtar
  - Hello, Love, Goodbye (Philippines) — Cathy Garcia-Molina, Carlo L. Katigbak
  - Ne Zha (China) — Jiao Zi, Wei Yunyun, Liu Wenzhang
  - Shadow (China) — Zhang Yimou, Ellen Eliasoph, Zhang Zhao, Pang Liwei, Liu Jun, Wang Xiaozhu
  - Super Deluxe (India) — Thiagarajan Kumararaja, S. D. Ezhilmathy
  - The Wandering Earth (China) — Frant Gwo, Gong Geer, Wang Hong
  - We Are Little Zombies (Japan) — Taihei Yamanishi, Shinichi Takahashi

== Individual awards ==
The Longford Lyell Award: Sam Neill	The Byron Kennedy Award: P. J. Voeten
