= Drift (2013 Australian film) =

- Theatrical film poster
- Directed by: Morgan O'Neill; Ben Nott
- Screenplay by: Morgan O'Neill
- Story by: Morgan O'Neill; Tim Duffy
- Produced by: Michele Bennett; Tim Duffy; Myles Pollard
- Starring: Sam Worthington; Xavier Samuel; Myles Pollard; Lesley-Ann Brandt
- Cinematography: Geoffrey Hall
- Edited by: Marcus D'Arcy
- Music by: Michael Yezerski
- Production companies: Screen Australia; World Wide Mind Films
- Distributed by: Hopscotch
- Release dates: 2 May 2013 (Australia); 2 August 2013 (United States)
- Running time: 113 minutes
- Country: Australia
- Language: English
- Budget: $11.4 million

Drift is a 2013 Australian surf film co-directed by Morgan O'Neill and Ben Nott based on the birth of the surfing industry in the 1970s. It was shot in Western Australia and stars Sam Worthington, Xavier Samuel, and Myles Pollard.

== Plot ==
In the late 1960s, two young brothers in Sydney escape a violent household with their mother, Kat, by stealing the family car as her partner sleeps. They cross the continent intending to hide out and make a new start in distant Albany, Western Australia.

Arriving south of Perth on the West Coast, they spot a perfect surf break and convince Kat to settle instead in a caravan park in Seacliffe. The kids attend a local school while their mother does piecework as a sewist.

Years later, in 1972, they are young adults living with their mum in a run-down house she bought by the beach. Older brother Andy works in a timber mill while surf prodigy Jimmy wins the 1972 Seacliffe Amateur surf title – but away from his sport, he is listless and involved in petty crime.

Determined to escape their lack of prospects, headstrong Andy and his brother form a volatile alliance. Andy sees a gap in the market and fashions custom-made wetsuits sewed by Kat and new short surfboards in their backyard garage. Eventually, they attract some sales, although they are refused a bank loan to develop the business.

JB, an infamous itinerant surf filmmaker, and Lani, his Hawaiian companion, drive into town in a converted school bus towing a Mini Moke. The brothers start a business called Drift, and their troubles with a drug-dealing biker gang begin to escalate.

JB embodies the era's anti-establishment vibe and is skeptical of Andy's interest in expanding his business. However, he soon realizes that if the brothers can survive and stay true to their surfing roots, they might be part of something greater.

The fledgling business generates a powerful buzz among the hard-core local surfers, but when shooting publicity shots, Jimmy is towed onto a massive wave at a surf break called "the Morgue." Tensions arise as their boat capsizes and JB's expensive waterproof camera is lost.

The brothers’ progressive ideas further annoy the conservative locals and particularly the police, and they also find themselves embroiled in a violent feud with the bikers. The gang leader, Miller, uses a heroin-addicted surfer, Gus, to import kilos of heroin concealed in an order of surfboard blanks to the Drift surf shop.

But the drugs are discovered by the brothers and flushed away by Andy, imperiling their and Gus's lives when the gang discovers that they have no product and an enormous debt to suppliers. Gus, after trying to quit drugs, commits suicide by paddling out into the surf. Andy's growing relationship with Lani causes friction between the brothers and JB.

The town hosts a pro surf competition, which Andy enters with the intention of using the prize money to pay the bikers back. But Jimmy, a better surfer, returns from introspection (where he was also hiding out from the gang, fearing for his life) and replaces his brother.

Jimmy gets to the competition final with a Hawaiian pro. In the last 60 seconds, Jimmy, who is losing points, catches a huge wave, surfs a long barrel, and is photographed by JB (who has located and fixed his camera) doing a hands-off aerial. He then wipes out, gets injured on an underwater reef, and loses the competition after Andy saves him.

Without any money to pay the bikers, Kay agrees to sell the family house to the bank manager for a low price. The brothers drive to the surf shop and discover that it is packed with customers and looked after by Lani. JB's photo on the front page of the local newspaper, with the headline 'The future of surfing', brought in this business. With money suddenly rolling in, Andy rips up and burns the house sale deed in front of the banker.

Jimmy is invited to join the world pro surf tour. He reluctantly agrees to go and discover the world, encouraged by JB, who lets it slip that Miller, the leader of the biker gang, has been arrested – JB secretly planted Indonesian hash in his house and tipped off the police. Andy, Lani, and Kat wave as JB starts his bus and drives out of town to unknown future surf breaks.

== Cast ==
- Xavier Samuel as Jimmy
- Myles Pollard as Andy
- Sam Worthington as JB
- Lesley-Ann Brandt as Lani
- Robyn Malcolm as Kat
- Maurie Ogden as Percy
- Aaron Glenane as Gus
- Sean Keenan as young Andy
- Steve Bastoni as Miller

== Production ==
Tim Duffy wrote an early script in 2007. Myles Pollard became attached as actor and producer and asked Sam Worthington, with whom he had attended Drama School, to star. Worthington expressed interest but, at the time, could not commit given his international film schedule. Morgan O'Neill wrote the screenplay and became co-director with Ben Nott. Worthington became available and agreed to play a support role, and funding was obtained from Screen Australia, Screen West, Screen NSW, Tourism WA, and Fulcrum Media Finance. Shooting took 31 days in August–September 2011 in southwest Western Australia.

== Box office ==
The film was released in Australia in early 2013. On its opening weekend, it earned $268,570 at the box office, making an average of $1,918 across 140 screens.

== Film festivals ==
- Official selection Hamptons Film Festival 2013
- Official selection Newport Beach Film Festival 2013
- Official selection Maui International Film Festival 2013
- Official selection Rincon International Film Festival 2013

== Awards ==
Award	Category	Subject	Result
AACTA Awards (3rd)	Best Original Screenplay	Morgan O'Neill	Nominated
AACTA Awards (3rd)	Best Cinematography	Geoffrey Hall	Nominated
AACTA Awards (3rd)	Best Original Music Score	Michael Yezerski	Nominated
AWGIE Award	Best Writing in a Feature Film – Original	Morgan O'Neill	Nominated
AWGIE Award	Best Writing in a Feature Film – Original	Tim Duffy	Nominated
FCCA Awards	Best Actor	Sam Worthington	Nominated
FCCA Awards	Best Cinematography	Geoffrey Hall	Nominated
Maui Film Festival	Extreme Cinemas Award		Won
Newport Beach Film Festival	Outstanding Achievement in Filmmaking		Won
Rincon International Film Festival	Best Film		Won
Rincon International Film Festival	Best of the Fest		Won
Rincon International Film Festival	Audience Choice Award		Won
West Australian Screen Award	Best Actor	Myles Pollard	Won

== Critical response ==
On review aggregator Rotten Tomatoes, the film holds an approval rating of 32% based on 19 reviews, with an average rating of 4.65/10. On Metacritic, the film has a weighted average score of 35 out of 100, based on 10 critics, indicating "generally unfavourable reviews". However, some Australian critic's responses were positive.
