= Judy and Punch =

2019 film

- Theatrical release poster
- Directed by: Mirrah Foulkes
- Screenplay by: Mirrah Foulkes
- Story by: Mirrah Foulkes; Eddy Moretti; Lucy Punch; Tom Punch
- Produced by: Michele Bennett; Nash Edgerton; Danny Gabai
- Starring: Mia Wasikowska; Damon Herriman; Tom Budge; Benedict Hardie; Gillian Jones; Terry Norris; Brenda Palmer; Lucy Velik; Scarlett Dixon; Summer Dixon
- Cinematography: Stefan Duscio
- Edited by: Dany Cooper
- Music by: François Tétaz
- Production companies: Blue-Tongue Films; Vice Media; Pariah Productions; Screen Australia; Film Victoria
- Distributed by: Madman Entertainment
- Release dates: 27 January 2019 (Sundance); 21 November 2019 (Australia)
- Running time: 105 minutes
- Country: Australia
- Language: English
- Box office: $197,719

Judy and Punch is a 2019 Australian period black comedy film written and directed by Mirrah Foulkes in her feature directorial debut, based on a story by Foulkes, Eddy Moretti, Lucy Punch, and Tom Punch. Starring Mia Wasikowska, Damon Herriman, Tom Budge, Gillian Jones, and Terry Norris. Judy and Punch premiered at the Sundance Film Festival on 27 January 2019. The film was theatrically released in Australia on 21 November 2019, to positive reviews from critics. Herriman won the AACTA Award for Best Actor in a Leading Role, and François Tétaz's soundtrack won AACTA Award for Best Original Music Score and Best Soundtrack Album in the APRA Music Awards of 2020.

== Plot ==
Judy and Punch are puppeteers in the town of Seaside, England who, alongside their baby daughter, are attempting to bring their marionette show back into the public eye. Judy wins the crowd with her puppetry but Punch suffers from a drinking problem. While chasing a little dog that has stolen a string of sausages, Punch trips and accidentally throws their baby out of a high window, killing her. Judy is incredulous when Punch casually admits to dropping their baby out of a window, then she punches him, and he retaliates with his walking stick, beating her.

Punch believes he has killed Judy, hides her body, reports the crime to the local constable, and implicates their two elderly servants, Scaramouche and Maude, who had raised Judy since she was a child. Maude and Scaramouche are arrested and Punch tells the whole town of their guilt of murder and subsequent cannibalism of his daughter.

Judy is found unconscious and taken to live in a secret society of outcasts in the forest. When she recovers she swears vengeance on Punch, part of which is terrorising him, including by visiting Punch in their house with a large puppet representing a ghost that demands he repent and clear the name of the falsely accused couple or a worse fate will come to him.

On the hanging scaffold, Punch appears to recant, saying that the pair are not guilty, but he continues his speech saying that it is not they but the Devil who is guilty and who is being dealt with by the hanging and he works the crowd into a bloodlust. However, when he pulls the trapdoor lever, the pair fall to the ground as their ropes have been cut. Judy and the forest troupe arrive. Punch is lassoed about each wrist and hung from the scaffold while Judy approaches him with a large axe, saying serious crime deserves serious punishment, and she cuts his hands off.

Some while later, Judy is seen living at her house with her companions. Punch is confined to an insane asylum where he puts on a mad Punch and Judy puppet show watched through the window by a few people on the street outside.

== Cast ==
- Mia Wasikowska as Judy
- Damon Herriman as Punch
- Benedict Hardie as Derrick Fairweather
- Tom Budge as Mr. Frankly
- Gillian Jones as Dr. Goodtime
- Eddie Baroo as Nordic Man
- Virginia Gay as Ma
- Kiruna Stamell as Mavis
- Lucy Velik as Polly
- Terry Norris as Scaramouche
- Brenda Palmer as Maid Maude
- Jacek Koman as Singer
- Scarlett and Summer Dixon as The Baby

== Production ==
In October 2017, it was announced Mia Wasikowska had joined the cast of the film, with Mirrah Foulkes directing from a screenplay she wrote. In April 2018, Damon Herriman joined the cast of the film.

The score was composed by François Tétaz.

== Release ==
The film had its world premiere at the Sundance Film Festival on 27 January 2019. Shortly after, Samuel Goldwyn Films acquired U.S. distribution rights to the film. It was released in Australia on 21 November 2019, and was scheduled to be released in the United States on 5 June 2020.

=== Reception ===
Judy and Punch received positive reception from critics. It holds a 77% rating from 138 critic reviews on review aggregator website Rotten Tomatoes, with an average of 6.6/10. The site's critical consensus reads, "Judy & Punch revisits classic characters from a fresh perspective, marking debuting writer-director Mirrah Foulkes as a filmmaking talent to watch." On Metacritic, the film has a weighted average rating of 59 out of 100, based on 23 critics, indicating "mixed or average reviews".

=== Accolades ===
The film was nominated for the World Cinema Jury Prize at Sundance Film Festival.

Award	Category	Subject	Result	Ref
AACTA Awards (9th)	Best Film	Michele Bennett	Nominated	
AACTA Awards (9th)	Best Film	Nash Edgerton	Nominated	
AACTA Awards (9th)	Best Film	Danny Gabai	Nominated	
AACTA Awards (9th)	Best Direction	Mirrah Foulkes	Nominated	
AACTA Awards (9th)	Best Screenplay, Original or Adapted	Mirrah Foulkes	Nominated	
AACTA Awards (9th)	Best Actor	Damon Herriman	Won	
AACTA Awards (9th)	Best Actress	Mia Wasikowska	Nominated	
AACTA Awards (9th)	Best Editing	Dany Cooper	Nominated	
AACTA Awards (9th)	Best Original Music Score	François Tétaz	Won	
AACTA Awards (9th)	Best Production Design	Jo Ford	Nominated	
AACTA Awards (9th)	Best Costume Design	Edie Kurzer	Nominated	
APRA Music Awards of 2020	Best Soundtrack Album	François Tétaz	Won	
