= The Magician (2005 film) =

- Theatrical release poster
- Directed by: Scott Ryan
- Written by: Scott Ryan
- Produced by: Michele Bennett; Nash Edgerton; Mark Vennis
- Starring: Scott Ryan; Ben Walker; Massimiliano Andrighetto
- Cinematography: Massimiliano Andrighetto
- Edited by: Scott Ryan; Nash Edgerton
- Production companies: I Will Films; Blue-Tongue Films
- Distributed by: Hopscotch Productions; Trinity Filmed Entertainment
- Release date: 18 June 2005 (Sydney Film Festival)
- Running time: 85 minutes
- Country: Australia
- Language: English
- Budget: A$3,000
- Box office: A$182,164

The Magician is a 2005 Australian film written and directed by Scott Ryan. It is a found footage crime comedy drama in which a hitman (Ryan), is filmed as he goes about his daily life as a career criminal. The film was originally shot over 10 days with a budget of A$3,000. Ryan edited a half-hour version of the film for screening at the St. Kilda Film Festival, where it was seen by stuntman and film producer Nash Edgerton, who took the project under his wing. After receiving A$330,000 in government grants, the film was re-released in 2005.

A television series serialisation of the film, Mr Inbetween, aired on FX for 26 episodes across three seasons from 2018 to 2021, with Ryan reprising his role.

== Plot ==
Through the lens of a documentary, criminally amoral film student Massimo "Max" Totti follows the escapades of Ray Shoesmith, a Melbourne underworld hitman who has hired him to document his life. Max films Ray meeting with his friend Benny to convince him to leave the state to avoid his imminent execution for talking to the cops, paying him to travel to Sydney and set up there. On leaving Benny, Ray explains how they used to be close, Benny having been a drug dealer for their boss Freddy, before he had started using his own supply and they began to move in different circles. On being asked, Ray continues to tell Max about how he became a hitman– having been in the army for eight years before being discharged for having "a bit of a problem" with a superior officer. He then goes into detail on how he makes his targets "disappear" and only be considered missing persons, leading to no murder investigations being opened into their deaths, and how he believes making the drug trade legal would probably reduce the amount of crime in Australia by 75%. Ray also talks about how his ex-wife has recently remarried, and he sees their daughter less and less. Later, after Ray explains his plan of action for capturing a new target, he and Max stake out in said target's garage, Max filming as Ray shoots the target multiple times on closing his garage door. Later, when talking with Ray, Max casually mentions how a former "junkie" roommate of his, Edna, had stolen Max's television, stereo and "everything" he had in his apartment, but he could never prove it, and Ray offers to retrieve it, travelling to his house and "talking" to him, forcing Edna to return what he stole from Max with the "least amount of violence necessary" (involving knocking him in the face with a baseball bat). After Ray tells Edna he will have one week to pay back $2,000 for the items of Max's that Edna had already sold, Edna skips town without paying, and Max notes that Edna is listed as a missing person (implying Ray killed him). Sometime later, angry after finding out that Benny has moved back home after a few weeks in Sydney, Ray offers to drive him wherever he wishes to go. After casually bringing Benny to the middle of the wilderness in the state he wanted to go to, Ray shoots Benny in the back of the head while he is stopping to relieve himself on the side of the road. While burying Benny with Max, Ray tells him it was better that he had done it as a friend before Benny was painfully killed by those actually after him.

Later in the year, Ray explains to Max his plan to grab 23-year-old Tony Richards, who owes millions to Ray's boss Freddy, who has explicitly ordered Ray to "make him disappear". After Ray grabs Tony when he leaves his apartment, he has Tony handcuff himself before moving him into the car boot to be driven into the desert for execution. As Ray drives, he and Max talk about the film The Dirty Dozen, which Ray believes Clint Eastwood had a role in; after Max bets a thousand that he isn't in it and Ray is mixing films up, Ray briefly opens the boot to ask Tony his thoughts, before locking him back in after he confirms Max to be correct. On reaching remote bushland, Ray gets out of the car and has Tony dig his own grave, which he does slowly over the course of many hours. While begging for his life, Tony reveals he has a stash of $80,000 he kept from Freddy, offering to show Ray where to dig it up in exchange for not being executed. After Max points out it couldn't hurt to check, Ray agrees to drive across the country with Tony to where the money is buried. On the journey, Max talks with Tony in the backseat, where he tells him about his own daughter. On a stop later, Max goes in to buy food for Ray and Tony at a fast food place, and the two discuss the price of cars, before eating the lunch outside. The trio then begin to have casual conversations in the car, before stopping at a hotel overnight. As Ray showers, Max assures Tony that he thinks Ray will not kill him after he gets the money, while refusing to let him go now. Privately talking to Max, Ray admits he has not made up his mind yet on whether or not to kill Tony after getting the money, adding that while he doesn't think he will there's no guarantee he won't, just as Max had said to Tony earlier. The next day, on reaching the remote farmhouse under which Tony says the money is buried, Tony reveals it is actually a half kilo of cocaine he had buried, hurriedly saying it is probably actually worth $100,000 while justifying why he said it was cash due to the circumstances. Appreciating his present honesty, Ray accepts the cocaine as payment and lets Tony go; Max notes Tony later moved to Queensland where he reconciled with his estranged wife and daughter.

Sometime later, before seeing Max off, Ray reveals he had him make the documentary to be released in the event of his death, and that while he is alive at the moment of filming, he will be dead by the time Max (who has had his face pixelated the entire film) releases the film. On Max's suggestion, Ray decides to leave a message for those watching to "enjoy the show". As Ray walks away from Max to the airport, the final postscript reveals Ray was shot dead outside his home five months after the documentary was completed.

== Cast ==
- Scott Ryan as Raymond John "Ray" Shoesmith
- Ben Walker as Tony Richards
- Massimiliano Andrighetto as Massimo "Max" Totti
- Kane Mason as Benjamin Thomas "Benny" Mason
- Nathaniel Lindsay as Edna

== Box office ==
The Magician grossed $182,164 at the box office in Australia.

== Reception ==
The film holds a 75% approval rating from critics based on 16 reviews at Rotten Tomatoes.

== Awards and nominations ==
Film Critics Circle of Australia Awards

| Year | Category | Recipients | Result |
|---|---|---|---|
| 2005 | Best Actor in a Lead Role | Scott Ryan | Nominated |

IF Awards

| Year | Category | Recipients | Result |
|---|---|---|---|
| 2005 | Best Actor | Scott Ryan | Nominated |
| 2005 | Independent Spirit Award | Nash Edgerton, Scott Ryan, Michele Bennett | Nominated |

Melbourne Underground Film Festival

| Year | Category | Recipients | Result |
|---|---|---|---|
| 2003 | Best Actor | Scott Ryan | Won |
| 2003 | Best Director | Scott Ryan | Won |
| 2003 | Best Film | Scott Ryan | Won |

== Spinoff series ==
A television spinoff based on the Ray Shoesmith character premiered on FX in 2018 titled Mr Inbetween. Ryan reprised his role, and served as writer and producer on the show. Nash Edgerton also served as producer and directed every episode. The show ran for 3 seasons and drew critical acclaim.

== See also ==
- Cinema of Australia
