= List of 2000 box office number-one films in Australia =

This is a list of films which placed number-one at the weekend box office in Australia during 2000. Amounts are in Australian dollars.

Seemingly improper dates are due to holiday weekends or other occasions. N/A denotes information that is not available from Urban Cinefile nor Movie Marshal.

== Number-one films ==
| † | This implies the highest-grossing movie of the year. |

| # | Weekend End Date | Film | Box office | Notes |
|---|---|---|---|---|
| 1 | 9 January 2000 | Double Jeopardy | $2,703,832 | |
| 2 | 16 January 2000 | Double Jeopardy | $1,762,631 | |
| 3 | 23 January 2000 | Three Kings | $1,304,758 | |
| 4 | 30 January 2000 | American Beauty | $1,944,345 | |
| 5 | 6 February 2000 | American Beauty | $1,575,589 | |
| 6 | 13 February 2000 | The Green Mile | $2,257,160 | |
| 7 | 20 February 2000 | The Green Mile | $1,747,907 | |
| 8 | 27 February 2000 | The Wog Boy | $2,033,549 | |
| 9 | 5 March 2000 | The Wog Boy | $1,678,718 | |
| 10 | 12 March 2000 | The Beach | $1,866,711 | |
| 11 | 19 March 2000 | The Hurricane | $1,568,327 | |
| 12 | 26 March 2000 | Scream 3 | $2,527,959 | |
| 13 | 2 April 2000 | The Whole Nine Yards | $1,312,665 | |
| 14 | 9 April 2000 | Stuart Little | $2,865,868 | |
| 15 | 16 April 2000 | Stuart Little | $3,004,233 | |
| 16 | 23 April 2000 | Stuart Little | $4,189,473 | |
| 17 | 30 April 2000 | Stuart Little | $2,152,764 | |
| 18 | 7 May 2000 | Gladiator † | $5,927,458 | |
| 19 | 14 May 2000 | Gladiator † | $4,303,311 | |
| 20 | 21 May 2000 | Gladiator † | $3,311,644 | |
| 21 | 28 May 2000 | Gladiator † | $2,498,792 | |
| 22 | 4 June 2000 | Mission: Impossible 2 | $6,395,638 | Mission: Impossible 2 had a record opening (4-day) weekend for United International Pictures |
| 23 | 11 June 2000 | Mission: Impossible 2 | $4,871,668 | |
| 24 | 18 June 2000 | Mission: Impossible 2 | $2,077,716 | |
| 25 | 25 June 2000 | Me, Myself & Irene | $1,653,434 | |
| 26 | 2 July 2000 | Gone in 60 Seconds | $3,647,726 | |
| 27 | 9 July 2000 | Gone in 60 Seconds | $2,312,064 | |
| 28 | 16 July 2000 | X-Men | $3,608,778 | |
| 29 | 23 July 2000 | The Patriot | $2,807,660 | |
| 30 | 30 July 2000 | The Patriot | $1,852,896 | |
| 31 | 6 August 2000 | Chopper | $1,258,717 | |
| 32 | 13 August 2000 | Shanghai Noon | $1,599,104 | |
| 33 | 20 August 2000 | Shanghai Noon | $964,607 | |
| 34 | 27 August 2000 | Road Trip | $1,777,893 | |
| 35 | 3 September 2000 | Scary Movie | $2,672,930 | |
| 36 | 10 September 2000 | Scary Movie | $1,862,177 | |
| 37 | 17 September 2000 | Scary Movie | $1,057,848 | |
| 38 | 24 September 2000 | Big Momma's House | $1,031,484 | Big Momma's House reached number one in its second week of release |
| 39 | 1 October 2000 | The Kid | $1,041,810 | |
| 40 | 8 October 2000 | Space Cowboys | $1,135,346 | |
| 41 | 15 October 2000 | The Dish | $1,266,619 | Preview grosses |
| 42 | 22 October 2000 | The Dish | $2,995,500 | The Dish had a record opening weekend (four-day) for an Australian film |
| 43 | 29 October 2000 | The Dish | $2,552,609 | |
| 44 | 5 November 2000 | What Lies Beneath | $2,111,259 | |
| 45 | 12 November 2000 | What Lies Beneath | $1,620,659 | |
| 46 | 19 November 2000 | What Lies Beneath | $1,158,427 | |
| 47 | 26 November 2000 | Charlie's Angels | $4,045,389 | |
| 48 | 3 December 2000 | Charlie's Angels | $2,691,859 | |
| 49 | 10 December 2000 | Chicken Run | $2,031,541 | |
| 50 | 17 December 2000 | Chicken Run | $1,564,374 | |
| 51 | 24 December 2000 | Vertical Limit | N/A | Vertical Limit grossed $6,162,186 for the week ended 27 December |
| 52 | 31 December 2000 | Meet the Parents | $5,042,972 | |

== See also ==
- List of Australian films — Australian films by year
