= Hearts and Bones (film) =

2019 film by Ben Lawrence

- Film poster
- Directed by: Ben Lawrence
- Screenplay by: Beatrix Christian; Ben Lawrence
- Produced by: Matt Reeder
- Starring: Hugo Weaving; Andrew Luri; Hayley McElhinney; Bolude Watson
- Cinematography: Hugh Miller
- Edited by: Phillip Horn
- Music by: Rafael May
- Production company: Night Kitchen Productions
- Distributed by: Madman Entertainment
- Release date: 15 June 2019 (Sydney Film Festival)
- Running time: 111 minutes
- Country: Australia
- Language: English

Hearts and Bones is a 2019 Australian drama film directed and co-written by Ben Lawrence. The film follows a war photographer and a refugee. It stars Hugo Weaving, Andrew Luri, Hayley McElhinney, and Bolude Watson.

== Cast ==
- Hugo Weaving as Dan Fisher
- Andrew Luri as Sebastian Ahmed
- Hayley McElhinney as Josie Avril
- Bolude Watson as Anishka Ahmed
- Toni Scanlan as Ada Williams
- Ling Cooper Tang as Ruth

== Production ==
Hearts and Bones was directed and co-written by Ben Lawrence, and produced by Matt Reeder. It was co-written by Beatrix Christian.

Cinematography was by Hugh Miller, while Phillip Horn was responsible for editing the film. The score was composed by Rafael May.

== Release ==
Hearts and Bones premiered at the Sydney Film Festival on 15 June 2019, and was then shown at a number of film festivals in 2019. It was originally slated for an April 2020 release into Australian cinemas; however, the release was cancelled due to the COVID-19 pandemic in Australia, which forced the shutdown of the many cinemas for some time. Instead of delaying the theatrical release, the film opted instead to release directly onto digital platforms on 6 May 2020.

The home-video release was planned for 3 June 2020.

== Reception ==
=== Critical response ===
On review aggregator Rotten Tomatoes, Hearts and Bones has an 82% approval rating, based on 28 reviews The site's critical consensus reads, "Hearts and Bones is more powerful in concept than execution, although strong work from a deftly assembled cast adds much-needed heft."

Variety's Eddie Cockrell called it "an impressive narrative feature debut". Harry Windsor from The Hollywood Reporter gave his bottom line as "A drama about good intentions that pulls up just short of the abyss." Sarah Ward from Screen Daily wrote "An intimate film tackling an expansive subject — the treatment of refugees around the globe, and the way the world processes the traumas that lead to such urgent, widespread immigration — this is a poignant and morally complex drama".

=== Accolades ===
Members of the cast received three nominations at the 9th AACTA Awards. Hugo Weaving was nominated for Best Actor, Andrew Luri for Best Supporting Actor, and Bolude Watson for Best Supporting Actress.

At the 20th Fargo Film Festival, it won Best Narrative Feature and Best Actor for Hugo Weaving.
