= Shark (2021 film) =

- Directed by: Nash Edgerton
- Written by: Nash Edgerton; David Michôd
- Produced by: Michele Bennett
- Cinematography: Aaron McLisky
- Edited by: David Whittaker
- Release date: 2021
- Running time: 14 minutes
- Country: Australia
- Language: English

Shark is a 2021 Australian comedy short film directed by Nash Edgerton. It was produced by Michele Bennett.

== Cast ==
- Nash Edgerton as Jack
- Rose Byrne as Sofie
- Krew Boylan as Bridesmaid
- Elly Hiraani Clapin as Tourist
- Laurence Coy as Jack's Dad
- Kieran Darcy-Smith as Captain Rick
- Brendan Donoghue as Gary
- Vanessa Downing as Jack's Mum
- Zumi Edgerton as Flower Girl
- Joseph Fala as Island Waiter
- Dylan Hare as Bae
- Glenn Hazeldine as Celebrant
- Mia Healey as Darlin'
- Madeleine Levins as Dental Nurse
- Hamish Michael as Best Man
- Tiriel Mora as Sofie's Dad
- Philip Partridge as Tourist
- Ioane Saula as Ziggy
- Natalie Tran as Dentist

== Awards ==
Since its launch, the film has been selected in various festivals

Year	Ceremony	Award/Category	Status
2021	Toronto International Film Festival	Short Cuts Award	Nominated
2021	AFI Fest	Live Action Short Film	Nominated
2021	Sydney Film Festival	Dendy Awards Shorts	Nominated
2021	Tallinn Black Nights Film Festival	International Live Action	Nominated
2021	Calgary International Film Festival	Telus Audience Choice Award	Nominated
2021	Ajyal Youth Film Festival	Audience Award	Nominated
2021	Cinemaforum Short Film Festival	Best Live Action Short	Nominated
2021	Cork International Film Festival	Short Film	Nominated
2021	PÖFF Shorts	International Short Film Competition	Nominated
2021	The Short Com International Film Fest	Best Live Action Short	Nominated
2021	Abitibi-Témiscamingue International Festival	Short Film	Nominated
