= Andrew Luri =

Sudanese-Australian actor

Andrew Luri is a Sudanese-Australian actor. He made his acting debut in the film Hearts and Bones (2019), for which he was nominated for an AACTA Award.

== Life ==
Luri migrated from South Sudan to Australia on a humanitarian visa in 2003.

== Filmography ==
=== Film ===
| Year | Title | Role |
|---|---|---|
| 2019 | Hearts and Bones | Sebastian Ahmed |

== Awards and nominations ==
| Year | Award | Category | Work | Result |
|---|---|---|---|---|
| 2019 | 50th International Film Festival of India | Best Actor (Appreciation Award) | Hearts and Bones | Won |
| 2019 | 9th AACTA Awards | Best Actor in a Supporting Role | Hearts and Bones | Nominated |
