= Chopper (film) =

2000 film by Andrew Dominik

- Theatrical release poster
- Directed by: Andrew Dominik
- Screenplay by: Andrew Dominik
- Story by: Mark "Chopper" Read
- Produced by: Michele Bennett
- Starring: Eric Bana; Vince Colosimo; Simon Lyndon; Kate Beahan; David Field
- Cinematography: Geoffrey Hall; Kevin Hayward
- Edited by: Ken Sallows
- Music by: Mick Harvey
- Production companies: Australian Film Finance Corporation; Mushroom Pictures; Pariah Entertainment Group
- Distributed by: Mushroom Pictures
- Release date: 3 August 2000
- Running time: 94 minutes
- Country: Australia
- Language: English
- Box office: A$6.8 million

Chopper is a 2000 Australian crime drama film written and directed by Andrew Dominik, in his feature directorial debut, based on the autobiographical books by the criminal turned author Mark "Chopper" Read. The film stars Eric Bana as the title character and co-stars Vince Colosimo, Simon Lyndon, Kate Beahan and David Field. The film follows Read's life and time in prison. The film grossed $6.8 million worldwide and received positive reviews. It has since garnered a cult following.

== Plot ==
In 1978 Victoria, Mark "Chopper" Read is an inmate at Pentridge Prison. Keithy George, another inmate, points to a line in the yard and tells Mark not to cross the line as it marks the Painters and Dockers' territory. The next day, Mark rushes across the line and stabs Keithy multiple times.

The Painters and Dockers put out a $10,000 bounty on Mark. Mark conscripts Bluey Barnes and Jimmy Loughnan to help him lead a siege on the Painters and Dockers. Wanting out of the suicide mission, Jimmy shanks Mark. Jimmy slashes his own arm so that he can claim self-defense. Mark recovers and is returned to a separate cell from Bluey and Jimmy. It is revealed that Mark is serving a 16 1/2-year sentence for the attempted abduction of a judge in order to give Jimmy Loughnan freedom.

Mark meets with the prison board to negotiate a change of prisons for security. The board declines, so Mark has his ears cut off so that he can relocate to a mental health wing where he serves the remainder of his sentence.

When Mark is released from prison, he reunites with his old girlfriend Tanya. While out at a club, Mark flies into a jealous rage and fires several shots with a handgun. Back at Tanya's house, Mark finds her on the phone with Neville Bartos (Vince Colosimo). He physically abuses both Tanya and her mother. Mark goes to Neville's house and learns that Neville supplies most of the "goey" (amphetamine) to the western suburbs of Melbourne and is very wealthy. When Neville refuses to give Mark money, Mark shoots him in the abdomen.

Mark goes to Jimmy Loughnan's apartment that he shares with his pregnant fiancée, Mandy, and their young daughter. Mark reveals that he is working for the police, stating that he has a green light to shoot criminals and that he shot Neville. Mark tells Jimmy that he heard about the bounty on his life and that Jimmy was meant to claim it, and then holds a gun to Jimmy's head. Eventually, Mark apologises and gives money to Jimmy.

In a car park at the Bojangles, Sammy the Turk, another affiliate, states that he wants to show Mark something. Mark produces a sawed-off .410 shotgun and after a brief argument, Mark shoots him in the eye. Mandy witnesses the murder from behind a parked car and tells Jimmy.

Mandy turns crown witness against Mark for the murder of Sammy the Turk. It is revealed that Sammy took Mark out to the car park for Jimmy to cash in on the bounty on Mark, but unknowingly took him to the wrong car park. Mark beats the murder charge but is convicted of maliciously wounding Neville Bartos, and sentenced to 5 years.

== Cast ==
- Eric Bana as Mark "Chopper" Read
- Vince Colosimo as Neville Bartos
- Simon Lyndon as Jimmy Loughnan
- David Field as Keithy George
- Kate Beahan as Tanya
- Dan Wyllie as Bluey
- Fletcher Humphrys as Bucky
- Robert Rabiah as Nick
- Peter Hardy as Detective Cooney
- Brian Mannix as Ian James
- Gary Waddell as Kevin Darcy
- Serge Liistro as Sammy the Turk
- Skye Wansey as Mandy
- Renée Brack as Television Interviewer
- Richard Sutherland as Prison Officer

== Production ==
Read himself suggested that Bana play him, after seeing the actor in the sketch comedy series Full Frontal. Bana spent two days living with Read to help him practice for the role, and many of Read's friends, enemies, and old associates were interviewed. Several of Bana's meetings with Read can be viewed in the DVD special features.

The biggest production difficulty was being allowed to use the Pentridge Prison in Coburg, Victoria, for the shooting. The prison was being closed down and while the negotiations were underway, the funding for production was delayed. This put off the start of the shoot. Some extras were hired from former inmates and tattoo parlours.

To show the sterility of the prison and to contrast it with the world that Chopper encounters after leaving prison 16 years later, the production was split into two. The first part, filmed at the H Division of Pentridge Prison, one of the actual prisons that Chopper frequented, was as plain and sterile as could be and all the scenes in the second part, taking place in 1986, were overly coloured to achieve a paranoid and agoraphobic atmosphere called "visual overload" by the director Andrew Dominik. This was attained by lighting, choice of film stock used, and colours chosen for set decoration. Part one of the production ran from 3 May until 26 May with part two continuing from 28 June until 21 July 2000. The month-long break enabled Bana to put on the extra weight necessary to play the older Read.

== Reception ==
Chopper was received with positive reviews. Review-based rating site Rotten Tomatoes gave the film a 76% "fresh" rating from 80 critics, with its critical consensus stating "Eric Bana's performance as the charming but twisted Chopper is the highlight of this disturbing portrait of Australia's notorious author/criminal." Metacritic, which uses a weighted average, assigned the film a score of 68 out of 100, based on 26 critics, indicating "generally favorable" reviews.

Roger Ebert of the Chicago Sun-Times gave the film 3 stars out of 4, praising Bana for his performance, saying, "He has a quality no acting school can teach and few actors can match." Margaret Pomeranz for SBS gave the film four-and-a-half stars out of five, commenting that what Dominik "achieved is extraordinary." David Stratton, in the same review, remarked "There's no doubting the intelligence of Andrew Dominik's direction" and declared Bana's performance as "astonishing."

Read later praised Bana's performance on the 20 to 1 episode Great Aussie Films, where Chopper came 17th.

=== Box office ===
Chopper was given a wide release in Australia on 3 August 2000 appearing on 132 screens, despite its R (over 18) rating. It grossed A$300,000 in previews before becoming the number one film in Australia, knocking Mel Gibson helmer, The Patriot, from the top spot, with a gross of A$1.8 million in its opening week. It went on to gross A$5,912,119 in Australia It grossed US$0.2 million in the United States and Canada and US$0.3 million in other territories for a worldwide total of A$6.8 million. It was released on 8 September 2000 in Canada, appearing in the Discovery section of the Toronto International Film Festival 2000.

Chopper received a limited re-release in Australian cinemas on 21 August 2025 for its 25th Anniversary. This featured some additional behind the scenes footage.

== Home video ==
In Australia, the film was released on DVD and VHS in 2001 by 20th Century Fox Home Entertainment South Pacific. For the United States, it received a VHS release in 2001 through First Look Pictures. In 2020, a 20th anniversary edition Blu-Ray was released in Australia by Madman Entertainment.

== Awards and nominations ==
| Award | Category | Subject | Result |
|---|---|---|---|
| AACTA Awards (2000 AFI Awards) | Best Film | Michele Bennett | Nominated |
| AACTA Awards (2000 AFI Awards) | Best Direction | Andrew Dominik | Won |
| AACTA Awards (2000 AFI Awards) | Best Adapted Screenplay | Andrew Dominik | Nominated |
| AACTA Awards (2000 AFI Awards) | Best Actor | Eric Bana | Won |
| AACTA Awards (2000 AFI Awards) | Best Supporting Actor | Simon Lyndon | Won |
| AACTA Awards (2000 AFI Awards) | Best Cinematography | Geoffrey Hall | Nominated |
| AACTA Awards (2000 AFI Awards) | Best Cinematography | Kevin Hayward | Nominated |
| AACTA Awards (2000 AFI Awards) | Best Editing | Ken Sallows | Nominated |
| AACTA Awards (2000 AFI Awards) | Best Original Music Score | Mick Harvey | Nominated |
| AACTA Awards (2000 AFI Awards) | Best Production Design | Paddy Reardon | Nominated |
| British Independent Film Awards | Best Foreign Independent Film | Andrew Dominik | Nominated |
| Cognac Police Film Festival | Critics Award | Andrew Dominik | Won |
| Cognac Police Film Festival | Grand Prix Award | Andrew Dominik | Won |
| FCCA Awards | Best Film | Michele Bennett | Won |
| FCCA Awards | Best Director | Andrew Dominik | Won |
| FCCA Awards | Best Screenplay | Andrew Dominik | Nominated |
| FCCA Awards | Best Male Actor | Eric Bana | Won |
| FCCA Awards | Best Male Supporting Actor | Simon Lyndon | Won |
| FCCA Awards | Best Female Supporting Actor | Kate Beahan | Nominated |
| FCCA Awards | Best Cinematography | Geoffrey Hall | Nominated |
| FCCA Awards | Best Cinematography | Kevin Hayward | Nominated |
| FCCA Awards | Best Editing | Ken Sallows | Nominated |
| FCCA Awards | Best Music Score | Mick Harvey | Nominated |
| Inside Film Awards | Best Independent New Filmmaker | Andrew Dominik | Won |
| Inside Film Awards | Best Actor | Eric Bana | Won |
| Stockholm International Film Festival | Bronze Horse Award | Andrew Dominik | Nominated |
| Stockholm International Film Festival | Best Actor | Eric Bana | Won |

== Music ==
- "Don't Fence Me In" – Frankie Laine
- "Black and Blue" – Chain
- "Sweet Love" – Renee Geyer
- "Bad Boy for Love" and "Stuck on You" – Rose Tattoo
- "Forever Now" – Cold Chisel
- "Release the Bats" – The Birthday Party
- "Senile Dementia" – The Saints
- "Ever Lovin' Man" – The Loved Ones

== See also ==
- Cinema of Australia
