= Hammer Bay =

- Hammer Bay film poster
- Written by: Ben Briand; Andrew Liversidge
- Directed by: Ben Briand
- Starring: Jacki Weaver; Guy Edmonds; Penny McNamee; Jessica McNamee; Ben Briand; Nathanial Dean; Sam Smith; Edward Woodley; Andrew Sharp; Amy Mizzi; Rupert Noffs; Anne Looby; Nash Edgerton; David Michôd
- Music by: Basil Hogios
- Country of origin: Australia
- Original language: English

Production
- Producers: Pip Smart; Christopher Sharp
- Cinematography: Hugh Miller; Ben Briand
- Editors: Katie Flaxman; Ben Briand

Original release
- Release: 2007

Hammer Bay is a 2007 Australian TV film written and directed by Ben Briand. The film's unconventional structure is part narrative and part fabricated documentary.

== Plot ==
When a documentary crew arrive one morning asking questions about the recent violent beachside murder of Amanda Blakely, teen beauty and drama pet, a captivating study into the minds and psyche of the sleepy town unfolds. The lines between the observant film crew, interview participants and police begin to blur, as family members, friends and strangers all start to demonstrate one common thread, everyone is hiding something.

== Cast ==
- Jacki Weaver as Aileen Blakely
- Guy Edmonds as Mike Richmond
- Penny McNamee as Alice Blakely
- Ben Briand as Documentary filmmaker
- Jessica McNamee as Amanda Blakely
- Sam Smith as Daniel Horn
- Amy Mizzi as Vanessa 'Pop' Hall
- Nathaniel Dean as Brad Abbot
- Edward Woodley as Jake Richmond
- Andrew Sharp as Warren Clark
- Rupert Noffs as Jesse Blakely
- Anne Looby as Lauren Clarke
- David Michôd as Missing Persons Detective
- Nash Edgerton as Missing Persons Detective

== Production ==
After submitting a largely improvised 3 min test pilot for the inaugural Optus ONE80PROJECT competition, it was awarded the People's Choice Award on 28 January 2007. In a joint venture with MTV Australia, Sony Ericsson and Optus, the festival was the first round of the initiative designed to expose the talent of standout new directors, writers and producers. Judges for the competition that year were Abbie Cornish, Neil Armfield, Alice Bell, Nash Edgerton and Joel Edgerton.

The 52-minute film was produced by Cherub Pictures for Optus and MTV.
