= Geoffrey Hall (cinematographer) =

Australian cinematographer

Geoffrey Hall is an Australian cinematographer, known his work on such films Chopper (2000) and Red Dog (2011). More recently, he worked on Paramount+ series NCIS: Sydney (2024).

== Early life and education ==
Geoffrey Hall grew up in Melbourne, Victoria. He started taking an interest in photography when he was eight, when his father took him to his workplace, a film lab in Malvern.

Hall studied art and design at Prahran College in Melbourne, where he was inspired by his photographic lecturer Athol Shmith as well as filmmaker Paul Cox. He then went on to study film and television at the Swinburne Film and TV School.

== Career ==
Hall started out doing various work as a freelancer in the Melbourne film industry. As a cinematographer, his early career was mostly in music videos and commercials. Among others, he shot award-winning commercials for Honda, Glass Mountain Spritzer, Mitsubishi, and Powerade, and music videos for The Darkness, Kate Ceberano, The Screaming Jets, Peter Andre, and Hunters and Collectors.

His first feature film was The Life of Harry Dare (1995). Other films include Chopper (2000), Red Dog (2011) and its sequel Red Dog: True Blue (2016), Australia Day (2017), and Escape from Pretoria (2020). He has collaborated with director Kriv Stenders on many films.

For the ABC/Netflix spy-thriller series Pine Gap (2018), Hall worked closely with director, Mat King, and production designer Scott Bird, to create the look and feel of the secretive joint Australian-US military facility known as Pine Gap, in the Northern Territory. He had previously worked with Bird on Anzac Girls (2014). Tim Crosby of Rising Sun Pictures provided the backdrop of the facility. Hall also requested Maxx Corkindale as his B-camera operator, as they work well together, and there were challenges of shooting in the location near Alice Springs.

He worked on the Stan Original science fiction series Bloom in 2018, and drama series Eden (2021).

In 2020, Hall was cinematographer for Halifax: Retribution, a reboot of the crime drama series, Halifax f.p. that 20 years earlier (1994-2001) on Channel Nine. Speaking about the shoot, in which a sniper was positioned somewhere in Melbourne city centre, Hall said "With lots of night and low light scenes I chose to shoot full-frame to make the most of the Cooke T2 S7/i lenses enabling him to capture a true, big cinematic look with Bokeh influence".

He has also been cinematographer for the TV series The Tourist, Human Error, North Shore, and The Messenger, among others. In 2024, he worked on the Paramount+ series NCIS: Sydney as well as the legal thriller film The Correspondent, based on the memoir by journalist Peter Greste, who was detained by Egyptian authorities for nearly two years in 2013 until 2015. Hall's work on the film was praised in reviews.

== Recognition and awards ==
Hall became an member of the Australian Cinematographers Society (ACS) in 1993, becoming accredited in 1998.

As of 2024 he has been nominated eight times for AFI/AACTA Awards, winning AACTA Awards for the TV series Wolf Creek and Bloom. He has also been awarded three ACS Gold Tripods, and won the SA and WA Milton Ingerson Best Entry Award on three occasions. He has won at least 13 Gold, 9 Silver, and 8 Bronze ACS Awards.

His awards and nominations include:

AFI Awards for Best Cinematography

- 2002: Nominated, for Dirty Deeds
- 2000: Nominated, for Chopper

IF Awards for Best Cinematography:

- 2000: Chopper
- 2011: Red Dog

ACS Gold Award:

- 2000: The Missing

ACS Silver Award:

- 2004: Thunderstruck

ACS Golden Tripod for Best Cinematography:

- 2000: The Missing
- 2002: The Smell That Killed Him

AACTA Award for Best Cinematography

- 2012: Nominated, for Red Dog
- 2017: Nominated, for the miniseries Wake in Fright
