= Mr Inbetween =

Australian comedy-drama television series

- Season 2 poster
- Genre: Crime drama; Comedy drama; Dark comedy
- Created by: Scott Ryan
- Based on: The Magician by Scott Ryan
- Written by: Scott Ryan
- Directed by: Nash Edgerton
- Starring: Scott Ryan; Justin Rosniak; Brooke Satchwell; Nicholas Cassim; Chika Yasumura; Damon Herriman
- Country of origin: Australia
- Original language: English
- No. of seasons: 3
- No. of episodes: 26

Production
- Executive producers: Scott Ryan; Nash Edgerton; Jason Burrows
- Producer: Michele Bennett
- Camera setup: Single-camera
- Running time: 21–32 minutes
- Production companies: Create NSW; Screen Australia; Blue-Tongue Films; Jungle Entertainment; Pariah Productions (season 3); FXP (seasons 2–3)

Original release
- Network: Fox Showcase (Australia); FX (United States)
- Release: 25 September 2018 – 13 July 2021

Related
- The Magician

Mr Inbetween is an Australian dark comedy-crime drama television series which premiered on FX on 25 September 2018 in the United States, followed by Fox Showcase in Australia on 1 October 2018. The series is a serialisation of the 2005 feature film The Magician, which was created, written by and starred Scott Ryan as Ray Shoesmith, a hitman for hire balancing his criminal and personal lives. Ryan reprises his lead role and is also the writer for the series, while all episodes are directed by Nash Edgerton.

The program was originally commissioned for FX Australia as its first original drama production, but instead launched in Australia on Showcase following the closure of FX Australia between commission and premiere. Filming took place in various locations in Sydney.

On 9 October 2018, FX and Foxtel renewed the series for a second season which premiered on 12 September 2019. On 26 May 2020, the series was renewed for a third and final season which premiered on 25 May 2021. The series concluded on 13 July 2021, after three seasons and 26 episodes. The series received critical acclaim, with praise for its writing, directing, performances, and tone.

== Premise ==
Set within the suburbs of Sydney, Raymond "Ray" Shoesmith (Scott Ryan) is an ex-soldier turned hitman for hire who makes a life out of balancing his criminal activities with his obligations to friends and family. He tries to be a father to Brittany (Chika Yasumura), his daughter with his ex-wife, Jacinta (Natalie Tran), a loving boyfriend to Ally (Brooke Satchwell), and a good caretaker to his terminally ill brother Bruce (Nicholas Cassim). Ray also covers for his friend Gary (Justin Rosniak) when needed, and follows orders from his boss Freddy (Damon Herriman). Ray deals with criminals and monsters in his own violent way; this behaviour, however, starts to take its toll and affects his relationships.

== Cast ==
=== Main ===
- Scott Ryan as Raymond "Ray" Shoesmith, a hitman known as "The Magician"
- Justin Rosniak as Gary Thomas, Ray's best friend
- Brooke Satchwell as Ally, Ray's girlfriend (seasons 1–2; guest season 3)
- Nicholas Cassim as Bruce Shoesmith, Ray's older brother who has motor neurone disease (seasons 1–2)
- Chika Yasumura as Brittany, Ray's daughter
- Damon Herriman as Freddy, Ray's employer who owns a strip club
- Matt Nable as Dave, another hitman who befriends Ray (season 3; recurring seasons 1–2)
- Jeremy Sims as Rafael, a criminal kingpin (season 3)

=== Recurring ===
- Natalie Tran as Jacinta, Ray's ex-wife and Brittany's mother
- Lizzie Schebesta as Tatiana, Gary's Russian wife
- David Michôd as Peter, a therapist (seasons 1–2)
- Kenny Graham as Bill Shoesmith, Ray's father (seasons 2–3)
- Rose Riley as Michele, Freddy's girlfriend (seasons 2–3)

==== Season 1 ====
- Jackson Tozer as Vasilli, Tatiana's brother
- Firass Dirani as Davros, the brother of Freddy's son-in-law who runs afoul of Ray
- Edmund Lembke-Hogan as Nick

==== Season 2 ====
- Josh McConville as Alex, the vice president of Vinnie Williams's biker gang
- Eddie Baroo as Kevin, Alex's lieutenant
- Kieran Darcy-Smith as Vinnie Williams, the jovial president of a biker gang and an old acquaintance of Ray's
- Ben Oxenbould as Dirk, a colleague of Ray's
- Mercia Deane-Johns as Steph, a shopkeeper
- Mirrah Foulkes as Kate Hall, a journalist and family friend of Freddy's who interviews Ray

==== Season 3 ====
- Sam Cotton as Adam Kelsey, Ray's timid cellmate during his brief incarceration
- Bryn Chapman Parish as James, a young member of Rafael's gang
- Jackson Heywood as Matty
- Tessa de Josselin as Karen
- Brad McMurray as Cullen
- Emily Barclay as Zoe

=== Guests ===
==== Season 1 ====
- Josh Quong Tart as Luke Henson, one of Ray's targets
- Benedict Hardie as Lefty, a car thief
- Rahel Romahn as Hassam
- Sam Delich as Yaniv

==== Season 2 ====
- Daniel Amalm as Sam, a rude patron at an amusement park
- Fayssal Bazzi as Nassir, Davros's brother
- Hugo Johnstone-Burt as Jason
- Nash Edgerton as Trent, Ally's pompous brother
- Clayton Jacobson as Benny, a friend of Gary's
- Simon Lyndon as Pidgy, a criminal contact Gary enlists to help find a missing child
- Tiriel Mora as Kim, a grieving father who enlists Ray to help find the remains of his long-missing daughter

==== Season 3 ====
- Ian Roberts as Graham, a small-time arms dealer
- Brian Rooney as Dan
- Jacek Koman as Remy, a crime boss
- Justine Clarke as Meaghan Clarke, a former classmate of Gary's who he had a crush on
- Daniel Henshall as Kenny, a former classmate of Gary's who used to bully him
- Julia Savage as Phoebe, one of Britt's friends
- Ned Manning as Reg
- Thom Green as Jason

== Episodes ==
Series	Episodes	Originally released	
Series	Episodes	First released	Last released
1	6	25 September 2018	9 October 2018
2	11	12 September 2019	21 November 2019
3	9	25 May 2021	13 July 2021

=== Season 1 (2018) ===
No. overall	No. in season	Title	Directed by	Written by	Original release date	U.S. viewers
1	1	"The Pee Pee Guy"	Nash Edgerton	Scott Ryan	25 September 2018	645,000
Short-tempered contract killer Raymond "Ray" Shoesmith is asked for help by his best friend Gary. Gary's wife Tatiana finds his urine-related pornography stash. Gary then pretends the pornography belongs to Ray. Ray allows Tatiana to berate him. While out with his daughter Brittany, two young men intentionally knock into her, causing her ice cream to fall to the ground. They also curse in front of her. Ray has her wait in his car then confronts the young men. When his daughter cannot see him, Ray beats one of them—the other runs away. Walking back, he encounters Ally, a woman he met earlier while playing with his dog, and the two exchange numbers. Title origin: Gary's brother-in-law Vasilli, believing Gary's pornography to be Ray's, refers to him as "the pee pee guy".
2	2	"Unicorns Know Everybody's Name"	Nash Edgerton	Scott Ryan	25 September 2018	515,000
Ray kidnaps and kills a man on orders from his crime boss, Freddy, who runs a strip club. Later Ray learns that Freddy assigned Ray the wrong target for the hit. Complying with the target's wishes for his family to know what happened to him, Ray anonymously informs the man's wife and gives her money. Gary is beaten into a coma during an arms deal done alongside his brother-in-law Vasilli. Ray attacks Vasilli after realising Vasilli's story is partly fabricated. After some interrogation, Ray learns that the deal was an orchestrated plot to rob Gary. Ray tracks down and brutally beats the men who hurt his friend. Title origin: While telling Brittany a story about a time a unicorn addressed him directly, Ray claims that "unicorns know everybody's name".
3	3	"Captain Obvious"	Nash Edgerton	Scott Ryan	2 October 2018	551,000
Ray attends a court-ordered anger management therapy session following his beating of one of the young men who caused Brittany's ice cream to fall to the ground and cursed in front of her. He is almost ejected from the therapy session after baiting another attendee into a fight. While recovering home alone from his injuries, Gary is robbed by Vasilli, but Ray saves him after Gary texts Ray asking for help. Gary shoots Vasilli in the forehead just as Tatiana comes home. He distracts her while Ray starts to cut up Vasilli's body for disposal. Vasilli, however, is not dead, and wakes up while Ray begins to cut him. Vasilli's arm is almost cut off. After Gary explains to Tatiana what Vasilli tried to do to him, Tatiana chases Vasilli out of the house. Title origin: Gary sarcastically says "thanks, Captain Obvious" to Ray when he points out that Vasilli was not dead.
4	4	"On Behalf of Society"	Nash Edgerton	Scott Ryan	2 October 2018	426,000
Freddie sets Ray up in a meeting with Davros, Freddy's relative who is also a crime boss. Ray had beaten up Davros's men after they beat up Gary. Ray refuses to shake Davros's hand, disrespecting Davros. Despite Freddy's warnings to leave Ray alone, Davros nevertheless sends three men after Ray. Now dating Ally, Ray has a violent incident in a parking lot that she witnesses, which unsettles her. At a therapy session, Ray reveals his philosophy of violence regarding people he views as detriments to society ("dickheads"). That night, Ray notices Davros's men watching his house and lures them to a remote area, where he kills them with a Patchett submachine gun, a gift from Gary. He returns home to Ally, who can smell the gunpowder on him but cannot identify it. Title origin: When Ray claims he beats up people he feels are detrimental to the public, his group leader sarcastically thanks him "on behalf of society".
5	5	"Hard Worker"	Nash Edgerton	Scott Ryan	9 October 2018	408,000
Ray and Gary discover that one of their associates is an undercover cop, but Ray decides to drive the cop out into the wilderness and let him go rather than kill him. Ray is later kidnapped by Dave and Bobby, two hitmen Davros hired to capture and deliver Ray to the crime boss. While in the car, Dave and Ray argue about the name Dave chose for the son his wife will soon deliver. Ray stalls for time by revealing that he has a hidden strongbox holding more money than they are getting for doing the job. The hitmen privately plan to take the money and deliver Ray to Davros anyway. Ray leads them to the strongbox but claims not to remember the combination. As Dave goes into a hardware store to buy a gas-powered cutting torch, Bobby leaves Ray in the trunk of their car to go buy cigarettes. When they return, the car is gone. Title origin: When Dave asks Ray how he makes so much money, Ray smugly tells him "I'm a hard worker".
6	6	"Your Mum's Got a Strongbox"	Nash Edgerton	Scott Ryan	9 October 2018	319,000
The viewer learns that the car is gone because two petty criminals steal Dave and Bobby's car. Unbeknown to the car thieves Ray is still in the trunk. The car thieves drive to a garage, where they sell the car to a crooked mechanic. The mechanic opens the trunk and, discovering Ray inside, immediately closes it, drives the car to a wooded area, gets out, and walks back to the garage. He harangues the two thieves for not disclosing that there was a man inside the trunk. Ray escapes from the trunk and walks into the garage. He comes across the car thieves with his strongbox. He takes the box back by force. Dave and Bobby drive to the garage looking for a car, only to find Ray. They kidnap him once more. They drive him out into the woods to meet Davros. Bobby stupidly mentions the strongbox to Davros, who demands the hitmen split Ray's money with him. They make Ray dig a large hole in which they plan to bury him. Bobby uses the torch to cut open the strongbox, which is rigged with explosives. It explodes upon opening, but does not harm Ray, who is protected by the mound of dirt beside the hole he was digging. Ray grabs a gun from one of the men wounded by the explosion. He kills Bobby, Davros, and the latter's associate. He then confronts Dave who receives a phone call; his mother-in-law tells him that his pregnant wife has gone into labour. Ray decides to let Dave leave and buries the three bodies. While Ray is burying the three dead, he gets a call from Ally. He tells her that he will be late for a date because of work obligations. Title origin: While walking away from the auto shop with Ray's strongbox, one of the criminals jokes to the other that "your mum's got a strongbox".

=== Season 2 (2019) ===
No. overall	No. in season	Title	Directed by	Written by	Original release date	U.S. viewers
7	1	"Shoulda Tapped"	Nash Edgerton	Scott Ryan	12 September 2019	506,000
After Freddy hires two junkies to perform a hit, they bungle the disposal of the corpse. He sends Ray to kill them and get rid of all three bodies. Driving out into the bush, Ray finds himself connecting with one over a mutual interest in music. The other junkie starts to smoke ice. Ray tells him to put out the pipe, provoking the junkie into pointing a gun at Ray. Ray crashes the car, killing both junkies, then sets the car on fire. Title origin: After Ray is wrestled into submission and nearly choked out at his gym by teenage Samantha, his friend tells him that he "shoulda tapped".
8	2	"Don't Be a Dickhead"	Nash Edgerton	Scott Ryan	19 September 2019	539,000
Ray visits the mother of Brittany's classmate after learning that the girl has been cyberbullying Brittany. The mother, however, is adamant that her daughter is innocent and sends the police to his house after feeling she was being threatened. Understanding that he cannot approach the girl himself, Ray sends Samantha, the girl who bested him at the gym, to threaten the bully on his behalf. Ray is hired by Alex, the vice president of a motorcycle club, to kill the president, an old acquaintance named Vinnie. Later, he opens up to Ally about how he was bullied as a boy and beaten at home, and that he considered suicide but ultimately decided against it. Title origin: Ray casually challenges the mother to call the police on him, and she retorts with "don't be a dickhead".
9	3	"I Came from Your Balls?"	Nash Edgerton	Scott Ryan	26 September 2019	383,000
While out with Brittany and Ally at a carnival, Ray almost gets into a violent altercation, but Ally stops him. Brittany later walks in on Ally and Ray having sex, forcing them to awkwardly (and comically) explain the concept to her. Ray's MND-stricken brother Bruce moves into Ray's garage. Ray goes to collect a debt from a man whose mother happens to be home. Ray is forced to wait until she leaves, and soon learns that the man has the money, but was saving it to move to Los Angeles for acting classes; Ray smashes a much-loved ukulele in the man's face for the inconvenience. Title origin: Brittany asks "I came from your balls?" when Ray explains how babies are made.
10	4	"Monsters"	Nash Edgerton	Scott Ryan	3 October 2019	332,000
Ray is hired by an elderly man dying of cancer to find the body of his teenage daughter, who has been missing for twenty-four years. The bereft father points Ray in the direction of Dennis Miller, a convicted paedophile who was the prime suspect in her disappearance but the police did not have sufficient evidence to convict. Ray enters Miller's house and tortures Miller until he admits to murdering the girl and stashing her body in a train tunnel. Ray has Miller lead Ray to the body. Ray calls the victim's father, allowing him to see it and take a locket from her hair. Miller feebly tries to apologise to the father as Ray leaves them alone. After the father leaves, Ray returns to the tunnel, implying he will kill Miller. Title origin: When Brittany asks to sleep in Ray's bed, she claims she is being terrorized by "monsters" under hers.
11	5	"Can't Save You"	Nash Edgerton	Scott Ryan	10 October 2019	394,000
Ray reluctantly promises Brittany that he will give up smoking. At a Christmas party with Ally's family, there is a game of Secret Santa. Brit gets a candle shaped like a unicorn, her favourite "animal". In the involuntary swapping part of the game, Ally's brother Trent takes the unicorn and gives Brit his Secret Santa prize. Just outside on the porch, Ray tries to persuade Trent to give Britt back the unicorn, explaining how much she loves unicorns. After Trent repeatedly and rudely refuses, Ray throws him through a glass door, shocking the other guests. When Ray later tries to blame the event on his inability to stop smoking and de-stress, Ally tells him that she left her similarly violent fiancé of three years after he started physically abusing her. Ally says she loves Ray but cannot take the same risk again, and decides to leave him. Title origin: In a cut line shown in the season 2 trailer, Ally tells Ray "but I can't save you, I can only save myself" during their breakup.
12	6	"Let Me Stop You There"	Nash Edgerton	Scott Ryan	17 October 2019	360,000
Ray collects Ally's things from his house and throws them out. He spends time with his dog in the park where he and Ally first met, but ends up getting into an argument with a woman who refuses to pick up her dog's excrement. Ray gets a job to strong-arm a woman who is supposedly blackmailing his hirer. Ray learns that she had an extramarital affair with the man that left her pregnant, and that she wanted the money (which was much less than the hirer claimed) to support herself and the child. Ray makes the man pay the more modest amount the woman wanted. Ray and Ally see each other at a supermarket but she leaves in a hurry, provoking him to drive to a park where she etched a heart into a tree for him and destroy it with an axe. Title origin: While the man who hired him tries to get out of paying the reduced blackmail price, Ray interrupts with "let me stop you there, mate, okay?"
13	7	"Watch Out for Snakes"	Nash Edgerton	Scott Ryan	24 October 2019	415,000
Ray takes Bruce to visit their estranged father Bill, but refuses to see his father and only comes in to help Bruce up and into the car. Alex, the vice president of a motorcycle club, hires Ray to kill the club president, an old acquaintance named Vinnie. Ray tracks Vinnie to the latter's family farm and plans to assassinate him there, bringing Gary along as his getaway driver. Ray dons camouflage and creeps towards the farm with a sniper rifle, but is caught on a security camera by Dave, now Vinnie's bodyguard, the camouflage concealing his identity. Ray takes shots at Vinnie and misses, fleeing with Gary. Later, he reads Jack and the Beanstalk to Brittany before bed, and adds on an ending where Jack is arrested for theft and murder after she expresses displeasure with Jack being the story's hero. Title origin: As Ray leaves to go kill Vinnie, Gary calls after him to "watch out for snakes!"
14	8	"See You In Your Dreams"	Nash Edgerton	Scott Ryan	31 October 2019	344,000
Freddy asks Ray to do him a favour and speak to a friend's daughter, a journalist writing a book on the criminal mentality. He talks to her and reveals his complete indifference to the evil nature of his work. Ray and Gary kidnap Vinnie, who admits to Ray that he sees the people he has killed in his dreams; Ray admits to Vinnie that Alex hired him for the hit, and Vinnie accepts his fate. Before Ray kills him, Vinnie says Ray will see him in his dreams. Freddy fires Dirk, a bouncer and a military friend of Ray's; Dirk robs Freddy in retaliation. Freddy orders Ray to kill Dirk; instead, Ray tries to convince Dirk to leave town. Dirk states that he is haunted by his experiences in the military, including one where he killed a child, and chooses to commit suicide, devastating Ray. Title origin: Vinnie tells Ray that he will "see you in your dreams" just before he is killed.
15	9	"Socks Are Important"	Nash Edgerton	Scott Ryan	7 November 2019	432,000
Dirk's daughter Maddy gets kidnapped while Ray and Brittany are out with her at a store. Ray attacks a sex offender misidentified as the perpetrator, as well as Davros's brother, who had threatened Ray earlier, though both are innocent; the latter incident causes a major scene at the home of Davros's family, forcing Freddy to apologise. Meanwhile, Gary tracks down a man who had bought cannabis from the potential kidnapper. Gary and the buyer figure out that the drug dealer is a child trafficker. They get the dealer's location; Gary attacks him and his two accomplices in their home, discovering Maddy being held in a secret room. Gary frees Maddy then locks the kidnappers inside the secret room. He returns Maddy to her mother, and sends Ray the traffickers' address. Ray goes to the traffickers' house and kills them with a shovel. Title origin: When Brittany proclaims socks "boring" while shopping, Ray insists that "socks are important".
16	10	"Nice Face"	Nash Edgerton	Scott Ryan	14 November 2019	409,000
Freddy fires Ray after the incident with Davros's brother. Britt meets Bill in Bruce's garage, thereby learning she has a grandfather. Ray comes out and tells her to go in the house. While out target shooting with his dog, two bikers sent by Alex attack Ray, who kills them, but sustains an injury to his eye. Ray's dog is killed in the crossfire. Dave helps Ray in kidnapping Alex, to pay Ray back for sparing him. Alex convinces them that he has a large sum of money hidden away and negotiates his life for it; Ray and Dave drive off to go get it. Title origin: After Ray has his eye injured and the biker he is fighting has his nose bitten into, he snarks "nice eye" and Ray retorts with "nice face".
17	11	"There Rust, and Let Me Die"	Nash Edgerton	Scott Ryan	21 November 2019	383,000
While Ray and Dave dig up Alex's money, Alex flees into the woods. Despite the best efforts of Ray, Dave and Gary, whom Ray brought along as backup, they fail to recapture Alex. The three finish digging up the money and keep it. Ray and Brittany bury his dog. Bruce, now needing a wheelchair and not wanting to live with his disease any longer, indulges Brittany's obsession with being an actress by reenacting a scene from Romeo and Juliet with her. He and Ray drive to their run-down childhood home, where he begs his brother to forgive their father for his abuse. At Bruce's request, Ray euthanizes Bruce with medication. Ray burns the house down with Bruce's body inside. Title origin: "There rust, and let me die" is Juliet's last line in Romeo and Juliet before she commits suicide, and is repeated by Brittany while reenacting the play with Bruce.

=== Season 3 (2021) ===
No. overall	No. in season	Title	Directed by	Written by	Original release date	U.S. viewers
18	1	"Coulda Shoulda"	Nash Edgerton	Scott Ryan	25 May 2021	440,000
Four men conspire to pretend to consummate an arms deal with Ray and Gary and rob them. One of the conspirators pretends to be a wounded arms buyer to make the robbery look authentic. Ray easily sees through the ruse after the faker's friends steal the guns. Ray makes the faker call the accomplices and arrange a meeting to enable Ray and Gary to get the guns back. When Ray asks for the money too, he is refused. Ray, Gary and Dave attack the men, killing them all. As the leader dies from his injuries, he laments leading his friends to their deaths. Troubled, Ray chooses not to take a share of the money. Ray gets arrested and jailed after attacking a man over a traffic dispute, and befriends his cellmate Adam. Ray calls Brittany and asserts that everything is fine, not telling her where he is. Title origin: As the leader of the robbers dies, he remarks to Ray that he "should've given you the fucking cash", and Ray muses "coulda, shoulda".
19	2	"Champ"	Nash Edgerton	Scott Ryan	25 May 2021	290,000
Freddy visits Ray in prison, hiring him to do a job for crime boss Rafael by punishing but not killing another prisoner. Ray attacks the prisoner by throwing boiling water containing jam on the prisoner's face, causing his skin to melt off. Cellmate Adam teaches Ray to meditate and they have a debate over whether or not violence is the proper way to settle conflicts. When Ray introduces Adam to an insider, Adam not knowing prison argot but in a friendly manner greets the insider as "Champ". Ray explains that in prison argot "champ" means cocksucker and Adam should be prepared for revenge. Adam is eventually brutally attacked by the inmate. Dave tracks down the man who got Ray imprisoned and threatens him into dropping the charges. As soon as he gets out, Ray goes to see Brittany. He learns from the mother of one of Brittany's friends that the mother knows that he was in prison. He tries to convince both Brittany and the mother that the incident was not his fault, but he fails with both of them. Title origin: Adam refers to a violent prisoner as "champ", unaware he is actually calling him a "cocksucker".
20	3	"All I Ever Wanted"	Nash Edgerton	Scott Ryan	1 June 2021	300,000
Freddy introduces Ray to Rafael on the latter's boat; Ray refuses to join Rafael's organisation, asserting his preference to freelance. Gary, still hung up on his now ex-wife, spies on her and her new girlfriend but gets stuck on their balcony. He calls Ray to come to help him, but Tatiana catches him climbing down from the balcony, causing him to fall. Ray invites Gary to come and live with him. He encounters a pregnant Ally while out, and the two have a peaceful, tender encounter before parting ways. The deteriorating Bill is detained after starting a fire in his apartment, and Ray reluctantly lets him move in, despite him believing Ray is Bruce. Later that night, Bill wanders off, and Ray is forced to track him down and bring him back home. Title origin: As Ray and Ally part ways, he remarks that "I'm glad you're happy, darling. It's all I ever wanted".
21	4	"Cut the Crap Princess"	Nash Edgerton	Scott Ryan	8 June 2021	273,000
Brittany finds Ray's pistol and messes around with it, accidentally shooting a hole through her wall just as he comes home. She tries to hide it, but he notes her strange behaviour and the smell of gunpowder and realises what she has done, forcing him to tighten the gun's security. Gary asks Ray to go back to his old house and get something from his porn closet, and he has a hostile encounter with Tatiana and her girlfriend while there. The item turns out to be a sex toy shaped like a foot, which Ray does not understand the appeal of. Rafael hires Ray to do another job, disposing of an overdosed woman's body by feeding it to a drift of pigs, but he instead decides to bury it in the nearby woods. Title origin: When Brittany denies firing the gun, Ray tells her to "cut the crap, princess".
22	5	"Before I Went to War"	Nash Edgerton	Scott Ryan	15 June 2021	321,000
Mistrustful of Brittany's new boyfriend Adrian, Ray has Gary come with him to a beach they are on and spy on them, only for Brittany to notice him. Gary starts a home pornography business, but only attracts the attention of a male same-sex couple. The owner of Ray's frequented gym commits suicide after being scammed and losing his savings. Ray stops his son from hiring a hitman and offers to kill the scammer for free, which he does by hanging him from his ceiling after taking all his money. Bill is moved into an assisted living facility, where he apologises to Ray for his abusive childhood, lamenting how going to war changed him and wishing Ray could have known him as a better father before he changed. Title origin: Bill tells Ray that he wishes "you had've known me before I went to war".
23	6	"Ray Who?"	Nash Edgerton	Scott Ryan	22 June 2021	418,000
Ray and Gary go to their high school reunion, where nobody seems to remember Ray. When Gary is continually made fun of by an old bully, Ray starts a brawl that gets them both thrown out. Adrian gives Brittany MDMA, and Ray attacks him, getting the location of the dealer and warning him never to talk to Brittany again. Ray catches the dealer receiving oral sex from an underaged girl, breaking in and waiting for her to leave before starting towards him, leaving his fate unknown. Ray and Brittany argue once she comes down from her high, but ultimately have a discussion where he admits he wants to shelter her from the evil he sees in the world, but acknowledges he cannot protect her forever and asks that she talk to him if she feels she needs to, which she agrees to. Title origin: When Ray introduces himself to the man he ends up fighting, he asks "Ray who?"
24	7	"I'm Your Girl"	Nash Edgerton	Scott Ryan	29 June 2021	336,000
Freddy's girlfriend approaches Ray for help after she notices Freddy having facial injuries, aware of his gambling addiction and debt. Ray approaches the crime boss to whom Freddy owes money. The boss's burly bodyguard points a finger at Ray admonishing Ray to go no further. Ray, however, almost breaks the guard's finger off. Ray promises the crime boss free use of his services in exchange for giving Freddy more time to repay his debt. On leaving the crime boss's house, the boss identifies Ray as "the Magician" to the bodyguard. (Note: A reference to The Magician, the 2005 film introducing Ray Shoesmith that Scott Ryan directed, wrote, and starred in.) Rafael has Ray accompany him on a drug deal but in separate cars. Ray, who will transport the drugs, is forced to ride with Zoe, a university student, as a man and woman travelling together would appear less suspicious to police officers patrolling the highways. The two find themselves getting along over the next couple of days, and, after a conversation about their past relationships, end up having sex. Title origin: Going to university for graphic design, Zoe tells Ray that "I'm your girl" should he ever need a job done.
25	8	"I'll See You Soon"	Nash Edgerton	Scott Ryan	6 July 2021	331,000
Ray and Zoe take Polaroids of each other with her camera over breakfast. While driving fast through the desert, they hit a passing kangaroo, causing a crash that leaves Zoe severely injured. An elderly couple driving an RV pulls over to help them after Ray calls Rafael. Rafael arrives and immediately kills the couple, disturbing Ray who tells Rafael that the killing was unnecessary. Ray insists that Rafael take Zoe to the hospital, while Ray drives the couple's RV out into the desert, buries their bodies, and spends the next day hiking back to civilisation. He steals a car and drives it to the drop-off point, where Rafael informs him Zoe died en route to the hospital. Ray blames Rafael for mishandling the situation and leaves, passing by the crashed car on the way. He gets out of his car, wipes off fingerprints, and stares at the sunset. Deeply distressed by the loss of the potential for a relationship with Zoe, he begins to cry. Title origin: Ray promises Zoe that "I'll see you soon, darling" as he helps her into Rafael's car.
26	9	"I'm Not Leaving"	Nash Edgerton	Scott Ryan	13 July 2021	294,000
Ray decides to sell his house. He takes Brittany to visit Bill, with whom Ray now seems at peace. Bill, however, does not recognise his son. As Ray sets up his trailer out in the wilderness, Gary says that his pornography business has taken off. Freddy advises Ray to look for Alex, whom he says has resurfaced and is looking for Ray. Freddy gives Ray a location. Ray takes Dave with him, only to be ambushed by Rafael and two of his men. There is a shootout. Rafael and his men wound Dave, who soon dies of his injuries after begging Ray to take care of his young son. Ray kills Rafael's men. Then he chases down and kills a fleeing Rafael. Realising Freddy betrayed him, Ray, who surreptitiously enters Freddy's house, confronts Freddy in his home. Freddy insists Rafael would have killed him if he did not give Ray up. Ray, to Freddy's surprise, leaves Freddy untouched. Some time later, Ray has gained weight, grown his hair out, and started working as a taxi driver. He keeps in his car's sun visor the polaroid he took of Zoe. He picks up two young men whose destination is a remote area. Ray realises that they are planning to attack him. When one of them remarks that "someone might die out here tonight", Ray stops the car and grins knowingly at the passengers, then at the camera. Title origin: Brittany asks Ray why is he moving away, and he insists that "I'm not leaving".

== Reception ==
=== Critical response ===
Mr Inbetween received critical acclaim for its writing and performances. On Rotten Tomatoes, the first season has an approval rating of 90% based on 20 reviews and an average rating of 7/10. The site's critical consensus reads, "Mr Inbetween's familiar setup is quickly forgiven thanks to its expertly built tension and a mesmerizing performance from Scott Ryan". On Metacritic, the first season has a score of 75 out of 100 based on 11 critics, indicating "generally favorable reviews".

The Hollywood Reporter called it "One of 2018's best shows... Creator-writer-actor Scott Ryan and director Nash Edgerton deliver a tour de force that gets a lot done in very little time". Entertainment Weekly named it one of Fall 2018's Must-Watch TV, praising the show's dark comedic tone: "Ryan radiates a casual toughness, like he's cheerfully counting your most breakable bones. Mr. Inbetween gets wilder as it goes along, until the season finale becomes a fully surreal, Fargo-ish tale of a hit gone way wrong". The Globe and Mail called it "a little masterpiece of quiet, compulsively watchable comedy/drama. There are no big ideas here, but the strength of its small-scale narrative is breathtaking".

The New York Times included it on their "Best of Fall 2018 TV" list, stating "The balance between dread and deadpan laughs is adroitly maintained, and there's an appealing casual improvisatory vibe". The Boston Globe said of the show's first season, "The killer with a heart of gold isn't a new trope, of course; viewers have repeatedly been put in the position of moral compromise in the past two decades, most recently with HBO's Barry. But Mr. Inbetween gives it a fresh and funny going over".

In 2019, Season 2 premiered to additional positive reviews. Alan Sepinwall of Rolling Stone praised it, stating "The huge improvement from an already solid first season to this tremendous second one has me wondering if Mr. Inbetween has another big leap in it — or if spending even more time in Ray Shoesmith's world might force Ryan, and us, to start empathizing too much with this very dangerous man". Ben Travers from IndieWire said, "Pair these deeper thoughts with sharp dialogue, an ideally grubby aesthetic, and strong supporting characters, and Mr. Inbetween ends up a rewarding experience worth much more exploration". Screen Rant gave it a positive review, saying "Season 2 elevates the series on nearly every level, from Ryan's writing and acting to the performances of the supporting cast and the directing of Nash Edgerton". The Hollywood Reporter called the "exceptional" second season "a brilliantly taut drama — which jams more into its 23 to 25 minute episodes than most hourlong American dramas — with a lingering emotional after-effect".

The third and final season, which premiered in 2021, received critical praise as well. The New York Times ranked it on their list of "Best TV Shows of 2021" calling it "a smart, deadpan, quietly daft deconstruction of tough-guy clichés". Critic Mike Hale of The New York Times praised it as "a small marvel of sustained tone. The slightest overstatement or sentimentality could capsize the delicate sendup of tough-guy clichés, but Ryan (who writes all the episodes and plays the protagonist, Ray Shoesmith) rarely makes a wrong step".

=== Awards and nominations ===
Mr Inbetween has been nominated and won the following awards:

Screen Producers Australia Awards

Year	Category	Nominee	Result
2022	Drama Series Production of the Year	Michele Bennett, Nash Edgerton	Nominated
2018	Drama Series Production of the Year	Michele Bennett, Nash Edgerton, Scott Ryan, Jason Burrows	Won

Logie Awards

Year	Category	Nominee	Result
2022	Most Outstanding Actor	Scott Ryan	Nominated
2022	Most Outstanding Supporting Actor	Matt Nable	Nominated
2019	Most Outstanding Actor	Scott Ryan	Won

Australian Academy of Cinema and Television Arts (AACTA) Awards

Year	Category	Nominee	Result
2021	Best Lead Actor in a Television Drama	Scott Ryan	Won
2021	Best Screenplay in Television	Scott Ryan for "Ray Who?"	Won
2021	Best Guest or Supporting Actor in a Television Drama	Matt Nable	Nominated
2021	Best Guest or Supporting Actor in a Television Drama	Justin Rosniak	Nominated
2021	Best Drama Series	Michele Bennett, Nash Edgerton, Blue-Tongue Films, Pariah Productions	Nominated
2021	Best Direction in a Television Drama or Comedy	Nash Edgerton for "Ray Who?"	Nominated
2019	Best Lead Actor in a Television Drama	Scott Ryan	Won
2019	Best Guest or Supporting Actor in a Television Drama	Damon Herriman	Nominated
2019	Best Guest or Supporting Actress in a Television Drama	Brooke Satchwell	Nominated
2019	Best Drama Series	Michele Bennett, Nash Edgerton, Blue-Tongue Films	Nominated
2018	Best New Talent	Scott Ryan	Won
2018	Best Lead Actor in a Television Drama	Scott Ryan	Nominated
2018	Best New Talent	Chika Yasumura	Nominated
2018	Best Television Drama Series	Michele Bennett	Nominated
2018	Best Direction in a Television Drama or Comedy	Nash Edgerton for "Unicorns Know Everybody's Name"	Nominated
2018	Best Screenplay in Television	Scott Ryan for "Unicorns Know Everybody's Name"	Nominated

Australian Directors' Guild Awards

Year	Category	Nominee	Result
2021	Best Direction in a TV or SVOD Drama Series	Nash Edgerton for "Ray Who?"	Nominated
2020	Best Direction in a TV or SVOD Drama Series	Nash Edgerton for "Monsters"	Nominated
2019	Best Direction in a TV or SVOD Drama Series	Nash Edgerton for "On Behalf of Society"	Nominated

Australian Screen Sound Guild

Year	Category	Result
2021	Best Sound for a Drama or Comedy (over 30 Minutes)	Won

Casting Guild of Australia Awards

Year	Category	Nominee	Result
2019	Best Casting in a TV Comedy	Kirsty McGregor	Won
2018	Best Casting in a TV Comedy	Kirsty McGregor	Nominated

The Equity Ensemble Awards

Year	Category	Nominee	Result
2019	Outstanding Performance by an Ensemble Series in a Drama Series	Scott Ryan, Damon Herriman, Justin Rosniak, Brooke Satchwell, Nicholas Cassim, Chika Yasumura, Natalie Tran	Nominated

Australian Writers' Guild Awards

Year	Category	Nominee	Result
2018	Comedy – Situation or Narrative	Scott Ryan	Nominated
