= Ben Briand =

Australian film director

Benjamin Briand is an Australian film director.

== Career ==
In 2007 Briand wrote and directed Hammer Bay. The TV film project featured actress Jackie Weaver and was the result of winning the People's Choice Award at the inaugural Optus ONE80PROJECT. The award was a joint venture with Sony Ericsson, Optus and MTV Australia.

In 2014 he directed the coming-of-age noir short film Blood Pulls A Gun which had its World Premiere at South by South West (SXSW) in competition for the Grand Jury Award with the Huffington Post calling it "seriously brilliant". The music, co-composed and performed by Preatures guitarist Jack Moffitt and composer Basil Hogios, was nominated for an APRA AMCOS Screen Music Award, in the category "Best Music for a Short Film" in the category of Best Music For A Short Film for his work.

In 2016 Briand directed the short film The Journey, telling the life story of Brazilian ballet dancer Ingrid Silva in first-person. The film won a Cannes Silver Lion and the Grand Prix at Cristal Festival Europe.

In November 2016 The Hollywood Reporter announced that Briand would direct the feature film 'Fever Heart' starring Alexander Skarsgård and Cara Delevingne. The project was described as a 'gothic thriller'.

Briand was commissioned to write and direct ‘Armour’ starring Natasha Liu Bordizzo for Vogue China to launch their Vogue Film magazine in 2018. The project was created in conjunction with The Woolmark Company.

In 2019 he was invited to direct the first commercial for Apple to be made in Australia. The project titled 'First Dance' celebrates same sex marriage equality becoming law in Australia and featured real couples at their actual weddings. It was named Best TV Campaign of the year at the Australian B&T Awards and was nominated for the Film Lion in Cannes. The campaign drew criticism from conservative Hollywood actor James Woods and his social media followers.

His other commercials include Qantas, ASUS featuring Gal Gadot, Asahi Beer, Audi, Oroton with Rose Byrne, Nespresso and Playboy Fragrances for Coty.

== Filmography ==
- Solemates (2024)
- Armour (2019)
- Ingrid Silva the Journey (2016)
- Blood Pulls a Gun (2014)
- The Gentleman Shaver (2011)
- The Reformed Troglodyte (2011)
- Some Static Started (2010)
- Apricot (2009)
- Castor & Pollux (2009)
- Parting Moments: Following Minutes of a Separation (2008)
- Hammer Bay (TV movie, 2007)
