= Scott Ryan (actor) =

Australian actor, writer, and director (born 1973)

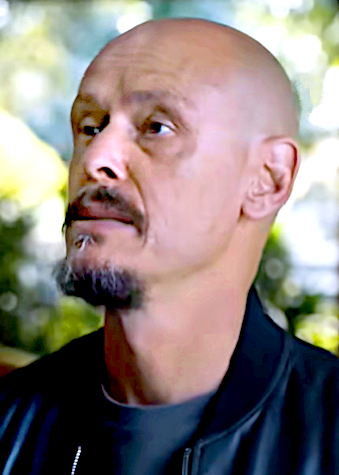
- Ryan in Mr Inbetween, 2021
- Born: 12 May 1973 (age 53); Hallam, Victoria, Australia
- Occupations: Actor; writer; director
- Years active: 2003–present
- Agent: CAA
- Notable work: The Magician; Mr Inbetween
- Awards: AACTA Award for Best Lead Actor in a Television Drama; Logie Award for Most Outstanding Actor

Scott Ryan (born 12 May 1973) is an Australian actor, writer, and director. He wrote and starred in the FX series Mr Inbetween (2018–2021) and the film The Magician (2005), which he also directed.

== Early life and writing beginnings ==
Ryan grew up in Hallam, Victoria and moved to Richmond at age 17. His passion for storytelling began in primary school, where his writing talent was first noticed when his teacher asked him to read his story aloud to the class. This experience inspired him to write and perform plays, but after a failed improvisation attempt, he stopped writing until his twenties.

Ryan faced challenges in high school, being asked to leave both alma maters. He later described his behaviour as possibly related to oppositional defiant disorder, recounting experiences of public humiliation by teachers. At 17, Ryan's mental health declined, leading to agoraphobia. He lived reclusively, leaving his home only for essential tasks. Ryan later encountered Richard Liu, a master of medicine and martial arts, who introduced him to Chinese herbs and meditation. For 12 years, Ryan led a monk-like lifestyle, practising yoga, tai chi, and meditation, and abstaining from indulgences. This period of reflection reignited his passion for writing.

== Career ==
Ryan self-funded the production of The Magician in 2003 with $3,000. He developed the film while studying filmmaking at RMIT and shot it over 13 months with help from friends and family. Initially met with scepticism, the film gained attention at the St Kilda Film Festival, where it was noticed by Nash Edgerton, who helped re-edit it for theatrical release. The film eventually became the basis for Mr Inbetween.

In 2009, Ryan was cast in the Hollywood film Hesher, where he began rehearsals with Natalie Portman. However, Joseph Gordon-Levitt replaced him after John C. Reilly left the project. Despite this setback, Ryan eventually found success with Mr Inbetween.

Mr Inbetween, based on The Magician, premiered on FX in September 2018. The series follows Ray Shoesmith, a hitman balancing his personal and professional life. The character of Ray in the series is a more nuanced version of the one portrayed in The Magician. Nash Edgerton directed all episodes and served as executive producer. The series was well-received, developing a cult following in both the US and Australia.

In July 2020, Ryan signed with Creative Artists Agency (CAA) after actress Helen Mirren and her husband, director Taylor Hackford, encouraged their Hollywood agent to watch Mr Inbetween. This led to CAA representing Ryan and his future projects.

After completing three seasons of Mr Inbetween, Ryan confirmed that there would be no fourth season of the series. He shifted his focus to new projects, including a road-trip/serial-killer/bank-heist film provisionally titled Everybody Dies. Ryan has completed three drafts of the script and expressed interest in directing and starring in the film, potentially playing the serial killer. In 2023, Ryan was busy writing several projects, one of which is titled It's Coming This Way.

== Filmography ==
Year	Title	Role	Notes
2005	The Magician	Ray Shoesmith	
2018–2021	Mr Inbetween	Ray Shoesmith	26 episodes

== Awards and nominations ==
=== AACTA Awards ===
Year	Category	Nominated work	Result	ref'
2018	Best New Talent	Mr Inbetween	Won	
2019	Best Lead Actor in a Television Drama	Mr Inbetween	Won	
2021	Best Lead Actor in a Drama	Mr Inbetween	Won	
2021	Best Screenplay in Television	Mr Inbetween ("Ray Who?")	Won	

=== Logie Awards ===
Year	Category	Nominated work	Result	ref'
2019	Most Outstanding Actor	Mr Inbetween	Won	

=== Other awards ===
Year	Award	Category	Work	Result	ref'
2003	Melbourne Underground Film Festival	Best Actor	The Magician	Won	
2003	Melbourne Underground Film Festival	Best Director	The Magician	Won	
2005	Film Critics Circle of Australia Awards	Best Actor in a Lead Role	The Magician	Nominated	
2005	IF Awards	Best Actor	The Magician	Nominated	
2005	Independent Spirit Awards	Best Actor	The Magician	Nominated	
2018	Australian Writers' Guild	Comedy - Situation or Narrative	Mr Inbetween	Nominated	
2018	Screen Producers Australia Awards	Drama Series Production of the Year	Mr Inbetween	Won	
2019	The Equity Ensemble Awards	Outstanding Performance by an Ensemble in a Drama Series	Mr Inbetween	Nominated	
