= Nash Edgerton =

Australian film director and stuntman (born 1979)

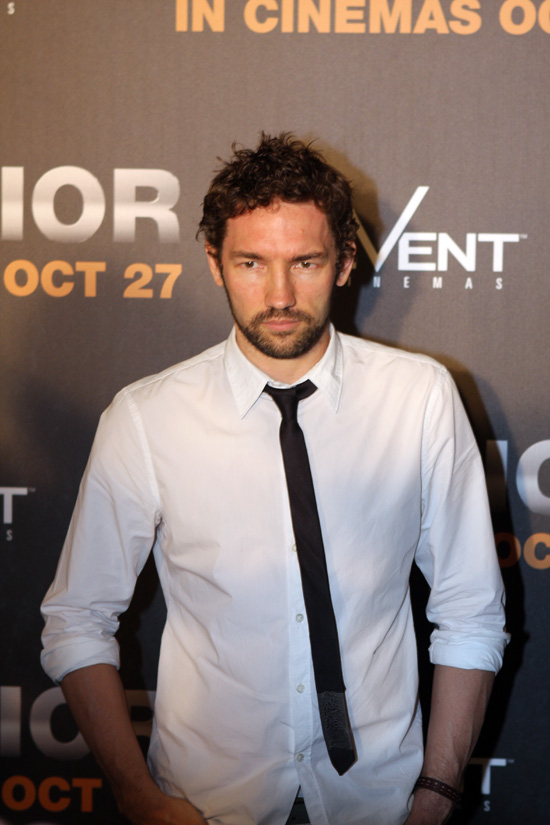
- Edgerton at a Warrior premiere in Israel on 16 October 2011
- Born: 19 January 1973 (age 53); Blacktown, New South Wales, Australia
- Occupations: Stuntman; filmmaker; actor
- Years active: 1991–present
- Spouse: Carla Ruffino (m. 2014)
- Children: 1
- Relatives: Joel Edgerton (brother)

Nash Edgerton (born 19 January 1973) is an Australian film director, stuntman and actor, and a principal member of the movie-making collective Blue-Tongue Films.

== Early life ==
Edgerton was born in Blacktown, New South Wales and grew up in Dural (both suburbs of Sydney). He attended The Hills Grammar School. He is the son of Marianne (van Dort), a homemaker, and Michael Edgerton, a solicitor and property developer. His younger brother is actor Joel Edgerton. His mother is a Dutch immigrant who was born in The Hague.

== Career ==
=== Stuntman ===
As a stuntman, he has worked on such films as The Matrix trilogy, The Thin Red Line, Superman Returns, and, most notably, Star Wars: Episode II – Attack of the Clones and Star Wars: Episode III – Revenge of the Sith, as the stunt double for Ewan McGregor, who played Obi-Wan Kenobi. His brother Joel appeared in those same films as young Owen Lars.

=== Director ===
Throughout Edgerton's career, he has made critically well-received short films often starring himself, such as his trilogy of Spider, Bear and Shark. He has also directed a total of four music videos for artist Bob Dylan ("Beyond Here Lies Nothin'", "Must Be Santa", "Duquesne Whistle", and "The Night We Called It a Day"). His feature-length directorial debut was The Square (2008), an Australian neo-noir thriller. His most recent film as director was Gringo, released in 2018.

From 2018 to 2021, Edgerton directed every episode of Mr Inbetween, an Australian television black comedy-drama series starring and written by Scott Ryan. The series is adapted from Ryan's 2005 film The Magician, which Edgerton helped Ryan expand from a short film. Edgerton's stepdaughter Chika Yasumura appears in the series as the daughter of Ryan's character.

== Personal life ==
Edgerton began dating Carla Ruffino in 2011 and they married on 1 April 2014. He is stepfather to her daughter from a previous marriage, Chika Yasumura. They have one daughter together, born in 2015.

== Filmography ==
=== Film ===
- Police Rescue In Action (1994) as Alex's mate (TV special)
- Loaded (1996) as Richard - Short film co-directed by Kieran Darcy-Smith
- Deadline (1997) as Young filmmaker - Short film
- Bloodlock (1998) as Ian - Short film (co-directed by Kieran Darcy-Smith)
- Two Hands (1999) - Stunts
- The Matrix (1999) as Resistance Member / Stunt double, uncredited
- The Pitch (2001) - Short film
- Moulin Rouge! (2001) as Stagehand - Stunt team, uncredited
- Star Wars: Episode II – Attack of the Clones (2002) - Stunts
- Fuel (2003) - Short film
- The Matrix Reloaded (2003) as Security Guard #5
- The Matrix Revolutions (2003) - Stunts
- Lucky (2005) - Short film
- The IF Thing (2005) - Short film
- Star Wars: Episode III – Revenge of the Sith (2005) - Stunts
- Macbeth (2006) as Macdonwald - Stunts
- Superman Returns (2006) - Stunts
- Spider (2007) - Short film
- Hammer Bay (2007) - TV movie
- The Square (2008) - Director
- Hesher (2010) - Stunt coordinator
- Knight and Day (2010) - Stunts
- Bear (2011) - Short film
- I Am Number Four (2011) as Mog - Stunts
- Zero Dark Thirty (2012) as Nate - DEVGRU EOD - Stunt double
- The Great Gatsby (2013) - Stunt double / stunt performer
- The Bling Ring (2013) - Stunt coordinator
- The Wolverine (2013) - Stunts
- Felony (2013) - Stunt coordinator / stunt double
- The Rover (2014) as Town Soldier
- Son of a Gun (2014) as Chris
- The Equalizer (2014) as Teddy's Guy - Stunts (uncredited)
- Jane Got a Gun (2015) as Fur Trader - Stunts
- The Gift (2015) as Frank Dale - Stunts
- Straight Outta Compton (2015) - Stunts
- American Ultra (2015) as Beedle - Stunts
- Sinister 2 (2015) - Stunts
- Miles Ahead (2015) - Stunt double
- The Nice Guys (2016) - Stunts (uncredited)
- The Darkness (2016) - Stunt coordinator
- American Pastoral (2016) - Stunt coordinator
- 20th Century Women (2016) - Stunt coordinator
- Please Stand By (2017) - Stunt coordinator
- Bright (2017) - Stunts
- Bleeding Steel (2017) - Stunts
- American Express (2017)
- Boy Erased (2018) - Stunt coordinator
- Gringo (2018) - Director
- Little Monsters (2019) - Stunts
- Once Upon a Time in Hollywood (2019) - Stunt performer / stunts
- Babyteeth (2019) - Stunt coordinator
- All the Bright Places (2020) - Stunt coordinator
- The Invisible Man (2020) as Security Guard
- Shark (2021) - Short film

=== Television ===
- Love Child (2016) - Stunts, 1 episode
- Mr Inbetween (2018) as Trent, 1 episode - Director, 26 episodes
- Wolf Like Me (2022) - Guest appearance
- Bodkin (2024) - Director, 2 episodes

=== Music videos ===
- "Liar" by Eskimo Joe (2002) - Director
- "Comfort Me" by Shihad (2002) - Director
- "Something Borrowed, Something Blue" by Ben Lee (2002) - Director
- "Good Dancers" by The Sleepy Jackson (2004) - Director
- "Must Be Santa" by Bob Dylan (2009) - Director
- "Beyond Here Lies Nothin'" by Bob Dylan (2009) - Director
- "Half Mast (Slight Return)" by Empire of the Sun (2010) - Director
- "Crossfire" by Brandon Flowers (2010) - Director
- "Strong" by London Grammar - Actor
- "Duquesne Whistle" by Bob Dylan (2012) - Director
- "The Night We Called It a Day" by Bob Dylan (2015) - Director
- "Show Business" by Hilltop Hoods feat. Eamon (2012) - Director

== Awards and nominations ==
=== ARIA Music Awards ===
The ARIA Music Awards is an annual awards ceremony that recognises excellence, innovation, and achievement across all genres of Australian music. They commenced in 1987.

Year	Nominee / work	Award	Result	Ref.
2002	Nash Edgerton for Eskimo Joe's "Liar"	Best Video	Nominated	
2004	Nash Edgerton for The Sleepy Jackson's "Good Dancers"	Best Video	Nominated	
