= Geena Davis Institute =

American nonprofit research organization

- Formation: 2004; 22 years ago
- Founder: Geena Davis
- Type: Nonprofit
- Legal status: Research institute
- Key people: Madeline Di Nonno (President, CEO) Geena Davis (chair)
- Website: geenadavisinstitute.org

The Geena Davis Institute (formerly Geena Davis Institute on Gender in Media) is an American nonprofit organization based in Marina del Rey, California, led by president and CEO Madeline Di Nonno and chaired by Davis. It operates on a philosophy of gathering and sharing data instead of blaming studios for lack of equal representation in an effort to effect change.

== History ==
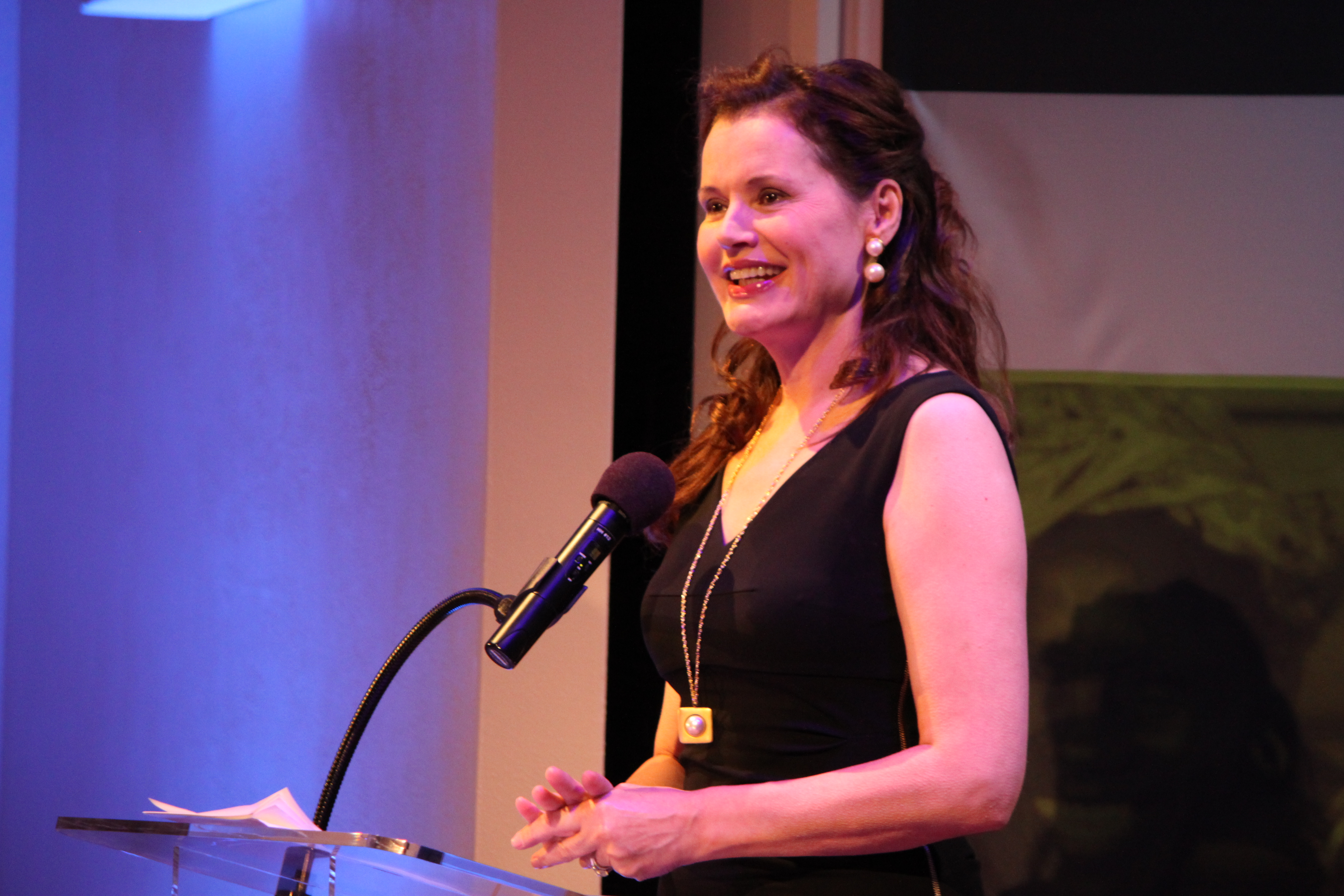
Geena Davis gives a speech at Millennium Development Goals Countdown, an event held in the Ford Foundation Building in Manhattan about gender roles and associated topics in film, September 2013

In 2004, the Geena Davis Institute on Gender in Media was founded by Geena Davis at Mount Saint Mary's University.

"In 2005, along with Geena Davis, DADs launched the See Jane program to increase the percentages of female characters and reduce gender stereotyping in media made for children 11 and under." - Dads and Daughters

She founded the Institute to gather data on gender representation in media after noticing an imbalance in the representation of male and female characters in children's television while her daughter was a toddler. Later, GDI expanded its research to include other types of representation including gender identity, sexual orientation, disability, age, and body type. Her operating assumption was that more data was needed to effect change and generate more equal representation.

In 2010, GDI and the Academy of Television Arts & Sciences Foundation partnered to create an award presented at the College Television Awards, recognizing student productions for displays of diversity and gender equality in their work. The organization worked with Ford Motor Company in 2017 to create a video series called #ShesGotDrive, which aimed to "(challenge) stereotypes in media targeted at children". GDI received a Governors Award in 2022 from the Academy of Television Arts & Sciences for its efforts to improve equal gender representation in entertainment.

== Research, advocacy, and impact ==
GDI publishes annual research on the representation of various groups in media. Topics have included general representation of characters in media by gender, occupational surveys of characters, and speaking roles of characters by gender. In 2012, GDI received a US$1.2 million grant from Google. Also in 2012, the organization released the Geena Davis Inclusion Quotient video and sound recognition software with algorithms which identify the gender and screentime of characters in media. While examining films released in 2014 and 2015, the software found male characters were present on screen approximately twice as often as female characters. By 2019, the software discovered that gender representation in children's television was approximately equal, with female roles slightly exceeding male roles.

GDI launched the Global Symposium on Gender in Media internationally in 2015 at the BFI London Film Festival. In 2017, 21st Century Fox commissioned GDI to research The Scully Effect. The organization discovered that 63 percent of women in STEM fields attributed their career to The X-Files character Dana Scully. In 2018, GDI and the Lyda Hill Foundation conducted a study on representation of women in STEM careers in media finding that the representation of men in STEM fields was approximately double that of women, and that the imbalance in representation is perhaps discouraging girls from pursuing STEM careers.

GDI and the University of Southern California's Signal Analysis and Interpretation Laboratory partnered to create Spellcheck for Bias, artificial intelligence software that analyzes screenplays for "stereotypes and other problematic choices", including gender, race, disability status, and sexual orientation. Disney began using the software in 2019 to examine gender representation in its productions and Universal Filmed Entertainment Group began using it in 2020 to identify representation of Latinx characters in its productions.

After seeing the results of a survey conducted by GDI and commissioned by The Lego Group (TLG), TLG announced in 2021 changes to its toy lineup to remove gender stereotypes. GDI, Rose Pictures, and Besties Make Movies partnered to create the documentary Nothing Fits, announced in 2023. The film analyzes the intersection of media, the fashion industry, and body image. In 2023, it was announced that GDI would co-produce a Canadian adaptation of the documentary This Changes Everything.

== See also ==
- Exploitation of women in mass media
- Feminism and media
- Gender equality
- Media and gender
- Misogyny and mass media
- Harry Cook
