= Harry Cook (actor) =

British/Australian actor and writer

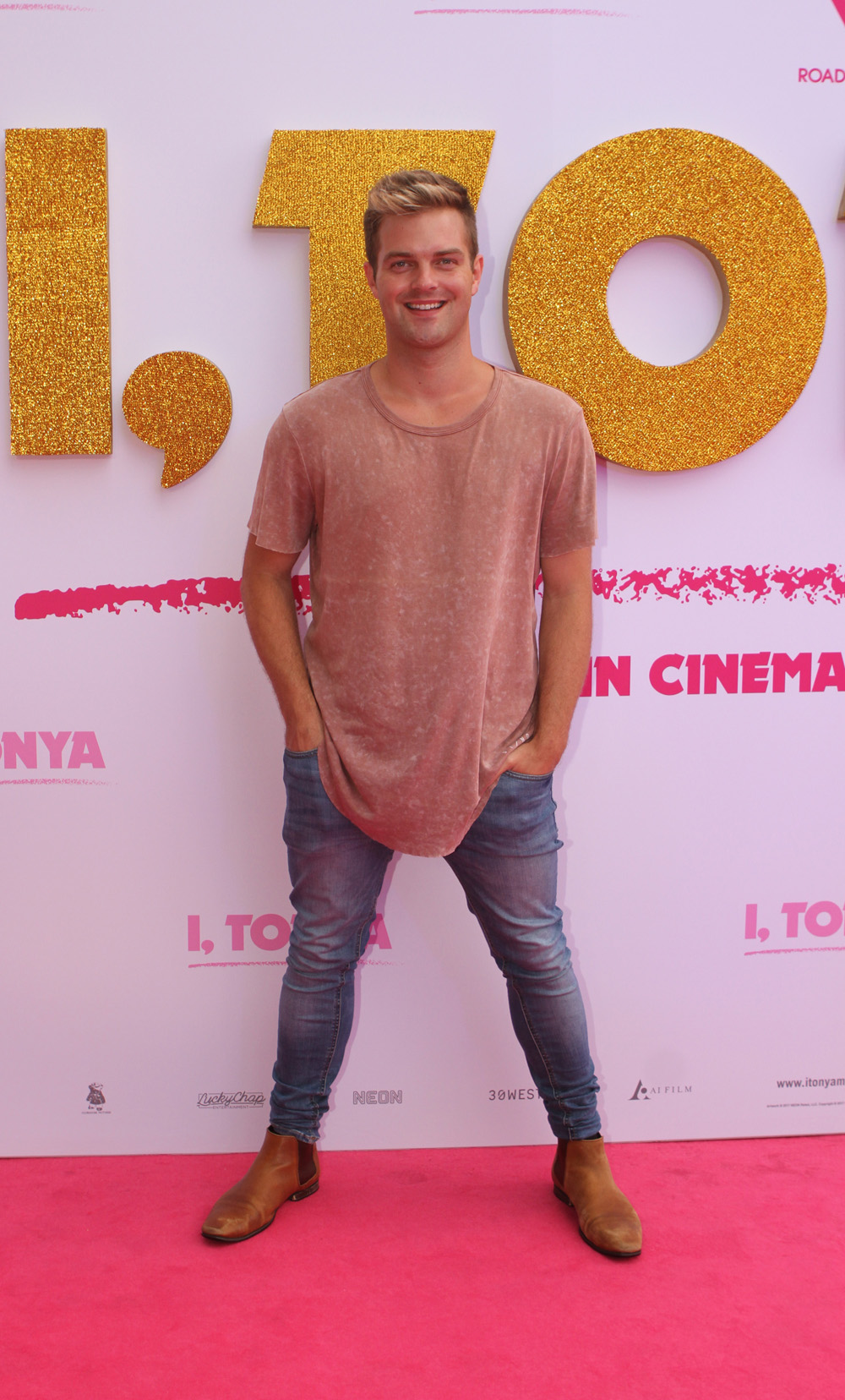
- Harry Cook attending the I, Tonya premiere
- Born: Harry John Cook; 12 June 1991 (age 35); Croydon, London, England
- Occupations: actor; writer
- Years active: 2008–present
- Notable work: Accidents Happen (2010); Caught Inside (2010); Drown (2015)
- Spouse: Liam Davis (m. 2015; div. 2018)
- Awards: FilmOut San Diego; Best Supporting Actor; Winner; Drown (2015); Australian LGBTI Awards; LGBTI Celebrity of the Year; Nominee; 2017; Australian LGBTI Awards; LGBTI Celebrity of the Year; Nominee; 2018; Australian LGBTI Awards; LGBTI Local Icon; Nominee; 2019

Harry Cook (born 12 June 1991) is a British-Australian actor and writer.

== Early life ==
Born in Croydon, South London, Cook moved to Australia with his family in 2001 when he was ten years old. After leaving school he completed his Year 10 school certificate at TAFE.

== Acting career ==
Cook is best known for his roles in early 2000s films such as Accidents Happen (2009), Caught Inside (2010), Panic at Rock Island (2010), Drown (2015) and I Love You Both (2015). His role in Drown earned him a Best Supporting Actor Award at FilmOut San Diego in 2015.

On television, he has appeared in minor roles on My Place (2009), Old School (2014), Mr Inbetween (2018), Diary of an Uber Driver (2019), Bump (2021) and Home and Away (2025).

== Writing ==
In September 2018, Cook's debut memoir, Pink Ink, was released to largely positive reviews. His debut young adult novel, Fin & Rye & Fireflies, was released in August 2020 through Black and White Publishing's imprint Ink Road Books. It won the Scottish Book Trust's Teenage Book Prize in 2022. In 2021, Cook released his second YA novel, Felix Silver, Teaspoons & Witches, via Duet/Interlude Press, an imprint of Chicago Review Press, to mixed reviews. Kirkus Reviews wrote that "the cobweb-thin plot is less than enchanting", "the characters are not deeply developed" and "all main characters are coded as white". Publishers Weekly described the plot as "thinly developed" and "hurtling toward a familiar conclusion", but complimented Cook's "accessible" prose.

== Political activism ==
Cook was active in the campaign for marriage equality in Australia, particularly in the lead-up to the Australian Marriage Law Postal Survey in 2017. In 2016, he was nominated as LGBTQ Celebrity of the Year at the inaugural Australian LGBTQ Awards held at the Sydney Opera House for his work as an openly gay activist and actor. He was nominated again the following year, and was nominated for the LGBTI Local Icon Award at the 2019 Australian LGBTI Awards.

Since the October 7 attacks in 2023 and the outbreak of the Gaza war, Cook has been a vocal critic of Israel and of the Jewish community. Some of his commentary has attracted public controversy, including his claims that the 2025 Bondi Beach massacre, the 2001 September 11 attacks and the 1963 assassination of John F. Kennedy were "false flag" attacks organised by Israel, and his calls to boycott Jewish-owned businesses in Australia. He has described Jews as "demons" and the Talmud as their "spell book", and has shared eugenicist and Neo-Nazi claims that Ashkenazi Jews have an "incestuous" "gene pool". In August 2026 Cook posted a video to social media in which he promoted Holocaust denial and defended Adolf Hitler, including Hitler's claims that the 1917 Bolshevik revolution was a "Jewish coup" and that Jews were responsible for hyperinflation in Germany after the First World War. Cook cautioned against trusting the testimony of Holocaust survivors and warned about an "international world swindle" perpetrated by Jews.

== Personal life ==
Cook came out as gay in 2013. He married Liam Davis in November 2015 in Carmel, California. They announced their separation in 2019.

Cook has described himself as sober and has discussed his recovery from drug and alcohol addiction. He has been an ambassador for the Hello Sunday Morning sobriety program.

Cook has discussed his "life-long" friendship with American actor Geena Davis, describing her as "instrumental" to his career after they appeared together in Accidents Happen. Until 2026, Cook was an ambassador for the Geena Davis Institute. In May 2026, the Institute publicly distanced itself from Cook's political commentary and removed his profile from its website.

== Filmography ==
=== Film ===
Year	Title	Role	Notes
2009	Accidents Happen	Larry Conway	
2010	Caught Inside	Archie Cox	
2010	Panic at Rock Island	Chook	TV movie
2010	The Fall	Vincent	Short
2015	Drown	Meat	
2016	I Love You Both	Drew Johnston	

=== TV series ===
Year	Title	Role
2009	My Place	Tom Muller
2015	Old School	Jordan Wallis
2019	Diary of an Uber Driver	Mike Fisher
2021	Mr Inbetween	Lucas Channing
2021	Bump	Netball player
2025	Home and Away	Police constable

=== Theatre ===
Year	Title	Role
2001	Oliver!	The Artful Dodger
2001	Bugsy Malone	Bugsy Malone
2008	Macbeth	Banquo
2009	Citizenship	Tom
2012	Russetts (International Playwright Competition Cambridge, UK)	Duncan
2016	RENT	Mark Cohen
2018	Bushfire	Simon Crncevic
2018	Spindrift	Snowy
2019	Preserving Jars	Tim/Policeman
2019	Promiscuous Cities	Richard/Jack/M1

== Books ==
Year	Title
2018	Pink Ink
2020	Fin & Rye & Fireflies
2021	Felix Silver, Teaspoons & Witches
