= Ray Conway =

Ray Conway may refer to:

- Ray Conway, character in General Hospital
- Ray Conway, character in Accidents Happen
