= Sebastian Gregory =

Australian actor and musician (born 1990)

- Born: 3 March 1990 (age 36); Melbourne, Australia
- Occupations: Actor, musician
- Years active: 2004–present

Sebastian Gregory (born 3 March 1990) is an Australian actor and musician. He is a self-taught guitarist, drummer and songwriter, who formed a band called Menace when he was thirteen. After being spotted in his own music video, Gregory was signed to an acting management agency. He has appeared in a number of short films, commercials and theatre productions. He made his first television appearance in a 2004 episode of Blue Heelers. Two years later he landed a recurring role in the soap opera Neighbours. Gregory made his feature film debut in Acolytes. This was followed by a role in 2009 film Beautiful and a regular role in children's television series The Elephant Princess. Gregory's next film roles were in comedy films Accidents Happen and A Heartbeat Away. In April 2012, Gregory joined the cast of Neighbours for a second time.

== Early life ==
Gregory was born in Melbourne, Australia in the early 1990s. He was given a drum kit when he was ten years old, and he toured hotels and clubs when he was eleven. Gregory is a self-taught guitarist, drummer and songwriter. He formed a band called Menace when he was thirteen. Production team Xenomania took the band to London, where they were offered a recording contract. Gregory was also signed to an acting management agency after he was spotted in his own music video.

== Career ==
In 2004 Gregory guested as Rohan Shanley in an episode of Blue Heelers. Two years later, he played the recurring role of Garrett Burns, a love interest for Rachel Kinski (Caitlin Stasey), in the soap opera Neighbours.

He made his feature film debut in Jon Hewitt's Acolytes. He plays Mark, a teenager who becomes involved in murder and violence. Principal photography on the film began in April 2007 in Queensland. Gregory's band, Menace, had two songs featured on the soundtrack. Shortly after, Gregory was cast in Beautiful a film by writer-director Dean O'Flaherty. Of his role as Danny in the film, Gregory told Sacha Molitorisz of The Sydney Morning Herald "I always seem to be playing a weird, freaky kid. But there's something really beautiful about Danny." For his portrayal of Danny, Gregory earned a nomination for Best Young Actor at the 2009 Australian Film Institute Awards.

Gregory was cast in the regular role of JB Deekes in the children's television series The Elephant Princess in 2008. His Menace bandmates made a cameo appearance in episode seven of The Elephant Princess and one of their tracks was also featured. In June 2008, Gregory joined the cast of the dark comedy film Accidents Happen, which is based on a semi-autobiographical screenplay by Brian Carbee. Gregory originally auditioned for a different role, but the filmmakers thought he would be perfect for the character Doug Post instead. Accidents Happen was shot in Sydney and released in 2009.

In 2011, Gregory starred alongside Isabel Lucas in the Australian musical comedy film A Heartbeat Away. In April 2012, it was announced Gregory had re-joined the supporting cast of Neighbours as "mathematics genius" Ed Lee. He was contracted for four-months and began appearing from 8 June 2012. Gregory then appeared in Return to Nim's Island, which was filmed on the Gold Coast in August 2012.

Gregory played drummer Dylan James in the 2017 supernatural thriller American Satan. The role was later recast to James Cassells for the television spin-off Paradise City. He also stars as a struggling artist amidst the American heroin epidemic in the 2018 drama film Shooting in Vain.

== Filmography ==
=== Film ===
Year	Title	Role	Notes
2008	Acolytes	Mark	
2008	Buses and Trains	Young Chef	Short
2009	Beautiful	Danny Hobson	
2009	Accidents Happen	Doug Post	
2011	A Heartbeat Away	Kevin Flack	
2013	Return to Nim's Island	Frankie	
2013	No Genes Attached: Official Trailer	Son	Video
2017	American Satan	Dylan James	
2018	Shooting in Vain	Max Young	

=== Television ===
Year	Title	Role	Notes
2004	Blue Heelers	Rohan Shanley	"Happily Ever After"
2006	Neighbours	Garrett Burns	Recurring role
2008–09	The Elephant Princess	JB Deekes	Main role (season 1)
2012	Neighbours	Ed Lee	Recurring role
2016	All You Need Is Me	Phil	TV miniseries
