= Isabel Lucas =

Australian actress and model (born 1985)

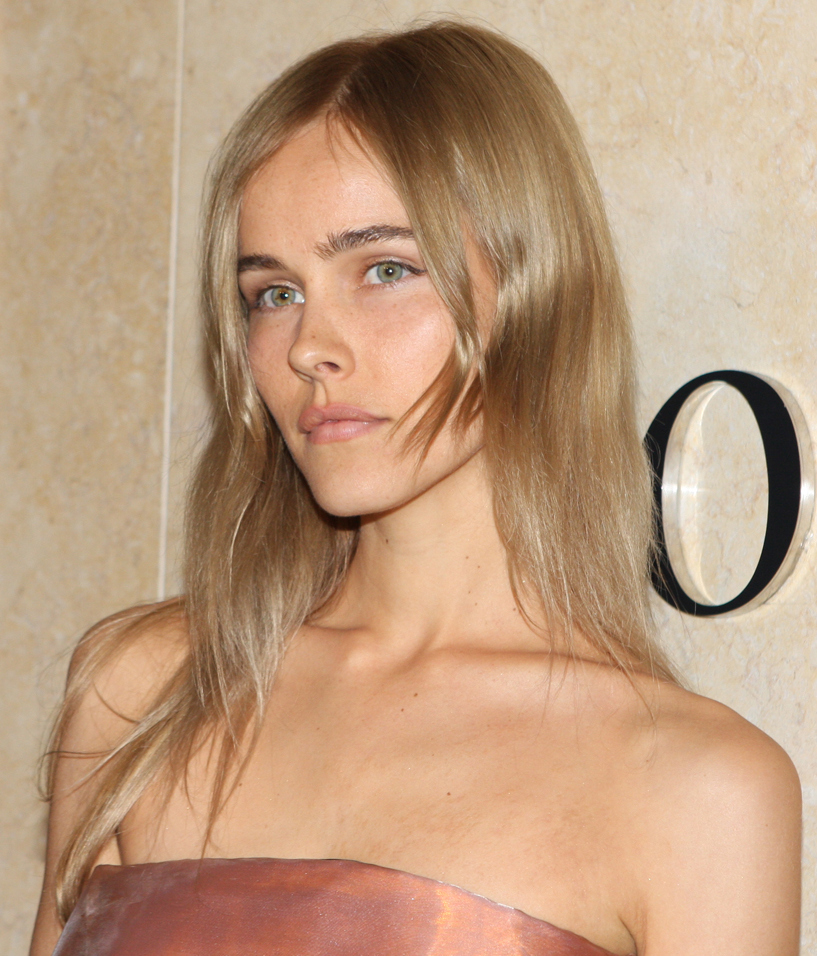
- Lucas at the opening of the Christian Dior couture Sydney CBD store in January 2013
- Born: 29 January 1985 (age 41); Melbourne, Victoria, Australia
- Occupations: Actress; model; environmentalist
- Years active: 2003–present
- Children: 1

Isabel Lucas (born 29 January 1985) is an Australian actress, environmentalist and model. She is best known for her roles in Home and Away (2003–06), Transformers: Revenge of the Fallen (2009), Daybreakers (2009), The Waiting City (2009), The Pacific (2010), Immortals (2011), A Heartbeat Away (2011), Red Dawn (2012), The Loft (2014), The Water Diviner (2014), Knight of Cups (2015), and That's Not Me (2017). In 2015, she acted beside Nick Jonas in the thriller film Careful What You Wish For. In 2017, Lucas joined the American television series MacGyver. In 2018, she appeared in In Like Flynn which was a success in Australia, New Zealand, and Britain, and the same year played Brooke in Chasing Comets.

In 2009, Lucas won Best Breakout Performance Female at SPIKE TV's 2009 Scream Awards for her role in Transformers: Revenge of the Fallen. In 2011 Lucas won a Young Hollywood Award for Female Star of Tomorrow. In 2012, Lucas starred in Ed Sheeran's "Give Me Love" music video.

== Early life ==
Isabel Lucas was born in Melbourne, Australia, on 29 January 1985, and is the daughter of Andrew, a biodynamic farmer and retired pilot, and Beatrice, a special education teacher. Her father is Australian and her mother is Swiss. Her older sister works as an environmental lawyer. Lucas can speak French and Swiss-German in addition to English. As a child, Lucas lived in Cairns, Queensland. She also lived in Lucerne, Switzerland and Kakadu, in Australia's Northern Territory. Growing up on a farm, she has ridden horses since the age of 10 and competed in dressage and show jumping with her sister. Lucas attended St. Monica's College in Cairns.

== Career ==
=== 2003–2015: Home and Away and Hollywood ===
Lucas was involved in drama during her school years and attended courses at the Victorian College of Arts and Queensland University of Technology. In 2002, her now agent Sharron Meissner claimed to have discovered Lucas walking on the beach at Port Douglas. In fact, the meeting was arranged well before. Lucas auditioned for the role of Kit Hunter in Home and Away; although the producer of the show, Julie McGauran, felt that role was not right for Isabel, she was sufficiently impressed to have a new character, Tasha Andrews, created just for her.

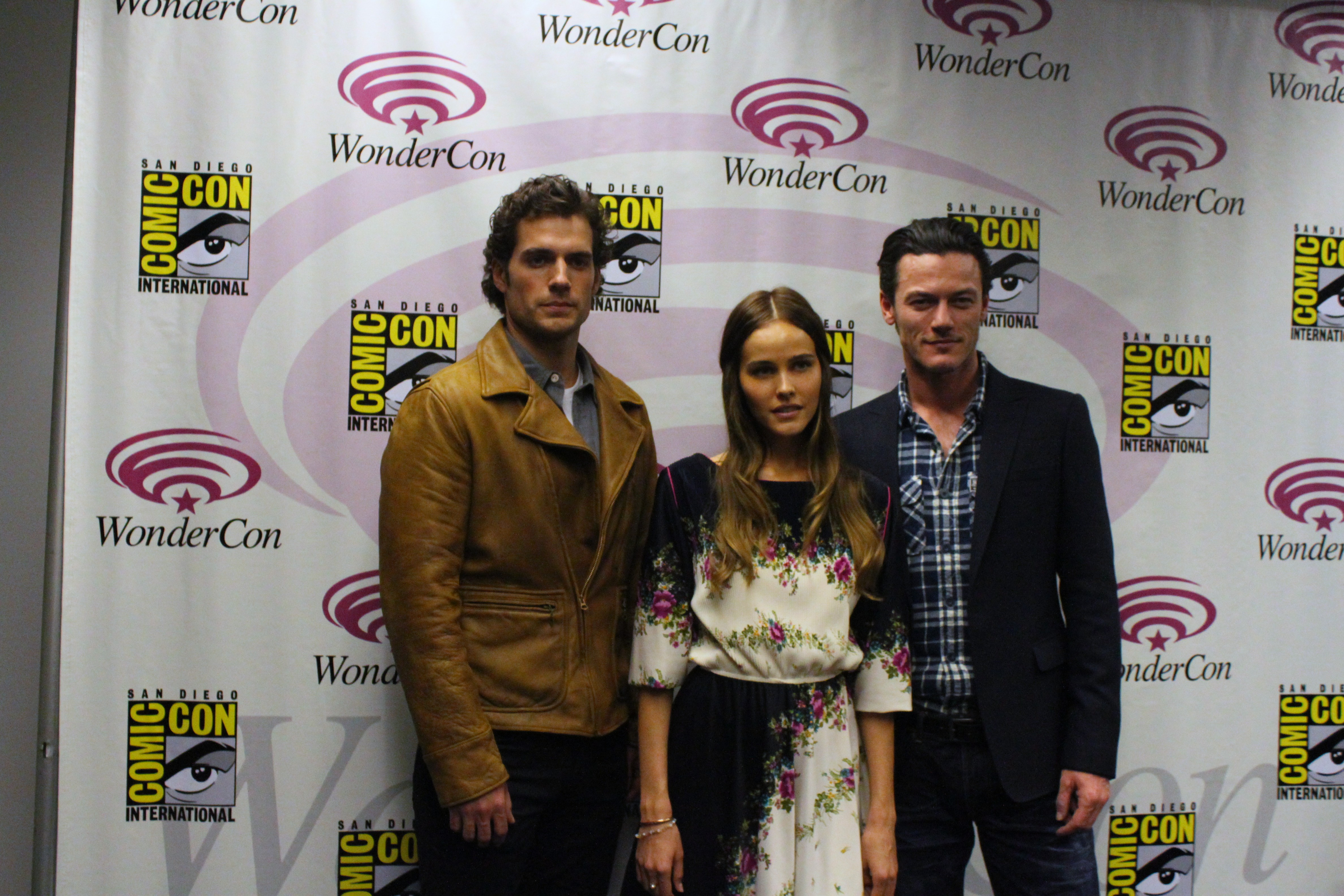
Isabel Lucas at the 2011 Wondercon in San Francisco, with Henry Cavill and Luke Evans

In 2007, she focused on saving dolphins in Japan, and in October of that year appeared on the Australian Today Show to discuss this topic. In 2008, Lucas moved to Los Angeles to pursue her acting career further.

While working with Steven Spielberg on the World War II miniseries, The Pacific, he suggested Lucas for the role of Alice in the 2009 film Transformers: Revenge of the Fallen, sequel to Transformers (2007), where Spielberg was serving as the series's executive producer. This later became the debut role of Lucas's career, earning her the award for Best Breakout Performance-Female in sci-fi and action at the 2009 Scream Awards. In a much later interview with Rove, Lucas described the audition process for the role as "very interesting" and drastically different from when she auditioned for other roles prior to Transformers. She also said that the filming process was a lot different from Home Away, where she would spend hours shooting various episodes all in one go.

In 2008, Lucas was cast in the vampire science-fiction thriller film Daybreakers and in 2009, she was cast as the character Erica Martin in the remake of the 1984 film Red Dawn alongside fellow Australian actor Chris Hemsworth, which was ultimately released in November 2012. In 2009, Lucas played Scarlett in the romantic film The Waiting City.

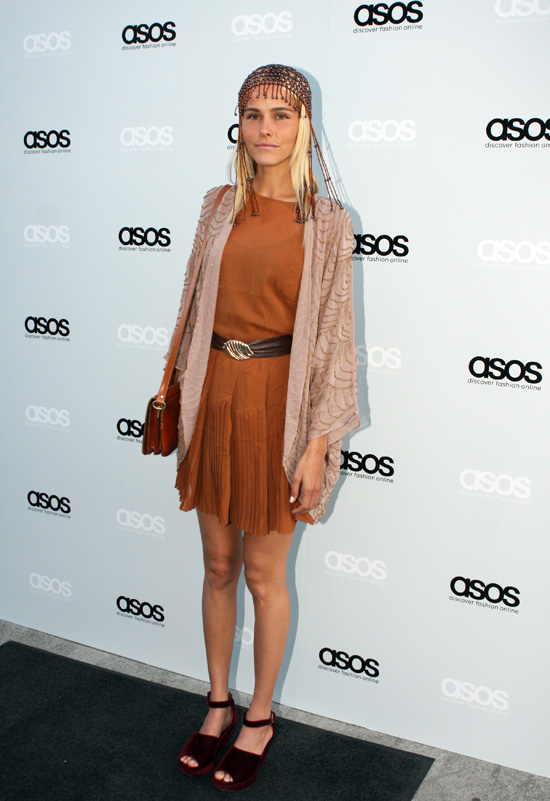
Lucas at the Asos Fashion launch in October 2011

In 2011, Lucas played the goddess Athena in the fantasy film Immortals, and signed on to appear in the film Knight of Cups, which was released in 2015. In November 2012, Lucas was featured as the main character in the music video for "Give Me Love" by British singer-songwriter Ed Sheeran.

In March 2013, it was announced that Lucas would star in the thriller Careful What You Wish For, which was released in June 2016. In 2014, Lucas was featured in the documentary That Sugar Film directed by Damon Gameau, on the topic of the effect that sugar has on the human body, and the need to eat truly healthy foods.

=== 2016–present: MacGyver and return to Australian film ===
In 2017, Lucas appeared in the Australian comedy-drama film, That's Not Me, beside Alice Foulcher, Richard Davies, and Rowan Davie, which was released worldwide on 7 September the same year.

From 2017 to 2018, Lucas played Samantha Cage in CBS's remake of the series MacGyver. Lucas left her role as Samantha Cage in June 2018.

She began filming the Australian biographical-drama film In Like Flynn in February 2017, with British and Australian actors William Moseley, Clive Standen, Corey William Large, David Wenham and actress Nathalie Kelley. The film was released to Australia on 11 October 2018. It was later released worldwide in January 2019. In the same year, Lucas played Brooke in Chasing Comets, a biographical-drama comedy on the life of Chase, a famous Australian rugby league player. The same year, she played Kali Stewart in Shooting in Vain, a drama thriller starring Sebastian Gregory, Diana Hopper, and Colleen Kelly.

Lucas appeared in the Australian drama-thriller Shooting in Vain, directed by Jared Januscka, which was released on worldwide in 2018. It stars Alexandra Park, Diana Hopper, and Sebastian Gregory. Later in 2018, she appeared in In Like Flynn as the character Rose. The film became a success in Australia, New Zealand, and Britain, rating as a 66–70% after its opening weekend. It was later released worldwide the following year on 25 January.

In 2022, Lucas starred alongside Luke Hemsworth and Rasmus King in a drama-film, Bosch & Rockit (Ocean Boy). She later appeared as Katie in Sons of Summer, a crime-action film that was released on July 28, 2023.

== Personal life ==
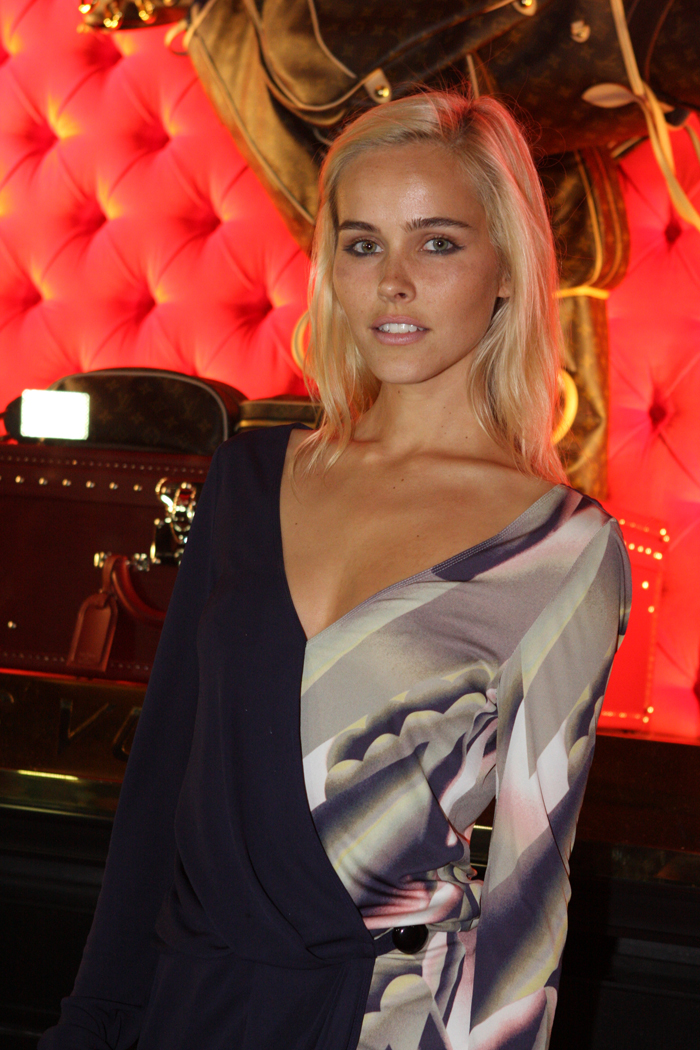
Lucas at a Louis Vuitton store VIP party in Sydney, December 2011

Lucas has been described as having a shy and quiet personality. She has spoken about being overwhelmed by how people would see her when she went on her first audition for Home and Away. Acting has since helped her become confident and sociable.

Lucas dated Chris Hemsworth after meeting him on the set of Home and Away, between 2005 and 2008. She then dated American actor Adrian Grenier, who broke up with her in July 2008 following her car accident also involving American actor Shia LaBeouf; Grenier saw Lucas hanging out with LaBeouf. Lucas was in a relationship with Australian folk singer Angus Stone from 2010 to 2012.

Lucas became a vegetarian after watching the documentary Earthlings in the house of Anthony Kiedis. In addition to her vegetarianism, Lucas is an animal lover and has stated that she has been so since childhood.

Lucas relocated to Australia from the United States in 2016 to work on Australian films that were in production at the time. In an article released after her departure from the U.S., she explained that she moved back to Australia to be around her family more and for the advantages of working on films in her home country. Lucas also stated that she usually travels back and forth between Los Angeles and Australia for films but prefers Australia as her permanent residence. She resides in Byron Bay.

In 2020, Lucas opted out of COVID-19 testing during the filming of Bosch & Rockit despite testing being mandatory for participation in the shoot. She lost her charity ambassador role with Plan International Australia in April that year because of her comments on vaccines, including that she did not "trust the path" of vaccination. She also supported anti-5G theories regarding its rollout in Australia and was a guest speaker at an anti-5G rally in October 2020 in Byron Bay, stating that 5G could be "potentially ushering a regime of total surveillance". In February 2021, Lucas showed support for Australian chef Pete Evans, who was banned from Instagram for his views on COVID-19 and vaccination, in an Instagram post about freedom of speech, comparing Evans to historical change-makers such as Jesus.

== Activism ==
In October 2007, Lucas was part of a group of 30 people from Surfers for Cetaceans, including American actress Hayden Panettiere and surfers David Rastovich and Vaya Phrachanh, who took part in a protest against dolphin culling in Taiji, Wakayama, Japan. The group paddled out on surfboards to the dolphins in an attempt to stop the hunt, but they were forced to turn around after being intercepted by one of the fishing boats. They drove straight to Kansai International Airport and left the country to avoid being arrested for trespassing by the Japanese police. There is still an outstanding arrest warrant for Lucas in Japan.

In 2004, Lucas served as a spokesperson for the Australian National Breast Cancer Foundation and provided support to many organisations, including World Vision as of 2009, The Humour Foundation as of 2004, Oxfam Community Aid Abroad as of 2006, Global Green Plan as of 2009, Save the Whales Again as of 2010 and Sea Shepherd as of 2012. In 2010, Lucas and the Summit on the Summit team climbed to the top of Mount Kilimanjaro to raise awareness of the global clean water crisis.

== Filmography ==
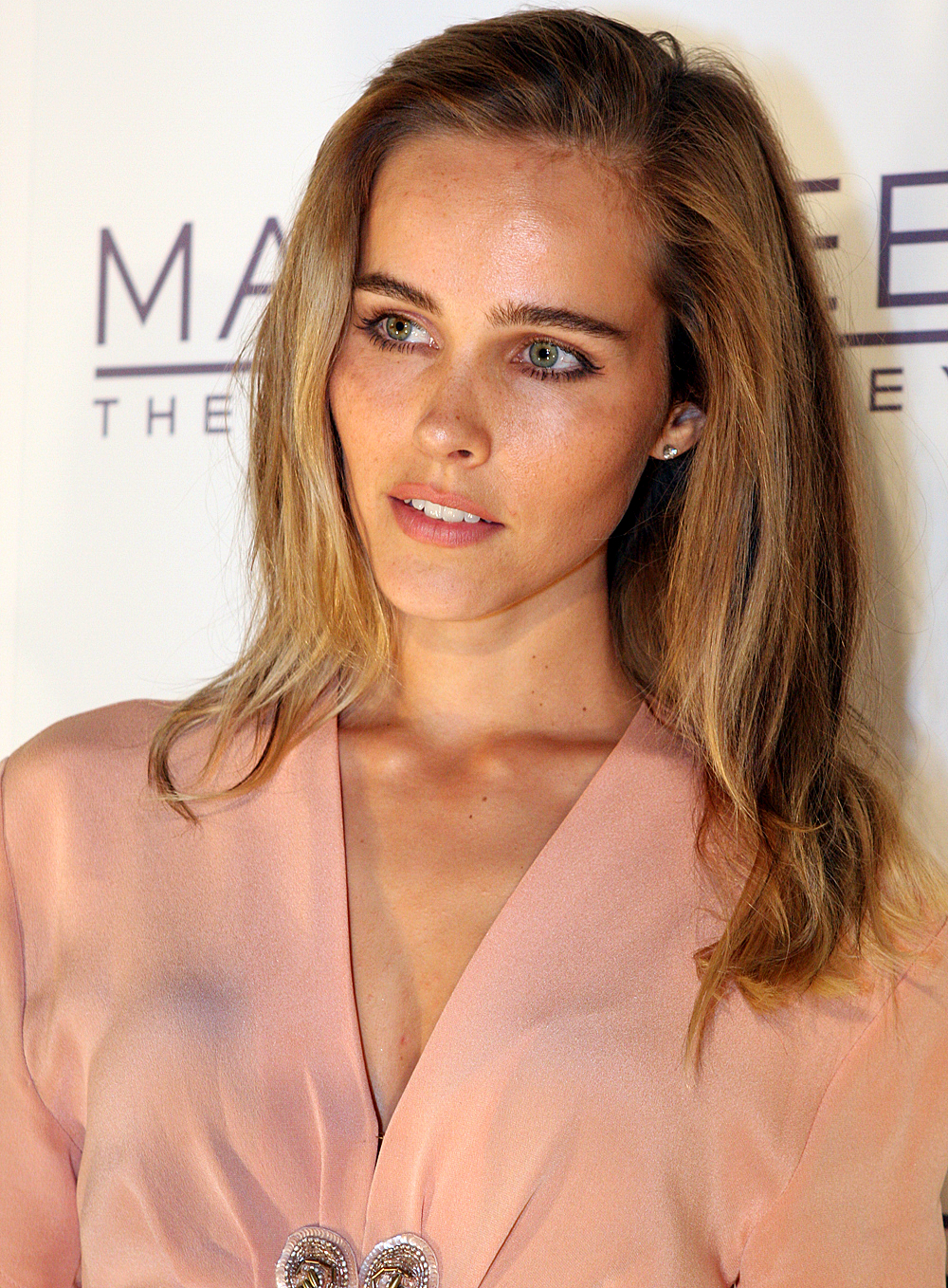
Lucas at the Pave Low Festival, USA: Celebrating Age Of The Rising Stallion, 30 March 2012

=== Film ===
Year	Title	Role	Notes
2009	Transformers: Revenge of the Fallen	Alice	
2009	Daybreakers	Alison Bromley	
2009	The Waiting City	Scarlett	
2009	The Cove	Herself	Documentary
2010	The Wedding Party	Anna Petrov	
2011	A Heartbeat Away	Mandy Riddick	
2011	Immortals	Athena	
2012	Age Of The Rising Stallion	Audrey Mackenzie	
2012	Red Dawn	Erica Martin	
2014	Electric Slide	Pauline	
2014	That Sugar Film	Herself	Documentary
2014	The Loft	Sarah Deakins	
2014	The Water Diviner	Natalia	
2014	Engram		Short film
2015	Knight of Cups	Isabel	
2015	Careful What You Wish For	Lena Harper	
2016	The 11th	Sisse	
2016	The Osiris Child: Science Fiction Volume One	Gyp	
2017	That's Not Me	Zoe Cooper	
2018	Chasing Comets	Brooke	
2018	Shooting in Vain	Kali Stewart	
2018	In Like Flynn	Rose	
2019	In the Night	Marie	Short film
2022	Bosch & Rockit	Deb	
2023	Sons of Summer	Katie	
2024	Lunacy	Silkworm	

=== Television ===
Year	Title	Role	Notes
2003–2006	Home and Away	Tasha Andrews	Regular role
2010	The Pacific	Gwen	Episode: "Melbourne"
2017	Emerald City	Anna	Recurring role
2017–2018	MacGyver	Samantha Cage	Regular role

== Nominations, awards and other recognition ==
Lucas won a Logie Award for new popular talent for her performance in the Home and Away series, and won the best Breakout Performance-Female at the 2009 Scream Awards on 17 October 2009, for her performance of Alice in Transformers: Revenge of the Fallen. Other awards and nominations appear in the table below.

Lucas, a vegetarian, was nominated as one of Australia's Sexiest Vegetarian Celebrities on PETAAsiaPacific.com for 2010.

Year	Award	Work	Role	Category	Result	Ref.
2004	Logie Awards	Home and Away	Tasha Andrews	Most Popular New Female Talent	Won	
2009	Scream Awards	Transformers: Revenge of the Fallen	Alice	Best Breakout Performance Female	Won	
2010	MTV Movie & TV Awards	Transformers: Revenge of the Fallen	Alice	Best WTF Moment	Nominated	
2011	Young Hollywood Awards	Immortals	Athena	Female Star of Tomorrow	Won	[57]

== Bibliography ==
=== Contributor ===
- Lucas, Isabel (2007). "Contributor". Laugh Even Louder!. By Camp Quality. Gosford, New South Wales: Scholastic Australia Pty Limited. ISBN 978-1-74169-022-4.
