= Caught Inside (film) =

- Directed by: Adam Blaiklock
- Written by: Joe Velikovsky; Matt Tomaszewski; Adam Blaiklock
- Produced by: Paul S. Freidman
- Starring: Ben Oxenbould; Daisy Betts; Harry Cook (actor); Peter Phelps
- Cinematography: Damian Wyvill ACS
- Release date: 10 March 2010
- Running time: 104 minutes
- Country: Australia
- Language: English

Caught Inside is a 2010 Australian thriller directed by Adam Blaiklock and produced by Paul S. Friedmann. The film stars Ben Oxenbould, Daisy Betts, Harry Cook (actor), & Peter Phelps; Damien Wyvill as the cinematographer. Caught Inside was also produced under the names Locked In and The Hedonist.

== Premise ==
Surfing charters are meant to be a trip to paradise. With seven male surfers stuck on a boat, there is bound to be some friction, but when two of the boys are replaced at the last minute with two attractive girls, the heat is turned up. The one single girl on board, Sam, enjoys the attention. She soon has the boys all wrapped around her finger, as she challenges surf legend, Bull, who is the alpha male of the group. But Bull decides to make a forceful move on Sam. Archie's loyalty is torn between Bull and the group, as the others beat Bull and abandon him on an island, but soon the ever-determined Bull returns. It's soon a life-and-death struggle on board the yacht, as the five imprisoned friends – Archie, Sam, Toobs, Rob and Alex – must survive the fury of the psycho at the helm. When everything goes horribly wrong – their 'dream trip' turns into a nightmare battle of wits, love and survival.

== Cast ==
- Ben Oxenbould as Bull
- Daisy Betts as Sam
- Sam Lyndon as Rob
- Simon Lyndon as Toobs
- Peter Phelps as Skipper Joe
- Harry Cook as Archie Cox
- Leeanna Walsman as Alex

== Critical reception ==
The movie was praised by critics, holding an 86% fresh rating from Rotten Tomatoes.
