= Chasing Comets =

2018 film

- Directed by: Jason Perini
- Screenplay by: Jason Stevens
- Produced by: Sarah Holmes; Jon Mak; Naomi Mitchell; Jason Perini; Paul Rudolph; Jason Stevens; Rebecca Stevens; David Thacker
- Starring: Dan Ewing; Isabel Lucas
- Cinematography: Adam Howden
- Edited by: Scott Walmsley
- Release date: 23 August 2018
- Running time: 100 minutes
- Country: Australia
- Language: English

Chasing Comets is a 2018 Australian Christian comedy drama film based on the life of NRL player Jason Stevens, who also wrote the screenplay. Filmed on location in Wagga Wagga, it was directed by Jason Perini and stars Dan Ewing and Isabel Lucas. The film advocates for the practice of abstinence from sex before marriage.

== Plot ==
Chase (Dan Ewing) is an aspiring rugby league player for the NRL Team who experiences several life changing moments whilst in a relationship with girlfriend Brooke (Isabel Lucas). He decides to pursue his dream in remembrance of his dad. Along the way, Chase discovers that his teammates Munsey (John Batchelor), Rhys Stewart (Stan Walker), Tom (Beau Ryan), and Rev (George Houvardas) want him to achieve his goals as the pressures of the game's first league match is just weeks away. However, he struggles to keep up resulting in Brooke dumping him and the team dropping him off the team's charts. Chase begins to embrace Christianity and attend a local church, and publicly announces that he is now abstaining from sex. He also begins a relationship with the pastor's daughter, who he does not have sex with until they marry.

== Cast ==
- Dan Ewing as Chase
- Isabel Lucas as Brooke
- George Houvardas as The Rev
- John Batchelor as Coach Munsey
- Stan Walker as Rhys Stewart
- Kat Hoyos as Dee
- Beau Ryan as Tom
- Rhys Muldoon as Warren Low
- Justin Melvey as Sam Low
- DJ Havana Brown as herself - DJ
- Katrina Risteska as April
- Lance Bonza as Rusty
- Deborah Galanos as Mary
- Brenton Parkes as Actor
- Tony Chu as Kin
- Gary Eck as Kev Mcosker
- Courtney Powell as Supporter
- Sarah Furnari as Estelle
- David Thacker as himself - Host
- Ash Meeraiya as Comet
- Daniel Needs as Comets Player #2
- Richard Somerton as Comets Player #3
- Jason Stevens as NRL Scout (Cowboys)
- Matthew Mannes as Comets Assistant Coach

== Production and release ==
It was filmed in Sydney and Wagga Wagga. Production completed in 2017. The film is scheduled to release on 23 August 2018, to Australian and New Zealand theatres.
