= A Heartbeat Away =

- Directed by: Gale Edwards
- Written by: Julie Kincaide
- Produced by: Chris Fitchett
- Starring: William Zappa; Isabel Lucas; Sebastian Gregory; Tammy McIntosh; Mark Furze
- Edited by: Matt Villa
- Music by: Guy Gross
- Production company: Pictures in Paradise
- Distributed by: Hoyts
- Release date: 2011
- Country: Australia
- Language: English
- Budget: $7 million
- Box office: $118,658

A Heartbeat Away is a 2011 Australian musical comedy film about a marching band in a small town.

== Plot ==
A young man with high aspirations as a musician steps up to become the musical director of the local marching band after his father is hurt in a vehicle accident. He has four weeks to drill the band before a major competition.

== Cast ==
- Sebastian Gregory as Kevin Flack
- Isabel Lucas as Mandy Riddick
- William Zappa as Edwin Flack
- Tammy Macintosh as Grace Flack
- Colin Friels as Mayor Riddick
- Roy Billing as George
- Kerry Walker as Dawn
- Terry Camilleri as Gino
- Errol O'Neill as Derek
- Tiffany Lamb as Tracy
- John O'May as Desmond Fyfe
- Mark Furze as Damian

== Production ==
Filming started in March 2010. The film was financed by Screen Australia, Screen Queensland, Cutting Edge Pty Ltd and Quickfire Films (UK).

== Reception ==
The film was a box office disappointment, widely considered a commercial and critical flop. During its opening weekend it took $44,204 across 77 screens, giving it a screen average of just $574.

On the review aggregator website Rotten Tomatoes, 0% of 12 critics' reviews are positive.

On Special Broadcasting Service (SBS), Craig Mathieson wrote in the conclusion of his review that the film "fails on nearly every count, appearing destined for a long half life in the Bad Movies We Love stakes." For The Age, Jim Schembri highlighted in his review that "the last thing the local film industry needs is a bad film like this."
