= Geena Davis =

American actor (born 1956)

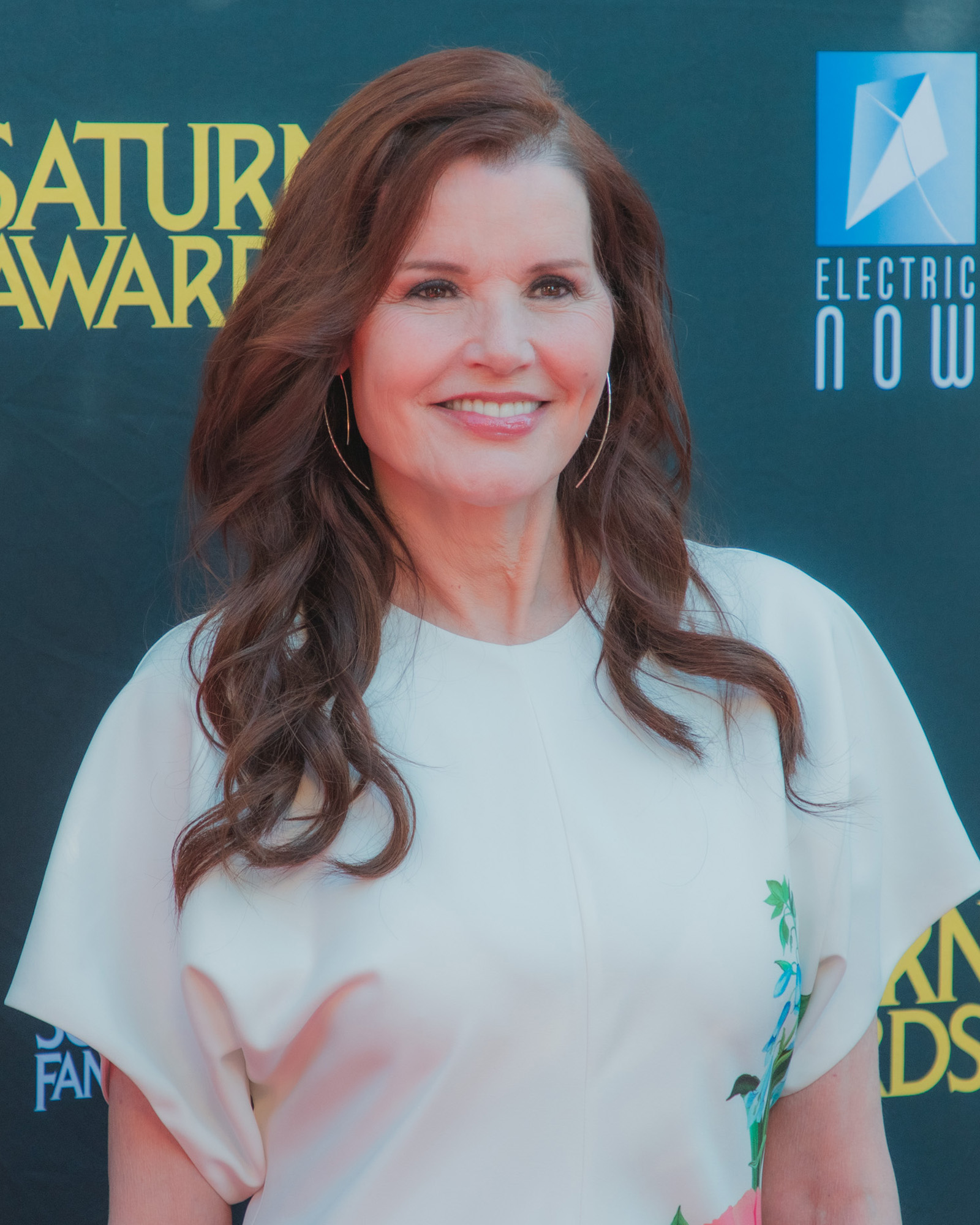
- Davis in 2026
- Born: Virginia Elizabeth Davis; January 21, 1956 (age 70); Wareham, Massachusetts, U.S.
- Occupation: Actor
- Years active: 1982–present
- Organization: Geena Davis Institute
- Spouses: Richard Emmolo (m. 1981; div. 1984); Jeff Goldblum (m. 1987; div. 1991); Renny Harlin (m. 1993; div. 1998); Reza Jarrahy (m. 2001; div. 2021)
- Children: 3

Virginia Elizabeth "Geena" Davis (born January 21, 1956) is an American actor. (Note: Davis has expressed a preference for being referred to by the gender-neutral term "actor" rather than by "actress".) She is the recipient of various accolades, including an Academy Award and a Golden Globe Award.

Davis made her acting debut in Tootsie (1982), a satirical romantic comedy, and starred in the science-fiction horror The Fly (1986), one of her first box office hits. While the fantasy comedy Beetlejuice (1988) brought her to prominence, the romantic drama The Accidental Tourist (1988) earned her the Academy Award for Best Supporting Actress. She established herself as a leading lady with the road film Thelma & Louise (1991), for which she received a nomination for the Academy Award for Best Actress, and the sports film A League of Their Own (1992), garnering a Golden Globe Award nomination. However, Davis' role in the box office failure Cutthroat Island (1995), directed by her husband, Renny Harlin, preceded a lengthy break and downturn in her film career.

Davis starred as the adoptive mother of the title character in the Stuart Little franchise (1999–2005) and as the first female president of the United States in the television series Commander in Chief (2005–2006), winning the Golden Globe Award for Best Actress – Television Series Drama for her role in the latter. Her later films include Accidents Happen (2009) and Marjorie Prime (2017). She has portrayed the recurring role of Dr. Nicole Herman in Grey's Anatomy (2014–2015, 2018) and that of Regan MacNeil/Angela Rance in the first season of the horror television series The Exorcist (2016). In 2026, she starred in the Netflix sci-fi series The Boroughs.

In 2004, Davis launched the Geena Davis Institute on Gender in Media (now the Geena Davis Institute), which works collaboratively with the entertainment industry to increase the presence of female characters in media. Through the organization, she launched the annual Bentonville Film Festival in 2015, and executive produced the documentary This Changes Everything in 2018. Davis herself received the film academy's Jean Hersholt Humanitarian Award in 2019 and her institute received the television academy's Governors Award Emmy in 2022.

== Early life and education ==
Virginia Elizabeth Davis was born on January 21, 1956 in Wareham, Massachusetts. Her mother, Lucille (née Cook) (1919–2001), was a teacher's assistant and her father, William F. Davis (1913–2009), was a civil engineer and church deacon. Both were from small towns in Vermont. She has an older brother, Danforth ("Dan").

Davis became interested in music at an early age. She learned piano and flute and played organ well enough as a teenager to be the organist at her Congregational church in Wareham. She was also a cheerleader and was cheer captain her senior year of high school. She attended Wareham High School in the city and was an exchange student in Sandviken, Sweden, where she became fluent in Swedish and got engaged to classmate Mats Dahlsköld, with whom she still corresponds by letter. She wanted to study acting at Boston University in Boston but missed the required audition during the year she was in Sweden. Thus, she began her college education at New England College in Henniker, New Hampshire, before transferring to Boston University; she did not earn enough credits to graduate, having received an incomplete in at least one class and an F in movement class. Her first post-university work was as a model for window mannequins at Ann Taylor; she then signed with Zoli Agency, a modeling agency in Manhattan. She is a member of Mensa. In her 2022 memoir, she said that her brother came up with a nickname, Geena, shortly after her birth to differentiate her from her Aunt Virginia, who went by the nickname Ginny.

== Career ==
=== Rise to fame (1982–1987) ===
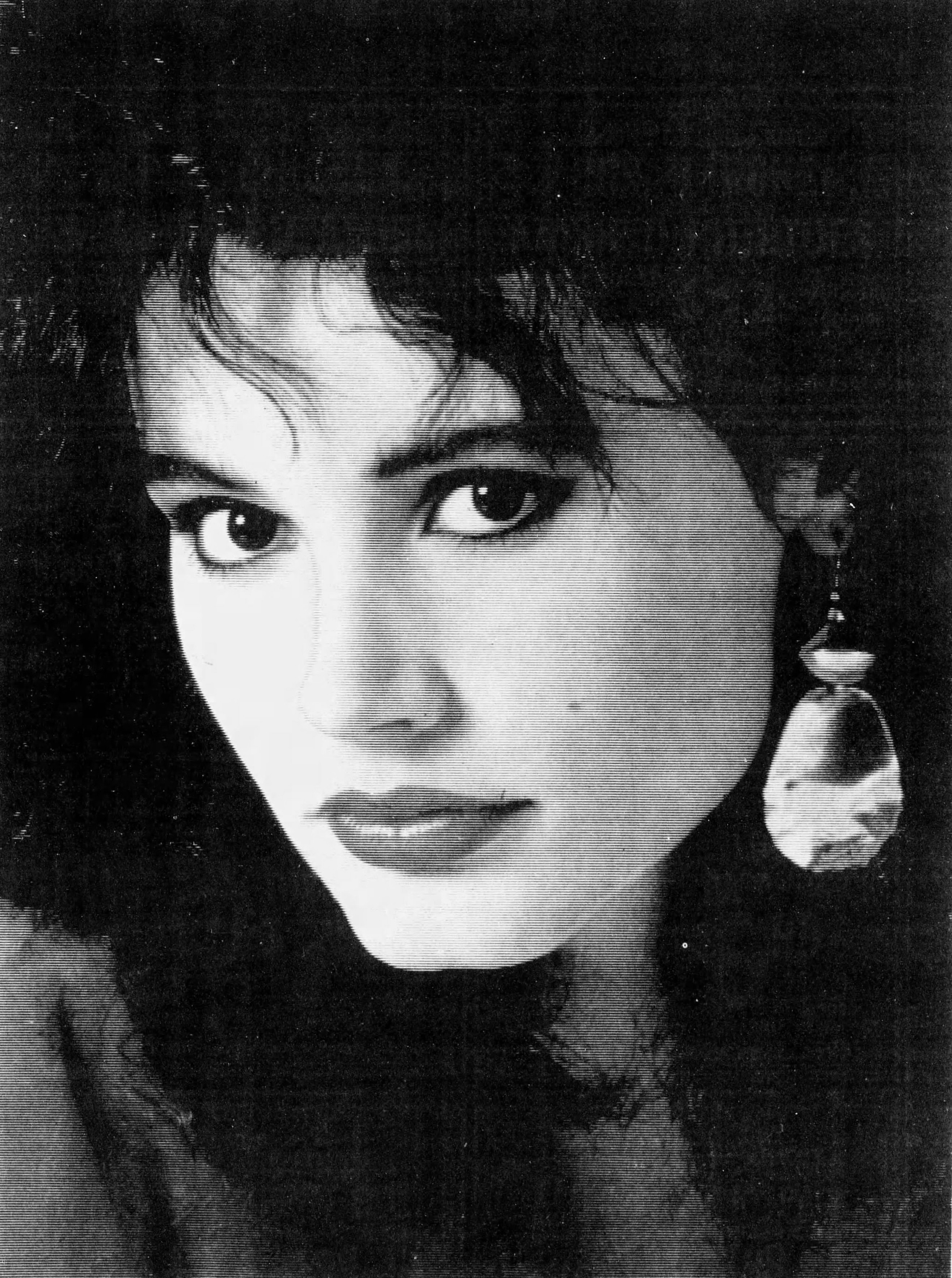
Davis appearing in the Southwest Daily News in 1983

Davis was working as a model when she was cast by director Sydney Pollack in his film Tootsie (1982) as a soap opera actor. She said the character is "someone who's going to be in their underwear a lot of time". It was the second most profitable film of 1982, received 10 Academy Awards nominations, and is considered to be a classic. She landed the role of Wendy Killian in the television series Buffalo Bill, which aired from June 1983 to March 1984 on NBC; she had a writing credit in an episode. Despite the series receiving 11 Emmy Awards nominations, it had lukewarm ratings and was canceled after two seasons. Davis guest-starred concurrently in Knight Rider, Riptide, Family Ties and Remington Steele, and followed with a series of her own, Sara, which lasted 13 episodes. During that time, she auditioned for the 1984 science fiction/action film The Terminator, reading for the lead role of Sarah Connor, which eventually went to Linda Hamilton. In Fletch (1985), an action comedy, she appeared with Chevy Chase as the colleague of a Los Angeles Times undercover reporter trying to expose drug trafficking on the beaches of Los Angeles. She also starred in the horror comedy Transylvania 6-5000 as a nymphomaniac vampire alongside future husband Jeff Goldblum. They also starred in the sci-fi thriller The Fly (1986), loosely based on George Langelaan's 1957 short story of the same name, where Davis portrayed a science journalist and an eccentric scientist's love interest. It was a commercial success and helped establish her as an actor. In 1987, she appeared with Goldblum again in the offbeat comedy Earth Girls Are Easy.

=== Recognition and praise (1988–1993) ===
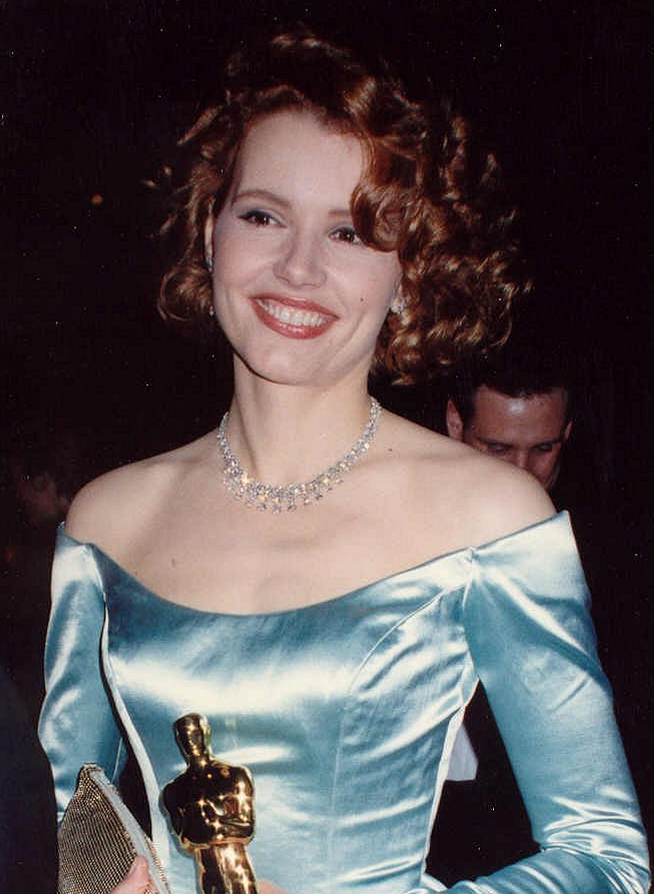
Davis at the 61st Academy Awards in 1989

Director Tim Burton cast Davis in his horror comedy Beetlejuice (1988) as one of a recently deceased young couple who become ghosts haunting their former house; it also starred Alec Baldwin, Michael Keaton and Winona Ryder. It made $73.7 million from a budget of $15 million, and Davis's performance and the overall film received mostly positive reviews.

Davis took on the role of an animal hospital employee and dog trainer with a sickly son in the romantic drama The Accidental Tourist (1988), alongside William Hurt and Kathleen Turner. Critic Roger Ebert, who gave the film four stars out of four, wrote: "Davis, as Muriel, brings an unforced wackiness to her role in scenes like the one where she belts out a song while she's doing the dishes. But she is not as simple as she sometimes seems [...]". The film emerged as a critical and commercial success, and Davis' performance earned her the Academy Award for Best Supporting Actress.

Davis appeared as the girlfriend of a man who, dressed as a clown, robs a bank in midtown Manhattan, in the comedy Quick Change (1990). Based on a book of the same name by Jay Cronley, it is a remake of the 1985 French film Hold-Up starring Jean-Paul Belmondo. Despite modest box office returns, the Chicago Tribune found the lead actors "funny and creative while keeping their characters life-size". Davis next starred with Susan Sarandon in Ridley Scott's road film Thelma & Louise (1991), as friends who embark on a road trip with unforeseen consequences. A critical and commercial success, it is considered a classic, as it influenced other films and artistic works and became a landmark feminist film. Davis' performance in the film earned her nominations for the Academy Award for Best Actress, the BAFTA Award for Best Actress in a Leading Role and the Golden Globe Award for Best Actress in a Motion Picture – Drama. It also featured Brad Pitt in his breakout role as a drifter; in his 2020 Oscar acceptance speech for Best Supporting Actor, Pitt thanked director Ridley Scott and Davis for "giving me my first shot."

In 1992, Davis starred alongside Madonna and Tom Hanks in the sports comedy-drama A League of Their Own as a baseball player on an all-women's team. It was number one at the box office, became the 10th highest-grossing film of the year in North America, and earned Davis her first nomination for the Golden Globe Award for Best Actress in a Motion Picture – Musical or Comedy. She played a television reporter in the comedy Hero (also 1992) alongside Dustin Hoffman and Andy Garcia. Although it flopped at the box office, Roger Ebert felt Davis was "bright and convincing as the reporter (her best line, after surviving the plane crash, is shouted through an ambulance door: "This is my story! I did the research!")".

=== Downturn, a hiatus, and television roles (1994–2009) ===
In 1994's Angie, Davis played an office worker who lives in the Bensonhurst section of Brooklyn and dreams of a better life. The film received mixed reviews from critics, despite much praise for Davis, and was a commercial failure. In her other 1994 release, the romantic comedy Speechless, Davis reunited with Keaton to play insomniac writers who fall in love until they realize that both are writing speeches for rival candidates in a New Mexico election. Despite negative reviews and modest box office returns, she earned her second nomination for the Golden Globe Award for Best Actress in a Motion Picture – Musical or Comedy for her performance.

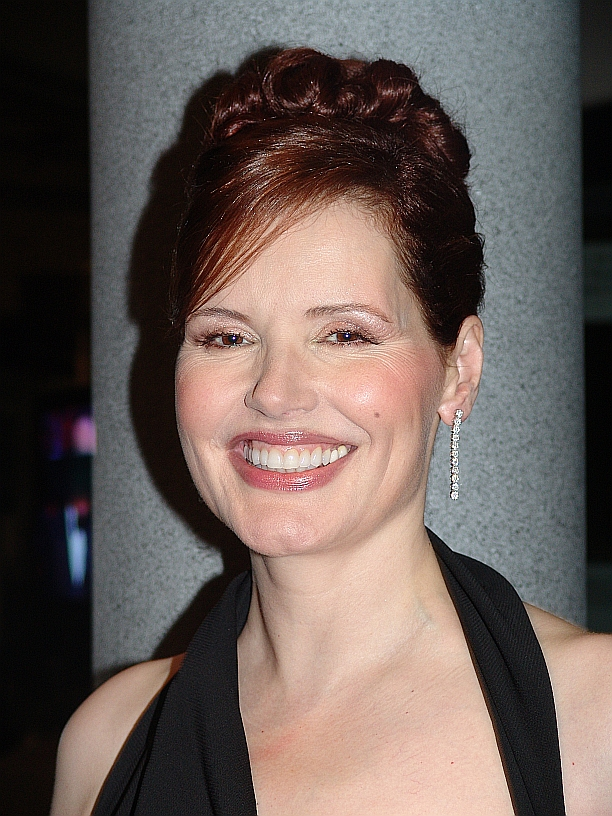
Davis at Ford's Theatre in Washington, D.C. in 2004

Davis teamed up with her then-husband, director Renny Harlin, for the films Cutthroat Island (1995) and The Long Kiss Goodnight (1996), with Harlin hoping that they would turn her into an action star. The Long Kiss Goodnight managed to become a moderate success, but Cutthroat Island flopped, received unfavorable reviews, and was listed as the "largest box office loss" by Guinness World Records. It is considered to be a contributing factor in the demise of Davis as a bankable star. By the mid and late 1990s, Davis' film career had become less noteworthy as she divorced Harlin in 1998 and took an "unusually long" two years off to reflect on her career, according to The New York Times. In a 2016 interview with Vulture, she recalled: "Film roles really did start to dry up when I got into my 40s. If you look at IMDb, up until that age, I made roughly one film a year. In my entire 40s, I made one movie, Stuart Little. I was getting offers, but for nothing meaty or interesting like in my 30s. I'd been completely ruined and spoiled. I mean, I got to play a pirate captain! I got to do every type of role, even if the movie failed." Davis was in talks to play Queen Beryl in a live-action adaption of Sailor Moon in 1997, produced by Disney, but the project was scrapped very early on. She appeared as Eleanor Little in the well-received family comedy Stuart Little (1999), a role she reprised in Stuart Little 2 (2002) and again in Stuart Little 3: Call of the Wild (2005).

Davis starred in the sitcom The Geena Davis Show, which aired for a season on ABC. She portrayed the first female president of the United States in the ABC television series Commander in Chief. While the role garnered her a Golden Globe for Best Actress in a Drama Series in 2006, the series was canceled after its first season; Davis admitted she was "devastated" by its cancellation in a 2016 interview. "I still haven't gotten over it. I really wanted it to work. It was on Tuesday nights opposite House, which wasn't ideal. But we were the best new show that fall. Then, in January, we were opposite American Idol. They said, 'The ratings are going to suffer, so we should take you off the air for the entire run of Idol, and bring it back in May. I put a lot of time and effort into getting it on another network, too, but it didn't work". Her performance in the series earned her the Golden Globe Award for Best Actress – Television Series Drama, in addition to nominations for the Primetime Emmy Award for Outstanding Lead Actress in a Drama Series and the Screen Actors Guild Award for Outstanding Performance by a Female Actor in a Drama Series. She was awarded the 2006 Women in Film Lucy Award.

Davis was the only American actor to be cast in the Australian film Accidents Happen (2009), portraying a foul-mouthed and strict mother. She said that it was the most fun she had ever had on a film set, and felt a deep friendship and connection to both of the actors who played her sons. Written by Brian Carbee and based on his own childhood and adolescence, the film received a limited theatrical release and mixed reviews from critics. Variety found it to be "led by a valiant Geena Davis", despite a "script that mistakes abuse for wit".

=== Professional expansion (2010–present) ===
After a long period of intermittent work, Davis often ventured into television acting and through her organization, the Geena Davis Institute on Gender in Media, her career expanded during the 2010s. In 2012, she starred as a psychiatrist in Coma, a miniseries based on the 1977 novel Coma by Robin Cook and the subsequent 1978 film. She played a powerful female movie executive in the comedy In a World... (2013), the directorial debut of Lake Bell. Bell found her only dialogue to be her favorite in the film and called it her "soapbox moment".

In 2014, Davis provided her voice for the English version of the Studio Ghibli animated film When Marnie Was There, as she was drawn to the film's abundant stories and strong use of female characters. She played the recurring role of Dr. Nicole Herman, an attending fetal surgeon with a life-threatening brain tumor, during the 11th season of Grey's Anatomy (2014–2015). In 2015, Davis launched an annual film festival to be held in Bentonville, Arkansas, to highlight diversity in film, accepting films that prominently feature minorities and women in the cast and crew. The first Bentonville Film Festival took place from May 5–9, 2015. Davis appeared as the mother of a semi-famous television star in the comedy Me Him Her (2016).

Davis has been a frequent guest narrator at Disney's Candlelight Processional, appearing at Disneyland in 2015 and Disney World in 2011, 2012, and 2019.

In the television series The Exorcist (2016), based on the 1973 film of the same name, Davis took on the role of grown-up Regan MacNeil, who has renamed herself Angela Rance to find peace and anonymity from her ordeal as a child. The Exorcist was a success with critics and audiences. In 2017, Davis starred in the film adaptation Marjorie Prime, alongside Jon Hamm, playing the daughter of an 85-year old experiencing the first symptoms of Alzheimer's disease, and appeared as the imaginary god of a heavyset 13-year-old girl in the comedy Don't Talk to Irene. Vanity Fair wrote that she stole "every scene" in Marjorie Prime, while Variety, on her role in Don't Talk to Irene, remarked: "There's no arguing the preternatural coolness of Geena Davis, a fact celebrated in self-conscious fashion by Don't Talk to Irene, a familiar type of coming-of-age film whose most distinguishing feature is the presence of the actress".

In 2018, Davis returned to Grey's Anatomy, reprising the role of Dr. Nicole Herman in the show's 14th season, and executive produced the documentary This Changes Everything, in which she was also interviewed about her experiences in the industry. The film premiered at the Toronto International Film Festival, where it was named first runner-up for the People's Choice Award: Documentaries. In 2019, she joined the voice cast of She-Ra and the Princesses of Power as Huntara, and executive produced CBS educational show Mission Unstoppable through her organization. The same year, she joined the cast of GLOW as Sandy Devereaux St. Clair, a former showgirl turned entertainment director of the Fan-Tan Hotel and Casino. In 2022, Davis' likeness was used for the character of Poison Ivy in the DC Entertainment comic book series Batman '89, set between the events of Batman Returns (1992) and The Flash (2023).

Davis plays a major role in the Netflix science fiction television series, The Boroughs, produced by The Duffer Brothers, which premiered in May 2026. The Boroughs was cancelled in June 2026, due to its expensive production budget, allegedly putting each episode at higher than $10 million. Davis stars in the comedy film The Wrong Girls, which was released in August 2026. On June 10, 2026, it was announced that Davis had been cast in the action movie The Kellys, alongside Arnold Schwarzenegger and Liam Hemsworth.

In July 2026, it was announced that Davis had been cast in the lead role of a true crime drama series that HBO was developing, Dorothea, based on serial killer Dorothea Puente.

== Publications ==
In October 2022, HarperOne published Davis's Dying of Politeness: A Memoir of her journey from childhood conventional New England femininity and trauma to feminist "badassery", one role at a time, on screen and in the real world.

In 2025, Penguin Books published The Girl Who Was Too Big for the Page, a children's picture book written and illustrated by Davis.

== Personal life ==
=== Marriages and family ===
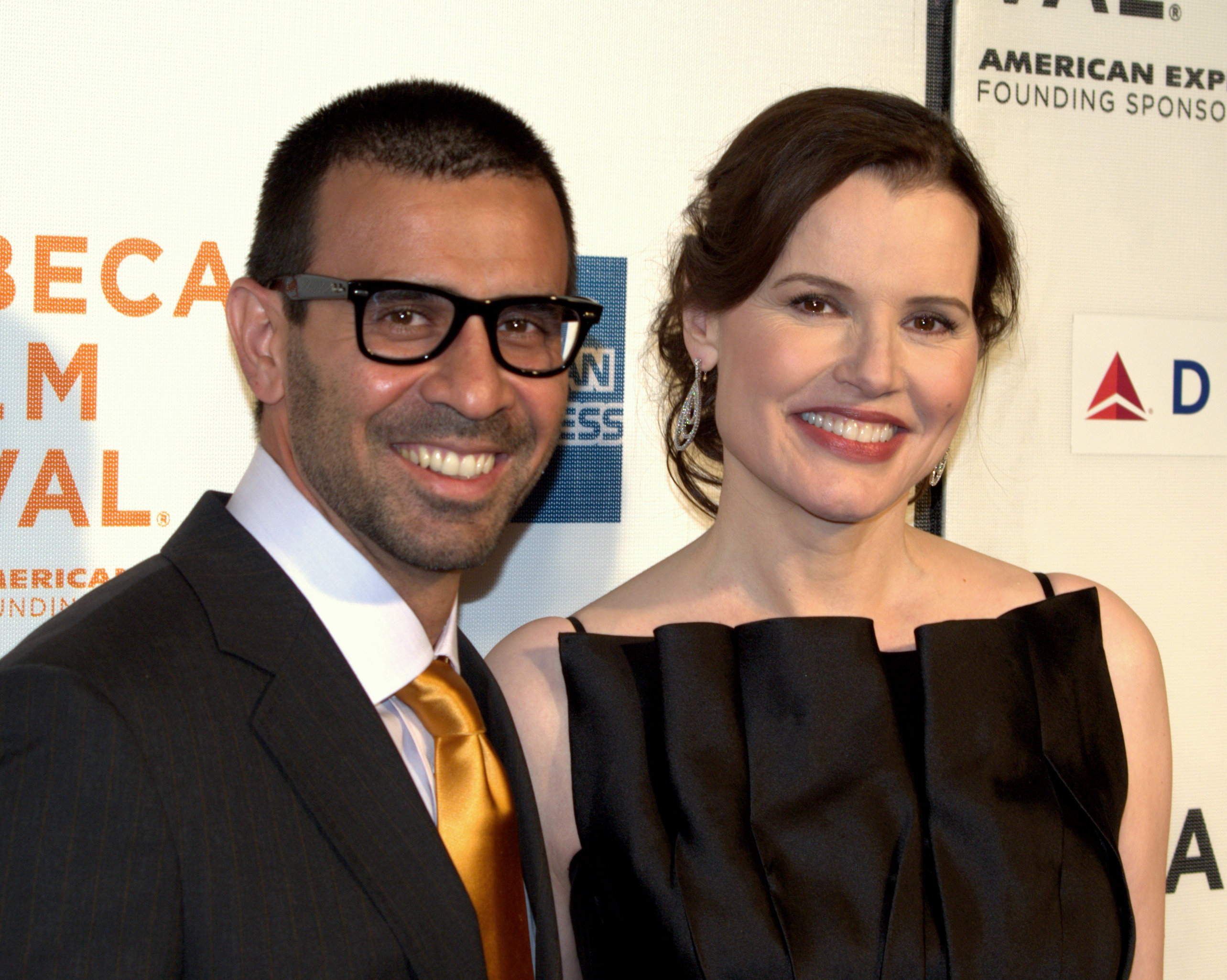
Davis and her ex husband Reza Jarrahy in 2009

Davis has been married and divorced four times. In December 1978, she began dating restaurateur Richard Emmolo and moved in with him a month later. They married on March 25, 1981, separated in February 1983, and divorced on June 27, 1984. She then dated future Thelma & Louise co-star Christopher McDonald, to whom she was briefly engaged.

In 1985, she met her second husband, actor Jeff Goldblum, on the set of Transylvania 6-5000. The couple married on November 1, 1987, and appeared together in two other films: The Fly and Earth Girls Are Easy. Davis filed for divorce in October 1990 and it was finalized in 1991. In 2022, Davis told People that her relationship with him "was a magical chapter in my life" and that she liked being wed to a fellow actor because he understood what she was going through and "was not in competition" with her.

Security expert Gavin de Becker was Davis' boyfriend during the early 1990s. She had a liaison with Brad Pitt around that time. After a five-month courtship, she and filmmaker Renny Harlin married on September 18, 1993. He directed her in Cutthroat Island and The Long Kiss Goodnight. Davis filed for divorce on August 26, 1997, a day after her personal assistant Tiffany Bowne gave birth to a son fathered by Harlin. The divorce became final in June 1998, with Davis being romanced by fitness trainer Keith Cubba in the interim.

In 1998, Davis began dating Iranian American Reza Jarrahy, a craniofacial plastic surgeon, and they allegedly married on September 1, 2001. They have three children: daughter Alizeh (born April 10, 2002) and fraternal twin sons Kaiis and Kian (born May 6, 2004). In May 2018, Jarrahy filed for divorce from Davis, listing their date of separation as November 15, 2017. Davis responded by filing a petition in which she claimed that she and Jarrahy were never legally married. Their divorce became final in December 2021. They agreed to change the last names of their two sons from "Davis-Jarrahy" to "Jarrahy".

=== Activism ===
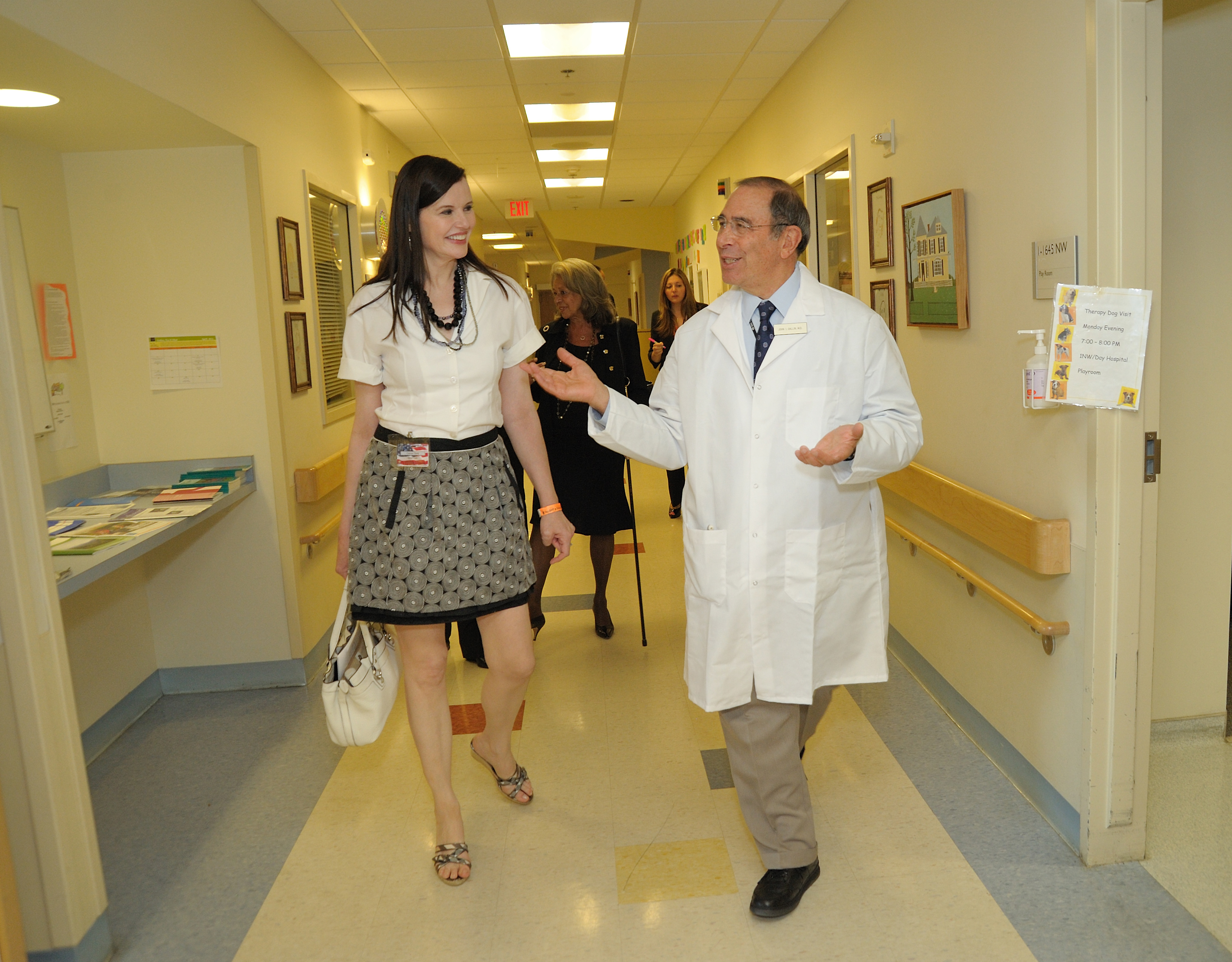
Davis in April 2011, meeting with John Gallin, a doctor at the National Institutes of Health in Bethesda, Maryland; they are discussing the Geena Davis Institute on Gender in Media

Davis is a supporter of the Women's Sports Foundation in New York City, and an advocate for Title IX, an Act of Congress focusing on equality in sports opportunities for girls and women.

In 2004, while watching children's television programs and videos with her daughter, Davis noticed an imbalance in the ratio of male to female characters. She went on to sponsor the largest-ever research project on gender in children's entertainment (resulting in four discrete studies, including one on children's television) at the Annenberg School for Communication at the University of Southern California. The study, directed by Stacy Smith, showed that there were nearly three male characters to every female one in the nearly 400 G, PG, PG-13, and R-rated movies analyzed. In 2005, Davis teamed up with the non-profit group Dads and Daughters to launch a venture dedicated to balancing the number of male and female characters in children's television and movie programming.

Davis launched the Geena Davis Institute on Gender in Media in 2004. It works collaboratively with the entertainment industry to increase the presence of female characters in media aimed at children, and to reduce inequality in Hollywood and the stereotyping of females by the industry. For her work in the field she received an honorary Doctor of Fine Arts degree from Bates College in Lewiston, Maine, in May 2009; and an honorary Oscar, the Academy's Jean Hersholt Humanitarian Award, in 2019. In 2011, Davis became one of a few celebrities attached to USAID and Ad Council's FWD campaign, an awareness initiative tied to that year's East Africa drought. She joined Uma Thurman, Chanel Iman, and Josh Hartnett in television and internet ads to "forward the facts" about the crisis.

=== Athletics ===
In July 1999, Davis was one of 300 women who vied for a semifinals berth with the U.S. Olympic archery team to participate in the Sydney 2000 Summer Olympics. She placed 24th and did not qualify for the team, but participated as a wild-card entry in the Sydney International Golden Arrow competition. In August 1999, she said that she was not an athlete growing up and that she entered archery in 1997, two years before the tryouts.

== Filmography ==
Key
†	Denotes works that have not yet been released

=== Film ===
Year	Title	Role	Notes
1982	Tootsie	April Page	
1985	Fletch	Larry	
1985	Transylvania 6-5000	Odette Balu	
1986	The Fly	Veronica "Ronnie" Quaife	
1988	Beetlejuice	Barbara Maitland	
1988	Earth Girls Are Easy	Valerie Gail	
1988	The Accidental Tourist	Muriel Pritchett	
1990	Quick Change	Phyllis Potter	
1991	Thelma & Louise	Thelma Dickinson	
1992	A League of Their Own	Dorothy "Dottie" Hinson	
1992	Hero	Gale Gayley	
1994	Angie	Angie Scacciapensieri	
1994	Speechless	Julia Mann	Also producer
1995	Cutthroat Island	Morgan Adams	
1996	The Long Kiss Goodnight	Samantha Caine / Charlene "Charly" Baltimore	
1999	Stuart Little	Mrs. Eleanor Little	
2002	Stuart Little 2	Mrs. Eleanor Little	
2006	Stuart Little 3: Call of the Wild	Mrs. Eleanor Little	Voice; direct-to-video
2009	Accidents Happen	Gloria Conway	
2013	In a World...	Katherine Huling	
2014	When Marnie Was There	Yoriko Sasaki	Voice; English dub
2016	Me Him Her	Mrs. Ehrlick	
2017	Marjorie Prime	Tess Prime	
2017	Don't Talk to Irene	Herself	
2018	This Changes Everything	Herself	Documentary; also executive producer
2020	Ava	Bobbi Faulkner	
2023	Fairyland	Munca	
2024	Blink Twice	Stacy	
2026	The Wrong Girls	Dr. Chapman	
TBA	The Kellys †	TBA	Filming
TBA	This Changes Everything †	TBA	Post-production; Documentary

=== Television ===
Year	Title	Role	Notes
1983	Knight Rider	Grace Fallon	Episode: "K.I.T.T. the Cat"
1983–1984	Buffalo Bill	Wendy Killian	26 episodes
1984	Fantasy Island	Patricia Grayson	Episode: "Don Juan's Lost Affair"
1984	Riptide	Dr. Melba Bozinsky	Episode: "Raiders of the Lost Sub"
1984	Family Ties	Karen Nicholson	2 episodes
1985	Sara	Sara McKenna	13 episodes
1985	Secret Weapons	Tamara Reshevsky / Brenda	Television film
1985	Remington Steele	Sandy Dalrymple	Episode: "Steele in the Chips"
1985	George Burns Comedy Week	Angelica / Sandi	Episode: "Dream, Dream, Dream"
1989	Saturday Night Live	Herself	Host; episode: "Geena Davis/John Mellencamp"
1989	Trying Times	Daphne	Episode: "The Hit List"
1990	The Earth Day Special	Kim	Television special
2000–2001	The Geena Davis Show	Teddie Cochran	22 episodes
2004	Will & Grace	Janet Adler	Episode: "The Accidental Tsuris"
2005–2006	Commander in Chief	President Mackenzie Allen	18 episodes
2009	Exit 19	Gloria Woods	Television pilot
2012	Coma	Dr. Agnetta Lindquist	Miniseries
2013	Untitled Bounty Hunter Project	Mackenzie Ryan	Television pilot
2013	Doc McStuffins	Princess Persephone	Voice; episode: "Sir Kirby and the Plucky Princess"
2014–2018	Grey's Anatomy	Dr. Nicole Herman	13 episodes
2015	Annedroids	Student	Episode: "Undercover Pigeon"
2016	The Exorcist	Angela Rance / Regan MacNeil	10 episodes
2019	She-Ra and the Princesses of Power	Huntara	Voice; 3 episodes
2019	GLOW	Sandy Devereaux St. Clair	6 episodes
2019–2022	Mission Unstoppable	—N/a	Executive producer
2026	The Boroughs	Renee Joyce	Main role

=== Music videos ===
Music video work by Geena Davis
Year	Song	Artist	Notes
1986	"Help Me"	Bryan Ferry	Footage from The Fly
1988	"The Ground You Walk On"	Geena Davis	Footage from Earth Girls Are Easy
1991	"Part of Me, Part of You"	Glenn Frey	Footage from Thelma & Louise
1992	"This Used to Be My Playground"	Madonna	Footage from A League of Their Own
1992	"Now and Forever"	Carole King	Footage from A League of Their Own
1996	"F.N.T."	Semisonic	Footage from The Long Kiss Goodnight
1999	"You're Where I Belong"	Trisha Yearwood	Footage from Stuart Little
1999	"I Need to Know"	R Angels	Footage from Stuart Little
2002	"I'm Alive"	Celine Dion	Footage from Stuart Little 2

== Awards and nominations ==
Association	Year	Category	Work	Result	Ref(s)
Academy Awards	1989	Best Supporting Actress	The Accidental Tourist	Won	
Academy Awards	1991	Best Actress	Thelma & Louise	Nominated	
Academy Awards	2020	Jean Hersholt Humanitarian Award	—N/a	Honored	
American Comedy Awards	1992	Funniest Leading Actress in a Motion Picture	Thelma & Louise	Nominated	
Artios Awards	2020	Lynn Stalmaster Award	—N/a	Honored	
Boston Society of Film Critics Awards	1991	Best Actress	Thelma & Louise	Won	
British Academy Film Awards	1992	Best Actress in a Leading Role	Thelma & Louise	Nominated	
Cannes Film Festival	2016	Women in Motion Award	—N/a	Honored	
Chicago Film Critics Association Awards	1992	Best Actress	Thelma & Louise	Nominated	
Coronado Island Film Festival	2022	Legacy Award	—N/a	Honored	
David di Donatello Awards	1992	Best Foreign Actress (Note: Shared with Susan Sarandon)	Thelma & Louise	Won	
Daytime Emmy Awards	2020	Outstanding Educational or Informational Series	Mission Unstoppable	Nominated	
Deauville American Film Festival	2019	Deauville Talent Award	—N/a	Honored	
Fangoria Chainsaw Awards	2017	Best TV Actress	The Exorcist	Nominated	
Golden Globe Awards	1992	Best Actress in a Motion Picture – Drama	Thelma & Louise	Nominated	
Golden Globe Awards	1993	Best Actress in a Motion Picture – Musical or Comedy	A League of Their Own	Nominated	
Golden Globe Awards	1995	Best Actress in a Motion Picture – Musical or Comedy	Speechless	Nominated	
Golden Globe Awards	2006	Best Actress in a Television Series – Drama	Commander in Chief	Won	
Los Angeles Film Critics Association Awards	1991	Best Actress	Thelma & Louise	Runner-up	
MTV Movie & TV Awards	1992	Best Female Performance	Thelma & Louise	Nominated	
MTV Movie & TV Awards	1992	Best On-Screen Duo	Thelma & Louise	Nominated	
MTV Movie & TV Awards	1993	Best Female Performance	A League of Their Own	Nominated	
National Board of Review Awards	1991	Best Actress	Thelma & Louise	Won	
New York Film Critics Circle Awards	1992	Best Actress	Thelma & Louise	Runner-up	
Primetime Emmy Awards	2006	Outstanding Lead Actress in a Drama Series	Commander in Chief	Nominated	
Primetime Emmy Awards	2022	Governors Award (Note: Credited to the Geena Davis Institute, not Davis herself)	—N/a	Honored	
San Diego Film Festival	2015	Humanitarian Award	—N/a	Honored	
San Francisco International Film Festival	1992	Piper-Heidsieck Award	—N/a	Honored	
Sarasota Film Festival	2011	Impact Award	—N/a	Honored	
Satellite Awards	2005	Best Actress in a Television Series – Drama	Commander in Chief	Nominated	
Saturn Awards	1987	Best Actress	The Fly	Nominated	
Saturn Awards	1997	Best Actress	The Long Kiss Goodnight	Nominated	
Saturn Awards	2000	Best Supporting Actress	Stuart Little	Nominated	
Screen Actors Guild Awards	2006	Outstanding Performance by a Female Actor in a Drama Series	Commander in Chief	Nominated	
Women in Film Lucy Awards	2006	Lucy Award	—N/a	Honored	
