= Anthony Anderson (producer) =

Australian producer, lawyer, meditation teacher, & transformational facilitator

- Born: Anthony Anderson; Australia
- Occupation: Producer
- Years active: 1996–present

Anthony Anderson is an Australian film and television producer, a former lawyer, meditation teacher and a transformational facilitator.

== Early career ==
Anthony Anderson studied at the University of Sydney and graduated with a Bachelor of Arts and a Bachelor of Law. He established a career as an entertainment lawyer working at Owen Trembath & Associates in Sydney, with subsequent work at Columbia Tri Star and Shanahan Management. At the peak of the HIV/AIDS epidemic in Australia, he helped establish and was the founding chairman of the HIV/AIDS Legal Centre, a volunteer-supported community legal centre in Sydney.

== Producer ==
=== Film ===
Anthony established film production company Red Carpet Productions in 1996 to develop independent films. He produced the short dramas Pentuphouse (1998) and Flowergirl (1999) with director Cate Shortland, and executive produced Joy (2000). He was also associate producer on Strap On Olympia (1995) and The Visitor (2001).

He is the producer of feature film Somersault (film) (2004) which had its world premiere at the Cannes Film Festival – Un Certain Regard. It received 13 Australian Film Institute Awards, the most to date of any film, winning each possible category. Red Carpet Productions also released an award-winning soundtrack album from the film with band/composers Decoder Ring.

Anthony Anderson is the producer of Accidents Happen (2009) which had its world premiere at the Tribeca Film Festival.

=== Television ===
In 2006 Anthony worked as Associate Producer on The Silence, an ABC television mini-series directed by Cate Shortland and produced by Jan Chapman.

=== Awards ===
In 2004 Anthony was awarded the Independent Producer of the Year Award by the Screen Producers Association of Australia. For the film Somersault, he received the Film Critics Circle of Australia award for Best Feature; the IF Award for Best Feature Film; and the Australian Film Institute award for Best Feature Film. In 2005 Anthony was recipient of a Fellowship from the Australian Film Commission.

In 2009 Anthony Anderson relocated to New York and develops film and television projects in both Australia and the USA.

== Facilitation ==
Alongside film producing, in 2006 Anthony began facilitating a meditation and personal mastery workshop called Lifting the Veil. In 2012 he joined Co-Creation Partners in North America as a freelance consultant, facilitating cultural transformation programs in large organizations in Europe and the USA.
