= New Moon (magazine) =

Magazine for and by girls

- July August 2012 cover
- Editor: Nancy Gruver
- Categories: Feminism; Youth
- Frequency: Quarterly
- Founded: 1992
- First issue: March 1993
- Country: United States, but is read by girls across the world
- Based in: Richmond, California
- Language: English
- Website: newmoongirls.com
- ISSN: 1943-488X

New Moon Girls is a magazine created and written by and for girls ages 8 to 14. The magazine was founded in Duluth, Minnesota, United States and is now published in Richmond, California, on a quarterly basis by New Moon Girl Media.

== Background ==
New Moon Girls was established in 1992 as New Moon: The Magazine for Girls and Their Dreams. The first issue of the magazine was published in March 1993. The magazine was started by Nancy Gruver, Joe Kelly and their daughters Mavis and Nia. The magazine consists of 48 pages and contains no advertisements. About 95 percent of the magazine's content is contributed by girls, and submissions from readers are encouraged. Magazine issues come in the mail four times a year. Yearly subscriptions are available worldwide and back issues are sold online.

Regular departments in the magazine include "Body & Mind," which explains the physical changes that happen during childhood and puberty; "Global Village," which introduces readers to girls from other countries; "Women's Work," which profiles a woman in an interesting profession; "Herstory," which introduces readers to little-known women from history; "Girls on the Go," which covers girls' activism and creations; and "Just For Fun," which contains DIY projects intended for trying at home. Other regular departments are "Ask a Girl", where girls give each other advice on problems, "Voice Box", where girls debate topics like allowances, "Luna's Art Gallery", art submissions from readers, and "Girl Caught", intended for improving girls' media literacy by identifying ads and products that they believe are respectful or disrespectful to girls and women.

The magazine's content is written primarily by girls ages 8 and up.
