= Persons Unknown (TV series) =

2010 drama television series

- Genre: Drama; Mystery; Psychological thriller
- Created by: Christopher McQuarrie
- Starring: Jason Wiles; Daisy Betts; Chadwick Boseman; Lola Glaudini; Tina Holmes; Kate Lang Johnson; Gerald Kyd; Kandyse McClure; Sean O'Bryan; Alan Ruck
- Opening theme: "Persons Unknown Main Title"
- Composer: Jeff Rona
- Countries of origin: United States; Mexico; Italy
- Original language: English
- No. of seasons: 1
- No. of episodes: 13

Production
- Executive producers: Dee D'Orazio; Christopher McQuarrie; Heather McQuarrie; Remi Aubuchon
- Producers: Mitch Engel; Lorenzo O'Brien; Andre Barren; Erendira de la Lama; Alberto Pando
- Production location: Mexico City, Mexico
- Cinematography: Jaime Reynoso
- Editors: Adrian Parisi; Raúl Dávalos; Michael Stern; Andres Riva Saft; Julius Ramsay
- Running time: 42 minutes
- Production companies: Invisible Ink; Televisa; Fox Television Studios

Original release
- Network: NBC (United States); Rai 2 (Italy)
- Release: June 7 – August 28, 2010

Persons Unknown is a psychological thriller television series created by Christopher McQuarrie and produced by Fox Television Studios. The series follows a group of strangers who wake up imprisoned inside a small ghost town with no memory of how they wound up there.

The thirteen-episode summer replacement on Monday, June 7, 2010, at 10:00 p.m. Episodes were moved, or dropped completely, in various markets, while NBC moved the series from Mondays to Saturdays at 8:00 p.m., starting with the July 17 (originally to run July 12) episode. The original run ended on August 28, 2010. It was also broadcast in other countries.

== Overview ==
Seven diverse strangers, Janet Cooper (Daisy Betts), Joe Tucker (Jason Wiles), Moira Doherty (Tina Holmes), Sergeant Graham McNair (Chadwick Boseman), Tori Fairchild (Kate Lang Johnson), Bill Blackham (Sean O'Bryan), and Charlie Morse (Alan Ruck) awaken in a hotel, in a mostly deserted town, with little to no knowledge of how they got there or where they are. The hotel and small 1950s-era town nearby are completely filled with cameras and microphones. Over the course of the following weeks, they are subjected to significant psychological and physical stress. Meanwhile, an investigative reporter begins to look into the disappearances of the missing people despite intimidation by those who apparently know their every move.

Joe is eventually revealed to be a member of "The Program." It is unclear who or what the Program is, or what their motives, resources, or support are. The only indication is that the Program is manipulating them, attempting to influence their behavior, thought patterns, and beliefs.

At the end of the season, despite staging a mass breakout by faking the deaths of everyone in the town except for Joe, all the participants are recaptured, and awaken in an identical hotel built into the hull of a container ship, where the original night manager welcomes them to "Level 2". Joe and Mark Renbe are seen waking in a second hotel, in which Tori Fairchild serves as the hotel manager. Kat Damatto and Ambassador Fairchild are last seen in cages at an undisclosed location.

== Cast ==
=== Abductees ===
- Joe Tucker (Jason Wiles), according to NBC.com, is the official leader of the group and is forceful and direct. He also knows military hand signals. Although he prefers to keep his personal life to himself, and never reveals what his occupation is or why he might have been taken, he claimed that he was in New York when he was abducted. Joe is also competing with Ericka for the heart of Janet. He claims to be deathly allergic to bee stings. Later in the series, it was revealed that Joe was a Roman Catholic priest before he was part of the Program.
- Janet Cooper (Daisy Betts) is a day-care owner from San Francisco. She is a single mother to a five-year-old girl, Megan Cooper. She was once married. However, her husband left in the middle of the night, abandoning his daughter and wife. Janet has a strained relationship with her mother whom she claims was abusive. Janet has hired investigators to find her husband.
- Sergeant Graham McNair (Chadwick Boseman) is a level-headed Marine. He is a devout Muslim at the beginning of the series, stating that he became devout due to the treatment of prisoners at a government facility that housed alleged terrorists. He also worked as a mercenary at one time with tragic results.
- Moira Doherty (Tina Holmes) was a mental patient at St. Mary's Hospital in Sandusky, Ohio. Moira is the most peaceful and kindly of the abducted people, but has a darker past. It is implied that she is a habitual liar. She serves as the doctor of the group.
- Tori Fairchild (Kate Lang Johnson) is a wealthy socialite. Her father is the American ambassador to Italy and former head of the CIA. The NBC website described her as "privileged, pragmatic, and manipulative". She woke up in the hotel having no knowledge of where she was because she thought she "partied too much". She believes her father has sent her to the location to punish her for tarnishing his political image. She implies that he exchanged promises of her sexual favors to important political figures.
- Erika Taylor (Kandyse McClure), according to NBC.com, is a tough as nails ex-con who sees everyone as her enemy even her fellow abductees. Erika has an eleven-year-old son named Anton and reveals that before arriving she was executed at the prison in which she was confined.
- Bill Blackham (Sean O'Bryan), according to NBC.com, is a slick opportunist whose first priority is himself. Blackham describes himself as a used-car salesman, and stated that the last thing he remembers before finding himself in the hotel was being pulled over by the police in a traffic stop. He is very mistrustful of those around him, but the other abductees are dismissive of him.
- Charlie Morse (Alan Ruck) is the CEO of a very successful investment firm. He is married and states that his wife is mentally unstable and emotionally, if not physically, dependent on him. According to NBC.com, he is "a fierce fighter who doesn't take kindly to being intimidated or threatened."

=== Other characters ===
- Mark Renbe (Gerald Kyd) is a journalist in San Francisco who is always on the lookout for scandal. He investigates the bizarre disappearance of his ex-wife Janet Cooper despite his boss believing that there is no story there.
- Kat Damatto (Lola Glaudini) is "a smart, sexy and hard-nosed editor at a muck-raking tabloid" in San Francisco. She is Mark Renbe's boss and lover. She is also fluent in Italian and Spanish.
- The Night Manager (Andy Greenfield) is the sole employee of the hotel in which the abductees awake. He first appears in their first evening in town. He represents himself as another pawn in the abductions but is later revealed to be part of the Program.
- Sam Edick (Michael Harney) is introduced as a private detective Janet Cooper hired to find her missing husband.
- Tom X (Reggie Lee) is introduced as the head of the staff at the Chinese restaurant in the town.
- Robert Gomez (Carlos Lacamara) is a police detective who continually communicates with Mark.
- Liam Ulrich (Alan Smyth) is the second-in command of "The Program". He first appears in Episode 8, "Saved".
- Ambassador Franklin Fairchild (James Read) has been a member of the program for 30 years. He is Tori Fairchild's father. Tori believes he is guilty of her mother's death. He appeared in six episodes.
- Helen (Joanna Lipari) has been the director of the program for 25 years. She has a twin sister, the deranged, Angela Barragan, that is visited by Kat and Mark to learn more information about the program

== Episodes ==
No.	Title	Directed by	Written by	Original release date	Prod. code	U.S. viewers (millions)
1	"Pilot"	Michael Rymer	Christopher McQuarrie	June 7, 2010	4002-08-101	4.29
A diverse group of seven strangers find themselves stranded in a deserted town with no idea how they got there. They are being watched by security cameras and find their first attempt to escape is effectively blocked. When the group has dinner at the Chinese restaurant, one of the residents finds an ominous message in a fortune cookie. Meanwhile in San Francisco, Renbe, a reporter, searches for clues on one of the missing women.
2	"The Edge"	Bill Eagles	Remi Aubuchon	June 14, 2010	4002-08-102	3.45
Moira removes the implants they believe prevent them from escaping. However they encounter another barrier keeping them in the town. The abductees split up to investigate the town, looking for anything to help them escape. Blackham and Morse join together to execute their own plan to escape the town. Meanwhile, Renbe's investigation into Janet's disappearance hits a dead end.
3	"The Way Through"	Bill Eagles	Sandy Isaac	June 21, 2010	4002-08-103	3.43
After spending a week attempting to dig a tunnel to escape the town, the abductees are blocked by a metal barrier which releases a poison gas. A helicopter hovers overhead and drops a box, in which they find three gas masks for the seven of them to use -- putting them all in fear of a gas attack. Various abductees are submitted to psychological warfare, which includes Blackham receiving information about Morse's relationship with his wife. Back in San Francisco, Renbe resumes his investigation into Janet's disappearance, bringing him into direct conflict with the private investigator, Edicks.
4	"Exit One"	Leon Ichaso	Michael R. Perry	June 28, 2010	4002-08-104	2.90
The group of abductees are rattled when the hotel's night manager informs them that someone will be "checking out". A taxi arrives later that day with instructions to pick up Janet and the guest of her choice; Janet selects Joe. Tori, convinced her father is responsible for her presence in the town, is devastated that the taxi was not sent for her and tries to find a way out -- which includes seducing the Night Manager. Meanwhile, Bill Blackham badgers Charlie Morse with his knowledge of Morse's secret, attempting to extort favors or money from Morse. The taxi gets a flat tire, then is destroyed by a truck. Janet and Joe, begin walking across the deserted countryside, taking shelter in a cabin when night falls -- which has some unpleasant occupants. Managing to safely leave the cabin, they continue wandering, only to end up back at the town. After their return, another taxi arrives for Tori.
5	"Incoming"	Jonathan Frakes	Linda McGibney	July 5, 2010	4002-08-105	2.96
The abductees are wondering where Tori has gone. Just as they are about to look around the town, they encounter an unconscious woman, named Erika, wearing Tori's clothes. She wakes up and attacks the others. While shopping for clothes, Moira sees a news report on television that says that Tori is safe with her father in Italy. Tori is actually dead and her father is trying to find out who is responsible. Later, while locked in a bank vault, Janet and Erika bond, talking about their lives and how they both happen to be mothers. McNair is haunted by his past and Moira becomes suspicious of Joe's behavior.
6	"The Truth"	Steve Shill	Sandy Isaac	July 17, 2010	4002-08-106	1.69
The abductees become suspicious of Joe due to the elevator's floor number not changing when he boards it by himself. He later doubles over in pain, and has apparently been poisoned. Erika suggests antifreeze as a poison matching the symptoms, and offers him vodka which would neutralize the antifreeze, but not until he admits to working with the kidnappers, which he does. Tom, another member of "The Program" is then seen watching the cameras, wondering aloud what they are now going to do with Joe, and then seeing Erika pouring antifreeze down the drain. Meanwhile, Mark and Kat are taken to Italy and attend Tori's funeral, surviving four near-death experiences in the process, and find that a Chinese restaurant is somehow related in the kidnappings.
7	"Smoke and Steel"	Rod Hardy	Michael R. Perry	July 24, 2010	4002-08-107	2.09
Joe confesses what he knows about the kidnappers and their organization to the others. But the information that he gives them are half-truths with other abductees frequently questioning his words, with Janet really being the only one that trusts him. Charlie tries to make a deal with Joe to get out of the town, but fails. Janet and Erika find personal files about them in Joe's room, but soon after, they learn that Tom was the one that planted the files there. After a small confrontation between Tom and Joe, Tom loses his edge and points a gun at Joe. Janet comes to save him, throwing oil on Tom, who is then engulfed in flames, dying as a result. Meanwhile, Kat, Renbe, and Stefano believe that Joe is the key to finding both Tori and Janet.
8	"Saved"	Bill Eagles	Linda McGibney	July 31, 2010	4002-08-108	1.60
After being taken from his room, Joe awakens to find himself in a room with wires attached to him, slipping in and out of consciousness. He flashes back to his past when he was once a priest before being captured by "The Program". Tori, who was believed to be dead, seems to be alive, nursing Joe and trying to convince him not to jeopardize "The Program" for his love of Janet. Meanwhile, Blackham feels left out by the others and talks directly to the cameras about wanting to leave. Moira has a hard time accepting McNair's dark past and begins to trust him less. Meanwhile, Kat and Renbe meet a delusional woman, the only person who escaped the program, who also was its director once.
9	"Static"	Michael Offer	Henry Robles	August 7, 2010	4002-08-109	1.26
After reprogramming, Joe reappears in town, but claims not to recognize anyone. It is soon discovered that he becomes extremely aggressive by anyone's touch, resulting in everyone but Janet wanting him eliminated, and in the Night Manager's death. Meanwhile, Kat and Renbe find themselves down and out in South America, eventually stumbling upon a familiar town.
10	"Identity"^{[†]}	Jonathan Frakes	Sandy Isaac	August 21, 2010	4002-08-110	1.30
Irishman Liam Ulrich replaces the fallen Night Manager and tells the abductees that they must stay in second floor due to security purposes. To keep them at ease, Ulrich leaves a little memento in their hotel rooms. Because of the mementos, Moira and McNair look back at their troubled childhoods, Charlie reads about his business life from a newspaper and Joe is given the old bible he had when he was a priest. Is also revealed that Erika's real name is Theresa Randolph. Meanwhile, Kat and Renbe are in what is believed to be a duplicate town created by "The Program" and see the men in the blue suits moving dead bodies to the bank vault. They discover all the bodies have severed thumbs, and are then startled by Stefano, who severed the thumbs himself to identify the bodies. As the episode ends, The madame director warns Ulrich not to be romantically involved with Janet, when he has already started giving her better treatment than the other abductees.
11	"Seven Sacrifices"^{[‡]}	Tim Matheson	Michael R. Perry	August 21, 2010 (NBC.com)	4002-08-111	Never aired
Ulrich begins to have the trust of Charlie, Blackham and most importantly Janet. Ulrich's love for Janet makes him give her a backstory on his life before being in "The Program", as well as giving her information on how "The Program" works. Janet begins to indulge in Ulrich's advances even though Joe and Erika give her warnings to stay away. Meanwhile, Renbe is sent to jail for the murder of Janet. Kat is fired from her job, evicted from her apartment and her bank accounts and credit cards are frozen due to planted stories about her dealing drugs. It is revealed that the old night manager survived his injuries from Joe and is now working with the madame director. She has made the decision to terminate everyone in the town, including Ulrich.
12	"And Then There Was One"^{[†]}	Jonathan Frakes	Linda McGibney	August 28, 2010	4002-08-112	2.97
The abductees find six body bags in the bank vault. They do the math and realize that six of them are going to die. Joe explains that they will kill each other off. Ulrich is later killed after trying to assist them to escape. Meanwhile, Renbe and Kat trace "The Program" to the Mansfield Institute, officially a scientific, educational, and charitable nonprofit group. When they travel to the Manfield Institute's headquarters and make a commotion, the madame director notes that no one has gotten so close to them before. Back in the town, the abductees start killing each other. When "The Program" believes that everyone but Joe is dead, they place them in body bags and ship them out of the town. Once safely out of the town, the killings are revealed to have been an elaborate hoax. Everyone comes out of the body bags and attack the driver, resulting in the van swerving off road and rolling down a hillside. The episode ends with Joe being tased by "The Program".
13	"Shadows in the Cave"^{[†]}	Michael Rymer	Remi Aubuchon	August 28, 2010	4002-08-113	2.85
After the vehicle accident, the group has split up. Moira and Erika have made their way to Morocco. Charlie and Blackham are somewhere in America driving aimlessly in a stolen car. Janet is hospitalized in the psychiatric wing of a hospital in San Francisco. McNair has been taken captive by the program; Joe remains in their custody after having sacrificed himself so the others could escape. When Renbe and Kat find out Janet is in the hospital, they go to find her only to be abducted by the men in blue. The madame director proves to have influence at the hospital, posing as a doctor and dismissing Janet's stories of the town as delusions. Janet escapes and makes her way to her mother's house to be reunited with her daughter. Sam takes Janet and her daughter toward the border, stopping overnight in a hotel. When Janet awakens, she is back in the hotel at the town. She exits her room to discover Moira, Charlie, Erika, Bill and Graham have all been returned as well. Meanwhile Kat is taken to a horrifying prison camp and caged; Ambassador Fairchild is there as well. Joe also awakens in the town hotel and discovers a whole new group of abductees including Renbe; their hotel manager is Tori. Janet's group boards the hotel elevator and it opens up to reveal that they are actually on a massive boat in the middle of the ocean, not back in the town. They are met by the old night manager, who says to them: "Welcome to level two". Lastly, the name of the ship is revealed to be "Almas Perdidas", a Spanish or Portuguese phrase which translates to "Lost Souls".

- † These episodes of the series did not air on some NBC affiliates (including its flagship owned-and-operated station in New York City, as well as its affiliates in Detroit and Seattle, to name a few) due to local NFL preseason games that were scheduled to air in those cities in late August before NBC moved the show from Monday to Saturday nights.
- ‡ The episode "Seven Sacrifices" did not air on NBC at all, due to the network making the decision to air an NFL on NBC broadcast. Instead the episode was posted on NBC.com.

== Production ==
Persons Unknown was produced by Fox Television Studios through its international model, where series are produced for the United States market with the help of international financing. Filming occurs in foreign locations where production costs are lower, and the series is "pre-sold" to international broadcasters. The completed series is then pitched for sale to American networks for pick up.

Persons Unknown was created by Christopher McQuarrie. In September 2008, Fox announced that it was beginning production of the series, which was co-financed by Televisa in Mexico and Italy's RAI. Filming began in late October 2008 in Mexico City, soon after announcement that Michael Rymer was hired to direct the first episode. Thirteen episodes were produced.

In March 2009, Variety reported that Fox was looking for a network to purchase the series. NBC announced it had acquired the broadcast rights to the series in July 2009.

In July 2010, executive producer Remi Aubuchon promised that the show would "provide all the answers to the questions that we set up". The series finale was criticized for not following through on this statement. On April 3, 2012, in an interview with CliqueClack TV, Aubuchon revealed many of the unanswered plot points of the series, including some of what was planned for a second season.

== Online game ==
An online game "Clock the Cams" was available to be hosted on the NBC website in June 2010, but was later taken down.

== Broadcast ==
Persons Unknown premiered on NBC on June 7, 2010, and the series finale aired on August 28, 2010. Reruns of the series begin to air on Chiller on May 1, 2014. The series has been broadcast in a number of countries worldwide. The series premiered on Rai 2 in Italy on September 10, 2010, and ended on December 3, 2010. The series also aired on Ztélé in Canada, TPS Star in France, OSN in Middle East and North Africa, TV3 New Zealand in New Zealand, TV3 Lithuania in Lithuania, CHASE on BEAM 31 in Philippines, FX in Greece, TV2 Zulu in Denmark, RTL 5 in the Netherlands, and Fox Crime in Serbia, Japan and Spain. In the United Kingdom, the series premiered on Syfy on October 31, 2011. It also premiered on Fox in Poland on April 2, 2012. The series had its series premiere on Prima Cool in Czech Republic on July 1, 2012, and it has since aired on TV2 in Norway, Fox in Portugal, REN-TV in Russia, 2BE in Belgium and MTV3 in Finland.

== Home media ==
A complete series DVD, "Persons Unknown: The Complete First Season" was going to be released on September 7, 2010, after being pushed back from an initial August 14, 2010 release. As of 2025, it is currently unknown which are the release dates have ever been.

Nowadays, it was added to Netflix on September 15, 2014;and it was later removed from the streaming on September 19, 2017. It is currently available for purchase on other services such as iTunes and Amazon Prime Video.

== Reception ==
=== Critical response ===
Randee Dawn of Associated Press wrote that its "clever setup and moody atmosphere make this place worth checking into." Maureen Ryan of the Chicago Tribune said the "...pilot efficiently lays out its premise and ratchets up the pressure on the characters, who are only types so far, but it doesn't matter because the plot's the thing here." Overall the show received mixed or average reviews according to Metacritic where it received a score of 49 points out of 100. Rotten Tomatoes reported that the show had a 61% approval rating based on 18 critic reviews, stating "Persons Unknown squanders its intriguing premise by plopping ill-defined characters into a scenario that calls for compelling personalities -- thankfully, viewers can easily find the exit from this hell of other people."

=== Ratings ===
Season	Episodes	Original airing			Viewers (in millions)	Network
Season	Episodes	Season premiere	Season finale	TV Season	Viewers (in millions)	Network
1	13	June 7, 2010	August 28, 2010	2009–2010	2.7	NBC

== See also ==
- Wayward Pines - another TV series with the same premise of a town that no one can escape from.
