= Daisy Betts =

Australian actress

- Born: 1 February 1982 (age 44); Sydney, Australia
- Occupation: Actress
- Years active: 2006–present
- Spouse: Paul Miller
- Children: 4

Daisy Betts Miller (born 1 February 1982) is an Australian actress, who starred in Australian soap opera Out of the Blue and American series Persons Unknown and Last Resort, playing Lieutenant Grace Shepard in the latter.

== Early life ==
Daisy Betts was born in Sydney, New South Wales. She has three sisters. She studied commerce and psychology before deciding to pursue a career in acting, studying at the National Institute of Dramatic Art (NIDA). She also trained with the Australian Speech and Communication Association.

== Career ==
Betts made her television debut as Amber, a minor character in "The Reunion", the final episode of 2006 Australian TV movie series Small Claims, opposite Rebecca Gibney and Claudia Karvan. She had a recurring role as Sally Blake, the wife of Chris Blake, in the 2007–2008 Australian TV series Sea Patrol. and a small role as the character Natasha in 2008 American horror film Shutter, alongside Joshua Jackson and Rachael Taylor.

That same year, Betts performed in the most prominent role of her career, in Australian/UK soap opera, Out of the Blue. The show, based in the Sydney beachside suburb of Manly, focused on a group of 30-something friends who return to their home town for a high school reunion. As the major character Peta Lee, a 27-year old lawyer and girlfriend of Poppy, she appeared alongside an ensemble cast including Zoe Carides, Diane Craig, Ryan Johnson, Daniel Henshall and Samara Weaving for the duration of the series.

In 2010, Betts was cast as Janet Cooper in NBC thriller series Persons Unknown. The character was a single mother from San Francisco who owned a daycare centre and was mysteriously abducted. After the abduction, her character appeared in a ghost town with several strangers. She became the object of desire for multiple characters (both male and female) in the town. That same year, she also starred with Ben Oxenbould, Simon Lyndon, Leeanna Walsman and Peter Phelps in 2010 independent Australian film Caught Inside, and with Kevin Zegers and Katie Cassidy in American TV movie Georgetown as Sam Whitman.

Betts then starred as Lieutenant Grace Shepard in the ABC American military drama series Last Resort, which premiered in September 2012. In 2014, she had a recurring role on the second season of Chicago Fire as firefighter, Rebecca Jones. The role came to an end, when halfway through the season, the character took her own life.

In 2015, Betts played the role of Ellie Stormgren in American-Australian sci-fi miniseries Childhood's End, based on Arthur C. Clarke's 1953 novel of the same name, opposite Mike Vogel and a largely Australian cast. That same year, she also had a starring role as Ginny in short-lived NBC action-crime series The Player, alongside Wesley Snipes. In 2017, she joined the cast of Bravo comedy-drama series Girlfriends' Guide to Divorce during its third season, playing the recurring role of eccentric billionaire Gemma.

More recently, Betts played Helen Smallbone in 2024 American Christian drama film Unsung Hero, which documents the early life of Rebecca St. James, Joel Smallbone, Luke Smallbone, and their family after they immigrate from Australia to America.

== Personal life ==
Betts is married to Australian boxer Paul Miller, with whom she has four children. The family relocated to Los Angeles for almost a decade, before returning to Brisbane in 2019, when Betts was pregnant with her fourth child, to prioritise raising her family and to take a hiatus from acting. Her husband also established his business, Magic Boxing there. She returned to acting in 2024.

== Filmography ==
=== Film ===
Year	Title	Role	Notes	Ref.
2008	Shutter	Natasha	Feature film	
2010	Caught Inside	Sam	Feature film	
2015	The Recruit	Felix Verlin	Short film	
2017	Weddings Inc.	Jenny	Short film	
2024	Unsung Hero	Helen Smallbone	Feature film	

=== Television ===
Year	Title	Role	Notes	Ref.
2006	Small Claims: The Reunion	Amber	TV film	
2007–2011	Sea Patrol	Sally Blake	Recurring role, 5 episodes	
2008	All Saints	Jennifer Constable	Episode: "Caught in a Trap"	
2008	Out of the Blue	Peta Lee	Main role, 65 episodes	
2010	Persons Unknown	Janet Cooper	Main role, 13 episodes	
2011	Georgetown	Samantha 'Sam' Whitman	TV film	
2011	East West 101	TV Reporter	Episode: "The Hero's Standard"	
2011	Harry's Law	Bethany Sanders	3 episodes	
2012–2013	Last Resort	Lt. Grace Shepard	Main role, 13 episodes	
2014	Chicago Fire	Rebecca Jones	Recurring role, 7 episodes	
2015	Castle	A.J. / Assassin	2 episodes	
2015	The Player	Virginia 'Ginny' Lee	Recurring role, 6 episodes	
2015	Childhood's End	Ellie Stormgren	Miniseries, 3 episodes	
2017	Keiks & Gigi	Keiks	TV short film	
2017	Girlfriends' Guide to Divorce	Gemma	Recurring role, 6 episodes	
