= Shooting in Vain =

- Directed by: Jared Januschka
- Written by: D. H. Nelson
- Produced by: Jared Januschka
- Starring: Sebastian Gregory; Diana Hopper; Isabel Lucas; Alexandra Park; Ryan Shoos
- Cinematography: Nicholas Matthews
- Edited by: Rafael Baez Jr. Jared Januschka
- Music by: Robert Allaire
- Production companies: Januschka Productions; China Lion Entertainment Productions
- Distributed by: Screen Media
- Release date: 14 June 2018 (Dances With Films)
- Running time: 90 minutes
- Country: United States
- Language: English

Shooting in Vain is a 2018 American drama film directed by Jared Januschka, starring Sebastian Gregory, Diana Hopper, Isabel Lucas, Alexandra Park and Ryan Shoos.

== Cast ==
- Sebastian Gregory as Maxfield Young
- Diana Hopper as Raine Bennett
- Isabel Lucas as Kali Stewart
- Alexandra Park as Lucy
- Ryan Shoos as Jimmy
- Michael L. McNulty as Calvin
- Maria Maestas McCann as Diane
- Colleen Kelly as Jane
- Jackson Odell as Chuck

== Release ==
The film premiered at Dances With Films on 14 June 2018.

== Reception ==
Paul Parcellin of Film Threat gave the film a score of 7.5/10 and called it a "portrait of an individual who is difficult to pin down, not because he’s a self-aggrandizing liar — we’ve seen some world-class examples of that in recent times — but one who acknowledges that most of us are less than honest with ourselves, and therefore unlikely to tell others the truth, the whole truth and nothing but the truth."

Keith Uhlich of The Hollywood Reporter called the film "ludicrously somber" and wrote that it "deserves a smack".
