= Accidents Happen =

- Promotional poster
- Directed by: Andrew Lancaster
- Written by: Brian Carbee
- Produced by: Anthony Anderson
- Starring: Geena Davis; Harrison Gilbertson; Ivy Latimer; Harry Cook; Joel Tobeck
- Narrated by: Tyler Coppin
- Cinematography: Ben Nott
- Edited by: Roland Gallois
- Distributed by: Christal Films
- Release dates: 23 April 2009 (Tribeca); 22 April 2010 (Australia)
- Countries: Australia; United Kingdom
- Language: English
- Budget: A$6,000,000
- Box office: $157,131

Accidents Happen is a 2009 Australian comedy drama film directed by Andrew Lancaster and starring Geena Davis, Harrison Gilbertson, Harry Cook, Sebastian Gregory, Joel Tobeck, and Sarah Woods. Written by Brian Carbee, based on his childhood and adolescence, the story revolves around an accident-prone teenage boy and his family. The film was shot in Sydney, New South Wales, in 2008, and opened in Australia on 22 April 2010.

At the ARIA Music Awards of 2010 the soundtrack was nominated for ARIA Award for Best Original Soundtrack, Cast or Show Album.

== Plot ==
In 1974, the Conway family is at a drive-in theater in Connecticut watching The Three Stooges. The parents are Gloria (Geena Davis), a foul-mouthed and strict mother who will always take responsibility over the family, Ray (Joel Tobeck), an easy-going father, and siblings Linda, Gene, Larry (Harry Cook), and Billy (Harrison Gilbertson), who is an accident-prone child. In the meantime, the Conways' neighbor, Douglas "Doug" Post (Sebastian Gregory), whom Gloria hates, drives by on his bike. Gene leads him up to the top of the drive-in screen. Gene then proceeds to urinate out of the screen. While Gloria trips as she approaches the screen, infuriated and confused guests honk at Gene and Doug. While driving back home in the rain, an argument among two of the children distracts Ray, causing the car to collide with a pick-up truck. Although Gloria, Ray, Billy, and Larry suffer only minor injuries, Linda is killed, and Gene is severely injured, leaving him brain-damaged and paralyzed from the head down.

In 1982, 8 years after the accident, Ray is divorced, and more problems arise concerning Doug and Gene's condition, which could cause his death at any time. 15-year-old Billy is still friends with Doug even after the accident. One night, an argument occurs over a TV dinner with Larry, now a belligerent and profane alcoholic. Billy accidentally knocks over the dinner, and it lands on him, burning his back. When Doug overhears what is happening, he intervenes and gets into a short scuffle with Larry, as Billy blames his brother for the burn on his back. After streaking and robbing a convenience store, Billy and Doug are playing when he causes an almighty crash with a bowling ball and a moving car, killing Doug's father. Just a few days after the incident, Larry's incessant harassment causes Billy to fight against his older brother. When Gloria breaks up the scuffle and discovers a gauze on Billy's back (after Billy knocked the TV dinner and injured himself, and on the newspapers regarding the robbery that Billy was wearing the gauze), Larry immediately tells her that Billy and Doug went streaking and stealing things as evidence, but is still taken away by Ray, who came to cause another argument with Gloria over their divorce. Because Billy has no way to hide any of the evidence, an incensed Gloria reprimands and admonishes him, permanently forbidding him from seeing Doug. Although she knows what Billy and Doug did, Gloria does not know they caused the car crash that killed Doug's father.

When Doug receives a mistaken note that his father committed suicide and that the insurance company does not pay for suicide, they decide that it is time to confess to the police as to what happened. When Billy tells this to Gloria, she describes him as a selfish son, slaps him across the face in disbelief, and breaks down in tears. As the police interrogate Billy and Doug, the family receives word that Gene has finally died. It is then revealed that when Doug attended Gene's funeral, Gloria had forgiven him for what happened. The movie ends when Billy takes the bowling ball found after the fatal accident and rolls it down the sidewalk as Billy looks on.

== Cast ==
- Geena Davis as Gloria Conway
- Harrison Gilbertson as Billy Conway
- Harry Cook as Larry Conway
- Ivy Latimer as Linda Conway
- Joel Tobeck as Ray Conway
- Sebastian Gregory as Doug Post
- Sarah Woods as Dottie Post
- Erik Thomson as Bob
- Rebecca Massey as Louise
- Morgan Griffin as Katrina
- Wendy Playfair as Mrs. Smolensky
- Nathan Page as Sexy Man
- Tyler Coppin as Narrator

== Production ==
American-born screenwriter Brian Carbee wrote Accidents Happen based on his childhood in 1980s Connecticut, changing his own name to "Billy Conway". He had previously performed in a one person show titled In Search of Mike, which director Andrew Lancaster saw and asked Carbee if he would adapt the show to a short film. Carbee subsequently wrote a novel which served as the basis for his Accidents Happen screenplay. He developed the screenplay through the prestigious Aurora Script Workshop in Sydney, where producer Anthony Anderson had worked and collaborated on his 2004 film Somersault. In 2004, the completed script was nominated for an Australian Inside Film Award for Best Unproduced Screenplay, but it took a further three years to gather finances for the project. Anderson, Carbee and Lancaster successfully applied for funding from Screen Australia on two occasions; they were granted A$18,000 in May 2003 to fund drafts of the script, and $50,000 in November 2007. In September 2005, Anderson traveled to New York City with three other Australian producers to meet with investors at No Borders Co-Production Market, a division of the Independent Feature Project Market in which filmmakers attempt to secure financing for their projects. The film was the first production from the Abacus Film Fund, co-founded by producer Heather Ogilvie and corporate advisers BG Capital Corporation. British production company Bankside Films of London also assisted in raising finances and is handling all international sales of the film. The filmmakers received a 40% rebate on all production costs from Screen Australia. Davis was the only American actor to be cast, in spite of the story's American setting; the rest of the cast is Australian, with feigned American accents.

"My dad and I drove around Ku-ring-gai scouting locations. St Ives was chosen as the ideal spot for its deciduous trees and big front yards. If you pan the camera one way you get Connecticut, if you pan it the other way you get St Ives. We just had to make sure the gum trees weren't in shot."

— Andrew Lancaster on St Ives' standing in for Connecticut

Accidents Happen was originally intended to be filmed in Connecticut, where it is set, but production remained in Australia, where the script had been written, because finances were easier to raise than in the United States. Filming was slated to begin in April 2008 but was delayed until June. Lancaster said that he did "a huge amount of technical preparation" before filming began, so that on the set, he could focus his directing on the actors' performances, since the cast were largely inexperienced. Principal photography commenced in early June with scenes shot on a built set at Sydney's Fox Studios. Most filming took place in and around Kuringgai, first on Gillian Parade in West Pymble for a week in late June and then Lincoln St, St Ives for 1–2 July. Lincoln St residents complained about possible disruptions to Ku-ring-gai Council, starting a petition to have production moved elsewhere, and threatening to play bagpipes and wave lights around during filming if it went on as planned. The council then offered a revised filming schedule, cutting filming down by two days and bringing each day's finishing time forward by an hour to 12:30 am, and the producers offered some residents a $500 payment to cover any inconveniences. Filming of the story's integral car-crash scene was relocated to another street after the discord.

== Release ==
Select footage of Accidents Happen was screened to potential distributors at the 2008 Toronto International Film Festival and was shown at the American Film Market in November 2008. The final cut of the film had its world premiere on 23 April 2009 at the Tribeca Film Festival and was screened in June 2009 at the Sydney Film Festival. It was shown in October 2009 at the Branchage Jersey Film Festival, the Cinéma des Antipodes festival in Saint Tropez, and the Sitges Film Festival.

=== Box office ===
Accidents Happen took in $157,131 at the box office in Australia.

== Reception ==
Rotten Tomatoes, a review aggregator, reports that six of ten surveyed critics gave the film a positive review; the average rating was 5.7/10. Russell Edwards of Variety wrote, "John Irving-style mishaps and labored irony fail to maintain drama or coherence in Accidents Happen, an Australian-made, faux-American dysfunctional-family black comedy."

== See also ==
- Cinema of Australia
