= Joe Kelly (parenting writer) =

American author

Joe Kelly (born 1954) is an American author known primarily for books on fathering.

== Career ==
Kelly was born in northern New Jersey, and grew up in Ohio and South Jersey. He attended LeMoyne College and graduated from the University of Wisconsin–Superior. Before working on girls’ and fathering issues, Kelly was a reporter, producer, and regional news director for Minnesota Public Radio.

In 1993, he helped his wife Nancy Gruver to found New Moon magazine, edited by girls 8 to 14 years old.

In 1999, he was co-founder, with Michael Kieschnick, of a national advocacy nonprofit for fathers and daughters in the United States, Dads and Daughters (DADs), In 2004, Dads and Daughters successfully lobbied Verizon Communications to remove an advertisement depicting a computer-illiterate father being reproved by his precocious daughter and scolding wife. DADs operated until 2008. Some Dads and Daughters materials can be found at Kelly's website The Dad Man.

== Books ==
Kelly is the author of several books on fathering.

- Kelly, Joe (May 14, 2002). Dads and Daughters: How to Inspire, Understand, and Support Your Daughter When She's Growing Up So Fast (hardcover 1st. ed.). Broadway. ISBN 0-7679-0833-3.
- Kelly, Joe (January 7, 2014). The Idiot's Guide to Pregnancy for Dads (paperback ed.). Alpha. ISBN 978-1615644346.
- Kelly, Joe (April 2, 2013). The Complete Idiot's Guide to Being a New Dad (paperback ed.). Alpha. ISBN 978-1615642472.
- Kelly, Joe (May 4, 2004). Pocket Idiot's Guide for the Expectant Father (paperback ed.). Alpha. ISBN 1-59257-224-3.
- Maine, Margo; Joe Kelly (June 28, 2005). The Body Myth: Adult Women and the Pressure to Be Perfect (hardcover ed.). Hoboken, NJ: John Wiley & Sons. ISBN 0-471-69158-5.
- Kelly, Joe (May 14, 2007). The Dads & Daughters Togetherness Guide: 54 Fun Activities to Help Build a Great Relationship (paperback 1st. ed.). Broadway. ISBN 978-0-7679-2469-6.
- Wildes, Lyle; Joe Kelly (January 1, 2009). The Positive Attitude Development Workbook (paperback 1st. ed.). Duluth, MN: Whole Person Associates. ISBN 978-1570252280.
- Costin, Carolyn; Joe Kelly (January 1, 2016). Yoga and Eating Disorders (paperback 1st. ed.). New York City: Taylor & Francis. ISBN 9781138908468.
- Sorbara Mora, Maria; Joe Kelly (January 1, 2020). Incorporating Science, Body, and Yoga in Nutrition-Based Eating Disorder Treatment and Recovery: The Integrated Eating Approach (paperback 1st. ed.). New York City: Routledge. ISBN 9781138584303.
- Maine, Margo; Joe Kelly (May 27, 2016). Pursuing Perfection: Eating Disorders, Body Myths, and Women at Midlife and Beyond (paperback ed.). New York City: Routledge. ISBN 978-1138890725.

== Personal ==
Kelly and his wife have twin daughters, who were born in 1980.
