= Somersault (film) =

- Theatrical release poster
- Directed by: Cate Shortland
- Written by: Cate Shortland
- Produced by: Anthony Anderson
- Starring: Abbie Cornish; Sam Worthington; Lynette Curran; Erik Thomson; Nathaniel Dean; Hollie Andrew; Leah Purcell
- Cinematography: Robert Humphreys
- Edited by: Scott Gray
- Music by: Decoder Ring
- Production company: Red Carpet Productions
- Distributed by: Hopscotch Films
- Release dates: 17 May 2004 (Cannes); 16 September 2004 (Australia)
- Running time: 106 minutes
- Country: Australia
- Language: English
- Budget: A$4 million
- Box office: A$2.1 million

Somersault is a 2004 Australian romantic drama film written and directed by Cate Shortland in her feature directorial debut. The film premiered on 16 September 2004 and was selected for the Un Certain Regard section at the 2004 Cannes Film Festival. It received widespread critical acclaim and made history at the 2004 Australian Film Institute Awards by winning all 13 categories in which it was nominated, including Best Film, Best Direction, and Best Actress.

Set in the snowy mountain town of Jindabyne, New South Wales, the film follows 16-year-old Heidi (Abbie Cornish), who runs away from her Canberra home after making an advance toward her mother's boyfriend. Seeking connection and stability, she meets Joe (Sam Worthington), the emotionally reserved son of a local farmer, and begins a tentative relationship with him. The film explores themes of sexual awakening, emotional vulnerability, and personal identity.

The soundtrack, composed and performed by Australian band Decoder Ring, was nominated for Best Original Soundtrack Album at the 2004 ARIA Music Awards.

== Plot ==
The film follows Heidi, a teenager from suburban Canberra, who runs away after making a sexual advance toward her mother's boyfriend. When caught, she flees to a ski town in the Snowy Mountains, hoping to reconnect with a man who once offered her help. But when she calls him, his wife answers, and he denies knowing her. Alone and adrift, Heidi wanders through bars and shops seeking help, but no one shows interest—until she meets Joe, a young man who buys her a drink and offers her a place to sleep.

The next morning, Joe leaves for work, and Heidi befriends Irene, the kind but stern motel manager. Irene lets her stay temporarily and later moves her into her son's vacant flat. To pay rent, Heidi finds a job at a petrol station and starts to build a fragile routine. Joe runs into her again, and their connection resumes, though unevenly. Heidi also becomes friends with her co-worker Bianca, who offers warmth and companionship.

Joe and Heidi begin dating, but their bond is unstable. When Joe's friends mock Heidi's job, she feels humiliated. At dinner, her vulnerability shows as she asks Joe if he loves her. His silence leads her to eat an entire bowl of hot chilies in distress. Joe helps her vomit, then leaves her at the motel and later gets drunk at a party. He ends up at his neighbor Richard's house, where, in a moment of confusion, he kisses Richard—who gently challenges Joe's self-awareness. The next day, Joe returns home and breaks down in front of his emotionally distant father.

Meanwhile, Heidi realizes that Bianca's father is the man she had previously tried to seduce. When he gives her a ride home, he warns her to stay away from Bianca. The next day, Bianca confronts her, and Heidi storms out of the petrol station, quitting her job. That night, she drinks heavily at a nightclub and brings two men home. One begins to undress and prepare to assault her, but Joe arrives just in time to stop it. After rescuing her, Joe expresses anger at her behavior, and when Heidi accuses him of not caring, he does not deny it and drives away.

The following morning, Irene asks Heidi to leave. In a tense exchange, Heidi admits her mother is alive and Irene reveals her own son is in prison for murder. Irene urges Heidi to reconcile with her mother. Later that day, Joe returns, surprised to find Heidi packing. As they wait together for her mother's arrival, Joe finally holds her hand. When her mother arrives, Joe tries to kiss her goodbye, but Heidi stops him, saying simply that she's glad they met. She leaves with her mother, watching the snowy landscape drift past as the film ends.

== Cast ==
- Abbie Cornish as Heidi
- Sam Worthington as Joe
- Lynette Curran as Irene
- Nathaniel Dean as Stuart
- Erik Thomson as Richard
- Leah Purcell as Diane
- Hollie Andrew as Bianca
- Paul Gleeson as Roy
- Olivia Pigeot as Nicole
- Damian De Montemas as Adam
- Anne Louise Lambert as Martha
- Diana Glenn as Sally
- Toby Schmitz as John
- Ben Tate as Sean

== Reception ==
Somersault grossed $2,158,574 at the box office in Australia and was well received by critics. On review aggregator Rotten Tomatoes, the film has an approval rating of 84% based on 69 reviews, with an average rating of 6.9/10. The website's critics consensus reads, "A poignant coming-of-age tale marked by a breakout lead performance from Abbie Cornish and a successful directorial debut from Cate Shortland." On Metacritic, the film has a weighted average score of 73, based on 21 critics, indicating "generally favorable reviews".

Margaret Pomeranz and David Stratton of At the Movies both praised the film, giving it 4 stars. In her review, Pomeranz wrote "There's no doubting Cate Shortland's talent. Her vision for this film is delicate and wrenching, tentatively optimistic. I have images from the film that haunt me still, Heidi's hands – that ultimate connecting point of us all, her vulnerable body wrapped up against the cold in her pale blue parka, the landscape of that world at the bottom of the mountains". She gave additional praise to the performances of the cast.

Fenella Kernebone for SBS noted "Somersault is a real labour of love for Cate Shortland and every element in the film is carefully considered." Kernebone awarded the film four stars out of five. Somersault premiered at the 2004 Cannes Film Festival, where it was screened as part of the Un Certain Regard and was the only Australian feature film at the festival that year.

Katie Ellis noted Somersault as an important film in the growth of representation of autistic characters in Australian cinema, with Bianca's Asperger syndrome brother Karl being an "underdeveloped but pivotal character whose Aspergers helps to reveal the inner world of the main characters, Heidi and Joe".

=== Accolades ===
In the 2004 AFI Awards held on 29 October at Regent Theatre, Melbourne, Somersault made history by winning in all 13 categories. The film won the following awards: Best Film (awarded to producers Anthony Anderson and Jan Chapman); Best Direction (Cate Shortland); Best Original Screenplay (Cate Shortland); Best Actress in a Leading Role (Abbie Cornish); Best Actor in a Leading Role (Sam Worthington); Best Actress in a Supporting Role (Lynette Curran); Best Actor in a Supporting Role (Erik Thomson); Best Editing (Scott Gray); Best Cinematography (Robert Humphreys, A.C.S.); Best Sound (Mark Blackwell, Peter Smith and Sam Petty); Best Original Music Score (Decoder Ring); Best Production Design (Melinda Doring); Best Costume Design (Emily Seresin).

Somersault was also a big winner at the 2004 Film Critics Circle of Australia (FCCA) Annual Awards where it picked up five awards: Best Film; Best Director (Cate Shortland); Best Actress (Abbie Cornish); Best Cinematography (Robert Humphreys); Best Actress in a Supporting Role (Lynette Curran).

The film also dominated the publicly voted Lexus IF Awards, taking out six of its eight nominations. It won awards in the following categories: Best Director (Cate Shortland), Best Music, Best Cinematography, Best Script, Best Feature Film and Best Actress for Abbie Cornish.
