= Brian Carbee =

- Occupation: scriptwriter

Brian Carbee is a US born, Australian resident scriptwriter of Accidents Happen, the first feature film of Andrew Lancaster, for whom he also wrote and choreographed the short film In Search of Mike. Carbee has been a dancer and choreographer for Limbs, Douglas Wright Dance, Chunky Move and his own company Jump Giants. He won a 2005 Australian Dance Award for best choreography for In the Dark, directed by Wendy Houstoun, and won a Special Festival Award for his production of Stretching It Wider at the 2001 Mardi Gras Gay and Lesbian Arts Festival. He is a contemporary dance teacher based in Sydney, Australia.

== Filmography ==
Year	Title	Role	Notes
1988	Send a Gorilla	Male customer	
2003	Fat Pizza	Krishna Priest	
2003	Peter Pan	Albino (Pirate Crew)	
2009	Accidents Happen	Bingo Caller	(final film role)
