= Prime Mover (film) =

- Directed by: David Caesar
- Written by: David Caesar
- Produced by: Vincent Sheehan
- Starring: Michael Dorman; Emily Barclay; Ben Mendelsohn; Gyton Grantley; William McInnes; Anthony Hayes; Andrew S. Gilbert
- Cinematography: Hugh Miller
- Edited by: Mark Perry
- Music by: Paul Healy
- Production companies: Screen Australia; The New South Wales Film & Television Office
- Distributed by: Transmission Films
- Release date: 8 June 2009
- Running time: 90 minutes
- Country: Australia
- Language: English
- Budget: A$5 million

Prime Mover is a 2009 Australian romantic crime film which stars Michael Dorman, Emily Barclay, Ben Mendelsohn, Gyton Grantley, William McInnes, Anthony Hayes and Andrew S. Gilbert. It is directed by acclaimed film and television director David Caesar of Mullet and Dirty Deeds fame, in which he also worked with McInnes, Mendelsohn and Gilbert.

The film was released to European audiences in Germany on 8 February 2009 and in Australia on 8 June 2009.

== Cast ==
- Michael Dorman as Thomas
- Emily Barclay as Melissa / Calendar girl
- Ben Mendelsohn as Johnnie
- Gyton Grantley as Repo Man #1
- William McInnes as Phil
- Anthony Hayes as Salesman / Mechanic - Business Man / Foreman
- Andrew S. Gilbert as Thomas' dad
- Anni Finsterer as Thomas' mum

== Production ==
David Caesar first wrote the script in 1983. The Australian Film Commission had provided Caesar money to research the script in Alice Springs and offered him $1 million to make the movie but Caesar felt that he needed $2 million. In the late 1980s he almost got the film funded through the Film Finance Corporation but was unable and instead made Greenkeeper.

== Box office ==
Prime Mover grossed $52,119 at the box office in Australia.

== See also ==
- Cinema of Australia
