= Film Critics Circle of Australia Awards 2005 =

Australian film award

15th Film Critics Circle of Australia Awards

14 November 2005

Best Film:

Look Both Ways

Best Foreign Film - English language:

Million Dollar Baby

The 15th Film Critics Circle of Australia Awards, given on 14 November 2005, honored the best in film for 2005.

== Winners ==
- Best Actor:
  - William McInnes - Look Both Ways
- Best Actress:
  - Cate Blanchett - Little Fish
- Best Australian Feature Documentary:
  - Rash
- Best Australian Short Documentary:
  - Girl in a Mirror
- Best Australian Short Film:
  - Jewboy
- Best Cinematography:
  - The Proposition - Benoît Delhomme
- Best Director:
  - Sarah Watt - Look Both Ways
- Best Editor:
  - Denise Haratzis - Look Both Ways
- Best Film:
  - Look Both Ways
- Best Foreign Film – English Language:
  - Million Dollar Baby
- Best Foreign Language Film:
  - Mar adentro (The Sea Inside), Spain
- Best Musical Score:
  - The Proposition - Nick Cave and Warren Ellis
- Best Screenplay - Adapted:
  - Three Dollars - Robert Connolly and Elliot Perlman
- Best Screenplay - Original:
  - Look Both Ways - Sarah Watt
- Best Supporting Actor:
  - Hugo Weaving - Little Fish
- Best Supporting Actress:
  - Noni Hazlehurst - Little Fish
- Acknowledgement of Emerging Talent:
  - Tim Dean (directing)
