= Andrew S. Gilbert =

Australian actor

Andrew Gilbert
- Born: Andrew S. Gilbert; 31 July 1961 (age 65); Sydney, Australia
- Occupation: Actor
- Spouse: Jodie Gregson
- Children: 3
- Awards: AFI Award -Best Performance by an Actor in a Supporting Role (1997) FCCA Award Best Supporting Actor - Male - Kiss or Kill (2002) FCAA Award; Best Supporting Actor - Male; 2002 Mullet

Andrew S. Gilbert is an Australian actor best known for his portrayal of Tony Twist in Round the Twist (Series 3–4).

== Career ==
Gilbert is also well known for his AFI Award-winning role in Kiss or Kill and other supporting work in Look Both Ways and The Dish, as well as his role as Gavin Braithwaite on the ABC series Bed of Roses.

He is also known for his collaboration with director David Caesar on his films Idiot Box, Mullet, Dirty Deeds and Prime Mover.

== Filmography ==
=== Film ===
Year	Title	Role	Notes
1991	Sweet Talker	Harold Lewis	Feature film
1991	Deadly	Constable Peter Morton	Film
1993	Shotgun Wedding	Bruce Llewellyn	Feature film
1993	The Custodian	Cameraman	Feature film
1993	No Worries	Uncle Kev	Feature film
1996	Idiot Box	Greg / Laughing Boy	Feature film
1997	Oscar and Lucinda	Expeditioner	Feature film
1997	Kiss or Kill	Detective Crean	Feature film
1998	Justice	MacMurphy	Feature film
1999	In a Savage Land	Gerry	Feature film
1999	Paperback Hero	Hamish	Feature film
2000	The Dish	Len Purvis	Feature film
2001	Mullet	Peter Maloney	Feature film
2002	Rabbit-Proof Fence	Jigalong Depot Manager	Feature film
2002	Dirty Deeds	Peter "Norm" Maloney	Feature film
2002	The Real Thing	Detective	Film
2003	Ned Kelly	Stanistreet	Feature film
2005	Look Both Ways	Phil	Feature film
2006	Wil	Dan - Boss 2	Film
2007	Lucky Miles	Policeman #1	Feature film
2007	The Jammed	Mr. Glassman	Feature film
2009	Prime Mover	Thomas' Dad	Feature film
2010	The Loved Ones	Paul	Feature film
2013	Backyard Ashes	Dougie Waters	Feature film
2015	Holding the Man	Father Wallbridge	Feature film
2016	Highway	Freddie	Short film
2017	That's Not Me	Stephen Cluthbert	Feature film
2017	Amaretta	The Vice Principal	Short film
2019	UNTITLED: Saturn Returns		Short film
2020	Children of the Corn	Sheriff Gebler	Feature film
2021	Some Happy Day	Stewart	Film
2022	Girl at the Window	John Nordoff	Feature film

=== Television ===
Year	Title	Role	Notes
1989	Mortgage	Kevin Grant	TV series
1991	Home and Away	Ian Gardiner	TV series
1995	Cody	Williams	TV series
1996	Water Rats	Jimmy Holloway	TV series
1998	Wildside	Dean Tapley	TV series
1999	Blue Heelers	Rod Cathcart	TV series
2000–2001	Round the Twist	Tony Twist	TV series, seasons 3–4
2001	Blue Heelers	Bill Barker	TV series
2002	Worst Best Friends	Mr. Thesaurus	TV series
2003	MDA	Roy Johnson	TV series
2004	The Brush-Off	Duncan Keogh	TV series
2004	Stingers	Benjamin Mortlock	TV series
2004	Loot	Carl Doakes	TV series
2006	McLeod's Daughters	Joel Sanderson	TV series
2007	The Librarians	Sergeant Barnes	TV series
2008	Underbelly	Victor Peirce	TV series
2008–2010	Bed of Roses	Gavin Braithwaite	TV series
2014	Never Tear Us Apart: The Untold Story of INXS	Dennis Farris	TV series, 2 episodes
2014	The Doctor Blake Mysteries	Martin Carlow	TV series, 1 episode
2014	Winners & Losers	Bob	TV series, 2 episodes
2021–2022	Five Bedrooms	Des Elling	TV series, 2 episodes
2022	Girl at the Window	John Nordoff	Feature film
2022	Savage River	Hugh Lang	TV series, 3 episodes

== Theatre ==
Year	Title	Role	Notes
1994	That Eye, The Sky		Burning House Theatre Company, at Darlinghurst & Playhouse Theatre, Melbourne

== Awards ==
Gilbert has been nominated for an AFI Award three times—for Kiss or Kill, Mullet and Paperback Hero—winning for the earlier.

== Personal life ==
Gilbert's daughters, Olive, Miranda and Violet appeared alongside him in the film Look Both Ways.
