= My Year Without Sex =

- Film poster
- Directed by: Sarah Watt
- Written by: Sarah Watt
- Produced by: Bridget Ikin
- Starring: Sacha Horler; Matt Day
- Distributed by: Hibiscus Films
- Release date: 28 May 2009
- Running time: 92 minutes
- Country: Australia
- Language: English
- Budget: $4 million
- Box office: $1,125,871

My Year Without Sex is an Australian drama film written and directed by Sarah Watt, opening the 2009 Adelaide Film Festival and given wider release in May 2009.

== Cast ==
- Sacha Horler as Natalie
- Matt Day as Ross
- Portia Bradley as Ruby
- Jonathan Segat as Louis
- Sonya Suares as Rosie Singh
- Petru Gheorghiu as Con
- Travis Cotton as Howard
- Fred Whitlock as Greg
- Eva Rees as Blake
- Lauren Mikkor as Georgia
- Chloe Guymer as Chloe
- Katie Wall as Winona
- Daniela Farinacci as Clinic Doctor
- Rachael Maza as Intensive Care Nurse
- Eddie Baroo as Tim Donnelly
- Roger Oakley as Natalie's father
- William McInnes as Antionette / Radio voice
- Maude Davey as Margaret

== Synopsis ==
Set in Altona (suburban Melbourne), it is about a 30-something couple, Ross and Natalie, and their children Ruby and Louis, after Natalie suffers a ruptured brain aneurysm and is advised not to have sex for 12 months.

Watt has said that after her first film Look Both Ways, she wanted to make a film "without a sex scene":

I didn't want to be coy and just avoid it, but once we started playing with that title, the whole thing became about sex.

My ideas were so broad, about anxiety and non-sustainable consumerism and how a non-ruling-class family were coping with how to save for the future and the uncertainty in the work force.

And sex seemed a good way to corral it. A lot of our consumerism is about looking sexually attractive or being anxious.

My Year Without Sex received strongly favourable reviews, and was touted by The Sydney Morning Herald as "possibly the best" Australian film of 2009, as well as "the most accomplished" local film of 2009 by The Age.

As with Look Both Ways, My Year Without Sex deals with the impact that serious illness has on individuals and relationships. The two films are reportedly part of a "proposed trilogy". This film was the last film by Sarah Watt, about two years before she died of bone and breast cancer.

== Box office ==
My Year Without Sex grossed $1,125,871 at the box office in Australia.

== See also ==
- Cinema of Australia
- List of Australian films
