= Daniela Farinacci =

Australian actress

Daniela Farinacci (also credited as Daniella Farinaci) is an Australian actress of Italian descent, who has many television, film and theatre credits.

Farinacci is perhaps best known for her role in the Australian movie Lantana as Paula, alongside Vince Colosimo. She also appeared in supporting roles in Little Fish and Look Both Ways.

Farinacci is known for a starring role in the 2006 television mini-series The Society Murders as Maritza Wales, based on a real-life crime. She also has a starring role in the police television drama series, East West 101 as Helen Callas.

Her theatre roles include Juliet in Romeo & Juliet and Helena in A Midsummer Night's Dream and many more Melbourne theatre productions.

Farinacci was announced as part of the cast for the second season of Total Control, she also reprised her role for the third and final series. She was also announced as part of the cast for Channel 9’s Human Error.

== Filmography ==
=== Film ===
Year	Title	Role	Notes
2001	Lantana	Paula D'Amato	FCCA Award for Best Supporting Actor – Female; IF Award for Best Actress
2002	Baggage Claim	Kim	Short
2004	Josh Jarman	Maxine	
2004	Brothers	Rose	Short
2005	Look Both Ways	Julia	
2005	Little Fish	Donna	
2009	My Year Without Sex	Clinic Doctor	
2010	Lou	Mrs. Marchetti	
2010	Matching Jack	Ange	
2010	Lonesdale		
2015	Hope City	Immigration Officer	Short
2016	Close Observations of a Single Subject	The Handler	Short
2016	Lion	Tutor	
2018	The Widow	Luisa Benvenuto	Short

=== Television ===
Year	Title	Role	Notes
2000	Blue Heelers	Carol Gibson	TV series, episode: "Dance Crazy"
2001	Like Mother Like Son: The Strange Story of Sante and Kenny Kimes	Sante's Maid	TV film
2001	Halifax f.p.	Det. Koslinski	TV series, episode: "Playing God"
2002	Blue Heelers	Megan Crane	TV series, episode: "Wednesday's Child"
2002	The Secret Life of Us	Francesca	TV series, season 2, recurring role
2002-03	MDA	Dr. Wendy Rossi	TV series, recurring role
2005	BlackJack: Ace Point Game	Jenny Hasler	TV film
2005	Heartbreak Tour	Sergeant Wentworth	TV film
2006	Society Murders	Maritza Wales	TV film
2006	Penicillin: The Magic Bullet	Margaret Jennings	TV film
2007	City Homicide	Marion Palmer	TV series, episode: "Baby Love"
2007-11	East West 101	Detective Helen Callas	TV series, main role
2008	Rush	Rita	TV series, episode: "1.10"
2009	Carla Cametti PD	Teresa Cametti	TV series, main role
2012	Jack Irish: Black Tide	Glenda Painter	TV film
2012	Lowdown	Kara – 1st AD	TV series, episode: "Rex, Lies & Videotape"
2012	Dangerous Remedy	Mariah	TV film
2015	Redfern Now: Promise Me	Defence Lawyer	TV film
2015	Glitch	Maria Massola	Main role
2016	Tom Wills	Sarah Barbor	TV documentary
2016	Little Acorns	Daniela	TV series
2019	Welfare	Despina Karagiannis	TV series, episode: "PTSD"
2021	Fisk	Gina	TV series, 1 episode
2022-23	Black Snow	Katherine Bianchi	TV series, 5 episodes
2023-present	NCIS: Sydney	Foreign Minister Quinn	TV series, 2 episodes
2021-24	Total Control	Phillipa Bailey	TV series, 8 episodes
2024	Human Error	Chief Kirsten Leigh	TV series, 6 episodes
