= Bridget Ikin =

New Zealand/Australian film producer

- Born: Lower Hutt, New Zealand
- Education: University of Auckland; London University
- Occupation: Film producer
- Known for: An Angel at My Table (1990); Look Both Ways (2005)
- Website: www.felixmedia.com.au www.hibiscusfilms.com.au/index.html

Bridget Ikin is a New Zealand film producer who has lived and worked in Australia since 1990. She is known for the films An Angel at My Table (1990), Look Both Ways (2005), and Sherpa (2015). Her first film production company was Hibiscus Films, formed in New Zealand in the early 1980s, and subsequently moved to Australia, after she moved there in 1990. In Australia, she worked for various government-funded organisations before forming Felix Media with her partner, fellow producer John Maynard, in 2011.

== Early life and education ==
Bridget Ikin was born in Lower Hutt, New Zealand. She took a BA in English literature from the University of Auckland, followed by an MA from London University.

== Career ==
Ikin opened her film production company, Hibiscus Films, in the early 1980s in New Zealand. She was a member of NZ Women in Film and Television, lobbying for support for women filmmakers.

She moved to Australia in 1990. From 1996 to 2000, as head of SBS independent, she commissioned more than 400 hours of programming. She served as feature film evaluation manager at the Film Finance Corporation Australia (now Screen Australia) from 2005 to 2006 and was a board member of the South Australian Film Corporation for many years from 2007.

In 2011 Ikin and her partner John Maynard formed Felix Media a specialist production company that focuses on feature films made by visual artists and media environments such as Angelica Mesiti’s installation at the 2019 Venice Biennale 2019.

Ikin is a member of the Academy of Motion Picture Arts and Sciences.

== Filmography ==
- About Face (1986) - producer
- Talkback (1988) – producer
- Kitchen Sink (1989) – producer
- An Angel at My Table (1990) – producer
- Crush (1992) – producer
- Loaded (1994) – producer
- Floating Life (1996) – producer
- Walking on Water (2002) – executive producer
- The Tracker (2002) – executive producer
- Australian Rules (2002) – executive producer
- Look Both Ways (2005) – producer
- My Year Without Sex (2009) – producer
- Art + Soul (2010) documentary series – producer
- Sherpa (2015) – producer
- The Rehearsal (2016) – producer
- The Woman and the Car (2018) – producer
- It All Started With a Stale Sandwich (2019) – executive producer

== Awards and recognition ==
Ikin was awarded an honorary Doctor of Arts by the Australian Film and Television School in 2018.

Year	Nominated Work	Prize	Awards	Ref
1990	An Angel at My Table	Best Film	New Zealand Film Awards	
1990	An Angel at My Table	International Critics' Award	Toronto International Film Festival	
1990	An Angel at My Table	Grand Special Jury Prize (second prize), the Elvira Notari Prize, Agis Scuola Prize, and the OCIC Catholic award	Venice Film Festival	
1992	An Angel at My Table	Best Foreign Film	Independent Spirit Awards	
2005	Look Both Ways	Best Film	2005 Australian Film Institute Awards	
2015	Sherpa	Grierson Award for Documentary Film	London Film Festival	
2016	Sherpa	Best Feature Documentary	Film Critics Circle of Australia Awards	
2017	Sherpa	Best Documentary	Australian Film Critics Association	
