= List of East West 101 episodes =

The following is a list of episodes for the Australian television series, East West 101. The series began on 6 December 2007 and ran till 2011. 20 episodes have been aired. The series aired on the SBS network in Australia. The show is based on the New South Wales Police's Major Crimes Unit, starring Don Hany as a Muslim police officer named Detective Zane Malik and William McInnes as Anglo-Australian Detective Sergeant Ray Crowley as they investigate serious crimes in New South Wales affecting people of all races while trying to balance their lives, especially when the two officers had experienced tragic events that threatened to work against their ethics as policemen.

The first, second and third seasons are available on DVD. The second season was released on DVD before it began airing on SBS.

== Summary ==
Series	Episodes	Originally released		Average viewers	DVD release date
Series	Episodes	First released	Last released	Average viewers	DVD release date
1	6	6 December 2007	10 January 2008	331,300	14 February 2008
2	7	13 October 2009	24 November 2009	153,400	12 October 2009
3	7	20 April 2011	1 June 2011	219,000	9 May 2011

== Episodes ==
=== Season 1 (2007–08) ===
No. overall	No. in season	Title	Directed by	Written by	Original release date
1	1	"The Enemy Within"	Peter Andrikidis	Kristen Dunphy	6 December 2007
2	2	"Death at the Station"	Peter Andrikidis	Kris Wyld	13 December 2007
3	3	"Islander Sacrifice"	Peter Andrikidis	Michael Miller	20 December 2007
4	4	"Hunt for the Killer"	Peter Andrikidis	Kris Mrksa	27 December 2007
5	5	"Haunted by the Past"	Peter Andrikidis	Michelle Offen with Sherine Salama	3 January 2008
6	6	"The Hand of Friendship"	Peter Andrikidis	Kristen Dunphy	10 January 2008

=== Season 2 (2009) ===
No. overall	No. in season	Title	Directed by	Written by	Original release date	Viewers
7	1	"The Lost Boy"	Peter Andrikidis	Kristen Dunphy	13 October 2009	193,000
8	2	"A Prodigal Fear"	Peter Andrikidis	Kristen Dunphy and David Ogilvy	20 October 2009	154,000
9	3	"Just Cargo"	Peter Andrikidis	Michelle Offen	27 October 2009	141,000
10	4	"Ice in the Veins"	Peter Andrikidis	Michael Miller	3 November 2009	171,000
11	5	"Men of Conscience"	Peter Andrikidis	Vanessa Bates	10 November 2009	146,000
12	6	"Another Life"	Peter Andrikidis	Katherine Thomson	17 November 2009	138,000
13	7	"Atonement"	Peter Andrikidis	Michael Miller and Kristen Dunphy	24 November 2009	131,000

=== Season 3 (2011) ===
No. overall	No. in season	Title	Directed by	Written by	Original release date	Viewers
14	1	"The Hero's Standard"	Peter Andrikidis	Michael Miller	20 April 2011	259,000
15	2	"Heart of Darkness"	Peter Andrikidis	David Ogilvy	27 April 2011	243,000
16	3	"Jerusalem"	Peter Andrikidis	Katherine Thomson	4 May 2011	222,000
17	4	"The Transit of Venus"	Peter Andrikidis	Michael Miller	11 May 2011	178,000
18	5	"The Price of Salvation"	Peter Andrikidis	Michelle Offen	18 May 2011	220,000
19	6	"Behold a Pale Horse"	Peter Andrikidis	Vanessa Bates	25 May 2011	181,000
20	7	"Revelation"	Peter Andrikidis	Kris Wyld with Steve Knapman	1 June 2011	230,000
