= Catherine McCormack =

English actress (born 1972)

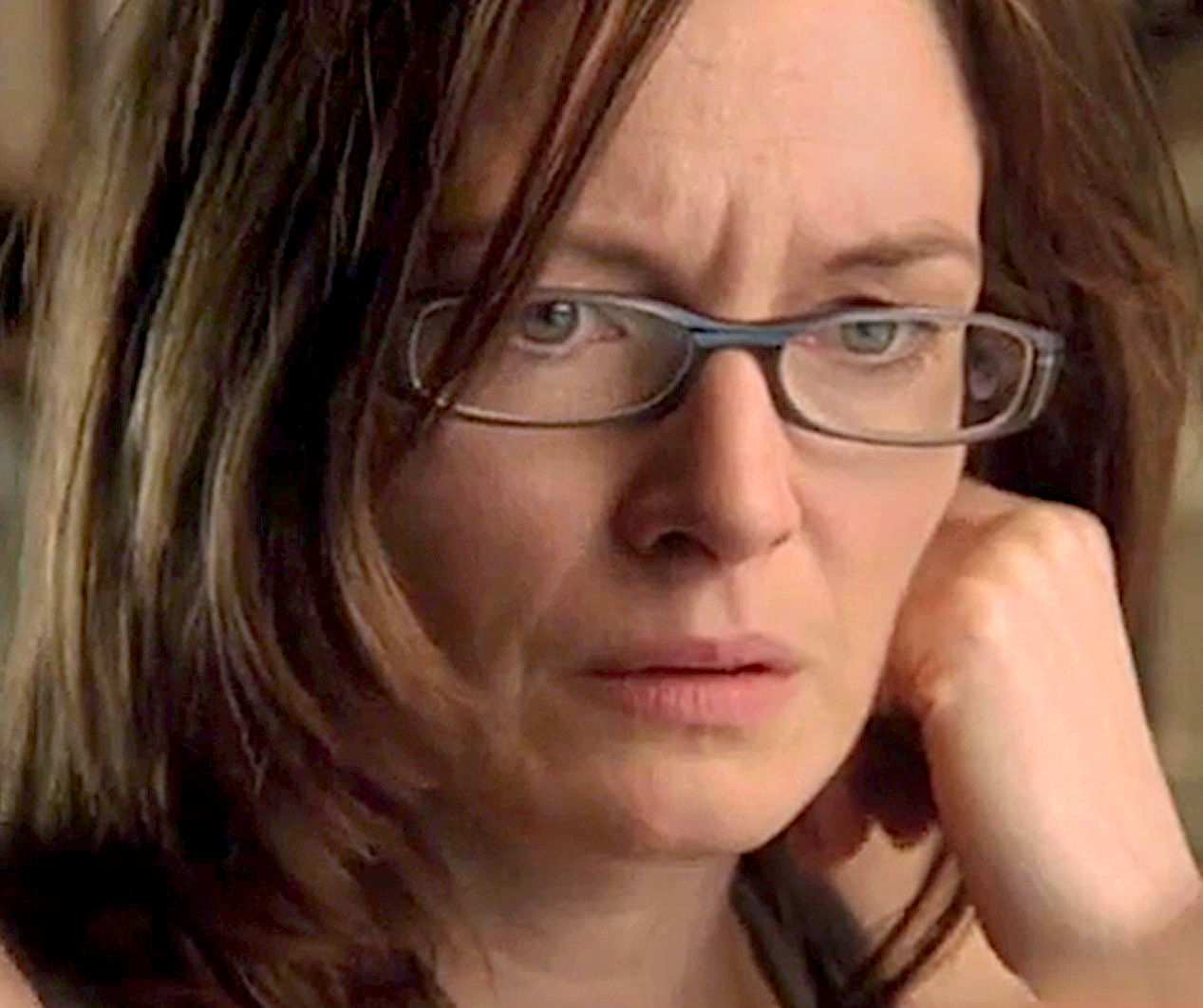
- McCormack in Midnight Man (2008)
- Born: Catherine Jane McCormack; 3 April 1972 (age 54); Epsom, Surrey, England
- Education: Oxford School of Drama
- Occupation: Actress
- Years active: 1994–present

Catherine Jane McCormack (born 3 April 1972) is an English actress. Her film appearances include Braveheart (1995), The Land Girls (1998), Dangerous Beauty (1998), Dancing at Lughnasa (1998), Spy Game (2001), and 28 Weeks Later (2007). Her theatre work includes National Theatre productions of All My Sons (2000) and Honour (2003).

== Early life ==
McCormack was born in Epsom, Surrey, England. One of her grandfathers was Irish. Her mother died of lupus when McCormack was six years old and her steelworker father subsequently raised her and her brother Stephen. She was brought up as Roman Catholic and attended the Convent of Our Lady of Providence. She went on to study at the Oxford School of Drama.

== Career ==
=== Film ===
McCormack's screen debut was as the lead in the film Loaded (1994), directed by Anna Campion. McCormack subsequently stated that she had a "miserable time with the director.... It was my first film job, I needed to be mollycoddled, I needed to be helped through it, and I wasn't. Mostly, it was a horrible experience." Her first important role was as Murron MacClannough in the multiple Academy Award-winning film Braveheart (1995).

After Braveheart, McCormack starred alongside Anna Friel and Rachel Weisz in David Leland's The Land Girls and had lead roles in Nils Gaup's Northstar and Marshall Herskovitz's Dangerous Beauty. Other films include Spy Game (2001) and 28 Weeks Later. In 1998, she stated that "I read very few scripts I'm passionate about... Maybe one in every twenty or thirty."

=== Theatre ===
McCormack has shown a preference in her career for the theatre, saying that "theatre really is an actor's medium: you're on stage with no director anymore, whereas in film very rarely do you get much rehearsal other than running through the scene very quickly. Then everyone comes in and shoots it." McCormack was one of the original 2006 London cast of Patrick Barlow's play of The 39 Steps. In 2008, she performed the role of Nora in A Doll's House, directed by Peter Hall at the Theatre Royal, Bath, and also the role of Isabel Archer in a stage adaptation of The Portrait of a Lady, both of which commenced their runs in July 2008, ending in August, before transferring to the Rose Theatre in Kingston later that year.

In 2009, she appeared in the British tour of Headlong's adaptation of Six Characters in Search of an Author. In 2012, she starred as Juana Inés de la Cruz in the Royal Shakespeare Company's production of Helen Edmundson's play The Heresy of Love.

== Personal life ==
As of 2009, McCormack was living with her boyfriend in Richmond.

== Acting credits ==
=== Film ===
Year	Title	Role	Notes
1994	Loaded	Rose	
1995	Braveheart	Murron MacClannough	
1996	North Star	Sarah	
1998	The Land Girls	Stella	
1998	Dangerous Beauty	Veronica Franco	
1998	Dancing at Lughnasa	Christina "Chrissy" Mundy	
1999	This Year's Love	Hannah	
1999	The Debtors		
2000	Shadow of the Vampire	Greta Schröder	
2000	A Rumor of Angels	Mary Neubauer	
2000	The Weight of Water	Jean Janes	
2000	Born Romantic	Jocelyn	
2001	The Tailor of Panama	Francesca Deane	
2001	Spy Game	Elizabeth Hadley	
2004	Strings	Zita (voice)	
2005	A Sound of Thunder	Sonia Rand	
2006	Renaissance	Bislane Tasuiev (voice)	
2007	The Moon and the Stars	Kristina Baumgarten / Tosca	
2007	28 Weeks Later	Alice Harris	
2013	The Fold	Rebecca Ashton	
2014	Magic in the Moonlight	Olivia	
2016	The Journey	Kate Elgar	
2017	Promise at Dawn	Lesley Blanch	
2019	The Song of Names	Helen	
2019	Cordelia	Kate	
2025	My Oxford Year	Antonia Davenport	Netflix film

=== Television ===
Year	Title	Role	Notes
1994	Wycliffe	Asenath Gardner	Episode: "The Scapegoat"
1997	Deacon Brodie	Annie Grant	TV film
1999	Love in the 21st Century	Fay	Episode: "Reproduction"
2001	Armadillo	Flavia	Main cast, miniseries
2003	Broken Morning	Kathy	TV film
2004	Gunpowder, Treason & Plot	Elizabeth I	TV film
2005	Kenneth Tynan: In Praise of Hardcore	Kathleen Tynan	TV film
2006	Elizabeth David: A Life in Recipes	Elizabeth David	TV film
2006	Ancient Rome: The Rise and Fall of an Empire	Poppaea Sabina	Episode: "Nero"
2008	Midnight Man	Alice Ross	Main cast, miniseries
2011	Lights Out	Theresa Leary	Main cast
2013	Lucan	Veronica	Main cast, miniseries
2015	Life in Squares	Virginia Woolf	Main cast, miniseries
2016	Sherlock	Lady Carmichael	Episode "The Abominable Bride"
2017	Genius	Marija Ružić–Marić	Recurring role (season 1)
2018	Women on the Verge	Claire	4 episodes
2019–2021	Temple	Beth Milton	Main cast
2022	Slow Horses	Alex Tropper	Recurring role (series 2)
2023	The Witcher	Anika	Episode: "Reunion"
2025	Lockerbie: A Search for Truth	Jane Swire	
2026	A Thousand Blows	Sophie Lyons	Series 2

=== Theatre ===
Year	Title	Role	Venue or Company
1999	Anna Weiss	Anna Weiss	Whitehall Theatre
2000	All My Sons	Ann	National Theatre
2001	A Lie of the Mind	Beth	Donmar Warehouse
2001	Kiss Me Like You Mean It	Ruth	Soho Theatre
2001	White Horses	Paula	Gate Theatre, Dublin
2002	Free	Sophie	National Theatre
2002	Dinner	Sian	National Theatre
2003	Honour	Claudia	National Theatre
2003	Under the Curse	Iphigenia	Gate Theatre, London
2004	Vermillion Dream	Miriam	Salisbury Playhouse
2006	The 39 Steps	Various	Tricycle Theatre
2007	The Lady from Dubuque	Jo	Theatre Royal Haymarket
2008	A Doll's House	Nora	Theatre Royal Haymarket
2008	The Portrait of a Lady	Isabel Archer	Theatre Royal Haymarket
2009	Six Characters in Search of an Author		
2012	The Heresy of Love	Juana Inés de la Cruz	Royal Shakespeare Company
