= Loaded (1994 film) =

1994 British mystery thriller drama film by Anna Campion

- Directed by: Anna Campion
- Written by: Anna Campion
- Produced by: David Hazlett; Caroline Hewitt; Bridget Ikin; John Maynard
- Starring: Thandiwe Newton; Catherine McCormack
- Cinematography: Alan Almond
- Edited by: John Gilbert
- Music by: Simon Fisher Turner
- Distributed by: Miramax Films
- Release date: September 4, 1994 (Venice)
- Running time: 104 minutes 105 minutes
- Countries: United Kingdom; New Zealand
- Language: English

Loaded is a 1994 mystery thriller drama film written and directed by Anna Campion and starring Thandiwe Newton and Catherine McCormack.

== Cast ==
- Oliver Milburn as Neil
- Nick Patrick as Giles
- Catherine McCormack as Rose
- Thandie Newton as Zita
- Mathew Eggleton as Lionel
- Danny Cunningham as Lance
- Biddy Hodson as Charlotte
- Dearbhla Molloy as Therapist
- Caleb Lloyd as Young Neil
- Joe Gecks as Brother on Bike

== Production ==
Of her experience with this film, McCormack said in a 2006 interview with The Independent: “Basically, I had a miserable time with the director [Anna Campion](…)It was my first film job, I needed to be mollycoddled, I needed to be helped through it, and I wasn't. Mostly, it was a horrible experience.”

== Release ==
The film premiered at the Venice Film Festival on September 4, 1994.

== Reception ==
The film has a 17% rating on Rotten Tomatoes based on six reviews.

Derek Elley of Variety gave the film a negative review and wrote, "Weakly scripted, lacklusterly acted tale of a bunch of young, disillusioned Brits flounders around as much as its characters. Commercial chances look grim." Janet Maslin of The New York Times also gave the film a negative review and wrote, "Unfortunately, Loaded gives way to indulgent dithering long before such elements create any cumulative effect."

Erin Richter of Entertainment Weekly also gave the film a negative review and wrote, “What starts as an intriguing, intricately woven study of seven angst-filled filmmakers loses its shape within the final 20 minutes.” Kevin Thomas of the Los Angeles Times gave the film a positive review and wrote, "The result is a superbly acted film of terrific density and immediacy; it’s thick with feelings, both expressed and repressed, and it evokes a strong sense of the ultimate ambiguity of human nature and behavior."
