= North Star (1996 film) =

1996 film

- Theatrical release poster
- Directed by: Nils Gaup
- Screenplay by: Sergio Donati; Lorenzo Donati; Paul Ohl
- Story by: Gilles Behat; Phillipe Schwartz; Marc Pecas
- Based on: The North Star; 1956 novel by Henry Wilson Allen
- Produced by: Anne Francois
- Starring: James Caan; Christopher Lambert; Catherine McCormack; Burt Young; Jacques Francois
- Cinematography: Bruno de Keyzer
- Edited by: Kant Pan; Michael A. Hoey
- Music by: Bruce Rowland
- Production companies: Regency Enterprises; M6; Monarchy Enterprises; Canal+; Eurimages
- Distributed by: Warner Bros.
- Release date: October 20, 1996 (United States)
- Running time: 88 minutes
- Country: United States
- Language: English
- Budget: $18 million

North Star is a 1996 American Western film starring James Caan, Christopher Lambert and Catherine McCormack. Directed by Nils Gaup, it was written by Sergio Donati and loosely based on Henry Wilson Allen's 1956 Western novel The North Star. Lambert executive produced the film.

== Plot summary ==
At the beginning of the Nome Gold Rush in 1899, Sean McLennon, a Scots-Irish-American land baron, owns the majority of property titles surrounding Nome and declares that only American citizens are legally entitled to placer claims. He uses power, influence and nationalism to make local politics and law enforcement work in his favor. Unbeknownst to those outside of McLennon's gang, the original owners of the land were all killed on McLennon's orders.

The gang's latest target, Hudson Santeek narrowly escapes the attempt on his life but not before witnessing McLennon's right-hand thug, Reno murder Santeek's adoptive father - an elderly Athabaskan tribal chief - in cold blood. Santeek, who is half white and half American Indian, had "purchased" his surrogate family's land in a bid to keep miners away.

Santeek returns to Nome to confront McLennon at knifepoint in his bedroom, but Sarah McLennon's young Irish immigrant trophy wife, intervenes at gunpoint; McLennon disarms Santeek and the two engage in a fight. After Santeek floors McLennon, he kidnaps Sarah, steals a dogsled and rides off into the Alaskan wilderness. Without the permission of the local sheriff, McLennon forms a posse and treks out into the tundra to kill Santeek and rescue his wife.

On the course of the journey, Santeek talks to his captive about her husband's murderous property deed scams, but she does not immediately believe him and re-avows her loyalty to her husband. However, when McLennon and his men locate Santeek's cabin hideout and shoot at it indiscriminately, Sarah pleas for her husband not to kill her abductor. McLennon notices that she is wearing a shirt made of animal skin that Santeek had given to her earlier to keep her warm. He erroneously assumes that she betrayed him and had an affair with Santeek. Calling her a "whore," he disowns her and orders his men to continue firing at Santeek's cabin.

Santeek escapes while his pet wolf fatally lunges at the throat of one of the posse gunmen. Santeek's wolf then attacks the gang's sled dogs, but Reno shoots and kills the animal. With no clear objective and unfamiliarity with the freezing, unpredictable terrain, members of McLennon's posse begin to turn on one another, but McLennon kills the burnouts in his gang and sets out to finish the job he started.

Meanwhile, back in Nome, Col. Henry Johnson and the U.S. Marshals begin their own investigation of McLennon's land seizures, noticing that all of the original trustees are mysteriously deceased and that Santeek (the most recent disseisee) was witnessed in town alive. On the basis of this discrepancy, the federals declare Martial Law on Nome and accompany the town's top lawman, Sheriff Lamont to bring McLennon and Santeek back for questioning. The enforcers locate McLennon and his gang, but McLennon refuses to obey their orders and the posse shoot Lamont and the other officials to death.

McLennon and the surviving members of his gang eventually track and corner Santeek in a glacier cave. While Santeek scuffles with Reno, McLennon tips over a wood totem and Reno and Santeek slide down and fall through the sheath of a frozen lake. Reno drowns during the struggle, while Santeek, with his naturalist survival skills, makes it out of the icy water alive.

Once again thinking that Santeek is dead, McLennon returns to Nome alone and conducts another town speech, reaffirming his mining policies to the chagrin of immigrant prospectors and the delight of his cronies. However, Johnson and the U.S. Marshals interrupt the huddle and arrest McLennon for the murder of sheriff Lamont and the other constables. Sarah, McLennon's disillusioned wife, had witnessed the massacre and ultimately informed on him.

Soon after, Santeek returns to town to settle scores with the incarcerated McLennon, but finds the former had escaped from his cell and slit the throats of the jailguards in the process. McLennon breaks into his loft apartment (above the saloon which he had owned) and attempts to kill Sarah for turning on him, but Santeek appears behind McLennon and plunges a dagger into his back.

== Cast ==
- James Caan as Sean McLennon
- Christopher Lambert as Hudson Saanteek
- Catherine McCormack as Sarah
- Burt Young as Reno
- Morten Faldaas as Smiley
- Jacques François as Col. Henry Johnson
- Mary M. Walker as Haina
- Renny Hoalona Loren as Cheelik
- Frank Salsedo as Nakki
- Reidar Sørensen as Bjorn Svenson
- Hilde Grythe as Hannah Svenson
- Sverre Anker Ousdal as Lindberg
- Nicholas Hope as Sheriff Lamont
- Frank Krog as Big Tim
- Norman Charles as Tonga

== Production ==
Although set in the U.S. state of Alaska, the movie was shot entirely in Norway in Maridalen, Møsvatn, and Orre bach.
