= All My Friends Are Racist =

Australian drama television miniseries

- Genre: Comedy; Drama; Crime
- Created by: Enoch Mailangi
- Written by: Enoch Mailangi; Kodie Bedford
- Directed by: Bjorn Stewart
- Starring: Davey Thompson; Tuuli Narkle
- Country of origin: Australia
- Original language: English
- No. of series: 1
- No. of episodes: 5

Production
- Producers: Liliana Munoz; Deborah Glover
- Cinematography: Shing Fung Cheung
- Running time: 15 minutes

Original release
- Network: ABC
- Release: 24 August 2021

All My Friends Are Racist is an Australian comedy television miniseries. Created by Enoch Mailangi and directed by Bjorn Stewart it starred Davey Thompson and Tuuli Narkle as two friends who run in to difficulties after exposing their friends’ racism. It was developed from Mailangi's winning entry in RAW, a competition for young indigenous filmmakers.

== Cast ==
- Davey Thompson as Casey
- Tuuli Narkle as Belle
- Elizabeth Cullen as Celia
- Thomas Weatherall as Luke
- Wollie Gela as Liam
- Leah Purcell as Justice Janelle Ray AO

== Reception ==
Writing in Screen Hub Raelee Lancaster gave it four stars. She writes "The humour in All My Friends Are Racist comes from the series’ ability to lean into the absurd while remaining incredibly self-aware. It doesn’t take itself seriously, poking fun at both itself and its audience." Glen Humphries of the Canberra Times says "every single character who appears is a figure of fun. No one is off-limits. It's all quite outrageous - and very funny."

== Awards ==
- 11th AACTA Awards
  - Best Short Form Comedy – Enoch Mailangi, Kodie Bedford, Bjorn Stewart, Liliana Munoz - won
