= Mullet (film) =

2001 Australian film by David Caesar

- 2001 VHS cover
- Directed by: David Caesar
- Written by: David Caesar
- Produced by: Vincent Sheehan
- Starring: Ben Mendelsohn; Susie Porter
- Cinematography: Bob Humphreys
- Edited by: Mark Perry
- Music by: Paul Healy
- Production companies: Porchlight Films; Showtime Australia
- Release date: 28 June 2001 (Australia)
- Running time: 89 minutes
- Country: Australia
- Language: English
- Budget: $1 million
- Box office: $1.5 million approx.

Mullet is an Australian film released in 2001, written and directed by David Caesar, and starring Ben Mendelsohn, Susie Porter and Andrew Gilbert.

== Plot summary ==
In the film, Eddie returns to his home town on the south coast of New South Wales. Having left for the city without explanation three years ago, he tries to pick up the pieces of his life and fit back into the lives of those he left, including his ex-girlfriend Tully and brother Pete. The title of the film comes from Eddie's nickname and from his attempts to make a living poaching mullet.

== Cast ==
Actor	Character
Ben Mendelsohn	Eddie 'Mullet' Maloney
Susie Porter	Tully
Andrew Gilbert	Peter Maloney
Belinda McClory	Kay
Tony Barry	Col Maloney
Kris McQuade	Gwen Maloney
Peta Brady	Robbie
Wayne Blair	James
Paul Kelman	Gary
Steve Le Marquand	Jones
Aaron Blabey	Terry
Jim Webb	Big Bloke
Nash Edgerton	Winger
Bryan Brown	Publican (voice)

== Production ==
The film is based on a short story written by Caesar, who grew up on the South Coast of New South Wales. It was shot mostly in Kiama over four weeks in June 2000, with a budget of approximately A$1 million. From conception to completion, the process of making Mullet took eight years.

Filming locations include Chapman Oval at Blowhole Point, the fish shop at Kiama Harbour, Kiama Police Station and Seven Mile Beach. Originally, producer Vincent Sheehan had intended to shoot interiors in Sydney, but found the cost of doing so was prohibitive within the film's budget.

Cameos include Bryan Brown as the voice of the never-seen publican, Steve Starling as a mullet wrangler and Australian rugby league player Mick Cronin on the steps of his Cronin’s Hotel in the town of Gerringong. The Kiama Knights rugby league club were also involved in production.

== Awards and nominations ==
AFI Awards, 2001

- Nominated: Best Actor
- Nominated: Best Supporting Actor
- Nominated: Best Supporting Actress
- Nominated: Best Director
- Nominated: Best Original Screenplay

Australian Screen Sound Guild, 2001

- Won: Best Achievement in Sound for a Feature Film – Dialogue & ADR Editing

Australian Writers' Guild, 2001

- Won: Awgie Award – Feature Film – Original

Film Critics Circle of Australia Awards, 2001

- Won: Best Screenplay – Original
- Won: Best Supporting Actor – Male
- Nominated: Best Actor – Male
- Nominated: Best Director
- Nominated: Best Film
- Nominated: Best Supporting Actor – Female

Shanghai International Film Festival, 2001

- Won: Best Director

== Box office ==
Mullet grossed approximately $1.5 million at the box office in Australia.

== See also ==
- Cinema of Australia
