= Nick Patrick (actor) =

British actor

Nick Patrick is a British actor, best known for playing the part of SRO (Station Reception Officer) Julian 'JT' Tavell, in the ITV police procedural The Bill from 2005 to 2006. He also played the killer, Hamish Endicott in Prime Suspect, Season 4 "Inner Circles".

Nick grew up in Whitstable, Kent. As a teenager he appeared in the short film Dead Cat directed by David Lewis and part funded by Derek Jarman, partly shot at Prospect Cottage, Dungeness, also starred Genesis P-Orridge with the soundtrack by Psychic TV. He played the lead in Bad Baby, written and directed by Duncan Roy at the Penny Theatre, Canterbury.

He trained at the Drama Centre London. His TV credits include Cadfael, Kavanagh QC, Rough Justice, Hollyoaks, The Courtroom and Emmerdale.

Theatre credits include The Grapes of Wrath directed by Michael Rudman at the Crucible Sheffield, Single Spies directed by Michael Simpson at the Watford Palace, and Jonathan Kemp's The Razorblade Cuckoo directed by Bob Wolstenholme at the Holborn Centre for Performing Arts.

Films include Loaded directed by Anna Campion, and Two Days Nine Lives directed by Simon Monjack. Nick has collaborated on two further shorts with Anna Campion, Inertia and Bipolar.

He recently completed Paul Kindersley's latest feature film "The Burning Baby" and is currently working on a film project "L'homme au Foyer", started 10 years ago, filming 2 weeks every summer.
