= NCIS: Sydney =

Australian military action television series

- Genre: Police procedural; Military action drama
- Created by: Morgan O'Neill
- Based on: NCIS franchise by: Donald P. Bellisario; Don McGill
- Directed by: Shawn Seet; David Caesar; Kriv Stenders; Catherine Millar
- Starring: Olivia Swann; Todd Lasance; Sean Sagar; Tuuli Narkle; Mavournee Hazel; William McInnes
- Theme music composer: Numeriklab; Maria Alfonsine; Damian de Boos-Smith
- Opening theme: "NCIS Theme"
- Ending theme: "NCIS Theme"
- Composer: Roger Mason
- Country of origin: Australia
- Original language: English
- No. of seasons: 3
- No. of episodes: 38

Production
- Executive producers: Morgan O'Neill; Sara Richardson; Sue Seeary
- Producer: Michele Bennett
- Cinematography: Geoffrey Hall; Carolyn Constantine
- Camera setup: Multi-camera
- Running time: 43 minutes
- Production company: Endemol Shine Australia

Original release
- Network: Paramount+ Network 10
- Release: 10 November 2023 – present

Related
- NCIS; NCIS: Los Angeles; NCIS: New Orleans; NCIS: Hawaiʻi; NCIS: Origins; NCIS: Tony & Ziva; NCIS: New York

NCIS: Sydney is an Australian military police procedural series and is a spin-off of NCIS and its franchise. It was created as the first spin-off outside the United States, and follows a fictional task force of special agents from the Naval Criminal Investigative Service (NCIS) and Australian Federal Police (AFP) officers working together on investigations involving American military personnel. The series features Australian actors and producers and stars Olivia Swann, Todd Lasance, Sean Sagar, Tuuli Narkle, Mavournee Hazel and William McInnes.

NCIS: Sydney premiered on 10 November 2023 on Paramount+ in Australia. A second season premiered on 7 February 2025. In February 2025, the series was renewed for a third season, which premiered on Paramount+ on 14 October 2025. In January 2026, it was renewed for a fourth season.

== Cast ==
=== Main ===
- Olivia Swann as Michelle Mackey, Naval Criminal Investigative Service (NCIS) Supervisory Special Agent (SSA) and Team Leader
- Todd Lasance as Sergeant Jim "JD" Dempsey, Australian Federal Police (AFP) Second-in-Command
- Sean Sagar as DeShawn Anthony Jackson, NCIS Special Agent (SA)
- Tuuli Narkle as Constable Evie Cooper, AFP Liaison Officer
- Mavournee Hazel as Bluebird "Blue" Gleeson, AFP forensic scientist
- William McInnes as Roy "Rosie" Penrose, AFP forensic pathologist

=== Recurring ===
- Lewis Fitz-Gerald as Richard Rankin, DoD attache and a U.S. Colonel
- Bert LaBonté as Ken Carter, NCIS Special Agent in Charge (SAC) and the team's special counselor
- Claude Jabbour as Travis 'Trigger' Riggs
- Noah Eid as Trey Mackey, Agent Mackey's son

=== Guests ===
- Arky Michael as Russian Orthodox Priest
- Benjamin Rigby as Hansie Dekker
- Conrad Coleby as Lieutenant Commander Lee
- Daniela Farinacci as Foreign Minister Quinn
- Dustin Clare as Kane / Porter
- Georgina Haig as Ana Niemus / Monica Rowe
- Jake Ryan as Nails
- Kate Jenkinson as Rebecca Dempsey
- Lex Marinos as Dimi
- Linal Haft as Frank Doherty
- Matt Holmes as FBI Special Agent in Charge Walter Cummins
- Matt Nable as Detective Sergeant Daniel Skelton
- Nathan Phillips as Finn
- Nicholas Brown as Quarter Master Rennie
- Rebecca Gibney as AFP Forensic Pathologist Nia Williams
- Richard Huggett as Assessor
- Tiriel Mora as Theo Blainey
- Frederick Du Rietz as Kyle Hadden

== Episodes ==
Series	Episodes	Originally released	
Series	Episodes	First released	Last released
1	8	10 November 2023	29 December 2023
2	10	7 February 2025	11 April 2025
3	20	14 October 2025	12 May 2026

=== Season 1 (2023) ===
No. overall	No. in season	Title	Directed by	Written by	Original release date
1	1	"Gone Fission"	Shawn Seet	Morgan O'Neill	10 November 2023
During an AUKUS ceremony at Sydney Harbour, a US Navy sailor dies of radiation poisoning, resulting in USS Ronald Reagan NCIS Special Agents Michelle Mackey and DeShawn Jackson partnering up with their Australian Federal Police counterparts, Sergeant Jim "JD" Dempsey and Constable Evie Cooper, with assistance from AFP scientist Bluebird Gleeson and Roy Penrose, a Forensic Pathologist with the AFP, to investigate. During their investigation, the team question a peace activist, who is cleared of wrongdoing. They also find another dead US naval officer, who was killed by a mysterious woman. While attempting to enter a nuclear-powered US submarine, they are attacked by a group of deep cover infiltrators, who were seeking to steal classified intelligence from the US Navy. Following a firefight, the surviving infiltrators are killed when their boat explodes in a remote-detonated explosion. Following the incident, a joint NCIS/AFP task force is created to facilitate cooperation between the US and Australian officers.
2	2	"Snakes in the Grass"	Shawn Seet	Written by : Michael Miller & Morgan O'Neill; Story by : Stuart Page	17 November 2023
The team investigate when a Navy compliance officer is found dead in a waterhole, leading them to begin uncovering the origin of the rare, deadly taipan which is uncommon to the area. During their investigation, Jackson and Cooper discover the taipan was part of a group of animals stolen from a pet shop. Mackey and Dempsey investigate the US Navy depot in Sydney and uncover an animal smuggling operation involving staff members and a corrupt US Navy officer. Jackson also discovers that the Navy compliance officer had infiltrated the smuggling ring but had been killed by his associates after learning he was a mole. Jackson and Cooper discover that the pet shop owner is part of the smuggling operation and are captured by her criminal associates. They are rescued by Mackey and Dempsey. Gleeson also adopts a rescued budgerigar as her pet.
3	3	"Brothers in Arms"	David Caesar	Andrew Anastasios	24 November 2023
When a shark spits out an arm that's wearing US Navy equipment, the team investigate a trio of former Navy divers, who have established a diving instruction business in Sydney. Penrose and Gleeson discover that the arm belonged to a former SEAL, PFC Coleman, who was a business partner of the former Navy divers. During the investigation, Gleeson discovers that an unmanned underwater vehicle (UUV) was present in the location where Coleman perished. The team discovers that the divers stole the UUV's data chip and that drugs were planted in their store to blackmail them into returning the stolen chip. One of the divers confesses to killing the murder victim, while the team use the other two to lead them to the buyer seeking to reclaim the drone footage. The buyer is quickly detained by Department of Defense Attache Colonel Rankin, who blocks the group's investigation. After Gleeson learns that the drugs planted in the divers' store originated from a ceased DEA bust, Mackey blackmails Rankin into letting the remaining divers go in return for not leaking evidence suggesting that the Central Intelligence Agency was spying on the Royal Australian Navy. Jackson and the others formally initiate Gleeson as a full member of the team.
4	4	"Ghosted"	Kriv Stenders	Tamara Asmar	1 December 2023
When US Petty Officer Eddie Backer is found dead in the historic the Rocks area, the team investigate with a decades-old Navy Cross medal giving them a motive for the death and sending them on a race to catch a killer. The suspect is Frank Doherty, a US Navy seaman and Vietnam War veteran, who went AWOL in 1971 and married his Australian girlfriend Mei Koo. Though Mackey is convinced of his guilt, Dempsey and Penrose discover evidence clearing Doherty. During the investigation, the team discover that Backer was attempting to repatriate the Navy Cross medal to Doherty. Jackson also learns that a third man was seen entering the building where Backer was thrown from. The murderer is exposed as Armen Standish, a curator at the Royal Australian Navy Heritage Centre, who was attempting to extort money from Doherty and Mei Koo. The team find a loophole around Doherty's desertion charge by arranging his marriage to Mei Koo.
5	5	"Doggieccino Day Afternoon"	David Caesar	Michael Miller	8 December 2023
While visiting a local dog cafe with his dog, Penrose and the other patrons are taken hostage by 15-year old Louie, who robbed a bank in order to obtain money for her cancer-stricken sister Casey. In addition to wearing a fake bomb vest, Louie also livestreams the hostage incident. The NCIS team joins the Australian police response to the hostage crisis. Dempsey clashes with Detective Sergeant Cath Welsh, who is willing to use lethal force to end the hostage situation. Penrose uses diplomacy to reason with the troubled Louie. Jackson and Mackey visit Louie's mother Fiona and Casey while Gleeson analyses Louie's social media profile. The team discover that a criminal named Stone had instigated the bank robbery, planted a hidden bomb inside Louie's vest and that Fiona was originally going to wear the bomb vest. When Louie questions Stone's plan, he kidnaps Casey. Jackson, Mackey and Cooper manage to track down his whereabouts, rescuing Casey and confronting Stone, who attempts to detonate the bomb, but Dempsey and Welsh are able to jam Stone's signal before he can do so. Stone is ultimately shot and killed by Mackey, while the police disarm Louie's hidden bomb. Following the hostage crisis, Penrose visits his dementia-strickened wife, who is residing in her rest home.
6	6	"Extraction"	Catherine Millar	James Cripps & Clare Sladden	15 December 2023
While on a crowded bus in Bondi, a man wearing a US Navy jacket dies of a cocaine overdose. Dr Penrose identifies the man as Robert Goddard, who works as a cook for the Peruvian drug syndicate Ramos Cartel. The resulting investigation sends Cooper looking back into her past as an undercover narcotics officer with the AFP. Evie is contacted by AFP undercover narcotics officer Kane, who has infiltrated the Ramos Cartel. Evie ghosts her NCIS colleagues during her undercover work. Mackey and Dempsey contact Cooper's former superior Detective Dan Skelton of the State Drug Squad, who briefs them on the case. The team also seek out Petty Officer Leeson, who sold the jacket to Goddard, but find him dead inside a warehouse. With Ramos Cartel's boss El Maestro due to visit Sydney, the cartel members including the undercover Cooper and Kane cook a batch of drugs. Mackey, Jackson and Dempsey raid the drug laboratory and confront the criminals. Mackey also encounters Skelton, who is revealed to be secretly working for the cartel and framed Kane for Goddard's murder. Skelton and one of the criminals is killed during an explosion that destroys the drug lab. After arresting El Maestro, Mackey reconciles with Cooper.
7	7	"Bunker Down"	Kriv Stenders	Kim Ho & James Cripps	22 December 2023
Just before the agents of the NCIS team were scheduled to attend a glitzy AI tech launch event hosted by GaiaMetric in a secret underground World War Two-era bunker, Dr Howie Sutcliffe, a researcher with the US Navy, is found dead. Dempsey and Jackson investigate the murder, while Mackey, Cooper and Gleeson go to the bunker. The event is sabotaged, trapping the guests—including the killer—with just two hours' worth of oxygen. Mackey, Evie and Bluebird search for a way out of the bunker while Dempsey, Jackson and Penrose race to find them. The staff are unable to unlock the bunker due to a technological malfunction. JD and DeShawn discover evidence that Dr Sutcliff's invitation medal was stolen by the killer. They visit GaiaMetric's headquarters but discover that none of the staff know where the bunker is. Mackey and her team managed to find an old copper wire that allows them to temporarily contact Dempsey and Jackson. Mackey and Cooper also encounter an apparently pregnant journalist named Monica Rowe. Mackey and her team attempt to find exits but discover they have been sealed. With Penrose's help and information provided by Gleeson, Dempsey and Jackson manage to locate the bunker minutes before the oxygen runs out. Cooper and Mackey discover that Monica is the murderer and had masterminded the sabotage. After taking her into custody, the team recognise her as Xena, who was part of the team that infiltrated the nuclear submarine USS Navajo.
8	8	"Blonde Ambition"	Catherine Millar	Morgan O'Neill	29 December 2023
Dempsey's nine year-old son Jack is kidnapped by an international assassin posing as a clown. He wants to exchange Jack for Xena (aka Ana Niemus), the mercenary in their custody. The NCIS team and Australian police track the stolen clown's van to a carpark but finds that it has been booby trapped. Inside, they find the remains of the real clown, who has conifers on his hands. Using this evidence, Gleeson deduces that the kidnapper, Yaroslav Utkin, is a devoted Russian Orthodox believer. With the FBI heading to Sydney to arrest Niemus, JD escapes with her and meet up with Utkin to arrange the hostage swap. Utkin, however, reveals that Jack's kidnapping was a ploy to lure Niemus out in order to kill her. Before Utkin can kill Dempsey and Jack, Niemus releases herself from her handcuffs, as JD had actually unlocked them earlier and kills him. Niemus then departs in the clown truck but, before leaving, she gives Dempsey a smartphone to call someone for help. When Dempsey dials the number, Mackey learns the number belongs to Colonel Rankin, ending the episode on a cliffhanger.

=== Season 2 (2025) ===
No. overall	No. in season	Title	Directed by	Written by	Original release date
9	1	"Heart Starter"	Jennifer Leacey	Morgan O'Neill	7 February 2025
Mackey confronts Colonel Rankin but he collapses after an apparent heart attack. For allowing Niemus to escape, Mackey and Dempsey are suspended from active duty by NCIS Special Agent Ken Carter and the AFP respectively. Jackson is placed in charge of the NCIS team. During the course of their investigation, Penrose discovers that the comatose Rankin was fitted with a pacemaker that doubled as a listening device which was remotely detonated when he tried to expose the people he was working for. While analyzing his bank transactions, Penrose finds that Rankin was working for an unidentified party who had hired Utkin to assassinate Niemus. Mackey and Dempsey secretly assist their colleagues and discover that Niemus had triggered Rankin's heart attack. Niemus attempts to kill Rankin but is lured into a trap and captured by Dempsey and Mackey. Following Niemus' capture, Dempsey and Mackey are reinstated in the NCIS team. While the comatose Rankin is officially declared dead, the NCIS team resolve to find the true mastermind.
10	2	"Fire in the Hole"	Jennifer Leacey	Andrew Anastasios	14 February 2025
The NCIS team investigate the body of a man that was found in Sydney Harbour. They discover that the man was scheduled to attend an upcoming wedding on a sailing ship in the Harbour. Cooper and Jackson get aboard the ship disguised as a marriage celebrant and photographer. Meanwhile, Dempsey and Mackey raid a Sydney address, where they discover the homeowner had been stockpiling explosives in his bunker. The ship is hijacked by a group of Australian terrorists, who threaten to kill hostages in order to force the United States to leave Australia. Cooper is captured while Jackson is thrown overboard but manages to cling to the stern. Cooper and Jackson manage to free the wedding party, who overpower their captors. Mackey manages to convince the captain of a US Navy warship not to open fire on the hijacked ship, thus averting a potential crisis that would have played into the terrorists' objectives.
11	3	"Back in the USSR"	Catherine Millar	Written by : James Cripps; Story by : James Cripps & Clare Sladden	21 February 2025
The NCIS team investigate the body of a US Navy officer named Lieutenant Harvey Wilson, who was found inside a concrete slab. During the course of their investigation, they discover that Wilson was an undercover US intelligence officer feeding false intelligence to the Soviets' about the US missile programme during the 1980s. Australian Security Intelligence Organisation Agent Terry Barnes, who is an old friend of Penrose, is assigned to assist with the NCIS team. While investigating a former Russian agent, Mackey and Dempsey discover the man was poisoned with a nerve agent and narrowly escape death. The NCIS team later discover that Barnes was secretly working for the Russian Consul-General Lina Bukovska, who was then working as a KGB agent. Before they can apprehend Barnes, he is poisoned with a nerve agent by Bukovska. Penrose finds a remorseful Barnes, who confesses that he was spying for the KGB to get medicine for his dying wife. He also identifies Bukovska as Wilson's murderer. Though Bukovska claims diplomatic immunity, the NCIS team and Australian authorities manage to convince her to cooperate in exchange for avoiding extradition to Russia after revealing that the intelligence about the US missile programme was faulty.
12	4	"Truth Sabre"	Catherine Millar	Tamara Asmar	28 February 2025
The NCIS team is dispatched to investigate a car bombing outside the residence of Commander Kira Mason, who is in charge of a classified computer security program for the US Navy. Widowed, the workaholic Mason has an estranged relationship with her teenage daughter Grace, who is influenced by a network of online conspiracy theorists. Jackson and Cooper are tasked with watching over the Mason household. During their investigation, Mackey and Dempsey discover that Grace's boyfriend Jake is an AI-created character who is being operated by nefarious forces seeking to steal classified information from the US military. The NCIS team discover that Kira's engineer Gene was responsible for the bombing but find that he was murdered. Under the manipulation of the mysterious mastermind, Grace hacks into her mother's computer and downloads classified information relating to US Navy SEALs. She meets up with the mastermind, who turns out to be Kira's chief of staff Heather. Heather attempts to kidnap Grace but is thwarted by Mackey. Following Heather's arrest, Grace reconciles with her mother.
13	5	"Shucked"	David Caesar	Ella Cook & Michael Miller	7 March 2025
The NCIS team investigate the death of US Navy petty officer Reuben Daniels, whose frozen body was found by a beach. Penrose and Gleeson discover that Daniels' body was covered in abalone semen. During their investigation, Mackey and Dempsey discover that Daniels and his flatmate Craig were involved in an abalone smuggling ring. After discovering a photo of Daniels' Vietnamese girlfriend Kim Dang, Cooper and Jackson investigate the Rezzy's strip club, whose Vietnamese strippers have been ensnared into a sex trafficking ring. Jackson meets Kim Dang, who reveals that she is searching for her sister who had disappeared after her student visa expired. The NCIS team converge on Craig meeting with the Rezzy's manager's henchmen. Mackey convinces Craig not to kill the henchmen, who lead Police to the missing strippers including Kim's sister. The team celebrate Gleeson's birthday following the investigation.
14	6	"Hell Weak"	David Caesar	Michael Miller	14 March 2025
The NCIS team investigates the death of US Navy SEAL Lieutenant Pete Levinson, who was staying at an outdoor fitness camp run by former SEALS including Chief Finn McKay. McKay had retired following a tragic training accident in California, which claimed the life of trainee Victor Austin. During scene examination, Jackson and Cooper determine that Levinson was murdered and that his death was staged to look like a suicide by hanging. Meanwhile, Penrose, Gleeson, Mackey and Dempsey discover that Levinson had been investigating a steroid smuggling ring among the SEALS. Jackson and Cooper are later taken prisoner by two of McKay's former SEAL associates, who are implicated in the smuggling operation. Jackson convinces the smugglers to play a game of hunt and seek instead of shooting them. With the help of McKay, the NCIS team overpower the two SEAL associates. The team resolves to continue their investigation into the smuggling ring.
15	7	"Breathless"	Jennifer Leacey	Michael Miller & James Cripps	21 March 2025
Gleeson is attending a concert featuring her favourite pop star Nova Sykes when US Navy Petty Officer Sally Poole, whom she is performing with, dies after the smoke machine malfunctions. During their investigation, the NCIS team discover that someone had added peanut oil to the smoke machine and tampered with the micro-needle patch used to inject Poole. Mackey and Dempsey question obsessed Nova fan Cassie Hayes but rule her out as a suspect. Against protocol, Gleeson investigates Nova and her manager father Jeff Sykes while befriending Nova, discovering that Sykes exploits his daughter as a cash cow and keeps her drugged. After detaining Nova's head of security Toran, the NCIS discover evidence incriminating Sykes for Poole's murder. Gleeson rescues Nova but Sykes attempts to kill her by staging a suicide, but is thwarted when Gleeson manages to wound Sykes, who is then arrested for his crimes. The NCIS team celebrate with Gleeson.
16	8	"Blood Is Thicker Than Vodka"	Jennifer Leacey	Andrew Anastasios	28 March 2025
The NCIS team investigate the death of US Navy Petty Officer Third Class Ezra Stokes, who was found drained of his blood inside a coffin in Sydney Harbour. Mackey and Dempsey investigate self proclaimed "vampire" Dawn Lazar, her son Nicholai and their manservant Atticus. Dawn and Nicholai run a coffin company that produced the coffin Stokes was found in. Dawn admits that Stokes consented to her drinking some of his blood but insists she did not murder him. Penrose and Gleeson conduct an autopsy and discover that Stokes had consumed vodka prior to his death. Cooper and Jackson also question Dawn's daughter, while the latter struggles with his fear of vampires. During their investigation, Mackey and Dempsey discover that the blood pumping machine had been tampered with, causing it to drain Stokes of too much blood. The NCIS team discover that Nicholai and Atticus murdered Stokes, jealous of the attention he was receiving from Dawn and her daughter. They arrest the pair following a chase at a Lazar family concert.
17	9	"Mango Madness"	Kriv Stenders	Steven McGregor	4 April 2025
The NCIS team travel to Darwin to investigate the death of United States Marines Corporal David Garcia, who was killed in a training exercise involving the Marines and the Australian Army. Dempsey and Cooper discover a grenade fragment supposedly implicating Australian soldier Angus Tipoloura, while Mackey learns from Garcia's girlfriend Maria Soares about a love triangle involving Garcia and Tipoloura. As tensions between the Marines and Australian soldiers escalate, the team discover that Garcia was involved in smuggling military weapons to militant groups in East Timor and Indonesia. The team discovers that Garcia's superior, Sergeant Jensen, planted evidence framing Tipoloura for Garcia's murder. Before they can apprehend Jensen, they discover that he has taken Tipoloura to Tipoloura's jungle cabin. They find a dying Tipoloura and a dead Jensen, with a missing missile launcher.
18	10	"Sting in the Tail"	Kriv Stenders	Morgan O'Neill & James Cripps	11 April 2025
In a flashback scene, Colonel Rankin wakes up in an East Timor hotel to find himself implanted with a pacemaker. In the present, the NCIS team continue investigating the missing missile launcher. Mackey and Dempsey clash over Dempsey's suspicions about Etienne, an old friend of Mackey who is the CEO of an aid NGO. The team later find Etienne bound and gagged in his freighter Petre. The investigation coincides with a high-level meeting between the Australian Foreign Minister and US Rear Admiral Olson in Darwin. East Timorese militants disrupt the meeting and kidnap the Foreign Minister and Cooper. Though the militants are non-violent, their arms supplier Hensie Dekker attempts to kill the hostages. The team are saved by Mackey and Jackson. Dekker flees but is killed by a crocodile. Dempsey also convinces Sydney doctors to revive Colonel Rankin, who identifies Dekker as the man who installed him with the pacemaker. After Dempsey discovers evidence that Etienne was a co-conspirator of Dekker, JD fatally shoots him before he can detonate an explosive. Meanwhile, Penrose and Gleeson bond over fishing. After the team returns to Sydney, Gleeson is confronted by a mysterious woman inside her home.

=== Season 3 (2025–26) ===
No. overall	No. in season	Title	Directed by	Written by	Original release date
19	1	"Gut Instinct"	Jennifer Leacey	Morgan O'Neill	14 October 2025
The discovery of two missing U.S. Navy aviators adrift in the Coral Sea leads the team to expose a sinister terrorist plot.
20	2	"True Blue"	Jennifer Leacey	Justin Monjo	21 October 2025
Concerned about Blue, Doc breaks into her apartment, where DeShawn and Evie make a shocking discovery about one of their own.
21	3	"Lost in Translation"	David Caesar	James Cripps	28 October 2025
The team's hunt for a high-value U.S. target accused of murdering an Australian soldier takes an unexpected turn when the suspect claims to have evidence of a war crime.
22	4	"The Truth is Outback"	David Caesar	Written by : Michael Miller; Story by : Eloise Healey	4 November 2025
When a U.S. Navy pilot goes missing at a UFO hotspot in the Outback after being chased by blinding lights, the team must discover if the truth is really "out there".
23	5	"Black is White"	Catherine Millar	Michael Miller & James Cripps & Andrew Anastasios	11 November 2025
When a U.S. Navy attaché is found dead with a USB lodged in his throat, the team tracks a killer believed to have ties to an international chess tournament in Sydney.
24	6	"Sucker Punch"	Catherine Millar	Fiona Kelly & Ella Cook	18 November 2025
25	7	"Gold Digger"	Grant Brown	James Cripps & Julia Moriarty	2 December 2025
26	8	"Turkey Shoot"	Grant Brown	Michael Miller	9 December 2025
27	9	"South of Nowhere"	Kriv Stenders	Josh Sambono & Morgan O'Neill	3 March 2026
28	10	"Van Life"	Kriv Stenders	Steven McGregor & Michael Miller & James Cripps & Morgan O'Neill	10 March 2026
29	11	"Berthed"	Christiaan Van Vuuren	Ella Cooke	17 March 2026
30	12	"Lone Wolf"	David Caesar	Michael Miller & James Cripps	24 March 2026
31	13	"Lone Wolf"	David Caesar	Michael Miller & James Cripps	31 March 2026
32	14	"Death Card"	Christiaan Van Vuuren	Paul Leyden	7 April 2026
33	15	"The Collective"	Jennifer Leacey	James Cripps	14 April 2026
34	16	"Ticker"	Jennifer Leacey	Christine Bartlett	21 April 2026
35	17	"Flight Club"	Catherine Millar	Michael Miller	28 April 2026
36	18	"Rough Diamond"	Catherine Millar	Morgan O'Neill & James Cripps & Jessica Tuckwell	5 May 2026
37	19	"Hunter"	Grant Brown	Morgan O'Neill & James Cripps	12 May 2026
38	20	"Killer"	Grant Brown	Morgan O'Neill & James Cripps	12 May 2026

== Production ==
On 16 February 2022, it was reported that a spin-off set in Sydney, Australia, was in the works. NCIS: Los Angeles producer Shane Brennan was attached to the project. The series was created by Morgan O'Neill. It is executive produced by O'Neill, Sara Richardson and Sue Seeary and produced by Michele Bennett. It began filming in May 2023.

On 20 March 2024, NCIS: Sydney was renewed for a second season, which premiered on 7 February 2025. Two special episodes were filmed in Darwin and surrounding areas for season 2.

The series was renewed for a third season on 21 February 2025 and later premiered on 14 October 2025. After a mid-season hiatus, season 3 would continue on 17 February 2026 in Australia and 3 March 2026 in the U.S.

== Broadcast ==
=== Australian broadcast ===
NCIS: Sydney premiered 10 November 2023 on Paramount+ in Australia. On 13 November, it was announced that the first season would receive a delayed free-to-air broadcast on Network 10 in 2024; the first episode aired 27 November as a "special preview" to promote Paramount+, followed by a full run beginning on 14 May 2024.

=== International broadcast ===
The series is distributed outside Australia by Paramount Global Content Distribution and is available for streaming on Paramount+ in New Zealand, the United States, the UK, Ireland, South Korea, Canada, Italy, France, Germany, Switzerland, Austria and Japan.

After initially being slated to be a Paramount+ exclusive in the United States, the franchise's parent network CBS announced in September 2023 that NCIS: Sydney would premiere on 14 November 2023 as replacement programming due to the WGA and SAG–AFTRA strikes (which had disrupted all American television and film production). It would initially air in the Tuesday night timeslot normally occupied by NCIS, as its next season was delayed to early-2024. The series became the first Australian television series to air in U.S. prime time. In Canada, the series was similarly picked up by Global, airing in simulcast with the CBS airing.

Until its main scripted lineup returned, NCIS: Sydney was briefly the highest-rated program on CBS's lineup. In March 2024, it was confirmed that season 2 would also air on CBS; network executive Amy Reisenbach noted that the series performed well in viewership, even with the limited amount of original programming surrounding it on its schedule due to the strikes. Season 2 premiered on 7 February 2025 in a Friday night timeslot, replacing Blue Bloods following its series finale. Season 3 premiered on CBS on 14 October 2025, with the series returning to Tuesday nights alongside NCIS and NCIS: Origins.

== Ratings ==
=== Australian ratings ===
These are the Australian ratings for episodes airing on Network 10.

==== Season 1 (2024) ====
No.	Title	Air date	Timeslot	Overnight ratings		Ref(s)
No.	Title	Air date	Timeslot	Viewers	Rank	Ref(s)
1	"Gone Fission"	27 November 2023 (preview special); 15 May 2024 (official premiere)	Monday 8:40pm Wednesday 8:40pm	310,000 340,000	16 20	
2	"Snakes in the Grass"	22 May 2024	Wednesday 8:40pm	341,000	16	
3	"Brothers in Arms"	29 May 2024	Wednesday 8:40pm	332,000	23	
4	"Ghosted"	5 June 2024	Wednesday 8:40pm	252,000	23	
5	"Doggieccino Day Afternoon"	12 June 2024	Wednesday 8:40pm	359,000	18	
6	"Extraction"	19 June 2024	Wednesday 8:40pm	341,000	19	
7	"Bunker Down"	26 June 2024	Wednesday 8:40pm	265,000	28	
8	"Blonde Ambition"	3 July 2024	Wednesday 8:45pm	318,000	18	

==== Season 2 (2026) ====
No.	Title	Air date	Timeslot	Overnight ratings	Ref(s)
No.	Title	Air date	Timeslot	Viewers	Ref(s)
1	"Heat Starter"	18 January 2026	Sunday 9:00pm	275,000	
2	"Fire in the Hole"	25 January 2026	Sunday 8:30pm	229,000	
3	"Back in the USSR"	1 February 2026	Sunday 8:30pm	227,000	
4	"Truth Sabre"	8 February 2026	Sunday 8:30pm	228,000	
5	"Shucked"	15 February 2026	Sunday 8:30pm	194,000	
6	"Hell Weak"	22 February 2026	Sunday 8:15pm	203,000	
7	"Breathless"	15 March 2026	Sunday 8:30pm	171,000	
8	"Blood Is Thicker Than Vodka"	22 March 2026	Sunday 8:30pm	189,000	
9	"Mango Madness"	29 March 2026	Sunday 8:30pm	183,000	
10	"Stick in the Tail"	5 April 2026	Sunday 8:30pm	183,000	

==== Season 3 (2026) ====
No.	Title	Air date	Timeslot	Overnight ratings	Ref(s)
No.	Title	Air date	Timeslot	Viewers	Ref(s)
1	"Gut Instinct"	16 July 2026	Thursday 7:30pm	194,000	
2	"True Blue"	23 July 2026	Thursday 7:30pm	175,000	
3	"Lost in Translation"	30 July 2026	Thursday 7:30pm	182,000	
4	"The Truth is Outback"	6 August 2026	Thursday 8:30pm	176,000	
5	"Black is White"	13 August 2026	Thursday 8:30pm	162,000	
6	"Sucker Punch"	20 August 2026	Thursday 8:30pm	192,000	
7	"Gold Digger"	27 August 2026	Thursday 8:30pm	149,000	
8	"Turkey Shoot"	3 September 2026	Thursday 8:30pm	183,000	
9	"South of Nowhere"	10 September 2026	Thursday 8:30pm	190,000	
10	"Van Life"	17 September 2026	Thursday 8:30pm	248,000	
11	"Berthed"	24 September 2026	Thursday 8:30pm	236,000	
12	"Lone Wolf"	1 October 2026	Thursday 8:30pm	230,000	
13	"Lone Wolf"	8 October 2026	Thursday 8:50pm	159,000	
14	"Death Card"	15 October 2026	Thursday 8:55pm	164,000	
15	"The Collective"	22 October 2026	Thursday 8:55pm	140,000	

=== International ratings ===
As replacement programming on CBS in the U.S. during the 2023 Hollywood labor disputes, the series had the highest rated premiere viewership for a broadcast show premiering in fall 2023 and was the top most watched new series on broadcast television as of January 2024. In Australia, it was the most watched local program since the launch of Paramount+ in the country.
