= Rex Hunt =

Australian rules footballer, born 1949

Personal information
- Full name: Rex James Hunt
- Born: 7 March 1949 (age 77); Mentone, Victoria, Australia
- Original team: Parkdale
- Height: 191 cm (6 ft 3 in)
- Weight: 97 kg (214 lb)
- Position: Full-forward/centre half-back

Playing career^{1}
Years	Club	Games (Goals)
1968–1974	Richmond	113 (121)
1974–1975	Geelong	32 (44)
1976–1978	St Kilda	57 (111)
1980–1981	Sandringham	38 (203)
Total		240 (479)
- ^{1} Playing statistics correct to the end of 1978.

Career highlights
- 2× VFL Premiership 1969, 1973; 2× Championship of Australia Championship 1969, 1973; Jim 'Frosty' Miller Medal: 1981

Rex James Hunt (born 7 March 1949) is an Australian television and radio personality. A former Australian rules footballer, he became a commentator known for his habit of making up quirky nicknames for players. He has also been known around the world for fishing and wildlife programs on the Seven Network and overseas stations. He is a former police officer who reached the senior rank of Sergeant in Victoria Police at age 30. He also previously owned a restaurant, the D'lish Fish located in Port Melbourne.

== Early life ==
Hunt was born in Mentone, Victoria, and attended Mordialloc High School. He joined the police force as a cadet after leaving school. In 1970, he was called up to national service.

== Football career ==
Hunt was recruited from Parkdale by Richmond and made his debut in the then Victorian Football League in 1968. He was a key-position player who was usually a full-forward or centre half-forward, but later played at centre half-back. He was part of Richmond's premiership sides in 1969 and 1973.

In the middle of 1974, due to his work as a policeman, Hunt moved to the Geelong Football Club. He played 32 games with Geelong in 1974 and 1975 as a big, strong forward, before moving back to Melbourne and playing with St Kilda. He retired from VFL football at the end of the 1978 season, but continued to play in the lower-level VFA in 1980 and 1981 with Sandringham. He won the Frosty Miller Medal in 1981, kicking 110 goals.

== Statistics ==
Legend
G	Goals	K	Kicks	D	Disposals	T	Tackles
B	Behinds	H	Handballs	M	Marks

Season	Team	No.	Games	Totals							Averages (per game)						
Season	Team	No.	Games	G	B	K	H	D	M	T	G	B	K	H	D	M	T
1968	Richmond	43	13	16	25	144	15	159	97	—N/a	1.2	1.9	11.1	1.2	12.2	7.5	—N/a
1969	Richmond	5	20	55	45	153	14	167	93	—N/a	2.8	2.3	7.7	0.7	8.4	4.7	—N/a
1970	Richmond	5	16	36	34	140	28	168	104	—N/a	2.3	2.1	8.8	1.8	10.5	6.5	—N/a
1971	Richmond	5	20	4	3	240	24	264	141	—N/a	0.2	0.2	12.0	1.2	13.2	7.1	—N/a
1972	Richmond	5	14	1	2	156	16	172	66	—N/a	0.1	0.1	11.1	1.1	12.3	4.7	—N/a
1973	Richmond	5	23	4	3	270	18	288	114	—N/a	0.2	0.1	11.7	0.8	12.5	5.0	—N/a
1974	Richmond	5,6	7	5	11	65	8	73	40	—N/a	0.7	1.6	9.3	1.1	10.4	5.7	—N/a
1974	Geelong	5,6	15	26	17	221	20	241	137	—N/a	1.7	1.1	14.7	1.3	16.1	9.8	—N/a
1975	Geelong	6	17	18	12	139	17	156	85	—N/a	1.1	0.8	8.7	1.1	9.8	5.3	—N/a
1976	St Kilda	2	22	21	31	259	40	299	168	—N/a	1.0	1.4	11.8	1.8	13.6	7.6	—N/a
1977	St Kilda	2	18	52	31	180	18	198	103	—N/a	2.9	1.9	10.0	1.0	11.0	5.7	—N/a
1978	St Kilda	5	17	38	29	163	35	198	106	—N/a	2.2	1.8	9.6	2.1	11.6	6.2	—N/a
Career			202	276	243	2130	253	2383	1254	—N/a	1.4	1.2	10.6	1.3	11.9	6.3	—N/a

== Sports media and commentary career ==
After his retirement as a player, Hunt became a popular football commentator for 3AW. He also hosted Sunday morning panel shows on the Seven Network, the Sportsworld Footy Panel and I'm Rex Hunt and You're Not. Early in the 2007 season, Rex celebrated his 1,500th game as a commentator of VFL/AFL games. He announced his resignation from 3AW to join Triple M on 17 November 2009.

In 2008, Hunt gave a poetic tribute to fellow commentator Clinton Grybas, who died unexpectedly at 32 years old.

Hunt announced his retirement from mainstream metropolitan commentary in 2011; however, he continued as a commentator for Crocmedia's AFL coverage, calling alongside Peter Donegan. In 2015, Hunt called his 2,000th game of AFL football

In April 2014, Hunt started a new radio show on SEN 1116 called This Is Your Football Life exploring the lives and achievements of various VFL/AFL football legends. The show is produced by Crocmedia and airs on Sunday mornings.

In 2017, Hunt returned to 3AW as host of a new post-match talkback program. After Richmond advanced to a preliminary final against the GWS Giants, Hunt also commentated on a Richmond-centric "Tiger Radio" broadcast on AFL Nation with fellow Tiger footballers Dale Weightman and Tony Jewell.

In July 2021, Hunt parted ways with 3AW after an on-air disagreement with management.

=== Nicknames ===
Hunt is best known for his commentary on 3AW and has a penchant for making up nicknames for players such as "not a well man" for Sean Wellman of the Essendon Football Club; "Doctor Christiaan Barnard" for Essendon Football Club player Paul Barnard; "Ot 'n' Sticky" for Geelong footballer Brad Ottens; "Yellow Brick Croad" for Hawthorn footballer Trent Croad; "Oysters Kilpatrick" for Geelong footballer Glenn Kilpatrick; "Special Fried Rice" for ex-Carlton footballer Dean Rice; "Premium Light" for Western Bulldogs footballer Mitch Hahn; "The Mediator" for Kangaroos footballer Troy Makepeace; "Heavy Overnight Dew" for Port Adelaide footballer Stuart Dew; "Horney Torney" for Richmond and Adelaide footballer Jason Torney; "Awesome Wells" for Kangaroos player Daniel Wells; "Hooligan" for Blues player Ryan Houlihan; "Thomas the Tank" for Collingwood player Dale Thomas; "Brogan Josh" for Port Adelaide player Dean Brogan; "Yaaaablett!!" for Geelong star Gary Ablett; and "Presti-gee-a-perry-como" for Collingwood player Simon Prestigiacomo. He is also known for his fat-lady-sings impression and the build-up that surrounds it when he (she) bellows out a tune declaring the match over. He was also known for "Listen to the fans", a feature he did during the 2006 and 2007 season after a player kicked a goal, when "Listen to the Band" by The Monkees was played.

== Fishing journalist career ==
In 1981, Hunt was giving regular radio fishing reports and had made two videos on the subject. His first television fishing show was Angling Action on the Ten Network. Two series of 13 episodes were made and were shown in 1981 and 1982, respectively. His 3DB radio fishing show began in 1982. Throughout the 1980s, Hunt continued to write for a number of newspapers and magazines. In 1991, a series of Rex Hunt's Fishing World was made and broadcast in Victoria on Channel Seven. A new and longer series of the show went national as Rex Hunt's Fishing Australia the following year. In 1992, the name changed again to Rex Hunt's Fishing Adventure, which remained on air until 2004. He also had a show on radio 1116 SEN hosting a fishing program called Off The Hook with son-in-law Lee Raynor.

Hunt's two most famous catchphrases from these shows were "Folks, it doesn't get any better than this!" as he reeled in a huge fish from the waters of one of Australia's most beautiful natural areas and, at the end of each episode, "It's yibbida-yibbida time!", a parody of the Warner Brothers' cartoon character Porky Pig saying "Be-bidda be-bidda be-bidda be... That's all, folks." He also had a famous habit of kissing the fish he didn't keep before releasing them.

Hunt also made public pronouncements regarding the "thugs in the scallop industry" and their dredging of Port Phillip Bay, describing their actions as "dizzy stuff". He and a group of anglers and activists were successful in removing the dredging boats and restoring fish populations within the bay.

== Controversies ==
=== Airline incident ===
In May 2004, Hunt made a curious attempt to make a statement about airline security, which has been markedly increased in Australia after terrorist threats. Hunt was agitated at having to remove his pants and footwear after setting off a metal detector. He then took ten metal forks from the Qantas Club and took them on board a Qantas flight from Adelaide headed for Melbourne in an attempt to prove that airport security was totally flawed. A concerned passenger who did not recognise Hunt alerted the flight crew and he was detained on arrival in Melbourne, where he was questioned for approximately 30 minutes and let go without any charges filed against him.

=== Leon Davis controversy ===
Hunt was involved in a controversial incident involving a racial slur in 2005, when he called Collingwood's Leon Davis, who is of Aboriginal descent, 'as black as a dog' during the call against Essendon mid-way through the season. Hunt made the comment when he trailed off while saying "Neon Leon hasn't lit up tonight; he's as black as a dog's guts in the night", claiming it was to describe Davis's poor form in that match in terms of a neon lights metaphor; other members of the commentary team had been using different neon lights metaphors in the same context. Hunt's apology to Davis was initially rejected, and only accepted later in the week after a face-to-face meeting.

=== Byron Bay fight ===
In 2005, Hunt and his son were involved in an incident in Byron Bay where he claimed to have been attacked by local teenagers. The teenagers involved, however, claim Hunt was extremely intoxicated at the time and that his son had thrown the first punch.

=== Infidelity ===
On 17 May 2006, News Ltd exposed Hunt's 15 years of secret sexual liaisons. When confronted, Hunt confessed he had paid three women in succession for ongoing sexual relationships over a period of more than 15 years. The final relationship, with a beautician in her 30s, began in 1997 and cost Hunt $1000 a week. Hunt acknowledged he is a hypocrite given his repeated attacks on other media personalities for sexual infidelity. Hunt followed this by an interview with radio broadcaster Neil Mitchell on Melbourne radio 3AW. A quote from Rex Hunt's radio comments,

That's what a fool does. I'm invincible, I'm paying money... uh... The girl's happy, she's got no money, I got my rocks off. How good is this?

has gained its own notoriety by being featured repeatedly on national Triple M radio program Get This hosted by Tony Martin, Ed Kavalee and Richard Marsland. Robyn Hood, 40 at the time, one of the three women involved, subsequently sold her story to New Idea magazine. Robyn was quoted as saying:

Rex was never unfaithful to Lynne. "We never had sex... he was affectionate, very touchy-feely... then he'd either, in the car or out of it, depending on how cold it was, fling off all his clothes. The more public, the greater the danger and the more exciting Rex apparently found it.

Rex Hunt's wife of thirty four years, Lynne, said she would stand by Hunt and also revealed she has bipolar disorder, which had placed pressure on the couple's relationship.

=== Road-rage incident ===
In 2009, Hunt was found guilty of recklessly causing injury after allegations he bashed a cyclist with his own bicycle in a Melbourne road-rage attack. He was sentenced to perform 100 hours unpaid community work, without conviction.

=== Thief encounter ===
In December 2021, it was reported that Hunt confronted and thwarted a would-be thief when a reporter’s laptop bag was snatched during an exhibition boxing match in Melbourne.

=== Facebook rant about Daisy Pearce ===
He became embroiled in a high-profile hostile war of words after making a Facebook rant calling for controversial AFL Hall of Famer Wayne Carey to replace AFLW champion Daisy Pearce on Channel 7’s live football coverage.

=== Health scare ===
In January 2023, at 2:15 am, Hunt called police after pulling over his car to the side of the road in a health emergency, where he was subsequently taken to hospital. Before and since, Hunt has opened up about his mental health struggles that have dogged him since his retirement from playing football:

I was gone ... despite the clown of the circus having a rubber nose, behind the makeup and rubber nose may well be the loneliest person in the world.

== Personal life ==
Rex is married to wife Lynne and has three sons and one daughter.
