= Sarah Watt =

Australian film director (1958–2011)

- Born: Sarah Ann Watt; 30 August 1958; Sydney, New South Wales, Australia
- Died: 4 November 2011 (aged 53); West Footscray, Victoria, Australia
- Occupations: Film director, writer, animator
- Spouse: William McInnes
- Children: 2

Sarah Ann Watt McInnes (30 August 1958 – 4 November 2011) was an Australian film director, writer, and animator. She is especially known for her 2005 film Look Both Ways.

== Early life and education ==
Sarah Ann Watt was born in Sydney on 30 August 1958.

She completed a Graduate Diploma of Film and Television (Animation) at the Swinburne Film and Television School, Melbourne, in 1990. Her student film Catch of the Day was to reflect the style of future work.

== Career ==
In 1995, she directed a short film, Small Treasures, which won Best Short Film at the Venice Film Festival. In 2000, she made a program for the SBS series Swim Between the Flags called "Local Dive". It was made concurrently with another project that she was directing called "The Way of the Birds" based on the 1996 book of the same name by author Meme McDonald. She received the Australian Film Institute's award for Best Director for her 2005 film Look Both Ways.

Watt returned to the Victorian College of the Arts School of Film and Television to teach animation, and assisted in the development of many animators, including Academy Award winner Adam Elliot in 1996. Watt was instrumental in the development of scripts for all of her students, but left the school to further develop her own projects, returning on occasion as a script and final production assessor.

Watt was also a published author. She wrote and illustrated the picture book Clem Always Could and co-authored Worse Things Happen at Sea with William McInnes.

During the post-production of Look Both Ways, Watt was diagnosed with cancer. Her second film My Year Without Sex was released in 2009.

She died on 4 November 2011 after suffering for six years from breast and bone cancer, aged 53.

Sarah Watt was married to actor and writer William McInnes. They have two children, Clem (b. 1993) and Stella (b. 1998).

In the years before her death, Watt had begun developing an animated adaptation of Magic Beach, the beloved picture book by Australian author Alison Lester. The project was considered a personal passion of Watt's, blending her talent for evocative, painterly visuals with Lester's whimsical storytelling. Following Watt's death, the project was revived and brought to life by director Robert Connolly, who completed the film in her honor. The adaptation of Magic Beach was released in 2025 as a feature-length animated film, receiving praise for its emotional depth and its tribute to Watt's original vision.

== Awards ==
=== Won ===
- 2013- Byron Kennedy Award at the AACTA Awards
- 2009- Grass Award at the Australian Directors Guild for My Year Without Sex
- 2006- Best Direction of a First Feature Film at the Australian Screen Directors' Association Awards (now the Australian Directors Guild) for Look Both Ways
- 2006- Best Screenplay at the Mar del Plata Film Festival for Look Both Ways
- 2006- Propeller of Motovum at the Motovun Film Festival for Look Both Ways
- 2006- Critics Award at the NatFilm Festival for Look Both Ways
- 2006- KNF Award at the Rotterdam International Film Festival for Look Both Ways
- 2005- Best Direction at the Australian Film Institute Awards (now the AACTA Awards) for Look Both Ways
- 2005- Best Original Screenplay at the Australian Film Institute Awards (now the AACTA Awards) for Look Both Ways
- 2005- Best Film at the Film Critics Circle of Australia Awards for Look Both Ways
- 2005- Best Director at the Film Critics Circle of Australia Awards for Look Both Ways
- 2005- Best Screenplay- Original at the Film Critics Circle of Australia for Look Both Ways
- 2005- Best Direction at the Inside Film Awards for Look Both Ways
- 2005- Best Script at the Inside Film Awards for Look Both Ways
- 2005- FIPRESCI Prize at the Brisbane International Film Festival for Look Both Ways
- 2001- Best Short Animation at the Australian Film Institute Awards (now the AACTA Awards) for Living with Happiness
- 1996- Special Jury Prize at the Hiroshima International Animation Festival for Small Treasures
- 1995- OCIC Award at the Melbourne International Film Festival for Small Treasures

=== Nominated ===
- 2009- Best Screenplay- Original at the Australian Film Institute Awards (now the AACTA Awards) for My Year Without Sex
- 2006- Best Film at the Mar del Plata Film Festival for Look Both Ways
- 2005- Best Feature at the Chicago International Film Festival for Look Both Ways
- 2005- Screen International Award at the European Film Awards for Look Both Ways
- 2005- Best Feature Film at the Inside Film Awards for Look Both Ways
- 2000- Best Short Animation Film at the Australian Film Institute Awards (now the AACTA Awards) for The Way of the Birds
- 1995- Best Short Film at the Chicago International Film Festival for Small Treasures
