= Rex Hunt's Fishing Adventure =

- Genre: Fishing show
- Presented by: Rex Hunt
- Country of origin: Australia
- Original language: English
- No. of seasons: 14
- No. of episodes: 300+

Production
- Running time: 30 minutes
- Production companies: Roadhouse Productions (1991-2000); Dreampool Productions (2001-2004); Rex Hunt Enterprises (2002-2004)

Original release
- Network: Seven Network
- Release: 1991 – 2004

Rex Hunt's Fishing Adventure is an Australian fishing television series hosted by Rex Hunt and co-host Steve Starling. It aired from 1991 to 2004 on the Seven Network.

The show popularized several catchphrases including "yibbida-yibbida" and "Folks, it doesn't get any better than this!".

== Reception ==
In 1999, a review in The Sydney Morning Herald said that although the Rex Hunt character in the show could become "wearing", "at his best, he is a relaxed and genial host". The review added, "there's always truly expert and detailed advice on a Hunt fishing show, almost too much of it if you are not seriously interested in going out on the weekend with your rod".

== See also ==
- List of longest-running Australian television series
