= Tuuli Narkle =

Australian actress

- Born: Western Australia
- Occupation: Actress
- Years active: 2021–present
- Notable work: Mystery Road: Origin; NCIS: Sydney

Tuuli Narkle is an Australian TV and stage actress. She is best known for her turns as Mary Swan on Mystery Road: Origin and Constable Evie Cooper on NCIS: Sydney. For her role on Mystery Road: Origin in she won the 2022 AACTA Award for Best Lead Actress in a Television Drama.

== Early life and education ==
Tuuli Narkle was born in Western Australia. She is of Aboriginal Australian and Finnish descent. She is a Noongar woman of the Yued and Wiilman cultural blocs, with familial ties to the York and Goldfields regions. She learnt cultural dance at a young age. While at high school, she was obsessed with the relationship between NCIS characters Gibbs and DiNozzo.

Narkle was accepted into the John Curtin College of the Arts to study acting, and at the same time continued to train as a dancer at the Charlesworth Ballet Institute. After taking a major acting role on stage in Stolen, by Jane Harrison, directed and produced by Leah Purcell, Narkle auditioned for the National Institute of Dramatic Art, from which she graduated with bachelor in fine arts in 2018.

== Career ==
=== Stage ===
Narkle began her career on stage with an appearance as Ruby in Stolen by Jane Harrison.

In 2019 she appeared in Winyanboga Yurringa at Belvoir Street Theatre, and in Nakkiah Lui's Black is the New White.

In 2021 Narkle played the part of Evonne Goolagong Cawley in the stage show Sunshine Super Girl and in 2022 played Helen in Emme Hoy's adaptation of The Tenant of Wildfell Hall.

=== Screen ===
Narkle played a lead role in the ABC comedy series All My Friends Are Racist in 2021. In 2022 she played a younger version of Tasma Walton's character Mary Swan in Mystery Road: Origin, a prequel series to Mystery Road, opposite Mark Coles Smith as detective Jay Swan.

In 2023 Narkle appeared in the drama series Bad Behaviour. Also in 2023, she played AFP liaison officer Constable Evie Cooper in the Network 10/Paramount+ series NCIS: Sydney. She played Keeley Redford in the 2024 Netflix drama series Territory.

Narkle reprises her lead role as Mary Swan in the second season of Mystery Road: Origin, which premiered on 21 September 2025 on ABC TV, with all episodes available on iview.

== Awards ==
For her performance in Mystery Road: Origin she won the 2022 AACTA Award for Best Lead Actress in a Television Drama.

== Filmography ==
Year	Title	Role	Notes
2021	All My Friends Are Racist	Belle / Nicole	5 episodes
2022-present	Mystery Road: Origin	Mary	12 episodes (2 seasons)
2023	Bad Behaviour	Miss Lacey	4 episodes
2023–present	NCIS: Sydney	Evie Cooper	Main role
2024	Territory	Keeley Redford	5 episodes
