= Morgan O'Neill =

Australian writer and director

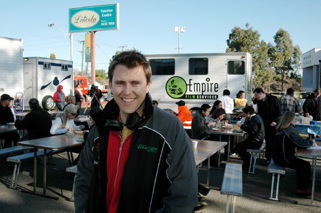
- Born: 19 April 1973 (age 53); Sydney, Australia
- Occupations: Actor, film director, screenwriter, producer
- Years active: 1999–present
- Spouse: Sarah Sonneville (2012–present)
- Children: 1

Morgan O'Neill (born 19 April 1973 in Sydney, Australia) is an Australian showrunner, executive producer, writer, director and professional musician. Having earned a degree in literature from the University of Sydney, he graduated from the National Institute of Dramatic Art (NIDA) with a BA in performing arts (acting) in 1998. Since then, he has worked in the entertainment industry, both in Australia and the United States, with television roles including Home and Away, All Saints, Water Rats and Sea Patrol. O'Neill also appeared in Crocodile Dundee in Los Angeles, Joanne Lees: Murder in the Outback, Supernova, Little Oberon and the 2012 Netflix movie, The Factory, which he also directed. He directed the ABC TV Show Les Norton. O'Neill worked as a producer on Nine Network's The Block. He is now showrunning NCIS: Sydney.

== Personal life ==
O'Neill is a graduate of the King's School, Sydney. He resides in Sydney with his wife Sarah Sonneville.

== Filmography ==
- 2006 || Solo - writer & director
- 2011 || The Factory - writer & director
- 2013 || Drift - writer & director
- 2019 || Les Norton - writer & director
- 2021 || Last King of the Cross - writer
- 2023 || NCIS: Sydney - showrunner, writer & executive producer

== Awards ==
In 2005, he won the first Project Greenlight Award of A$1,000,000 to make his film, Solo. The film received three FCCA award nominations, including for his screenplay. Since then he has written and directed The Factory. His film Drift was released in 2013.

His films have won awards in The Newport Beach Film Festival in California (Outstanding Achievement in Filmmaking), Rincon International Film Festival in Puerto Rico (Best Feature Film, Best Overall Film, Audience Choice Award), Isola Del Cinema, Italy, St Kilda Film Festival and Tropfest. His films have been selected to appear at The Sydney Film Festival, The Hamptons International Film Festival, Manhattan Short Film Festival, Dungog International Film Festival and the Melbourne Comedy Festival.
