= Dangerous Remedy =

- Genre: Historical drama
- Inspired by: It Isn’t Nice by Bertram Wainer
- Written by: Kris Wyld
- Directed by: Ken Cameron
- Starring: Jeremy Sims; Susie Porter; William McInnes; Maeve Dermody; Mark Leonard Winter
- Composer: Guy Gross
- Country of origin: Australia
- Original language: English

Production
- Executive producers: Andrew Myer; David Ogilvy; Carole Sklan
- Producer: Ned Lander
- Cinematography: Roger Lanser
- Editor: Peter Carrodus
- Running time: 105:00
- Production company: Eclipse Films

Original release
- Network: ABC1
- Release: 4 November 2012

Dangerous Remedy is an Australian historical drama and crime thriller telemovie, which was broadcast on ABC1 on 4 November 2012. It depicts real life Scottish-born doctor, Bertram Wainer (Jeremy Sims) as he strives for abortion law reform in the state of Victoria during the late 1960s and early 1970s.

== Plot ==
In 1967 Bertram attends a young woman who is haemorrhaging severely after having a "backyard" abortion – she later dies in hospital. By 1969 Bertram is campaigning for abortion law reform and is assisted by Jo and Peggy. Peggy is having an affair with John, who is a physically abusive police inspector. Bertram, Jo and Lionel investigate a police protection racket, with doctors bribing police to "look the other way" by not investigating their illegal abortions. The corrupt police are from the homicide squad with John appointed as their head and his boss, Jack. Bertram and his family are targeted with arson, serious assault and murder attempts. Lionel dies in suspicious circumstances, which police attribute to suicide. John threatens Bertram to drop his crusade, while Arthur ignores Bertram's calls for an independent investigation into police corruption. Despite these setbacks Bertram uses the press to raise public awareness of the corruption and forces the state government into holding an independent inquiry in January 1970. This results in three police officers, including John and Jack, being jailed.

== Cast ==
- Jeremy Sims as Bertram Wainer – general practitioner, campaigns for abortion law reform
- Susie Porter as Peggy Berman – medical clinic receptionist, John's mistress, becomes a women's rights activist
- William McInnes as John Ford – Victorian police detective inspector, becomes head of Homicide department
- Maeve Dermody as Joanne Bertram – women's rights activist, became Bertram's second wife
- Mark Leonard Winter as Lionel Pugh – Australian Broadcasting Corporation investigative journalist, Bertram's public relations officer
- Gary Sweet as Jack Matthews – police detective superintendent, Ford's boss
- Caroline Craig as Barbara Wainer – Bertran's first wife
- Nicholas Bell as Troup – medical doctor, has his patients' files confiscated during a police raid
- Peter O'Brien as Barry Smith – medical doctor, performs abortions, fakes his own death to escape investigation by press and Wainer
- Chris Haywood as Sir Arthur Rylah – state deputy premier, justice minister, refuses to acknowledge Bertran's claims of police corruption
- Daniela Farinacci as Mariah
- Emily Wheaton as Bonnie McGregor

== Production ==
The script was written by Kris Wyld and is loosely based on Wainer's account, It Isn't Nice (1972). Dangerous Remedy was directed by Ken Cameron and produced for the ABC by Ned Lander with filming in Melbourne commencing in March 2012. At the 2nd AACTA Awards, held in January 2013, Porter was nominated for Best Lead Actress in a Television Drama for her role of Peggy Berman.

== Critical reception ==
David Knox of TV Tonight provided a mixed review of Dangerous Remedy. He felt that Sims "carried the weight of almost every scene" and "gives [his role] everything he has." While Porter's "Berman plays a central role in this saga" and Winter provided "an impressive performance." Nevertheless, "whilst it's fair to say some of the shocking dramatics that befall Wainer did take place, here they stray close to adventures befitting a Saturday matinee on the silver screen." The Hoopla’s Lucy Clark found it had a "deep and everlasting value" in that it "highlights complexity in a debate too often characterised by polar extremes, by black and white."
