= The Factory (2012 film) =

- DVD cover
- Directed by: Morgan O'Neill
- Written by: Paul Leyden; Morgan O'Neill
- Produced by: Joel Silver; Susan Downey; David Gambino
- Starring: John Cusack; Jennifer Carpenter; Dallas Roberts; Mae Whitman; Sonya Walger
- Cinematography: Kramer Morgenthau
- Edited by: Tod Feuerman
- Music by: Mark Isham
- Production companies: Dark Castle Entertainment; Dan Carmody Productions
- Distributed by: Warner Bros. Pictures (United States); IM Global (International)
- Release dates: October 20, 2012 (Screamfest Film Festival); February 19, 2013 (United States)
- Running time: 104 minutes
- Country: United States
- Language: English
- Budget: $30 million

The Factory is a 2012 American crime thriller film directed by Morgan O'Neill and starring John Cusack, Mae Whitman, Dallas Roberts, Mageina Tovah, Cindy Sampson, and Jennifer Carpenter. In the film, Cusack plays a Buffalo, New York cop who has been chasing a serial kidnapper who abducts young women.

== Plot ==
In Buffalo, New York, a man named Carl picks up a woman he thinks is a prostitute and takes him to his home. When he realizes that she is transgender, he murders her, cuts up the body, and places the pieces in a freezer. Meanwhile, police detective Mike Fletcher becomes obsessed with the case, which is under threat of being shut down due to its inactivity. A troubled Thanksgiving holiday dinner reveals that he has been ignoring his family, including his rebellious daughter, Abby. Following an argument with her mother, Abby sneaks out of the house to be with her boyfriend Tad. At the diner where he works, Tad breaks up with her, and Abby runs outside. Tad sees her talk to a person in a car; when he next looks, she has disappeared. Carl kidnaps Abby and chains her up in his basement, where he keeps two other young women prisoner, Brittany and Lauren, who suffer from Stockholm syndrome.

Mike and his partner, Kelsey Walker, immediately investigate Abby's disappearance. Although he initially denies any knowledge of Abby's disappearance, Tad shows up at the police station the next day and identifies Darryl, a former suspect and Carl's co-conspirator, who he saw at the diner. Mike and Kelsey interrogate Darryl, but Mike physically assaults him and is taken off the case. Mike breaks into Darryl's house and finds a list of pharmaceuticals that Darryl has supplied to Carl, before Kelsey shows up to back him up. He takes the list to the hospital and has a brief conversation with Carl, who works as a cook there. Darryl's boss tells Mike that Darryl has not shown up for work and the list of drugs is written by a non-professional. Mike calls the company on the back of the list in the hope of finding him, but they are too busy to immediately respond.

That night, a snow storm shuts down the airport and forces Darryl to stay in town. Mike and Kelsey track Darryl to a hotel but find him dead and circumstantial evidence planted by Carl pointing to him as the kidnapper. Mike receives a call from the company, which turns out to be a catering company. He pieces that together with details of Carl's description by a would-be victim and realizes that Carl is the killer. He and Kelsey make their way to Carl's house as Kelsey reports it over the phone. Meanwhile, Abby, who had framed Brittany for breaking Carl's rules, convinces him that Brittany was just celebrating the fact she is pregnant, and Abby takes Brittany's place for a special dinner he had planned; she uses this opportunity to stab him with a corkscrew. Carl throws her back into the basement, where a pregnant Lauren's water has broken. Due to her immobility, she asks Abby to help cut the baby out.

Mike and Kelsey arrive at the house and find plenty of evidence, including a nursery with several babies in it. They hear noises from below, and, searching for the basement, Mike briefly talks to Abby over the house intercom. Abby tells him that Carl keeps the basement door key around his neck. Mike confronts and shoots Carl, but Kelsey picks up Carl's discarded shotgun and shoots Mike, revealing that she was with Carl the entire time (as she was Carl's first victim); her infertility left them unable to have children, so he set up the operation to kidnap prostitutes and force them to have children. Carl dies, but before Kelsey kills Mike, he reveals that Abby is pregnant. Kelsey frees Abby and takes Lauren's just-born baby, assuring them that they're safe. The police find Carl's nursery, which is now empty. Weeks later, Kelsey, using a new name, is shown to have moved to another city with the missing babies. She leaves a phone message to Abby in which she congratulates Abby on her expectant motherhood, which Abby later listens to, including the sound of a baby crying in the background. The film ends with Walker holding one of the abducted infants in her arms while staring towards the screen.

== Cast ==
- John Cusack as Mike Fletcher
- Jennifer Carpenter as Kelsey Walker
- Mae Whitman as Abby Fletcher
- Sonya Walger as Shelly Fletcher
- Dallas Roberts as Carl
- Mageina Tovah as Brittany
- Katherine Waterston as Lauren
- Michael Trevino as Tad
- Gary Anthony Williams as Darryl
- Ksenia Solo as Emma
- Maxim Roy as Head nurse
- Vincent Messina as Jed
- Conrad Pla as Steve
- Cindy Sampson as Crystal
- Glenda Braganza as Nurse

== Production ==
The film was shot in Montreal, Quebec in 2008.

== Release ==
The Factory was scheduled to be released on December 19, 2011, but it was never theatrically released by Dark Castle Entertainment via Warner Bros. The company then considered a DVD release for the third quarter of 2012, but the film was finally released on February 19, 2013.

== Reception ==
Jason Jenkins of Dread Central rated it 1/5 stars and called it "an overly familiar, listless thriller-without-thrills, full of bad writing and actors who know better." Lauren Taylor of Bloody Disgusting rated it 3/5 stars and wrote, "While it has a very great lull for the majority of running time, the ending of The Factory is worth the watch." Rohit Rao of DVD Talk rated it 2.5/5 stars and called it "a cookie cutter thriller" with a "supremely dumb, bone-headed twist". Patrick Bromley of DVD Verdict wrote, "The movie only gets sillier and stupider as it goes along, leading to a climax that's utterly ridiculous and abandons any goodwill the movie might have built up to that point." Scott Weinberg of Fearnet wrote, "The Factory is composed of seven or eight other films you've already seen before. And not composed especially well."

== See also ==
- Gary Heidnik kidnapped 6 young women, killing 2, while keeping them in a basement.
- 2013 Cleveland missing trio, three young women abducted and kept in captivity for years, who bore children of their kidnapper
- Kidnapping of Jaycee Lee Dugard, 1991 kidnapping of 11-year-old girl in California, who when found 18 years later had borne her kidnapper's two daughters
