= John Maynard (film producer) =

Australian film producer

John Maynard is an Australian film producer and film distributor who also played an important role in the development of New Zealand art museums. Together with producer Bridget Ikin, he has run Felix Media since 2011. He also co-founding director, with Robert Connolly, of Arenafilms, and the two filmmakers formerly worked through Footprint Films, before its closure in 1998.

== Early life and education ==
John Maynard was born in Australia.

== Career ==
=== Art ===
At the age of 23, having working as a secondary school fine arts teacher for a short time, Maynard was appointed as the first director of the Govett-Brewster Art Gallery in New Plymouth, New Zealand. Maynard worked with local architect Terry Boon to redevelop an existing cinema into a contemporary art gallery, that opened in February 1970. He also laid the groundwork for the gallery's programming through "progressive exhibition and collection policies". For the opening exhibition Maynard invited the young Auckland artist Leon Narbey to develop an immersive light installation titled Real Time to fill the whole gallery. Narbey went on to work again with Maynard in his film career both as a cameraman and director, and Maynard would produce Narbey's second feature film The Footstep Man in 1992.

Maynard left the Govett-Brewster in 1971 to travel overseas. In 1975 he took over the position of exhibitions officer at the Auckland City Art Gallery, a job previously held by Peter Webb. In that year Maynard developed Project Programmes, the first large-scale presentation of conceptual art in New Zealand. In discussing the programme, art critic Wystan Curnow described Maynard as "the man who made New Plymouth the place to see new Auckland sculpture". The series began with Formal Enema Enigma by John Lethbridge and was followed over the next three months with installations by Jim Allen, Bruce Barber, Kim Gray, David Mealing, and a group show that included Maree Horner. In 1976 Maynard developed the first Pan Pacific Biennale: Colour Photography and its Derivatives for the Auckland City Art Gallery. It included 20 artists from New Zealand, Australia, Japan and the USA including John Baldessari with his Pathetic Fallacy Series.

=== Filmmaking ===
In 1977 the film production company Phase Three Films, in which Maynard was a partner, produced its first feature-length movie Skin Deep. Directed by Geoff Steven and produced by Maynard, Skin Deep was the second feature supported by the New Zealand Film Commission, which had been set up in the same year.

Variety, Hollywood's trade magazine, said of the production, "No better launch for a fledgling film industry can be imagined". For Maynard it was the beginning of a long career in film production, distribution and industry support. In the mid-eighties, Maynard produced About Face, a series of half-hour dramas for television, with producer Bridget Ikin, as well as working with 27-year-old writer and director Vincent Ward. Through Maynard Productions, Maynard produced Vigil in 1983. The film was shot on and around Mount Messenger in north-eastern Taranaki, a location familiar to Maynard from his Govett-Brewster days.

Four years later Maynard and Gary Hannam co-produced The Navigator: A Medieval Odyssey through the production company Arenafilm that Maynard and director Robert Connolly had formed in 1987. Directed by Vincent Ward, Vigil was the first New Zealand film to be selected for competition at the Cannes Film Festival, and in 1988 Ward's film The Navigator: A Medieval Odyssey was the second New Zealand feature selected for official competition at Cannes. In New Zealand the film received 11 nominations at the New Zealand Film and TV Awards and went on to win all eleven, including Best Film and Director.

Maynard moved from New Zealand to Australia in 1989 and in the same year produced Jane Campion's first feature film, Sweetie, and co-produced An Angel at My Table with Bridget Ikin. This film was the first NZ feature selected for the New York Film Festival, and won the Silver Lion at the 1990 Venice Film Festival.

From the nineties, Maynard focused on the distribution and marketing of independent films which would otherwise have been limited to screenings in film festivals, through Footprint Films. Well-known films he has worked with through the company Footprint Films include Lee Tamahori's feature Once Were Warriors 1994 and Warwick Thornton's Samson & Delilah 2009. Footprint films was closed in 1998 after having distributed 14 New Zealand films, including Peter Jackson's third feature Braindead. In the 1990s, he mentored budding filmmaker Robert Connolly while he was still at film school, and Connolly later credited Maynard with having set his career "in motion".

In 2011 Maynard and Ikin combined their production and distribution skills and set up Felix Media. This specialist production company focuses on feature films made by visual artists and on media environments, including Angelica Mesiti's installation at the 2019 Venice Biennale. Films produced by Felix Media include Coral, a work for the fulldome screen, by Lynette Wallworth; three multi-screen works – Citizen's Band, The Calling, and In the ear of the tyrant by Angelica Mesiti; and the trilogy of adaptations by William Yang – Friends of Dorothy, My generation, and Bloodlinks.

== Awards ==
- 2003 Honorary master's degree, Australian Film, Television and Radio School
- 2005 Cecil Holmes Award from the Australian Directors' Guild

== Selected filmography ==
- Geoff Steven Strata 1983
- Vincent Ward Vigil 1984
- About Face 1986
- Jane Campion Sweetie 1989
- Jane Campion An Angel at my Table 1990 (Co-producer)
- Anna Campion Loaded 1994
- Gerard Lee All Men are Liars 1995
- Rowan Woods The Boys 1998
- Vincent Ward The Navigator 1998
- Robert Connolly The Bank 2001
- Richard Roxburgh Romulus my Father 2007
- Robert Connolly Balibo 2008
