= East West 101 =

Australian television series (2007–11)

- Logo of East West 101
- Genre: Drama
- Created by: Steve Knapman; Kris Wyld
- Directed by: Peter Andrikidis
- Starring: Don Hany; William McInnes; Susie Porter; Aaron Fa'aoso; Gerald Lepkowski; Daniela Farinacci; Renee Lim
- Composer: Guy Gross
- Country of origin: Australia
- Original language: English
- No. of seasons: 3
- No. of episodes: 20 (list of episodes)

Production
- Producers: Steve Knapman; Kris Wyld

Original release
- Network: SBS One
- Release: 6 December 2007 – 1 June 2011

East West 101 is an Australian drama series airing on the SBS network. The series was produced and created by Steven Knapman and Kris Wyld, the team behind other drama series such as Wildside and White Collar Blue. It ran for three seasons between 2007 and 2011.

East West 101 is set around the Major Crime Squad in metropolitan Sydney. It was based upon the experiences of actual detectives in a crime unit in Sydney's western suburbs. It was filmed on location, in Sydney suburbs such as Auburn, Bankstown, Redfern, Chinatown and Maroubra.

The series was made by SBS with the Film Finance Corporation Australia and the New South Wales Film and Television Office. It has been sold to Israel and other countries in the Middle East. The second season finished airing on 24 November 2009, and a third season was announced and filmed in 2010. It began airing on SBS One on 20 April 2011. The DVD of the third season was released on 4 May 2011.

== Cast ==
=== Main ===
- Don Hany as Detective Zane Malik
- Susie Porter as Detective Superintendent Patricia Wright
- Aaron Fa'aoso as Detective Sonny Koa
- Daniela Farinacci as Detective Helen Callas
- Renee Lim as Constable Jung Lim
- Matt Nable as Detective Neil Travis (season 3, credited as Matthew Nable)

=== Supporting ===
- Lucy Abroon as Yasmeen Malik
- Serhat Caradee as Oscar Catas (season 2)
- Richard Carter as Mick Deakin (season 2)
- Richard Cawthorne as Sterling (season 3)
- George Fayed as Amir Malik
- Dimitri Giameos as Ali El Babb (Season 1)
- Gyton Grantley as Craig Deakin (season 2)
- Taffy Hany as Rahman Malik
- Gerald Lepkowski as Agent Richard Skeritt (season 2)
- William McInnes as Detective Sergeant Ray Crowley (season 1)
- Irini Pappas as Mariam Malik (season 1)
- Tasneem Roc as Amina Malik
- Costa Ronin as Gregorovich (season 2)
- Damian de Montemas as Zimmer

=== Guests ===
- Aaron Jeffery as Hunter (3 episodes)
- Aaron Pedersen as Adam King (1 episode)
- Alyssa McClelland as Vesna Popov (1 episode)
- Daisy Betts as TV reporter (1 episode)
- Damian Walshe-Howling as Tony Caruso (1 episode)
- Denise Roberts as Janet Miller (1 episode)
- Firass Dirani as Talai (1 episode)
- Jacek Koman as Roman (2 episodes)
- John Brumpton as John Hunt (3 episodes)
- Josef Ber as Agent Doug Ford (6 episodes)
- Leon Ford as John Duff (1 episode)
- Malcolm Kennard as Edward Kirkbride (1 episode)
- Michael Denkha as Akmal Fahd
- Myles Pollard as John Woodhouse (1 episode)
- Nicole da Silva as Lily (1 episode)
- Osamah Sami as Latif Kazi (2 episodes)
- Richard Carter as Mick Deakin (5 episodes)
- Robert Mammone as Oliver Troy (6 episodes)
- Tammy MacIntosh as Sally Wilson (1 episode)
- Thom Green as Seth Rawlins (1 episode)
- Tony Nikolakopoulos as Omar (2 episodes)
- Tory Mussett as Karen Keeda (1 episode)
- Victoria Haralabidou as Helena Tadic / Saja (3 episodes)

== Plot ==
=== Season one ===
The first season centered around two detectives, Zane Malik (Don Hany), a Muslim and Ray Crowley (William McInnes), an Anglo-Australian, who are pitted against each other in a struggle for respect. They try to balance work with their own cultural and religious beliefs, which results in tension between cultures, egos and workmates. Recurring stories throughout the season include Malik's search for the man who shot his father and Crowley's struggle with his son's death. The cast also included Susie Porter as Inspector Patricia Wright, Aaron Fa'aoso as Detective Sonny Koa, Daniela Farinacci as Detective Helen Callas and Renee Lim as Jung Lim. Zane's father, Rahman Malik, is played by Taffy (Toffeek) Hany, the real life father of Don Hany.

=== Season two ===
In season two, detective Malik is caught up in the aftermath of a car bomb which has killed two men, and heralded the arrival of NSO Agent Richard Skeritt (Gerald Lepkowski). The attack seemingly has links to a Muslim terrorist threat that they work to uncover. Meanwhile, Patricia Wright navigates her tumultuous relationship with her family, including her unpredictable brother, Craig (Gyton Grantley) and father, Mick (Richard Carter). Helen Callas, heavily pregnant, Sonny Koa and Jung Lim also return, investigating crimes that cross cultural boundaries in Sydney's multicultural inner west.

=== Season three ===
Following a deadly armoured bank transport robbery by a highly organized team, Malik's wife Amina and son Amir are involved in a seemingly unrelated car accident. After Amir dies of an undetected aortic dissection, Malik takes the accident investigation personally.

== Reception ==
=== Australian ratings ===
Season	Timeslot	Season premiere	Season finale	Viewers
1st	Thursday 8:30pm	6 December 2007	10 January 2008	331,300
2nd	Tuesday 8:30pm	13 October 2009	24 November 2009	153,400

== Awards ==
=== AACTA Awards ===
Year	Category	Nominee	Series	Result	Ref
2008	Best Telefeature, Mini Series or Short Run Series			Won	
2008	Best Direction in Television	Peter Andrikidis		Nominated	
2008	Best Screenplay in Television	Kris Wyld		Nominated	
2008	Best Lead Actor in a Television Drama	Don Hany		Nominated	
2008	Best Lead Actor in a Television Drama	William McInnes		Nominated	
2008	Best Guest or Supporting Actor in a Television Drama	Taffy Hany		Nominated	
2009	Best Television Drama Series			Won	
2009	Best Direction in Television	Peter Andrikidis		Won	
2009	Best Lead Actress in a Television Drama	Susie Porter		Won	
2009	Best Screenplay in Television	Michael Miller and Kristen Dunphy		Nominated	
2009	Best Lead Actor in a Television Drama	Don Hany		Nominated	

=== Australian Directors Guild Awards ===
Year	Category	Nominee	Series	Result	Ref
2008	Best Direction Television Mini Series	Peter Andrikidis	—	Won	

=== Australian Writers Guild Awards ===
Year	Category	Nominee	Series	Result	Ref
2008	Television Mini Series - Original	Kristen Dunphy, Michael Miller, Kris Mrksa, Michelle Offen and Kris Wyld	—	Won	
2009	Television Mini Series - Original	Vanessa Bates, Kristen Dunphy, Michael Miller, Michelle Offen, David Ogilvy and Katherine Thomson	—	Nominated	

=== APRA-AGSC Screen Music Awards ===
Year	Category	Nominee	Series	Result	Ref
2008	Best Music for a Mini-Series or Telemovie	Guy Gross	—	Won	

=== Equity Awards ===
Year	Category	Nominee	Series	Result	Ref
2011	Most Outstanding Performance by an Ensemble in a Drama Series	Cast	—	Won	

=== Logie Awards ===
Year	Category	Nominee	Series	Result	Ref
2008	Most Outstanding Drama Series, Miniseries or Telemovie			Nominated	
2008	Most Outstanding Actor in a Drama Series	Don Hany		Nominated	
2008	Most Outstanding Actor in a Drama Series	William McInnes		Nominated	
2010	Most Outstanding Drama Series, Miniseries or Telemovie			Won	
2010	Most Outstanding Actor in a Drama Series	Don Hany		Won	
2010	Most Outstanding Actress in a Drama Series	Susie Porter		Nominated	
2012	Most Outstanding Actor in a Drama Series	Don Hany		Nominated	
