= Bertram Wainer =

Medical doctors from Melbourne (1928–1987)

- Born: Bertram Barney Wainer; 30 December 1928; Edinburgh, Scotland
- Died: 16 January 1987 (aged 58); Ararat, Victoria, Australia
- Occupation: Physician
- Spouse(s): Jo Wainer, Barbara Wainer
- Children: 5

Bertram Barney Wainer (30 December 1928 – 16 January 1987) was an Australian doctor who successfully campaigned for legal access to abortion for women in the state of Victoria. In the process he received multiple death threats from Victoria Police and survived at least three attempts on his life, including shootings and arson. He was also to uncover political and police corruption.

== Biography ==
Born in Edinburgh, Scotland (his father had died before his birth), he left school at thirteen and migrated to Australia eight years later with 2s 6d in his pocket. He did many odd jobs while attending night school and later the University of Melbourne, where he obtained his medical degree in 1958.

He became an army doctor in 1960 but resigned in 1966 as commander of a military hospital to go into private practice in St Kilda, Melbourne.

In 1967 a young woman came to Wainer's Melbourne surgery seeking emergency treatment after a back-yard abortion. For Wainer it marked the beginning of a long struggle to overturn laws that made abortion an offence punishable by up to fifteen years in jail.

The campaign of Wainer and others came to a head in 1969. Dr. Ken Davidson had been charged under the existing abortion law. After police began questioning women from patient files seized in a raid on the doctor's surgery, on 20 May 1969, Wainer placed an advertisement in the mass circulation The Sun News-Pictorial; under the heading 'Abortion Abortion Abortion' the ad called on women "not be intimidated by bullying or intimidatory tactics [of the police]".

On 3 June 1969, in a landmark decision R v Davidson, Dr. Davidson was acquitted; the court decision said, in part, that abortion could be legal under the following conditions: it was "(a) necessary to preserve the woman from a serious danger to her life or her physical or mental health which the continuance of the pregnancy would entail; and (b) in circumstances not out of proportion to the danger to be averted".

A few weeks after this Wainer surrendered himself to police and "confessed" to performing an abortion, thus testing the new legal framework and bringing publicity to the decision in the Davidson case. (Before that time Wainer had not performed abortions; this was one of the reasons he could be such a prominent advocate for change since he had not committed a 'crime'). Soon after this all the doctors charged with performing abortions were acquitted or proceedings were dropped.

Wainer also raised allegations of police corruption in protecting back-yard abortion rackets. His claims were published in stories written by journalist Evan Whitton in Melbourne's Truth newspaper. On 9 December 1969 a series of affidavits was handed to the Solicitor-General, Basil Murray QC. They alleged that police were protecting doctors as well as back-yard abortionists, including Charles Wyatt, a former Victorian police officer.

During the six months Wainer had been campaigning, Jack Ford had been promoted to the head of the Homicide squad. An inquiry which commenced in early 1970 headed by William Kaye QC revealed an institutionalised and systematic graft dating back to about 1953, and resulted in Ford and another Superintendent, Jack Matthews, being jailed for five years. Martin Jacobsen, a constable, was jailed for three years.

Wainer opened the Fertility Control Clinic in East Melbourne in 1972: the first in Australia where public access to abortion could be obtained with no upfront fees.

He wrote a book about his experiences, "It Isn't Nice", that was published in 1972.

In October 1974, Wainer presented the solicitor-general with a secretly-made tape recording of a senior sergeant talking to a minor criminal. He alleged that the conversation indicated that the policeman had accepted a bribe. After some initial inquiries had been made, the Hamer government set up an inquiry headed by Barry Beach, QC. It found that the health of the force was "not well". However, only 33 of the 55 police named by Beach were charged and all of them were acquitted.

In 1975, Wainer was interviewed on ABC TV's The Norman Gunston Show.

He ran for the seat of Casey in the 1980 election, achieving 3.97% of the vote.

He died of a heart attack in 1987 at Ararat, Victoria.

== Documentary and telemovie ==
Wainer's life has been the subject of a documentary, Abortion, Corruption and Cops – The Bertram Wainer Story (2005, 52 mins) and a telemovie, Dangerous Remedy (2012, first broadcast 4 November 2012).
