= David Caesar =

Australian film director

David Caesar (born 1963) is an Australian television and film director and writer. He grew up in Turlinjah on the south coast of NSW and attended school in nearby Moruya where he was school captain in his senior year.

Caesar graduated from the Australian Film Television and Radio School in 1987. He won an AWGIE and best director at Shanghai Film Festival for his film MULLET. He won a Queensland Premiers Literary award for the screenplay for PRIME MOVER in 2008.

== Television credits ==
- Dangerous (TV series)
- RAN Remote Area Nurse (TV series)
- Fireflies (TV series)
- CrashBurn
- Bad Cop, Bad Cop
- Water Rats
- Stingers
- All Saints (TV series)
- Wildside (Australian TV series)
- Halifax f.p.
- Twisted Tales (TV series)
- The Feds (telemovie)
- Bananas in Pyjamas
- K-9 (TV series) – Regeneration (Series 1; Episode 1)
- K-9 (TV series) – Liberation (Series 1; Episode 2)
- Rush (TV series)
- Razor (TV series)
- Cops LAC (TV series)
- Phryne Fisher (TV series)
- NCIS: Sydney

== Film credits ==
- Greenkeeping (1992)
- Idiot Box (1996)
- Mullet (2001)
- Dirty Deeds (2002)
- Prime Mover (2009)
- Nowhere Boys: The Book of Shadows (2016)
