= Steve Starling =

Australian sports fishing writer and television personality

Steve (Starlo) Starling is an Australian sports fishing writer and television personality who has appeared in many of Rex Hunt's Fishing Adventure programs on the Seven Network.

He has published twenty books on the subject of angling, as well as thousands of magazine articles.

Starlo has scripted and presented many instructional videos and DVDs, and been a Researcher and on-screen presenter for a number of Australian angling and outdoor television programs.

Starlo is also an occasional guest on various radio angling chat shows and a regular on ABC Radio's "Big Fish".
