= Look Both Ways (2005 film) =

- Promotional release poster
- Directed by: Sarah Watt
- Written by: Sarah Watt
- Produced by: Andrew Myer; Barbara Masel; Bridget Ikin; Vicki Sugars
- Starring: William McInnes; Justine Clarke; Anthony Hayes
- Cinematography: Ray Argall
- Edited by: Denise Haratzis
- Music by: Amanda Brown; Ashley Klose
- Distributed by: Madman Entertainment (Australia)
- Release date: 18 August 2005
- Running time: 100 minutes
- Country: Australia
- Box office: $2.5 million

Look Both Ways is a 2005 Australian drama film, written and directed by Sarah Watt, starring an ensemble cast, which was released on 18 August 2005. The film was supported by the Adelaide Film Festival Investment Fund and opened the 2005 Adelaide Film Festival. It won four AFI Awards, including Best Film and Best Direction. The film was selected as a film text by the Victorian Curriculum and Assessment Authority for the VCE English Course from 2007 to 2010.

== Plot ==
The film charts the stories of several people over a hot summer weekend in Adelaide. Photojournalist Nick (William McInnes) discovers he has testicular cancer that has spread to his lungs. On his way home he goes to the site of a train accident to report on it, and meets Meryl (Justine Clarke) an emotionally vulnerable artist, who has witnessed a man get run over by a train. Over the course of the weekend, their relationship develops sexually as another chance encounter allows them to discover more about each other; the two gradually allow themselves to let go of their fears and form a meaningful relationship.

Meanwhile, Nick's colleague, Andy Walker, has to deal with the news that his estranged girlfriend, Anna, is pregnant, made more difficult because neither of them really wanted or planned for a baby. Andy also has to cope with his ex-wife, who doesn't trust his ability to take good care of his two children. The lives of Julia (the partner of the man run over by the train) and the driver of the train are explored: Both characters are shown going through the seven stages of grief. The train driver bridges the gap with his estranged teenage son during the course of the movie. The rain at the end of the film symbolises relief.

The film ends with a flick-through montage of events: Nick in hospital, suffering the effects of treatment, Nick and Meryl's child, finally holidaying in Europe; enjoying whatever time they have left together.

== Cast ==
- William McInnes as Nick
- Justine Clarke as Meryl Lee
- Anthony Hayes as Andy Walker
- Lisa Flanagan as Anna
- Andrew Gilbert as Phil
- Daniella Farinacci as Julia
- Maggie Dence as Joan
- Edwin Hodgeman as Jim
- Andreas Sobik as Train Driver
- Alex Rafalowicz as Train Driver's Son
- Sacha Horler as Linda
- Robbie Hoad as Rob (Train Victim)
- Mary Kostakidis as SBS Newsreader

== Awards ==
- 2004 Won Queensland Premier's Literary Awards Film Script – the Pacific Film and Television Commission Award for Sarah Watt
- 2005 Won Toronto International Film Festival: Discovery Award, Sarah Watt
- 2005 Won Australian Film Institute Awards: Best Film, Best Direction, Best Original Screenplay, and Best Supporting Actor (Anthony Hayes)
- 2005 Nominated Australian Film Institute Awards: Best Costume Design, Best Editing, Best Lead Actor (William McInnes), Best Lead Actress (Justine Clarke), Best Production Design, Best Sound, and Best Supporting Actress (Daniella Farinacci)
- 2005 Won Brisbane International Film Festival: FIPRESCI award, Sarah Watt
- 2005 Won Inside Film Awards: Best Direction, Best Script, and Best Editing
- 2005 Nominated Inside Film Awards: Best Actress (Justine Clarke), Best Feature Film, Best Music, and Best Sound
- 2005 Nominated European Film Awards: Screen International Award, Sarah Watt
- 2005 Won Film Critics Circle of Australia Awards: Best Film, Best Director, Best Actor in a Lead Role for (William McInnes), Best Original Screenplay and Best Editor
- 2005 Nominated Film Critics Circle of Australia Awards: Best Actress in Lead Role (Justine Clarke), Best Actress in Supporting Role (Lisa Flanagan), and Best Musical Score
- 2006 Won Australian Screen Directors' Association: Best Direction of a First Feature Film
- 2006 Won NatFilm Festival: Critics Award, Sarah Watt
- 2006 Won International Film Festival Rotterdam KNF Award, Sarah Watt
- 2006 Won Motovun Film Festival — Propeller Award (Grand Prize), Sarah Watt
- 2006 Won Golden Trailer Awards: Most Original Foreign Trailer
- 2006 Won Mar del Plata Film Festival: Best Script (Sarah Watt), Best actress (Justine Clarke)
- 2006 Nominated Mar del Plata Film Festival: Best Film

== Box office ==
Look Both Ways grossed $2,969,712 at the box office in Australia.

== See also ==
- Cinema of Australia
- List of Australian films
- South Australian Film Corporation
