= Dirty Deeds (2002 film) =

- Directed by: David Caesar
- Written by: David Caesar
- Produced by: Bryan Brown
- Starring: Bryan Brown; Toni Collette; John Goodman; Sam Neill; Sam Worthington; Andrew Sommerich
- Production companies: Nine Films and Television; Macquarie Film Corporation
- Distributed by: Hoyts Distribution
- Release date: 18 July 2002
- Running time: 110 minutes
- Country: Australia
- Language: English
- Budget: A$3 million
- Box office: A$5 million

Dirty Deeds is a 2002 film shot in Australia. It was directed by noted fringe director David Caesar and stars Bryan Brown, Toni Collette, Sam Neill, Sam Worthington, John Goodman and Andrew Sommerich and produced by Nine Films and Television, the film and television production arm of the Nine Network, owned by PBL Media, now Nine Entertainment Co.

== Plot ==
Barry Ryan is a late 1960s Australian mobster who controls the Sydney gambling scene and is making huge profits from casino slot machines. His profitable venture attracts the unwanted attention of the American Mafia, who attempt to secure a piece of the action by sending in two of their henchmen: the pensive, world-weary veteran Tony and his violent, not-too-bright sidekick Sal. Ryan's arch-rival Freddy tries to take over the clubs with his own machines. Ryan's nephew Darcy returns from fighting in Vietnam and starts working for him but Darcy doesn't know what he's in for. Ryan soon finds himself fending off the trigger-happy "yanks", outback-style, while also contending with his feisty wife Sharon, needy mistress Margaret, and crooked detective-sergeant Ray (Sam Neill).

The movie is inspired by the visit of Mafia identity JosephTesta to Australia where he met Lennie McPherson and other Australian underworld figures.

== Cast ==
- Bryan Brown as Barry Ryan
- Toni Collette as Sharon Ryan
- John Goodman as Tony Testano
- Sam Neill as Detective Sergeant Ray Murphy
- Sam Worthington as Darcy Ryan
- Andrew Sommerich as Jason Ryan
- Kestie Morassi as Margaret
- William McInnes as Tom "Hollywood" Reilly
- Andrew S. Gilbert as Peter "Norm" Maloney
- Shane McNamara as U.S. Airport Official
- Felix Williamson as Sal Cassela
- Gary Waddell as Freddie
- Bille Brown as Senator McGovers
- Joanne Cahill as Beryl (credited as Jo-Anne Cahill)
- Paul Chubb as Sammy
- Ray Devitt as Bill
- Gabriel Egan as Steve "Stevo"
- Toni Jaye as Samantha
- Anthony Jensen as "Goose"
- Anthony Johnsen as Trevor "Trev"
- David Morris as Jimmy Santori
- Terry Serio as Danny

== Production ==
A subplot revolved on Darcy starting a pizza business, and Worthington made pizza on the cooking show Fresh to promote the film.

== Music and soundtrack ==
The soundtrack for the film was produced by Tim Rogers who also wrote much of the original music.

At the ARIA Music Awards of 2002 the soundtrack was nominated for Best Original Soundtrack Album.

=== Track listing ===
1. "Dirty Deeds Done Dirt Cheap" by You Am I with Tex Perkins – 3:55
2. "Titles Sequence" by Paul Healy – 0:47
3. "And I Heard the Fire Sing" by Grinspoon – 2:59
4. "Trouble" by You Am I with Bernard Fanning – 5:37
5. "New Flat" by Paul Healy – 1:28
6. "I'll Be Gone" by Palladium - 3:54
7. "Sometimes I Just Don't Know" by You Am I with Billy Thorpe – 5:15
8. "Wild About You" by Dallas Crane – 2:44
9. "No Good Without You" by Bernard Fanning And Bruce Haymes – 4:30
10. "Making Pizza" by Paul Kelly – 1:25
11. "Draggin' Yer Bones" by You Am I – 3:29
12. "Everlovin' Man" by The Loved Ones – 2:08
13. "Made My Bed, Gonna Lie in It" by You Am I With Phil Jamieson – 3:00
14. "Washboard Rock'n'Roll" by Lisa Miller, Jody Bell And Tim Rogers – 1:47
15. "Black and Blue" by Powder Monkeys -4:25
16. "Calendar Eyes" by You Am I – 4:01
17. "Bom Bom" by Daddy Cool – 2:33
18. "Losin' My Blues Tonight" by Tim Rogers and Lisa Miller – 2:43
19. "Plane Leaves" by Paul Healy – 1:26

== Box office ==
Dirty Deeds grossed $5,083,187 at the box office in Australia.

== Home media ==
In America, the film was distributed by DEJ Productions and released on DVD by Paramount Home Entertainment on 4 November 2003.

== See also ==
- Cinema of Australia
