= William McInnes =

Australian actor

- Born: 1963 or 1964
- Occupations: Actor; author
- Years active: 1988–present
- Spouse: Sarah Watt (1993–2011; her death)
- Children: 2

Darrell William McInnes (born 1963 or 1964) is an Australian film and television actor and writer. He is best known for his roles as Senior Constable Nick Schultz in Blue Heelers, as Max Connors in SeaChange, and as TV boss Lindsay Cunningham in The Newsreader and Dr. Roy Penrose in NCIS: Sydney.

== Early life and education ==
Darrell William McInnes was born in 1963 or 1964.

He earned a Bachelor of Arts degree at the Rockhampton campus of the Capricornia Institute of Advanced Education (now Central Queensland University) in 1985. He studied drama at the Western Australian Academy of Performing Arts (WAAPA) and graduated in 1988.

== Career ==
=== Television ===
After a recurring role in A Country Practice in 1990, McInnes appeared in series such as Bligh, Ocean Girl, Good Vibrations and Snowy before making his name as Senior Constable Nick Schultz on Blue Heelers in 1993. McInnes appeared in the show until 1998, when he left to focus on other work. In 1999, he joined the cast of SeaChange as Max Connors, the new love interest of the main character Laura Gibson (Sigrid Thornton) after Diver Dan (David Wenham) left the series.

In 2001, he starred in an episode of Halifax f.p.. In 2002, McInnes was part of the cast of Marshall Law, which was cancelled after one season; and he returned for several episodes of Blue Heelers in 2004 and 2005. He also had a recurring role as Rosie's sleazy ex Colin in 2003's CrashBurn; and a noted comic turn as Sandy Freckle in two episodes of Kath & Kim, under the pseudonym "Rock Hampton". In 2006 he completed the telemovie Stepfather of the Bride.

McInnes was the first guest host of Let Loose Live on 29 May 2005; the show was axed by the Seven Network after just two weeks. He also appeared as himself on Micallef Tonight on the Nine Network but it was also quickly axed. McInnes lent his voice for the Nine Network factual series The Code: Crime and Justice. He is sometimes credited as "Rock Hampton" (e.g. in Kath & Kim and the 2005 film You and Your Stupid Mate), as a nod to his university time spent in the city of the same name. In 2007, he played the title role in the telemovie Curtin.

In late 2007, he had a leading role in Season 1 of SBS's East West 101. In 2008, he also appeared in Network Ten's telemovie The Informant. He portrayed the historical person, Jack Ford, in the ABC drama Dangerous Remedy (2012). In 2023, McInnes started to play AFP Forensic Pathologist Dr Roy Penrose in the Network 10/Paramount+ series NCIS: Sydney.

=== Film ===
Early film roles include My Brother Jack (2001), Do Or Die (2001), Dirty Deeds (2002) and the TV Movie The Shark Net (2003).

McInnes featured in the lead role in Look Both Ways (2005), directed by his wife Sarah Watt. Subsequent film roles include in 2006 Irresistible, with Susan Sarandon, and Kokoda, the lead role in the romantic drama Unfinished Sky in 2007, and in 2009 Prime Mover, featuring Michael Dorman, Ben Mendelsohn and Anthony Hayes, and Sarah Watt's follow-up film My Year Without Sex.

=== Radio ===
In December 2016, McInnes hosted Summer Afternoons across ABC Local Radio.

=== Writing ===
McInnes released his first book A Man's Got to Have a Hobby on 1 August 2005. His second book Cricket Kings was released in 2006 and his third, That'd Be Right, in August 2008. His fourth book, The Making of Modern Australia, was released in 2010; it was accompanied by a television documentary series of the same name on the ABC that McInnes narrated. In 2011 he released his fifth book, Worse Things Happen at Sea, co-written by his wife Sarah Watt. In 2014 he released Holidays, a collection of stories loosely based around his and other people's holidays. He wrote a regular column called "William Tells" for The Australian Women's Weekly.

=== Other activities ===
On 16 February 2009, John Faulkner, then Special Minister of State and Cabinet Secretary, appointed McInnes as the new chair of the Advisory Council of the Museum of Australian Democracy at Old Parliament House. McInnes has spoken in many of his media appearances about the museum and its work and the importance of democratic values and civics education. He succeeded Doug Anthony as chair of the council.

== Filmography ==
William McInnes' film appearances
Year	Title	Role	Notes	Ref.
2023	Rhyme Time	Harold	Short	
2010	The Hopes & Dreams of Gazza Snell	Gazza Snell		
2009	Blessed	Peter	Feature film	
2009	Prime Mover	Phil	Feature film	
2009	My Year Without Sex	Radio voice	Feature film	
2007	Unfinished Sky	John Woldring	Feature film	
2006	Kokoda 39th Battalion	The Colonel	Feature film	
2006	Irresistible	Jimmy	Feature film	
2005	Laughing Stock	Scout Master		
2005	You and Your Stupid Mate	Peter Rossiter	Feature film (as Rock Hampton)	
2005	Look Both Ways	Nick	Feature film	
2002	Dirty Deeds	Hollywood	Feature film	
2002	Living with Happiness	Father	Short film	
2000	The Way of the Birds	Voice	Short film	
2000	Brother	Narrator	Short film	
1999	Cousin	Narrator	Short film	
1996	Uncle	Narrator	Short film	
1993	Body Melt	Paul Matthews	Feature film	
1993	The Heartbreak Kid	Southgate	Feature film	
1993	Broken Highway	Roger	Feature film	
1992	Turtle Beach	Minder	Feature film	
1991	Dead to the World	Vince	Feature film	
1991	The Last Crop	Real Estate Agent		
1990	Catch of the Day	All Male Voices	Short film	
1990	Wendy Cracked a Walnut	Ralph	Feature film	

William McInnes' television appearances
Year	Title	Role	Notes	Ref.
2023–present	NCIS: Sydney	Dr. Roy 'Rosie' Penrose	Main Role	
2021-25	The Newsreader	Lindsay Cunningham	TV series, 18 episodes	
2019-2021	Total Control	Laurie Martin	TV series, 10 episodes	
2018	Rake	Gareth Morrow	TV series, 7 episodes	
2016	Deep Water	Chief Inspector Peel	TV series, 4 episodes	
2013-14	The Time of our Lives	Matt Tivolli	TV series, 21 episodes	
2012	Dangerous Remedy	Jack Ford	TV movie	
2011	The Slap	Narrator	TV miniseries, 8 episodes	
2008	The Informant	Richard Button	TV movie	
2007-08	East West 101	Det Sgt Ray Crowley	TV series, 6 episodes	
2007	Curtin	John Curtin	TV movie	
2006	Stepfather of the Bride	Daniel	TV movie	
1994-2005	Blue Heelers	Sgt Nick Schutlz	TV series, 213 episodes	
2003	Kath & Kim	Sandy Freckle	TV series, 2 episodes	
2003	CrashBurn	Colin	TV miniseries, 4 episodes	
2003	The Shark Net	Roy Drewe	TV series, 3 episodes	
2003	Welcher & Welcher	Sir Robert Jefferson	TV series, 1 episode	
2002	Marshall Law	Dylan Boyd QC	TV series, 17 episodes	
2002	Animated Tales of the World	Harvey (voice)	Animated TV series, 1 episode	
2001	Halifax f.p.	Jeremy Buckle	TV series, 1 episode	
2001	Do or Die	Daryl Quint	TV miniseries, 2 episodes	
2001	My Brother Jack	Mr. Meredith	TV movie	
1999-2000	SeaChange	Max Connors	TV series, 24 episodes	
2000	The Lost World	Hans Dressler	TV miniseries, 1 episode	
1994	Ocean Girl	Commander Lucas	TV series, 13 episodes	
1993	Snowy	Max Heimer	TV series, 13 episodes	
1992	Bligh	John MacArthur	TV series, 13 episodes	
1992	Embassy	John Hancock	TV series, 1 episode	
1992	Good Vibrations	David Chester	TV miniseries, 2 episodes	
1991	The Flying Doctors	Jerry Davis	TV series, 1 episode	
1991	Rafferty's Rules	Craig Farner	TV series, 1 episode	
1990	Shadows of the Heart	Denny Taylor	TV miniseries, 2 episodes	
1990	Col'n Carpenter	David	TV series, 2 episodes	
1990	A Country Practice	John Freeman	TV series, 2 episodes	

== Theatre ==
William McInnes' stage performances
Year	Title	Role	Notes	Ref.
1988	The Rising of Pete Marsh		New Fortune Theatre, Perth	
1989	Operation Holy Mountain		Seymour Centre with Toe Truck Theatre	
1989	Kid Stakes		Bridge Theatre, Coniston with Theatre South	
1991	Bali: Adat		Fairfax Studio with MTC for Melbourne International Arts Festival	
1991	Hay Fever	Sandy Tyrell	Playhouse, Melbourne with MTC	
1994	Loot		Mietta's, Melbourne	
1994	See How they Run		Mietta's, Melbourne	
1996	Private Lives	Victor Prynne	Fairfax Studio, Melbourne with MTC	
1999	Pride and Prejudice	Mr Darcy	Playhouse, Melbourne with MTC, Sydney Opera House with STC	
2001	Art	Serge	Playhouse, Melbourne with MTC, Regal Theatre, Perth with Black Swan State Theatre Company	
2001	Don Juan		Sydney Opera House with STC	
2003	Blithe Spirit		Playhouse, Melbourne with MTC	
2006	Ray's Tempest	Ray Brink	Fairfax Studio with MTC	
2009	My Fair Lady	Henry Higgins	Civic Theatre, Auckland with Opera Australia	
2009	Equus	Martin Dysart	His Majesty's Theatre, Perth with Perth Theatre Company	
2014	The Effect	Toby	Southbank Theatre with MTC	
2015	The Waiting Room	Karl	Fairfax Studio, Melbourne with MTC	
2018	An Ideal Husband	The Earl of Caversham, KG	Playhouse, Melbourne	
2018	Nearer the Gods	King Charles II	Bille Brown Theatre with Queensland Theatre	
2018	The Silent Anzac		Australia House, London	
2019	33 Variations	Beethoven	Comedy Theatre, Melbourne	
2020; 2022	The Heartbreak Choir	Peter	Southbank Theatre, Melbourne & Online with MTC	

== Recognition, awards and nominations ==
William McInnes' accolades
Year	Nominated work	Award	Category	Result	Ref.
1997	Blue Heelers	Logie Awards	Most Outstanding Actor	Nominated	
1998	Blue Heelers	Logie Awards	Most Outstanding Actor	Nominated	
2000	SeaChange	Logie Awards	Most Outstanding Actor	Won	
2001	SeaChange	Logie Awards	Most Outstanding Actor	Nominated	
2001	SeaChange	Logie Awards	Most Popular Actor	Nominated	
2001	My Brother Jack	AFI Awards	Best Actor in a Telemovie	Nominated	
2001	SeaChange	AFI Awards	Best Actor in a Television Series	Nominated	
2002	My Brother Jack	Logie Awards	Most Outstanding Actor	Won	
2004	The Shark Net	Logie Awards	Most Outstanding Actor	Nominated	
2005	Look Both Ways	AFI Awards	Best Lead Actor	Won	
2008	East West 101	Logie Awards	Most Outstanding Actor	Won	
2008	Unfinished Sky	50th AFI Awards	Best Actor in a Leading Role	Won	
2008	East West 101	AFI Awards	Best Lead Actor	Won	
2009	William McInnes	Q150	Q150 Icons Influential Artist	Honoured	
2010	William McInnes	Central Queensland University	Honorary Doctorate	Honoured	
2010	William McInnes	WAAPA	Fellow	Honoured	

== Personal life ==
McInnes was married to animator and director Sarah Watt. They had two children, Clem and Stella. Sarah Watt died of cancer in 2011.

== Written works ==
=== Non-fiction ===
- McInnes, William (2005). A Man's Got to Have a Hobby : Long Summers with My Dad (1st ed.). Hodder Australia. ISBN 978-0-7336-2078-2.
- —— (2008). That'd Be Right : A Fairly True History of Modern Australia. Hachette Livre. ISBN 978-0-7336-2253-3.
- —— (2010). The Making of Modern Australia (1st ed.). Hachette Australia. ISBN 978-0-7336-2494-0.
- with Watt, Sarah (2012). Worse Things Happen at Sea. Hachette Australia. ISBN 978-0-7336-2802-3.
- —— (2014). Holidays. Hachette Australia. ISBN 978-0-7336-3312-6.
- —— (2016). Full Bore. Hachette Australia. ISBN 978-0-7336-3553-3.
- —— (2018). Fatherhood : Stories about Being a Dad. Hachette Australia. ISBN 978-0-7336-3555-7.
- — — (2023). Yeah, Nah! : A celebration of life and the words that make us who we are. Hachette Australia. ISBN 978-0-7336-5065-9.

=== Fiction ===
- McInnes, William (2006). Cricket Kings (1st ed.). Hachette Livre Australia. ISBN 978-0-7336-2049-2.
- —— (2012). The Laughing Clowns. Hachette Australia. ISBN 978-0-7336-2409-4.
- —— (2013). The Birdwatcher. Hachette Australia. ISBN 978-0-7336-3043-9.
