= Film Critics Circle of Australia =

Association of film critics and reviewers

The Film Critics Circle of Australia (FCCA) is an association of cinema critics and reviewers. It includes journalists in "media, television, major national and state papers, radio, national and state, online and freelance writers, Australian representatives from international magazines..and local specialist film magazines", and is based in Sydney.

The FCCA Annual Awards for Australian Film, rewarding makers of feature films and documentaries is highly regarded.

== History ==
The Sydney Film Critics' Circle became a national organisation as the Film Critics' Circle of Australia by October 1988. It joined International Federation of Film Critics (FIPRESCI), "which will allow its members to be considered for jury duty at international festivals, accreditation at festivals and markets."

The FCCA Awards have been presented each year since September 1988, with the inaugural winners including two awards each for The Year My Voice Broke: best director (John Duigan) and best male actor (Noah Taylor); and Shame: best screenplay (Beverly Blankenship and Michael Brindley) and best female actor (Deborra-Lee Furness).

=== 2019 ===
In 2019, the categories were Best Film, Best Director/Universal Pictures Award; Best Actor / Toil Films Award; Best Actress; Best Cinematography; Best Original Score / AGSC Award; Best Screenplay (Original Or Adapted) / Bunya Productions Award; Best Editor; Best Actor Supporting Role; Best Actress Supporting Role / MB Films Award;Best Feature Documentary / Kudos Knowledge Award.

== Presidents ==
Presidents of the FCCA have included:

- 1991–1993: Sandra Hall
- 1994–1996: Peter Crayford
- 1997–2000: John Hanrahan
- 2001–2003: Julie Rigg
- 2004–2006: Russell Edwards
- 2007–2010: Paolo Remati
- 2011–2014: Rod Quinn
- 2015–2016: Russell Edwards
- 2017–2020: Rose Capp
- 2020–2024: C. J. Johnson
- 2024–current (as of September 2020): Simon Foster

== See also ==
- Film Critics Circle of Australia Awards 2004
- Film Critics Circle of Australia Awards 2005
- Film Critics Circle of Australia Awards 2006
- Film Critics Circle of Australia Awards 2011
- List of film awards
