= List of Australian films of 2011 =

== 2011 ==
Title	Director	Cast	Genre	Notes
33 Postcards	Pauline Chan	Guy Pearce	Drama	
Black & White & Sex	John Winter	Katherine Hicks	Drama	
Boronia Boys	Timothy Spanos	Cameron Nugent, Tim Burns, Maxine Klibingaitis, Desiree Smith, Elspeth Ballantyne, Reylene Pearce, Kylie Foster	Comedy	
The Cup	Simon Wincer	Brendan Gleeson, Stephen Curry, Daniel MacPherson, Jodi Gordon	Drama	
Don't Be Afraid of the Dark	Matthew Robbins, Guillermo del Toro	Guy Pearce, Katie Holmes, Bailee Madison	Horror	
The Dragon Pearl	Mario Andreacchio	Sam Neill	Family adventure	
The Economics of Happiness	Helena Norberg-Hodge, Steven Gorelick, John Page		Documentary	
The Eye of the Storm	Fred Schepisi	Judy Davis, Geoffrey Rush, Charlotte Rampling	Drama	
Face to Face	Michael Rymer	Vince Colosimo, Luke Ford, Matthew Newton, Sigrid Thornton	Drama	
The Family Tree	Vivi Friedman	Christina Hendricks	Comedy	
A Few Best Men	Stephan Elliott	Laura Brent, Xavier Samuel	Comedy	
A Heartbeat Away	Gale Edwards	William Zappa, Sebastian Gregory, Tammy MacIntosh, Isabel Lucas	Comedy	
Here I Am	Beck Cole			
The Hunter	Daniel Nettheim	Willem Dafoe, Sam Neill	Drama	
Killer Elite	Gary McKendry	Jason Statham, Clive Owen, Robert De Niro	Action	
Mad Bastards	Brendan Fletcher		Drama	
Mrs Carey's Concert	Bob Connolly	Sophie Raymond	Documentary	
The Palace	Anthony Maras	Erol Afşin	Short drama	
Perished	Aaron McCann, Stefan Radanovich	Wayne Davies	Short drama	
Red Dog	Kriv Stenders	Rachael Taylor, Josh Lucas, Noah Taylor	Family, adventure	
Sanctum	Alister Grierson	Richard Roxburgh, Ioan Gruffudd, Rhys Wakefield	Action	
Sleeping Beauty	Julia Leigh	Emily Browning	Erotic drama	
Snowtown	Justin Kurzel	Daniel Henshall	Crime	
The Story of Short Stack	Andy Clemmensen	Shaun Diviney, Andy Clemmensen, Bradie Webb	Documentary	
Toomelah	Ivan Sen		Drama	
The Tunnel	Carlo Ledesma		Horror	
X	Jon Hewitt	Viva Bianca	Crime	

== See also ==
- 2011 in Australia
- 2011 in Australian television
- List of 2011 box office number-one films in Australia
