= 1st AACTA Awards =

Australian film and television awards ceremony

- Date: 15 January 2012 and 31 January 2012
- Site: Westin Hotel and Sydney Opera House; Sydney, New South Wales
- Hosted by: No host
- Produced by: John Leahey (executive producer)

Highlights
- Best Film: Red Dog
- Most awards: Snowtown (6)
- Most nominations: The Hunter (14)

Television coverage
- Network: Nine Network
- Duration: 2 hours
- Ratings: 314,000

The Inaugural Australian Academy of Cinema and Television Arts Awards, known more commonly as the AACTA Awards, presented by the Australian Academy of Cinema and Television Arts (AACTA), honoured the best Australian and foreign films of 2011 took place on two separate events, in Sydney, New South Wales: the AACTA Awards Luncheon, on 15 January 2012, at the Westin Hotel, and the AACTA Awards Ceremony, on 31 January 2012, at the Sydney Opera House. Following the establishment of the Australian Academy of Cinema and Television Arts, by the Australian Film Institute (AFI), these awards marked the inauguration of the AACTA Awards, but served as a continuum to the AFI Awards, which were presented by the AFI since 1958. The ceremony was televised on the Nine Network.

The nominees for the non-feature award categories were announced on 30 August 2011, and all other non-feature film, feature film and television nominees were announced at the National Institute of Dramatic Art (NIDA) on 30 November. The academy presented awards for achievements in foreign film, and announced the nominees at the AACTA Awards Luncheon.

== Background ==
On 18 August 2011, the Australian Academy of Cinema and Television Arts (AACTA) was established by the Australian Film Institute (AFI), to raise the profile of Australian film and television in Australia and abroad, and to change the way it rewards talent from its previous jury system, to the more recognised and understood elements of foreign film organisations. These awards will serve as a continuum to the Australian Film Institute Awards, which were presented by the Australian Film Institute. A gold statuette was created by Australian sculptor Ron Gomboc, which depicts "a human silhouette based on the shape of the Southern Cross constellation." The nominees and winners were determined by the academy's fifteen Chapters, which comprise screen professionals from industry guilds and organisations including actors, directors, producers and screenwriters, who each decide the nominees in their individual fields and then vote for the winners of each category. The president of the awards is Australian actor Geoffrey Rush.

Works entered between 7 October 2010 and 2 November 2011 for films, and 5 May 2010 and 24 May 2011 for short films and documentaries were eligible for awards. The films in competition for the inaugural awards were revealed at the announcement of the academy, with twenty-three Australian feature films originally slated to compete for awards, but it was eventually brought down to twenty-one, when two of the films, Burning Man and The Dragon Pearl, could no longer compete due to a change in their release dates. The films were showcased at the inaugural Festival of Film from 6 October – 14 November in Sydney and Melbourne, for the general public, and for Academy and AFI members to view and judge. The first nominees were announced on 30 August 2011, for non-feature film categories: Best Feature Length Documentary, Best Short Animation and Best Short Fiction Film. Round one voting for feature film categories commenced on 2 November and ended on 16 November. Following the announcement of the nominees on 30 November, round two voting commenced to determine the winners in each category, and ended on 14 December 2011. The first award to be announced was the Longford Lyell Award, which was presented to cinematographer Don McAlpine, at the AACTA awards luncheon, and marked the first award presented by the academy since its inception. On 30 November 2011, the rest of the non-feature films, along with the entire feature film and television nominees, were announced at the National Institute of Dramatic Art in Sydney, and was hosted by Adam Elliot. Foreign films were also recognised at the AACTA International Awards ceremony, which handed out awards for Best Film, Best Direction, Best Screenplay, Best Actor and Best Actress. The nominees were announced at the AACTA Awards Luncheon on 15 January 2011, in conjunction with the Australia Week Black Tie Gala, and the winners were determined by a jury.

== Ceremonies ==
The awards were presented over three separate events: the AACTA Awards Luncheon, at the Westin Hotel on 15 January 2012 and the AACTA Awards Ceremony, at the Sydney Opera House, in Sydney, New South Wales on 31 January 2012; and on 27 January, the AACTA International Awards at Soho House, West Hollywood, Los Angeles. The luncheon presented awards in film production, television, all non-feature film categories and the Longford Lyell Award; all other feature film and television awards were handed out at the ceremony; and the International awards presented accolades for films produced outside of Australia, regardless of geography.^{[A]} This marks the first time in ten years since the awards have been presented in Sydney, which had been held in Melbourne previously. The awards date has been shifted from its usual November/December date, to January 2012, to align them with the international film awards season. The awards ceremony was broadcast by the Nine Network.

== Special awards ==
During the AACTA Awards luncheon, special non-competitive awards were handed out to individuals for their contribution to the Australian screen industry. The Longford Lyell Award, a lifetime achievement award, was presented to Don McAlpine, for his contributions to cinematography in feature film. Ivan Sen received the Byron Kennedy Award, an award given to a person in their early career, for: "his unique artistic vision and for showing us, by his resourceful multidisciplinary filmmaking, that telling stories on screen is in reach of all who have something consequential to say." The Outstanding Achievement in Television Screen Craft award was given to production designer Herbert Pinter, for his work on the television series Cloudstreet (2011).

== Winners and nominees ==
=== Feature film ===
Winners are listed first and highlighted in boldface.

Best Film	Best Direction
**Red Dog** – **Nelson Woss** and **Julie Ryan**; The Eye of the Storm – Antony Waddington, Gregory J. Read and Fred Schepisi; The Hunter – Vincent Sheehan; Mad Bastards – David Jowsey, Alan Pigram, Stephen Pigram, and Brendan Fletcher; Oranges and Sunshine – Camilla Bray, Emile Sherman and Iain Canning; Snowtown – Anna McLeish and Sarah Shaw	**Justin Kurzel – Snowtown**; Fred Schepisi – The Eye of the Storm; Daniel Nettheim – The Hunter; Kriv Stenders – Red Dog
Best Original Screenplay	Best Adapted Screenplay
**Griff the Invisible – Leon Ford**; The Loved Ones – Sean Byrne; Mad Bastards – Brendan Fletcher; Red Hill – Patrick Hughes	**Snowtown – Shaun Grant**; The Eye of the Storm – Judy Morris; The Hunter – Alice Addison; Red Dog – Daniel Taplitz
Best Lead Actor	Best Lead Actress
**Daniel Henshall** – **Snowtown** as **John Bunting**; Willem Dafoe – The Hunter as Matt King; Geoffrey Rush – The Eye of the Storm as Basil Hunter; David Wenham – Oranges and Sunshine as Len	**Judy Davis** – **The Eye of the Storm** as **Dorothy de Lascabanes**; Frances O'Connor – The Hunter as Lucy Armstrong; Charlotte Rampling – The Eye of the Storm as Elizabeth Hunter; Emily Watson – Oranges and Sunshine as Margaret Humphreys
Best Supporting Actor	Best Supporting Actress
**Hugo Weaving** – **Oranges and Sunshine** as **Jack**; John Gaden – The Eye of the Storm as Arnold Wyburd; Sam Neill – The Hunter as Jack Mindy; Robert Rabiah – Face to Face as Hakim Slimon	**Louise Harris** – **Snowtown** as **Elizabeth Harvey**; Morgana Davies – The Hunter as Sass Armstrong; Helen Morse – The Eye of the Storm as Lotte; Alexandra Schepisi – The Eye of the Storm as Flora
Best Cinematography^{[A]}	Best Editing^{[A]}
**The Hunter – Robert Humphreys**; Red Dog – Geoffrey Hall; Sleeping Beauty – Geoffrey Simpson; Snowtown – Adam Arkapaw	**Snowtown – Veronika Jenet**; Oranges and Sunshine – Dany Cooper; Red Dog – Jill Bilcock; Wasted on the Young – Leanne Cole
Best Original Music Score^{[A]}	Best Sound^{[A]}
**The Hunter** – **Matteo Zingales**, **Michael Lira** and **Andrew Lancaster**; Legend of the Guardians: The Owls of Ga'Hoole – David Hirschfelder; Red Dog – Cezary Skubiszewski; Snowtown – Jed Kurzel	**Snowtown** – **Frank Lipson**, **Andrew McGrath**, **Des Kenneally**, **Michael Carden**, **John Simpson** and **Erin McKimm**; The Hunter – Sam Petty, David Lee, Robert Mackenzie, Les Fiddess, Tony Murtagh and Tom Heuzenroeder; Legend of the Guardians: The Owls of Ga'Hoole – Wayne Pashley, Derryn Pasquill, Polly McKinnon, Fabian Sanjurjo, Phil Heywood and Peter Smith; Mad Bastards – Phil Judd, Nick Emond and Johanna Emond
Best Production Design^{[A]}	Best Costume Design^{[A]}
**The Eye of the Storm – Melinda Doring**; The Hunter – Steven Jones-Evans; Red Dog – Ian Gracie; Sleeping Beauty – Annie Beauchamp	**The Eye of the Storm – Terry Ryan**; The Hunter – Emily Seresin; Oranges and Sunshine – Cappi Ireland; Sleeping Beauty – Shareen Beringer
AFI Members' Choice Award^{[A]}
**Red Dog** – **Nelson Woss** and **Julie Ryan**; The Hunter – Vincent Sheehan; Mad Bastards – David Jowsey, Alan Pigram, Stephen Pigram, and Brendan Fletcher; Oranges and Sunshine – Camilla Bray, Emile Sherman, and Iain Canning; The Eye of the Storm – Antony Waddington, Gregory J. Read and Fred Schepisi; Snowtown – Anna McLeish and Sarah Shaw

=== Television ===
Best Drama Series	Best Comedy Series^{[A]}
**East West 101 (Season 3) – Steve Knapman and Kris Wyld (SBS)**; Offspring (Season 2) – John Edwards and Imogen Banks (Network Ten); Rake – Ian Collie, Peter Duncan and Richard Roxburgh (ABC1); Spirited (Season 2) – Claudia Karvan and Jacquelin Perske (W)	**Laid – Liz Watts** (ABC1); At Home With Julia – Rick Kalowski, Greg Quail and Carol Hughes (ABC1); Twentysomething – Nicole Minchin (ABC2)
Best Telefeature, Mini Series or Short Run Series	Best Light Entertainment Series
**The Slap – Tony Ayres, Helen Bowden, Michael McMahon (ABC1)**; Cloudstreet – Greg Haddrick and Brenda Pam (Showcase); Paper Giants: The Birth of Cleo – John Edwards and Karen Radzyner (ABC1); Sisters of War – Andrew Wiseman (ABC1)	**The Gruen Transfer (Series 4) – Andrew Denton, Anita Jacoby and Jon Casimir (ABC1)**; Hungry Beast (Season 3) – Andrew Denton, Anita Jacoby, Andy Nehl and Jon Casimir (ABC1); Judith Lucy's Spiritual Journey – Todd Abbott (ABC1); Junior MasterChef (Season 1) – Tara McWilliams (Network Ten); RocKwiz – Brian Nankervis, Ken Connor, Peter Bain-Hogg and Joe Connor (SBS)
Best Children's Television Series^{[A]}	Best Comedy Performance^{[A]}
**My Place** **(Series 2)** – **Penny Chapman** (ABC3); A gURLs wURLd – Noel Price (Nine Network); Gasp! – Suzanne Ryan (Nine Network); H_{2}O: Just Add Water (Season 3) – Jonathan M. Shiff (Network Ten)	**Chris Lilley – Angry Boys as Daniel and Nathan Sims, S.mouse, Jen Okazaki,** **Gran and Blake Oakfield (ABC1)**; Alison Bell – Laid as Roo McVie (ABC1); Jess Harris – Twentysomething as Jess (ABC2); Celia Pacquola – Laid as EJ (ABC1)
Best Lead Actor – Drama	Best Lead Actress – Drama
**Alex Dimitriades – The Slap as Harry (ABC1)**; Rob Carlton – Paper Giants: The Birth of Cleo as Kerry Packer (ABC1); Don Hany – East West 101 as Detective Zane Malik (SBS); Jonathan LaPaglia – The Slap as Hector (ABC1)	**Sarah Snook – Sisters of War as Lorna Whyte (ABC1)**; Essie Davis – Cloudstreet as Dolly Pickles (Showcase); Kerry Fox – Cloudstreet as Oriel Lamb (Showcase); Asher Keddie – Paper Giants: The Birth of Cleo as Ita Buttrose (ABC1)
Best Guest or Supporting Actor – Drama	Best Guest or Supporting Actress – Drama
**Richard Cawthorne – Killing Time as Dennis Allen (TV1)**; Aaron Fa'aoso – East West 101 as Detective Sonny Koa (SBS); Jacek Koman – Spirited as Potter The Man (W); Todd Lasance – Cloudstreet as Quick Lamb (Showcase)	**Diana Glenn – The Slap as Sandi (ABC1)**; Rena Owen – East West 101 as Mere Hahunga (SBS); Susie Porter – Sisters of War as Kay Parker (ABC1); Lara Robinson – Cloudstreet as Young Rose Pickles (Showcase)
Best Direction	Best Screenplay
**Matthew Saville – The Slap for Episode 3: "Harry" (ABC1)**; Daina Reid – Paper Giants: The Birth of Cleo for "Episode 1" (ABC1); Jessica Hobbs – The Slap for Episode 1: "Hector" (ABC1); Jeffrey Walker – Small Time Gangster for Episode 1: "Jingle Bells" (Movie Extra)	**The Slap – Brendan Cowell for Episode 3: "Harry" (ABC1)**; Cloudstreet – Tim Winton and Ellen Fontana for "Part 3" (Showcase); Laid – Kirsty Fisher for "Episode 3" (ABC1); The Slap – Kris Mrksa for Episode 1: "Hector" (ABC1)

=== Non-feature film ===
Best Feature Length Documentary^{[A]}	Best Documentary Under One Hour^{[A]}
**Mrs Carey's Concert** – **Bob Connolly**, **Helen Panckhurst** and **Sophie Raymond**; Life in Movement – Sophie Hyde and Bryan Mason; Shut Up Little Man! An Audio Misadventure – Sophie Hyde and Matthew Bate; The Tall Man – Darren Dale	**Jandamarra's War** – **Andrew Ogilvie**, **Andrea Quesnelle** and **Eileen Torres**; The Ball – Yael Bergman, Laura Waters and Jessica Leski; Leaky Boat – Penny Chapman; Orchids: My Intersex Adventure – Phoebe Hart
Best Short Fiction Film^{[A]}	Best Short Animation^{[A]}
Adam's Tallit – Justin Olstein and Marie Maroun; Cropped – Bettina Hamilton and Dave Wade; The Palace – Kate Croser, Anthony Maras and Andros Achilleos; The Telegram Man – James F. Khehtie and Victoria Wharfe McIntyre	Forget Me Not – Emily Dean; The Missing Key – Garth Nix, Anna McFarlane and Jonathan Nix; The Moment – Justin Wight, Kristian Molière, Troy Bellchambers and Shane McNeil; Nullarbor – Alister Lockhart, Patrick Sarell, Katrina Mathers, Merrin Jensen and Daryl Munton
Best Documentary Series^{[A]}	Best Screenplay in a Short Film^{[A]}
**SAS – The Search for Warriors** – **Julia Redwood** and **Ed Punchard** (SBS); Immigration Nation, The Secret History Of Us – Jacob Hickey, Alex West and Lucy Maclaren (SBS); Outback Fight Club – Paul Scott and Isabel Perez (SBS); Outback Kids – Mike Bluett, Mark Hamlyn and Marc Radomsky (ABC1)	**The Palace – Anthony Maras**; Afterglow – Nadine Garner; Cropped – Dave Wade; Waiting for the Turning of the Earth – David Evan Giles
Best Direction in a Documentary^{[A]}	Best Cinematography in a Documentary^{[A]}
**Bob Connolly** and **Sophie Raymond** – **Mrs Carey's Concert**; Bryan Mason and Sophie Hyde – Life in Movement; Matthew Bate – Shut Up Little Man! An Audio Misadventure; Tony Krawitz – The Tall Man	**Out of the Ashes – David Parer**; Jandamarra's War – Allan Collins, Jim Frater and Rusty Geller; Mrs Carey's Concert – Bob Connolly; The Tall Man – Germain McMicking
Best Sound in a Documentary^{[A]}	Best Editing in a Documentary^{[A]}
**murundak – songs of freedom** – **Emma Bortignon**, **Michael Letho**, **Peter Smith**, **Christopher O'Young** and **Simon Walbrook**; Jandamarra's War – Laurie Chlanda, Glenn Martin, Ric Curtin, Ash Gibson Greig and Petris Torres; Mrs Carey's Concert – Sophie Raymond, Bob Scott and Doron Kipen; Shut Up Little Man! An Audio Misadventure – Jonny Elk Walsh, Pete Best, Tom Heuzenroeder, Emma Bortignon and Scott Illingworth	**Shut Up Little Man! An Audio Misadventure – Bryan Mason**; Leaky Boat – Lawrie Silvestrin; Mrs Carey's Concert – Sophie Raymond, Ray Thomas and Nick Meyers; The Tall Man – Rochelle Oshlack

=== Additional awards ===
Best Television Program^{[B]}	Best Performance^{[B]}
**Packed to the Rafters** (Seven Network); MasterChef Australia (Network Ten); Paper Giants: The Birth of Cleo (ABC1); Underbelly: Razor (Nine Network)	**Asher Keddie – Paper Giants: The Birth of Cleo as Ita Buttrose (ABC1)**; Jeremy Lindsay Taylor – Underbelly: Razor as Norman Bruhn (Nine Network); Erik Thomson – Packed to the Rafters as David Rafter (Seven Network); Rebecca Gibney – Packed to the Rafters as Julie Rafter (Seven Network)
Best Young Actor	Best Visual Effects^{[A]}
**Lara Robinson** – **Cloudstreet**: (part one), as **Young Rose Pickles**; Olivia DeJonge – Good Pretender as Ally; Emma Jefferson – My Place: series two, as Johanna; Lucas Yeeda – Mad Bastards as Bullet	**Legend of the Guardians: The Owls of Ga'Hoole – Grant Freckelton**; Cloudstreet – Scott Zero (Showcase); The Hunter – Felix Crawshaw and James Rogers; Sanctum – David Booth, Peter Webb, Ineke Majoor and Glenn Melenhorst

=== Films with multiple nominations ===
- Fourteen: The Hunter
- Twelve: The Eye of the Storm
- Ten: Snowtown
- Eight: Red Dog
- Seven: Oranges and Sunshine
- Five: Mad Bastards
- Three: Legend of the Guardians: The Owls of Ga'Hoole and Sleeping Beauty, The Tall Man

== Presenters and performers ==
=== Presenters ===
Presenters are listed alphabetically:

- Cate Blanchett
- Shane Bourne
- Rob Carlton
- Blake Davis
- Alex Dimitriades
- Gigi Edgley
- Adam Elliot
- Asher Keddie
- Miranda Kerr
- Anthony LaPaglia
- Jonathan LaPaglia
- Todd Lasance
- Lincoln Lewis
- Richard Roxburgh
- Geoffrey Rush
- Xavier Samuel
- Rachael Taylor
- Mia Wasikowska
- Jacki Weaver
- Samara Weaving
- Richard Wilkins

=== Performers ===
- Stephen Curry
- Olivia Newton-John
- Tim Rogers
- Megan Washington

== Gallery ==
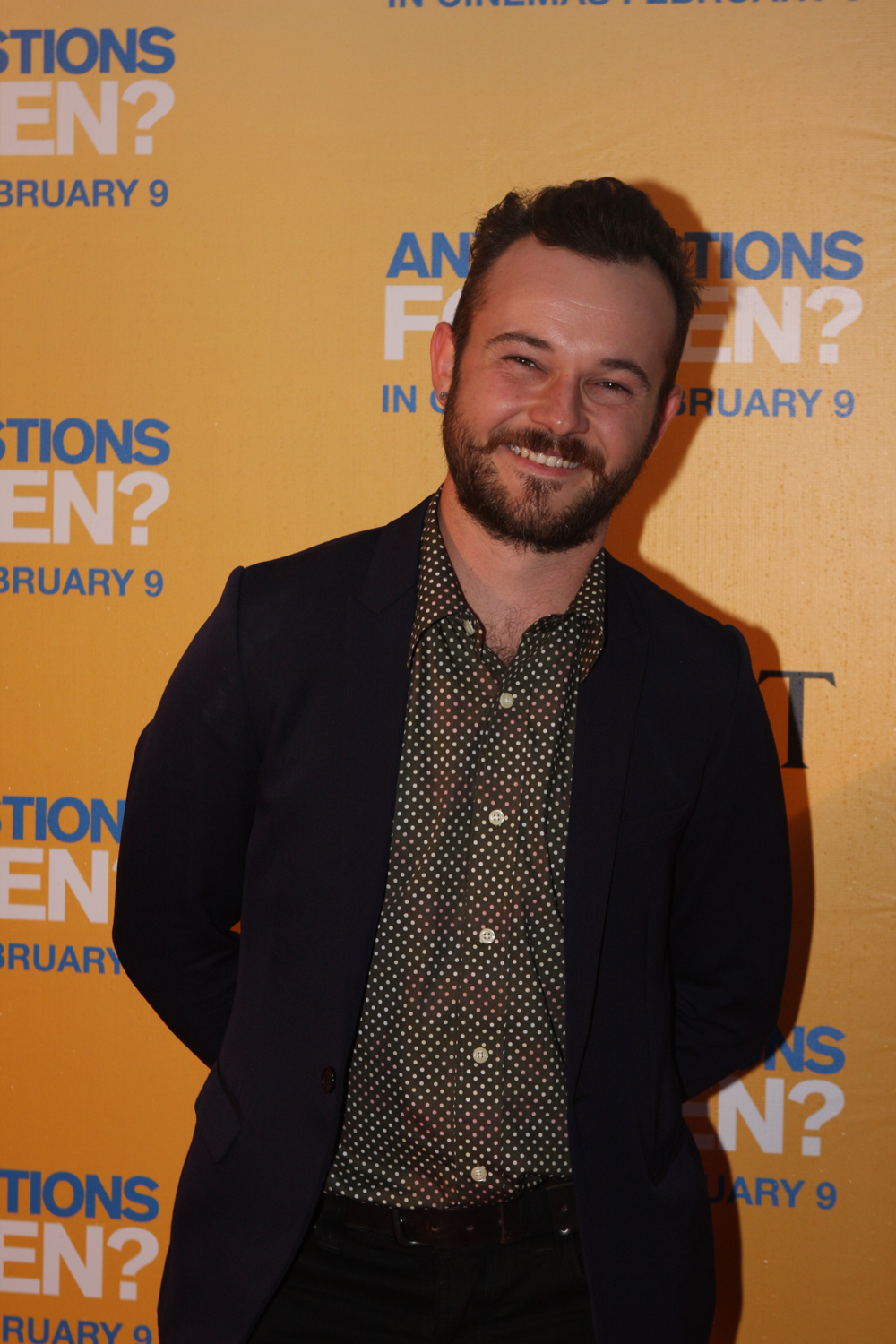
Daniel Henshall, Best Lead Actor winner

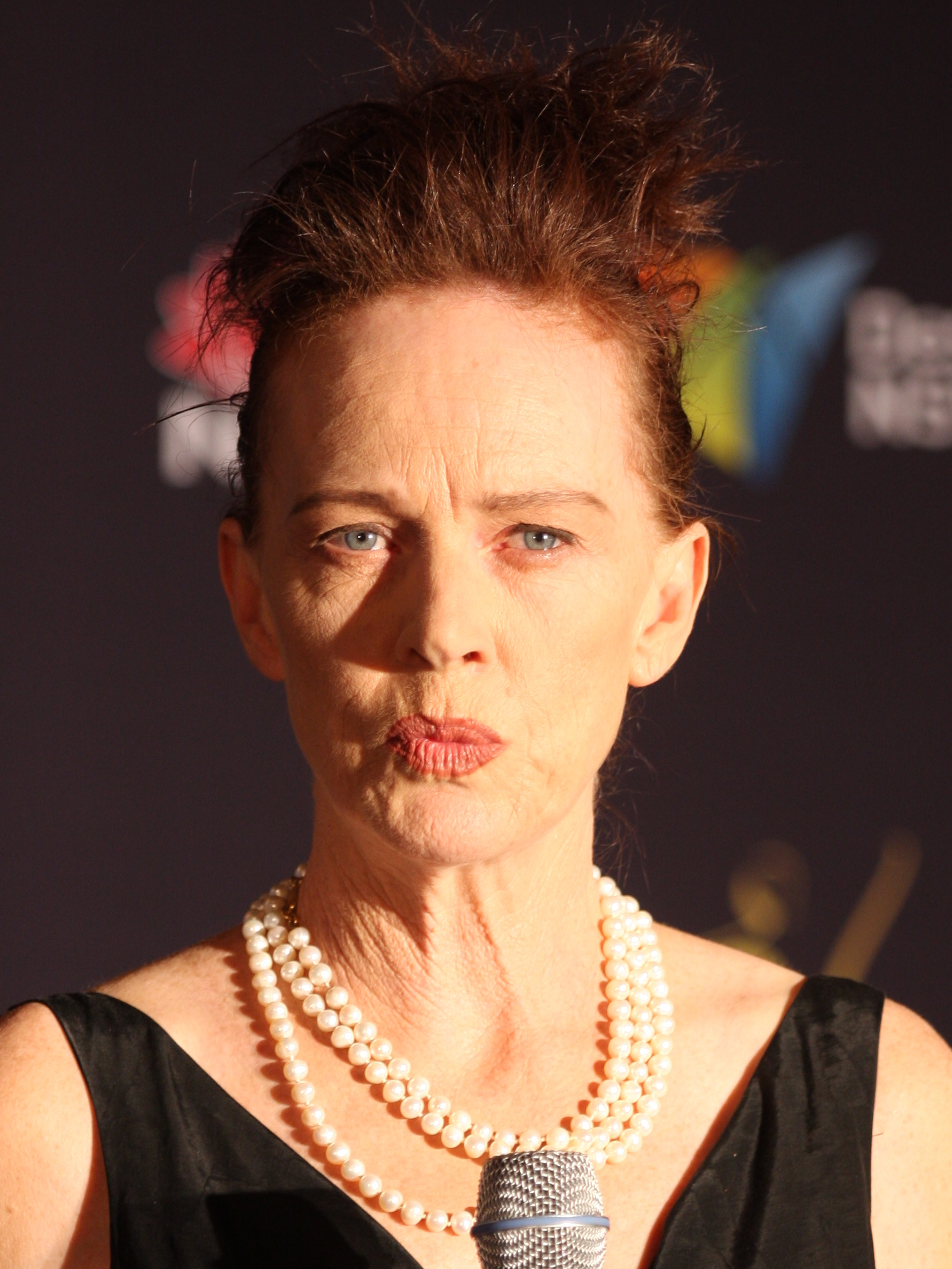
Judy Davis, Best Lead Actress winner

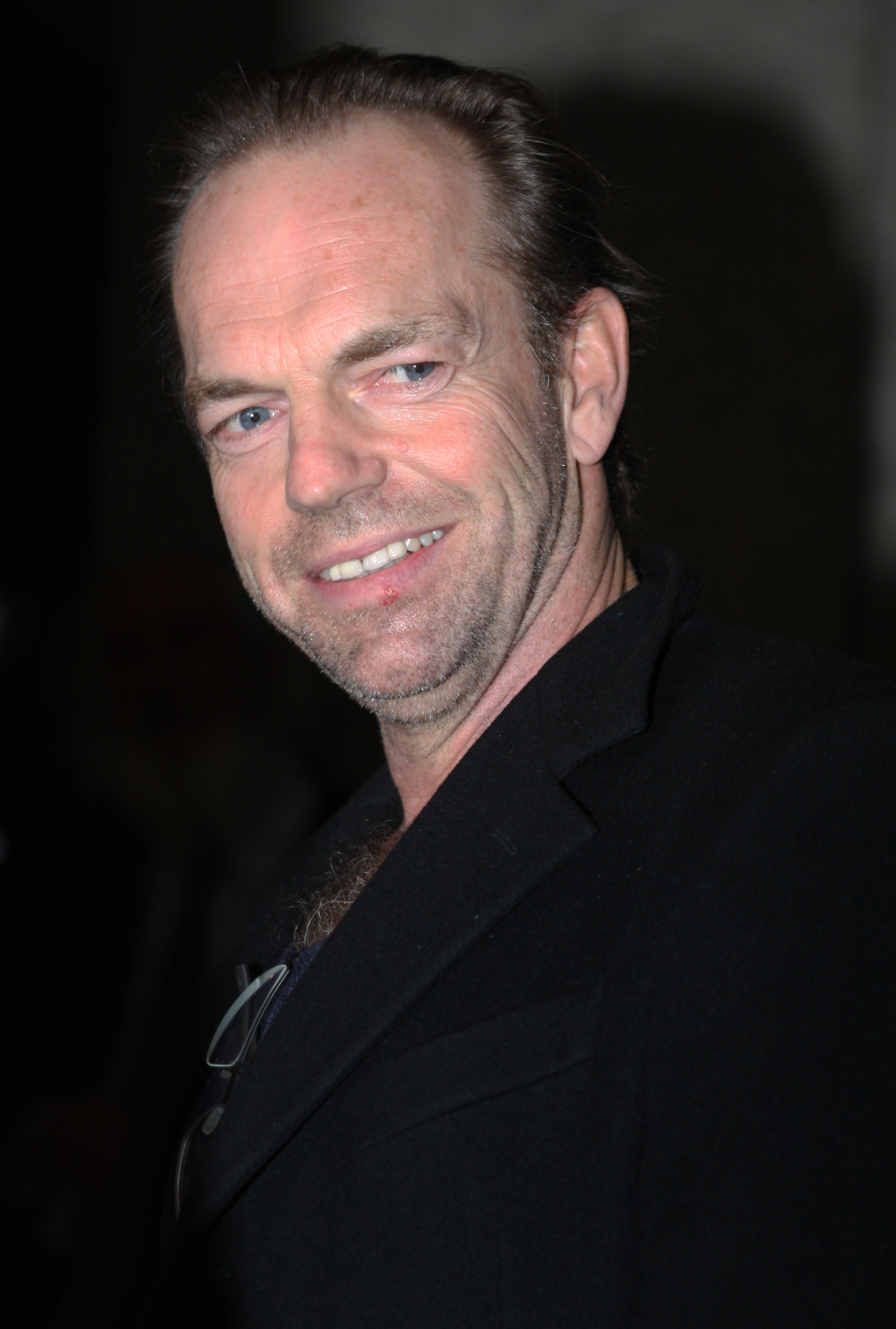
Hugo Weaving, Best Supporting Actor winner

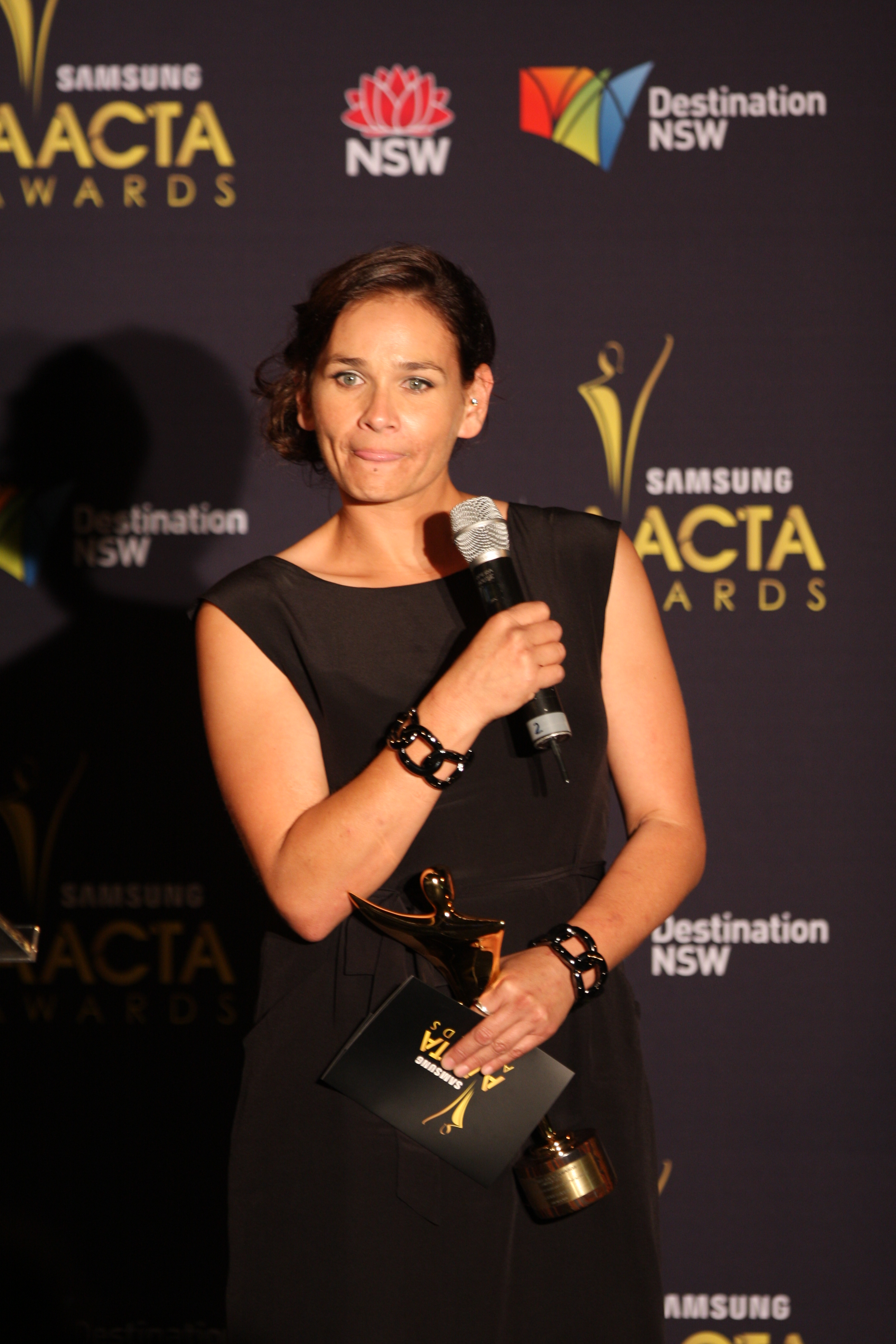
Louise Harris, Best Supporting Actress winner

== See also ==
- 1st AACTA International Awards
- AACTA Awards
- Australian films of 2011
- 2011 in film

== Notes ==
A^{1} ^{2} ^{3} ^{4} ^{5} ^{6} ^{7} ^{8} ^{9} ^{10} ^{11} ^{12} ^{13} ^{14} ^{15} ^{16} ^{17} ^{18} ^{19} : The following categories were presented at the AACTA Awards Luncheon, on 15 January 2012, before the main ceremony: Longford Lyell Award, Best Cinematography, Best Editing, Best Sound, Best Original Music Score, Best Production Design, Best Costume Design, Best Visual Effects, AFI Members' Choice Award, Best Feature Length Documentary, Best Documentary Under One Hour, Best Direction – Documentary, Best Cinematography – Documentary, Best Editing – Documentary, Best Sound – Documentary, Best Short Fiction Film, Best Short Animation, Best Screenplay – Short Film

B^{1} ^{2} : The awards for Best Television Program and Best Performance are television awards, voted for by the public.
