= List of 2011 box office number-one films in Australia =

This is a list of films that placed number one at the box office in Australia during 2011. All amounts are in Australian dollars.

== Number-one films ==
†	This implies the highest-grossing movie of the year.

#	Week ending	Film	Total week gross	Openings
1	5 January 2011	Meet the Parents: Little Fockers	$6,193,213	n/a
2	12 January 2011	Tangled	$9,646,889	Unstoppable (#5), Morning Glory (#6), No One Killed Jessica (#19).
3	19 January 2011	Yogi Bear	$6,458,324	Burlesque (#3), The Dilemma (#5), Yamla Pagla Deewana (#15).
4	26 January 2011	The Green Hornet	$4,582,013	Black Swan (#3), The Fighter (#6), True Grit (#13), How Do You Know (#16).
5	2 February 2011	Black Swan	$3,083,171	Another Year (#13), Catfish (#20).
6	9 February 2011	Black Swan	$2,526,130	James Cameron Presents Sanctum (#3), The Next Three Days (#6), Faster (#8), Tamara Drewe (#14).
7	16 February 2011	No Strings Attached	$3,544,819	127 Hours (#4), Hereafter (#5).
8	23 February 2011	Unknown	$2,316,360	Gnomeo and Juliet (#2), Big Mommas: Like Father, Like Son (#5), Rabbit Hole (#11), Certified Copy (#20).
9	2 March 2011	I Am Number Four	$3,725,572	Conviction (#6), The Way Back (#10).
10	9 March 2011	Hall Pass	$2,631,835	The Adjustment Bureau (#2), The Girl Who Kicked the Hornets' Nest (#7), Wasted on the Young (#18).
11	16 March 2011	Rango	$3,554,212	The Rite (#7), The Company Men (#15).
12	23 March 2011	Battle: Los Angeles	$3,218,424	Limitless (#3), The Reef (#19).
13	30 March 2011	Red Riding Hood	$2,260,606	The Mechanic (#5), Barney's Version (#9), Biutiful (#16).
14	6 April 2011	Just Go with It	$3,128,767	The Lincoln Lawyer (#2), Never Let Me Go (#9), In a Better World (#17).
15	13 April 2011	Rio	$4,492,835	Hop (#2), Sucker Punch (#4), Justin Bieber: Never Say Never (#5), My Afternoons with Margueritte (#15).
16	20 April 2011	Rio	$3,056,885	Paul (#2), Scream 4 (#4), Diary of a Wimpy Kid 2: Rodrick Rules (#5), Brighton Rock (#13), Mars Needs Moms (#18).
17	27 April 2011	Fast Five	$12,236,706	Thor (#2), Arthur (#5), Trophy Wife (#13), Incendies (#15), Dum Maaro Dum (#18).
18	4 May 2011	Fast Five	$5,350,068	The Lost Bladesman (#19).
19	11 May 2011	Fast Five	$2,415,386	Source Code (#3), Something Borrowed (#4), Hoodwinked Too! Hood vs. Evil (#7), Babies (#14), Mad Bastards (#15).
20	18 May 2011	Water for Elephants	$3,664,459	Insidious (#7), Your Highness (#8), Burke and Hare (#15).
21	25 May 2011	Pirates of the Caribbean: On Stranger Tides	$12,234,267	Snowtown (#8), Angele and Tony (#17).
22	1 June 2011	The Hangover Part II	$14,572,439	Get Low (#9), Soul Surfer (#11), Warren Miller's Wintervention (#13), Of Gods and Men (#17), Oceans (#20).
23	8 June 2011	The Hangover Part II	$7,207,722	X-Men: First Class (#2), Ready (#9).
24	15 June 2011	The Hangover Part II	$5,052,235	Super 8 (#3), Oranges and Sunshine (#6).
25	22 June 2011	Bridesmaids	$5,914,912	Little White Lies (#8).
26	29 June 2011	Cars 2	$6,381,483	Kung Fu Panda 2 (#2), Double Dhamaal (#10), Sleeping Beauty (#12).
27	6 July 2011	Transformers: Dark of the Moon	$17,544,232	Mr. Popper's Penguins (#5), The Tree of Life (#9), The Trip (#11), Delhi Belly (#12).
28	13 July 2011	Transformers: Dark of the Moon	$9,793,337	Mozart's Sister (#13), Murder 2 (#20).
29	20 July 2011	Harry Potter and the Deathly Hallows – Part 2 †	$23,569,120	Zindagi Na Milegi Dobara (#9).
30	27 July 2011	Harry Potter and the Deathly Hallows – Part 2 †	$9,886,507	Bad Teacher (#2), Larry Crowne (#5), Beautiful Lies (#10), Singham (#15), The Eagle (#18).
31	3 August 2011	Captain America: The First Avenger	$5,821,009	Hanna (#4), Big Mamma's Boy (#12), The Conspirator (#14), The Illusionist (#18).
32	10 August 2011	Rise of the Planet of the Apes	$6,123,884	Red Dog (#4), The Beaver (#13).
33	17 August 2011	Rise of the Planet of the Apes	$3,944,611	Green Lantern (#2), Glee: The 3D Concert Movie (#6), Jane Eyre (#7), Senna (#9), Aarakshan (#13).
34	24 August 2011	Friends with Benefits	$3,340,992	Cowboys & Aliens (#3), Conan the Barbarian (#7), Win Win (#13), Pina (#16).
35	31 August 2011	Horrible Bosses	$4,285,396	The Guard (#10), Priest (#11), Beginners (#12).
36	7 September 2011	Horrible Bosses	$2,899,479	The Help (#3), Final Destination 5 (#4), One Day (#7), Bodyguard (#12), Chalet Girl (#18).
37	14 September 2011	Zookeeper	$2,121,679	The Change-Up (#5), Mere Brother Ki Dulhan (#15), Submarine (#16), 13 Assassins (#20).
38	21 September 2011	The Smurfs	$3,599,122	Johnny English Reborn (#2), Fright Night (#8), The Eye of the Storm (#10).
39	28 September 2011	The Smurfs	$5,539,532	Abduction (#3), The Lion King 3D (#4), Spy Kids: All the Time in the World (#7), Monte Carlo (#9), Mausam (#18), Cave of Forgotten Dreams (#19).
40	5 October 2011	The Smurfs	$5,543,544	Crazy, Stupid, Love (#2), The Whistleblower (#16), Force (#18), Tornado Alley (#19).
41	12 October 2011	Real Steel	$5,363,502	Footloose (#5), The Hunter (#12).
42	19 October 2011	Real Steel	$2,904,668	The Cup (#3), What's Your Number? (#4), The Thing (#7), The Phantom of the Opera at Albert Hall (#10), Red State (#19).
43	26 October 2011	Paranormal Activity 3	$3,683,297	Contagion (#2), Midnight in Paris (#3), The Three Musketeers (#5), TT3D: Closer to the Edge (#10), George Harrison: Living in the Material World (#17).
44	2 November 2011	In Time	$3,246,676	Warrior (#5), Drive (#8), Ra.One (#11), Judy Moody and the Not Bummer Summer (#14)
45	9 November 2011	In Time	$2,069,114	I Don't Know How She Does It (#2), Anonymous (#7), Don't Be Afraid of the Dark (#13), Our Idiot Brother (#15), Bill Cunningham New York (#19).
46	16 November 2011	Moneyball	$1,832,813	Shark Night 3D (#6), The Debt (#8), Courageous (#14), Santa's Apprentice (#15), Rockstar (#16), Fighting Fear (#18).
47	23 November 2011	The Twilight Saga: Breaking Dawn – Part 1	$15,333,608	We Need to Talk About Kevin (#11), The Orator (#13), Burning Man (#19), The First Grader (#20).
48	30 November 2011	The Twilight Saga: Breaking Dawn – Part 1	$6,683,392	The Inbetweeners Movie (#2), Immortals (#3), Arthur Christmas (#4), The Ides of March (#5), Desi Boyz (#9), Ages of Love (#18).
49	7 December 2011	The Twilight Saga: Breaking Dawn – Part 1	$2,996,047	Jack and Jill (#2), Attack the Block (#12), The Dirty Picture (#14).
50	14 December 2011	Puss in Boots	$4,468,628	New Year's Eve (#2), Ladies vs Ricky Bahl (#16).
51	21 December 2011	Mission: Impossible – Ghost Protocol	$6,141,793	Dolphin Tale (#8), The Women on the 6th Floor (#11), Melancholia (#13), Flying Swords of Dragon Gate (#16).
52	28 December 2011	Mission: Impossible – Ghost Protocol	$4,016,119	The Adventures of Tintin: The Secret of the Unicorn (#2), Happy Feet Two (#3), Tower Heist (#5), War Horse (#6), The Iron Lady (#8), We Bought a Zoo (#9), Don 2 (#10), The Skin I Live In (#20).

== See also ==
- List of Australian films – Australian films by year
