= Louise Harris (disambiguation) =

Louise Harris may refer to:

- Louise Harris, Australian actress
- Louise "Mamma" Harris, American labor organizer
- Louise Harris (politician), British councilwoman
- Louise Harris (singer), British singer and climate activist
- Louise Harris, a character in the 2026 animated sports film Goat, voiced by Jennifer Hudson
