= Counter-development =

Counter-development is a strategy and world-view advocated by Helena Norberg-Hodge and the Indian organization Ladakh Ecological Development Group (LEDeG). In her book Ancient Futures, Helena Norberg-Hodge entails "traditional" ways of life employed by the people of Ladakh. A broad base of people need to adopt counter-development, to check and reverse the tide of environmental destruction, social fragmentation, and to the concentration of power and wealth in the hands of transnational corporations.

The manifestation of counter-development in the first world would "...heal ourselves and the planet, we need to regain control of these levers [Regulation, Taxes and Subsidies, and Measures of Societal Well-being] through economic activism, underpinned by an understanding of the workings of globalization. If the multitude of social and environmental movements link hands to address a common agenda, sufficient pressure can be exerted to bring about meaningful policy change."

Counter-development seeks return to rural communities which would be semi-autarkic, ecologically sound and autonomous. Norberg-Hodge urges this restructuring as an answer to fundamental flaws and repercussion of the global economic system.
