= Disquiet (Leigh novel) =

- Author: Julia Leigh
- Language: English
- Publication date: 2008

Disquiet is a 2008 novel by Julia Leigh.

== Plot ==
Leigh wrote this novel about a mother of two young children who leaves her husband and goes to live with her mother in rural France.

== Awards ==
Disquiet was shortlisted for many major literary awards and won the 2009 Encore Award (UK) for best second novel and the 2009 Prix Indications Passa Porta (Belgium) for best foreign literature. It was a France Culture/ Télérama Rentrée Selection (France), a Los Angeles Times Favourite Book, a Kirkus Best Book of the Year, and No.7 on Entertainment Weekly's Top Ten Books of the Year (US). The 2008 Shirley Jackson Award (US) for best novella went to Disquiet.

== Film ==
Screen Australia began funding the film adaption of the novel in May 2012. The novel's author, Julia Leigh, wrote the screenplay and worked as film director on the project.
