= The Economics of Happiness =

- Official film poster
- Directed by: Steven Gorelick; Helena Norberg-Hodge; John Page
- Produced by: Helena Norberg-Hodge
- Narrated by: John Page
- Edited by: Anna Fricke; Army Armstrong; Meredith Holch
- Music by: Florian Fricke
- Release date: 11 January 2011
- Running time: 68 minutes
- Country: Australia
- Language: English

The Economics of Happiness is a 2011 documentary film directed by Helena Norberg-Hodge, Steven Gorelick, and John Page, and produced by Local Futures (formerly the International Society for Ecology and Culture).

== Synopsis ==
The film features many voices from six continents calling for systemic economic change. The documentary describes a world moving simultaneously in two opposing directions. While government and big business continue to promote globalization and the consolidation of corporate power, people around the world are resisting those policies and working to forge a very different future. Communities are coming together to re-build more human scale, ecological economies based on a new paradigm: an economics of localization.

== Recognition ==
The Economics of Happiness has won "Best in Show" at the Cinema Verde Film and Arts Festival, "Best Direction" from EKOFilm 2011 (Czech Republic), "Judges' Choice" and "Audience Choice" at the Auroville International Film Festival (India), an "Award of Merit" from the Accolade Film Festival, and several other awards.

In 2012, the film was listed among the top ten films as chosen by Transition town initiatives.

In 2015, it was awarded 1st place out of 100 "documentaries we can use to change the world" by Films for Action, an activism-oriented film screening and compilation site.
