= Local Futures =

Local Futures (formerly the International Society for Ecology and Culture) is a non-profit organization whose purpose is to raise awareness about what it identifies as the root causes of contemporary social, environmental, and economic crises.

The group argues that focusing on single issues – saving whales, blocking nuclear power plants, feeding the hungry, etc. – only overwhelms people and ultimately fails as a strategy. Instead, Local Futures believes that the focus must be on changing the fundamental forces that create or exacerbate all of these problems. Among those forces are economic globalization, corporate power, and conventional notions of technological and economic "progress". As a solution, Local Futures promotes economic localization and other locally based alternatives to the global consumer culture, as a means to protect both biological and cultural diversity. The group is also associated with the concept of Counter-development.

Local Futures is the parent organization of a program in Ladakh, or "Little Tibet", begun in 1975. The Ladakh Project includes a wide range of hands-on activities, including a renewable-energy program, and has won international recognition for countering the negative effects of conventional development in that region. Local Futures' founder and Director, Helena Norberg-Hodge, shared the 1986 Right Livelihood Award. In 2012, she received the Goi Peace Award for "her pioneering work in the localization movement".

== Films ==
Local Futures has produced an extensive catalog of documentary films and short animations that cover the impacts of globalization on local economies around the world, including: Ancient Futures: Learning from Ladakh (1993), The Economics of Happiness (2011), Planet Local: A Quiet Revolution (2022), Local Food can Save the World (2022), Closer to Home: Voices of Hope in a Time of Crisis (2024), The Power of Local (2024), Trade Gone Mad (2024).

== Books, Reports and Blog ==
Local Futures continues to publish a considerable collection of books and reports, blog articles and other resources for localization activists.

An early advocate for local food (and one of the few organizations to look at local food from a global perspective), Local Futures also produced the book Bringing the Food Economy Home: Local Alternatives to Global Agribusiness (Kumarian Press, 2002), as well as Local Is Our Future (2019), Life After Progress (2022). Local Futures' best known text is Ancient Futures by Helena Norberg-Hodge published in 1991 and 2016. Another important resource for communities looking for solutions is the Localization Action Guide, which is updated regularly.

== Events ==
=== World Localization Day ===
In 2020, the organization launched an online campaign World Localization Day (WLD) to strengthen and raise awareness about the emerging worldwide localization movement. WLD continues to be celebrated each year throughout the month of June, with the main celebration occurring on 21 June. Local Futures invites communities from around the world to join in celebrating WLD by showcasing their localization efforts through hosting events such as local feasts, film screenings of Local Futures' and other localization focused films and panel discussions.

=== Planet Local Summits: Bristol and Ladakh ===
In 2023 Local Futures hosted its first Planet Local Summit in Bristol, UK. This event brought localization activists from around the world together to network and discuss solutions for resisting globalization and fostering local connections.

A follow up Planet Local Summit will be held in Ladakh, India in September 2025 to strengthen the localization movement and to mark the 50th anniversary of Helena Norberg-Hodge's first arrival in Ladakh.

=== Economics of Happiness Conferences ===
Local Futures has also organized a series of Economics of Happiness conferences, including in Berkeley, California (2012), Byron Bay, Australia (2013 & 2019), Bangalore, India (2014 & 2019), Portland, Oregon (2015), Florence, Italy (2016 & 2018), Bristol, UK (2018), Ladakh, India (2019) and Tokyo, Japan (2017, 2018 & 2019), as well as a series of events in Jeonju, South Korea.

== Other works ==
Local Futures has established a network, The International Alliance to Localization (IAL) to bring together groups and individuals from different parts of the world that are struggling to maintain their cultural integrity in the face of economic globalization. Another measure of the international reach of this small organization is that Local Futures' many publications and videos have been translated into over 40 different languages.

Local Futures' directors also form the editorial board of The Ecologist magazine.

== See also ==
- Helena Norberg-Hodge (Local Futures' founder and Director)
