= AFI Members' Choice Award =

Former Australian film award

AFI Members' Choice Award AACTA Award
- Country: Australia
- Presented by: Australian Academy of Cinema and Television Arts (AACTA)
- First award: 2009
- Currently held by: Red Dog (2011)
- Website: http://www.aacta.org

The AFI Members' Choice Award, was a film award, presented to an Australian feature-length film that was voted for by members of the Australian Film Institute (AFI) from 2009. The last award was presented by the newly formed Australian Academy of Cinema and Television Arts (AACTA) in the inaugural AACTA Awards in 2011.

== History ==
Prior to the establishment of AACTA in 2011, the award was presented by AFI at the annual Australian Film Institute Awards (more commonly known as the AFI Awards) from 2009–2010. The award is presented at the AACTA Awards Luncheon, a black tie event which celebrates achievements in film production, television, documentaries and short films.

The name was still used at the inaugural AACTA Awards in 2011, but was dropped in the 2nd edition of the new awards.

== Winners and nominees ==
In the following table, winners are listed first, in boldface and highlighted in gold; those listed below the winner that are not in boldface or highlighted are the nominees.

Winner

Year	Film	Producer(s)
**2009** (51st)	**Samson and Delilah**	**Kath Shelper**
2009 (51st)	Australia	Baz Luhrmann, G. Mac Brown and Catherine Knapman
2009 (51st)	Balibo	John Maynard and Rebecca Williamson
2009 (51st)	Beautiful Kate	Leah Churchill-Brown, Bryan Brown
2009 (51st)	Mao's Last Dancer	Jane Scott
2009 (51st)	Mary and Max	Melanie Coombs
**2010** (52nd)	**Animal Kingdom**	**Liz Watts**
2010 (52nd)	Beneath Hill 60	Bill Leimbach
2010 (52nd)	Bran Nue Dae	Robyn Kershaw and Graeme Isaac
2010 (52nd)	Bright Star	Jan Chapman and Caroline Hewitt
2010 (52nd)	The Boys Are Back	Greg Brenman and Timothy White
2010 (52nd)	Tomorrow, When the War Began	Andrew Mason and Michael Boughen
**2011** (53rd)	**Red Dog**	**Nelson Woss** and **Julie Ryan**
2011 (53rd)	The Eye of the Storm	Antony Waddington, Gregory Read and Fred Schepisi
2011 (53rd)	The Hunter	Vincent Sheehan
2011 (53rd)	Mad Bastards	David Jowsey, Alan Pigram, Stephen Pigram, and Brendan Fletcher
2011 (53rd)	Oranges and Sunshine	Camilla Bray, Emile Sherman and Iain Canning
2011 (53rd)	Snowtown	Anna McLeish and Sarah Shaw

== See also ==
- AACTA Awards
