= The Hunter (Leigh novel) =

1999 novel by Julia Leigh

- First edition cover
- Author: Julia Leigh
- Language: English
- Genre: Suspense
- Publisher: Penguin Australia; Faber & Faber
- Publication date: 1999
- Publication place: Australia
- Media type: Print (paperback)
- Pages: 170 (first edition, paperback)
- ISBN: 9780140283518

The Hunter is the first novel by Australian writer and film director Julia Leigh, published in 1999. It follows the efforts of an anonymous agent as he attempts to track down the last Tasmanian tiger rumoured to exist in Tasmania.

Reception to the novel was primarily positive, and it went on to receive several accolades. Many reviewers positively highlighted Leigh as a writer of promise. The book has been translated into nine languages, and was adapted into a 2011 film of the same title directed by Daniel Nettheim.

== Plot summary ==
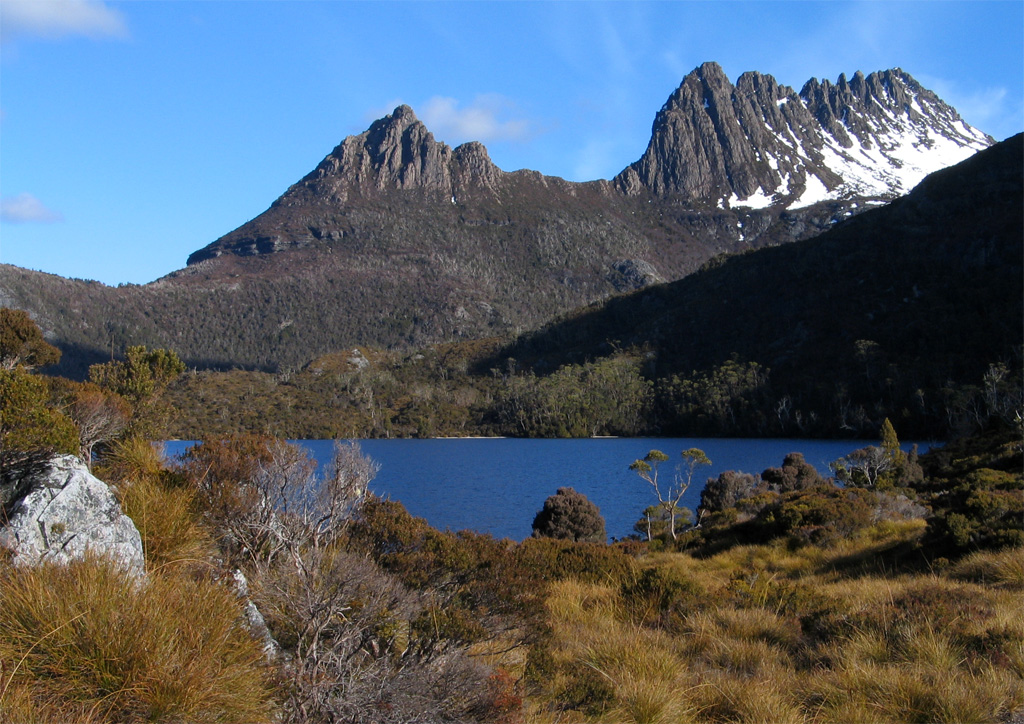
Cradle Mountain, part of the Tasmanian Wilderness

The book opens with the arrival in Tasmania of a man with the assumed identity of "Martin David, Naturalist" (referred to as M in the narrative). He is met at the home of Lucy Armstrong, where he is staying, by her children, Sass and Bike. The following morning, he meets Jack Mindy and is escorted up the escarpment towards the plateau. He learns that Jarrah Armstrong, the husband of Lucy and father to her children, has been missing in the area since last summer.

M meets Lucy for the first time at the home. Against his own conviction that her father is dead, he promises to Sass that he will try to find him. Over the next few weeks he makes two excursions into the wilderness, for the last confirmed sighting of the thylacine (Tasmanian tiger), but returns from each without success. Arriving back he finds Lucy "drug addled and confused" and that Sass has rummaged through his belongings after suspecting him of lying about her father. M again ventures several times to the plateau, and each time he returns to the house he observes Lucy's condition gradually improving. During one he discovers presumed remains of Jarrah Armstrong; in another, he encounters the print of the thylacine and fails to shoot what he suspects is the creature. On his return, he receives a message calling him away from Tasmania; as he leaves the family he admits to himself that he will miss them.

After a prolonged absence, M arrives back in Tasmania to find the Armstrong house empty. Mindy's wife relates that during his absence Sass was admitted to a children's hospital in Sydney, having been involved in a house fire that left her severely burned. Lucy, suffering from a mental breakdown, was placed into a mental hospital and Bike was put into foster care. M returns to the escarpment, now patrolled by National Park people, and spends the following weeks subsisting in the forest. He comes across a camp set up by two adolescents —"Small" and "Tall"—and stalks them until he comes across the suspected "lair" of the thylacine. After a time he emerges from the lair and shoots the animal, killing it. He dissects it and then burns the body. On his return journey down the escarpment he encounters Tall and Small, who are unaware of his real purpose or actions.

== Genre and style ==
The Hunter has been described as "a ghost story, a work of Tasmanian gothic for a biotech age." With regards to its central premise, the pursuit of a creature by an obsessive man, the book has been compared to Moby-Dick — an influence that Leigh herself has acknowledged. With its depiction of the Tasmanian landscape and man's relationship to it, the novel is often critically analysed in terms of Ecocriticism. Brewer's study of the book applied ideas of the sublime to the text's treatment of loss and extinction; he labelled it a "peculiarly ecological novel".

== Reception ==
Critical reaction to The Hunter was primarily positive, and many commentators remarked positively on this being her debut novel. Kirkus Reviews called it a "capable, disquieting debut", and said that Leigh was "a writer to watch." Commenting on her writing style, Lisa Darnell of The Guardian noted that "It is rare to find a first-time novelist who can so confidently avoid the confessional — albeit by reinventing Hemingway."

The book was the recipient of several accolades. It won a Betty Trask Award, the Prix d'Astrolabe and was a New York Times Notable Book of the Year.

The success of the novel led to Julia Leigh being named by The Observer as one of 21 writers "for the next millennium", and led her to be accepted for a mentorship by the Nobel laureate, African-American author Toni Morrison. She was also named as a Young Novelist of the Year by The Sydney Morning Herald for the book.

== Adaptations ==
=== 2011 film ===
The book was made into the 2011 film of the same title directed by Daniel Nettheim, starring Willem Dafoe, Frances O'Connor, and Sam Neill. Filming took place in a variety of locations in Tasmania.

== See also ==
- Flora and fauna of Tasmania
- Tasmanian Gothic
- Tasmanian Wilderness
