= Like Minds =

2006 film by Gregory J. Read

- Like Minds film poster
- Directed by: Gregory J. Read
- Written by: Gregory J. Read
- Produced by: Piers Tempest; Jonathan Shteinman
- Starring: Toni Collette; Eddie Redmayne; Tom Sturridge; Richard Roxburgh; Kate Maberly
- Edited by: Mark Warner
- Distributed by: Arclight Films; Weinstein Co. Becker Group
- Release date: 9 November 2006
- Running time: 109 minutes
- Country: Australia
- Language: English

Like Minds is a 2006 Australian psychological thriller film written and directed by Gregory J. Read. It stars Toni Collette, Tom Sturridge, Richard Roxburgh, Kate Maberly, and Eddie Redmayne, in his film debut. The film was released in Australia on 9 November 2006. Like Minds was retitled Murderous Intent for its 2007 U.S. DVD release.

== Plot ==
The film opens with seventeen-year-old Alex Forbes, a privileged and intelligent student, engaging in thrill-seeking behavior with his friends. After the sudden death of his former roommate, Nigel Colbie, Alex is arrested and charged with murder. Forensic psychologist Sally Rowe is assigned to evaluate him. Through flashbacks, Alex recounts his time with Nigel at boarding school, revealing a deeply unsettling relationship shaped by manipulation, obsession, and dark philosophical beliefs.

Nigel, introduced as a reclusive student with a fascination for death and taxidermy, gradually infiltrates Alex’s life. Their dynamic becomes increasingly toxic after the suspicious death of their mutual friend Josh, which Alex believes Nigel orchestrated. Nigel’s influence deepens when he assists Alex with an essay and later introduces him to a secret society known as the Brotherhood — a modern offshoot of the Knights Templar. Nigel claims both he and Alex are destined for a sacred role within it. Their connection is symbolized by a playing card, the Jack of Spades, which on the back is inscribed "MY BELOVED MARACLEA." Nigel presents this to Alex as a marker of his identity and fate.

Following a failed romantic connection between Alex and a local girl named Susan, she is found murdered in a ritualistic manner. Her body is discovered surgically dissected and displayed in a grotesque position. Evidence surrounding her death, and Nigel’s increasing fanaticism, begins to unravel the sinister underpinnings of the Brotherhood. Nigel shares a Templar legend involving necrophilia and a woman named Maraclea, whose grave was desecrated as part of a power ritual. Nigel later attempts to coerce Alex into completing a similar ritual with Susan’s corpse, insisting that as her only love, Alex must perform the act to fulfill their shared destiny.

Alex appears to refuse — disturbed, grieving, and overwhelmed. However, later implications suggest he went through with it. Nigel taunts him about the event, claiming he "could smell [him] on her," and Alex’s increasing denial becomes less convincing. Although he protests in horror, Nigel declares it “doesn’t matter now” because Alex can still have his Maraclea.

As tensions escalate, Alex receives a letter from Nigel inviting him to the Colbie estate. There, Alex discovers a scene of horror involving Nigel's parents: Nigel’s mother is accidentally shot by his father during a confrontation, and the father is later killed by a gunshot meant for Nigel. Nigel, eerily calm, continues with the ritual, burning the organs and declaring their “union” inevitable. When Alex is disgusted by Nigel for committing incest and necrophilia with his mother, Nigel reiterates that Alex participated, accusing him again of violating Susan’s body. Though Alex denies it, the mounting evidence — his behavior, the imagery, and his silence — suggests otherwise.

Alex flees into the night, with Nigel pursuing him to a nearby railway. As an oncoming train approaches, Alex steps onto the tracks, daring Nigel to shoot him. Instead, Nigel pleads with him to move, insisting their fate has already been written. At the last moment, Nigel tackles Alex out of the way. Disarmed, Nigel falls to the floor and Alex takes the gun. Declaring that they are “one now,” Nigel reaches up and pulls the trigger, killing himself.

In the aftermath, Alex is seen pasting clippings into the Brotherhood’s red journal and carefully packs it into a bag, along with Nigel’s doctor’s case and a small, square box — heavily implied to contain Susan’s skull.

Meanwhile, Rowe delivers a lecture at the Ninth Annual Conference of Forensic Psychology, discussing the convergence of belief, delusion, and identity — “a merging of like minds.” Later, she finds a sealed envelope on her car bearing the Brotherhood’s insignia. Inside is a Jack of Spades inscribed with “MY BELOVED SUSAN.” Shortly after, she is called to the cemetery: Susan’s grave has been desecrated, her skeleton rearranged with crossed thigh bones, and the skull missing.

The film concludes with a flashback to Alex in interrogation, stating, “Nigel got what he wanted.” When Rowe asks what that was, he replies, “Eternity.” On a train, Alex sits behind a boy reading a history book. Still carrying the box, he leans forward and asks, “You like history?”

== Cast ==
- Eddie Redmayne as Alex Forbes
- Tom Sturridge as Nigel Colbie
- Toni Collette as Sally Rowe
- Richard Roxburgh as Sn. Dt. Martin McKenzie
- Patrick Malahide as Headmaster
- Jon Overton as Joshua Campbell
- Amit Shah as Raj Mehta
- Cathryn Bradshaw as Helen Colbie
- David Threlfall as John Colbie
- Kate Maberly as Susan Mueller
- Hugh Sachs as Reverend Donaldson

== Production ==
The film was shot on location in Yorkshire, England, and South Australia, reflecting its status as an Australian–British co-production. Scenes in the hall were filmed in Bradford Grammar School, Bradford, while the school chapel scenes were filmed both outside and inside the historic chapel of Giggleswick School, near Settle, in North Yorkshire, lending an authentic Gothic atmosphere to the film’s religious and psychological themes. Some external shots, including those of the surrounding estate, were taken on the Carlton Towers Estate, a Victorian stately home used to reinforce the film’s tone of inherited legacy and aristocratic decay. The train scenes, which feature prominently in flashbacks and transitions, were filmed on a stationary New South Wales U Set Single Deck Interurban Car TF6011, now owned by Richmond Vale Railway Museum in New South Wales.

== Box office ==
Like Minds grossed $34,840 at the box office in Australia. The film had limited theatrical release but developed a cult following after its DVD release under the title Murderous Intent.

== See also ==
- Cinema of Australia
- Knights Templar
- Folie à deux
- Leopold and Loeb
- Gestalt psychology
