= Australian Academy of Cinema and Television Arts =

Film and television organization

- Abbreviation: AACTA
- Formation: 18 August 2011
- Type: Film and television organisation
- Headquarters: South Melbourne, Victoria
- Location: 236 Dorcas Street, South Melbourne, Victoria 3205
- Region served: Australia
- President: Russell Crowe
- Patron: George Miller
- Chairman: Jack Christian
- Parent organisation: Australian Film Institute (AFI)
- Website: aacta.org

The Australian Academy of Cinema and Television Arts (AACTA) is a professional organisation of film and television practitioners in Australia. The academy's aim is "to identify, award, promote, and celebrate Australia's greatest achievements in film and television".

It was established in August 2011 with the backing of the Australian Film Institute (AFI) to act as its industry engagement arm and to administer the AACTA Awards (formerly the Australian Film Institute Awards, also known as the AFI Awards) which rewards achievements in Australian feature film, television, documentary and short films.

The academy is composed of 15 chapters, each of which represents different screen artists including actors, directors, producers and writers, and it is overseen by the academy's president and the Honorary Council. Australian actor Geoffrey Rush was the inaugural president from 2011 to 2017, and hosted the inaugural AACTA Awards in January 2012.

== Background ==
The Australian Academy of Cinema and Television Arts (AACTA), is a not for profit, membership based, organisation whose aim is "to identify, award, promote and celebrate Australia's greatest achievements in film and television." The academy is a subsidiary of the Australian Film Institute (AFI), a non-profit organisation which was established in 1958 to develop an active film culture in Australia and to foster engagement between the general public and the Australian film industry. The AFI was also responsible for administering the Australian Film Institute Awards (more commonly known as the AFI Awards), which until 2011 rewarded Australian practitioners in feature film, television, documentary and short film screen crafts. The academy receives funding by the AFI, and Australian state and federal governments.

In June 2011, the AFI proposed the establishment of an "Australian Academy". The objectives for the proposed academy was to raise the profile of Australian film and television in Australia and abroad, and to change the way it rewards talent by mimicking the methods used in foreign film organisations, such as Academy of Motion Picture Arts and Sciences (AMPAS) and British Academy of Film and Television Arts (BAFTA). The voting system would change through the establishment of an "Honorary Council", which will govern fifteen chapters composed of professionals from industry guilds and organisations including actors, directors, producers and screenwriters. It was also stated that the academy would not replace the AFI and past winners of the AFI Awards would "[...] constitute the founding heritage of an 'Australian Academy.'" When the announcement of the proposal was made, the AFI began the consultation phase where members of the public and screen industry gave their feedback on the proposed changes throughout June, 2011. Of the announcement Damian Trewhella, CEO of the AFI said, "We thought a better way to engage with the industry would be to try and improve our professional membership structure[...] It's quite a big improvement on the way the AFI does things."

By 20 July, weeks after the consultation period ended, the AFI announced that it would go ahead with the proposed changes and the Australian Academy. When asked about the timing of the announcement Trewhella stated that, "Based on the overwhelming industry support we have received, we are now confident that we are moving in the right direction, and therefore that we can move briskly to establish the initial phase of the Academy." On 18 August 2011, the AFI announced, in a special event at the Sydney Opera House, that the academy would be called the Australian Academy of Cinema and Television Arts (AACTA) and the inaugural awards ceremony would be renamed the AACTA Awards, but serve as a continuum to the annual AFI Awards. During the event it was also made known that the president of the inaugural awards would be Geoffrey Rush. On the night a new gold statuette was revealed, created by Australian sculptor Ron Gomboc, which depicts "a human silhouette based on the shape of the Southern Cross constellation."

== Structure ==
The academy, which has between 1,500 and 2,000 members, comprises fifteen Chapters, with each representing a different area of speciality in feature film, television, documentary and short film. It is overseen by the academy's president and the Honorary Council. The role of the Honorary Council is to determine policies and strategies for the way the academy rewards practitioners. The Chapters are as follows:

- Actors
- Animation
- Cinematographers
- Composers
- Costume Designers
- Directors
- Editors
- Executives
- Hair and Make-up Artists
- Media and Public Relations
- Producers
- Production Designers
- Screenwriters
- Sound
- Visual and Special Effects

=== Executives ===
- Russell Crowe – President
- Nicole Kidman – Vice President
- George Miller – Patron
- Cate Blanchett – Ambassador
- Jack Christian - Chairman

=== Honorary Councillors ===
- Stuart Beattie, 2011–present
- Jan Chapman, 2011–present
- Jonathan Chissick, 2011–present
- Abbie Cornish, 2011–present
- Rolf de Heer, 2011–present
- Elizabeth Drake, 2011–present
- Adam Elliot, 2011–present
- Antony I. Ginnane
- Nikki Gooley, 2011–present
- Ian Gracie, 2011–present
- David Hirschfelder, 2011–present
- Jessica Hobbs, 2011–present
- Cappi Ireland, 2011–present
- Peter James ACS ASC, 2011–present
- Claudia Karvan, 2011–present
- Aphrodite Kondos, 2011–present
- Andrew Mason, 2011–present
- Deborah Mailman, 2011–present
- Tony Murtagh, 2011–present
- Antony Partos, 2011–present
- Jan Sardi, 2011–present
- Fred Schepisi, 2011–present
- Emile Sherman, 2011–present
- Jack Thompson, 2011–present

== Events ==
=== Festival of film ===
The Festival of Film, which is held in conjunction with the Australian Film Institute, showcases the films in competition for the AACTA Awards, with the inaugural festival held in Sydney and Melbourne from October to November in 2011. The festival marks the beginning of the Australian film awards season, and members of the academy can commence voting for films in all categories, while members of the Institute vote for the Best Short Animation, Best Short Fiction Film and Members' Choice Award only.

=== Awards ===
The AACTA Awards replaced the previous Australian Film Institute Awards, but serve as a continuum to past ceremonies. The awards were first instituted by the Australian Film Institute in 1958 (as the Australian Film Awards) as part of the Melbourne International Film Festival, until 1972. Before 1969, awards were presented as a prize to non-feature films due to a lack of feature films produced in Australia. By 1976 competitive film awards were established and in 1987, awards for television was introduced. The awards were usually held at the end of each year in Melbourne but, prior to the announcement of the academy, the AFI announced that it would move the awards to January 2012 at the Sydney Opera House, in order to align them with the international film awards season. The awards are held over two events: the AACTA Awards Luncheon, a black tie event where accolades are handed out for non-feature and short films, film production, non-drama related television programs and the Raymond Longford Award, and the AACTA Awards Ceremony which hands out the awards in all other categories at a larger venue and is broadcast on television. Additionally, awards for achievements in foreign film were presented once at the AACTA International Awards in Los Angeles in 2012.

== See also ==
- Cinema in Australia
