= Ancient Futures =

1991 book by Helena Norberg-Hodge

- Cover for the 2009 edition
- Author: Helena Norberg-Hodge
- Language: English
- Published: 1991, 2009 (Sierra Club Books); 1992, 2000 (Rider Books); 2016 (Chelsea Green Publishing)
- Publication place: United States
- ISBN: 978-1578051625 (2009 edition)
- OCLC: 251196522
- Dewey Decimal: 307.1412
- LC Class: HN690.L33 N68 2009
- Website: Local Futures Books & Reports

Ancient Futures: Lessons from Ladakh for a Globalizing World, originally published with the subtitle Learning From Ladakh, is a book by Helena Norberg-Hodge. It was first published in 1991.

== Synopsis ==
The first part of the book describes the nature of the region of Ladakh when Helena first arrived in 1975, prior to the influx of Western ideas and material goods. In particular, Ladakhi women enjoyed high social status and family and community ties were very strong. The second part describes how Ladakh changed socially, ecologically and economically with development.

Ancient Futures discusses the notion of progress, and explores the root causes of the problems faced by a highly industrialized society. The book has been translated into almost 40 languages and is used regularly at the grassroots level to raise awareness of issues surrounding globalization and the loss of indigenous wisdom.
