= Oranges and Sunshine =

2010 film

- Theatrical film poster
- Directed by: Jim Loach
- Screenplay by: Rona Munro
- Based on: Empty Cradles by Margaret Humphreys
- Produced by: Camilla Bray; Iain Canning; Emile Sherman
- Starring: Emily Watson
- Cinematography: Denson Baker
- Edited by: Dany Cooper
- Music by: Lisa Gerrard
- Production companies: See-Saw Films; Sixteen Films; Little Gaddesen Productions; BBC Films; EM Media; South Australian Film Corporation; Screen NSW; Screen Australia; UK Film Council
- Distributed by: Icon Film Distribution
- Release dates: 8 October 2010 (PIFF); 1 April 2011 (United Kingdom); 9 June 2011 (Australia)
- Running time: 105 minutes
- Countries: Australia; United Kingdom
- Language: English
- Box office: $6.3 million

Oranges and Sunshine is a 2010 biographical drama film directed by Jim Loach, in his directorial debut, with a screenplay by Rona Munro, based on the 1994 book Empty Cradles by Margaret Humphreys. The film stars Emily Watson, Hugo Weaving and David Wenham.

== Plot ==
The film is based on the true story of Margaret Humphreys, a social worker from Nottingham who uncovered the scandal of "home children", a scheme of forcibly relocating poor children from the United Kingdom to Australia and Canada.

Deported children were promised "oranges and sunshine" but they instead got hard labour and life in institutions such as Keaney College in Bindoon, Western Australia. Many suffered physical and sexual abuse at the hands of the Congregation of Christian Brothers.

Despite the numerous death threats from those who try to stop her, Margaret is successful in reuniting estranged families, who are situated in Australia and the UK, and brings worldwide attention to the cause.

== Cast ==
- Emily Watson as Margaret Humphreys
- Hugo Weaving as Jack
- David Wenham as Len
- Richard Dillane as Merv Humphreys
- Tara Morice as Pauline
- Stuart Wolfenden as Bill
- Kate Rutter as Vera
- Lorraine Ashbourne as Nicky
- Federay Holmes as Charlotte
- Helen Grayson as Bureaucrat
- Ruth Rickman as Orphan
- Harvey Scrimshaw as Ben
- Molly Windsor as Rachel
- Neil Pigot as James
- Tammy Wakefield as Susan
- Adam Morgan as the Intruder
- Neil May as the Commuter
- Adam Tedder as the Doctor
- Mandahla Rose as nurse
- Greg Stone as Bob
- Aisling Loftus as Susie
- Geoff Morrell as Walter
- Russell Dykstra as Dan
- Chandran Owen as Pointing man in the street

== Production ==
=== Filming ===
Filming took place in Adelaide, South Australia, in Nottingham, and at Wirksworth in Derbyshire. Some interior scenes were filmed at the University of Leicester, Leicestershire, in Nottingham County Hall and in the porte-cochère of Nottingham railway station. Other locations that appear are a train on the Ecclesbourne Valley Railway; Australia House in London and an overview of Nottingham Council House and the Old Market Square.

A casting session was held in Nottingham to find one boy and one girl for the roles of Margaret's children.

== Reception ==
Rotten Tomatoes gives the film a score of 71% based on reviews from 73 critics, indicating generally positive reception. The website's critics consensus reads, "Grounded in a heartwrenching fact-based story, steered by Loach's sensitive direction, and led by a powerful performance from Watson, Oranges and Sunshine sidesteps its pacing problems and occasionally clichéd screenplay." Metacritic, which uses a weighted average, assigned the film a score of 60 out of 100, based on 17 critics, indicating "mixed or average" reviews.

Acclaimed film critic Roger Ebert awarded the film 3 out of 4 stars and quote, "a quietly stubborn force of nature, who persists."

=== Accolades ===
Award	Category	Subject	Result
AACTA Award (1st)	AFI Members' Choice Award	Camilla Bray, Iain Canning, Emile Sherman	Nominated
AACTA Award (1st)	Best Film	Camilla Bray, Iain Canning, Emile Sherman	Nominated
AACTA Award (1st)	Best Actor	David Wenham	Nominated
AACTA Award (1st)	Best Actress	Emily Watson	Nominated
AACTA Award (1st)	Best Supporting Actor	Hugo Weaving	Won
AACTA Award (1st)	Best Editing	Dany Cooper	Nominated
AACTA Award (1st)	Best Costume Design	Cappi Ireland	Nominated
AFCA Awards	Best Australian Film		Nominated
AFCA Awards	Best Actor	David Wenham	Nominated
AFCA Awards	Best Actor	Hugo Weaving	Nominated
AFCA Awards	Best Actress	Emily Watson	Won
ASE Award	Best Editing in a Feature Film	Dany Cooper	Won
ASSG Award	Best Achievement in Mixing in a Feature Film	Gethin Creagh	Won
ASSG Award	Best Achievement in Mixing in a Feature Film	Sam Hayward	Won
FCCA Awards	Best Film	Camilla Bray, Iain Canning, Emile Sherman	Nominated
FCCA Awards	Best Actor	David Wenham	Nominated
FCCA Awards	Best Actress	Emily Watson	Won
FCCA Awards	Best Supporting Actor	Hugo Weaving	Won
Inside Film Awards	Best Feature Film	Camilla Bray, Iain Canning, Jim Loach, Emile Sherman	Nominated
Inside Film Awards	Best Script	Rona Munro	Nominated
Inside Film Awards	Best Actor	David Wenham	Nominated
Inside Film Awards	Best Actress	Emily Watson	Won
Inside Film Awards	Best Editing	Dany Cooper	Nominated
Inside Film Awards	Best Music	Lisa Gerrard	Nominated
Inside Film Awards	Best Sound	Gethin Creagh	Nominated
Inside Film Awards	Best Sound	James Currie	Nominated
Inside Film Awards	Best Sound	John Hughes	Nominated
Inside Film Awards	Best Sound	Andrew Plain	Nominated
Inside Film Awards	Best Production Design	Melinda Doring	Won
Rome Film Festival	Golden Marc'Aurelio Award	Jim Loach	Nominated
Satellite Award	Best Actress	Emily Watson	Nominated
Satellite Award	Best Supporting Actor	Hugo Weaving	Nominated

== See also ==
- Cinema of Australia
