= Louise Harris =

Australian actress

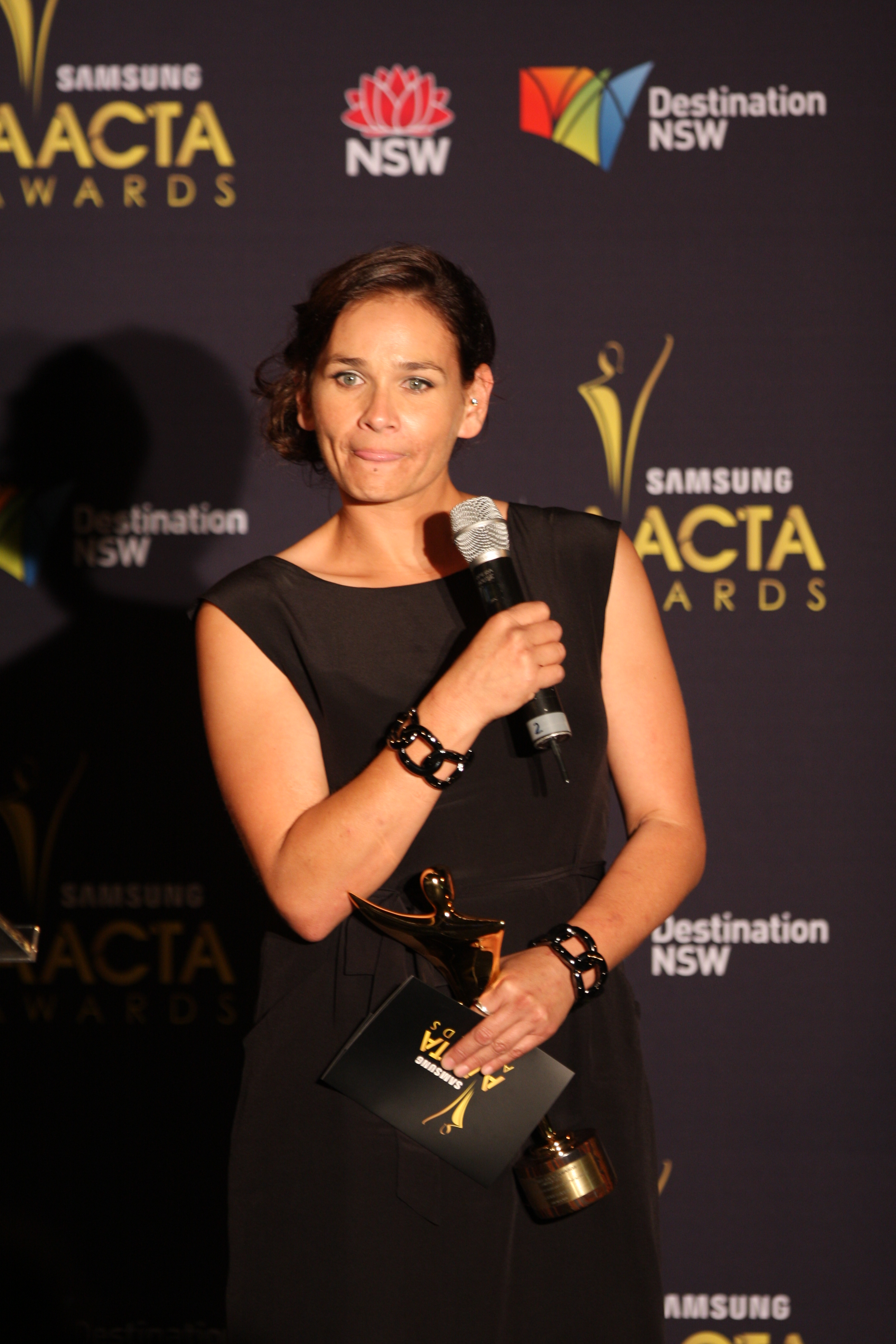
- Harris at the 2011 AACTA Awards, at the Sydney Opera House
- Occupation: Actress
- Years active: 2011–present
- Children: 1

Louise Harris is an Australian actress from Davoren Park, South Australia. She rose to prominence for playing Elizabeth Harvey in the film Snowtown (2011) (based on the Snowtown murders of 1999), for which she received an Australian Academy of Cinema and Television Arts Award for Best Supporting Actress.

== Personal life ==
Harris is a single mother with one son. Prior to landing her role as Elizabeth Harvey in Snowtown (2011), she was unemployed.

== Filmography ==
Actor
Title	Year	Role	Notes
Snowtown	2011	Elizabeth Harvey	AACTA Award for Best Actress in a Supporting Role; Nominated – Australian Film Critics Association Award for Best Actress; Nominated – Film Critics Circle of Australia Award for Best Supporting Actress
Wentworth	2013	Ronnie Katsis	Episodes: The Things We Do; The Girl Who Waited; No Place Like Home
The Turning	2013	Narrator	For "Boner McPharlin’s Moll" segment
