= The Family Tree (film) =

- Theatrical release poster
- Directed by: Vivi Friedman
- Written by: Mark Lisson
- Produced by: J. Todd Harris; Kathy Weiss; Mark Lisson; Allan Jones
- Starring: Dermot Mulroney; Hope Davis; Chi McBride; Max Thieriot; Britt Robertson; Selma Blair; Christina Hendricks
- Cinematography: Joplin Wu
- Edited by: Patrick Sheffield; Justine Halliday; Seth Flaum
- Music by: Stacey Hersh
- Production company: Driving Lessons
- Distributed by: Entertainment One
- Release date: August 26, 2011 (United States)
- Running time: 87 minutes
- Country: United States
- Language: English
- Box office: $6,035

The Family Tree is a 2011 American comedy-drama film directed by Vivi Friedman and written by Mark Lisson. The film stars Dermot Mulroney, Hope Davis, Chi McBride, Max Thieriot, Britt Robertson, Selma Blair, and Christina Hendricks. It was given a limited release in the United States by Entertainment One on August 26, 2011.

The music for the film was written by Stacey Hersh. Additionally, Amy Powers and Megan Cavallari co-wrote a song for the film.

== Plot ==
A mother and wife stricken with memory loss allows a dysfunctional family a second chance at harmony and happiness.

== Cast ==
- Dermot Mulroney as Jack Burnett
- Hope Davis as Bunnie Bernett
- Chi McBride as Simon Krebs
- Max Thieriot as Eric Burnett
- Britt Robertson as Kelly Burnett
- Selma Blair as Ms. Delbo
- Keith Carradine as Reverend Diggs
- Christina Hendricks as Alicia Bouche
- Rachael Leigh Cook as Rachel Levy
- Evan Ross as Josh Krebs
- Shad "Bow Wow" Moss as "T-Boy"
- Gabrielle Anwar as Nina Fouts
- Jane Seymour as Grandma Ilene
- Madeline Zima as Mitzy Steinbacher
- Colby French as Coach Sutton
- Jermaine Williams as Trey
- John Patrick Amedori as Paul Stukey
- Jake Richardson as Roy
- Ally Maki as Shauna
- Hannah Hodson as Ashley
- Evan Handler as Harvey "Harv" Drucker

== Release ==
Entertainment One acquired the North American rights to the film in June 2011, and set the release date of August 26, 2011. The film was given a limited release in the United States.

== Reception ==
=== Box office ===
The film made a total of $6,035 from two theaters in the U.S. during its two-week run.

=== Critical response ===
The film was largely panned by film critics. On review aggregator website Rotten Tomatoes the film received a rating of 10%, with a weighted average of 4.2/10, based on 20 reviews indicating "no consensus yet". Gary Goldstein of the Los Angeles Times wrote: "Director Vivi Friedman's inability to successfully reconcile the film's duality undercuts an eclectic cast gamely committed to Mark Lisson's thematically ambitious, if scattered, script." Chuck Bowen of Slant Magazine also gave a negative review, writing: "Sadly, The Family Tree squanders all [the] promise for the usual trite, bluntly written, and poorly staged testaments to love and family. Who needs that when you have a cast this game? A truly troubled family isn't, at the very least, this deadly dull." Stephen Holden of The New York Times heavily criticized the film, describing it as a "hyperactive screenplay by Mark Lisson that is so lacking in substance."
