= Margaret Humphreys =

British social worker and author (born 1944)

Margaret Humphreys CBE AO
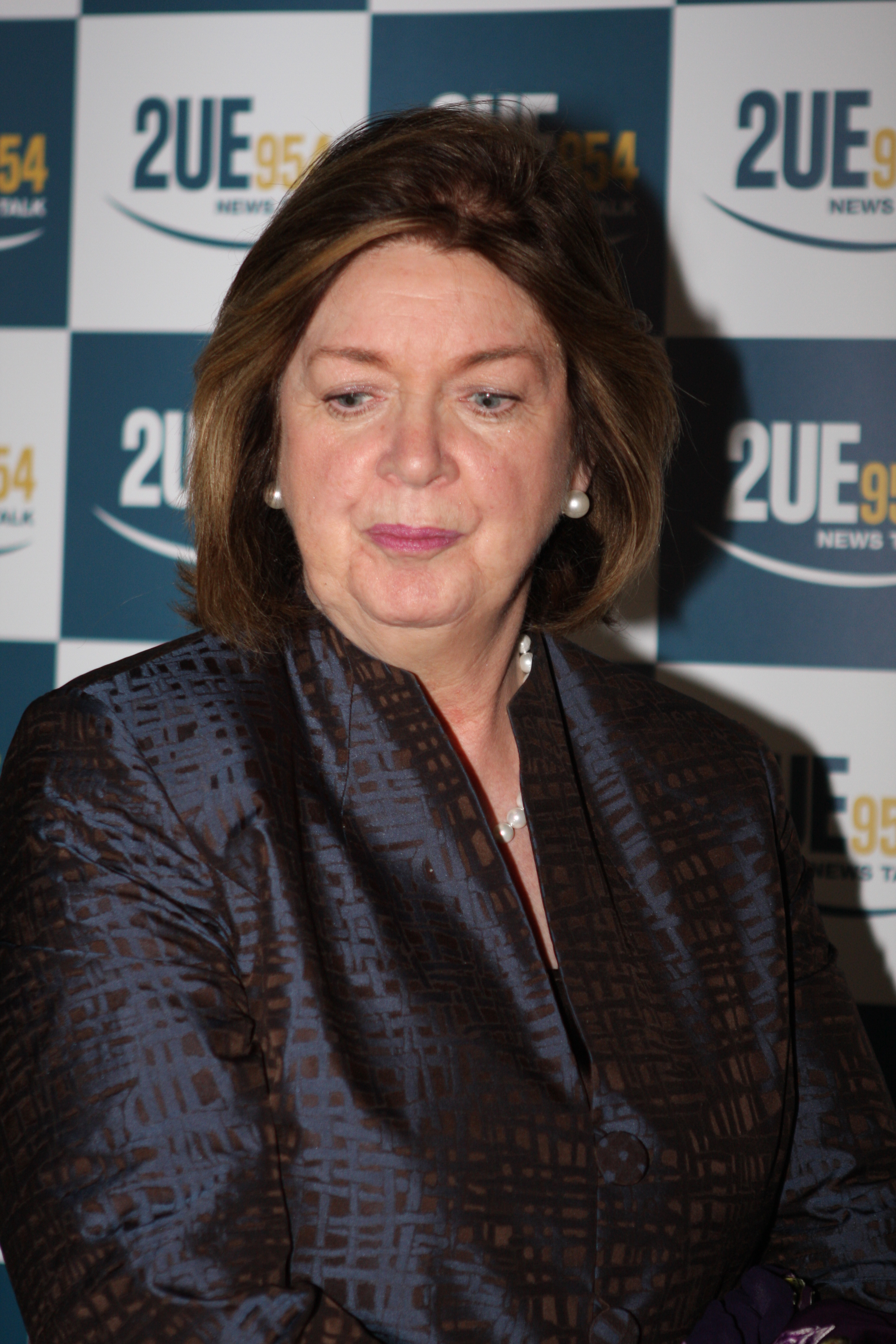
- Humphreys at Oranges and Sunshine premiere, in May 2011
- Born: 1944 (age 81–82); Nottingham, England, United Kingdom
- Occupations: Social worker, author

Margaret Humphreys (born 1944) is a British social worker and author from Nottingham, England. She worked for Nottinghamshire County Council operating around Radford, Nottingham and Hyson Green in child protection and adoption services. In 1986, she received a letter from a woman in Australia who, believing she was an orphan, was looking to locate her birth certificate so she could get married.

In 1987, she investigated and brought to public attention the British government programme of Home Children. This involved forcibly relocating poor British children to Australia, Canada, New Zealand, the former Rhodesia, and other parts of the Commonwealth of Nations often without their parents' knowledge. Children were often told their parents had died, and parents were told their children had been placed for adoption elsewhere in the UK. According to Humphreys, up to 150,000 children are believed to have been resettled under the scheme, some as young as three, about 7,000 of whom were sent to Australia.

Saving money was one of the motives behind this policy. The children were allegedly deported because it was cheaper to care for them overseas. It cost an estimated £5 per day to keep a child on welfare in a British institution, but only 10% of that, ten shillings, in an Australian one.

== Child Migrants Trust ==
Humphreys' investigations led to the exposure of the child migration scheme in two major articles by Annabel Ferriman in The Observer newspaper in July 1987 and to the establishment of the Child Migrants Trust, initially financed by Nottinghamshire County Council, her employer, and later by the British and Australian governments, and constituted as a registered charity under English law. The Trust was later established as an incorporated body to comply with Australian regulations and opened offices in Melbourne and Perth.

The primary aims of the Trust are to enable former British child migrants to reclaim their personal identity and reunite them with their parents and relatives. A key feature of the work of the Child Migrants Trust has been a sustained attempt via the mass media to develop public awareness of this previously obscure chapter in the social history of all the countries concerned. Humphreys took part in the British television documentary The Lost Children of the Empire screened in 1989 and later broadcast in Australia. A popular history book with the same title was published to coincide with the documentary. Its description of child migration policy begins with Britain's early involvement which started in the 17th century when children were sent from London to boost the population of Virginia—the first British outpost in America. Child migration continued over the next 350 years across three continents, including North America and Africa, ending in Australia in 1970.

== Christian Brothers ==
In 1998, a British Parliamentary Select Committee began an inquiry into child migration schemes, and published a report in August that year which criticized the policy in general, and particularly certain Roman Catholic institutions in Western Australia and Queensland such as the Christian Brothers where child migrants were housed and allegedly abused. The Western Australian Legislative Assembly passed a motion on 13 August 1998 apologizing to former child migrants.

== Australian affairs ==
In 2007, both the Queensland and Western Australia governments announced redress schemes for those who as children were abused while in State care. These schemes allow former British child migrants to apply for financial compensation if they do not wish to or cannot pursue civil litigation claims against the State.

== Honours and recognition ==
Humphreys was awarded the Medal of the Order of Australia in March 1993 and an honorary Master of Arts in 1996 by Nottingham Trent University in recognition of her work. She was named a Paul Harris Fellow in 1997 by the Rotary Foundation of Rotary International "in appreciation of tangible and significant assistance given for the furtherance of better understanding and friendly relations among peoples of the world". On 30 May 1998 an honorary master's degree was awarded to Humphreys by the Open University as an "ambassador both for Nottinghamshire and for Britain". More recently, in December 2011, Humphreys was awarded an honorary Doctor of Laws degree by the University of Nottingham.

Both Kevin Rudd and Gordon Brown, the respective Prime Ministers of Australia and Britain, in their public apologies in 2009 and 2010, thanked Humphreys for her campaigning and for her contribution to the cause of UK child migrants and their families.

In the 2011 New Year's Honours List, Humphreys was appointed a Commander of the Order of the British Empire (CBE) for services to disadvantaged people.

On 10 April 2019, Humphreys was made an Officer of the Order of Australia (AO) "for distinguished service to the community, particularly to former child migrants".

== Book and film ==
Empty Cradles, Humphreys' account of the formation and early struggles of the Child Migrants Trust, was published by Corgi in 1994. Its sales of over 75,000 copies helped to fund the work of the Trust at a critical time when British government grants had been stopped. Empty Cradles has been dramatised as the 2011 feature film Oranges and Sunshine, a 2010 British-Australian drama film co-production directed by Jim Loach with the leading roles played by Emily Watson as Margaret and Hugo Weaving and David Wenham as two former British child migrants.

== See also ==
- Kingsley Fairbridge

== Other sources ==
- Website of the Child Migrants Trust
- About the Child Migrants Trust
- "British children deported to Australia", BBC Inside Out.
