= Ron Gomboc =

Australian sculptor

- Born: Ratimir Marijan Gomboc; 6 November 1947 (age 78); Ljubljana, Slovenia
- Education: Claremont School of Art; Perth Technical College
- Known for: Sculpture
- Awards: Western Australian Citizen of the Year – 1993
- Website: http://www.gomboc-gallery.com.au

Ratimir Marijan "Ron" Gomboc is an Australian sculptor.

== Biography ==
Gomboc was born in 1947 in Ljubljana, Slovenia, Yugoslavia and received his early schooling in the town of Novi Vinodolski, Croatia. At the age of 13 he emigrated to Australia with his parents. On arriving in Australia he worked as a cabinet maker and builder before joining the Australian Army in 1969. After finishing his National Service in 1971 he enrolled in an art course at Claremont School of Art. During the 1970s he studied art and sculpture at Midland Technical College and Perth Technical College. At Midland he came under the tutelage of Guy Grey-Smith, a notable modernist artist.

== Art ==
In 1982 opened the Gomboc Gallery Sculpture Park in Middle Swan on the outskirts of Perth. In 1994 Ron Gomboc won the Mandorla Art Award with a wood, bronze, and copper sculpture called At the Gates

After the death of actor Heath Ledger, Gomboc was commissioned to create a memorial sculpture that was installed at Point Heathcote in Applecross. The three piece sculpture features yin and yang and a chessboard, a reference to Ledger's spiritual beliefs and his love of chess. Gomboc had been a friend of the Ledger family for over 30 years.

Gomboc was commissioned in 2011 by the Australian Film Institute to design a statuette for the Australian Academy of Cinema and Television Arts Awards.

== Honours ==
In 1993 Gomboc was Western Australian Citizen of the Year in the Art Culture and Entertainment category. He was awarded a Centenary Medal in 2001 for services to art.
