= Louise Harris (singer) =

British singer

Louise Harris (born 10 July 1998) is a climate activist and singer from Harpenden, Hertfordshire, known for her work with Just Stop Oil and her protest song 'We Tried', which condemns inadequate efforts by people in power to mitigate the climate crisis.

By December 2023 ‘We Tried’ had topped the UK iTunes chart. She had been arrested that November for singing the song outside one of then-Prime Minister Rishi Sunak's houses in London. She posted a video from a gantry above the M25 whilst taking part in a Just Stop Oil protest on 7 November 2022.

== Education ==
Harris attended Fitzwilliam College, Cambridge until 2019, studying psychology.
