= Vivi Friedman =

Finnish film director (1967–2012)

- Born: May 20, 1967; Helsinki, Finland
- Died: January 2, 2012 (aged 44); Tulsa, Oklahoma, U.S.
- Occupation: Film director
- Years active: 1991 - 2012

Vivi Friedman (May 20, 1967 – January 2, 2012) was a Finnish film director. She produced the majority of her work in the United States. During her career she worked on advertisements and short films and directed a feature-length film, The Family Tree in 2011.

== Early life and career ==
Born in Helsinki, Finland, Friedman spent her childhood years growing up in Nummela in southern Finland before moving to the United States to study at the University of Rochester in New York. She remained in the United States.

Before becoming a director she worked in several roles for television films and documentaries including roles as script supervision and location manager. She directed her first production, a television series called Team Suomi in 1994.

Friedman directed the short film Certainly Not a Fairytale in 2003 for the Fox Searchlight Searchlab development program. It starred Linda Cardellini and Jason Segel.

Her sole feature-length film was the 2011 black comedy The Family Tree starring Hope Davis, Keith Carradine, Dermot Mulroney and Selma Blair.

== Personal life and death ==
Friedman was in a long-term relationship with Steven Kaminsky, a post production supervisor.

She died on January 2, 2012, after a long battle with cancer aged 44.

== Filmography ==
=== Feature films ===
- The Family Tree (2011)

=== Short films ===
- Certainly Not a Fairytale (2003)

=== Television series ===
- Team Suomi (1994)
