= Julia Leigh =

Australian writer, film director and screen writer

- Born: 1970 (age 55–56); Sydney, New South Wales, Australia
- Education: BA, LL.B., Ph.D. in English
- Alma mater: University of Sydney, University of Adelaide, Australia
- Occupations: Director, screenwriter
- Years active: 1999–present

Julia Leigh (born 1970) is an Australian novelist, film director and screenwriter. Her debut feature film Sleeping Beauty was selected to screen in official competition at the 2011 Cannes Film Festival. She is an author of two award-winning novels, The Hunter (1999) and Disquiet (2008), for which she has been described as a "sorceress who casts a spell of serene control while the earth quakes underfoot".

== Early life ==
Born in 1970 in Sydney, New South Wales, Leigh is the eldest of three daughters. Her father was a physician and medical researcher while her mother a high school maths teacher.

Leigh majored in philosophy and law at the University of Sydney and was admitted to the NSW Supreme Court as a Legal Practitioner. For a time she worked as a legal advisor at the Australian Society of Authors where she shifted interest into writing. Her mentors have included authors Frank Moorhouse and, as part of the 2002–2003 edition of the Rolex Mentor and Protégé Arts Initiative, Toni Morrison. In 2009, Leigh was awarded a PhD in English from the University of Adelaide.

== Career ==
Leigh is the author of the novels The Hunter (1999) and Disquiet (2008), which received critical acclaim. Disquiet won the Encore Award for outstanding second novels in 2009. The Hunter was adapted into a 2011 feature film starring Willem Dafoe, Sam Neill and Frances O'Connor. Leigh also wrote and made her directorial debut with Sleeping Beauty, a 2011 film starring Emily Browning about a university student drawn into a mysterious world of desire. Her film was selected for the main competition at the 2011 Cannes Film Festival.

In 2016, she published an autobiographical work Avalanche about her own experiences with in-vitro fertilisation. In a review in the Sydney Morning Herald, Gretchen Shirm concluded that "at the heart of this book lies an overwhelming generosity, a willingness to impart personal experience for the insight it offers others". In 2015 Leigh was awarded the Peter Blazey Fellowship from the University of Melbourne for development work on Avalanche, and in 2016 was awarded the Australia Council Fellowship in Literature for work on a new novel.

Leigh has spent extensive periods in Paris and New York (where she was Adjunct Associate Professor of English at Barnard College).

== Filmography ==
- Sleeping Beauty (2011)

== Bibliography ==
- The Hunter (1999)
- Disquiet (2008)
