= Gregory J. Read =

Australian filmmaker (active 1992– )

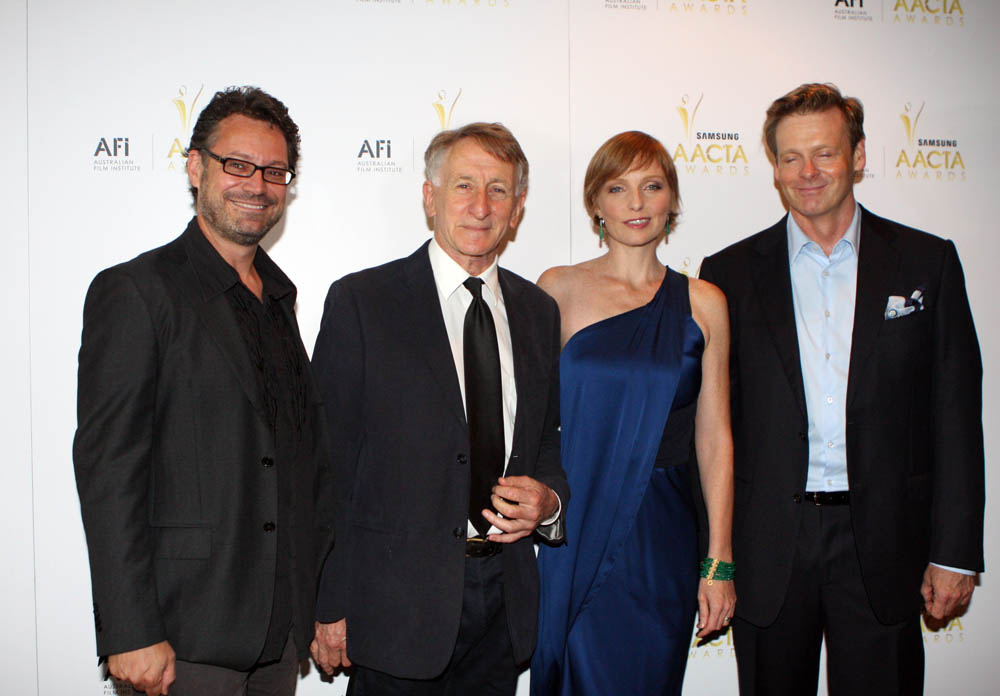
Gregory J. Read (l) with the cast of The Eye of the Storm (2011 film)

Gregory J. Read is an Australian filmmaker.

== Career ==
Read started his film career writing, directing, producing and editing documentaries: Spirits of the Carnival, Tides of Passage, and Photographers of Australia: Dupain, Sievers, Moore. In 2006 Read wrote and directed Like Minds starring Eddie Redmayne (in his feature film début), Tom Sturridge, Toni Collette and Richard Roxburough.

Although Like Minds was Read's feature film directorial début, he had assisted in the production of many low-budget Australian features and directed, produced, and/or art directed television commercials and music videos for performers such as Kate Ceberano, Iva Davis, Grant McLennon, and the Divinyls.

In 2008 he established Aerial Film Australia, a specialist aerial company with credits on films such as Unbroken, San Andreas, Pirates of the Caribbean: Dead Men Tell No Tales, Alien: Covenant, Lion, The Meg, The Shallows, Peter Rabbit, Pacific Rim: Uprising, Aquaman, and Spiderhead.

In 2011, he produced with Anthony Waddington the multi award-winning film The Eye of the Storm.

Read wrote, shot and directed the Australian Writers' Guild (AWGIE) award-winning (2020) feature documentary, Own The Sky chronicling David Mayman's journey in the development of the world's first real jetpack. He shot, field directed and associate produced the Akos Armont directed feature documentary Brabham (2020).
