= Helena Norberg-Hodge =

Swedish activist and documentary director

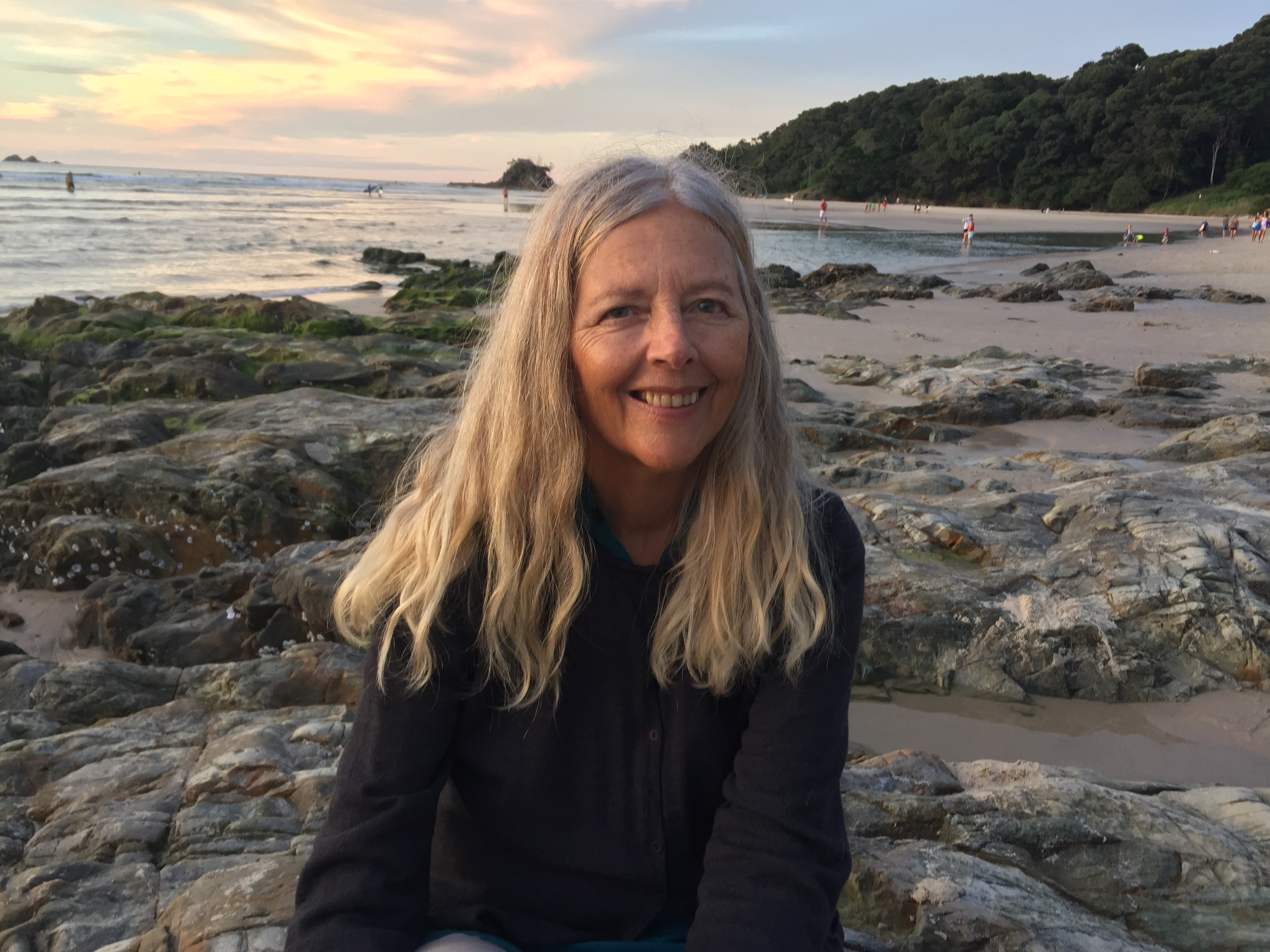
- Norberg-Hodge in 2015
- Born: 10 January 1946 (age 80); Sweden
- Occupations: linguist, writer, activist, documentary film maker
- Notable work: Ancient Futures; The Economics of Happiness
- Awards: 1986 Right Livelihood Award and 2012 Goi Peace Award

Helena Norberg-Hodge (born 10 January 1946) is the founder and director of Local Futures, previously known as the International Society for Ecology and Culture (ISEC) and pioneer of the Localization movement. Local Futures is a non-profit organization "dedicated to the revitalization of cultural and biological diversity, and the strengthening of local communities and economies worldwide."

Norberg-Hodge is the author of the international best-selling book Ancient Futures (1991), about tradition and change in the Himalayan region of Ladakh, available in multiple languages, as an ecobook and audiobook versions. She is also the author of Local is Our Future (2019), in which she advocates for localized alternatives to the global economy, particularly involving the creation of robust local food systems and democratic structures that can effectively resist authoritarianism. An outspoken critic of economic globalization, she co-founded – along with Jerry Mander, Doug Tompkins, Vandana Shiva, Martin Khor and others – the International Forum on Globalization (IFG) in 1994. She is a leading proponent of localization as an antidote to the problems arising from globalization, and founded the International Alliance for Localization (IAL) in 2014.

Norberg-Hodge produced and co-directed the award-winning documentary film The Economics of Happiness (2011), which lays out her arguments against economic globalization and for localization. Recently she initiated World Localization Day (WLD), which broadcasts globally online. In 1986, she was awarded the Right Livelihood Award for "preserving the traditional culture and values of Ladakh against the onslaught of tourism and development." In 2012, she received the Goi Peace Award for "her pioneering work in the localization movement".

== Education ==
Norberg-Hodge was educated in Sweden, Germany, Austria, the United Kingdom, and the United States. She specialized in linguistics, including studies at the doctoral level at the University of London and at MIT, with Noam Chomsky. Fluent in seven languages, she has lived in and studied numerous cultures at varying degrees of industrialization. The most influential of these in forming Norberg-Hodge's worldview is the Himalayan region of Ladakh.

== Ladakh ==
Ladakh, also known as Little Tibet, is a remote region on the Tibetan Plateau. Although it is part of India, it has more in common culturally with Tibet. Because it borders both China and Pakistan, countries with which India has had tense relations and frequent border disputes, the Indian government kept Ladakh largely isolated from the outside world. It was not until 1962 that the first road was built over the high mountain passes that separate the region from the rest of India, and even then the region was off-limits to all but the Indian military. In 1975, the Indian government decided to open Ladakh to tourism and 'development', and Norberg-Hodge was one of the first westerners to visit the region, accompanying a German film crew as a translator.

As she described in an interview with the Indian website Infochange, the culture she observed in those early years was a near-paradise of social and ecological well-being, but quickly broke down under the impact of outside economic forces: "When I first arrived in Leh, the capital of 5,000 inhabitants, cows were the most likely cause of congestion and the air was crystal clear. Within five minutes' walk in any direction from the town centre were barley fields, dotted with large farmhouses. For the next twenty years I watched Leh turn into an urban sprawl. The streets became choked with traffic, and the air tasted of diesel fumes. 'Housing colonies' of soulless, cement boxes spread into the dusty desert. The once pristine streams became polluted, the water undrinkable. For the first time, there were homeless people. The increased economic pressures led to unemployment and competition. Within a few years, friction between different communities appeared. All of these things had not existed for the previous 500 years."

Many of the changes that 'development' brought were psychological, as she described in the film version of Ancient Futures: "In one of my first years in Ladakh, I was in this incredibly beautiful village. All the houses were three stories high and painted white. And I was just amazed. So out of curiosity I asked a young man from that village to show me the poorest house. He thought for a bit, and then he said, 'We don't have any poor houses.' The same person I heard eight years later saying to a tourist, 'Oh, if you could only help us Ladakhis, we're so poor!' And what had happened is that in the intervening eight years he had been bombarded with all these one-dimensional images of life in the West. He'd seen people with fast cars, you know, looking as though they never worked, and with lots of money. And suddenly by comparison his culture seemed backward and primitive and poor."

In 1978, Norberg-Hodge founded The Ladakh Project, for which Local Futures is now the parent organization, in order to counter the overly rosy impressions of life in the urban consumer culture, and to re-instill respect for the traditional culture. She also helped establish several indigenous NGOs in Ladakh including the Women's Alliance of Ladakh (WAL), the Ladakh Environment and Health Organisation (LEHO), and the Ladakh Ecological Development Group (LEDeG). LEDeG has designed, built and installed a wide range of small-scale appropriate technologies, including solar water heaters, cookers, passive space heaters, and greenhouses. In 1986, Norberg-Hodge and LEDeG were awarded the Right Livelihood Award (also known as the 'Alternative Nobel Prize') in recognition of these efforts.

== Documentaries ==
Together with the Local Futures team, Helena has produced the following films and animations:

- Trade Gone Mad, 2024, narrated by Nathalie Kelley (4 minute animation)
- Closer to Home: Voices of Hope in a Time of Crisis, 2024 with Cyrus Sutton (33 minutes)
- The Power of Local, 2024 (42 minutes)
- Planet Local: A Quiet Revolution, 2023 (50 minutes)
- Local Food Can Save the World, 2023 (3 minutes)
- Local, A Story of Hope, 2022, also featuring Damon Gameau and Ella Noah Bancroft (8 minutes)
- Big Picture Activism, 2022, also featuring Damon Gameau and Ella Noah Bancroft (5 minutes)
- Small is Beautiful: Growing the Local Food Movement in Dartington / Totnes UK, (3 minutes)
- Young Farmers in Ladakh, 2021 (7 minutes)
- Insane Trade! - How Insane is Global Trade?, 2021 (3 minutes)
- Going Local: the solution-multiplier, 2017 (2 minutes)
- Localization: for People and the Earth, 2014 (7 minutes)
- The Economics of Happiness, 2012 (1 hour 8 minutes)
- Paradise with Side Effects, 2004 (40 minutes)
- The Future of Progress, 1992 (30 minutes)

== Publications ==
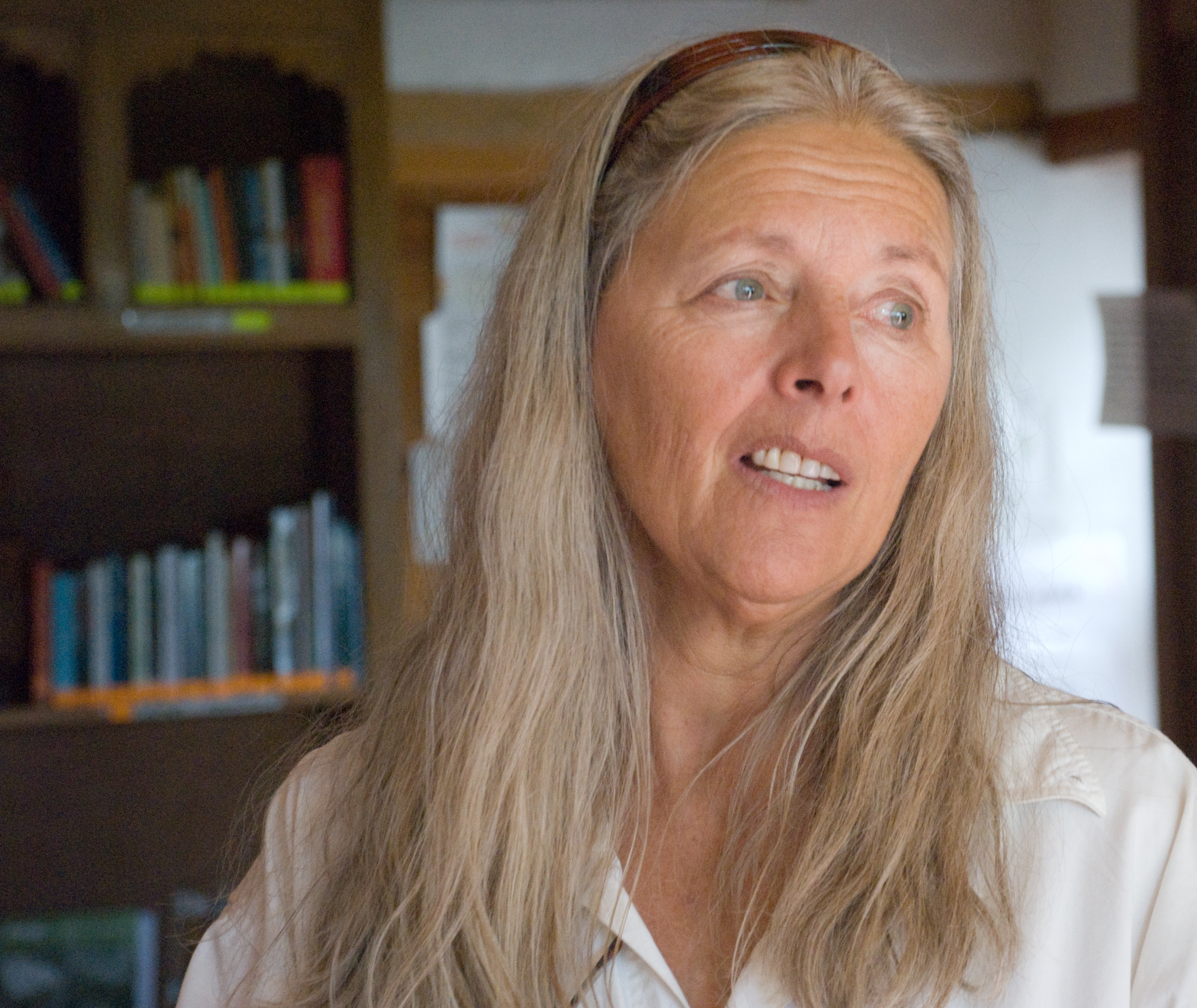
Norberg-Hodge in 2009

Norberg-Hodge's most recent book, Local is Our Future (2019) describes how a systemic shift from a globalized economy towards a network of decentralized, localized economies could address a number of problems simultaneously, ranging from economic inequality to the climate crisis to mental illness epidemics. The book has received praise from a number of public figures including Bill McKibben, Douglas Rushkoff, David Suzuki, Charles Eisenstein, Alice Waters, and others.

Her previous book, Ancient Futures: Learning from Ladakh (Sierra Club, 1991), was based on Norberg-Hodge's first-hand experience of Ladakh's traditional culture and the impacts of conventional development on it. The book was very well received, and has remained in print ever since. (A second edition, with a different subtitle, "Lessons from Ladakh for a Globalizing World", was published in 2009; a third edition, with no subtitle, is to be published in April 2016). Ancient Futures has been described as an "inspirational classic" by The London Times and "one of the most important books of our time" by author Susan Griffin. Together with the film version of the book, Ancient Futures has been translated into more than 40 languages.

Norberg-Hodge is also co-author of Life After Progress (Local Futures, 2022), Bringing the Food Economy Home: Local Alternatives to Global Agribusiness (Kumarian, 2002) and From the Ground Up: Rethinking Industrial Agriculture (Zed Books, 1992).

== Lectures, workshops, webinars and presentations ==
Norberg-Hodge lectures extensively in several languages – most often in English, Swedish, German, and Ladakhi, and occasionally in French, Spanish, and Italian. Over the years, lecture tours have brought her to universities, government agencies and private institutions. She has made presentations to parliamentarians in Germany, Sweden, and England; at the White House and the US Congress; to UNESCO, the World Bank, the European Commission, and the IMF; and at Cambridge, Oxford, Harvard, Cornell and numerous other universities. She also teaches regularly at Schumacher College in England. She frequently lectures and gives workshops for community groups around the world working on localization issues.

In addition, she frequently appears on television and radio programs around the world.

== Recognition ==
- Right Livelihood Award as recognition for her work with LEDeG, 1986.
- One of the world's 'Ten Most Interesting Environmentalists' by the Earth Journal (1993).
- In Carl McDaniel's book Wisdom for a Liveable Planet (Trinity University Press, 2005), she was profiled as one of eight visionaries changing the world today.
- Goi Peace Award from the Goi Peace Foundation in Japan (2012), "in recognition of her pioneering work in the new economy movement to help create a more sustainable and equitable world.
- The Environment Award at the Tignano Festival, Tuscany - Italy (2023).

== Affiliations ==
Norberg-Hodge is a co-founder of the International Forum on Globalization and the Global Ecovillage Network. She was a founding member of the International Commission on the Future of Food and Agriculture, launched with the support of the government of Tuscany, and was previously on the editorial board of The Ecologist magazine. She lives in Australia and the UK.
