= The Dragon Pearl =

2011 film

- Theatrical release poster
- Directed by: Mario Andreacchio
- Screenplay by: Philip Dalkin
- Story by: Ron Saunders; John Armstrong; Mario Andreacchio
- Produced by: Liu Zhi Jiang; Mario Andreacchio; Mark Patterson; Shan Tam; Pauline Chan; William W. Wilson III
- Starring: Sam Neill; Wang Ji; Robert Mammone; Jordan Chan; Li Lin Jin; Louis Corbett
- Edited by: Suresh Ayyar
- Music by: Frank Strangio
- Release date: 6 March 2011 (Adelaide Film Festival)
- Running time: 93 minutes
- Countries: Australia; China

The Dragon Pearl is a 2011 family film that follows the story of two people who meet in China to encounter a real live Chinese dragon, and also discover the mystery behind the whereabouts of his all-powerful pearl.

Directed by Mario Andreacchio, the film stars Wang Ji, Sam Neill, Robert Mammone, Jordan Chan and young stars Li Lin Jin and Louis Corbett. The screenplay was written by Philip Dalkin, based on the original script by John Armstrong, and the story is by Ron Saunders, John Armstrong and Andreacchio.

== Plot ==
When teenagers Josh (Louis Corbett) and Ling (Li Lin Jin) join their respective parents, Chris (Sam Neill) and Dr. Li (Wang Ji) on an archaeological dig in China they encounter something trapped beneath a temple beyond their wildest imagination. A real live Chinese dragon. Two thousand years earlier, to defend his kingdom, the dragon lent an emperor his all-powerful pearl.

Instead of being returned, the Pearl was buried with the Emperor beneath his palace, and helpless without its source of power the dragon has remained entombed ever since. With the Dragon Pearl buried on the excavation site, Josh and Ling implore their parents for help, but met with disbelief the children realize they must find the pearl on their own. However thereʼs one who does believe them: archaeologist Philip Dukas (Robert Mammone), who wants to seize the pearlʼs awesome power for his own sinister ambitions. The only way to stop him is for Josh and Ling to get to it first and return it to its rightful owner.

== Cast ==
- Sam Neill as Chris Chase, a renowned archeologist who has been invited to participate on a special archeological dig site in China.
- Wang Ji as Dr Li, the lead scientist on the excavation site. Tough but fair, Dr Li takes a no-nonsense approach to her work, but is patient and encouraging of all those around her. This earns her the love of those working at the site and from her own daughter Ling (Li Lin Jin).
- Jordan Chan as Wu Dong, a quirky keeper of an ancient temple that has inherited his responsibilities from his family.
- Robert Mammone as Philip Dukas.
- Li Lin Jin as Ling the daughter of the lead scientist on the excavation Dr Li (Wang Ji).
- Louis Corbett as Josh Chase, the son of Dr Chris Chase (Sam Neill), who is on vacation in China visiting the archeological excavation site his father is working on.

== Chinese dragons ==
Dragons are legendary creatures that appear in the myths of many cultures. In the West, European dragons are depicted as reptilian or serpent-like creatures that breathe fire. The Chinese dragon is completely different. Chinese dragons are benevolent creatures that give emperors their power and are representative of all the forces of nature. In many representations of the Chinese dragons, they are shown pursuing the elusive flaming pearl, the symbol of all power and knowledge.

There are nine different Chinese dragons. The dragon depicted in the story is the Golden Dragon, the most powerful and benevolent. There are many graphical depictions of the dragon, with variations according to location and historical period. The challenge was how to depict a "realistic" dragon in a live action movie: not only how the dragon should "look", but also how it should "move" and sound. The movie was given official permission by the Chinese government and film authorities for Western artists to produce a CGI dragon in consultation with Chinese advisers. The dragon was produced by Australian visual effects company Rising Sun Pictures, whose work spans major blockbusters like the Harry Potter films, The Lord of The Rings and The Green Lantern.

== Production summary ==
=== Co-production ===
The Dragon Pearl is the first treaty co-production between Australia and China. A Treaty Co-production is where two producers from two countries, bound by international law, agree to a cultural, creative and financial association to produce a film together. The final production is regarded simultaneously a full Chinese film as well as a full Australian film.

=== Locations ===
The film was shot entirely in China at the Hengdian World Studios, reputedly the largest studio complex in the world with over three million square metres of built sets. Also other locations in and around Hengdian were used. Hengdian is located around four hours drive south of Shanghai in the province of Zhejiang. All post production was conducted in Adelaide, South Australia. CGI and visual effects were created by two Adelaide based companies, Rising Sun Pictures and Convergen.
