= Snowtown (film) =

2011 Australian film by Justin Kurzel

- Theatrical release poster
- Directed by: Justin Kurzel
- Screenplay by: Shaun Grant
- Story by: Shaun Grant; Justin Kurzel
- Produced by: Anna McLeish; Sarah Shaw
- Starring: Daniel Henshall; Lucas Pittaway; Louise Harris
- Cinematography: Adam Arkapaw
- Edited by: Veronika Jenet
- Music by: Jed Kurzel
- Production companies: Screen Australia; South Australian Film Corporation; Warp Films
- Distributed by: Madman Films
- Release date: 19 May 2011
- Running time: 120 minutes
- Country: Australia
- Language: English
- Budget: $2–3 million
- Box office: $1.3 million

Snowtown (also known as The Snowtown Murders) is a 2011 Australian biographical crime drama directed by Justin Kurzel in his directorial debut and written by Shaun Grant based on the true story of the Snowtown murders.

== Plot ==
In the poor Adelaide suburb of Salisbury, 16-year-old Jamie lives with his distressed mother, Elizabeth Harvey (Louise Harris), and his brothers—including half-brother Troy, who rapes Jamie. One day, his mother's boyfriend takes indecent photographs of the boys. When the police are reluctant to intervene, Elizabeth is contacted by Barry, a gay cross-dressing man who introduces her to John. John, who despises paedophiles and homosexuals, continually harasses the boyfriend via means such as throwing kangaroo's blood and body parts at his house until he moves away. John begins to assume the role of Jamie's father figure. Barry tells John the names and addresses of paedophiles in the area, and John creates a wall with pictures and details about each, including notes saying things like "I'm coming for you".

Jamie finds himself slowly drawn into John's homophobic and violent tendencies, unable to escape his charismatic and intimidating dominance. On one occasion, John, aware that Jamie is being raped by his brother Troy, wants Jamie to stand up for himself, and in pursuit of this, gives him a gun and has Jamie shoot his dog. Meanwhile, John influences the rest of the neighbourhood with his extremely homophobic views and separates Barry from his younger boyfriend Robert. Only Troy seems to dislike John. Barry soon disappears, leaving behind only an answering machine message saying that he is going to Queensland. John brings Jamie in as the neophyte member of his small team who "bury men".

Shortly afterward, Jamie visits his drug-addicted best friend Gavin with John, who takes a dislike to Gavin. Later one night, John and Robert take Jamie into his garden shed and show him the bodies of Barry and Gavin. Distressed, Jamie lashes out at John but remains under his influence. Later, John and Robert torture Troy, and Jamie then kills the brutalised Troy in an act of mercy. Now desensitised, Jamie assists John in carrying out several murders. John and his team store the bodies in the vault of an abandoned bank in the town of Snowtown.

Jamie is persuaded by John to lure his step-brother Dave (Beau Gosling) to the bank building, ostensibly to look at a computer for sale. Jamie drives with him to the town, vaguely conscious of what he is doing, and leads Dave into the building, where he is met by John and Robert. Unaware of what is going on, Dave watches Jamie shut the door of the bank.

Against a black screen, captions reveal that South Australia Police discovered the remains of eight people stored in barrels in the bank vault of Snowtown on 20 May 1999, and the following day, John Bunting and Robert Wagner were arrested.

== Cast ==
- Daniel Henshall as John Bunting
- Lucas Pittaway as James "Jamie" Vlassakis
- Aaron Viergever as Robert Wagner
- David Walker as Mark Haydon
- Louise Harris as Elizabeth Harvey
- Keiran Schwerdt as Thomas Trevilyan
- Bob Adriaens as Gavin
- Frank Cwiertniak as Jeffrey
- Matthew Howard as Nicholas
- Marcus Howard as Alex
- Anthony Groves as Troy
- Richard Green as Barry
- Beau Gosling as Dave
- Craig Coyne as Ray
- Brendan Rock as Marcus

== Production ==
Screen Australia announced in March 2010 that it would be funding the film and Film Victoria provided $245,000. The film was produced by Warp Films Australia, a collaboration between Warp Films and distributor Madman Entertainment.

Peter Campbell of Warp Films Australia had to get the remaining suppression orders lifted so the film could be premiered.

Snowtown is Kurzel's first feature-length film as director. His short film Bluetongue was shown at the 2005 Cannes Film Festival.

Apart from Henshall and Green, the actors were locals with no acting experience, whom Kurzel had found in the area where the murders occurred, with most from Davoren Park. Kurzel himself grew up in the area and felt that using locals would move the film from being a one-dimensional horror show to a tragic human story showing what happens when people are disadvantaged. According to Kurzel, far from the "wow, I'm going to be a movie star" attitude that he had expected, he had some difficulty convincing them to take part.

The film was shot in Smithfield Plains, South Australia, an outer suburb of the Adelaide metropolitan area.

== Release ==
Snowtown premiered at the 2011 Adelaide Film Festival and won the festival's "Audience Award", and was selected as one of seven films from around the world that were shown at Critics' Week competitions that ran in parallel with the 2011 Cannes Film Festival. At Cannes, the film was awarded with a Special Mention.

The film was released in the United Kingdom by Revolver Entertainment and, in North America, IFC Midnight.

=== Box office ===
The film grossed $8,452 in the U.S., $1,133,435 in Australia, and $207,500 in France and the UK.

=== Critical reception ===
The film received generally positive reviews from critics. Review aggregator Rotten Tomatoes lists an 83% approval rating based on 65 reviews with an average rating of 7.5 out of 10 with the consensus "It's a bleak and brutal endurance test, but for viewers with the strength and patience to make it to the end, Snowtown will prove an uncommonly powerful viewing experience." On Metacritic, the film holds a 66 out of 100 rating based on 13 critics, indicating "generally favorable reviews".

Peter Bradshaw reviewed the film for The Guardian and gave it four stars out of five, saying that Snowtown "is a well made but gruesome and often unwatchably violent film." He concluded by stating that it reminded him of 10 Rillington Place and that while films "like David Fincher's Zodiac, or Jaime Rosales's The Hours of the Day, or Shohei Imamura's Vengeance Is Mine demystified the killer's macabre criminal career in their various ways; what Snowtown does is create a social-realist horror story showing the killer as parodic paterfamilias."

Fiona Williams of SBS awarded the film three-and-a-half stars out of five, commenting that director Kurzel "sidesteps the gore—mostly—to focus instead on the circumstances that enabled the atrocities to occur ... It's a gripping, discomforting watch."

Channel Nine entertainment reporter Richard Wilkins gave the film a rating of zero stars, stating "This is as close to a snuff movie as I ever want to see … I don't care if it's rooted in truth or not, it's appalling. I've seen it so you don't have to." This review was criticised by culture zine Pedestrian TV and was dismissed by Kurzel and actress Louise Harris.

In 2013, GamesRadar+ named John Bunting one of the "50 Creepiest Movie Psychopaths".

=== Awards and nominations ===
| Award | Category | Nominee | Result |
|---|---|---|---|
| AACTA Awards (1st) | Best Film | Anna McLeish | Nominated |
| AACTA Awards (1st) | Best Film | Sarah Shaw | Nominated |
| AACTA Awards (1st) | Best Direction | Justin Kurzel | Won |
| AACTA Awards (1st) | Best Adapted Screenplay | Shaun Grant | Won |
| AACTA Awards (1st) | Best Actor | Daniel Henshall | Won |
| AACTA Awards (1st) | Best Supporting Actress | Louise Harris | Won |
| AACTA Awards (1st) | Best Cinematography | Adam Arkapaw | Nominated |
| AACTA Awards (1st) | Best Editing | Veronika Jenet | Won |
| AACTA Awards (1st) | Best Original Music Score | Jed Kurzel | Nominated |
| AACTA Awards (1st) | Best Sound | Frank Lipson | Won |
| AACTA Awards (1st) | Best Sound | Andrew McGrath | Won |
| AACTA Awards (1st) | Best Sound | Des Kenneally | Won |
| AACTA Awards (1st) | Best Sound | Michael Carden | Won |
| AACTA Awards (1st) | Best Sound | John Simpson | Won |
| AACTA Awards (1st) | Best Sound | Erin McKimm | Won |
| AACTA Awards (1st) | AFI Members' Choice Award | Anna McLeish | Nominated |
| AACTA Awards (1st) | AFI Members' Choice Award | Sarah Shaw | Nominated |
| ADG Award | Best Director | Justin Kurzel | Nominated |
| APRA Award | Best Music | Jed Kurzel | Won |
| Film Critics Circle of Australia Awards | Best Film | Anna McLeish | Won |
| Film Critics Circle of Australia Awards | Best Film | Sarah Shaw | Won |
| Film Critics Circle of Australia Awards | Best Director | Justin Kurzel | Won |
| Film Critics Circle of Australia Awards | Best Screenplay | Shaun Grant | Nominated |
| Film Critics Circle of Australia Awards | Best Actor | Daniel Henshall | Won |
| Film Critics Circle of Australia Awards | Best Supporting Actress | Louise Harris | Nominated |
| Film Critics Circle of Australia Awards | Best Cinematography | Adam Arkapaw | Nominated |
| Film Critics Circle of Australia Awards | Best Editor | Veronika Jenet | Nominated |
| Film Critics Circle of Australia Awards | Best Music Score | Jed Kurzel | Nominated |
| Inside Film Awards | Best Director | Justin Kurzel | Nominated |
| Inside Film Awards | Best Cinematography | Adam Arkapaw | Nominated |
| Inside Film Awards | Best Editing | Veronika Jenet | Won |
| Inside Film Awards | Best Production Design | Fiona Crombie | Nominated |
| Inside Film Awards | Best Sound | Frank Lipson | Nominated |
| Inside Film Awards | Best Sound | Andrew McGrath | Nominated |
| Inside Film Awards | Best Sound | Des Kenneally | Nominated |
| Inside Film Awards | Best Sound | Michael Carden | Nominated |
| Inside Film Awards | Best Sound | John Simpson | Nominated |
| Inside Film Awards | Best Sound | Erin McKimm | Nominated |

== See also ==
- List of films featuring psychopaths and sociopaths
