= The Eye of the Storm (2011 film) =

- Theatrical release poster
- Directed by: Fred Schepisi
- Screenplay by: Judy Morris
- Based on: The Eye of the Storm by Patrick White
- Produced by: Gregory J. Read; Antony Waddington
- Starring: Geoffrey Rush; Charlotte Rampling; Judy Davis
- Cinematography: Ian Baker
- Edited by: Kate Williams
- Music by: Paul Grabowsky
- Distributed by: Transmission
- Release date: 8 September 2011
- Running time: 119 minutes
- Country: Australia
- Language: English

The Eye of the Storm is a 2011 Australian drama film directed by Fred Schepisi. It is an adaptation of Patrick White's 1973 novel of the same name. It stars Geoffrey Rush, Charlotte Rampling and Judy Davis. It won the critics' award for best Australian feature at the 2011 Melbourne International Film Festival and had a September 2011 theatrical release.

== Plot ==
In a Sydney suburb, two nurses, a housekeeper, and a solicitor attend to Elizabeth Hunter as her expatriate son and daughter convene at her deathbed. In dying, as in living, Mrs. Hunter remains a formidable force on those around her. It is via Mrs Hunter's authority over living that her household and children vicariously face death and struggle to give consequence to life.

Estranged from a mother who was never capable of loving them, Sir Basil, a famous but struggling actor in London and Dorothy, an impecunious French princess, attempt to reconcile with her. In doing so, they are reduced from states of worldly sophistication to floundering life.

The children unite in a common goal — to leave Australia with their vast inheritance. Moving through Sydney's social scene, they search for a way to fulfil their desire. Using the reluctant services of their family lawyer, Arnold Wyburd, who was long in love with Mrs Hunter, they scheme to place their mother in a society nursing home to expedite her demise.

Panic sets in as the staff senses the impending end of their eccentric world. Mrs Hunter confesses her profound disappointment at failing to recreate the state of humility and grace she experienced when caught in the eye of a cyclone fifteen years earlier.

For the first time in their lives, the meaning of compassion takes the children by surprise. During a ferocious storm, Mrs Hunter finally dies, not through a withdrawal of will but by an assertion of it. In the process of dying, she re-lives her experience in the cyclone. Standing on a beach, she is calm and serene as devastation surrounds her.

== Cast ==
- Geoffrey Rush as Basil Hunter
- Charlotte Rampling as Elizabeth Hunter
- Judy Davis as Dorothy de Lascabanes
- John Gaden as Arnold Wyburd
- Robyn Nevin as Lal
- Helen Morse as Lotte
- Colin Friels as Athol Shreve
- Dustin Clare as Col
- Liz Alexander as Cherry Cheesman
- Maria Theodorakis as Mary DeSantis
- Alexandra Schepisi as Flora
- Louise Siversen as Carol
- Heather Mitchell as June
- Benita Collings as Lady at lunch
- Laurent Boulanger as French waiter

== Awards ==
Ceremony	Recipient	Category	Result
2011 Asia Pacific Screen Awards	Judy Davis	Best Performance by an Actress	Nominated
AACTA Awards (1st)	Antony Waddington; Gregory J. Read; Fred Schepisi	Best Film	Nominated
AACTA Awards (1st)	Fred Schepisi	Best Direction	Nominated
AACTA Awards (1st)	Judy Morris	Best Adapted Screenplay	Nominated
AACTA Awards (1st)	Geoffrey Rush	Best Actor in a Leading Role	Nominated
AACTA Awards (1st)	Judy Davis	Best Actress in a Leading Role	Won
AACTA Awards (1st)	Charlotte Rampling	Best Actress in a Leading Role	Nominated
AACTA Awards (1st)	John Gaden	Best Actor in a Supporting Role	Nominated
AACTA Awards (1st)	Helen Morse	Best Actress in a Supporting Role	Nominated
AACTA Awards (1st)	Antony Waddington; Gregory J. Read; Fred Schepisi	AFI Members' Choice Award	Nominated
AACTA Awards (1st)	Melinda Doring	Best Production Design	Won
AACTA Awards (1st)	Terry Ryan	Best Costume Design	Won
2011 Inside Film Awards	Antony Waddington; Gregory J. Read; Fred Schepisi	Best Feature Film	Nominated
2011 Inside Film Awards	Geoffrey Rush	Best Actor in a Leading Role	Nominated
2011 Inside Film Awards	Judy Davis	Best Actress in a Leading Role	Nominated
Melbourne International Film Festival		The Age Critics' Award for Best Australian Feature Film	Won
Rome International Film Festival		Jury Special Prize	Won
