= The Hunter (2011 Australian film) =

2011 Australian film by Daniel Nettheim

- Theatrical release poster
- Directed by: Daniel Nettheim
- Screenplay by: Alice Addison
- Story by: Wain Fimeri; Daniel Nettheim
- Based on: The Hunter by Julia Leigh
- Produced by: Vincent Sheehan
- Starring: Willem Dafoe; Frances O'Connor; Sam Neill
- Cinematography: Robert Humphreys
- Edited by: Roland Gallois
- Music by: Michael Lira; Andrew Lancaster; Matteo Zingales
- Production company: Porchlight Films
- Distributed by: Madman Entertainment (Australia) (New Zealand); Magnolia Pictures (United States); Entertainment One (Canada)
- Release date: 6 October 2011 (Australia)
- Running time: 102 minutes
- Country: Australia
- Language: English
- Box office: $1.6 million

The Hunter is a 2011 Australian drama film, directed by Daniel Nettheim and produced by Vincent Sheehan, based on the 1999 novel of the same name by Julia Leigh. It stars Willem Dafoe, Sam Neill, and Frances O'Connor.

== Plot ==
Mercenary Martin David is hired by military biotech company, Red Leaf, to go to Tasmania and gather samples of a supposedly extinct marsupial, the thylacine (Tasmanian tiger), with further instructions to kill all remaining tigers to ensure no competing organisation will get their DNA.

Posing as a university biologist, Martin lodges in the home of the Armstrong family: Lucy and her two young children, Katie and Jamie. Lucy is perpetually benumbed from prescribed medication, taken after the disappearance of her environmentalist husband, Jarrah Armstrong. Speculation surrounds Jarrah's disappearance, particularly with regard to a longstanding conflict between the local loggers who are in desperate need of jobs, and the 'greenies', a group of environmentalists who have set up road blocks to the forest to prevent its deforestation. Martin goes into the bush for twelve days at a time, setting up various steel traps and makeshift snares, while waiting patiently to see if a tiger will surface. On each excursion, Martin leaves the family a map with his coordinates, to be used to search for him if he fails to return on schedule. During his short stays at the Armstrongs' to resupply, Martin slowly befriends the children, and discovers that Lucy's medication is delivered to her by Jack Mindy, who has been unofficially looking in on the family. Martin confiscates Lucy's medication, and bathes her while she is unconscious, after realising the detrimental effects of her dependency.

During one return from the bush, Martin finds Lucy has recovered from the symptoms of her addiction. Jamie provides Martin with a clue as to the tiger's whereabouts: a drawing of the tiger near trees and small bodies of water. From the drawing, Martin is able to deduce the tiger's location on his map. On his next trip out, Martin stumbles across Jarrah's skeletal remains and discovers that he had been shot through the head. Martin gives him a proper burial, but does not reveal his findings to the Armstrong family. On his return to the Armstrong house, Lucy informs him that Red Leaf had initially contracted Jarrah to locate the tiger, a pursuit he eventually abandoned in favour of taking up an environmental cause to protect wildlife and that Red Leaf wanted Jarrah to find the tiger because they believed that it had a paralysing venom in its bite.

While hiking to check his traps, Martin is ambushed by a rival Red Leaf operative sent to replace him. The man binds Martin's hands and instructs Martin to lead him to the tiger's cave, but Martin instead leads the operative past one of his steel traps. The operative steps on the trap, and its metal teeth bind his leg. The operative drops both rifles. Martin frees his hands, picks up one of the rifles, and kills the operative just as the operative frees himself from the trap and lunges for the other rifle. Searching the man's pockets, Martin finds the map he left with the Armstrong's, and realises the operative has been to their house. Martin returns to the Armstrong residence to find it burnt down. Confronting Mindy, he learns that Lucy and Katie had perished in the fire that Mindy claims broke out by accident, but Jamie survived and was taken by the authorities. Martin sets out into the bush once more to find the Tasmanian tiger and put an end to Red Leaf's pursuit. He finally finds the creature and reluctantly shoots it, then proceeds to cremate it in order to remove all traces of its existence.

Martin returns to town and calls Red Leaf, informing them that what they are looking for is "gone forever". He then goes to a school where Jamie sits alone on a bench. When Jamie sees Martin, he runs excitedly toward him and the two embrace.

== Cast ==
- Willem Dafoe as Martin David (The Hunter)
- Frances O'Connor as Lucy Armstrong
- Sam Neill as Jack Mindy
- Morgan Davies (Note: Credited as Morgana Davies) as Sass (Katie)
- Finn Woodlock as Bike (Jamie)
- Jacek Koman as Middleman
- Callan Mulvey as Rival Hunter
- John Brumpton as Publican
- Dan Wyllie as Pool Player
- Sullivan Stapleton as Doug
- Jamie Timony as Free
- Dan Spielman as Simon
- Maia Thomas as Shakti
- Marc Watson-Paul as Jarrah Armstrong
- John Brumpton as Publican
- Mark Hennessy as Martin Stunt Double

== Production ==
The Hunter is a drama film, directed by Daniel Nettheim and produced by Vincent Sheehan, based on the 1999 novel of the same name by Julia Leigh.

Willem Dafoe, Sam Neill, and Frances O'Connor were cast in the lead roles.

=== Filming locations ===
The movie was filmed entirely in Tasmania. The filming locations included:

- The foyer of the Hotel Grand Chancellor in Hobart, as a hotel at a Paris airport
- The top of Mount Wellington, for a snowy blizzard scene
- Moonah Primary School, Moonah, as an Institute
- Lenna of Hobart in Battery Point, as a Paris hotel room
- Loggers Pub at Mount Field National Park
- Westerway Petrol and General Store, Westerway

== Release ==
Dafoe flew to Tasmania for the film's premiere at the State Cinema in North Hobart on 6 October 2011.

== Critical reception ==
The film received generally favourable reviews from critics. On Rotten Tomatoes holds a 72% rating based on 90 reviews, with an average rating of 6.54/10. The site's critical consensus states that "The Hunter occasionally suffers from predictability, but Willem Dafoe gives a terrific performance as an obsessive hunter on the trail of a mysterious beast." On Metacritic, the film holds a score of 63 out of 100, based on reviews from 15 critics.

Kim Newman from Empire gave the film three stars, calling The Hunter "a slow-burning, beautifully shot, and highly understated philosophical thriller".

=== Accolades ===
Award	Category	Subject	Result
AACTA Award (1st)	AFI Members' Choice Award	Vincent Sheehan	Nominated
AACTA Award (1st)	Best Film	Vincent Sheehan	Nominated
AACTA Award (1st)	Best Direction	Daniel Nettheim	Nominated
AACTA Award (1st)	Best Adapted Screenplay	Alice Addison	Nominated
AACTA Award (1st)	Best Actor	Willem Dafoe	Nominated
AACTA Award (1st)	Best Actress	Frances O'Connor	Nominated
AACTA Award (1st)	Best Supporting Actor	Sam Neill	Nominated
AACTA Award (1st)	Best Supporting Actress	Morgan Davies	Nominated
AACTA Award (1st)	Best Cinematography	Robert Humphreys	Won
AACTA Award (1st)	Best Music	Michael Lira	Won
AACTA Award (1st)	Best Music	Matteo Zingales	Won
AACTA Award (1st)	Best Music	Andrew Lancaster	Won
AACTA Award (1st)	Best Sound	Sam Petty	Nominated
AACTA Award (1st)	Best Sound	David Lee	Nominated
AACTA Award (1st)	Best Sound	Robert Mackenzie	Nominated
AACTA Award (1st)	Best Sound	Les Fiddess	Nominated
AACTA Award (1st)	Best Sound	Tony Murtagh	Nominated
AACTA Award (1st)	Best Sound	Tom Heuzenroeder	Nominated
AACTA Award (1st)	Best Production Design	Steven Jones-Evans	Nominated
AACTA Award (1st)	Best Costume Design	Emily Seresin	Nominated
