= 2nd AACTA Awards =

Australian film and television awards ceremony

- Date: 28 January 2013 and 30 January 2013
- Site: The Star Event Centre; Sydney, New South Wales
- Hosted by: Adam Elliot; Russell Crowe

Highlights
- Best Film: The Sapphires
- Most awards: The Sapphires (11)
- Most nominations: The Sapphires (12)

Television coverage
- Network: Network Ten
- Ratings: 318,000

The 2nd Australian Academy of Cinema and Television Arts Awards (generally known as AACTA Awards) are a series of awards which includes the 2nd AACTA Awards Luncheon, the 2nd AACTA Awards ceremony and the 2nd AACTA International Awards. The former two events were held at the Star Event Centre, in Sydney, New South Wales on 28 January and 30 January 2013, respectively. Presented by the Australian Academy of Cinema and Television Arts (AACTA), the awards celebrated the best in Australian feature film, television, documentary and short film productions of 2012. The AACTA Awards ceremony was televised on Network Ten. Actor Russell Crowe hosted the show. These awards are a continuum of the Australian Film Institute Awards (known as the AFI Awards), established in 1958 and presented until 2010, which was rebranded the AACTA Awards when the Australian Film Institute (AFI) established AACTA in 2011.

On 9 May 2012, the Academy revealed a new category for Best Reality Television Series, due to a growth in reality programming in Australia. The recipient of the Raymond Longford Award was Al Clark, for his work as a film producer, and the Byron Kennedy Award was handed out posthumously to Sarah Watt. The nominees were announced during a press conference on 3 December 2012. The Sapphires won eleven of the thirteen film awards it was nominated for, including Best Film, Best Direction, Best Actor, Best Actress and Best Supporting Actress. Other feature film winners were Wish You Were Here with two awards, and Lore, Not Suitable for Children and Iron Sky with one. In the television categories Howzat! Kerry Packer's War and Redfern Now won two awards, and A Moody Christmas, The Adventures of Figaro Pho, Agony Aunts, The Amazing Race Australia, Jack Irish: Bad Debts, Lowdown, Puberty Blues, Rake and Underbelly: Badness with one.

== Background ==
On 5 May 2012, the Academy announced a new category for Best Reality Television Series, due to the growth of reality television productions in Australia. Reality television productions could previously be submitted in the Best Light Entertainment Series category. The twenty-three films eligible to compete for film awards were revealed on 29 August 2012. Of those competing, Burning Man was made eligible, after being ineligible to compete at the previous awards due to a change in release date. The details of the first nominees were also announced that day, in the non-feature film categories for: Best Feature Length Documentary, Best Short Fiction Film and Best Short Animation, as determined by specially formed juries. Round one of voting took place between 5 October and 8 November 2012 to determine the winners of the aforementioned categories, and to decide the nominees in the feature-film awards. For television, juries were established to select the nominees and winners.

On 3 December 2012, the full list of nominees for feature-film, television and non-feature films were released during a press conference in Sydney. Of the nominees, The Sapphires (2012) received the most feature-film nominations with twelve, including Best Film, Best Direction for Wayne Blair, Best Adapted Screenplay for Keith Thompson and Tony Briggs, Best Lead Actor for Chris O'Dowd, Best Lead Actress for Deborah Mailman and Best Supporting Actress for Jessica Mauboy. In television, Puberty Blues received the most nominations with six. These include Best Drama Series, Best Actress - Drama for Ashleigh Cummings, Best Guest or Supporting Actor - Drama for Daniel Wyllie, and Best Guest or Supporting Actress - Drama for Susan Prior. Round two of voting, to determine the feature-film award winners, commenced on the day of the nominations announcement, and concluded on 13 December 2012.

== Special awards ==
A call for recommendations, for the Raymond Longford Award, was made on 13 September 2012 with the submission period ending on 28 September. It was announced on 22 November Al Clark will receive the award, for his work as a film producer, at the AACTA Awards Luncheon in 2013. The Byron Kennedy Award was presented posthumously to Sarah Watt, an Australian film director. Watt was chosen for: "her brave, innovative filmmaking. Painter, photographer, animator, she brought consummate skill and elegance to the live action form. Without pretension, her work broke all the rules, yet her singular view connected to a wide audience by its profound emotional honesty." The accolade was presented at the AACTA Awards Ceremony to her son Clem.

== Ceremony ==
The AACTA Awards Luncheon and Ceremony were held at The Star Event Centre in Sydney, New South Wales on 28 and 30 January, respectively. The AACTA Awards Luncheon, which handed out awards for technical achievements across film and television, as well as all non-feature categories, was hosted by Adam Elliot. The AACTA Awards Ceremony, presenting honours in all other categories, was originally to be presided over by Hugh Sheridan, but due to conflicting schedules he was replaced by Russell Crowe. The latter presentation which had been previously shown on Nine Network since 2005, aired on Network Ten on the day of the ceremony, but as an edited version of the event.

== Winners and nominees ==
=== Feature film ===
Winners will be listed first and highlighted in boldface.

Best Film	Best Direction
**The Sapphires** – **Rosemary Blight** and **Kylie du Fresne**; Burning Man – Andy Paterson and Jonathan Teplitzky; Lore – Karsten Stöter, Liz Watts, Paul Welsh and Benny Drechsel; Wish You Were Here – Angie Fielder	**Wayne Blair** – **The Sapphires**; Jonathan Teplitzky – Burning Man; Cate Shortland – Lore; Kieran Darcy-Smith – Wish You Were Here
Best Original Screenplay	Best Adapted Screenplay
**Wish You Were Here** – **Kieran Darcy-Smith** and **Felicity Price**; Burning Man – Jonathan Teplitzky; Mental – PJ Hogan; Not Suitable for Children – Michael Lucas	**The Sapphires** – **Keith Thompson** and **Tony Briggs**; Lore – Cate Shortland and Robin Mukherjee
Best Lead Actor	Best Lead Actress
**Chris O'Dowd** –**The Sapphires** as **Dave**; Joel Edgerton – Wish You Were Here as Dave Flannery; Matthew Goode – Burning Man as Tom; Guy Pearce – 33 Postcards as Dean Randall	**Deborah Mailman** – **The Sapphires** as **Gail McCrae**; Toni Collette – Mental as Shaz; Felicity Price – Wish You Were Here as Alice Flannery; Sarah Snook – Not Suitable for Children as Stevie
Best Supporting Actor	Best Supporting Actress
**Antony Starr** – **Wish You Were Here** as **Jeremy King**; Ryan Corr – Not Suitable for Children as Gus; Liev Schreiber – Mental as Trevor Blundell; Gary Waddell – The King is Dead as King	**Jessica Mauboy** – **The Sapphires** as **Julie McCrae**; Essie Davis – Burning Man as Karen; Rebecca Gibney – Mental as Shirley Moochmoore; Deborah Mailman – Mental as Sandra
Best Cinematography	Best Editing
**The Sapphires** – **Warwick Thornton**; Burning Man – Garry Phillips; Lore – Adam Arkapaw; Wish You Were Here – Jules O'Loughlin	**The Sapphires** – **Dany Cooper**; Burning Man – Martin Connor; Wish You Were Here – Jason Ballantine; X: Night of Vengeance – Cindy Clarkson
Best Original Music Score	Best Sound
**Not Suitable for Children** – **Matteo Zingales** and **Jono Ma**; 33 Postcards – Antony Partos; A Few Best Men – Guy Gross; Mental – Michael Yezerski	**The Sapphires** – **Andrew Plain**, **Bry Jones**, **Pete Smith**, **Ben Osmo** and **John Simpson**; Burning Man – David Lee, Andrew Plain and Gethin Creagh; Lore – Sam Petty, Michael Busch, Robert Mackenzie, Antony Gray, Yulia Akerholt and Brooke Trezise; Swerve – Pete Smith, John Simpson, Martyn Zub and Des Kenneally
Best Production Design	Best Costume Design
**The Sapphires** – **Melinda Doring**; Burning Man – Steven Jones-Evans; Killer Elite – Michelle McGahey; Lore – Silke Fischer	**The Sapphires** – **Tess Schofield**; Burning Man – Lizzy Gardiner; Lore – Stefanie Bieker; Mental – Tim Chappel

=== Television ===
Best Drama Series	Best Comedy Series
**Puberty Blues** – **John Edwards** and **Imogen Banks** **(Network Ten)**; Rake (Season 2) – Ian Collie, Peter Duncan and Richard Roxburgh (ABC1); Redfern Now – Darren Dale and Miranda Dear (ABC1); Tangle (Season 3) – John Edwards and Imogen Banks (Showcase)	**Lowdown** (**Season 2**) – Nicole Minchin, **Amanda Brotchie** and **Adam Zwar** **(ABC1)**; A Moody Christmas – Andrew Walker (ABC1); Danger 5 – Kate Croser and Dario Russo (SBS One); Shaun Micallef's Mad as Hell –Peter Beck
Best Telefeature, Mini Series or Short Run Series	Best Children's Television Series
**Howzat! Kerry Packer's War** – **John Edwards** and **Mimi Butler** **(Nine Network)**; Beaconsfield – John Edwards and Jane Liscombe (Nine Network); Devil's Dust – Antonia Barnard and Stephen Corvini (ABC1); Underground: The Julian Assange Story – Helen Bowden (Network Ten)	**The Adventures of Figaro Pho** – **Dan Fill**, **Frank Verheggen** and **David Webster** **(ABC3)**; Dance Academy (Season 2) – Joanna Werner (ABC3); Flea-bitten! – Gillian Carr (Nine Network); Guess How Much I Love You: The Adventures of Little Nutbrown Hare – Suzanne Ryan, Seng Choon Meng, Sebastian Debertin and Tina Sicker (ABC2, Disney Junior)
Best Light Entertainment Series	Best Reality Television Series
**Agony Aunts** – **Adam Zwar** and **Nicole Minchin** **(ABC1)**; Adam Hills in Gordon Street Tonight (Season 2) – Rachel Millar, Adam Hills and Bruce Kane (ABC1); Gruen Sweat – Anita Jacoby, Andrew Denton, Jon Casimir and Debbie Cuell (ABC1); The Hamster Wheel (Series 1) – Andy Nehl (ABC1)	**The Amazing Race Australia** – **David Gardner** and **Matthew Kowald** **(Seven Network)**; MasterChef Australia (Season 4) – Tim Toni (Network Ten); My Kitchen Rules (Season 3) – Matt Apps, Greg Swanborough and Evan Wilkes (Seven Network); The Voice – Julie Ward (Nine Network)
Best Direction	Best Screenplay
**Jeffrey Walker** – **Jack Irish: Bad Debts** **(ABC1)**; Michael McKay – The Amazing Race Australia for "Episode 1" (Seven Network); Glendyn Ivin – Beaconsfield (Nine Network); Daina Reid – Howzat! Kerry Packer's War for Part 1 (Nine Network)	**Redfern Now** – **Steven McGregor** for Episode 6: **"Pretty Boy Blue"** **(ABC1)**; A Moody Christmas – Trent O'Donnell and Phil Lloyd for Episode 5: "Water Under the Bridge" (ABC1); Lowdown – Amanda Brotchie, Adam Zwar and Trudy Hellier for Season 2, Episode 3: "One Fine Gay" (ABC1); Puberty Blues – Alice Bell and Tony McNamara for "Episode 5" (Network Ten)
Best Lead Actor – Drama	Best Lead Actress – Drama
**Richard Roxburgh** – **Rake** (Season 2) as **Cleaver Greene** **(ABC1)**; Jimi Bani – Mabo as Eddie Mabo (ABC1); Anthony Hayes – Devil's Dust as Bernie Banton (ABC1); Lachy Hulme – Howzat! Kerry Packer's War as Kerry Packer (Nine Network)	**Leah Purcell** – **Redfern Now** as **Grace** **(ABC1)**; Ashleigh Cummings – Puberty Blues as Debbie Vickers (Network Ten); Essie Davis – Miss Fisher's Murder Mysteries as Phryne Fisher (ABC1); Susie Porter – Dangerous Remedy as Peggy Berman (ABC1)
Best Guest or Supporting Actor – Drama	Best Guest or Supporting Actress – Drama
**Aaron Jeffery** – **Underbelly: Badness** (**Episode 3: "The Loaded Dog"**) as **Frank "Tink" O'Rourke** **(Nine Network)**; Luke Carroll – Redfern Now (Episode 6: "Pretty Boy Blue") as Lenny (ABC1); Abe Forsythe – Howzat! Kerry Packer's War ("Part One") as John Cornell (Nine Network); Daniel Wyllie – Puberty Blues ("Episode 4") as Roger Knight (Network Ten)	**Mandy McElhinney** – **Howzat! Kerry Packer's War** **("Part Two")** as **Rose Mitchell** **(Nine Network)**; Shareena Clanton – Redfern Now (Episode 1: "Family") as Lilly (ABC1); Susan Prior – Puberty Blues ("Episode 4") as Yvonne Hennessey (Network Ten); Laura Wheelwright – Underground: The Julian Assange Story as Electra (Network Ten)
Best Comedy Performance
**Patrick Brammall** – **A Moody Christmas** as **Sean Moody** **(ABC1)**; Barry Crocker – The Strange Calls as Gregor (ABC2); Damon Herriman – Laid (Series 2) as Marcus Dwyer (ABC1); Frank Woodley – Woodley as himself (ABC1)

=== Documentary ===
Best Feature Length Documentary	Best Documentary Under One Hour
**Storm Surfers 3D — Ellenor Cox and Marcus Gillezeau**; A Common Purpose – Mitzi Goldman; The Curse of the Gothic Symphony – Veronica Fury; Dr Sarmast's Music School — Beth Frey	**Then The Wind Changed** – **Jeni McMahon** and **Celeste Geer (ABC1)**; All The Way – Anne Delaney (ABC1); I Can Change Your Mind About Climate – Simon Nasht and Kate Hodges (ABC1); The Man Who Jumped – Julia Redwood and Ed Punchard (SBS)
Best Documentary Series
**Go Back to Where You Came From — Rick McPhee** and **Ivan O'Mahoney (SBS)**; Once Upon a Time in Cabramatta — Jacob Hickey (SBS); Singapore 1942: End of Empire — Andrew Ogilvie, Trevor Graham and Ned Lander (SBS); Sporting Nation — Andrea Denholm, Lavinia Riachi, John Clarke and Laura Waters (ABC1)
Best Direction in a Documentary	Best Cinematography in a Documentary
**Macario de Souza — Fighting Fear (Foxtel / Movie Network)**; Polly Watkins — Dr. Sarmast's Music School (ABC1); Ivan O'Mahoney and Rick McPhee — Go Back to Where You Came From: "Episode 2" (SBS); Bernadine Lim — Once Upon a Time in Cabramatta: "Episode 2" (SBS)	**Tim Bonython, Chris Bryan, Macario De Souza** and **Lee Kelly — Fighting Fear (Foxtel / Movie Network)**; Peter Zakharov and Stephen Amis — Dr. Sarmast's Music School (ABC1); Stephen Baker and Nicola Daley — Go Back to Where You Came From: "Episode 2" (SBS); David Maguire, Robert Morton, Dean Cropp and Richard Kickbush — Storm Surfers 3D
Best Sound in a Documentary	Best Editing in a Documentary
**Tony Stevens — Dr. Sarmast's Music School (ABC1)**; Christopher Elves, Chris McCallum and David White — Once Upon a Time in Cabramatta: "Episode 2" (SBS); Paul Charlier, Ian McLoughlin, Brooke Trezise, Nick Batterham and Richard Boxhall — Paul Kelly: Stories of Me; Glenn Martin, Ric Curtin, Ash Gibson Greig, Ian Grant, Leo Sullivan and Mark Tarpey — Singapore 1942: End of Empire, "Episode 1" (SBS)	**Sam Wilson — Once Upon a Time in Cabramatta: "Episode 1" (SBS)**; Lawrie Silvestrin — Chateau Chunder: A Wine Revolution (ABC1); Tony Stevens — Dr. Sarmast's Music School (ABC1); Rodrigo Balart — Storm Surfers 3D

=== Short film ===
Best Screenplay in a Short Film	Best Short Animation
**Transmission** **— Zak Hilditch**; B I N O – Billie Pleffer; Dumpy Goes to the Big Smoke – Mirrah Foulkes; Julian — Robert Jago and Matthew Moore	**The Hunter – Marieka Walsh**; Lego Star Wars: The Padawan Menace – David Scott, Mark Thorley and Amber Naismith; The Maker — Christopher Kezelos and Christine Kezelos; Sleight of Hand — Darren Dale
Best Short Fiction Film
**Julian — Robert Jago and Matthew Moore**; B I N O – Billie Pleffer and Rita Walsh; Dumpy Goes to the Big Smoke – Mirrah Foulkes, David Michôd and Michael Cody; Transmission — Zak Hilditch and Liz Kearney

=== Additional awards ===
Best Young Actor	Best Visual Effects
**Saskia Rosendahl** – **Lore**, as **Lore**; Brenna Harding – Puberty Blues as Sue Knight; Ed Oxenbould – Julian as Julian; Lily Sullivan –Mental as Coral Moochmore	**Iron Sky** – **Samuli Torssonen**, **Jussi Lehtiniemi**, **Juuso Kaari** and **Kelly Myers**; Killer Elite – Ineke Majoor and Julian Dimsey; The Sapphires – James Rogers; Utopia Girls: How Women Won The Vote – Kylie Robertson, Rebecca Stegh and Monica Monin (ABC1)
Audience Choice Award for Most Memorable Screen Moment
**The Sapphires**; Howzat! Kerry Packer's War (Nine Network); Puberty Blues (Network Ten); The Voice (Nine Network)

=== Individual awards ===
**The Longford Lyell Award**: **Al Clark**	**The Byron Kennedy Award**: **Sarah Watt**

== Productions with multiple nominations ==
=== Feature film ===
The following feature films received multiple nominations.

- Twelve: The Sapphires
- Ten: Burning Man
- Eight: Lore, Mental and Wish You Were Here
- Four: Not Suitable for Children
- Two: 33 Postcards and Killer Elite

The following feature films received multiple awards.

- Eleven: The Sapphires
- Two: Wish You Were Here

=== Television ===
The following television shows received multiple nominations.

- Six: Puberty Blues
- Five: Howzat! Kerry Packer's War and Redfern Now
- Three: A Moody Christmas
- Two: The Amazing Race Australia, Beaconsfield, Devil's Dust, Lowdown, Rake and Underground: The Julian Assange Story

The following television shows received multiple awards.

- Two: Howzat! Kerry Packer's War and Redfern Now

== See also ==
- 2nd AACTA International Awards
