= AACTA Award for Best Direction =

Australian film and TV awards

AACTA Award Best Direction
- Awarded for: Film direction
- Country: Australia
- Presented by: Australian Academy of Cinema and Television Arts (AACTA)
- First award: 1971
- Currently held by: Danny Philippou & Michael Philippou, Bring Her Back (2025)
- Website: aacta.org

The AACTA Award for Best Direction is an award presented by the Australian Academy of Cinema and Television Arts (AACTA), a non-profit organisation whose aim is to "identify, award, promote and celebrate Australia's greatest achievements in film and television." The award is presented at the annual AACTA Awards, which hand out accolades for achievements in feature film, television, documentaries and short films.

From 1969 to 2010, the category was presented by the Australian Film Institute (AFI), the Academy's parent organisation, at the annual Australian Film Institute Awards (known as the AFI Awards). When the AFI launched the Academy in 2011, it changed the annual ceremony to the AACTA Awards, with the current award being a continuum of the AFI Award for Best Direction.

The record for most wins is three, held by Baz Luhrmann, and ten other directors have won twice. The record for most nominations is seven, held jointly by Paul Cox and Bruce Beresford.

== Winners and nominees ==
In the following table, the years listed correspond to the year of film release; the ceremonies are usually held the same year.^{[A]} The director in bold and in dark blue background have received a special award; those in bold and in yellow background have won a regular competitive award. Those that are neither highlighted nor in bold are the nominees. Within each year, the table lists the winning director first and then the other nominees.

Year	Director(s)	Film
**1970s**
**1971**	**Peter Weir**	**Homesdale**
**1972**	**Tim Burstall**	**Stork**
**1973**	**Eric Porter**	**Marco Polo Junior Versus the Red Dragon**
**1974/5**	**John Power**	**Billy and Percy**
**1976**	**Fred Schepisi**	**The Devil's Playground**
**1976**	Tim Burstall	End Play
**1976**	Bert Deling	Pure S
**1976**	Peter Weir	Picnic at Hanging Rock
**1977**	**Bruce Beresford**	**Don's Party**
**1977**	Chris Löfvén	Oz
**1977**	Philippe Mora	Mad Dog Morgan
**1977**	Henri Safran	Storm Boy
**1978**	**Phillip Noyce**	**Newsfront**
**1978**	John Duigan	Mouth to Mouth
**1978**	Fred Schepisi	The Chant of Jimmie Blacksmith
**1978**	Peter Weir	The Last Wave
**1979**	**Gillian Armstrong**	**My Brilliant Career**
**1979**	Donald Crombie	Cathy's Child
**1979**	George Miller	Mad Max
**1979**	Esben Storm	In Search of Anna
**1980s**
**1980**	**Bruce Beresford**	**Breaker Morant**
**1980**	John Honey	Manganinnie
**1980**	Stephen Wallace	Stir
**1980**	Simon Wincer	Harlequin
**1981**	**Peter Weir**	**Gallipoli**
**1981**	Bruce Beresford	The Club
**1981**	John Duigan	Winter of Our Dreams
**1981**	Claude Whatham	Hoodwink
**1982**	**George Miller**	**Mad Max 2**
**1982**	Paul Cox	Lonely Hearts
**1982**	Michael Pattinson	Moving Out
**1982**	Carl Schultz	Goodbye Paradise
**1983**	**Carl Schultz**	**Careful, He Might Hear You**
**1983**	Paul Cox	Man of Flowers
**1983**	Peter Weir	The Year of Living Dangerously
**1983**	Simon Wincer	Phar Lap
**1984**	**Paul Cox**	**My First Wife**
**1984**	Gil Brealey	Annie's Coming Out
**1984**	Ken Cameron	Fast Talking
**1984**	Sophia Turkiewicz	Silver City
**1985**	**Ray Lawrence**	**Bliss**
**1985**	Bill Bennett	A Street to Die
**1985**	Bob Ellis	Unfinished Business
**1985**	Glenda Hambly	Fran
**1986**	**Nadia Tass**	**Malcolm**
**1986**	Bruce Beresford	The Fringe Dwellers
**1986**	Paul Cox	Cactus
**1986**	George Ogilvie	Short Changed
**1987**	**John Duigan**	**The Year My Voice Broke**
**1987**	Gillian Armstrong	High Tide
**1987**	Bruce Myles and Michael Pattinson	Ground Zero
**1987**	Roger Scholes	The Tale of Ruby Rose
**1988**	**Vincent Ward**	**The Navigator: A Medieval Odyssey**
**1988**	Pino Amenta	Boulevard of Broken Dreams
**1988**	Craig Lahiff	Fever
**1988**	Don McLennan	Mull
**1989**	**Fred Schepisi**	**Evil Angels**
**1989**	Paul Cox	Island
**1989**	Ben Lewin	Georgia
**1989**	Phillip Noyce	Dead Calm
**1990s**
**1990**	**Ray Argall**	**Return Home**
**1990**	Paul Cox	Golden Braid
**1990**	Jerzy Domaradzki	Struck by Lightning
**1990**	Stephen Wallace	Blood Oath
**1991**	**Jocelyn Moorhouse**	**Proof**
**1991**	Rolf de Heer	Dingo
**1991**	Jackie McKimmie	Waiting
**1991**	John Ruane	Death in Brunswick
**1992**	**Baz Luhrmann**	**Strictly Ballroom**
**1992**	Gillian Armstrong	The Last Days of Chez Nous
**1992**	Bruce Beresford	Black Robe
**1992**	Geoffrey Wright	Romper Stomper
**1993**	**Jane Campion**	**The Piano**
**1993**	Michael Jenkins	The Heartbreak Kid
**1993**	James Ricketson	Blackfellas
**1993**	Vincent Ward	Map of the Human Heart
**1994**	**Rolf de Heer**	**Bad Boy Bubby**
**1994**	Stephan Elliott	The Adventures of Priscilla, Queen of the Desert
**1994**	P. J. Hogan	Muriel's Wedding
**1994**	Alkinos Tsilimidos	Everynight ... Everynight
**1995**	**Michael Rymer**	**Angel Baby**
**1995**	Richard Franklin	Hotel Sorrento
**1995**	Margot Nash	Vacant Possession
**1995**	John Ruane	That Eye, the Sky
**1996**	**Scott Hicks**	**Shine**
**1996**	Paul Cox	Lust and Revenge
**1996**	Peter Duncan	Children of the Revolution
**1996**	Clara Law	Floating Life
**1997**	**Bill Bennett**	**Kiss or Kill**
**1997**	David Caesar	Idiot Box
**1997**	Chris Kennedy	Doing Time for Patsy Cline
**1997**	Samantha Lang	The Well
**1998**	**Rowan Woods**	**The Boys**
**1998**	Ana Kokkinos	Head On
**1998**	Craig Monahan	The Interview
**1998**	Rachel Perkins	Radiance
**1999**	**Gregor Jordan**	**Two Hands**
**1999**	Christina Andreef	Soft Fruit
**1999**	Bill Bennett	In a Savage Land
**1999**	John Curran	Praise
**2000s**
**2000**	**Andrew Dominik**	**Chopper**
**2000**	Pip Karmel	Me Myself I
**2000**	Jonathan Teplitzky	Better Than Sex
**2000**	Kate Woods	Looking for Alibrandi
**2001**	**Ray Lawrence**	**Lantana**
**2001**	David Caesar	Mullet
**2001**	Robert Connolly	The Bank
**2001**	Baz Luhrmann	Moulin Rouge!
**2002**	**Ivan Sen**	**Beneath Clouds**
**2002**	Tony Ayres	Walking on Water
**2002**	Rolf de Heer	The Tracker
**2002**	Phillip Noyce	Rabbit-Proof Fence
**2003**	**Sue Brooks**	**Japanese Story**
**2003**	Gregor Jordan	Ned Kelly
**2003**	Paul Moloney	Crackerjack
**2003**	Jonathan Teplitzky	Gettin' Square
**2004**	**Cate Shortland**	**Somersault**
**2004**	Khoa Do	The Finished People
**2004**	Jan Sardi	Love's Brother
**2004**	Alkinos Tsilimidos	Tom White
**2005**	**Sarah Watt**	**Look Both Ways**
**2005**	John Hillcoat	The Proposition
**2005**	Greg McLean	Wolf Creek
**2005**	Rowan Woods	Little Fish
**2006**	**Peter Djigirr and Rolf de Heer**	**Ten Canoes**
**2006**	Paul Goldman	Suburban Mayhem
**2006**	Clayton Jacobson	Kenny
**2006**	Ray Lawrence	Jindabyne
**2007**	**Tony Ayres**	**The Home Song Stories**
**2007**	Cherie Nowlan	Clubland
**2007**	Richard Roxburgh	Romulus, My Father
**2007**	Matthew Saville	Noise
**2008**	**Elissa Down**	**The Black Balloon**
**2008**	Peter Duncan	Unfinished Sky
**2008**	Nash Edgerton	The Square
**2008**	Dee McLachlan	The Jammed
**2009**	**Warwick Thornton**	**Samson and Delilah**
**2009**	Bruce Beresford	Mao's Last Dancer
**2009**	Robert Connolly	Balibo
**2009**	Rachel Ward	Beautiful Kate
**2010s**
**2010**	**David Michôd**	**Animal Kingdom**
**2010**	Julie Bertuccelli	The Tree
**2010**	Jane Campion	Bright Star
**2010**	Jeremy Sims	Beneath Hill 60
**AACTA Awards**
**2011** (1st)	**Justin Kurzel**	**Snowtown**
**2011** (1st)	Daniel Nettheim	The Hunter
**2011** (1st)	Fred Schepisi	The Eye of the Storm
**2011** (1st)	Kriv Stenders	Red Dog
**2012** (2nd)	**Wayne Blair**	**The Sapphires**
**2012** (2nd)	Kieran Darcy-Smith	Wish You Were Here
**2012** (2nd)	Cate Shortland	Lore
**2012** (2nd)	Jonathan Teplitzky	Burning Man
**2013** (3rd)	**Baz Luhrmann**	**The Great Gatsby**
**2013** (3rd)	Kim Mordaunt	The Rocket
**2013** (3rd)	Ivan Sen	Mystery Road
**2013** (3rd)	The Turning Ensemble^{[B]}	The Turning
**2014** (4th)	**Jennifer Kent**	**The Babadook**
**2014** (4th)	Rolf de Heer	Charlie's Country
**2014** (4th)	David Michôd	The Rover
**2014** (4th)	The Spierig Brothers	Predestination
**2015** (5th)	**George Miller**	**Mad Max: Fury Road**
**2015** (5th)	Neil Armfield	Holding the Man
**2015** (5th)	Jocelyn Moorhouse	The Dressmaker
**2015** (5th)	Jeremy Sims	Last Cab to Darwin
**2016** (6th)	**Mel Gibson**	**Hacksaw Ridge**
**2016** (6th)	Martin Butler and Bentley Dean	Tanna
**2016** (6th)	Rosemary Myers	Girl Asleep
**2016** (6th)	Ivan Sen	Goldstone
**2017** (7th)	**Garth Davis**	**Lion**
**2017** (7th)	Cate Shortland	Berlin Syndrome
**2017** (7th)	Jeffrey Walker	Ali's Wedding
**2017** (7th)	Ben Young	Hounds of Love
**2018** (8th)	**Warwick Thornton**	**Sweet Country**
**2018** (8th)	Simon Baker	Breath
**2018** (8th)	Bruce Beresford	Ladies in Black
**2018** (8th)	Joel Edgerton	Boy Erased
**2019** (9th)	**Jennifer Kent**	**The Nightingale**
**2019** (9th)	Mirrah Foulkes	Judy and Punch
**2019** (9th)	Anthony Maras	Hotel Mumbai
**2019** (9th)	David Michôd	The King
**2020s**
**2020** (10th)	**Shannon Murphy**	**Babyteeth**
**2020** (10th)	Natalie Erika James	Relic
**2020** (10th)	Justin Kurzel	True History of the Kelly Gang
**2020** (10th)	John Sheedy	H Is for Happiness
**2020** (10th)	Leigh Whannell	The Invisible Man
**2021** (11th)	**Justin Kurzel**	**Nitram**
**2021** (11th)	Robert Connolly	The Dry
**2021** (11th)	Glendyn Ivin	Penguin Bloom
**2021** (11th)	Stephen Maxwell Johnson	High Ground
**2021** (11th)	Roderick MacKay	The Furnace
**2022** (12th)	**Baz Luhrmann**	**Elvis**
**2022** (12th)	Hannah Barlow and Kane Senes	Sissy
**2022** (12th)	George Miller	Three Thousand Years of Longing
**2022** (12th)	Leah Purcell	The Drover's Wife: The Legend of Molly Johnson
**2022** (12th)	Thomas M. Wright	The Stranger
**2023** (13th)	**Danny Philippou and Michael Philippou**	**Talk to Me**
**2023** (13th)	Jub Clerc	Sweet As
**2023** (13th)	Noora Niasari	Shayda
**2023** (13th)	Goran Stolevski	Of an Age
**2023** (13th)	Warwick Thornton	The New Boy
**2024** (14th)	**Michael Gracey**	**Better Man**
**2024** (14th)	Colin Cairnes and Cameron Cairnes	Late Night with the Devil
**2024** (14th)	Adam Elliot	Memoir of a Snail
**2024** (14th)	George Miller	Furiosa: A Mad Max Saga
**2024** (14th)	Nick Waterman	How to Make Gravy
**2025** (15th)	**Danny and Michael Philippou**	**Bring Her Back**
**2025** (15th)	Kate Woods	Kangaroo
**2025** (15th)	Emma Hough Hobbs, Leela Varghese	Lesbian Space Princess
**2025** (15th)	Kriv Stenders	The Correspondent
**2025** (15th)	Bruce Beresford	The Travellers

== Notes ==
A: From 1958-2010, the awards were held during the year of the films release. However, the 1974-75 awards were held in 1975 for films released in 1974 and 1975, and the first AACTA Awards were held in 2012 for films released in 2011.
B: The Turning Ensemble consists of the seventeen people who directed their individual segments in the film. They are: Jonathan auf der Heide, Tony Ayres, Simon Stone, Jub Clerc, Robert Connolly, Shaun Gladwell, Rhys Graham, Justin Kurzel, Yaron Lifschitz, Anthony Lucas, Claire McCarthy, Ian Meadows, Ashlee Page, Stephen Page, Warwick Thornton, Marieka Walsh, Mia Wasikowska and David Wenham.
