= AACTA Award for Best Original Screenplay =

Australian film award

Best Original Screenplay AACTA Award
- Country: Australia
- Presented by: Australian Academy of Cinema and Television Arts (AACTA)
- First award: 1978
- Currently held by: Shaun Grant, Nitram (2021)
- Website: www.aacta.org

The AACTA Award for Best Original Screenplay is an award presented by the Australian Academy of Cinema and Television Arts (AACTA), for an Australian screenplay "written directly and originally for the screen". Prior to the establishment of the Academy in 2011, the award was presented by the Australian Film Institute (AFI) at the annual Australian Film Institute Awards (more commonly known as the AFI Awards). It was first handed out in 1978 when the award for Best Screenplay (which was first presented at the 1974-75 awards) was split into two categories: Best Original Screenplay and Best Adapted Screenplay. The award has since been presented intermittently from 1978-1979, 1983-1987, 1989, 1993-2006, and then from 2008-present.

== Winners and nominees ==
In the following table, the years listed correspond to the year of film release; the ceremonies are usually held the same year. The films and screenwriters in bold and in yellow background have won are the winners. Those that are neither highlighted nor in bold are the nominees. When sorted chronologically, the table always lists the winning screenplay first and then the other nominees.

Year	Film	Screenwriter(s)
**1970s**
**1978**	**Newsfront**	**Bob Ellis and Phillip Noyce**
**1978**	The Last Wave	Tony Morphett, Petru Popescu and Peter Weir
**1978**	Mouth to Mouth	John Duigan
**1978**	Patrick	Everett De Roche
**1979**	**In Search of Anna**	**Esben Storm**
**1979**	Kostas	Linda Aronson
**1979**	Mad Max	James McCausland and George Miller
**1979**	Palm Beach	Albie Thoms
**1980s**
**1983**	**Buddies**	**John Dingwall**
**1983**	The Clinic	Greg Millin
**1983**	Man of Flowers	Paul Cox and Bob Ellis
**1983**	Phar Lap	David Williamson
**1984**	**My First Wife**	**Paul Cox and Bob Ellis**
**1984**	Fast Talking	Ken Cameron
**1984**	Silver City	Thomas Keneally and Sophia Turkiewicz
**1984**	Street Hero	Jan Sardi
**1985**	**Fran**	**Glenda Hambly**
**1985**	The Boy Who Had Everything	Stephen Wallace
**1985**	A Street to Die	Bill Bennett
**1985**	Unfinished Business	Bob Ellis
**1986**	**Malcolm**	**David Parker**
**1986**	The More Things Change...	Michael Brindley and Moya Wood
**1986**	Short Changed	Bob Merritt
**1986**	Young Einstein	David Roach and Yahoo Serious
**1987**	**The Year My Voice Broke**	**John Duigan**
**1987**	Belinda	Pamela Gibbons
**1987**	Ground Zero	Mac Gudgeon and Jan Sardi
**1987**	High Tide	Laura Jones
**1989**	**Sweetie**	**Jane Campion and Gerard Lee**
**1989**	Georgia	Mac Gudgeon
**1989**	Ghosts... of the Civil Dead	Gene Conkie, Evan English and John Hillcoat
**1989**	Island	Paul Cox
**1990s**
**1993**	**The Piano**	**Jane Campion**
**1993**	The Nostradamus Kid	Bob Ellis
**1993**	On My Own	Gill Dennis, John Frizzell and Antonio Tibaldi
**1993**	This Won't Hurt a Bit	Chris Kennedy
**1994**	**Bad Boy Bubby**	**Rolf de Heer**
**1994**	The Adventures of Priscilla, Queen of the Desert	Stephan Elliott
**1994**	Muriel's Wedding	P. J. Hogan
**1994**	The Roly Poly Man	Kym Goldsworthy
**1995**	**Angel Baby**	**Michael Rymer**
**1995**	All Men Are Liars	Gerard Lee
**1995**	Mushrooms	Alan Madden
**1995**	Vacant Possession	Margot Nash
**1996**	**Shine**	**Jan Sardi**
**1996**	Children of the Revolution	Peter Duncan
**1996**	Floating Life	Eddie L. C. Fong and Clara Law
**1996**	Love and Other Catastrophes	Helen Bandis, Yael Bergman and Emma-Kate Croghan
**1997**	**The Castle**	**Santo Cilauro, Tom Gleisner, Jane Kennedy and Rob Sitch**
**1997**	Doing Time for Patsy Cline	Chris Kennedy
**1997**	Kiss or Kill	Bill Bennett
**1997**	Road to Nhill	Alison Tilson
**1998**	**The Interview**	**Gordon Davie and Craig Monahan**
**1998**	Amy	David Parker
**1998**	Dance Me to My Song	Rolf de Heer, Heather Rose and Frederick Stahl
**1998**	Dead Letter Office	Deb Cox
**1999**	**Two Hands**	**Gregor Jordan**
**1999**	Siam Sunset	Max Dann and Andrew Knight
**1999**	Soft Fruit	Christina Andreef
**1999**	Strange Fits of Passion	Elise McCredie
**2000s**
**2000**	**Russian Doll**	**Stavros Kazantzidis and Allanah Zitserman**
**2000**	Better Than Sex	Jonathan Teplitzky
**2000**	Me Myself I	Pip Karmel
**2000**	My Mother Frank	Mark Lamprell
**2001**	**The Bank**	**Robert Connolly**
**2001**	La Spagnola	Anna Maria Monticelli
**2001**	Mullet	David Caesar
**2001**	Yolngu Boy	Chris Anastassiades
**2002**	**Walking on Water**	**Roger Monk**
**2002**	Beneath Clouds	Ivan Sen
**2002**	The Man Who Sued God	John Clarke and Don Watson
**2002**	The Tracker	Rolf de Heer
**2003**	**Japanese Story**	**Alison Tilson**
**2003**	Crackerjack	Mick and Richard Molloy
**2003**	Gettin' Square	Chris Nyst
**2003**	Travelling Night	Kathryn Millard
**2004**	**Somersault**	**Cate Shortland**
**2004**	The Finished People	Khoa Do, Rodney Anderson, Joe Le and Jason McGoldrick
**2004**	Love's Brother	Jan Sardi
**2004**	Tom White	Daniel Keene
**2005**	**Look Both Ways**	**Sarah Watt**
**2005**	Little Fish	Jacquelin Perske
**2005**	The Proposition	Nick Cave
**2005**	Wolf Creek	Greg McLean
**2006**	**Ten Canoes**	**Rolf de Heer**
**2006**	2:37	Murali K. Thalluri
**2006**	Kenny	Shane and Clayton Jacobson
**2006**	Suburban Mayhem	Alice Bell
**2008**	**The Black Balloon**	**Elissa Down and Jimmy Jack**
**2008**	Hey, Hey, It's Esther Blueburger	Cathy Randall
**2008**	The Jammed	Dee McLachlan
**2008**	The Square	Matthew Dabner and Joel Edgerton
**2009**	**Samson and Delilah**	**Warwick Thornton**
**2009**	Cedar Boys	Serhat Caradee
**2009**	Mary and Max	Adam Elliot
**2009**	My Year Without Sex	Sarah Watt
**2010s**
**2010**	**Animal Kingdom**	**David Michôd**
**2010**	Beneath Hill 60	David Roach
**2010**	Bright Star	Jane Campion
**2010**	Daybreakers	The Spierig Brothers
**AACTA Awards**
**2011** (1st)	**Griff the Invisible**	**Leon Ford**
**2011** (1st)	The Loved Ones	Sean Byrne
**2011** (1st)	Mad Bastards	Brendan Fletcher
**2011** (1st)	Red Hill	Patrick Hughes
**2012** (2nd)	**Wish You Were Here**	**Kieran Darcy-Smith and Felicity Price**
**2012** (2nd)	Burning Man	Jonathan Teplitzky
**2012** (2nd)	Mental	P. J. Hogan
**2012** (2nd)	Not Suitable for Children	Michael Lucas
**2013** (3rd)	**The Rocket**	**Kim Mordaunt**
**2013** (3rd)	100 Bloody Acres	Colin and Cameron Cairnes
**2013** (3rd)	Drift	Morgan O'Neill
**2013** (3rd)	Mystery Road	Ivan Sen
**2014** (4th)	**The Babadook**	**Jennifer Kent**
**2014** (4th)	52 Tuesdays	Matthew Cormack and Sophie Hyde
**2014** (4th)	Charlie's Country	David Gulpilil and Rolf de Heer
**2014** (4th)	The Water Diviner	Andrew Anastasios and Andrew Knight
**2015** (5th)	**Paper Planes**	**Robert Connolly and Steve Worland**
**2015** (5th)	Cut Snake	Blake Ayshford
**2015** (5th)	Kill Me Three Times	James McFarland
**2015** (5th)	Mad Max: Fury Road	Nico Lathouris, Brendan McCarthy and George Miller
**2016** (6th)	**Hacksaw Ridge**	**Andrew Knight and Robert Schenkkan**
**2016** (6th)	Down Under	Abe Forsythe
**2016** (6th)	Goldstone	Ivan Sen
**2016** (6th)	Pawno	Damian Hill
**2017** (7th)	**Ali's Wedding**	**Andrew Knight and Osamah Sami**
**2017** (7th)	The Butterfly Tree	Priscilla Cameron
**2017** (7th)	The Death and Life of Otto Bloom	Cris Jones
**2017** (7th)	Hounds of Love	Ben Young
**2018** (8th)
**2018** (8th)	**Sweet Country**	**Steven McGregor and David Tranter**
**2018** (8th)	1%	Matt Nable
**2018** (8th)	Brothers' Nest	Jaime Browne
**2018** (8th)	Upgrade	Leigh Whannell
**2020s**
**2021** (11th)
**2021** (11th)	**Nitram**	**Shaun Grant**
**2021** (11th)	Ellie & Abbie (& Ellie's Dead Aunt)	Monica Zanetti
**2021** (11th)	The Furnace	Roderick MacKay
**2021** (11th)	High Ground	Chris Anastassiades
**2021** (11th)	June Again	JJ Winlove

== See also ==
- AACTA Award for Best Adapted Screenplay
- AACTA Award for Best Screenplay, Original or Adapted
- AACTA Award for Best Screenplay in a Short Film
- Australian Film Institute Award for Best Screenplay
- AACTA Awards
