= Kathryn Beck =

Australian actress

- Born: 1 March 1986 (age 40); Wellington Point, Brisbane, Queensland
- Occupation: Actress
- Years active: 2005–present
- Children: 1

Kathryn Beck (born 1 March 1986) is an Australian television and theatre actress. In 2007, she played Lily Nelson in the soap opera Home and Away and the following year, she appeared in East of Everything. In 2013, Beck began appearing in Neighbours as Gemma Reeves. She joined the cast of Wentworth in 2014.

== Biography ==
She was born in Brisbane, Queensland, and raised in Wellington Point, a suburb of Redland City. She attended Alexandra Hills State High School, and studied drama at Queensland University of Technology. She appeared in an advertising campaign for KFC's "Twister", before moving to Sydney and landing the role in Home and Away. In 2008, she played Lizzy Dellora in the ABC1 drama series East of Everything. In 2010 she was cast in the lead role of the successful feature-length film The Little Things directed by Nell McGregor.

She has performed in theatre work for the Griffin Theatre Company, including King Tide by Katherine Thomson in 2007. Beck joined the cast of Neighbours as Gemma Reeves in 2013. She began appearing in the second season of prison drama Wentworth in 2014. Beck plays a doctor in the comedy film Cooped Up.

== Personal life ==
Beck is married and has one child, a daughter. In November 2018, Beck was forced to leave her house in Malibu due to the Woolsey Fire.

== Filmography ==
=== Film ===
Year	Title	Role	Notes
2005	Mosaic	Young Candice	
2009	Subdivision	Dale Kelly	
2010	The Little Things	Dee O'Keefe	
2011	Burning Man	Marti	
2012	Not Suitable for Children	Becky Kincaid	
2012	The Adventures of Scooter the Penguin	Darling Starling Shawntelle	Direct-to-video film; voice role
2013	These Final Hours	Vicki	
2013	Aim High on Creation	Kathryn Beck	
2014	Locks of Love	Sally	Segment: "CapItal L"
2015	Super Awesome!	Guy Edmonds & Matt Zeremes	
2016	Madly	Woman	Segment: "Afterbirth"

=== Television ===
Year	Title	Role	Notes
2007	Home and Away	Lily Nelson	4 episodes (season 20)
2007	Chandon Pictures	Sherbert	Episode: "Cousins"
2008–09	East of Everything	Lizzy Dellora	Main role, 13 episodes
2008	Scorched	Emily Francia	Nine Network television film
2009	All Saints	Marina Reade	Episode: "On Second Thoughts..."
2012	Puberty Blues	Ginny	Episode 1.4
2013	Camp	Veronique	Episode: "CIT Overnight"
2013	Power Games: The Packer-Murdoch War	Anoushka	Miniseries, 2 episodes
2013–14	Neighbours	Gemma Reeves	Recurring role (seasons 29–30), 16 episodes
2014	Wentworth	Sky Pierson	Recurring role (season 2), 12 episodes
2016	Cooped Up	Emily	Television film

=== Short works ===
- 2005: Passive Smoker as Beth
- 2009: Benefit as Karina
- 2010: The Improbable Existence of Lily Bell as Lily
- 2010: Falling Fowl as Stephine Fowl
- 2011: Collision as Mia
- 2012: Love Untitled
- 2013: Kite as Sara
- 2013: First Date
- 2014: Twisted The Girl
- 2014: Flat Daddy Erica
- 2015: These Final Hours as Vicky
- 2015: Batman and Jimbo as Kath
- 2015: The Gap as Theresa
