= Mental (2012 film) =

2012 film by P. J. Hogan

- Theatrical release poster
- Directed by: P. J. Hogan
- Written by: P. J. Hogan
- Produced by: Janet Zucker; Jerry Zucker; Todd Fellman; Jocelyn Moorhouse
- Starring: Toni Collette; Anthony LaPaglia; Liev Schreiber; Rebecca Gibney
- Cinematography: Donald McAlpine
- Edited by: Jill Bilcock
- Music by: Michael Yezerski
- Production companies: Screen Australia; Screen Queensland; Screen NSW; Zucker Productions; Story Bridge Films
- Distributed by: Dada Films (United States); Universal Pictures (Australia)
- Release dates: 18 August 2012 (MIFF); 4 October 2012 (Australia); 29 March 2013 (United States)
- Running time: 116 minutes
- Countries: Australia; United States
- Language: English
- Box office: $4.4 million

Mental is a 2012 comedy-drama film written and directed by P. J. Hogan. The film stars Toni Collette, Anthony LaPaglia, Liev Schreiber, and Rebecca Gibney. It follows a hitchhiker transforming a family's life when she becomes the nanny of five teenage girls whose mother has cracked from her husband's political ambitions and his infidelity.

Mental premiered as the closing film at the 61st Melbourne International Film Festival on 18 August 2012 and was theatrically released in Australia on 4 October 2012. It earned eight nominations at the 2nd AACTA Awards.

== Plot ==
Shirley Moochmoore is a sweet misfit and mother of five daughters who are all convinced they suffer from various mental illnesses. Living in the Australian coastal suburb of Dolphin Heads and married to the often absent local politician Barry, Shirley retreats into a fantasy world of her favourite musical, The Sound of Music. After she manically orders a huge amount of furniture, telling neighbours her husband won it on a TV game show, she's sent to a mental institution. Barry, in his embarrassment, instructs his daughters to say she's "on holiday in Wollongong".

Barry enlists a mysterious, surly hitchhiker named Shaz to care for his family. Shaz terrifies the girls into obedience with her ocker accent, her dog Ripper and the knife she keeps in her cowboy boot, but she also encourages them to stand up to local bullies including their smarmy Aunt Doris, their snobbish, house-proud neighbour Nancy and the two mean girls who run the local coffee shop, who always forced Shirley to eat unwanted donuts. Shaz's philosophy is that the 'normal' world is insane, and so-called 'crazy' people are the normal ones. She leads the Moochmore girls on a dawn climb of a nearby mountain. From its peak, they each select a stone to symbolise their newfound ability to overcome adversity.

Shaz also encourages their eldest daughter Coral to pursue a romance with Trout, a hunky, guitar-strumming lifeguard at the aquatic theme park where Coral works for an eccentric shark hunter named Trevor Blundell. Trevor had earlier disrupted Trout clumsily kissing Coral in the shark exhibit; but thanks to the confidence Shaz instills in Coral, Trout genuinely falls for her, and the pair spend a romantic evening together riding waterslides in the nude after the park has closed.

After forcing Barry to eat a home-cooked meal with his family, and to seek treatment for his daughter Michelle's genuine schizophrenia, Shaz reunites the Moochmore family at the mental institution. Shirley tells Barry that she knows of his habitual infidelities and will no longer support his political career. Barry begs her to appear at his campaign launch.

Trevor reveals that Shaz is actually his mentally disturbed ex-wife. He tells Coral that Shaz is convinced the spirit of their daughter, who died in a boating accident, is trapped inside the giant preserved shark in Trevor's exhibit. Trevor is trying to move on with his life, but Shaz has repeatedly refused psychiatric treatment and instead has followed Trevor to several new towns, working her way into the trust of locals each time. Barry calls the police to have Shaz arrested, and she is confined to the same mental institution Shirley had been.

The girls decide to break Shaz out of the mental institution. They tie up Trevor and help Shaz steal his pickled shark. Tortured by the gentle guitar songs of his guard, Trout, Trevor manages to escape just in time to intercept and reason with Shaz as she attempts to free the shark from its tank and 'release' it into the ocean. The shark tank plunges into the water, its attached rope entangling Trevor's legs, and Shaz dives after it, ostensibly to save him. Neither of them surfaces.

The Moochmore family perform a triumphant, Von Trapp-style onstage singalong of "Edelweiss" at Barry's campaign launch. The girls' aunt Doris, whose hobby is making elaborate costumes for porcelain dolls, has a final confrontation with Shaz in her doll display room. "I lived!" Shaz screams, then pulls down her jeans and lights a fart with her cigarette lighter, setting fire to the room and the entire house. Then she races out the front door, kicking over a garbage bin, which has left her able to win in triumph.

== Cast ==
- Toni Collette as Sharon "Shaz" Thornbender
- Anthony LaPaglia as Barry Moochmore
- Rebecca Gibney as Shirley Moochmore
- Lily Sullivan as Coral Moochmore
- Bethany Whitmore as Jane Moochmore
- Malorie O'Neill as Michelle Moochmore
- Chelsea Bennett as Kayleen Moochmore
- Nicole Freeman as Leanne Moochmore
- Liev Schreiber as Trevor Blundell
- Caroline Goodall as Doris
- Kerry Fox as Nancy
- Deborah Mailman as Sandra
- Sam Clark as Trout
- Sophie Lee as Jean
- Rob Carlton as Jack

== Production ==
Director P. J. Hogan based the script on his own mother's mental breakdown when he was 12, and his politician father's refusal to tell anyone about his wife's illness in case it hurt his electoral chances. As in the film, Hogan's father recruited a hitchhiker to babysit the family.

"I came home from school and there was this strange woman rolling a cigarette, knife in her boot, dog beside her, and she said, 'Bit of a mess in here, innit?'" Hogan recalled. "That was the woman who took care of us … she pretty much lived with us, I remember, for six to eight months, even after my mum returned home, because they got on."

When shooting Muriel's Wedding, Hogan and his producer wife Jocelyn Moorhouse would entertain Toni Collette with stories about the real 'Shaz'. "Toni just said, 'You've got to make a film about this woman, and if you do, I'm playing her.'" Hogan's sister also has schizophrenia, and told him, "You should put me in a movie. I want people to know what it's like."

Mental was filmed on location in Banora Point, Ballina, Evans Head and Tweed Heads, New South Wales, and Coolangatta and the Gold Coast, Queensland.

== Reception ==
Mental attracted mixed reviews. As of June 2020, it holds a 44% approval rating on Rotten Tomatoes, based on 55 reviews with an average score of 5.53/10. The site's consensus reads: "Mental is a well-acted black comedy that suffers from jarring tonal shifts and a lack of comic discipline".

On ABC TV's At the Movies, critics Margaret Pomeranz and David Stratton disagreed about the film. Pomeranz gave it four out of five stars, saying director PJ Hogan "walks a fine line between the grotesque and the compassionate and for me, he succeeds, painfully but gracefully." But Stratton gave it two and a half stars: "For me it didn't work on almost every level."

Leigh Paatsch, writing in the Herald Sun, called it a "true cinematic lemon" in a withering review. "Having paid $18 to see Mental last week, all I can say is this: I want my $100 back."

In The Age, Craig Mathieson was more cautiously positive, noting the film's "brash, consumptive energy that turns on everything from diagnosing mental illness and race relations to shark imagery and teenage affirmation. It is not a movie that holds back."

Crikey reviewer Luke Buckmaster felt Hogan "can't decide whether he's directing an indie or a multiplexer. That's partly why Mental is so strongly unique, so difficult to contextualise, so easy to herald as a triumph of ballsy suburban dramedy or an ambitious dud." But Buckmaster gave it a favourable review: "It is a bare-all everything-in-the-open film, and the way it encourages discussion of important issues without appearing didactic or preachy is admirable."

Canberra Times reviewer Phillippa Hawker wrote, "Collette's performance anchors the film: it has a fierce, uncompromising quality that gives strength to the film's two interwoven tendencies - in-your-face comedy and emotional distress."

=== Awards and nominations ===
| Award | Category | Subject | Result |
|---|---|---|---|
| AACTA Award (2nd) | Best Original Screenplay | P. J. Hogan | Nominated |
| AACTA Award (2nd) | Best Actress | Toni Collette | Nominated |
| AACTA Award (2nd) | Best Supporting Actor | Liev Schreiber | Nominated |
| AACTA Award (2nd) | Best Supporting Actress | Rebecca Gibney | Nominated |
| AACTA Award (2nd) | Best Supporting Actress | Deborah Mailman | Nominated |
| AACTA Award (2nd) | Best Original Music Score | Michael Yezerski | Nominated |
| AACTA Award (2nd) | Best Young Actor | Lily Sullivan | Nominated |
| AACTA Award (2nd) | Best Costume Design | Tim Chappel | Nominated |
| ASE Award | Best Editing in a Feature Film | Jill Bilcock | Nominated |
| AFCA Awards | Best Actress | Toni Collette | Nominated |
| AFCA Awards | Best Supporting Actor | Liev Schreiber | Nominated |
| AFCA Awards | Best Supporting Actress | Rebecca Gibney | Nominated |
| AFCA Awards | Best Supporting Actress | Deborah Mailman | Nominated |
| AFCA Awards | Best Production Design | Graham 'Grace' Walker | Nominated |
| FCCA Awards | Best Supporting Actor | Liev Schreiber | Nominated |
| FCCA Awards | Best Supporting Actress | Rebecca Gibney | Won |
| FCCA Awards | Best Young Actor | Lily Sullivan | Nominated |

== See also ==
- Cinema of Australia
- Mental illness in film
