= Cleo Massey =

Australian actress (born 1993)

- Born: 19 November 1993 (age 32); Launceston, Tasmania, Australia
- Occupation: Actress
- Years active: 2004–present
- Spouse: Luke Dempsey-Ceh (m. 2021)
- Children: 1

Cleo Massey (born 19 November 1993) is an Australian actress. She is best known for her portrayal of Kim Sertori in the television series H2O: Just Add Water. Massey has been performing on TV and film since the age of 11. In 2010, she was cast in the feature-length film The Little Things directed by Neil McGregor. In 2015, Massey began a blog called Pass Around the Smile, based around living a positive life. Pass Around the Smile has since expanded into events, courses, online meditations and Positive Guidance cards.

== Early life ==
Massey was born in Launceston, Tasmania. Her mother, Anna Waters-Massey, is an actress and acting teacher. Massey attended her classes while growing up. She has a younger brother, Joey.

== Personal life ==
Massey got married in December, 2021, to Luke Dempsey-Ceh, her partner of ten years. She announced her pregnancy in September 2023 via Instagram. In March, 2024, she gave birth to her daughter, Indigo Valerie Dempsey.

== Filmography ==
=== Feature film ===
- The Little Things (2010) – Young Dee
- Beat (2022) – Annie

=== Television ===
- Mortified (2006) – Brittany's Cheer Squad
- Monarch Cove (2006) – Drowning Girl
- H2O: Just Add Water (2006–2010) – Kim Sertori
- The Bureau of Magical Things (2018) – Sophie
- Apple Cider Vinegar (2025) - Kim
- Stage Mums (2018) - Shenaya Dicker

=== Short films ===
- Futility (2010) – Jade McIntyre
- Humidity Rising (2006) – Chrissy
