= The Forbidden Aunt =

2026 Serbian documentary film

- Promotional poster
- Serbian: Zabranjena tetka
- Directed by: Bojana Novaković
- Screenplay by: Bojana Novaković
- Produced by: Sonja Bozic; Marija Stojanović; Milan Stojanović
- Starring: Gordana; Bojana Novaković
- Cinematography: Bojana Novaković
- Edited by: Sonja Bozic; Dragan von Petrovic
- Music by: Janja Loncar; Vasil Hadzimanov
- Production company: Sense Production
- Release date: 19 August 2026 (Sarajevo)
- Running time: 82 minute
- Countries: Serbia; Australia
- Languages: Serbian; English
- Budget: €202,000

The Forbidden Aunt (Serbian: Zabranjena tetka) is a 2026 Serbian documentary film written, and directed by Bojana Novaković.

It had its world premiere at the 32nd Sarajevo Film Festival on 19 August 2026, screening in the Competition Programme – Documentary Film 2026, and competing for the Heart of Sarajevo award.

== Summary ==
A Serbian family proves that real life can be stranger, darker, and more gripping than any TV drama. After a painful breakup, Serbian-Australian actor and filmmaker Bojana Novaković leaves Hollywood and travels to rural Serbia, hoping to find calm by reconnecting with her quirky, long-lost Aunt Gordana. But instead of peace, Bojana is pulled into a storm of family secrets that forces her to face the hidden pain carried by four generations of women in her family.

== Production ==
The film was shot in February 2017 on location in Serbia, United States and Australia and was expected to be finished by May 2018.

== Release ==
The Forbidden Aunt had its World Premiere at the 32nd Sarajevo Film Festival, where it competed for Heart of Sarajevo award in the Competition Programme – Documentary Film 2026 on 19 August 2026. Subsequently it will be screened in the Adelaide Film Festival on 18 October 2026.

== Accolades ==
Award	Date of ceremony	Category	Recipient	Result	Ref.
Sarajevo Film Festival	21 August 2026	Heart of Sarajevo Award for Best Documentary Film	The Forbidden Aunt	Nominated	
