= Gemma Reeves =

Fictional character from the Australian soap opera Neighbours

- Neighbours character
- Portrayed by: Kathryn Beck
- Duration: 2013–2014
- First appearance: 7 October 2013
- Last appearance: 10 January 2014
- Introduced by: Richard Jasek
In-universe information
- Other names: Ursula Abel
- Occupation: Biology teacher
- Father: Barry Reeves
- Mother: Coral Reeves
- Brothers: Tad Reeves (adoptive)
- Aunts: Angie Rebecchi
- First cousins: Toadie Rebecchi; Georgia Brooks
- Other relatives: Callum Jones; Nell Rebecchi

Gemma "Gem" Reeves is a fictional character from the Australian soap opera Neighbours, played by Kathryn Beck. The actress's casting was first announced in September 2013, while a promotional trailer for the character was also released. Beck commented that she loved playing Gem because she pushed boundaries. The character made her first screen appearance during the episode broadcast on 7 October 2013. She departed on 10 January 2014, with series producer Jason Herbison commenting that she could return in the future.

Gem was introduced as the cousin of established characters Georgia Brooks (Saskia Hampele) and Toadfish Rebecchi (Ryan Moloney). She was portrayed as "a schemer", "cunning", manipulative and having "a nasty streak". Using her position as a biology teacher, Gem sabotaged some of her students, while also encouraging Bailey Turner's (Calen Mackenzie) crush on her. Gem later used Bailey to achieve her own needs. Gem's obsession with Georgia led her to manipulate and isolate her from her friends and fiancé. After showing her true colours, Gem attacked Georgia and left her for dead.

Critical opinion on the character has been mostly positive. She has been described as someone "viewers love to hate", a "superbitch" and a "fun whacko", but Gem also been called "one of the soap's most irritating characters". One critic thought Beck was doing "an excellent job" and the character's appearance and introduction also received positive attention.

== Casting ==
In September 2013, the show's then executive producer Richard Jasek teased Gem's introduction, saying established character Georgia Brooks (Saskia Hampele) would have "a relative coming to visit, who's going to cause absolute merry hell for everyone." That same month a promotional trailer previewing Gem's arrival was released. The character had previously been mentioned on-screen by her family members, but had never been seen before. It was also announced that actress Kathryn Beck had been cast in the guest role of Gem. Beck commented "I loved playing Gem because she pushes all the boundaries and just when you think she has gone too far, she goes further." The actress made her first screen appearance as Gem during the episode broadcast on 7 October 2013.

== Development ==
=== Introduction and characterisation ===
Gemma, better known as Gem, is the cousin of Georgia Brooks and Toadfish Rebecchi (Ryan Moloney). She comes to Erinsborough to catch up with Georgia, who is her favourite cousin and someone she has idolised since they were children. Shortly after arriving in town, Gem literally bumps into Kyle Canning (Chris Milligan) and he spills coffee down herself. Unaware that Kyle is Georgia's boyfriend, Gem flirts with him and makes advances towards him. Beck explained "Gem comes on to him not realising who he is. It's very awkward!" A TV Week writer stated that the incident would not be the last time Gem would display strange behaviour and Beck added that when it becomes clear Gem is here to stay, things would get interesting. Georgia is happy to see her cousin and wanting her to stay around permanently, Georgia convinces Toadie to let Gem move into his house.

Gem settles in well and tries to forge friendships with some of her new neighbours. Daniel Kilkelly from Digital Spy reported that just as things appear to be going well, it would become clear that Gem is keeping secrets surrounding her past. Gem was also billed as "a schemer" who would "rock Erinsborough to its core". Kilkelly also said that Gem seems obsessed with her cousin and would try to "divide and conquer" anyone who is close to her. Of her character, Beck commented "While Gem is cunning, she isn't necessarily convincing – so a lot of people have worked out Gem has an agenda. But, I think viewers will still feel some sympathy for her." When Gem eavesdrops on a private conversation between Kyle and Georgia's best friend, Kate (Ashleigh Brewer), Beck explained that this was a sign the layers were being pulled back to reveal Gem's real agenda and viewers would not be expecting it at all.

=== Sabotaging students ===
Toadie asks Susan Kennedy (Jackie Woodburne) to hire Gem as the new biology teacher at Erinsborough High when the position becomes vacant. After she is given the job, it emerges that Gem is scarred by a "scandalous" dismissal from her previous school and she assures her mother over the phone that she is ready to return to teaching. A Soap World columnist wrote "Now that she's comfortably settled into the school and the Rebecchi house, Gem's unable to shield her true personality any longer." Showing "a nasty streak", Gem humiliates her student Josie Lamb (Madison Daniel), who is struggling with low self-esteem. When Kate learns of the incident, she talks to Georgia about Gem's behaviour, causing them to fall out.

Gem then turns her attention to Imogen Willis (Ariel Kaplan) and her intention to run for school captain. Gem becomes annoyed by Imogen's confidence and manipulates her friend Amber Turner (Jenna Rosenow) into standing against her. When she realises Imogen's confidence has not been crushed enough to force her to withdraw from the race, Gem decides to steal some votes for Imogen, so Amber will win. When Amber's younger brother Bailey (Calen Mackenzie) catches Gem out, he guilts her into replacing the votes, but he is unprepared when Gem propositions him into keeping his silence.

=== Manipulation of Bailey Turner and Georgia Brooks ===
"I thought how would Georgia not see all of this manipulation that's going on with Gemma, but Kathryn was just so incredibly talented and managed to convince me that there was nothing bad going on in the background."

— Hampele on Gem's manipulation of Georgia

Gem decides to use Bailey to her advantage and realises that his recent break-up has left him vulnerable to manipulation. An "uneasy chemistry" develops between the pair and Mackenzie stated that Gem makes Bailey believe that they could be more than just friends, calling the storyline not "your usual teacher/student dynamic." Gem continues to encourage Bailey's crush on her and champions his place on a school trip to China. When Gem fakes an accident, Susan and Toadie's become suspicious about her motivations, while Gem uses Bailey's concern for her. She tells him that she is withdrawing her support for his placement on the China trip, saying that she cannot bear to be away from him. Seeing that Bailey is "smitten" with her, Gem believes she can use him to achieve her own needs. Gem starts to enjoy Bailey's attention and they develop "a firm friendship", which results in Imogen catching them holding hands at Lassiter's Lake. Imogen reports what she has seen to Susan, which leads to Gem threatening her.

At the same time, Gem also begins causing trouble between Georgia and Kyle, by encouraging her cousin to apply for an overseas job. When Georgia and Kyle become engaged, Gem's displeasure at the event does not go unnoticed by Toadie, who contacts her mother looking for answers. Gem's mother then voices her concerns for her daughter's "erratic" behaviour, making Toadie suspicious of Gem. When Georgia notices the tension between Kate and Gem, she asks her cousin to be more friendly towards Kate. However, Kate angrily accuses Gem of being jealous of her close friendship with Georgia and that it is only a matter of time before Georgia sees what a horrible person she is. This causes Gem to try to find something on Kate that will cause more trouble. Using Bailey, Gem hacks Kate's laptop and finds an unsent email from Kate to Kyle, detailing a one-night stand between them. Gem then plants the email amongst the congratulatory notices at Georgia and Kyle's engagement party, exposing the affair. Gem is pleased when Georgia leans on her for support, but becomes "increasingly infuriated" by her inner strength and tries to isolate her, by taking her away to a private cottage. Beck told a TV Week writer that Gem is aware of how vulnerable Georgia is and realises that it is her chance to embed herself further in Georgia's life.

At the cottage, Gem steals Georgia's phone, cutting her off from the outside world, and tells her the car will not start when she wants to leave. Beck thought that what Gem does to keep Georgia to herself was "quite unhinged." When Georgia finds her phone in Gem's bag and learns that Gem hacked into Kate's laptop, Gem shows her true colours. The cousins argue and Georgia inadvertently turns the gas stove on, before she is knocked unconscious. Gem panics and then flees the scene of the crime. The storyline formed part of the show's season finale and Beck added that "everything is unravelling for Gem." Gem made her last screen appearance on 10 January 2014. When asked if Gem would return in the future, series producer Jason Herbison commented that there was certainly scope for her to return.

== Storylines ==
While she is coming out of Grease Monkeys, Gem runs into Kyle Canning and spills her coffee down herself. She takes off her top and Kyle gives her his shirt and offers to buy her a new coffee. She tells Kyle her name is Ursula and she flirts with him, but becomes angry when Kyle tells her he has a girlfriend. Gem turns up at Number 30 to see her cousin Georgia and is surprised to see Kyle. She apologises for lying about her name and asks Kyle to keep their first meeting a secret. Gem and Georgia's cousin Toadie allows Gem to stay with his family and Gem meets Georgia's best friend Kate Ramsay. While dancing with Georgia, Gem hurts her hip and Toadie reveals that Gem was involved in a serious quad biking accident, which left her in a coma. During that time, her fiancé left her for another woman. Gem is interviewed by Susan Kennedy for a teaching post at Erinsborough High, but fails to impress her. Toadie convinces Susan to give Gem a chance, and Gem is given a job as a Biology teacher. Gem favours the boys over the girls during her classes and her teaching ability is questioned. Gem tells Georgia about her first meeting with Kyle, which briefly causes tension between Georgia and Kyle. Gem destroys Josie Lamb's already fragile self-confidence, and she then drives a wedge between Kate and Georgia.

Gem proposes that she and Georgia rent Number 24; however, she cancels the application when Georgia tells her that Kyle will be moving in too. She is caught out by Kyle and Georgia and Gem tells Georgia that she could not face living with a couple. When Imogen Willis runs for school captain, Gem becomes annoyed with her confidence and tries to rig the vote. Bailey catches her out and threatens to report her, but Gem manipulates Bailey into believing that she has feelings for him. Gem continues to encourage Bailey's crush on her, while Imogen begins questioning Gem's teaching methods. Imogen later spots Gem and Bailey holding hands and tells Susan. Gem looks through Imogen's school file and learns Imogen is suffering from bulimia. Gem threatens to reveal Imogen's condition, but Imogen opens up to her classmates herself. Gem is not happy when Georgia and Kyle get engaged and fakes an injury to take the attention away from them. She is pleased when Bailey visits her in hospital and tells him she does not want him to go on a school trip, as she will miss him. Gem asks Bailey to hack into Kate's laptop, claiming that Kate is plotting against her. They find an unsent email from Kate to Kyle detailing their one-night stand.

When she learns Georgia and Kyle plan to move into number 24 alone, she buys a dress to outshine Georgia at her engagement party and puts Kate's email amongst the congratulations messages, where Georgia reads it out. A devastated Georgia leans on Gem for support and agrees to go away to a private cottage with her. After they leave, Toadie learns from Gem's mother that Gem caused her quad bike accident to trap her fiancé into marriage. Bailey also admits that Gem got him to hack into Kate's laptop. At the cottage, Georgia finds her phone in Gem's bag and learns Gem hacked Kate's laptop. Georgia confronts Gem, who pushes her into a cooker, causing the gas to come on. Georgia tries to leave and Gem pushes her again, causing Georgia to hit her head and fall unconscious. Gem panics and leaves Georgia alone in the gas filled cottage. A couple of days later, Gem leaves Georgia's car at the hospital and meets with Bailey. He tells Gem that Georgia is fine, but she is shocked when he tells her the gas was on when she left. Gem assures Bailey that it was all an accident. Bailey suggests Gem explains herself to the police, then reveals that he read Gem's diary. Gem goes to the hospital with a cut hand, and apologises for leaving Georgia in the cottage alone. Gem gets agitated when Kate and Kyle come into the room and she tells Georgia that Kate loves Kyle. The police then take Gem for questioning and arrange for a psychological evaluation, where she is given some medication. Georgia comes to say goodbye, saying she is grateful that she knows about Kate and Kyle, but is not happy about the way it happened. Toadie then takes Gem to meet her mother in Birregurra.

== Reception ==
A reporter from the Sunday Mail liked Gem's introduction, calling it "a classic move". They added that she was "an attractive stranger". Another reporter for the publication commented that she "may not be the most reliable teacher". A TV Week columnist branded Gem a "hottie" and a "blonde bombshell". Dianne Butler, writing for news.com.au, commented that Gem "has dangerously unstable eyes." Butler also quipped "Gem is the greatest strategist since Kevin Rudd" and said she could not wait to see how things ended between her and Georgia. Melinda Houston from The Sun-Herald praised both the character and actress, saying "There's something enduringly creepy about the Single White Female and the addition of Gem to Ramsay Street makes a nice variation on the assorted femme fatales and bad boys that are Neighbours usual fodder. And Kathryn Beck (Home and Away, East of Everything) is doing an excellent job." John Burfitt from TV Week hoped Gem would be sticking around "so there's a bad girl in town."

Gem was also included in TV Week's "screen meanies" feature, where a columnist wrote "Move over, Paul Robinson, Erinsborough has a new baddie!" The columnist said Gem's most villainous act was leaving Georgia for dead. Rebecca Lake from the same publication called her a "fun whacko". The Age's Larissa Dubecki said "Another year, another psycho alert in the Anglo-Saxon enclave of Erinsborough", while also branding Gem "increasingly unstable". A writer for TV Soap observed that the addition of "superbitch" Gem was another new direction for Neighbours and that she was the first bad girl "viewers love to hate" since Izzy Hoyland (Natalie Bassingthwaighte). The Daily Star's Peter Dyke and Katie Begley called Gem "an evil schemer". While reviewing the 2014 season opener for the Herald Sun, critic Cameron Adams named the episode as one of his picks of the day. He observed that the life or death drama from Gemma's "less than voluntary" trip with Georgia was "not quite as high-budget as the Summer Bay bomb", but he was left wondering whether Georgia would be okay having been "gassed and Gemma'd", before asking "where's ol' crazy guts Gemma racked off to?" Adams later noted "Oh, and in between a love triangle elsewhere, Gemma turns the crazy up to 11 again."

== See also ==
- List of soap opera villains
- List of Neighbours characters (2013)
