= Bojana Novakovic =

Australian actress (born 1981)

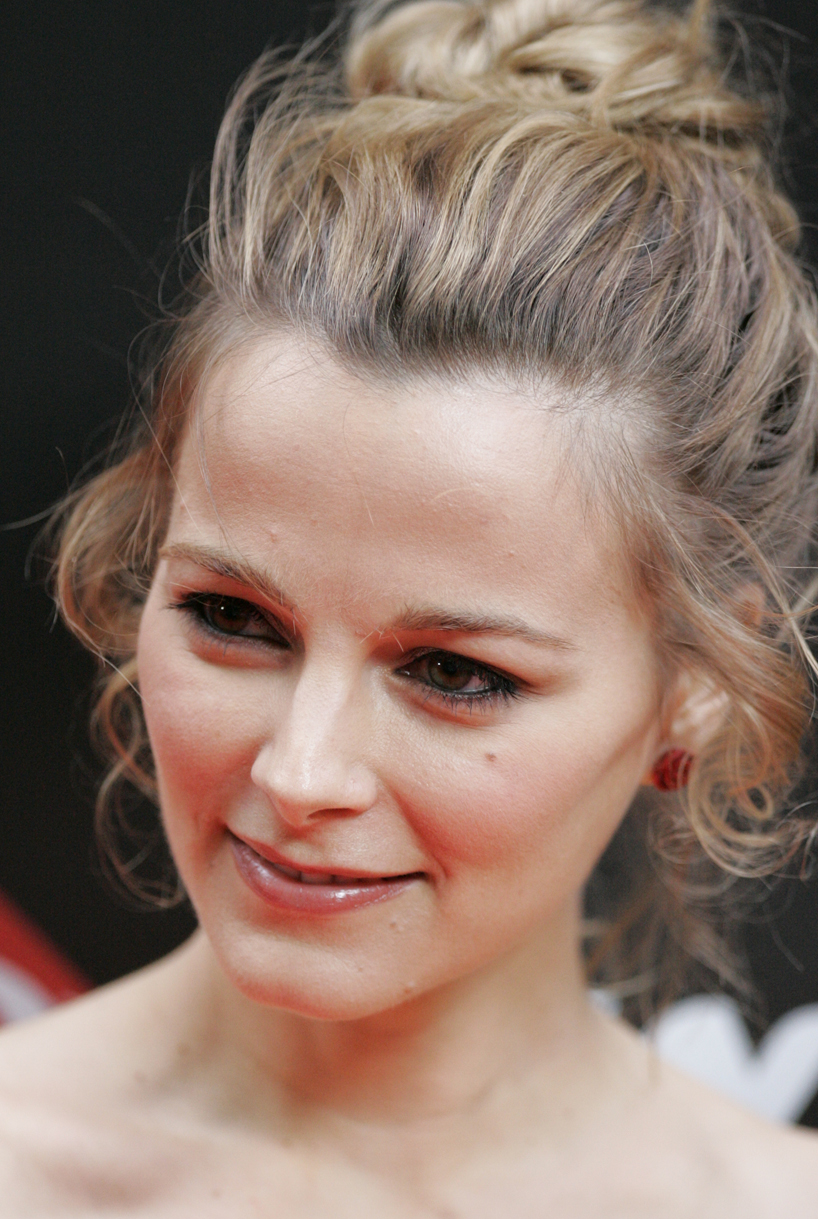
- Novakovic in 2012
- Born: 17 November 1981 (age 44); Belgrade, SR Serbia, Yugoslavia
- Citizenship: Australia
- Education: National Institute of Dramatic Art
- Occupations: Actress; filmmaker
- Years active: 1994–present

Bojana Novakovic (Note: Serbian Cyrillic: Бојана Новаковић; Serbian: Bojana Novaković. Bojana is pronounced boy-yana.) (born 17 November 1981) is an Australian actress and filmmaker. She is known for starring in the police procedural television series Instinct (2018–2019) and the family drama series Love Me (2021–2023), for which she was nominated for several awards. In film, she has appeared in Drag Me to Hell (2009), Edge of Darkness (2010), Devil (2010), Generation Um... (2012), The Little Death (2014), I, Tonya (2017), and Birds of Prey (2020).

Novakovic wrote, directed, filmed, and co-produced in her first feature film, a documentary set in Serbia, titled The Forbidden Aunt, which has its world premiere on 16 October 2026. Born in Serbia, Novakovic immigrated to Australia as a child.

== Early life and education ==
Novakovic was born on 17 November 1981 to computer programmers Biljana and Radovan Novakovic in Belgrade, then the capital of SR Serbia, SFR Yugoslavia. When she was seven years old, the family immigrated to Australia, settling in Sydney, New South Wales.

In Australia, Biljana became a sculptor, gaining two master's degrees in fine arts. Novakovic studied at The McDonald College, where she was dux in 1998. In 2002, she graduated from the National Institute of Dramatic Art.

== Career ==
=== Stage ===
Novakovic's theatre credits in Australia include These People, Away and Strange Fruit at the Sydney Theatre Company; The Female of the Species at the Melbourne Theatre Company; Woyzeck (Helpmann award nomination for best supporting actress in 2009), Criminology (Green Room award nomination for best actress 2007), Eldorado (Helpmann nomination for best supporting actress, 2006) and Necessary Targets at the Malthouse Theatre in Melbourne, Death Variations and Loveplay (Ride On) for B Sharp, Romeo and Juliet with Bell Shakespeare company and Debris for Ride on Theatre (which received a Green Room nomination for best Independent production and best actress in 2006).

For some years Novakovic ran her own independent theatre company, Ride On Theatre (Sydney and Melbourne) with co-director Tanya Goldberg. She was a producer and performer for the 2004 Ride on Theatre sell-out season of LOVEPLAY at the Downstairs Belvoir Street Theatre, and the 2006 Green Room nominated production of Debris (in which she was also nominated for best actress).

In 2008, she translated, adapted, and directed Fake Porno in Melbourne, which was invited to be part of the Powerhouse season in Brisbane in 2009, and also received three Green Room nominations, including best production. Outside of Ride On, she wrote and directed with Melbourne's Black Lung Theatre for the critically acclaimed production of Sugar at the 2007 Adelaide Fringe festival. In 2010, Novakovic received an AFI nomination for International Award for Best Actress for her role in Edge of Darkness. In May 2012, she starred in a Ride On improvised theatrical production called The Blind Date project at the Brisbane Powerhouse which was later also performed in Sydney and Santa Monica, California.

=== Screen ===
In 2003, Novakovic played Randa in the ABC mini-series Marking Time, a role which won her an AFI Award for "Best Actress in a Leading Role in a Television Drama or Comedy". As an actress, Novakovic's film credits in Australia include Blackrock (1996), Strange Fits of Passion (1998), The Monkey's Mask (1999), Thunderstruck (2004), Solo (2005) and the Serbian films The Optimists (2005) and Skinning (2010). From 2007 to 2009, she played Tippi in TV series Satisfaction for Showtime Australia. She also appeared in Drag Me to Hell (2009), Edge of Darkness (2009), Devil (2010), Burning Man (2011), and Generation Um... (2012).

From 2013 to 2014, Novakovic starred on the American remake of comedy-drama television series Rake, which was cancelled after one season. In 2015, she portrayed Clare Hitchens in The Hallow, a horror film set in Ireland and directed by Corin Hardy. She had a recurring role on the fifth season of Shameless in 2014.

In 2025, Novakovic turned her hand to filmmaking, being screenwriter, director, cinematographer, and co-producer on the feature documentary film The Forbidden Aunt (Zabranjena tetka). The story focuses on a real-life aunt of Novakovic, the estranged Aunt Gordana, and reveals abuse, addiction, and generational trauma of women in Serbia. Filmed in Serbia and produced through Sense Productions, the film is supported by the Adelaide Film Festival Investment Fund, and is set to screen at the Adelaide Film Festival on 18 October 2026, in its world premiere.

== Filmography ==
=== Film ===
Year	Title	Role	Notes
1997	Blackrock	Tracy Warner	
1999	Strange Fits of Passion	Jaya	
2000	The Monkey's Mask	Tianna	
2004	Thunderstruck	Anna	
2006	Solo	Billie Finn	
2006	The Optimists	Marina	
2008	Seven Pounds	Julie	
2009	Drag Me to Hell	Ilenka Ganush	
2010	Edge of Darkness	Emma Craven	
2010	Devil	Young Woman / (Sarah Caraway)	
2010	Skinning	Mina	
2011	Burning Man	Sarah	
2012	Not Suitable for Children	Ava	
2013	Charlie's Country	Parole Officer	
2012	The King Is Dead!	Therese	
2012	Generation Um...	Violet	
2014	The Little Death	Maeve	
2015	The Hallow	Clare Hitchens	
2017	I, Tonya	Dody Teachman	
2017	Beyond Skyline	Audrey	
2018	Malicious	Lisa	
2020	Birds of Prey	Erika Manson	
2026	The Forbidden Aunt	Writer, director, cinematographer, co-producer	Documentary film

=== Television ===
Year	Title	Role	Notes
1997	Heartbreak High	Tasha	Episode: "6.29"
1998–1999	Wildside	Vildana Asimovic	Episodes: "1.29", "2.19"
1999	Big Sky	Leisa	Episode: "Desperate Measures"
1999	Murder Call	Sophie Misfud	Episode: "Bad Business"
1999	All Saints	Rachel Carpenter	Episode: "Ghosts of Christmas Past"
2000	Water Rats	Sarah Schreiber	Episode: "A Day to Remember (Break Your Heart)"
2003	Marking Time	Randa	TV miniseries
2004–2005	The Cooks	Raffa	Main role
2006	BlackJack: At the Gates	Nikki	TV film
2007–2009	Satisfaction	Tippi	Main role (seasons 1–2)
2014	Rake	Michaela "Mikki" Partridge	Main role
2015	Casanova	Madame de Pompadour	TV film
2015	Agatha	Agatha	TV film
2015–2016	Shameless	Bianca Samson	Recurring role (season 5)
2016	Westworld	Marti	Episode: "The Stray"
2018–2019	Instinct	Detective Lizzie Needham	Main role, 24 episodes
2020	Operation Buffalo	Molly	Recurring role, 5 episodes
2021	MacGyver	Anya Vitez	Episode: "Jack + Kinematics + Safe Cracker + MgKNO3 + GTO"
2021–2023	Love Me	Clara Mathieson	Main role
2024	Chicago P.D.	Josephine Petrovic	Episodes: 11x07–11x08, 11x10, 11x12–11x13
2026	Your Friends & Neighbors	Cricket Birch	Episode: "2.5"

== Awards and nominations ==
Year	Award	Category	Work	Result	Ref.
2004	Australian Film Institute	Best Actress in a Leading Role in a Television Drama or Comedy	Marking Time	Won	
2008	ASTRA Awards	Most Outstanding Performance by an Actor – Female	Satisfaction	Nominated	
2010	Australian Film Institute	Best Actress	Edge of Darkness	Nominated	
2012	Film Critics Circle of Australia Awards	Best Actress – Leading Role	Burning Man	Nominated	
2013	Australian Film Critics Association Awards	Best Supporting Actress	Burning Man	Nominated	
2022	AACTA Awards	Best Lead Actress in a Drama	Love Me	Nominated	
2022	Logie Awards	Most Popular Actress	Love Me	Nominated	
2024	AACTA Awards	Best Lead Actress in a Drama	Love Me	Nominated	
