= Rodrigo Balart =

Australian film editor

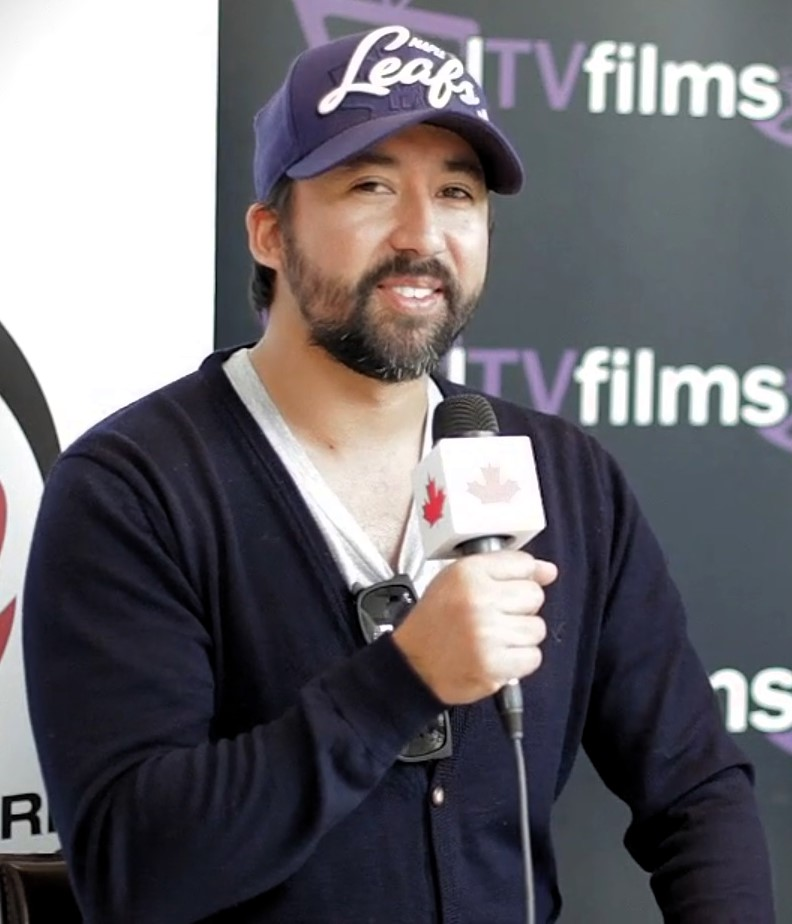
- Balart at the 2012 Toronto International Film Festival
- Born: Valparaiso, Chile
- Occupation: Film editor

Rodrigo Balart is an Australian film editor, best known for Restraint, Road Train & Black Water, the latter of which he was nominated for Best Editing at the 2007 AFI Awards. He was also nominated for the ASE Award for editing the telemovie Hawke. He won the 2017 AACTA Award for Best Editing in Television for Seven Types of Ambiguity.

== Filmography ==
Year	Film	Director	Notes
2005	Mind the Gap	Rachel Givney	Short film
2007	Skin	Claire McCarthy	Short film
2007	Black Water	David Nerlich; Andrew Traucki	Nominated—AACTA Award for Best Editing; Nominated—FCCA Award for Best Editor; Nominated—Inside Film Award for Best Editing
2008	Newcastle	Dan Castle	
2008	The Eternity Man	Julien Temple	
2008	Restraint	David Denneen	
2008	Cannot Buy My Soul	Paul Goldman	
2009	Echo	Jim Lounsbury	Short film
2009	Into My Arms	Angus Stevens	Short film
2010	Stay Awake	Rebecca Rocheford Davies	Short film
2010	David Campbell on Broadway	Larry Meltzer	TV documentary
2010	Road Train	Dean Francis	
2010	Hawke	Emma Freeman	Telemovie; Nominated—ASE Award for Best Editing in a Television Drama
2012	Storm Surfers 3D	Justin McMillan; Christopher Nelius	Documentary; Nominated—AACTA Award for Best Editing in a Documentary
2012	Bait 3D	Kimble Rendall	
2014	Schapelle	Khoa Do	Telemovie
2014	INXS: Never Tear Us Apart	Daina Reid	Miniseries
2014	Chalk an Australian Perspective	Andi Mether	Also co-writer
2015	Sucker	Ben Chessell	
2016	Red Dog: True Blue	Kriv Stenders	
2017	The Butterfly Tree	Priscilla Cameron	
2018	In Like Flynn	Russell Mulcahy	
