= Storm Surfers 3D =

2012 Australian documentary film

- Film poster
- Directed by: Justin McMillan; Christopher Nelius
- Produced by: Ellenor Cox; Marcus Gillezeau
- Starring: Ross Clarke-Jones; Tom Carroll
- Narrated by: Toni Collette
- Cinematography: David Maguire
- Edited by: Rodrigo Balart
- Music by: Richard Tognetti; Michael Yezerski
- Production companies: 6ixty Foot Films; Firelight Productions; Red Bull Films
- Release date: 14 August 2012
- Running time: 95 minutes
- Country: Australia
- Language: English

Storm Surfers 3D is an Australian documentary film, directed by Justin McMillan and Christopher Nelius and released in 2012. Narrated by Toni Collette, the film centres on Ross Clarke-Jones and Tom Carroll, two Australian surfers who specialize in tow-in surfing.

The film had its Australian theatrical premiere in August 2012. It was screened in September at the 2012 Toronto International Film Festival, where it was named first runner-up for the People's Choice Award for Documentaries.

It subsequently won the AACTA Award for Best Feature Length Documentary at the 2nd AACTA Awards in 2013. It was also nominated in the AACTA award categories for Best Editing in a Documentary and Best Cinematography in a Documentary.
