= Not Suitable for Children =

- Theatrical film poster
- Directed by: Peter Templeman
- Written by: Michael Lucas
- Produced by: Jodi Matterson
- Starring: Ryan Kwanten; Sarah Snook; Ryan Corr
- Cinematography: Lachlan Milne
- Edited by: Matthew Walker
- Music by: Jono Ma; Matteo Zingales
- Production companies: Wild Eddie; Exit Films; Frame, Set & Match
- Distributed by: Icon Film Distribution
- Release dates: 6 June 2012 (Sydney); 12 July 2012
- Running time: 97 minutes
- Country: Australia
- Language: English
- Budget: $4.5 million
- Box office: $468,959

Not Suitable for Children is a 2012 Australian romantic comedy film directed by Peter Templeman and written by Michael Lucas. It was released on 12 July 2012. It stars Ryan Kwanten, Sarah Snook, and Ryan Corr.

== Plot ==
Jonah (Ryan Kwanten) is a young man without a care in the world. At one of his parties, the power goes out because Jonah has not paid his electric bill, but it gets turned back on thanks to his neighbor. Jonah meets up with Becky (Kathryn Beck) and they retreat up to his room away from the party, only for Becky to find a lump in Jonah's testicle. Jonah goes to see a doctor, who reveals that Jonah has testicular cancer. He tells Jonah that they can remove it in time, but Jonah's upset that he won't be able to father children. The doctor suggests that Jonah uses a sperm bank in the event that he would like to have children after the operation.

Now at a sperm bank, Jonah is left in a room to privately produce his semen. After he is finished, he returns home to his best friends and fellow party hosts, Stevie (Sarah Snook) and Gus (Ryan Corr). When Stevie arrives home from work, Gus blurts out that Jonah has cancer, much to Jonah's dismay. Gus asks if he would still like to have the party scheduled for the coming Friday, and Jonah allows them to keep the date, not wanting to explain his condition to party-goers.

Jonah receives a call from the sperm bank and goes in for a meeting. The nurse explains that Jonah falls into a small percentage of men whose sperm cannot be frozen because of biological complications. Jonah asks what other options there are, now very worried that he will never have children. The nurse replies with, "Well, do you have a girlfriend?"

Jonah then begins the complicated journey of finding a woman to carry his child. He first approaches his ex-girlfriend Ava (Bojana Novakovic) who is disgusted with Jonah for even contacting her. He then tries Becky (or "Stalker Becky" as Gus calls her) who rejects him by claiming she never thought of her and Jonah as a couple. Jonah never tells the girls he asks that he has cancer. Jonah goes back to the doctor to ask for more time and moves his operation three weeks.

Meanwhile, Gus, Stevie, and Jonah realize that hosting parties could be their job. After the power went out in the earlier party and party-goers pitched in to help pay, Gus realizes that the three of them could make a weekly salary if they held a party once a week. Jonah's first "paycheck" is worth over $700.

Jonah then begins making lists of all the women he has ever dated or known and asks them if they would ever consider after his child. He is rejected by all the women he asks. Stevie suggests adoption and Jonah looks into it, but soon figures out that in order to be a candidate for adoption you must have a clean health record, and Jonah has "cancer" written all over his. After having no luck, Stevie suggests that Jonah try an "arrangement" with a woman. Stevie says she knows of a lesbian couple at her work who were looking into sperm donation and sets up a meeting for Jonah. The meeting does not go in Jonah's favour and the couple declines Jonah's offer. Stevie suggests another woman at work who wants a child, but is not married and sets up a meeting with her too. Although Jonah goes home with her, he ends up not sleeping with her. He claims that he was too drunk to have sex and couldn't focus.

Stevie starts to like the idea of an arrangement, especially after Jonah claims that he would give his house to the woman who carried his child. Stevie accidentally tips off Jonah that she would be interested in a deal and sends Jonah out of her room to think.

At the weekly party Stevie stays in her room, claiming that she has a migraine. Jonah calls her and tells her that he would give her anything if she would carry the child. The morning after the party, Jonah receives a text message from Stevie asking him to come to her room. It is revealed that the whole night Stevie stayed up and wrote a contract concerning her and Jonah's deal. Jonah reads through the contract and signs it and Stevie tells him that they have a four-day window that Stevie should be ovulating in.

They book a room at a cheap motel for the four days, with the final being two days before Jonah's operation. Stevie and Jonah go to a pharmacy and buy a syringe because Stevie does not want to have sex with Jonah. Back at the motel, Jonah accidentally breaks the syringe. Stevie says that it should be okay, they just missed the first day of a four-day window. Jonah is frustrated and Stevie gives in and says she is okay with natural. They have sex, and for the rest of the four days they meet at the hotel, have sex, and then stagger their arrival at home so Gus doesn't notice.

On the fifth day while Stevie is at work, she gets her period. She calls Jonah and asks him to meet her outside her work. They get into a fight, with Stevie claiming she was happy her period came because she was having second thoughts anyway. Jonah leaves, realizing he is out of time.

Stevie is absent at the party that night, but Gus has made a call to Ava. Ava arrives at the party, first mad at Jonah for not telling her he had cancer and then says she would carry his child if he wanted. They go upstairs to his room and have sex, but Jonah pulls out at the last moment because he realizes he is in love with Stevie. Jonah leaves to go find her, hoping she is home. Jonah asks Ava to stay in his room. Jonah finds Stevie, but Ava comes out of Jonah's room and Stevie storms off, feeling betrayed. Meanwhile, the police arrive to stop the party.

Jonah catches up to Stevie and tells her that he loves her, but Stevie leaves.

The next morning, Jonah's sister comes to pick him and Gus up for the operation. Jonah is sad at first, but Stevie does show up for moral support. Stevie tells Jonah (in front of Gus, who never suspected anything going on between them) that she thought Jonah would make a great father and he should look into sperm donation or adoption with her. They kiss and Jonah is wheeled away into the operating room. The final line of the movie is, "What the f***." Said by a very confused Gus.

== Cast ==
- Ryan Kwanten as Jonah
- Sarah Snook as Stevie
- Ryan Corr as Gus
- Bojana Novakovic as Ava
- Alice Parkinson as Alison
- Daniel Henshall as Dave
- Clare Bowen as Gypsy
- Kathryn Beck as Becky
- Susan Prior as Marcy
- Tasneem Roc as Miranda

== Reception ==
Not Suitable for Children earned AUD$468,959 at the Australian box office. The film received positive reviews from critics, earning an 88% approval rating on Rotten Tomatoes.

== Awards and nominations ==
Award	Category	Subject	Result
AACTA Awards (2nd)	Best Actress in a Leading Role	Sarah Snook	Nominated
AACTA Awards (2nd)	Best Original Music Score	Jono Ma	Won
AACTA Awards (2nd)	Best Original Music Score	Matteo Zingales	Won
AACTA Awards (2nd)	Best Actor in a Supporting Role	Ryan Corr	Nominated
AACTA Awards (2nd)	Best Original Screenplay	Michael Lucas	Nominated
AWGIE Award	Best Writing in a Feature Film - Original	Michael Lucas	Won
FCCA Awards	Best Film		Nominated
FCCA Awards	Best Director	Peter Templeman	Nominated
FCCA Awards	Best Actress	Sarah Snook	Won
FCCA Awards	Best Actor in a Supporting Role	Ryan Corr	Won
FCCA Awards	Best Music Score	Jono Ma	Nominated
FCCA Awards	Best Music Score	Matteo Zingales	Nominated
