= Jocelyn Moorhouse =

Australian film director

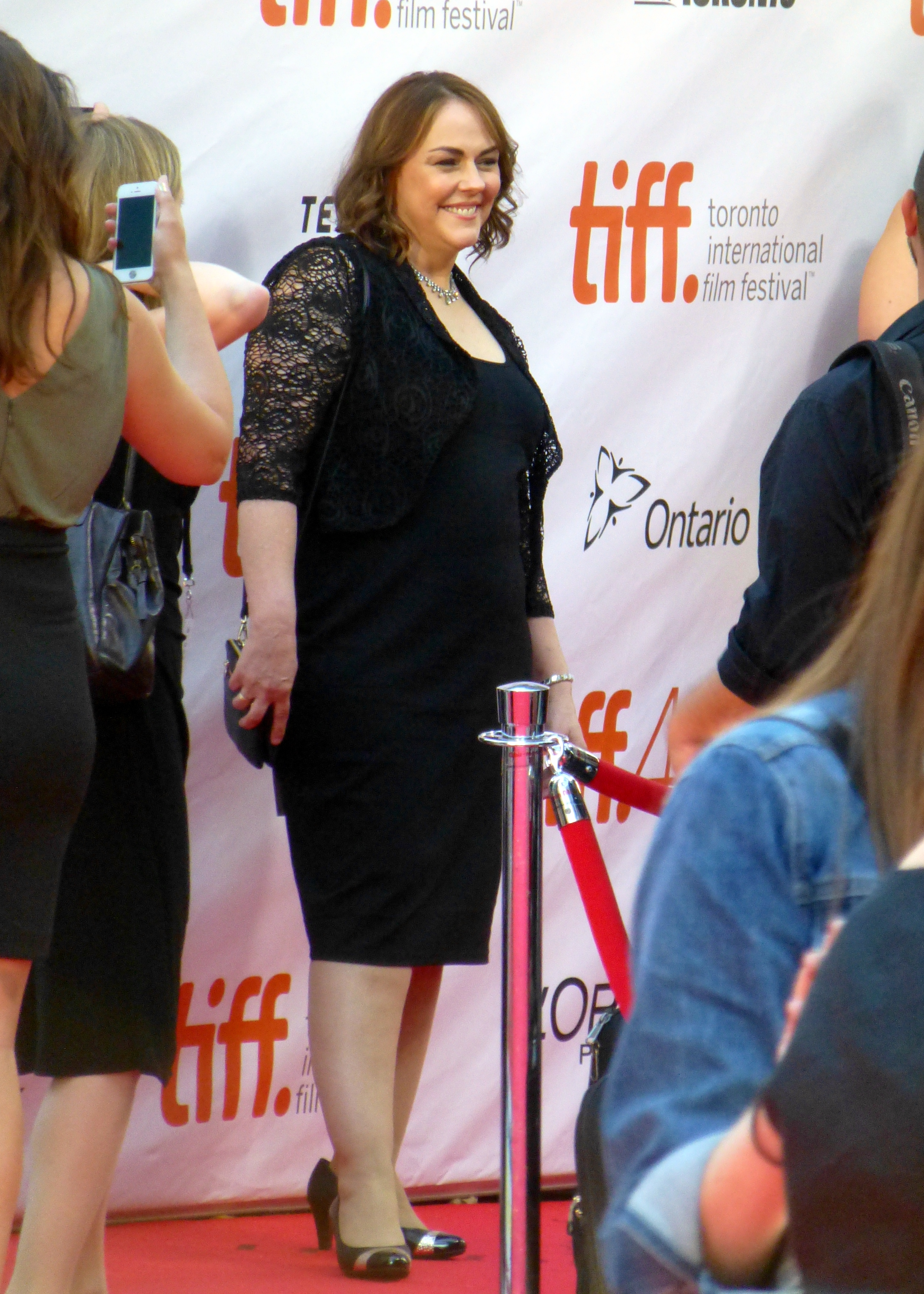
- Moorhouse at the premiere of The Dressmaker at TIFF, September 2015
- Born: 1960 or 1961; Melbourne, Victoria, Australia
- Occupations: Film director, screenwriter
- Spouse: P.J. Hogan
- Children: 4
- Awards: Australian Film Institute Award for Best Direction 1991; Australian Film Institute Award for Best Screenplay 1991; Australian Film Institute Award for Best Film 1994

Jocelyn Denise Moorhouse (born 1960 or 1961) is an Australian screenwriter and film director. She is best known for directing films Proof, How to Make an American Quilt, A Thousand Acres and The Dressmaker.

Moorhouse has also collaborated with her husband, film director P. J. Hogan on films such as Muriel's Wedding (1994) and Mental (2012).

== Early life and education ==
Jocelyn Denise Moorhouse was born in 1960 or 1961 in Melbourne, Victoria.

After finishing school, Moorhouse enrolled in the Australian Film, Television and Radio School (AFTRS). It was while studying at AFTRS that Moorhouse completed her first short film entitled Pavane in 1983. She graduated from AFTRS in 1984.

== Career ==
Moorhouse started work as television script editor after graduation from AFTRS. .

She created a 12-part series called c/o The Bartons for ABC Television in 1988, which was based on one of her short films at AFTRS called The Siege of the Bartons' Bathroom. Some of the other television shows she worked on included The Flying Doctors, Out of the Blue, A Place to Call Home, and The Humpty Dumpty Man.

Moorhouse made her feature film debut in 1991 with Proof. The idea for the film came from her interest in blindness and photography. She initially intended it to be a short film, but not being able to secure the funding for a short, she decided to make it into a feature film instead. It took five years to go into production, but when it did it had a budget of $1.1 million. The film ended up taking six weeks to shoot in Melbourne during the winter of 1990.

The success of Proof brought Moorhouse bigger and better opportunities. She followed up with her first "Hollywood blockbuster" with How to Make an American Quilt in 1995. Anne Bancroft, Winona Ryder, Kate Nelligan, Dermot Mulroney, and Alfre Woodard all had roles in the film, which was met with mixed reviews.

Her next feature film was A Thousand Acres in 1997, an adaptation of the Pulitzer Prize-winning novel by Jane Smiley. The film is about the relationship between a father and three daughters when tragedy is introduced into their lives. It starred Jessica Lange, Michelle Pfeiffer, Jennifer Jason Leigh, and Jason Robards and was also met with mixed reviews. In 1999 both Hogan and Moorhouse through the Hogan Moorhouse Pictures company signed deal with Sony.

In 2012, Moorhouse directed the play Sex with Strangers for the Sydney Theatre Company, which was well reviewed by online magazine Crikey.

The Dressmaker (2015) stars Kate Winslet, Judy Davis, Liam Hemsworth, and Hugo Weaving. The film was based on the novel by Rosalie Ham and is about a dressmaker who returns to her home in Australia to take care of her ailing, mentally unstable mother.

Moorhouse directed Troppo, an eight-part television crime drama series set in North Queensland, for ABC Television in 2021. The series debuted in February 2022.

=== Collaborations ===
Moorhouse was producer of her husband's films Muriel's Wedding in 1994 and Mental in 2012, and was screenwriter for his 2002 film Unconditional Love.

== Personal life ==
Moorhouse married film director P. J. Hogan. They have four children, two of whom have autism. In April 2019, Moorhouse spoke on the ABC Television program Australian Story about how their relationship had developed and how having the children had affected their personal and professional lives, including a move back to Australia from the US.

Her memoir, in which Moorhouse writes about her career as well as her personal and family life, Unconditional Love: A Memoir of Filmmaking and Motherhood, was published in April 2019.

== Filmography ==
Year	Title	Director	Writer	Producer	Ref.
1983	Pavane	Yes	Yes	No	
1991	Proof	Yes	Yes	No	
1994	Muriel's Wedding	No	No	Yes	
1995	How to Make an American Quilt	Yes	No	No	
1997	A Thousand Acres	Yes	No	No	
2002	Unconditional Love	No	Yes	Yes	
2012	Mental	No	No	Yes	
2015	The Dressmaker	Yes	Yes	No	
2024	The Fabulous Four	Yes	Yes	No	

== Awards and nominations ==
Year	Award	Category	Title	Result	Notes
2015	Mill Valley Film Festival	Audience Award	The Dressmaker		
2015	FCCA Award	Best Director	The Dressmaker	Nominated	
2015	AFCA Award	Best Director	The Dressmaker	Nominated	
2015	AFCA Award	Best Screenplay	The Dressmaker		
2015	AACTA Awards	People's Choice Award for Favourite Australian Film	The Dressmaker		
2015	AACTA Awards	Best Direction	The Dressmaker	Nominated	
1994	AACTA Awards	Best Film	Muriel's Wedding	Won	
1991	São Paulo International Film Festival	Critics Award	Proof	Won	
1991	Tokyo International Film Festival	Bronze Award	Proof	Won	
1991	Chicago International Film Festival	Silver Hugo	Proof	Won	
1991	Cannes Film Festival	Golden Camera	Proof	Won	
1991	British Film Institute	Sutherland Trophy	Proof	Won	
1991	AACTA Awards	Best Screenplay, Original or Adapted	Proof	Won	
1991	AACTA Awards	Best Direction	Proof	Won	

== Books ==
- Unconditional Love: A Memoir of Filmmaking and Motherhood (2019)
