= The Little Things (2010 film) =

- Promotional film poster
- Directed by: Neil McGregor
- Written by: Jon S. Henricks
- Produced by: Jacob Livermore; Neil McGregor
- Starring: Kathryn Beck; Chris Hillier; Tim Boyle; Cleo Massey
- Cinematography: Graeme McMahon
- Release date: November 2010 (Gold Coast Film Festival)
- Running time: 86 minutes
- Country: Australia
- Language: English

The Little Things is an indie-rom-com with a supernatural twist. Supported by an alternative soundtrack it tells the story of a girl named Dee (AFI Nominated Actress Kathryn Beck), who believes she has a gift that can alter people destinies, provided she never leaves her house. However, when her powers are threatened by the possibility of eviction her only hope is the first love and life she effected with her gift, Mitch. (Chris Hillier) But he may not be so willing to help when he finds out his entire life has been manipulated all along.

== Cast ==
- Chris Hillier as Mitch
- Kathryn Beck as Dee
- Cleo Massey as Young Dee
- Tim Boyle as Tom
- Marea Lambert-Barker Suzie
- Todd Levi as Angus
- Luke Howell as Young Mitch

== Accolades and screenings ==
- Maryland International Film Festival AWARD BEST FEATURE FILM
- The Indie AWARD Best Film
- The Indie AWARD Best Actress Kathryn Beck
- The Indie AWARD Best Director
- American International Film Festival AWARD Best Dramatic Feature
- American International Film Festival AWARD Best Actor
- American International Film Festival AWARD Best Actress
- American International Film Festival AWARD Most Promising New Actor
- American International Film Festival AWARD Most Promising New Actress
- Maryland International Film Festival OFFICIAL SELECTION
- Lucerne International Film Festival OFFICIAL SELECTION
- Melbourne Underground Film Festival OFFICIAL SELECTION
- Columbia Gorge International Film Festival OFFICIAL SELECTION
- American International Film Festival OFFICIAL SELECTION
- Gold Coast International Film Festival OFFICIAL SELECTION
