= Christopher Nelius =

Australian documentary director

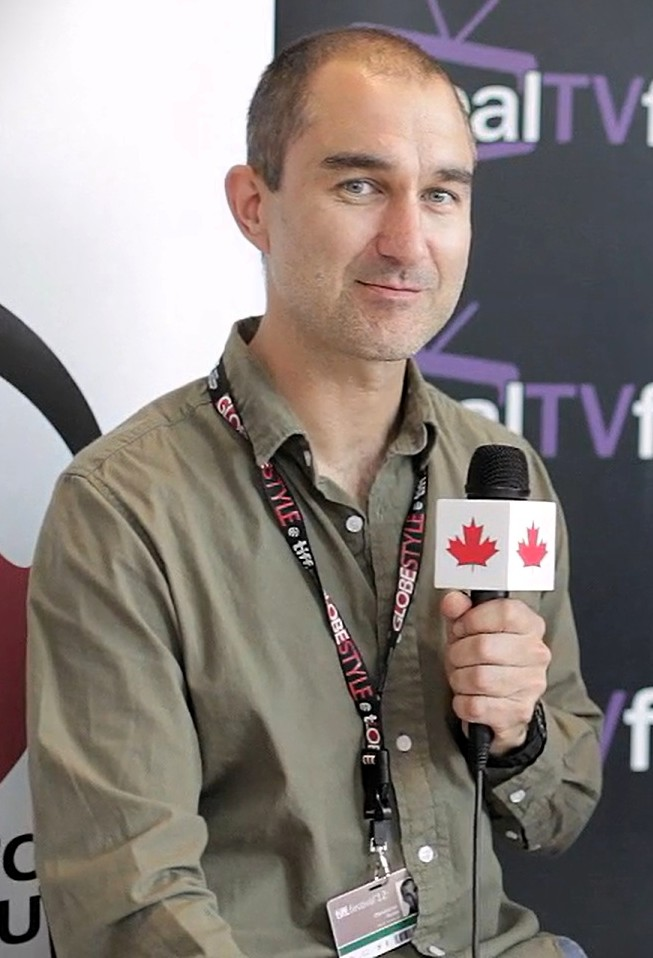
Nelius at Toronto International Film Festival 2012

Christopher Nelius is an Australian documentary film director. He is most noted as co-director with Justin McMillan of the 2012 film Storm Surfers 3D, which was first runner-up for the People's Choice Award for Documentaries at the 2012 Toronto International Film Festival, and won the AACTA Award for Best Feature Length Documentary at the 2nd AACTA Awards in 2013.

His 2020 film Girls Can't Surf was also an AACTA nominee for Best Documentary at the 11th AACTA Awards in 2021.

His 2025 film, about the Masters of Musical Whistling competition in Los Angeles, titled Whistle, premiered at the 2025 Toronto International Film Festival on 5 September 2025. It had its Australian premiere at the Sydney Film Festival in May 2026, and was also screened at Melbourne International Film Festival in August 2026. The film features Australian star Molly Lewis.
