= Matteo Zingales =

Australian film music composer (born 1980)

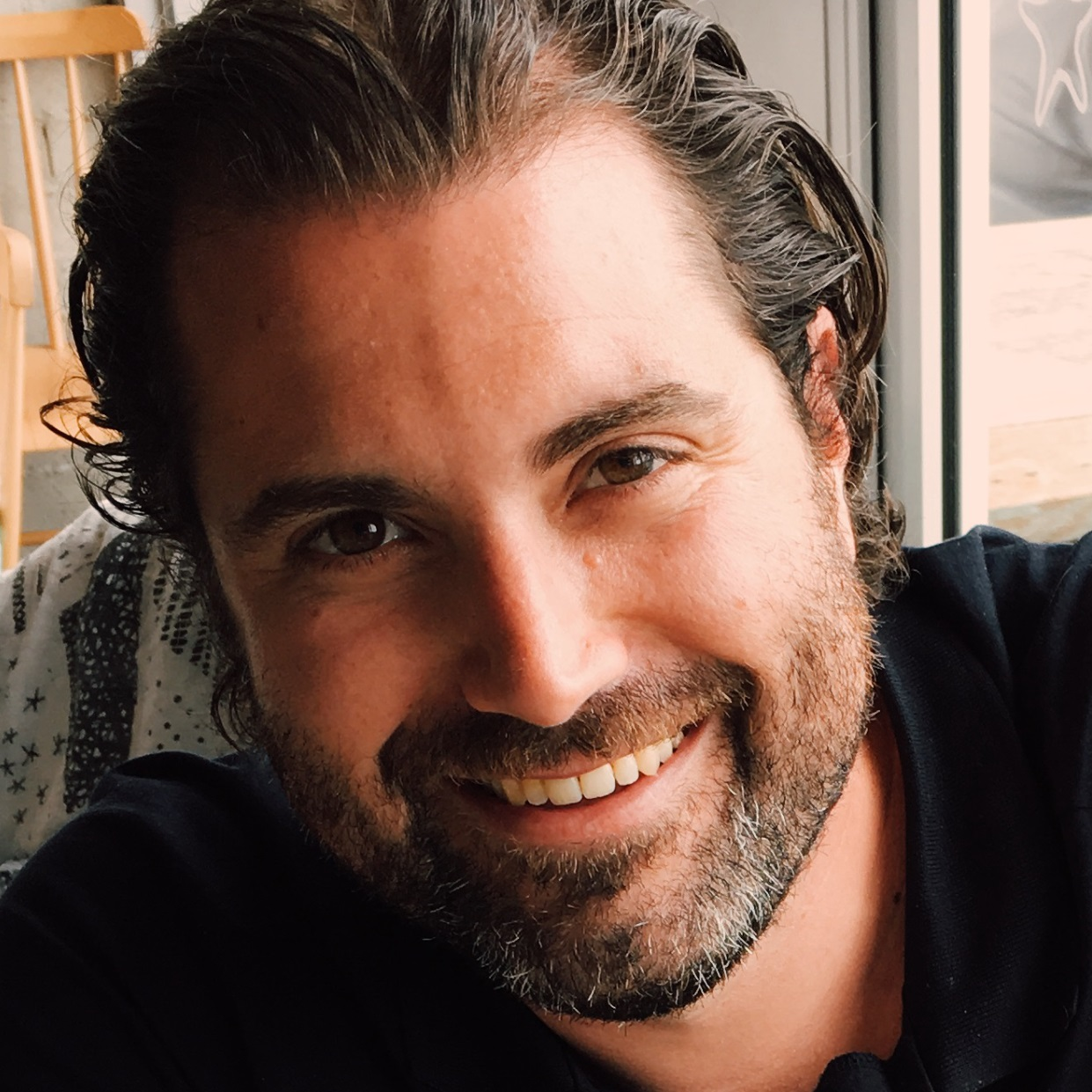

Background information
- Born: 28 October 1980 (age 45); Rome, Italy
- Origin: Sydney, Australia
- Genre: Soundtrack
- Occupations: Composer
- Instruments: Piano, percussion, keyboard, synthesizer
- Years active: 2004–present
- Label: Sonar Music
- Website: matteozingales.com

Matteo Zingales (born 28 October 1980) is an Australian film music composer who has won the AACTA Award for Best Original Score for a Feature Film for two years running. In 2013, he shared the award with Jono Ma (of rock band Jagwar Ma) for Best Score for Not Suitable for Children (2012), and in 2012, Zingales, Michael Lira and Andrew Lancaster shared the award for Best Score for The Hunter (2011).

== Biography ==
Matteo Zingales was born on 28 October 1980 in Rome and raised in Sydney. He graduated in 2004 from the Australian Film, Television and Radio School with a Masters in Screen Composition. Zingales has cited Thomas Newman, John Barry and Arvo Pärt as his most important musical influences. "When I was nine," he recalls, "I adored movies. I wanted to be a director and then I realised what actually moved me was the music. I just used to sit down at the piano and write".

He has worked across a variety of music platforms. His television credits include the music for over 200 episodes of the series, All Saints (2004–2009), broadcast in fifteen countries, and for all 22 episodes of the first series of Winners & Losers (2011), broadcast in four countries.

He has composed the music for feature films, including collaborating on The Hunter (2011), which starred Willem Dafoe and Sam Neill, and on Not Suitable for Children (2012), which was directed by Peter Templeman and starred Ryan Kwanten (True Blood) and Sarah Snook; for television mini-series including the ABC's Devil's Dust (2012), one of the six parts of the ABC's Redfern Now (2012), and SBS's Better Man (2013); and for short films, such as Blue Poles (2004), starring Sam Worthington. His documentary credits include Lachlan Macquarie: The Father of Australia (2011) for BBC Scotland and The History Channel; and he has composed music for television advertisements.

In February 2008 the Sydney Morning Herald's Mark Chipperfield included Zingales as one of Australia's top thirteen "new talents breaking ground in their chosen fields".

He is a co-founder and director of Sonar Music, the leading Australian music composers' collective.

== Awards and nominations ==
=== ARIA Music Awards ===
The ARIA Music Awards is an annual awards ceremony that recognises excellence, innovation, and achievement across all genres of Australian music.

Year	Nominee / work	Award	Result	Ref.
2020	Mystery Road (with Antony Partos)	Best Original Soundtrack, Cast or Show Album	Nominated	
2022	A Fire Inside	Best Original Soundtrack, Cast or Show Album	Nominated	

=== APRA - Screen Music Awards ===
Year	Nominee / work	Award	Result	Ref.
2007	All Saints: TV Series	Best Music for a Television Series	Nominated	
2011	Lachlan Macquarie: The Father of Australia	Best Music for a Documentary	Won	
2012	Dripping in Chocolate	Best Music for a Mini-Series or Telemovie	Nominated	
2016	DNA Nation	Best Music for a Mini-Series or Telemovie	Nominated	
2016	99 Homes	Feature Film Score of the Year (shared with Antony Partos)	Won	
2018	Harrow	Best Television Theme	Won	
2018	Harrow	Best Music for a Television Series or Serial	Nominated	
2018	Mystery Road	Best Music for a Mini-Series or Telemovie (shared with Antony Partos)	Won	
2018	Wake In Fright	Best Music for a Mini-Series or Telemovie (shared with Antony Partos)	Nominated	
2018	Fahrenheit 451	Feature Film Score of the Year (shared with Antony Partos)	Nominated	
2018	Fahrenheit 451	Best Soundtrack Album (shared with Antony Partos)	Nominated	
2019	Tidelands	Best Music for a Television Series or Serial	Nominated	
2020	Total Control	Best Original Song Composed for the Screen	Nominated	
2020	Machine	Best Music for a Documentary	Won	
2023	In Limbo	Best Music for a Mini-Series or Telemovie	Nominated	
2026	Sunny Nights	Best Music for a Television Comedy	Nominated	

=== AACTA Awards ===
Year	Nominee / work	Award	Result	Ref.
2012	The Hunter	Best Original Music Score (shared with Michael Lira and Andrew Lancaster)	Won	
2013	Not Suitable for Children	Best Original Score (shared with Jono Ma of rock band Jagwar Ma)	Won	
2016	The Kettering Incident	Best Original Music Score in Television (shared with Max Lyandvert)	Won	
2017	Wake In Fright	Best Original Music Score in Television (shared with Antony Partos)	Won	
2018	Mystery Road	Best Original Music Score in Television (shared with Antony Partos)	Won	
2020	Machine	Best Original Score in A Documentary	Nominated	
2020	Wild Things	Best Sound in a Documentary	Nominated	
2022	A Fire Inside	Best Original Score in a Documentary	Nominated	
2024	In Limbo	Best Original Music Score in Television	Nominated	

=== Film Critics Circle of Australia Award ===
Year	Nominee / work	Award	Result	Ref.
2012	The Hunter	Best Music Score for a Feature Film (shared with Michael Lira and Andrew Lancaster)	Nominated	
2013	Not Suitable for Children	Best Music Score (shared with Jono Ma)	Nominated	
