= Muriel's Wedding =

1994 film by P. J. Hogan

- Australian theatrical release poster
- Directed by: P. J. Hogan
- Written by: P. J. Hogan
- Produced by: Lynda House; Jocelyn Moorhouse
- Starring: Toni Collette; Bill Hunter; Rachel Griffiths
- Cinematography: Martin McGrath
- Edited by: Jill Bilcock
- Music by: Peter Best
- Production companies: CiBy Sales Limited; Film Victoria; House & Moorhouse Films
- Distributed by: Roadshow Film Distributors (Australia); CiBy 2000 (France)
- Release dates: 30 May 1994 (Cannes); 29 September 1994 (Australia); 26 October 1994 (France)
- Running time: 101 minutes
- Countries: Australia; France
- Language: English
- Budget: $9 million
- Box office: $15.5 million

Muriel's Wedding is a 1994 comedy-drama film written and directed by P. J. Hogan. Starring Toni Collette, Bill Hunter and Rachel Griffiths (in her film debut), the film focuses on the socially awkward Muriel whose ambition is to have a glamorous wedding and improve her personal life by moving from her dead-end hometown, the fictional Porpoise Spit, to Sydney.

A co-production between Australia and France, the film premiered at the 1994 Cannes Film Festival and was released in Australia on 29 September 1994 and in France on 26 October 1994. It received positive reviews and earned multiple award nominations, including a Golden Globe Award nomination for Best Actress in a Motion Picture – Musical or Comedy (Collette).

== Plot ==
Socially awkward young Muriel Heslop is the target of ridicule by her shallow and snobbish friends, Tania, Cheryl, Janine and Nicole. A devoted ABBA fan, she often daydreams of a glamorous wedding to get her away from the dead-end beach town of Porpoise Spit and her domineering father Bill, a corrupt politician who constantly belittles his entire family. Muriel attends the wedding of Tania and Chook, during which she sees him and Nicole (one of Tania's bridesmaids) secretly having sexual intercourse. Wedding guest Dianne, a department store detective and Chook's cousin, calls the police on Muriel for stealing the dress she is wearing, and they publicly escort Muriel out of the reception.

Soon afterwards, Bill's rumoured mistress, Deidre Chambers, recruits Muriel into her multi-level marketing business, and Muriel's "friends" throw her out of their group after declaring she is not invited to their upcoming island holiday. Muriel's mother, Betty, signs a blank cheque for Muriel to buy products for the cosmetics business, but she instead uses it to withdraw $12,000 and follow her former friends to the island. There, Muriel runs into Rhonda Epinstall, an old high school acquaintance, and they quickly strike up a friendship, cemented when Rhonda gleefully tells Tania about Nicole and Chook's affair.

Returning home, Muriel is confronted by Betty regarding the stolen money. She impulsively flees to Sydney, sharing a flat with Rhonda, taking a job at a video shop and changing her name to Mariel. She is asked out on a date by Brice. During their awkward sexual encounter, Rhonda suddenly falls down, unable to feel her legs. While at the hospital, Muriel calls home and learns her father is being investigated for taking bribes. Rhonda has a cancerous tumour in her spine and undergoes multiple operations, eventually leaving her paraplegic. Muriel promises Rhonda to look after her and never let her return to Porpoise Spit. She also uses Rhonda's health crisis to obtain pampered service at numerous bridal shops, trying on wedding dresses and taking photographs to indulge her wedding obsession. When Rhonda confronts Muriel, she finally confesses to her fixation on a dream wedding, and their friendship becomes strained.

Desperate, Muriel agrees to a sham marriage to South African swimmer David Van Arkle so he can join the Australian team in the upcoming Olympics; she is paid $10,000 by David's parents for her help. At Muriel's elaborate wedding in Sydney, Tania, Cheryl and Janine are her bridesmaids; an embittered Rhonda refuses to be one. Bill openly treats Deidre as his date, and Betty arrives late to the wedding as she is unable to afford a plane ticket; Muriel does not notice her at the wedding. Rhonda moves back to her mother's home in Porpoise Spit, unable to live in Sydney without help. After the wedding, David makes his lack of interest in Muriel clear to her.

In Porpoise Spit, an increasingly distraught Betty unwittingly shoplifts a pair of sandals she tries on, and Dianne calls the police. Bill arranges to have the charges dropped, but when Betty pleads with Bill for help, he announces his intention to divorce her and marry Deidre. Betty is later found dead by her daughter Joanie. It is announced that Betty had a heart attack, but Joanie informs Muriel that it was suicide. At her mother's funeral, David comforts Muriel, and they finally consummate their marriage. Determined to stop lying, she tells him she can no longer remain married to him as neither of them are in love, and they part amicably. Bill asks Muriel to help raise her siblings, as Deidre is less likely to marry him with the children in tow, and he has also lost his job on city council. Muriel stands up to him, giving him $5,000 of her wedding money and telling him she will repay the rest of the stolen amount when she gets a job in Sydney. She also demands that her father stop verbally abusing her siblings.

Muriel goes to Rhonda's house, where Muriel's former tormentors are visiting, and offers to take her back to Sydney. Rhonda accepts and lambasts the other women, much to their shock and anger. The best friends head to the airport, happily leaving Porpoise Spit behind.

== Cast ==
- Toni Collette as Muriel Heslop
- Bill Hunter as Bill Heslop
- Rachel Griffiths as Rhonda Epinstall
- Sophie Lee as Tania Degano
- Rosalind Hammond as Cheryl
- Belinda Jarrett as Janine
- Pippa Grandison as Nicole
- Jeanie Drynan as Betty Heslop
- Daniel Wyllie as Perry Heslop
- Gabby Millgate as Joanie Heslop
- Gennie Nevinson as Deidre Chambers
- Matt Day as Brice Nobes
- Chris Haywood as Ken Blundell
- Daniel Lapaine as David Van Arkle
- Susan Prior as girl at wedding
- Cecily Polson as Tania's mother
- Rob Steele as Higgins
- Geneviève Picot as Dianne, the store detective
- Heather Mitchell as bridal manageress #1
- Penne Hackforth-Jones as bridal manageress #2
- Annie Byron as Berris, Rhonda's mother
- Vincent Ball as priest

== Production ==
The film used Tweed Heads as the locale for Porpoise Spit, although the scene of Muriel and Rhonda leaving Porpoise Spit was filmed in its adjoining "Twin Town", Coolangatta. Other filming locations included Moreton Island, Darlinghurst, the Gold Coast, Elanora, Tugun, Parramatta, Kensington, Surfers Paradise and Sydney.

For the role of Muriel, Toni Collette gained 18 kg (40 lb) in seven weeks.

The film was inspired by P. J. Hogan's family.

== Soundtrack ==
The music of ABBA forms the backbone of the film's soundtrack. Songwriters Björn Ulvaeus and Benny Andersson allowed their use in the film and permitted "Dancing Queen" to be adapted as an orchestral piece. Additional ABBA songs included are "Waterloo", "Fernando", and "I Do, I Do, I Do, I Do, I Do".

ABBA only gave permission for their music to be included in the film two weeks before shooting commenced; the filmmakers were considering changing Muriel's favourite band to the Village People.

Also included in the soundtrack are "Sugar Baby Love" by the Rubettes, "The Tide Is High" by Blondie, "I Go to Rio" by Peter Allen, and "Happy Together" by the Turtles.

== Release ==
Muriel's Wedding premiered in the Directors' Fortnight section of the Cannes Film Festival in May 1994. The film screened at the 1994 Toronto International Film Festival in September. It was released theatrically in Australia on 29 September 1994 by Roadshow Film Distributors, a month after another Australian film, The Adventures of Priscilla, Queen of the Desert. In France, it was released as simply Muriel on 26 October 1994. The film was also shown at the Welsh International Film Festival in Aberystwyth in November 1994, five months before its general UK release. In 1995, the film received a U.S. theatrical release by Miramax, who during the 1990s distributed several other Australian films in the U.S., such as The Castle, Cosi and Strictly Ballroom.

=== Home media ===
Miramax released the film on VHS in the United States in 1995. After its initial Australian VHS release, the film was released on DVD in the country in approximately late 2004, via Roadshow Entertainment.

In 2010, the film's U.S. distributor Miramax was sold by The Walt Disney Company (their owners since 1993). That same year, Miramax was taken over by private equity firm Filmyard Holdings, who sold Miramax to Qatari company beIN Media Group in March 2016. In April 2020, ViacomCBS (now known as Paramount Skydance) acquired the rights to Miramax's film library, after buying a 49% stake in the studio from beIN. This deal included the U.S. rights to Muriel's Wedding, and since April 2020, the film has been distributed in the U.S. by Paramount Pictures. Paramount Home Entertainment reissued the film on DVD in the U.S. in 2021, along with many other Miramax titles they had acquired. Paramount also made it available on their subscription streaming service Paramount+, as well as on their free streaming service Pluto TV.

== Reception ==
=== Box office ===
Muriel's Wedding grossed AU$2.2 million in its opening week in Australia (September 1994) from 72 screens, at that time the third biggest opening for an Australian film behind two films starring Paul Hogan (no relation to the director of Muriel's Wedding) – Crocodile Dundee II (1988) and Lightning Jack (1994). It went on to gross AU$15.8 million (equivalent to AU$34.7 million in 2023) at the box office in Australia.

It earned US$245,000 on 14 screens in its opening weekend in the US (March 1995) and eventually grossed US$15.1 million in the United States and Canada.

=== Critical response ===
Muriel's Wedding received positive reviews from critics. On the review aggregator website Rotten Tomatoes, the film holds an approval rating of 82% based on 50 reviews, with an average rating of 7.2/10. The website's critics consensus reads, "Heartfelt and quirky, though at times broad, Muriel's Wedding mixes awkward comedy, oddball Australian characters, and a nostalgia-heavy soundtrack." Metacritic, which uses a weighted average, assigned the film a score of 63 out of 100, based on 14 critics, indicating "generally favorable" reviews.

Roger Ebert of the Chicago Sun-Times stated the film "is merciless in its portrait of provincial society, and yet has a huge affection for its misfit survivors...has a lot of big and little laughs in it, but also a melancholy undercurrent, which reveals itself toward the end of the film in a series of surprises and unexpected developments...The film's good heart keeps it from ever making fun of Muriel, although there are moments that must have been tempting."

Peter Stack of the San Francisco Chronicle wrote, "With such recent hits as Strictly Ballroom and Priscilla, Queen of the Desert, Australia seems to be cornering the market for odd but delightful comedies laced with substance and romance. The latest, Muriel's Wedding, is another bright, occasionally brilliant, example... the movie is much meatier than its larky comic sheen leads you to think at first...There's poignant drama in this brash, sometimes overstated film, and Muriel's transformation is truly touching."

Peter Travers of Rolling Stone called it "exuberantly funny...a crowd pleaser that spices a tired formula with genuine feeling... In the final scenes, when Hogan dares to let his humour turn edgy, Collette's performance gains in force, and Muriel's Wedding becomes a date you want to keep."

=== Accolades ===
Award	Category	Recipient(s)	Result	Ref.
APRA Music Awards	Best Film Score	Peter Best	Won	
Australian Film Institute Awards	Best Film	Lynda House and Jocelyn Moorhouse	Won	
Australian Film Institute Awards	Best Direction	P. J. Hogan	Nominated	
Australian Film Institute Awards	Best Original Screenplay	P. J. Hogan	Nominated	
Australian Film Institute Awards	Best Actress	Toni Collette	Won	
Australian Film Institute Awards	Best Supporting Actor	Bill Hunter	Nominated	
Australian Film Institute Awards	Best Supporting Actress	Jeanie Drynan	Nominated	
Australian Film Institute Awards	Best Supporting Actress	Rachel Griffiths	Won	
Australian Film Institute Awards	Best Editing	Jill Bilcock	Nominated	
Australian Film Institute Awards	Best Sound	David Lee, Glenn Newnham, Livia Ruzic and Roger Savage	Won	
Australian Film Institute Awards	Best Production Design	Paddy Reardon	Nominated	
Australian Film Institute Awards	Best Costume Design	Terry Ryan	Nominated	
British Academy Film Awards	Best Original Screenplay	P. J. Hogan	Nominated	
Golden Globe Awards	Best Actress in a Motion Picture – Musical or Comedy	Toni Collette	Nominated	
Chicago Film Critics Association Awards	Most Promising Actress	Toni Collette	Nominated	
Chicago International Film Festival	Mercedes-Benz Audience Award	P. J. Hogan	Won	
Film Critics Circle of Australia Awards	Best Actor – Female	Toni Collette	Won	
Film Critics Circle of Australia Awards	Best Supporting Actor – Female	Rachel Griffiths	Won	
Writers Guild of America Awards	Best Screenplay Written Directly for the Screen	P. J. Hogan	Nominated	

== Stage adaptation ==
In September 2016, it was announced that Sydney Theatre Company would produce a musical adaptation of Muriel's Wedding. Muriel's Wedding the Musical incorporates songs by ABBA as well as original music by Kate Miller-Heidke and Keir Nuttall. P. J. Hogan wrote the musical's book, Simon Phillips directed, and Gabriela Tylesova designed the set and costumes. The musical ran at the Roslyn Packer Theatre from 6 November 2017 through 27 January 2018.

== See also ==
- Cinema of Australia
- Sydney in film
- Four Weddings and a Funeral
