= Marcus Gillezeau =

- Occupations: Author, Producer
- Years active: 1995-Present

Marcus Gillezeau is an Australian television and movie writer and producer. In 2013 he won the AACTA Award (Australian Academy of Cinema Television Arts), Best Feature Documentary for Storm Surfers 3D and in 2009 the International Digital Emmy Award for the drama Scorched.
