= Burning Man (film) =

2011 film

- Film poster
- Directed by: Jonathan Teplitzky
- Written by: Jonathan Teplitzky
- Produced by: Andy Paterson; Jonathan Teplitzky
- Starring: Matthew Goode; Bojana Novakovic
- Cinematography: Garry Phillips
- Edited by: Martin Connor
- Music by: Lisa Gerrard
- Distributed by: Paramount Pictures; Transmission Films
- Release dates: 10 September 2011 (Toronto); 17 November 2011 (Australia)
- Running time: 109 minutes
- Country: Australia
- Language: English

Burning Man is a 2011 Australian drama film written and directed by Jonathan Teplitzky.

== Plot ==
Burning Man tells the story of Tom (Matthew Goode), a British chef in a Bondi restaurant, who seems to have chosen to disobey his boss, and his actions are tolerated by everyone around him. As Tom descends into darkness from a car crash in his Volkswagen, pieces of a different story start to emerge. Every woman around him tries, in different ways, to help Tom put himself back together.

== Cast ==
- Matthew Goode as Tom
- Bojana Novakovic as Sarah
- Essie Davis as Karen
- Rachel Griffiths as Miriam
- Kerry Fox as Sally
- Anthony Hayes as Brian
- Jack Heanly as Oscar
- Kate Beahan as Lesley
- Gia Carides as Carol
- Marta Dusseldorp as Lisa
- Robyn Malcolm as Kathryn
- Garry McDonald as Dr Burgess
- Daniel Wyllie as Darren

== Reception ==
On review aggregator website Rotten Tomatoes, the film holds an approval rating of 72% based on 25 reviews, with an average rating of 7.5/10.

Fiona Williams of SBS awarded the film four stars out of five, observing that the film is an "experiential kaleidoscope of sex, love, and the numbing nihilism that accompanies a traumatic event." She also notes that "Burning Man manages to bring energy, originality and depth to a storyline that is itself something of a trope: ‘The Cancer Film’."

== Accolades ==
Award	Category	Subject	Result
AACTA Award (2nd)	Best Film	Andy Paterson	Nominated
AACTA Award (2nd)	Best Film	Jonathan Teplitzky	Nominated
AACTA Award (2nd)	Best Direction	Jonathan Teplitzky	Nominated
AACTA Award (2nd)	Best Original Screenplay	Jonathan Teplitzky	Nominated
AACTA Award (2nd)	Best Actor	Matthew Goode	Nominated
AACTA Award (2nd)	Best Supporting Actress	Essie Davis	Nominated
AACTA Award (2nd)	Best Cinematography	Garry Phillips	Nominated
AACTA Award (2nd)	Best Editing	Martin Connor	Nominated
AACTA Award (2nd)	Best Sound	David Lee	Nominated
AACTA Award (2nd)	Best Sound	Gethin Creagh	Nominated
AACTA Award (2nd)	Best Sound	Andrew Plain	Nominated
AACTA Award (2nd)	Best Production Design	Steven Jones-Evans	Nominated
AACTA Award (2nd)	Best Costume Design	Lizzy Gardiner	Nominated
Australian Film Critics Association Awards	Best Actor	Matthew Goode	Nominated
Australian Film Critics Association Awards	Best Editing	Martin Connor	Won
ASE Award	Best Editing in a Feature Film	Martin Connor	Won
Australian Screen Sound Guild Award	Best Sound Mixing	David Lee	Nominated
Australian Screen Sound Guild Award	Best Sound Mixing	Gethin Creagh	Nominated
Australian Screen Sound Guild Award	Best Sound Mixing	Andrew Plain	Nominated
AWGIE Award	Feature Film - Original	Jonathan Teplitzky	Won
Film Critics Circle of Australia Awards	Best Film	Andy Paterson	Nominated
Film Critics Circle of Australia Awards	Best Film	Jonathan Teplitzky	Nominated
Film Critics Circle of Australia Awards	Best Director	Jonathan Teplitzky	Nominated
Film Critics Circle of Australia Awards	Best Screenplay	Jonathan Teplitzky	Nominated
Film Critics Circle of Australia Awards	Best Actor	Matthew Goode	Nominated
Film Critics Circle of Australia Awards	Best Actress	Bojana Novakovic	Nominated
Film Critics Circle of Australia Awards	Best Supporting Actress	Essie Davis	Nominated
Film Critics Circle of Australia Awards	Best Young Actor	Jack Heanly	Nominated
Film Critics Circle of Australia Awards	Best Cinematography	Garry Phillips	Nominated
Film Critics Circle of Australia Awards	Best Editor	Martin Connor	Won
Film Critics Circle of Australia Awards	Best Music Score	Lisa Gerrard	Won
Australian Screen Music Award	Feature Film Score of the Year	Lisa Gerrard	Won

== See also ==
- Cinema of Australia
