= P. J. Hogan =

Australian filmmaker (born 1962)

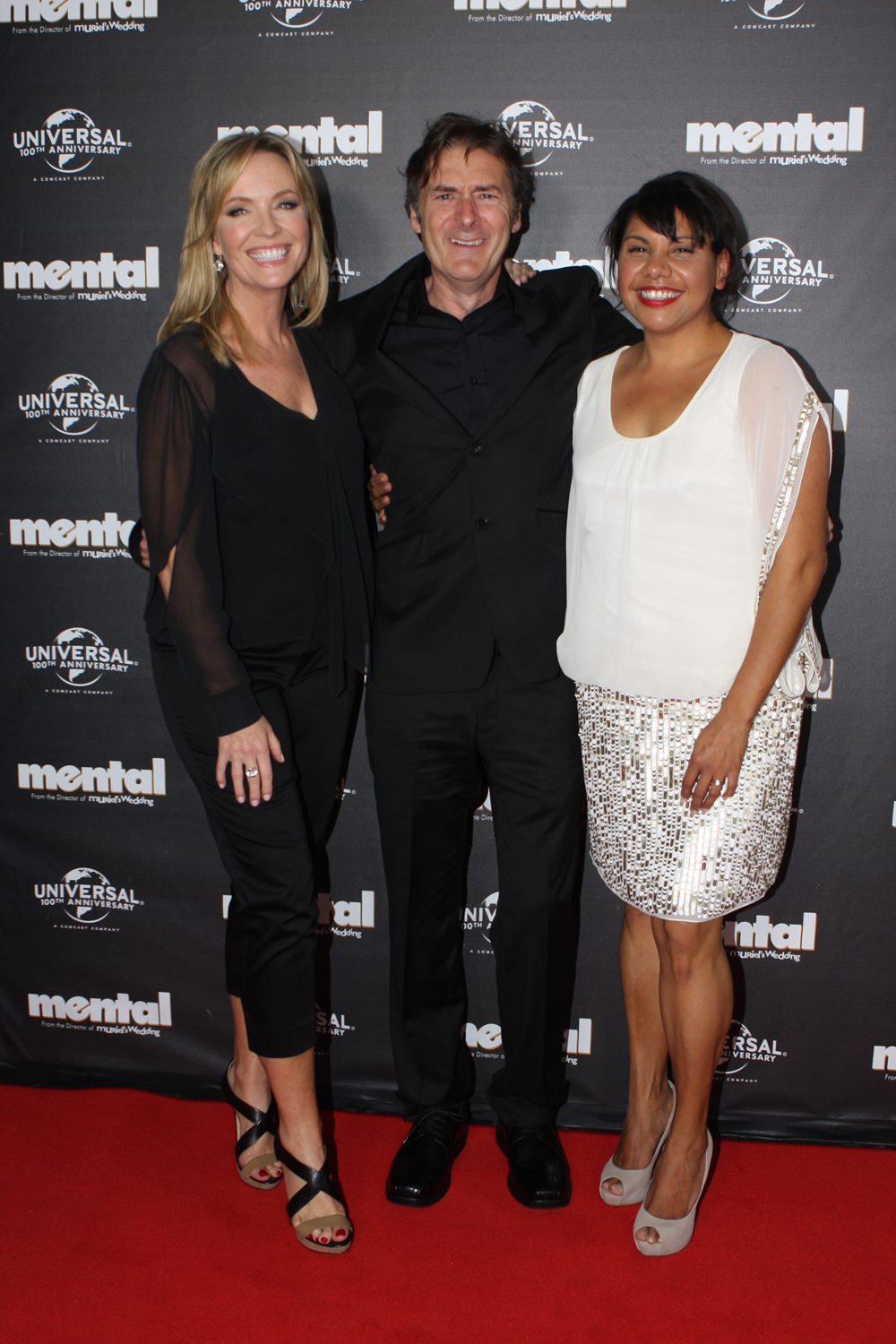
- Rebecca Gibney, P. J. Hogan, Deborah Mailman in 2012
- Born: Paul John Hogan; 30 November 1962 (age 63); Brisbane, Queensland, Australia
- Occupations: Film director; screenwriter
- Years active: 1984–present
- Notable work: Muriel's Wedding; My Best Friend's Wedding; Peter Pan; Confessions of a Shopaholic
- Spouse: Jocelyn Moorhouse
- Children: 4

Paul John Hogan (born 30 November 1962) is an Australian film director and screenwriter. He is best known for directing the films Muriel's Wedding (1994), My Best Friend's Wedding (1997), Peter Pan (2003) and Confessions of a Shopaholic (2009).

== Early life ==
Hogan was born in Brisbane, Queensland. As a teenager, he lived on the North Coast of New South Wales and attended Mt St Patrick's College. He was said to have had a difficult time in high school as he was a victim of bullying. His film Mental (2012) is based upon his difficult adolescent years.

== Career ==
Hogan's directorial debut was the short film Getting Wet, made in 1984. This film won him an AACTA Award for Best Short Fiction Film. He then went on to direct minor films. In 1991, he was the assistant director of the Australian film Proof. In the early 1990s, he wrote for several television series, including The Flying Doctors in 1991 and for Lift Off in 1992.

Hogan's first big hit was the 1994 Australian film Muriel's Wedding, which helped launch the careers of actors Toni Collette and Rachel Griffiths. He both wrote and directed this film, and was nominated for Best Director at the AACTA Awards. The success of the film also led him to be chosen by Julia Roberts to direct his 1997 American debut My Best Friend's Wedding, which also starred Cameron Diaz and Dermot Mulroney.

Hogan followed this with the comedy Unconditional Love (which was filmed in 1999 but not released until 2002), and 2003's big budget adaptation of Peter Pan, starring Jason Isaacs as Captain Hook, Jeremy Sumpter as Peter Pan and Rachel Hurd-Wood as Wendy. Despite positive reviews, the 2003 Peter Pan film failed at the box office. The following year he directed a pilot for a remake of the cult soap opera Dark Shadows, which was not picked up for broadcast, and created the story for the 2008 musical film The American Mall. He then directed Confessions of a Shopaholic (starring Isla Fisher), an adaptation of the novel The Secret Dreamworld of a Shopaholic. In 1999, both Hogan and Moorhouse through Hogan Moorhouse Pictures signed a first look deal with Sony.

In 2012, he reunited with Muriel star Collette for the comedy Mental.

== Personal life ==
Hogan is married to film director Jocelyn Moorhouse. They have four children, two of whom are autistic.

In April 2019, Moorhouse spoke on the ABC Television program Australian Story about how their relationship had developed and how having the children had affected their personal and professional lives, including a move back to Australia from the US.

== Filmography ==
=== Film ===
Year	Title	Director	Writer	Notes
1984	Getting Wet	Yes	Yes	Short film
1986	The Humpty Dumpty Man	Yes	Yes	
1988	To Make a Killing	No	Yes	
1994	Muriel's Wedding	Yes	Yes	Nominated- BAFTA Award for Best Original Screenplay; Nominated- AACTA Award for Best Original Screenplay
1997	My Best Friend's Wedding	Yes	No	
2002	Unconditional Love	Yes	Yes	
2003	Peter Pan	Yes	Yes	
2009	Confessions of a Shopaholic	Yes	No	
2012	Mental	Yes	Yes	Nominated- AACTA Award for Best Original Screenplay
2015	The Dressmaker	No	Yes	Also executive producer

=== Television ===
Year	Title	Director	Writer	Notes
1987	The Bartons	No	Yes	Episode "The Siege of the Bartons"
1990	The Flying Doctors	No	Yes	Episode "Poets' Corner"
1990	Skirts	No	Yes	
1991	The Miraculous Mellops	No	Yes	2 episodes
1992	Lift Off	No	Yes	
1993	Seven Deadly Sins	Yes	No	Episode "Sloth"
2004	Dark Shadows	Yes	No	Unaired pilot
2008	The American Mall	No	Yes	TV movie
