= Better Than Sex (film) =

2000 Australian film

- DVD cover
- Directed by: Jonathan Teplitzky
- Written by: Jonathan Teplitzky
- Produced by: Frank Cox; Bruna Papandrea
- Starring: David Wenham; Susie Porter; Catherine McClements
- Cinematography: Garry Phillips
- Music by: David Hirschfelder
- Production company: Fireworks Pictures
- Distributed by: Samuel Goldwyn Films
- Release date: 2000
- Running time: 95 minutes
- Countries: Australia; France
- Language: English

Better Than Sex is 2000 Australian film from director Jonathan Teplitzky starring David Wenham and Susie Porter. It is a romantic comedy of sorts, revolving around two people who have a one-night stand and start to question whether they want more.

== Plot ==
Josh and Cin meet at a party in Sydney three days before he is due to return to London. Originally planning just to spend the night, Josh decides to stay at her flat until he has to leave for the airport. The two gradually grow closer, feeling a strong connection. However, when Cin's friend Sam comes over and flirts with Josh, they end up quarreling and he leaves. Once Josh cools down he relents and returns to Cin. Having both agreed that they were just having fun, he leaves to catch his plane the next day. At the last minute, he decides not to go and returns to Cin's flat only to find that she has followed him to London, not knowing he missed the flight. Josh can not find a flight for three days, but once he reaches London they are reunited and Cin decides to move there to be with him.

== Cast ==
Actor	Role
David Wenham	Josh
Susie Porter	Cin
Catherine McClements	Sam
Kris McQuade	Taxi Driver
Simon Bossell	Tim
Imelda Corcoran	Carole

== Awards ==
Won:

- 2001 Australasian Performing Right Association: Best Film Score (David Hirschfelder)

Nominated:

- 2001 Australian Recording Industry Association award for Best Original Soundtrack Album (David Hirschfelder)
- 2001 Australian Film Institute Awards: Best Film (Bruna Papandrea, Frank Cox), Best Achievement in Direction (Jonathan Teplitzky), Best Original Screenplay (Jonathan Teplitzky), Best Performance by an Actor in a Lead Role (David Wenham), Best Performance by an Actress in a Lead Role (Susie Porter), Best Performance by an Actress in a Supporting Role (Kris McQuade), Best Original Music Score (David Hirschfelder), Best Achievement in Production Design (Tara Kamath)
- 2001 Film Critics Circle of Australia Awards: Best Actor – Male (David Wenham), Best Actor – Female (Susie Porter), Best Screenplay – Original (Jonathan Teplitzky)

== Music ==
- "The Word" – David Hirschfelder and David Hobson
- "Open All Night" and "Mr Milk" – You Am I
- "Stay This Way" – Kylie Minogue
- "Gets Me Up" – Sneak

== Box office ==
Better Than Sex grossed $1,266,018 at the box office in Australia.
