= Neil McGregor (film director) =

Australian born film maker

- Born: Brisbane, Queensland
- Occupation: Entrepreneur & Film-maker

Neil McGregor is an Australian entrepreneur and film-maker who founded the creative company Glass Engine and worked extensively in Australia, Canada and The United States of America.

== Biography ==
McGregor graduated from the Australian Film, Television & Radio School and Griffith University. While studying, his first short film was shortlisted for Tropfest Film Festival and later opened the Brisbane International Film Festival and one of the youngest people to be inducted into the Australian Directors Guild. His works include documentary, high-end television commercials and narrative feature-length films and series.

His directorial debut feature-length film The Little Things (2010) was funded by Screen Australia, Screen Queensland and received strong reviews winning numerous festival awards. Following the success of The Little Things, McGregor relocated to Vancouver, Canada where he was added to the directing roster for TV commercials across North America. While developing a slate of projects, he also worked in Locations and Assistant Director Departments where he informally shadowed several directors on various films including Godzilla and Deadpool (film). His details were leaked on wikileaks from working as a crew member on the Seth Rogan political satire film The Interview. He secured a literary agent before moving back to Australia. On arrival, McGregor commenced as vice president, Locations & Production Attraction at Screen Queensland.

At Screen Queensland, McGregor played an integral role in helping attract significant in production investment exceeding $335 Million Dollars into Australia with films such as Aquaman, Thor: Ragnarok, Pacific Rim: Uprising, Godzilla Vs Kong, The Shallows, Danger Close and Netflix's first Australian television series Tidelands. With increased production activity in Queensland, McGregor conceptualised a design and oversaw the build process of what would become Screen Queensland Studios the third largest studio company is Australia. Paramount Pictures was the first production to use the studio and is a legacy for the future of the Australian screen industry.

Upon departing from Screen Queensland, McGregor directed and produced two feature-length documentaries Ramblin' Racer (2023) distributed by Madmen Entertainment and Amazon Prime and Growing Happiness (2024).

Also in 2024, McGregor announced the release of a feature-length documentary 'HINCKLEY' about John Hinckley Jr. on its own streaming platform called 'Launchpad'.

McGregor founded Glass Engine, a hybrid creative company to revolutionize the ecosystem of screen and entertainment industry.

== Filmography ==
- Hinckley (2024) Exec. Producer, Producer, Director
- Growing Happiness (2024) Exec. Producer, Producer, Director
- Ramblin'Racer (2023) Producer, Director
- The Gap (2016) Director
- The Little Things (2010) Director
