= Jonathan Teplitzky =

Australian writer and film director

Jonathan Teplitzky is an Australian writer and film director who has directed the movies Better Than Sex (2000), Gettin' Square (2003), Burning Man (2011), The Railway Man (2013), and Churchill (2017). Teplitzky has also directed two episodes of the web series A Series of Unfortunate Events.

Teplitzky won a BAFTA TV award in 1993 for his work on the BBC documentary A Vampire’s Life about writer Anne Rice.

Teplitzky also directed episodes five and six of the second series of Broadchurch, which began airing in January 2015.

In 1993, Teplitzky directed Donna De Lory's "Just a Dream" music video for her debut album. The same year, he also directed Chesney Hawkes' "Missing You Already" music video.
