= List of Australian films of 2006 =

Title	Director	Cast	Genre	Notes
2:37	Murali K. Thalluri	Frank Sweet, Teresa Palmer, Sam Harris	Drama	
48 Shades	Daniel Lapaine	Richard Wilson, Emma Lung, Robin McLeavy	Comedy/drama	
The Book of Revelation	Ana Kokkinos	Tom Long, Greta Scacchi, Colin Friels	Thriller	
BoyTown	Kevin Carlin	Glenn Robbins, Mick Molloy, Bob Franklin	Comedy	
Candy	Neil Armfield	Abbie Cornish, Heath Ledger, Geoffrey Rush	Drama	
The Caterpillar Wish	Sandra Sciberras	Victoria Thaine, Susie Porter, Philip Quast	Drama	
Darklovestory	Jon Hewitt	Belinda McClory, Aaron Pedersen, Chris Baz	Drama	
Demonsamongus	Stuart Simpson	Scott Brennan, Roz Hammond, Chris Gay	Horror	
The Desealer	James Clayden	Luke Ryan, Meg White	Thriller	
Elephant Tales	Mario Andreacchio	Jean-François Balmer, Richard Bohringer	Adventure	
Em4Jay	Alkinos Tsilimidos	Laura Gordon, Nick Barkla, David Campbell	Drama	
Emulsion	Jonathan Ogilvie	Tyler Coppin, Fayssal Bazzi, Matthew Le Nevez	Drama	
Five Moments of Infidelity	Kate Gorman	Ben Anderson, Joshua Cameron	Drama	
Footy Legends	Khoa Do	Anh Do, Angus Sampson, Emma Lung	Comedy	
Gene-X	Martin Simpson	Ayse Tezel, Patrick Magee, Peter Astridge	Thriller	
Global Haywire	Bruce Petty	Tariq Ali, Noam Chomsky, Robert Fisk	Documentary	
God on My Side	Andrew Denton	Andrew Denton	Documentary	
Happy Feet	George Miller	Elijah Wood, Brittany Murphy, Robin Williams	Animation	
Hunt Angels	Alec Morgan	Ben Mendelsohn, Victoria Hill, Eloise Oxer	Drama	
Irresistible	Ann Turner	Sam Neill, Susan Sarandon, Emily Blunt	Thriller	
Jindabyne	Ray Lawrence	Laura Linney, Gabriel Byrne, John Howard	Drama	
Jupiter Love	Michael André	Michael André, Nikka Kalashnikova	Thriller	
Kenny	Clayton Jacobson	Shane Jacobson, Eve von Bibra, Ronald Jacobson	Mockumentary	
Kokoda	Alister Grierson	Simon Stone, Jack Finsterer, Tom Budge	War	
Last Train to Freo	Jeremy Sims	Steve Le Marquand, Gigi Edgley, Tom Budge	Thriller	
Like Minds	Gregory J. Read	Toni Collette, Eddie Redmayne, Tom Sturridge	Horror	
Lords of the Underworld				
Lost and Found	David Blake	Brett Climo, Nicholas Hope, Rebecca Gibney	Drama	
Macbeth	Geoffrey Wright	Sam Worthington, Victoria Hill, Lachy Hulme	Thriller	
Nancy Nancy	Timothy Spanos	Tim Burns, Michael Burkett, Matt Thomas	Comedy	Winner Best Comedy Feature at the Atlanta Underground Film Festival
Rampage	George Gittoes		Documentary	
Restraint	David Deenan	Stephen Moyer, Travis Fimmel, Teresa Palmer	Thriller	
The Society Murders	Brendan Maher	Georgie Parker, Alex Dimitriades, Matthew Le Nevez	Drama	
Solo	Morgan O'Neill	Colin Friels, Bojana Novakovic, Vince Colosimo	Crime	
Suburban Mayhem	Paul Goldman	Emily Barclay, Michael Dorman, Anthony Hayes	Comedy/drama	Screened at the 2006 Cannes Film Festival
Sweet FA	Christian McCarty, Karl Paustian	Matthew Okine, Michael Ackery	Comedy	
Tan Lines	Ed Aldridge	Jack Baxter, Jed Clarke, Curtis Dickson	Romance	
Ten Canoes	Rolf de Heer	Jamie Gulpilil, Crusoe Kurddal, Richard Birrinbirrin	Adventure	AACTA Award for Best Film
Unfolding Florence	Gillian Armstrong		Documentary	
Voodoo Lagoo	Nick Cohen	Ashley Hamilton, John Noble	Horror	
Wango & Maloy	Kristian Laslett	Marc Kay, Terry Kyle, Annette De La Force	Comedy	
Watch Me	Melanie Ansley	Celeste Barry, Glen Hancox, George Ivanoff	Horror	
Welcome Stranger	Jason Turley	Suzanne Barr, Randall Berger, John Brumpton	Drama	
When Darkness Falls	Rohan Spong	Natalie Bassingthwaighte, Elizabeth Sandy, Sarah Bollenberg	Drama	
When Evil Reigns	Alix Jackson, Luke C. Jackson	Nick Beugelaar, Tim Clark, Josh Ellis	Horror	
Wil	Jeremy Weinstein	Matthew Dyktynski, Max Gillies	Comedy	

== See also ==
- 2006 in Australia
- 2006 in Australian television
- List of 2006 box office number-one films in Australia
