= The Choice (novel) =

2007 novel by Nicholas Sparks

- First edition
- Author: Nicholas Sparks
- Language: English
- Genre: Novel
- Publisher: Grand Central Publishing
- Publication date: September 24, 2007
- Publication place: United States
- Media type: Print (hardback)
- Pages: 288 pp (first edition, hardback)
- ISBN: 978-0-446-57992-6 (first edition, hardback)
- OCLC: 154698685
- Dewey Decimal: 813/.54 22
- LC Class: PS3569.P363 C47 2007

The Choice is a 2007 novel written by Nicholas Sparks. It was first published on September 24, 2007 by Grand Central Publishing.

== Plot ==
Part 1: Travis Parker and Gabby Holland set off into an interesting journey of life as neighbors. Travis Parker is a happy man with wonderful friends, a great occupation and an enviable life. He thinks his life is already full of joy and happiness – then Gabby Holland moves into the house next door. What blossoms is an emotional and inspiring love story. It is a story about overcoming barriers to be with your loved ones. It is about pure and intense romantic love, trust, strength, and the reality that all choice is a cheap illusion.

Part 2: Gabby suffers an accident, and Travis visits her in the hospital, where she is comatose. The doctors say she probably will never wake up. Travis is forced to make the choice between taking Gabby off life support or to sending her to long term care, knowing that she may never wake up. He decides to take his chances and move her to long term care. Three months later, Gabby wakes up from her coma and moves back into their house.

== Film adaptation ==
A film adaptation was produced by Lionsgate and released in 2016. Benjamin Walker plays Travis, and Teresa Palmer plays Gabby.
