= Rachel Seiffert =

British novelist and short story writer (born 1971)

Rachel Seiffert (born 1971) is a British novelist and short story writer.

== Biography ==
She was born in 1971 in Oxford to German and Australian parents, and was brought up bilingually. She lives in London.

== Publications and awards ==
Seiffert has published six works of fiction to date.

Her first novel, The Dark Room (2001), was shortlisted for the Booker Prize and the Guardian First Book Award in 2001. In 2002, it won the LA Times Prize for First Fiction and a Betty Trask Award for writers under the age of 35. The 2012 movie Lore by writer-director Cate Shortland is based on The Dark Room.

In 2004, she published Field Study, a collection of short stories, one of which received an award from International PEN.

Her second novel, Afterwards (2007), was long-listed for the Orange Prize for Fiction the same year.

She published her third novel, The Walk Home, in 2014. It is set in Glasgow, and follows a family torn apart. Like its predecessor, it was long-listed for the Orange Prize for Fiction.

A Boy in Winter (2017) is a novel set during the 1941 German invasion of the Ukraine during Operation Barbarossa.

Once the Deed Is Done (2025) is a novel about the aftermath of WWII. It was shortlisted for the Walter Scott Prize in 2026.

Seiffert was named as one of Granta magazine's 20 Best of Young British Novelists, for writers under the age of 40, in 2003. Her short story "Field Study" was included in the subsequent collection.

In 2011, she received the E. M. Forster Award from the American Academy of Arts and Letters.

Her books have been translated into ten languages.

Seiffert was elected a Fellow of the Royal Society of Literature (FRSL) in 2025.

== Subjects ==
Seiffert's subject is the individual in history: how political and economic upheavals impact on ordinary lives. Her characters have included the 12-year-old daughter of an SS officer in 1945, a Polish seasonal worker on a German asparagus farm after the fall of the Berlin Wall, and a London painter and decorator who killed a civilian as a 19-year-old squaddie with the British Army in Northern Ireland during the Troubles.

== Bibliography ==
=== Novels ===
- The Dark Room (2001)
- Afterwards (2007)
- The Walk Home (2014)
- A Boy in Winter (2017)
- Once the Deed Is Done (2025)

=== Short Story Collections ===
- Field Study: Stories (2004)
