= Theresa Park =

American producer and literary agent

- Park at the 2026 Toronto International Film Festival.

Theresa Park (born 1967) is a New York-based literary agent. and producer. She is the founder of Per Capita Productions, developing television shows at Apple and Amazon Studios, as well as feature films with A24, Universal, Cinereach, Anonymous Content, FilmNation, and other studio and producing partners.

A co-founder of Park & Fine Literary and Media, she has been a literary agent since 1994. Her clients include authors such as Nicholas Sparks, Debbie Macomber, Janice Y.K. Lee, Taylor Jenkins Reid, Cecelia Ahern, and Deborah Harkness, among others.

She grew up principally in Germany, Lebanon, and Austria, but attended UC Santa Cruz and Harvard Law School in the United States after graduating from the American International School in Vienna, Austria. She is fluent in German and can speak French.

== Career ==
After Harvard Law School, Park worked as a corporate attorney at Cooley Godward in Silicon Valley before leaving to join Sanford J. Greenburger Associates as a literary agent in 1994. In 2005, she left to begin her own literary agency, Park Literary and Media.

In 2019, Theresa Park, along with Celeste Fine, a leading non-fiction agent, launched Park & Fine Literary and Media. Park & Fine is a literary agency based around having a team approach to clients.

Park is the president of Per Capita Productions. She produced BONES AND ALL, director Luca Guadagnino’s first U.S.-set feature film, starring Timothée Chalamet, Taylor Russell and Mark Rylance, which debuted at the 2022 Venice Film Festival and went into wide release from MGM in November 2022. The film was nominated for the 2023 Independent Spirit Awards for Best Feature Film, Best Lead Performance and Best Supporting Performance. It received two acting nominations from the Gotham Awards and won the Silver Lion at Venice for Best Director, and the film’s star, Taylor Russell, won Best New Talent.

After Yang, the film Park produced together with Cinereach for A24, premiered worldwide in Un Certain Regard at the 2021 Cannes Film Festival. It had its US debut at the 2022 Sundance Film Festival, winning the Alfred P. Sloan Prize, and subsequently premiered in theaters and on Showtime. Other awards recognitions include Independent Spirit Award 2023 nominations for Best Screenplay and Best Director: along with two Gotham Awards nominations, for Best Screenplay and Best Actor. Directed and adapted by writer-director Kogonada, from Alexander Weinstein’s short story “Saying Goodbye to Yang,” the film stars Colin Farrell, Jodie Turner-Smith and Justin Min.

Park was an executive producer of ROAR for Apple TV+, an anthology series of darkly comic feminist fables, starring Nicole Kidman, Cynthia Erivo, Merritt Weaver and Alison Brie, as well as Expats, the Amazon Prime TV series based on Janice Y.K. Lee’s New York Times bestselling novel, adapted for television by Alice Bell and Lulu Wang and directed by Wang.

Per Capita has a number of film and television projects in various stages of development, including the film adaptation of Nicholas Sparks’s #1 New York Times bestselling novel, The Return, which Park will produce alongside Sparks and Elizabeth Cantillon, who optioned it for her MRC Film label; an animated children’s series at Apple+ based on the bestselling children’s series The Sisters Grimm, and a television series based on Joel Kostman’s memoir Keys to the City. Park is also slated to produce alongside Anonymous Content for Universal Studios three films based on recent and forthcoming Nicholas Sparks novels, including The Wish (Hachette, 2021).

Park was a producer on the feature films The Best of Me (Relativity, 2014), The Longest Ride (Fox 2000, 2015) and The Choice (Lionsgate, 2016), all based on novels by Nicholas Sparks. She executive produced the telefilm Deliverance Creek (Lifetime, 2014).
