= The Dark Room (Seiffert novel) =

2001 novel by British writer Rachel Seiffert

- First edition (publ. Heinemann)
- Author: Rachel Seiffert
- Language: English
- Publication date: 2001

The Dark Room (2001) is a novel by British writer Rachel Seiffert.

== Summary ==
The novel is composed of three unrelated novellas set in pre- and post-World War II Germany.

=== Helmut ===
In 1920s Berlin a boy is born with a slight birth defect of the arm. When he graduates school he becomes an apprentice at a photographer's workshop while at the same time taking an interest in the comings and goings of trains. Despite unintentionally witnessing and photographing a violent roundup of Romani people he remains ignorant of the significance of what he has seen and dreams of joining the Wehrmacht.

=== Lore ===
In Bavaria in 1945, after Germany surrenders, Lore, the young daughter of a Nazi officer, is asked by her mother to go with her younger siblings to her grandmother's house in Hamburg after both her parents are sent to prisoner-of-war camps. Making her way across the countryside she is joined by a young man named Thomas who bears a numbered tattoo on his arm and papers that identify him as a survivor of Buchenwald.

One of Lore's brother's is murdered by Soviet soldiers during the trek, but Lore, the rest of her siblings, and Thomas, eventually manage to locate her grandmother. Lore and her siblings feel unable to explain Thomas to their grandmother and keep him secret, frequently visiting him in the rubble he is squatting in. Shortly after Lore asks Thomas about images she has seen in the newspaper of Nazi concentration camps he runs away and Lore's younger brother reveals that the identity papers he had were stolen from a dead Jewish man, possibly to protect himself from being sent to a Prisoner-of-war camp like Lore's parents.

=== Micha ===
In 1997 a German man is shocked when his grandmother casually reveals that his grandfather was a member of the Waffen-SS. He sets about trying to find out about his grandfather's crimes and traces him to a small town in Belarus where he repeatedly interviews a man who lived through that time. As he struggles to reconcile the image of the grandfather he loved as a perpetrator of the Holocaust his obsessive search begins to tear his family apart.

== Awards ==
Awards for The Dark Room
Year	Award	Result	Ref.
2001	Booker Prize	Shortlist	
2001	Guardian First Book Award	Shortlist	
2001	Art Seidenbaum Award for First Fiction	Winner	
2002	Betty Trask Award	Winner	

== Adaptations ==
Australian director Cate Shortland adapted the middle section into the film Lore in 2012.
