= Kojo (company) =

Australian film production and entertainment company

Kojo Company Pty Ltd
- Trade name: Kojo Productions
- Type: Subsidiary
- Industry: Entertainment
- Founded: 1991
- Founder: Kent Smith; John Chataway
- Headquarters: Adelaide, South Australia, Australia
- Number of locations: 2 (2011)
- Key people: Stephen Lord (CEO); Kent Smith (executive producer)
- Services: Film production; Television production; Sports; Lifestyle
- Owner: PMY Entertainment
- Members: 35 (2015)
- Number of employees: 60 (2019)
- Parent: PMY Group
- Divisions: Kojo Productions; Kojo Sports; Kojo Theater; Oasis Post and Spirit Films
- Website: Kojo's official page

Kojo, stylised KOJO, is an Australian entertainment company based in Adelaide, South Australia. Founded in 1991 and formerly known as Kojo Pictures, Kojo is especially known for its film production studios, known as KOJO Studios, but also covers sport, live events, and advertising. It absorbed and renamed its two divisions, Oasis Post and Spirit Films, in 2011. Its parent company since September 2024 is the technology company PMY Group.

== History ==
Kojo was founded in 1991 by cinematographer and producer Kent Smith with his business partner, cinematographer, director, and writer John Chataway (who died in 2010).

Kojo's film production arm was first registered as Kojo Productions Pty Ltd in 2000, with a change of name to Kojo Studios Pty Ltd in November 2020. It has also been referred to as "Kojo Pictures".

In 2005, Smith took the Kojo Group into feature film production, starting with the psychological drama 2:37, which was directed by Adelaide director Murali K. Thalluri, making him "an overnight success story", and was an Official Selection at the 2006 Cannes Film Festival. Two Kojo-produced films were released in 2009: Closed for Winter and Beautiful, both shot in Adelaide, and both premiering at the Adelaide Film Festival before their cinema releases. The 2010 film The Tree was also an Official Selection and the closing film at 2010 Cannes Film Festival. Smith produced single-handedly on Beautiful, but said that the norm for Kojo would be to form collaborations with other filmmakers, including international producers. The company also became a distributor, and had acquired local rights to 30 films by March 2009. Most of these were telemovies or released on DVD, but four were released in cinemas, including 4 Months, 3 Weeks and 2 Days, which won the 2007 Palme d'Or.

Oasis Post and Spirit Films were divisions of the Kojo Group. Oasis Post, which specialised in post-production work, developed a reputation for skill in Digital intermediate (DI) processing. In 2005 the company produced the feature film Wolf Creek, using HD on 35 mm movie film, before switching to digital cameras. In 2008, they delivered five feature films, in both digital and traditional film formats. Marty Pepper was senior colourist at this point.

In October 2010, Spirit Films and Oasis Post created a DVD and Blu-Ray release for Adelaide band The Hilltop Hoods, called Parade of the Dead. Shot around Adelaide Gaol by cinematographer Aaron Gully using 15 cameras of various types, the film comprises a zombie apocalypse inter-cut with footage of a live concert by the Hoods at the Gaol. Designed for release just before Halloween, the film was only the second made by an Australian group on Blu-Ray (the other being AC/DC). Richard Coburn of Oasis Post directed, edited, and designed the film.

In 2011, the company was split into four core business units: Content, Post-Production, Digital, and Events. Barbara Devlin was appointed as head of Content, to expand Kojo's offerings into multi-platform, digital content. Spirit Films and Oasis Post were absorbed into Content, with Oasis Post head of film and television, Dale Roberts, appointed director of content and post-production. Marty Pepper became director of creative strategy, senior producer Steve Barrett would lead Digital, and Daniel Tippett continued to lead the Events division, which was based in Melbourne.

In March 2013, the company was expanding across Australia, and David Minear and Maryanne Milazzo were appointed to the board. At that time, Steve Wise was chair, Dale Roberts was CEO, and other board members were Marty Pepper and Kent Smith.

In June 2013, Kojo announced a multi-million dollar investment deal with American company Main Street Films, to collaborate on an upcoming feature film that would be a co-production between Kojo and South Australian writer/director Murali K. Thalluri from M2E, with South African company Enigma Pictures as the co-producer. It would be Kojo's seventh film as producers, and the 29th film delivered through its post-production unit in Adelaide. It would also be first film made under an official co-production treaty signed in 2010 between Australia and South Africa. The film, titled One, was described as "a racially fuelled post-apocalyptic adventure as seen through the eyes of a 26-year old girl", and was set to be filmed in South Africa and produced by Kent Smith. Main Street announced cast members at Cannes Film Festival in 2014, but in 2019 it was reported as never being made. As of November 2025, One is still listed on IMDb as "in development".

In May 2023, Kojo announced the opening of a new post-production studio in the Melbourne suburb of Richmond, Victoria.

In September 2024, Kojo merged with PMY Group. Stephen Lord was CEO of KOJO at the time, while Dale Roberts was managing director. PMY provided technology services in 15 countries, and has a client base of more than 1,000 venues, major events, and rights holders.

In November 2024 Kojo acquired public relations consultancy O'Rourke PR (OPR), led by Rebecca O'Rourke.

== Description ==
The company provides services in several types of entertainment, including sports, live experiences, and screen-based entertainment. It is headquartered in the Adelaide inner-city suburb of Kent Town, South Australia, and has post-production and visual effects (VFX) studios in Adelaide and Melbourne, and production offices in Sydney, Perth, and Brisbane. Kojo provides services in development, film and television production, post-production, and VFX, and provides services in Australia, New Zealand, and internationally. Its New Zealand office is in Wellington, and it also has an office in London, England.

Its production arm is known as KOJO Studios.

=== People ===
In July 2023, Jamie McClurg was announced as the new chair of KOJO's board, replacing Steve Wise, who had been chair for 19 years. Wise would remain a director on the company board.

As of 2025 Stephen Lord is CEO of the KOJO group of companies.

Dale Roberts, then general manager of Kojo, was appointed to the board of Ausfilm in September 2021 for a three-year term. He was reappointed for another term in September 2025.

== Sport and other entertainment ==
Kojo has worked with major sporting organisations, including Australian Football League (AFL), Cricket Australia, and FIFA. It has also been commissioned by BMW and Netflix to do advertising.

== Filmography ==
Films and TV series for which Kojo Studios has provided production, post-production, or VFX services include:

- Wolf Creek (film and TV series) (2005–present)
- The Lucky One (2012)
- The Babadook (2014)
- Hotel Mumbai (2018)
- The Nightingale (2018)
- I Am Mother (2019)
- First Day (2020; children's TV series)
- Mortal Kombat (2021)
- Ticket to Paradise (2022; VFX for Universal Studios)
- Talk To Me (2022)
- Master Gardener (2022)
- A Beginner's Guide to Grief (2022 TV series)
- The Pope's Exorcist (2023)
- Gold Diggers (2023)
- Territory (2024 TV series)
- Woody Woodpecker Goes to Camp (2024)
- Bring Her Back (2025)
- Jimpa (2025)
