= List of 2006 box office number-one films in Australia =

This is a list of films which placed number-one at the box office in Australia during 2006. Amounts are in Australian dollars, which is the type of currency in Australia. Also included are the positions at the box office other films opened at. Quite a number of these are films from the previous year due to normal Australian film distribution delays. The number a film opens at does not necessarily denote its highest placement at the box office (for example, Garfield: A Tail of Two Kitties debuted at #13 and later peaked at #3), but is intended as an indication and a guide to what theatrically released films opened and when.

== Number-one films ==
| † | This implies the highest-grossing movie of the year. |

| # | Week ending | Film | Box office | Openings |
|---|---|---|---|---|
| 1 | 4 January 2006 | The Chronicles of Narnia: The Lion, the Witch and the Wardrobe | $11,055,672 | Chicken Little (#4), The Family Stone (#10) |
| 2 | 11 January 2006 | The Chronicles of Narnia: The Lion, the Witch and the Wardrobe | $6,201,264 | Rumor Has It... (#3), Valiant (#10) |
| 3 | 18 January 2006 | The Chronicles of Narnia: The Lion, the Witch and the Wardrobe | $3,812,678 | Nanny McPhee (#2), The Producers (#5) |
| 4 | 25 January 2006 | Memoirs of a Geisha | $4,046,193 | Underworld: Evolution (#2), Get Rich or Die Tryin' (#7) |
| 5 | 1 February 2006 | Big Momma's House 2 | $2,667,816 | Munich (#2), Brokeback Mountain (#4), Keeping Mum (#6) |
| 6 | 8 February 2006 | Walk the Line | $2,988,087 | North Country (#9), The Fog (#10) |
| 7 | 15 February 2006 | Walk the Line | $2,497,720 | Jarhead (#2), Just Friends (#3), Casanova (#9) |
| 8 | 22 February 2006 | Date Movie | $2,287,969 | Syriana (#3), Lord of War (#7), Goal! (#9) |
| 9 | 1 March 2006 | Walk the Line | $1,533,100 | Hostel (#3), Derailed (#6), Capote (#10), Imagine Me & You (#13) |
| 10 | 8 March 2006 | Firewall | $1,749,356 | Match Point (#4), Kinky Boots (#8), Rent (#19) |
| 11 | 15 March 2006 | The Pink Panther | $1,863,559 | A History of Violence (#4), The Shaggy Dog (#7), Zathura: A Space Adventure (#13), Hustle & Flow (#14), Dreamer (#18) |
| 12 | 22 March 2006 | When a Stranger Calls | $1,524,237 | Æon Flux (#2), Tristan & Isolde (#8), Yours, Mine and Ours (#10), The Long Weekend (#15) |
| 13 | 29 March 2006 | When a Stranger Calls | $956,675 | Cry_Wolf (#7), The Weather Man (#13) |
| 14 | 5 April 2006 | Inside Man | $2,549,495 | V for Vendetta (#2), Basic Instinct 2 (#6), March of the Penguins (#8) |
| 15 | 12 April 2006 | Ice Age 2: The Meltdown | $7,328,412 | She's the Man (#2), The World's Fastest Indian (#4) |
| 16 | 19 April 2006 | Ice Age 2: The Meltdown | $7,593,260 | Scary Movie 4 (#2), Failure to Launch (#3), Water (#12), The Squid and the Whale (#14), Tsotsi (#16), How Much Do You Love Me? (#17) |
| 17 | 26 April 2006 | Ice Age 2: The Meltdown | $5,125,407 | Eight Below (#3), Kokoda (#8), The Hills Have Eyes (#11) |
| 18 | 3 May 2006 | Ice Age 2: The Meltdown | $2,349,829 | Final Destination 3 (#3), American Dreamz (#5), The Ringer (#10), The White Countess (#17) |
| 19 | 10 May 2006 | Mission: Impossible III | $4,923,176 | Hidden (#13), Dave Chappelle's Block Party (#15), The New World (#20) |
| 20 | 17 May 2006 | Mission: Impossible III | $2,958,204 | The Benchwarmers (#2), Two for the Money (#7), Where the Truth Lies (#17), On a Clear Day (#20) |
| 21 | 24 May 2006 | The Da Vinci Code | $11,450,544 | Slither (#5) |
| 22 | 31 May 2006 | X-Men: The Last Stand | $8,332,425 | Take the Lead (#3), Candy (#6), Separate Lies (#7), Fanaa (#9), The Three Burials of Melquiades Estrada (#10), Last Holiday (#12), Warren Miller's Higher Ground (#17) |
| 23 | 7 June 2006 | X-Men: The Last Stand | $3,822,006 | Poseidon (#3), RV: Runaway Vacation (#5), The Omen (#6) |
| 24 | 14 June 2006 | Cars | $6,315,434 | The Break-Up (#2), The Caterpillar Wish (#12), Colour Me Kubrick (#15) |
| 25 | 21 June 2006 | The Fast and the Furious: Tokyo Drift | $4,074,273 | Stick It (#6), Just My Luck (#10), Oliver Twist (#17) |
| 26 | 28 June 2006 | Click | $5,933,014 | Over the Hedge (#2), Wah-Wah (#9), Krrish (#17) |
| 27 | 5 July 2006 | Superman Returns | $7,119,955 | Ten Canoes (#9), Tristram Shandy: A Cock and Bull Story (#15) |
| 28 | 12 July 2006 | Pirates of the Caribbean: Dead Man's Chest | $15,866,404 | River Queen (#14) |
| 29 | 19 July 2006 | Pirates of the Caribbean: Dead Man's Chest | $9,185,006 | Little Man (#2), Sione's Wedding (#11), Beyond the Sea (#13), Hard Candy (#15) |
| 30 | 26 July 2006 | Pirates of the Caribbean: Dead Man's Chest | $4,646,384 | My Super Ex-Girlfriend (#2), Jindabyne (#3), 16 Blocks (#7), The White Masai (#14) |
| 31 | 2 August 2006 | You, Me and Dupree | $3,282,179 | The Lake House (#3), The Libertine (#16) |
| 32 | 9 August 2006 | You, Me and Dupree | $2,277,847 | Hoodwinked (#3), The Sentinel (#5), Confetti (#8), Footy Legends (#9), 49 Up (#20) |
| 33 | 16 August 2006 | Miami Vice | $3,265,994 | Kabhi Alvida Naa Kehna (#8), Brick (#14) |
| 34 | 23 August 2006 | Miami Vice | $1,624,571 | United 93 (#5), Kenny (#7), Curious George (#9), 2:37 (#11), Chaos (#13) |
| 35 | 30 August 2006 | Snakes on a Plane | $1,344,096 | Fearless (#2), Thank You for Smoking (#6), Unfolding Florence: The Many Lives of Florence Broadhurst (#17) |
| 36 | 6 September 2006 | Silent Hill | $1,000,109 | Clerks II (#5), Friends with Money (#7), Lage Raho Munna Bhai (#16), 48 Shades (#18), Man About Town (#19) |
| 37 | 13 September 2006 | John Tucker Must Die | $1,338,434 | Lady in the Water (#2), DOA: Dead or Alive (#4), Garfield: A Tail of Two Kitties (#13), Stormbreaker (#17) |
| 38 | 20 September 2006 | Monster House | $1,926,092 | Nacho Libre (#2), An Inconvenient Truth (#4), Material Girls (#6), The Wild (#13), The Ant Bully (#18) |
| 39 | 27 September 2006 | Talladega Nights: The Ballad of Ricky Bobby | $2,539,063 | Barnyard (#5), The Wind That Shakes the Barley (#14) |
| 40 | 4 October 2006 | The Devil Wears Prada | $5,449,620 | Step Up (#2), Beerfest (#15), Aquamarine (#17) |
| 41 | 11 October 2006 | The Devil Wears Prada | $3,733,016 | World Trade Center (#5), A Prairie Home Companion (#15) |
| 42 | 18 October 2006 | The Departed | $3,372,431 | Little Miss Sunshine (#3), The Covenant (#8), Irresistible (#16) |
| 43 | 25 October 2006 | The Departed | $2,398,491 | BoyTown (#3), Children of Men (#4), Crank (#6), Don (#15) |
| 44 | 1 November 2006 | The Departed | $1,801,538 | The Grudge 2 (#2), Trust the Man (#10), Mrs. Palfrey at the Claremont (#13), Suburban Mayhem (#14), Fast Food Nation (#15), The Nightmare Before Christmas 3D (#16) |
| 45 | 8 November 2006 | Saw III | $3,395,863 | Flags of Our Fathers (#3), God on My Side (#19) |
| 46 | 15 November 2006 | Jackass Number Two | $3,026,280 | A Good Year (#3), The Wrong Man (#5), Shortbus (#17) |
| 47 | 22 November 2006 | The Prestige | $2,055,078 | The Santa Clause 3: The Escape Clause (#3), The Texas Chainsaw Massacre: The Beginning (#10) |
| 48 | 29 November 2006 | Borat: Cultural Learnings of America for Make Benefit Glorious Nation of Kazakhstan | $6,841,840 | Deck the Halls (#8), The Descent (#9), Catch a Fire (#10), Dhoom 2 (#12), The Black Dahlia (#13) |
| 49 | 6 December 2006 | Borat: Cultural Learnings of America for Make Benefit Glorious Nation of Kazakhstan | $4,087,398 | Open Season (#2), The Guardian (#4), Unaccompanied Minors (#8), The Nativity Story (#15), A Scanner Darkly (#18) |
| 50 | 13 December 2006 | Casino Royale | $9,375,310 | Charlotte's Web (#3) |
| 51 | 20 December 2006 | Casino Royale | $5,474,998 | Eragon (#2) |
| 52 | 27 December 2006 | Happy Feet † | $4,481,329 | Night at the Museum (#3), Flushed Away (#4), The Holiday (#6), The Queen (#9), Babel (#12), Volver (#13), Marie Antoinette (#14), The Valet (#16) |

== See also ==
- List of Australian films – Australian films by year
- 2006 in film
