= University Senior College =

Coordinates: 34°55′18″S 138°36′22″E

Location
- Gate 12, Kintore Ave, University of Adelaide; North Terrace; University of Adelaide; Adelaide; South Australia 5005

Information
- Type: Private Independent Co-educational Secondary International
- Motto: Be ready for University
- Established: 2002
- Principal: Anita Zocchi
- Faculty: 45
- Enrolment: ~430
- Website: http://www.usc.adelaide.edu.au

University Senior College (or USC) is a coeducational independent high school, offering secondary education for students in Years 10, 11 and 12, located on the city campus of Adelaide University, South Australia. The stated goal of the school is to provide students with "a senior school education that thoroughly prepares them to successfully enter tertiary studies."

University Senior College is currently the leading feeder school to universities in South Australia (in particular Adelaide University), with more than 90% of USC graduates being offered their first preference at University.

== Overview ==
University Senior College opened its doors in 2002, designed to provide secondary education suited to senior high school students intending to move on to study at university; USC attracts students from across the Adelaide metropolitan area as well as international students from around the world. The defining feature of USC is its relationship with its parent institution, Adelaide University; in addition to sharing a campus, students at the school also share facilities such as the library, drama theatre and cafeteria. USC has no school uniform policy, in keeping with the intended adult learning environment. Additionally, the school is situated within the Adelaide CBD, a short walking distance from shops, public transport and other conveniences.

== Curriculum ==
All students at University Senior College are expected to study subjects which will achieve a Tertiary Entrance Ranking in the South Australian Certificate of Education. USC offers a broad curriculum which covers all subjects necessary to qualify for SACE, including any prerequisites needed for the individual student's desired university course.

== Scholarships ==
University Senior College offers limited scholarships for students entering Years 10, 11 and 12 ranging in value from 25% to 50% remission of tuition fees. Academic scholarships are granted based entirely on the results of an examination which is held every June for the next year's scholarship applicants.

== Notable alumni ==
- Hugh Sheridan – actor
- Murali K. Thalluri – director
- Jake Haberfield – cricketer
- Osama Malik – soccer player
- Marielle Smith – senator
