= Trophy Kids (2011 film) =

2011 film

- Directed by: Josh Sugarman
- Written by: Josh Sugarman; Brandon Yankowitz
- Produced by: Brandon Yankowitz
- Starring: Ryan Eggold; David Gallagher; Tahyna Tozzi; Nathan Lee Graham; Tibor Feldman; Tania Raymonde; David Thornton; Chris Beetem; Adam Grupper; Eleanor Reissa; Isiah Whitlock, Jr.
- Music by: Bobby Tahouri
- Release date: June 5, 2011 (Dances with Films)
- Country: United States
- Language: English

Trophy Kids is a 2011 film directed by Josh Sugarman, produced by Brandon Yankowitz, and written by the pair. Trophy Kids stars Ryan Eggold, David Gallagher, Tahyna Tozzi, Nathan Lee Graham, Tibor Feldman, Tania Raymonde, David Thornton, Chris Beetem, Adam Grupper, Eleanor Reissa, and Isiah Whitlock, Jr.

The film's title refers to the generation of Americans also known as "Millennials," who grew up receiving trophies and other praise just for participating and not necessarily for excelling. They were rewarded to improve their self-esteem. As a result, trophy kids feel confident and accomplished, but the coddling has led them to feel entitled with often unrealistic expectations about their jobs and life in general.

== Plot ==
To win the celebrity and self-made wealth he craves, an aimless, twenty-something Manhattan playboy devises a film based on his party-boy, club-going lifestyle, and hires a self-destructive aspiring playwright to ghost the feature script. As the mismatched pair struggles to complete the script and get a handle on their misdirected lives, they reveal the sometimes comedic, sometimes tragic behaviors of 'Generation Y'- a generation taught to believe each was incomparably special and messianically gifted. Though they begin to vie for the affections of the same girl, and their chance at success and happiness threatens to crumble, they ultimately each find their own, unique life truths.

== Production ==
Trophy Kids was filmed in New York City and wrapped principal photography in early July 2009.
