= Berlin Syndrome (film) =

2017 film by Cate Shortland

- Theatrical release poster
- Directed by: Cate Shortland
- Screenplay by: Shaun Grant
- Based on: Berlin Syndrome by Melanie Joosten
- Produced by: Polly Staniford
- Starring: Teresa Palmer; Max Riemelt
- Cinematography: Germain McMicking
- Edited by: Jack Hutchings
- Music by: Bryony Marks
- Production companies: Screen Australia; Aquarius Films; Film Victoria; Memento Films International; Entertainment One; DDP Studios; Fulcrum Media Finance; Photoplay Films
- Distributed by: Entertainment One (Australia); Netflix (France)
- Release dates: January 20, 2017 (Sundance); April 20, 2017 (Australia); August 27, 2017 (France)
- Running time: 116 minutes
- Countries: Australia; France
- Languages: English; German
- Budget: $5.5 million
- Box office: $788,191

Berlin Syndrome is a 2017 psychological horror thriller film directed by Cate Shortland from a screenplay by Shaun Grant, based on the 2012 novel of the same name by Melanie Joosten. The film follows a young Australian photographer (Teresa Palmer) who travels to Germany, where she meets an attractive young English teacher (Max Riemelt). Waking up after a stormy night of passion with him, the photographer is suddenly taken hostage by her would-be lover.

Berlin Syndrome had its world premiere at the Sundance Film Festival on 20 January 2017 and was released in Australia on 20 April 2017 by Entertainment One. The film received positive reviews from critics, with some praising the atmosphere, and the performances of Palmer and Riemelt.

== Plot ==
In Berlin, Australian backpacker and photographer Clare meets local English teacher Andi. They spend the day together, then have sex in Andi's apartment. The following morning, Clare finds herself locked in. Upon Andi's return, he says he forgot to leave a key, and she spends another night after they go out dancing.

The next day, Clare finds he has written meine (German for 'mine') on her shoulder and taken the SIM card from her phone. Attempting to smash her way out the windows, she finds they are double-paned and reinforced with plexiglass. It dawns on her that the other apartments in the building are abandoned. When Andi returns, Clare begs him to let her go but he begins restraining her to the bed while he is at work, leaving her to soil herself.

At dinner with his father, Erich, Andi tells him he is dating Clare. Erich asks what happened to his previous girlfriend Natalie, and Andi says she returned to Canada. That night, Andi lets Clare shower and she finds a clump of long blonde hair in the drain. Andi texts Clare's mother posing as her, informing her she is well.

Clare finds a screwdriver under the sofa and, when Andi comes home, she stabs him in the hand and flees the apartment. Andi catches her in the courtyard downstairs, breaking her fingers in the door and carries her back inside. Andi's student Franka shows up and flirts with him, but when she briefly spots a disheveled Clare, Andi says she is his girlfriend and threatens to report her behaviour, causing her to leave.

Andi's bizarre behaviour continues, including taking pictures of Clare in disturbing positions, cutting off pieces of her hair, and retreating to a locked room. Depressed on finding his father has died, he spends a week at his father's house, leaving a freezing Clare in the apartment with the power off. When he returns, she comforts him and they have sex. As the holidays approach, Clare's mood seems to brighten; she learns to play the accordion and bakes treats for Andi. He gifts her his father's dog, but days later becomes jealous of their bond and kills it.

Andi takes Clare outside for the first time in months, to a forest where he plans to kill her with an axe. They are interrupted by two young boys, one of whom has injured his leg. Clare quietly begs the other to get help but he doesn't understand English. On New Year's Eve, Andi attends a work party and Clare breaks into the locked room and finds photo albums of a blonde woman. A man outside shines a flashlight at the windows; she screams for help and he attempts to rescue her, but Andi returns and kills him with a crowbar. Andi has Clare help him wrap the body in plastic, saying it's her fault he is dead. He burns the body in a dumpster in the courtyard.

More time passes and Clare miserably spends her days in the flat with Andi. Reading a newspaper report about Clare being missing, Andi plans to kill her by dehydration after he shuts the water off. When she sees him grading student's workbooks, she hides a photograph in Franka's. Franka finds the picture of Clare bound and gagged. She excuses herself to use the toilet and cycles away from school and drops the picture on the classroom floor, which is passed around by the other students. When Andi is handed the photo by a student he realises what is happening, he leaves the school in a panic. He arrives home to find the courtyard door open and the locked box of Clare's possessions open and empty. Franka has ridden her bike to the apartment and found Clare just before Andi arrives. Clare lures Andi in, hiding on the floor above his apartment. When he goes into the apartment, she calls his name and, before he can react, she locks him inside, leaving him to suffer the fate he planned for her. Clare rescues Franka who hides in a cupboard in the apartment above.

Clare rides free in a cab through Berlin's streets finally free of Andi.

== Cast ==
- Teresa Palmer as Clare Havel, a photographer
- Max Riemelt as Andi Werner, an English teacher
- Matthias Habich as Erich Werner, Andi's father
- Emma Bading as Franka Hummels, student of Andi Werner
- Elmira Bahrami as Jana
- Christoph Franken as Peter
- Lara Marie Müller as Silke
- Viktor Baschmakov as Benni
- Mascha Wolf as Mascha
- Matthias Russel as Jakob
- Lucie Aron as Elodie Zadikan
- Morgane Ferru as Jesie Lamarque
- Thuso Lekwape as Billy Dharma
- Nassim Avat as Aron Hurwitz

== Production ==
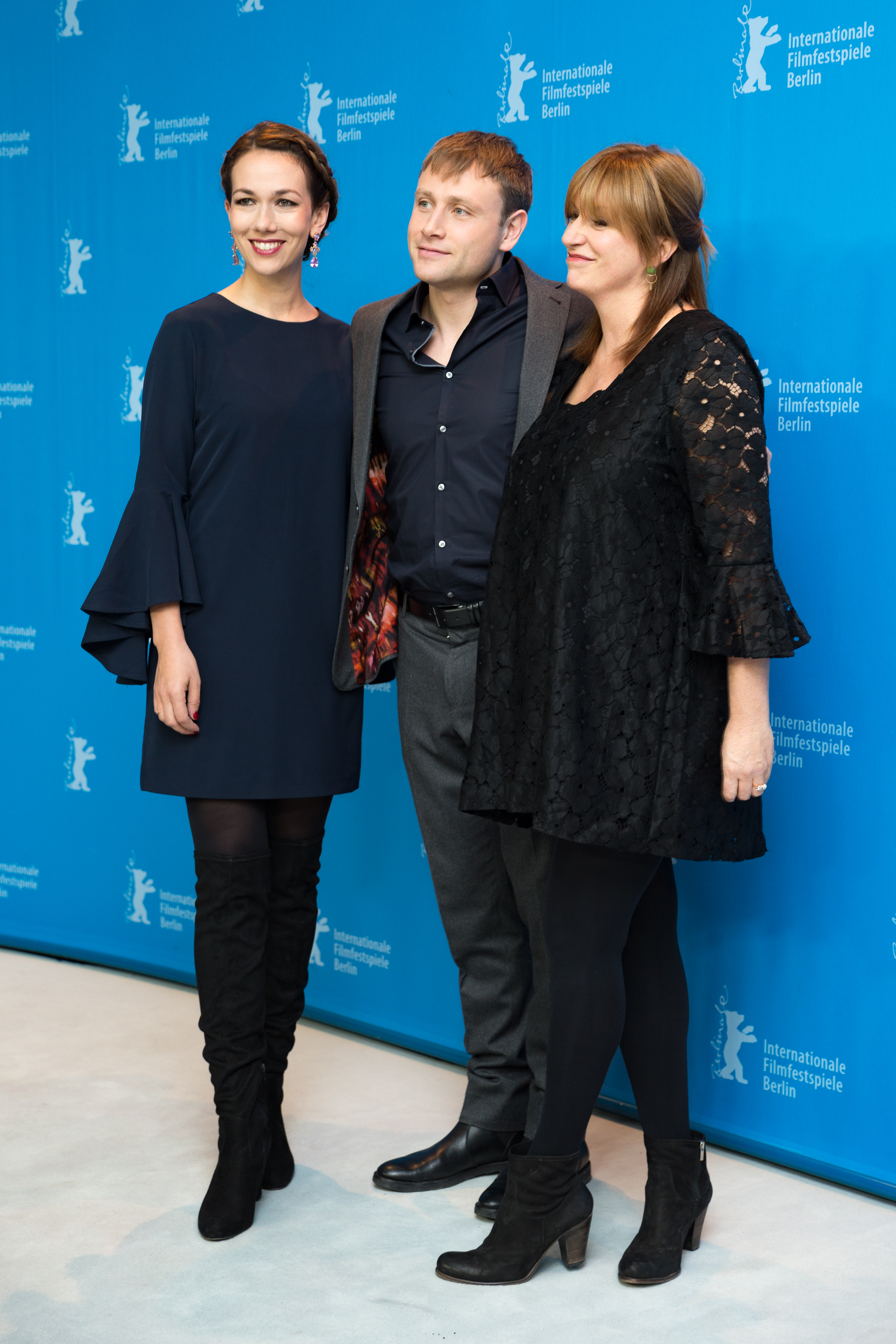
Producer Polly Staniford, actor Max Riemelt and director Cate Shortland at the Berlinale 2017

The film is based on the novel of the same name by Melanie Joosten, and the title is a reference to Stockholm syndrome. According to director Cate Shortland, the character of Andi had romanticised and idealised the East Germany of his childhood, and wanted to recreate a utopia in his own life.

In May 2015, Teresa Palmer and Max Riemelt joined the cast. Riemelt was chosen from a shortlist of 10 male actors.

=== Filming ===
Production began in September 2015 in Berlin. For two weeks prior to filming, Palmer and Riemelt stayed together in a small apartment similar to the one on the set.

In November 2015, filming moved to Docklands Studios Melbourne in Australia.

== Release ==
The film had its world premiere at the Sundance Film Festival on 20 January 2017. Prior to Entertainment One, Curzon Artificial Eye, Vertical Entertainment and Netflix acquired Australian, United Kingdom, and United States distribution rights, respectively. It was released in Australia on 20 April, in the United States on 26 May, and in the United Kingdom on 9 June 2017.

== Reception ==
=== Box office ===
Berlin Syndrome grossed $28,660 in the United States and Canada, and $759,531 in other territories, for a total worldwide gross of $788,191. Sales of its DVD/Blu-ray releases have cashed $22,663.

=== Critical response ===
Berlin Syndrome was met with positive reviews. On review aggregator Rotten Tomatoes, the film holds an approval rating of 76% based on 90 reviews, and an average rating of 6.5/10. The website's critical consensus reads, "Berlin Syndrome offers thriller fans an uncommonly well-written descent into dangerous obsession, enlivened by taut direction and a committed performance from Teresa Palmer." On Metacritic, the film has a weighted average score of 70 out of 100, based on 17 critics, indicating "generally favorable reviews".

=== Accolades ===
Award	Category	Subject	Result
AACTA Awards (7th)	Best Film	Polly Staniford	Nominated
AACTA Awards (7th)	Best Direction	Cate Shortland	Nominated
AACTA Awards (7th)	Best Adapted Screenplay	Shaun Grant	Nominated
AACTA Awards (7th)	Best Actress	Teresa Palmer	Nominated
AACTA Awards (7th)	Best Editing	Jack Hutchings	Nominated
AACTA Awards (7th)	Best Original Music Score	Bryony Marks	Nominated
AACTA Awards (7th)	Best Production Design	Melinda Doring	Nominated
AACTA Awards (7th)	Best Costume Design	Maria Pattison	Nominated
AFCA Awards	Best Film	Berlin Syndrome	Nominated
AFCA Awards	Best Director	Cate Shortland	Nominated
AFCA Awards	Best Actress	Teresa Palmer	Nominated
AFCA Awards	Best Screenplay	Shaun Grant	Nominated
AFCA Awards	Best Cinematography	Germain McMicking	Nominated
ASSG Award	Best Achievement in Sound for Film Sound Recording	Dane Cody, Auryn Lacy, Steffen Graubaum, Felix Kaufmann, Tom Herdman	Nominated
ASSG Award	Best Achievement in Sound for Film Sound Mixing	Sam Gain-Emery, Phil Heywood (re-recording mixer), Glenn Humphries	Nominated
AWGIE Award	Best Writing in a Feature Film - Adaptation	Shaun Grant	Nominated
Dallas International Film Festival	Grand Jury Prize - Narrative Feature Competition	Cate Shortland	Nominated
FCCA Awards	Best Film	Polly Staniford Aquarius Films	Nominated
FCCA Awards	Best Director	Cate Shortland	Nominated
FCCA Awards	Best Actress	Teresa Palmer	Nominated
FCCA Awards	Best Cinematography	Germain McMicking	Nominated
FCCA Awards	Best Original Score	Bryony Marks	Won
FCCA Awards	Best Editing	Jack Hutchings	Nominated
Sundance Film Festival	Grand Jury Prize - World Cinema — Dramatic	Cate Shortland	Nominated
