= Marielle Smith =

Australian politician

Senator Marielle Smith

Senator for South Australia
- Incumbent
- Assumed office 1 July 2019
- Preceded by: Tim Storer

Personal details
- Born: Marielle Catherine Smith; 30 December 1986 (age 39) Sydney, New South Wales, Australia
- Citizenship: Australia; United Kingdom (until 2018)
- Party: Labor
- Children: 2
- Education: Australian National University; London School of Economics (MSc)
- Profession: Politician
- Website: www.mariellesmith.com.au

Marielle Catherine Smith (born 30 December 1986), also known as Marielle Feuerherdt Smith, is an Australian politician. She is a member of the Australian Labor Party (ALP) and has served as a Senator for South Australia since 2019.

== Early life and education ==
Marielle Catherine Smith, also referred to as Marielle Feuerherdt Smith, was born on 30 December 1986 in Sydney. Her mother was born in the United Kingdom and she held British citizenship by descent until renouncing it in 2018 prior to running for parliament.

Smith attended University Senior College in Adelaide, South Australia. She holds the degrees of Bachelor of Arts from the Australian National University and Master of Science from the London School of Economics.

== Career ==
After graduating from ANU she joined the Australian Public Service through the Department of the Prime Minister and Cabinet's graduate program.

Smith has undertaken volunteer work with non-government organisations in Ghana and Sierra Leone. She is a former board member of Transit Systems, a bus company co-founded by her father Neil. She can drive articulated buses.

== Political career ==
=== ALP ===
Smith joined the Australian Labor Party (ALP) at a young age. She worked for Labor MP Kate Ellis as a researcher (2005–2008) and ministerial adviser (2010–2012), and later as a senior policy adviser to Prime Minister Julia Gillard. She regards both Ellis and Gillard as mentors.

In 2017, Smith was elected to the ALP state executive and state council. She also served as a delegate to the Australian Labor Party National Conference. In 2018, she was a preselection candidate for the Division of Adelaide.

=== Senate ===
Smith was elected to the Senate at the 2019 federal election. She is a member of several Senate committees. She has been identified as a member of the Labor Right faction.

In her maiden speech to the Senate, Smith called for Labor to retain its 2019 election policy of funding preschool for three-year-olds "to ensure all children can access world-leading early education and care, regardless of what their parents do, how much they earn or where they live."

== Personal life ==
Smith is married with two children and three step-children. Her husband Clint Feuerherdt is the managing director of SeaLink Travel Group and former CEO of Transit Systems.
