= Lore (2012 film) =

2012 film directed by Cate Shortland

- Theatrical release poster
- Directed by: Cate Shortland
- Written by: Cate Shortland; Robin Mukherjee
- Based on: The Dark Room by Rachel Seiffert
- Produced by: Karsten Stöter; Liz Watts; Paul Welsh; Benny Drechsel
- Starring: Saskia Rosendahl; Kai Malina; Nele Trebs; Ursina Lardi; Hans-Jochen Wagner; Mika Seidel; André Frid; Eva-Maria Hagen
- Cinematography: Adam Arkapaw
- Edited by: Veronika Jenet
- Music by: Max Richter
- Production companies: Rohfilm; Porchlight Films; Edge City Films
- Distributed by: Piffl Medien (Germany); Transmission Films (Australia)
- Release dates: 10 September 2012 (Australia); 11 October 2012 (Germany)
- Running time: 109 minutes
- Countries: Australia; Germany
- Languages: German; English
- Budget: EUR €4.3 million
- Box office: USD $2,362,019

Lore (Note: "Lore" is a name in the German language, so the terminal "e" is sounded, much like the name "Laura", of quite different etymology.) is a 2012 German-language historical drama film directed by Cate Shortland. It is based on the 2001 novel The Dark Room by Rachel Seiffert. In south-west Germany, during the aftermath of World War II, five destitute siblings must travel 900 km (560 mi) to their grandmother's home by the Bay of Husum near Hamburg after their high-level Nazi parents disappear in danger of arrest by Allied occupation authorities. Along the way, they encounter a variety of other Germans, some of whom are helpful while others are antagonistic. Eventually they meet up with a young man presenting himself as Thomas, a young Jewish concentration camp survivor, who joins their group and becomes their unofficial guardian.

It was Australia's submission to the 85th Academy Awards for the Academy Award for Best Foreign Language Film, but was not accepted as a nominee.

== Plot ==
The return of a Nazi officer father towards the end of World War II upsets a family household in Southern Germany. They pack in a rush, kill the family dog and flee their stately home to hide-out in a secluded cabin in a clearing in the woods in the Black Forest. Lore's mother carefully wraps a porcelain figurine of a deer to take with them.

Lore's father leaves for destinations unknown and with the news of the death of Adolf Hitler, her mother is aware of the fact she will be arrested too and goes off to a camp voluntarily, abandoning her five children and leaving Lore in charge with instructions to go to her grandmother's (Omi) house in Husum near Hamburg. Before leaving, Lore's mother gives her all of her jewellery and some money for the train tickets. After the neighbors are no longer willing to sell them any food, Günther is caught stealing so Lore decides it's time to leave. Unfortunately the trains are no longer running so they have to leave all their belongings behind and start their journey on foot.

The children arrive at the ruins of an abandoned house and Lore discovers the dead body of a woman. She goes into the house to look for her brother Günther and stumbles upon a young man sleeping. The next day they arrive at a church and Lore pays a woman to breast-feed her baby brother Peter. They again run into the young man from the day before. News and photos of the atrocities committed at the Nazi concentration camps are posted on a wall in the center of the nearby village for all to see. Lore looks at the photos intently and recognizes her father in a Nazi officer's uniform.

That evening, they move on to stay the night in a school. They encounter the same young man on his own who later makes a sexual advance on Lore but is rebuffed. The next day, he follows them out of the town as they continue on their journey. Arriving at a farm, Lore gives a gold bracelet and her mother's gold ring to an old woman in exchange for food. Lore finds the body of a dead man who shot himself and steals his watch. The old woman begs Lore to leave the baby behind so others will give them food but she refuses and they leave.

While walking, Lore again runs into the same man. She keeps on walking and he follows them. A truck with American soldiers drives up and stops. When asked for identification, the young man says his name is "Thomas" and shows the soldiers his Jewish identification papers and says he is Lore's brother. The Americans give them a lift. The next day, Lore falls ill and Thomas provides food for all of them. While bathing, Liesel questions why Lore doesn't like Thomas. Later Lore stands in front of a seated Thomas, takes his hand and has him fondle her. When he lays his head forward against her legs she pushes him away, overwhelmed.

The following day while walking in the forest, Lore buries the picture of her father and the picture of him at the concentration camp. They continue walking and reach a river they cannot cross. Thomas offers to go across with Peter. Lore says he'll go across and leave the rest of them. Lore goes down a hill and finds an eel fisherman with a rowboat. She asks him for help but he is not interested. She then sees Thomas on the road behind the man, so she allows the man to make sexual advances on her to defy Thomas. Thomas then hits the man over the head with a rock and kills him. Lore is visibly shaken. They take the man's boat and cross the river but while climbing the riverbank Lore is guilt-stricken and backs into the river with the baby in her arms. Thomas pulls them both out and takes Peter from Lore's arms, handing him to Liesel.

Upon reaching the British sector, they are denied passage and must remain in the Soviet sector. Lore asks Thomas if he told the soldiers what they did and he pulls her back from the guards. They decide they will cross into the British sector at night so they can catch one of the trains that are running there. After walking at night in the forest they pitch camp. When they smell somebody cooking, Thomas tells them to stay put and goes off to investigate. A restless Günther sees a man returning and believing it to be Thomas, runs towards him but is shot and killed by Soviet soldiers. Thomas then threatens he will leave them behind unless they keep moving on with him.

During an argument with Lore, Thomas says he can't help them anymore and that they can take the train and reach their destination safely. Lore is afraid he will leave them and in her anger and frustration calls him a filthy Jew. She cries and breaks down, so he decides to stay. They manage to board a train but are stopped by soldiers that ask for their papers. Thomas finds he is missing his wallet with his identity papers. As the soldiers approach, he looks into Lore's eyes, he walks by her, away from the approaching soldiers, and gently nudges her head in passing as a silent farewell. He goes to step off the train to avoid being caught without papers. Lore moves quickly to the window to watch Thomas walk away from the train.

During the final leg of the trip along the muddy tidal plains of the western coast of the Jutland Peninsula, Jürgen confesses that he actually stole Thomas' wallet so he wouldn't abandon them and that the papers weren't his anyway, but belonged to someone else called Thomas Weil, a Jew whom Thomas had been impersonating. Jürgen said he was impersonating a Jew because the Americans liked Jews. Lore asks if he mentioned his name, but Jürgen says he never spoke it.

The four remaining siblings finally arrive at Omi's house. She takes them in, feeds them and lectures them to not ever be ashamed of their parents. She mistakes Jürgen for Günther, and they tell her Günther died in the Soviet sector.

Lore goes to her bedroom, which was her mother's when she was a child, and places her mother's porcelain figurine of the deer on the dresser, next to a collection of similar figurines.

Lore finds it difficult to adjust and refuses to cheerfully dance to American music with Liesel in the kitchen. She goes for a walk in the woods and looks at the identity papers and family pictures of Thomas Weil in Thomas's wallet.

Back at the house, they are sitting at the dining table when Jürgen impulsively grabs a piece of bread. Omi scolds him for not waiting to be served by the housekeeper and asks him whether he has ever learned anything at all. Lore is angered by her grandmother's authoritarianism so, siding with her brother, she also grabs a piece of bread without asking, bites into it and intentionally knocks over her glass of milk, scoops the milk off the table into the palm of her hand to drink the milk. Omi excuses her from the table. Lore goes back to her room, throws the porcelain figurines off the dresser onto the floor and crushes them one by one with her heel.

== Cast ==
- Saskia Rosendahl as Hannelore "Lore" Dressler
- Kai Malina as Thomas
- Nele Trebs as Liesel Dressler
- Ursina Lardi as Mutti (the mother)
- Hans-Jochen Wagner as Vati (the father)
- André Frid as Günther Dressler
- Mika Seidel as Jürgen Dressler
- Eva-Maria Hagen as Omi (the grandmother)
- Nick Holaschke as Peter Dressler
- Sven Pippig as Bauer
- Philip Wiegratz as Helmut

== Production ==
The producer Paul Welsh, secured the film rights to Rachel Seiffert's novel very early and asked Robin Mukherjee to write an adaptation for the cinema. When the director Cate Shortland joined the project she re-wrote part of the screenplay to make it fit her way of working. At a later stage, it was agreed that most of the dialogue should be in German, which delayed the production for a year and forced one of the British funding institutions to back out, as its rules didn't allow backing of non-English language films.

== Release ==
The film was first shown at the Sydney Film Festival on 9 June 2012, followed by the Festival del film Locarno on 2 August, where it won the Piazza Grande audience award, the Prix du public UBS. It was then shown at a large number of film festivals around the world. At the Stockholm International Film Festival, in November, the film was awarded four awards, including the Bronze Horse for best film. It was selected as the Australian entry for the Best Foreign Language Oscar at the 85th Academy Awards, but it did not make the final shortlist.

It was released on cinema in Australia on 20 September 2012, in Germany on 1 November 2012, and in France, Belgium, United Kingdom and Ireland in February 2013, when it also saw a limited release in the United States.

== Reception ==
=== Critical response ===
Lore has an approval rating of 94% on review aggregator website Rotten Tomatoes, based on 117 reviews, and an average rating of 7.7/10. The website's critical consensus states: "Newcomer Saskia Rosendahl gives an astonishingly assured performance in the title role, and director Cate Shortland establishes a delicate, disturbingly ominous tone in the powerful World War II drama Lore". Metacritic assigned the film a weighted average score of 76 out of 100, based on 28 critics, indicating "generally favorable reviews".

Lisa Schwarzbaum, reviewer for Entertainment Weekly, gave the film a B+ and wrote, "This striking, slow-building drama from Cate Shortland (Somersault) uses fractured, impressionistic imagery as a mirror of moral dislocation as the children make their way through an unfamiliar landscape. If everything Lore (Saskia Rosendahl, capturing teen-girl sullenness) has been taught is wrong—about Hitler, about Jews, about the glory of her Vaterland, she might as well be walking on the moon."

Shane Danielsen of SBS awarded the film four stars out of five, commenting that "Beautiful, it may be, but it is by no means a bourgeois film...it is a rebuke to notions of middle-class propriety, as well as a formidable work in its own right."

=== Awards and nominations ===
Lore received the Feature Film Production of the Year Award at the 2013 Screen Producers Australia Awards. Lore also received the Bronze award for Outstanding Feature Film at the German Film Awards. Lore has also received 17 other awards internationally.

== See also ==
- List of submissions to the 85th Academy Awards for Best Foreign Language Film
- List of Australian submissions for the Academy Award for Best Foreign Language Film
