= Kent Smith (producer) =

Australian cinematographer and film producer

- Occupation: Film producer
- Writing career
- Years active: 1972-

Kent Smith is an Australian cinematographer and film producer, and founding partner of the Kojo group of companies.

== Career ==
Smith began his career as a cinematographer in Australian television with Seven Network Australia in 1972.

After more than a decade working in network television in Victoria and South Australia, where he won many national and international awards, Smith established his own Adelaide-based production company, Kent Smith Productions, in 1984.

He spent seven years working with some of Australia's largest corporate clients, then in 1991 he expanded the business to form the Kojo Group, which he co-founded with cinematographer, director, and writer John Chataway (who died in 2010).

In 2005, Smith took the Kojo Group into feature film production, starting with the film 2:37, which was an Official Selection at the 2006 Cannes Film Festival. Two Kojo-produced films were released in 2009: Closed for Winter and Beautiful, both premiering at the Adelaide Film Festival before their cinema releases. The 2010 film The Tree was also an Official Selection and the closing film at 2010 Cannes Film Festival.

As of March 2013, Smith was a member of the Kojo board. In June 2013, Kojo announced a multi-million dollar investment deal with American company Main Street Films, to collaborate on an upcoming feature film that would be a co-production between Kojo and South Australian writer/director Murali K. Thalluri from M2E, with South African company Enigma Pictures as the co-producer. The film, titled One, was described as "a racially fuelled post-apocalyptic adventure as seen through the eyes of a 26-year old girl", and was set to be filmed in South Africa and produced by Smith. Main Street announced cast members at Cannes Film Festival in 2014, but in 2019 it was reported as never being made. As of November 2025, One is still listed on IMDb as "in development".

In February 2019 US company Wonderfilm announced a new film by Thalluri titled Run, to be produced by Wonderfilm along with Smith at Kojo and Thalluri.

== Memberships and recognition ==
Smith became an accredited member of the Australian Cinematographers Society on 14 September 2001.

KOJO established the Smithy Award in honour of Smith, to celebrate "the quiet achievers... The unsung hero who is creating magic on a daily basis without the public recognition they truly deserve". The award is presented to a staff member each year.

== Filmography ==
Smith's film producing credits include:

Feature films	Year	Director(s)
2:37 (Official selection Cannes)	2006	Murali K. Thalluri
Beautiful	2009	Dean O'Flaherty
Closed for Winter	2009	James Bogle
The Tree (Official selection Cannes)	2010	Julie Bertuccelli
Sons & Mothers	2013	Christopher Houghton
The Pack	2015	Nick Robertson

Short films	Year	Director(s)
Frames	2004	Mat King
Spike Up (AFI Best Short Fiction Film)	2007	Anthony Maras

== See also ==
- Cinema of Australia
