= Ausfilm =

Australian government/industry partnership

Ausfilm, originally Export Film Services Association, is an Australian government-industry partnership that acts as a national content attraction organisation. Headquartered in Sydney, Ausfilm also has an office in Los Angeles, California.

== History ==
Ausfilm was established in 1994 as the Export Film Services Association after Austrade recognised potential opportunities for the country in the American market. It was converted to an incorporated association, Ausfilm International Inc., in 1998.

In October 2019, Kate Marks, who had for five years been executive vice president of international production in Ausfilm's Los Angeles office, was appointed CEO, replacing Debra Richards. At that time, Sam Mostyn was chair of the Ausfilm board.

Emma Drummond, head of legal and business affairs for VFX studio Animal Logic, along with Dale Roberts, general manager of KOJO Studios, were appointed to the board in September 2021.

In 2023/24, Ausfilm handled enquiries worth around A$3.9 billion.

== Description and functions ==
Ausfilm is headquartered at Fox Studios Australia in Sydney and also maintains an office in Los Angeles, US, in order to attract investment in Australian films. One of its main goals is to get film production work done in Australia.

It is a membership-based organisation, its members including all types of companies providing film industry services, including entertainment travel companies. Its members include nine federal, state, territory, and local government screen agencies and 50 corporate businesses. Ausfilm receives an annual grant from the Australian Government, and provides a report to the government on its operations and the state of the film industry each year.

The organisation connects the international film community with Australia's screen incentives, talent and facilities. It is composed of private-sector screen production service companies as well as the federal Department of Infrastructure, Transport, Regional Development, Communications, Sport and the Arts and relevant state government bodies.

The Ausfilm team in LA meets regularly with Australian writers, director, and producers, whether visiting or based there, and aim to help them connect with clients who could help progress their projects. It also works with independent production companies in LA who are working with or seeking an Australian screenwriter, and may help to connect them to an Australian producer.

Ausfilm markets the Australian Screen Production Incentive (ASPI) scheme, which offers location, PDV (post, digital, and visual effects), and producer offsets.

It also writes submissions to all levels of government about specific matters, for instance "The Art of Tax Reform" consultation by the NSW Government.

== People ==
Board members elected for a three-year term from September 2025 include:

- Samantha Martin-Williams (chair)
- Emma Drummond, vice president, studio legal, Netflix Animation Studios
- Dale Roberts, CEO of KOJO Studios
- Yasmine Lintmeijer, head of Disney Studios Australia
- Lynne Benzie, president of Village Roadshow Studios, Queensland
- Deirdre Brennan, CEO of Screen Australia
- Kyas Hepworth, head of Screen NSW
- Jacqui Feeney, CEO of Screen Queensland
- Rikki Lea Bestall, Screenwest CEO
- Caroline Pitcher, VicScreen CEO

== Publications ==
Ausfilm publishes an annual magazine, Ausfilm Magazine, each containing articles around a theme pertaining to the film industry.

In 2006, Ausfilm published a map of Australia titled "Australia, anywhere you want to be", with names of places across the world superimposed on locations in Australia, for instance New York City on Melbourne; Canada, Italy, Costa Rica at locations across Western Australia; Munich on Adelaide; Mars on regional South Australia; and Miami in South East Queensland.
