= The Choice (2016 film) =

- Theatrical release poster
- Directed by: Ross Katz
- Screenplay by: Bryan Sipe
- Based on: The Choice by Nicholas Sparks
- Produced by: Nicholas Sparks; Peter Safran; Theresa Park
- Starring: Benjamin Walker; Teresa Palmer; Maggie Grace; Alexandra Daddario; Tom Welling; Tom Wilkinson
- Cinematography: Alar Kivilo
- Edited by: Joe Klotz; Lucy Donaldson
- Music by: Marcelo Zarvos
- Production companies: Nicholas Sparks Productions; The Safran Company
- Distributed by: Lionsgate
- Release date: February 5, 2016
- Running time: 111 minutes
- Country: United States
- Language: English
- Budget: $10 million
- Box office: $24.3 million

The Choice is a 2016 American romantic drama film directed by Ross Katz and written by Bryan Sipe, based on Nicholas Sparks' 2007 novel about two neighbors who fall in love at their first meeting. The movie stars Benjamin Walker, Teresa Palmer, Maggie Grace, Alexandra Daddario, Tom Welling and Tom Wilkinson.

Principal photography began on October 13, 2014, in Wilmington, North Carolina. Lionsgate released the film on February 5, 2016, and it was a box office success, grossing $24.3 million on a budget of $10 million, but was panned by critics, who described the film as "painfully formulaic", and criticized the pacing, characters and screenplay.

== Plot ==
Travis Shaw is a veterinarian, living in the city of Wilmington, NC, who falls in love at first sight with Gabby Holland, who has moved into the house next door.

Their initial meeting, however, is rather rocky as Travis is hosting a noisy barbecue, complete with loud music while Gabby is trying to study next door. She is a medical student who is in a relationship with fellow doctor Ryan McCarthy. Travis has an on-again, off-again relationship with Monica. With Ryan in Atlanta for a few weeks overseeing a new hospital opening, Gabby seeks Travis's help with the delivery of her dog Molly's puppies, whom she at first believed were fathered by his rescue dog Moby.

As Molly has a complication, Travis insists on taking her and the puppies into his clinic. When his dad finds him asleep on the floor with them, he accurately surmises he's smitten with their owner.

The next day, Travis takes Gabby instead of Monica on a boat excursion with his friends. Travis's sister Stephanie, who had previously noted his interest in Gabby, observes it may be mutual. When he proposes to enter her place, she coyly says no. But shortly thereafter Gabby makes Travis dinner. He kisses her passionately, and they spend the night together.

Gabby and Travis spend time together, starting a relationship. They both celebrate his deceased mother's birthday with his family, then he takes her to his privately owned islet where he only visits alone. Travis even buys another wooden Adirondack chair for his lawn, symbolizing his personal investment.

Ryan returns, and is keen to resume his relationship with Gabby. Travis pours out his feelings to her but she, unsure of how she feels, tells Travis that their relationship wasn't necessarily serious, then says yes to Ryan's marriage proposal. Monica breaks up with Travis, telling him that she realizes he and Gabby are in love, suggesting he fight for her.

Travis goes to the hospital, only to find out she left after breaking off her engagement with Ryan. Ryan punches him for the affair. Travis then goes to Gabby's family home in South Carolina to propose. Initially resistant, everyone encourages him, her father suggesting he get down on one knee and her mother giving him her grandmother's ring. After convincing her of his love, she says yes. They marry and over the course of the next few years they have two children and become a happy family.

One evening, after a dinner to which Travis is late again due to a work emergency, Gabby gets tired of waiting. As she drives back home, she is involved in a traffic accident. She survives but is now in a coma, which seems permanent as she's been in it over 90 days. Travis is shown her DNR order, and asked to sign it. Racked with guilt, he has to decide whether to take her off life support.

After a hurricane hits their house, Moby helps Travis find the wind chimes Gabby had on her porch. He goes to his island and builds a gazebo, hanging them there. The shell chime starts to ring in the wind and Travis runs to the hospital where Gabby has woken up from her coma. When he walks in she says "you're late." He takes her home where she is welcomed by the family and Travis' sister's newborn child.

To make up for missing their dinner date, Travis and Gabby have one in the front yard. When he struggles to find words, she reveals she heard everything he said while she was in the coma, including his remark that he was "breathing for her." The movie finishes with Travis, Gabby, their children and dogs all sitting in the gazebo ('Gabby's Point'), looking up at the stars and moon.

== Cast ==
- Benjamin Walker as Dr. Travis Shaw
- Teresa Palmer as Gabriela "Gabby" Holland
- Maggie Grace as Stephanie Shaw
- Alexandra Daddario as Monica
- Tom Welling as Dr. Ryan McCarthy
- Tom Wilkinson as Dr. Shep Shaw
- Noree Victoria as Liz
- Brad James as Ben
- Anna Enger as Megan
- Wilbur Fitzgerald as Mr. Holland
- Callan White as Mrs. Holland
- Jesse C. Boyd as Matt
- Dianne Sellers as Jackie
- Brett Rice as Dr. McCarthy

== Production ==
On June 10, 2014, Lionsgate acquired the American and United Kingdom rights to make a film adaptation of Nicholas Sparks' 2007 novel The Choice. Bryan Sipe wrote the script for the film, which Sparks, Theresa Park and Peter Safran produced. On September 2, Ross Katz was set to direct the film, which Sparks co-financed and -produced with his Nicholas Sparks Productions, along with Safran's The Safran Company. On September 30, Benjamin Walker was cast to play the lead role in the film, Travis Parker. On the same day, Teresa Palmer was cast as the female lead, Gabby Holland. On October 7, Tom Wilkinson was added to the cast to play Dr. Shep. On October 8, Alexandra Daddario, Tom Welling, and Maggie Grace joined the film. Welling plays Ryan, a doctor at his father's practice who is Gabby's boyfriend, and Grace plays Travis' sister, Stephanie.

Principal photography on the film began on October 13, 2014, in Wilmington, North Carolina, and lasted through November 21. For the first three days, the crew and extras filmed at the Dockside Restaurant & Bar and Bridge Tender Marina along with actors, near Wrightsville Beach. On October 20, filming was taking place at Hanover Seaside Club in Wrightsville Beach. The production later moved to downtown Wilmington, where filming took place in a house.

== Reception ==
=== Box office ===
The Choice grossed $18.7 million in North America and $5.6 million in other territories for a worldwide total of $24.3 million.

The film was released in North America on February 5, 2016, alongside Pride and Prejudice and Zombies and Hail, Caesar!. The film was projected to gross $7–9 million from 2,631 theaters in its opening weekend. It made $290,000 from Thursday night previews and $6,050,443 in its opening weekend, finishing fifth at the box office behind Kung Fu Panda 3 ($21.2 million), Hail, Caesar! ($11.4 million), Star Wars: The Force Awakens ($7 million) and The Revenant ($6.9 million).

=== Critical reception ===
The Choice was panned by critics, and was the lowest-rated adaptation of a Nicholas Sparks novel, surpassing The Best of Me. On Rotten Tomatoes, the film has a rating of 11%, based on 83 reviews, with an average rating of 3.8/10. The site's critical consensus reads: "Like the 10 Nicholas Sparks movies before it, The Choice finds tragedy striking star-crossed lovers in the sun-dappled South – yet even for those who loved its predecessors, this gauzy melodrama may feel painfully formulaic." Metacritic reports a score of 26 out of 100, based on 23 critics, indicating "generally unfavorable reviews". Audiences polled by CinemaScore gave the film an average grade of "B+" on an A+ to F scale.

Frank Scheck of The Hollywood Reporter criticized the film as being "the cinematic equivalent of staring at a Hallmark Card for two hours." A. A. Dowd of The A.V. Club called it "a formulaic mush". Moira Macdonald of the Seattle Times wrote the film "moves inexorably to its inevitable tear-jerky end."

Andrew Barker of Variety described the film as "beginning as a merely mediocre retread of standard Sparksian tropes, veering off into self-parody around the hour-mark, and finally concluding with one of the most brazenly cynical climaxes recently committed to film." Devan Coggan of Entertainment Weekly concluded that the film was a "predictable, recycled mess."

== Home media ==
The Choice was released on DVD and Blu-ray on May 3, 2016.
