= Tahyna Tozzi =

Australian actor and model

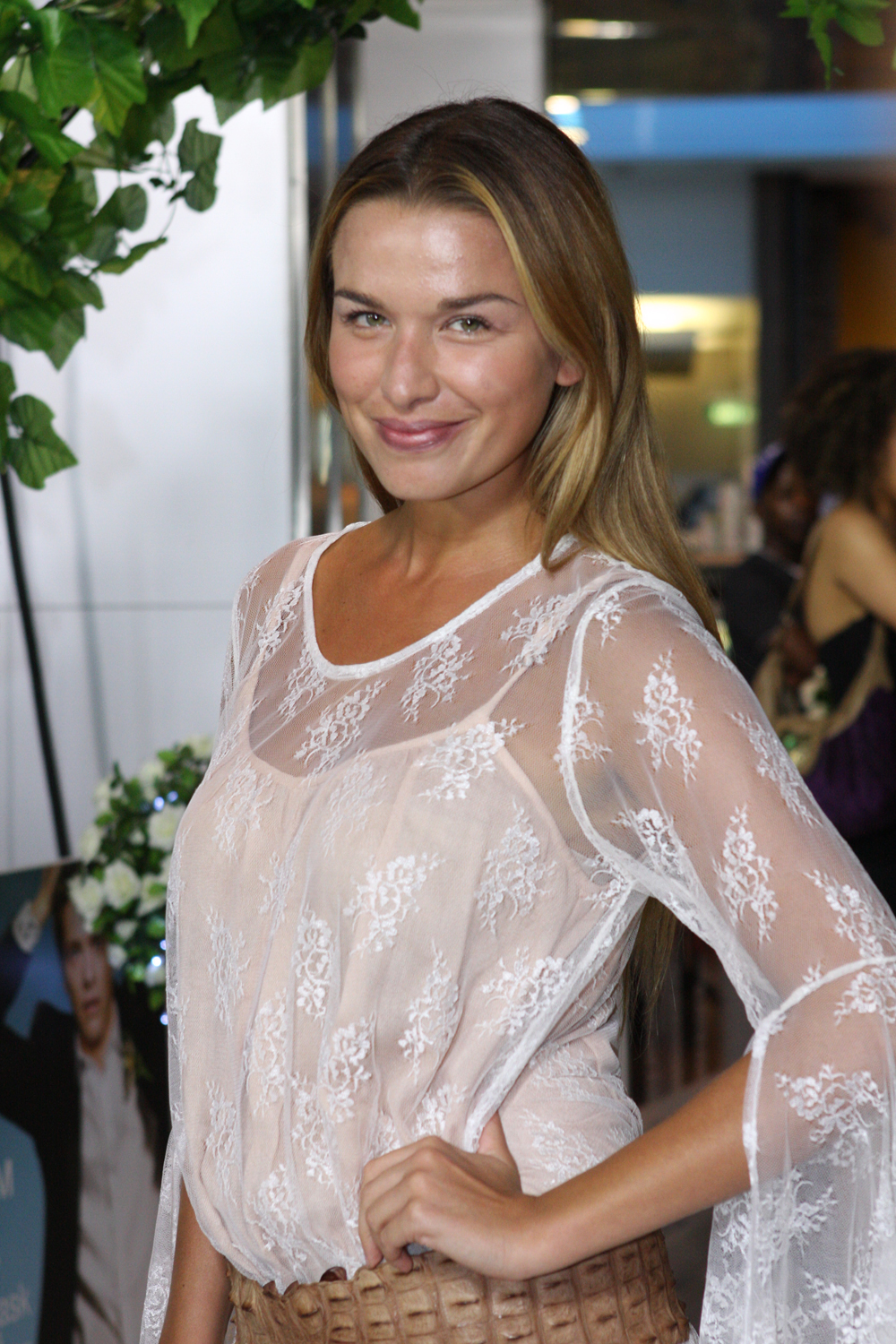
- Tahyna Tozzi in January 2012
- Born: Tahyna Valentina Tozzi; 24 April 1986 (age 40); Cronulla, Sydney, Australia
- Occupations: Actress; model; director; producer
- Years active: 1994–present
- Known for: Blue Water High (2005–2006)
- Height: 1.73 m (5 ft 8 in)
- Spouse: Tristan MacManus (m. 2014; sep. 2023)
- Children: 3
- Relatives: Cheyenne Tozzi (sister)

Tahyna Tozzi is an Australian actress, director, writer and producer. She starred in several television series and film blockbusters including X-Men Origins: Wolverine, before moving into production.

== Early life ==
Tozzi grew up in the Sydney beach-side suburb of Cronulla, with her Italian father, Nicola, Dutch model mother, Yvonne and younger sister, model Cheyenne. Her family established the Italian venue, Caffe Roma in Sydney's Kings Cross, in the 1980s.

Tozzi began modelling at eight years old, alongside her sister, appearing in high end fashion campaigns and magazines throughout the 2000s.

== Career ==
Tozzi played Gold Coast glamour queen, Perri in ABC teen drama Blue Water High from 2005 to 2006. Following that, she starred alongside Asher Keddie in 2009 film Beautiful, her first feature, playing 17-year-old provocateur Suzy, and appeared opposite Hugh Jackman in X-Men Origins: Wolverine as Emma, a mutant able to turn her skin into diamond.

Tozzi next starred in 2010 psychological horror film Needle, opposite Michael Dorman, Travis Fimmel and Ben Mendelsohn. The following year, she starred alongside David Gallagher and Ryan Eggold in 2011 film Trophy Kids, which won Best Ensemble Cast at the Breckenridge Festival of Film.

Tozzi also performed voice acting for the character of Daina Le Guin in the 2011 sci-fi horror game Dead Space 2, for which her physical likeness was also used.

Tozzi then moved into producing and directing, Her directorial debut, Oren, screened at festivals internationally, winning Best International Film at the Hollywood Reel Independent Film Festival.

In 2020, she released the documentary feature, Misunderstandings of Miscarriage, inspired by her own experience of pregnancy loss. The film, also featuring Claire Holt and Deborra-Lee Furness, aimed to shatter the silence and grief surrounding pregnancy loss, through interviews with women and medical professionals across the world. The film premiered on STAN Australia, followed by a release on Netflix and garnered critical and audience acclaim.

In 2022, Tozzi joined her husband Tristan McManus to guest host several episodes of light news program Studio 10.

In 2024, Tozzi wrote, directed and had a starring role in the short film Bread. The following year, she directed, produced and edited ABBA & Elvis in the Outback, a documentary, where two small towns compete to revive their communities through music and celebration. The film was broadcast on SBS, before being licensed for international distribution. She has also directed the short films The Fifty and The Prelude: Lady Blue.

Tozzi is also co-founder of the all-female-led production company Neon Jane, which she established with producer Kelly Tomasich. In 2020, the pair launched the Australian Women's Film Festival, dedicated to celebrating Australian women in film and honouring those who have made significant contributions to the industry.

== Personal life ==
Tozzi met Irish ballroom dancer Tristan MacManus in 2011, when they were set up through friends at a restaurant in Los Angeles. The pair were married on 25 January 2014 in Cronulla, after dividing much of their time between Ireland and LA.

On 5 April 2016, Tozzi gave birth to a daughter named Echo Isolde. On 14 March 2019, she gave birth to a son named Oisín Lír. Tozzi gave birth to her third child, a son named Tadhg Nuada on 3 May 2021. In 2017, the family bought a family home in Sutherland Shire.

In 2025, it was revealed that Tozzi and McManus had been separated for quite some time.

Tozzi's mother Yvonne was operated on by Dr Charlie Teo for a brain tumour in May 2013.

== Filmography ==
=== Film ===
Year	Title	Role	Notes	Ref
2009	Beautiful	Suzy	Feature film	
2009	X-Men Origins: Wolverine	Emma Silverfox / Emma Frost	Feature film	
2010	Needle	Mary Matthews	Feature film	
2011	Trophy Kids	Quinn Thorndike	Feature film	
2013	Chasing Clouds		Short film	
2013	The Last Light	Jenny	Feature film	
2014	The Ever After	Ms. Sanders	Feature film	
2014	Julia	Sadie	Feature film	
2017	The Fifty	Walter	Short film	
2017	Puppets vs. People: Wonder Woman	Wonder Woman	Short film	
2018	The Prelude: Lady Blue	Echo	Short film	
2023	Finally Me	Louise	Feature film	
2024	Bread	Remi	Short film	
2025	It Will Find You	Detective Hughes	Feature film	
2026	The Better Man	Diane Gooding	Feature film	
TBA	Tarantulas	TBA	Post-production	
TBA	Track Town	TBA	In development	

=== Television ===
Year	Title	Role	Notes	Ref
2005–2006	Blue Water High	Perri Lawe	27 episodes	
2008	The Strip	Kristal Cade	3 episodes	
2008	CSI: NY	Quinci Feeney	Season 5, episode 11: "Forbidden Fruit"	
2009	Eleventh Hour	Gorgeous Model (uncredited)	Season 1, episode 17: "Olfactus"	
2009	CSI: Crime Scene Investigation	Olivia Hamilton	Season 10, episode 1: "Family Affair"	
2011	Charlie's Angels	Amanda Kane	Season 1, episode 3: "Bon Voyage, Angels"	
2015	Scary Endings	Sasha	Season 1, episode 1: "We Always Come Back"	

=== Video game ===
Year	Title	Role	Notes	Ref
2011	Dead Space 2	Daina Le Guin	Video game	

=== As director / producer ===
Year	Title	Role	Notes	Ref
2014	Oren	Writer / director	Short film	
2016	Noomie	Writer	5 episodes	
2016	Boys in the Trees	Third assistant director	Film	
2017	The Fifty	Director / producer	Short film	
2018	The Prelude: Lady Blue	Writer / director	Short film	
2018	Patricia Moore	Director attachment / extras casting	10 episodes	
2020	Misunderstandings of Miscarriage	Director / producer / additional cinematography	Documentary film	
2024	Bread	Writer / director	Short film	
2025	ABBA & Elvis in the Outback	Director / producer / editor	Documentary film	
TBA	Track Town	Screenplay / producer	In development	
TBA	Barriers	Producer	In development	

== Awards ==
Year	Work	Award	Category	Result	Ref
2011	Trophy Kids	Breckenridge Festival of Film	Brst Ensemble Cast	Won	
	Oren	Independent Film Festival	Best International Short Reel	Won	
	Oren	Hollywood Reel Independent Film Festival	Best International Film	Won	
