= Frank Sweet =

Australian actor and musician (born 1988)

- Born: 7 March 1988 (age 38); Melbourne, Australia
- Parent(s): Gary Sweet (father); Jill Miller (mother)

Frank Sweet (born 7 March 1988) is an Australian food writer, musician and actor.

== Early life ==
Sweet was born in Melbourne, Victoria to veteran Australian actor Gary Sweet. He is currently based in Melbourne.

== Career ==
Sweet made his film debut as Marcus in independent film 2:37, released on 17 August 2006, for which he was nominated for an AACTA Award.

Sweet is the drummer in the band These New South Whales, who were nominated for an ARIA Award for their 2022 album "TNSW". He also played drums in the band Skye Harbour, who won MTV Australia's 'Kickstart' competition for unsigned bands, and were flown to Sydney for the 2008 ARIA Music Awards.

Producers of the Channel 7 hit Dancing with the Stars considered including a father-son twist between Frank and Gary in the Season Five lineup, but Frank was ultimately dropped before production. However, the network's publicity manager is quoted as saying that "he's definitely someone who is on the Seven radar."

According to the Adelaide Advertiser, "Rumour has it the star has scored a small speaking role as a mechanic on Channel 9 drama McLeod's Daughters." Frank also appeared in a guest role on Channel 7's crime show City Homicide, as Aaron Linton.

Sweet played Billy Fischer in 2014 miniseries Fat Tony & Co. for Channel 9, which focused on Tony Mokbel and his part in the ten year underworld war.
