= Restraint (2008 film) =

- Restraint poster
- Directed by: David Denneen
- Written by: Dave Warner
- Produced by: Dan Halsted; Mark Lazarus; Anna Fawcett; Todd Fellman
- Starring: Stephen Moyer; Travis Fimmel; Teresa Palmer
- Cinematography: Simon Duggan
- Edited by: Toby Denneen; Rodrigo Balart
- Music by: Elliott Wheeler
- Production companies: Filmgraphics Entertainment; Film Finance
- Distributed by: Accent Film Entertainment
- Release dates: 19 August 2008 (United States); 2 April 2009 (Australia)
- Running time: 90 minutes
- Country: Australia
- Language: English
- Budget: $5,000,000

Restraint is a 2008 Australian thriller film, directed by David Denneen, written by Dave Warner and starring Stephen Moyer, Travis Fimmel and Teresa Palmer. The film was shot on location around New South Wales, Australia in mid-2005. Working titles during production were Ravenswood, Guests and Power Surge. It also features a cameo by Vanessa Redgrave. In the film, a couple of fugitives take an estate owner hostage, complicating their flight from justice.

== Plot ==
Two fugitives from justice, Dale and Ron, take hostage Andrew, an agoraphobic art dealer who might have a dark past of his own. All three soon find themselves participants in a game of survival.

Before the narrative begins, Ron has killed Dale's boss, the owner of a strip club. On the run, the couple kills a gas station attendant who sees the body in the trunk of their car. Stumbling across Andrew's magnificent country estate, the couple plans to hide out there until the search for them abates. Ron, impulsive and out of control, abuses and threatens to kill Andrew, but Dale intervenes. Andrew proposes to give them AU 40,000 dollars and valuable jewelry to aid their getaway. Someone, though, must go to the bank to retrieve the goods. Andrew suggests Dale do it, posing as his fiancée, Gabrielle. Dale, as Gabrielle, drives to town and twice enters the bank without creating suspicion.

While Dale is gone, Andrew tells Ron that Gabrielle had left him after having an affair with his father and being paid by him to leave; he subsequently hired a hit man to kill his father. To persuade Ron to leave him alive, he offers leverage in the form of a photo that proves he had his father killed. While allegedly retrieving the photo, Andrew manages to lock Ron in the cellar, but Ron escapes and regains the upper hand.

Dale returns, and the couple prepares to leave. Ron again makes a move to kill Andrew; Dale, who has been partly seduced by Andrew and his way of life, grabs their shotgun and shoots at Ron, without realizing that he has left the gun unloaded. Ron knocks Dale out and leaves her in a locked car filled with exhaust, sadistically goading Andrew into braving his agoraphobia in order to save her. Andrew manages to save her and wound Ron; reviving, Dale deals Ron a death blow.

With Ron dead, Andrew moves to call the police. Dale stops him by re-assuming her pose as Gabrielle, and, prompted by Andrew, by telling him in Gabrielle's voice that she loves him. They have sex—again, with Dale coached to speak in Gabrielle's voice. Afterwards, Dale asks Andrew what would happen if Gabrielle came back while she's impersonating her. Andrew assures her Gabrielle is "gone", as we see him burning Gabrielle's passport, ambiguously suggesting he actually killed her. Later, Andrew plays Wagner downstairs alone and seems to celebrate, while Dale gazes forlornly out the house's top-floor window.

== Cast ==
- Teresa Palmer as Dale
- Travis Fimmel as Ronald 'Ron' Jason Beron
- Stephen Moyer as Andrew Shepard
- Philip Holder as Sergeant Paul Wittens
- Margie McCrae as Mrs. Wynott
- Peter Davies as Terry Gilmore
- Alyssa McClelland as Gabrielle
- Nate Jones as Tim
- Joanne Hunt as Constable Edwina Blainey
- Patrick Ward as Andrew's father

== Production ==
Over half the budget came from the Film Finance Corporation. The film was shot in late 2005 near Goulburn and Camden in New South Wales, originally using the title Guests, then Ravenswood. Stephen Moyer was imported from the United Kingdom to support his two Australian co-stars.

== Release ==
The film was originally meant to be released in May 2006 by Accent Entertainment. Multiple test screenings resulted in the film's running time being reduced from 120 to 90 minutes, and the ending being changed to something more ambiguous. It eventually screened in one cinema in Sydney in April 2009.
