= Cate Shortland =

Australian film and television writer and director

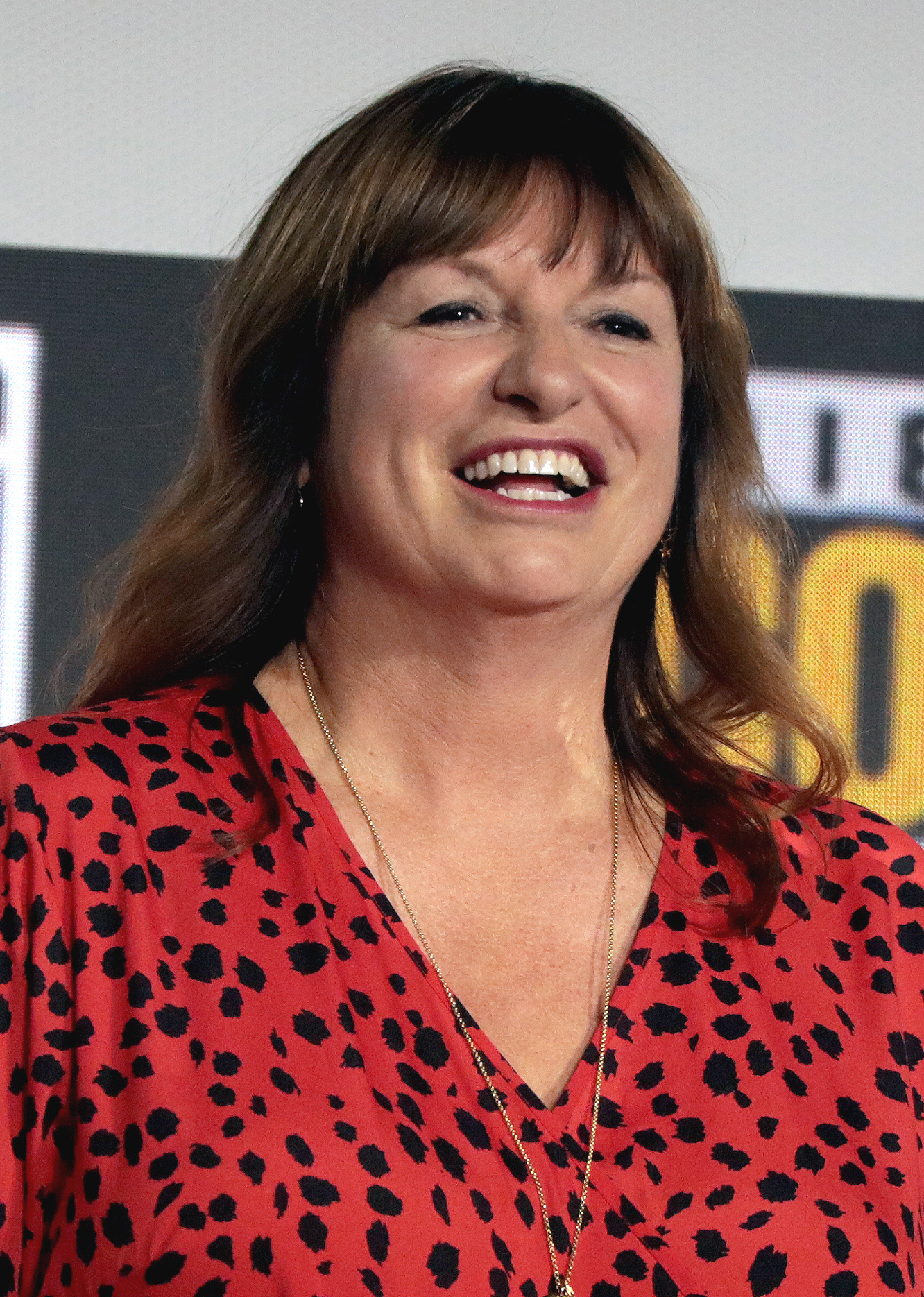
- Shortland at the 2019 San Diego Comic-Con
- Born: Catherine Shortland; 10 August 1968 (age 57); Temora, New South Wales, Australia
- Occupations: Director, screenwriter
- Spouse: Tony Krawitz (m. 2009)
- Children: 2

Cate Shortland (born 10 August 1968) is an Australian director and screenwriter. She received international acclaim for her 2004 romantic drama film Somersault, her 2012 historical drama film Lore, and her 2017 psychological thriller film Berlin Syndrome. She is best known for directing the 2021 superhero film Black Widow.

== Early life ==
Shortland was born in Temora, New South Wales. She graduated from the Australian Film, Television and Radio School, where she received the Southern Star Award for most promising student.

== Career ==
Shortland has created several award-winning short films: Strap on Olympia (1995); Pentuphouse (1998); Flower Girl (2000); and Joy (2000).

She spent three years directing episodes of the Network Ten television series, The Secret Life of Us.

In 2004, Shortland released her debut feature-length film, Somersault (2004), which was entered in the Un Certain Regard section at the 2004 Cannes Film Festival. She directed the Australian television film The Silence.

Her second feature, Lore, had its Australian premiere at the 2012 Sydney Film Festival. It won at the Locarno International Film Festival in August 2012 the Prix du Public UBS. In November, the film won the Bronze Horse for best film at the Stockholm International Film Festival. The film was selected as the Australian entry for the Best Foreign Language Oscar at the 85th Academy Awards, but it did not make the final shortlist.

In 2015, Shortland announced she was working on a third feature film, Berlin Syndrome. Based on the book of the same name by Melanie Joosten, the film starred Teresa Palmer as an Australian photojournalist who becomes imprisoned in the apartment of a man with whom she has a one-night stand. The film premiered at the 2017 Sundance Film Festival.

In July 2018, Shortland was announced as the director of the 2021 Black Widow film for Marvel Studios.

== Personal life ==
Shortland is a convert to Judaism. She married filmmaker Tony Krawitz in 2009, and they have two children.

== Filmography ==
Short film

Year	Title	Director	Writer
1998	Pentuphouse	Yes	Yes
1999	Flowergirl	Yes	Yes
2000	Joy	Yes	Yes

Feature film

Year	Title	Director	Writer
2004	Somersault	Yes	Yes
2012	Lore	Yes	Yes
2017	Berlin Syndrome	Yes	Additional
2021	Black Widow	Yes	No

Television

Year	Title	Director	Writer	Notes
2001–2003	The Secret Life of Us	Yes	No	10 episodes
2002–2003	Bad Cop, Bad Cop	Yes	No	4 episodes
2006	The Silence	Yes	No	TV movie
2012	The Slap	No	Yes	Episode "Rosie"
2014	Devil's Playground	No	Yes	Episode "The Whirlwind and the Storm"
2015	Deadline Gallipoli	No	Yes	Episode 2
2016	The Kettering Incident	No	Yes	Teleplay for episode "The Search"; Additional material for episode "The Mill"
2019	SMILF	Yes	No	4 episodes
2024	Three Women	Yes	No	Episode 4: "Maggie"

== Awards and nominations ==
Year	Film	Notes
2004	Somersault	AACTA Award for Best Direction; AACTA Award for Best Original Screenplay; AWGIE Award for Best Writing in a Feature Film - Original; FCCA Award for Best Director; Inside Film Award for Best Feature Film; Inside Film Award for Best Direction; Inside Film Award for Best Script; Ljubljana International Film Festival Kingfisher Award; Miami International Film Festival Special Jury Award for Breakthrough Director; Miami International Film Festival Special Mention Breakthrough Award; Nominated — Cannes Film Festival - Golden Camera; Nominated — Cannes Film Festival - Un Certain Regard Award; Nominated — FCCA Award for Best Original Screenplay; Nominated — Tokyo International Film Festival Grand Prix
2006	The Silence	Australian Screen Sound Guild award for Best Achievement in Sound for a Tele-Feature or Mini-Series; Nominated — AFI Award for Best Telefeature or Mini Series; Nominated — the 2007 Logie Awards for Silver Logie in Most Outstanding Drama Series, Miniseries or Telemovie.
2012	Lore	Abu Dhabi Film Festival - Black Pearl Award for Best Narrative Feature; ADG Award for Best Direction in a Feature Film; AFCA Award for Best Director; AFCA Award for Best Screenplay; AWGIE Award for Best Writing in a Feature Film - Adapted; Beijing International Film Festival Tiantian Award for Best Director; Beijing College Student Film Festival Special Jury Award; FCCA Award for Best Director; Filmfest Hamburg Critics Award; Hamptons International Film Festival - Golden Starfish Award; Locarno Festival - Audience Award; Stockholm International Film Festival - Bronze Horse for Best Film; Tromsø International Film Festival - Aurora Award; Valladolid International Film Festival - Pilar Miró Award for Best New Director; Nominated — AACTA Award for Best Direction; Nominated — AACTA Award for Best Adapted Screenplay; Nominated — Asia-Pacific Film Festival Award for Best Director; Nominated — Beijing International Film Festival Tiantian Award for Best Director; Nominated — BFI London Film Festival; Nominated — FCCA Award for Best Screenplay; Nominated — Locarno Festival - Audience Award; Nominated — Sydney Film Festival Prize; Nominated — Thessaloniki International Film Festival - Open Horizons Award; Nominated — Valladolid International Film Festival - Golden Spike for Best Film
2017	Berlin Syndrome	Nominated — AACTA Award for Best Direction; Nominated — Dallas International Film Festival Grand Jury Prize - Narrative Feature Competition; Nominated — Sundance Film Festival Grand Jury Prize - World Cinema — Dramatic
