= Sanford J. Greenburger Associates =

- Status: active
- Founded: 1932
- Founder: Sanford J. Greenburger
- Country of origin: United States
- Headquarters location: 55 Fifth Avenue, New York City, United States
- Key people: Heidi Lange (President), Dan Mandel (Vice President)
- Fiction genres: general fiction, nonfiction, children's, young adult
- Official website: https://www.greenburger.com

Sanford J. Greenburger Associates is a major New York literary agency. It represents a wide variety of world-renowned writers, including Franz Kafka, Jean-Paul Sartre, as well as contemporary best-selling authors, such as Dan Brown and Nelson Demille.

The agency was founded in 1932 by Sanford J. Greenburger, an agent who pioneered book scouting, and was a privately owned company until 1971. Following Greenburger's death in 1971, the agency became a partnership owned by the affiliated agents. It currently has eleven partner agents, a foreign rights director, and support staff.

Sanford J. Greenburger Associates is known as a prestige launch pad for literary agents and book editors, many of whom began their publishing careers as assistants or junior agents at the agency. Several former high-level editors and publishers have also joined the agency's staff.
