= Murali K. Thalluri =

Film director, writer, and producer

Murali K. Thalluri (born 4 August 1984) is an Australian film director, writer, and producer. His production and financing company was called M2 Entertainment (M2E).

== Early life and education ==
Murali K. Thalluri was born on 4 August 1984 in Canberra to Indian-born (Telugu) parents, called Rajkiran and Jyoti. They moved to Adelaide, South Australia, where Thalluri attended Rostrevor College and then completed high school at University Senior College.

As a child, Thalluri was hospitalised for long periods with kidney and bladder problems, and at the age of 15 was mugged and stabbed by around 15 "kids" while he was in a telephone booth, causing the loss of one eye.

His parents had wanted him to become a doctor, but he commenced a bachelor of business administration at the University of South Australia while working for the Australian Taxation Office, before deciding that he wanted to make films.

== Career ==
In 2006 Thalluri, along with cinematographer Nick Matthews, set up the company M2 Entertainment (M2E) as a film production and financing company in order to make his first feature film. 2:37, starring Teresa Palmer, a film about teen suicide, was completed when he was 22 years old and financed on a tiny budget via private funding. The psychological drama was very successful, making Thalluri "an overnight success story". It was also the first feature film by Adelaide film production company Kojo, produced by company founder Kent Smith. It was an Official Selection at the 2006 Cannes Film Festival. and screened at the Melbourne and Toronto International Film Festivals. Thalluri said that he used elements of his friend's suicide and his own attempted suicide, which caused controversy after some accused him of lying about this.

In August 2010, Thalluri relaunched M2E, with the aim of financing or co-financing two feature films and two short films annually until 2014. The board included Nick Matthews, producer Nick Selth, Ian Gibbins of Arclight Films, producer Scott Mosier, sound mixers Leslie Shatz and Chris David, and Michelle Krumm, who had previously worked for Miramax and Weinstein.

His second film, Jewel, was due to start filming in February 2011. Set in India, the project was about two boys forced to work in a slave labour camp.

In June 2013, Kojo announced a deal with American company Main Street Films, to collaborate on an upcoming feature film that would be a co-production between Kojo and Thalluri from M2E, with South African company Enigma Pictures as the co-producer. The film, titled One, was described as "a racially fuelled post-apocalyptic adventure as seen through the eyes of a 26-year old girl", and was set to be filmed in South Africa and produced by Kent Smith. Main Street announced cast members at Cannes Film Festival in 2014, As of November 2025, One is still listed on IMDb as "in development".

In February 2019 Kirk Shaw, CEO of entertainment company Wonderfilm, announced that they would be backing a new film by Thalluri titled Run, about "an American girl and Indian boy both sold into slavery and forced to run for the their lives". Cinematographer Lance Gewer (Tsotsi) was attached to the project, with the film to be produced by Wonderfilm and Kojo's Kent Smith along with Thalluri.

== Filmography ==
- 2:37 (2006)
