= God on My Side =

- Directed by: Andrew Denton
- Written by: Andrew Denton
- Produced by: Jon Casimir; Anita Jacoby
- Release date: 2 November 2006
- Running time: 85 minutes
- Country: Australia
- Language: English

God on My Side is a documentary directed and produced by Australian agnostic Andrew Denton which follows his trip to the 2006 National Religious Broadcasters Convention in Texas. The 63rd National Religious Broadcasters Convention delegates comprised some 6,000 Christian communicators.

God on My Side premiered at the 53rd Sydney Film Festival on 15 June 2006 and was released in Australian cinemas on 2 November 2006. It was broadcast as a TV special on ABC on 21 May 2007.

Andrew Denton interviews attenders their opinion on abortion, homosexuality, environmental issues, future of religious TV media and movies, influence of religions on politics, rapture, separation of church and state, fundamental truths about God, and other matters. Opinions of the interviewees mostly present views of fundamentalist Christians.
