= Teresa Palmer =

Australian actress

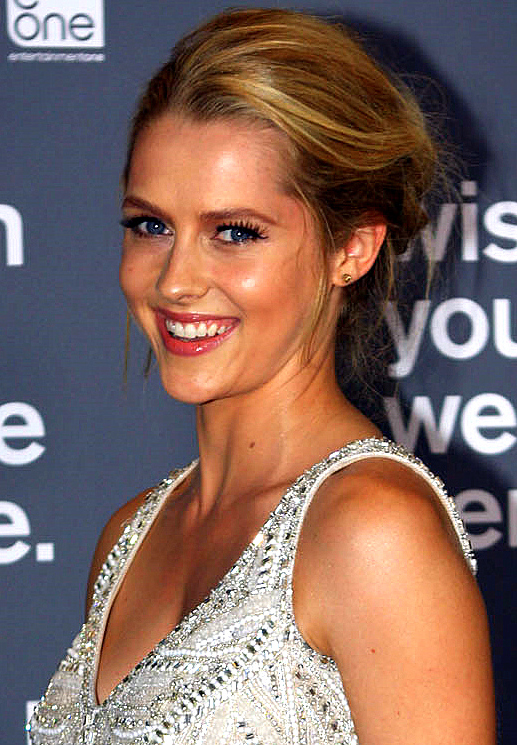
- Palmer in 2012
- Born: Teresa Mary Palmer; February 26, 1986 (age 40); Adelaide, South Australia
- Occupations: Actress; model; podcaster
- Years active: 2003–present
- Spouse: Mark Webber (m. 2013)
- Children: 5
- Relatives: Cheri Honkala (mother-in-law)

Teresa Mary Palmer (born February 26, 1986) is an Australian actress. Following her film debut in Wolf Creek (2005), Palmer had supporting roles in films such as The Grudge 2 (2006), Bedtime Stories (2008), The Sorcerer's Apprentice (2010), I Am Number Four, Take Me Home Tonight (both 2011), Knight of Cups (2015), Triple 9 (2016), The Choice (2016), and The Fall Guy (2024).

Her performance as a depressed teenager in the psychological drama film 2:37 (2006) was critically praised, for which she was nominated for the AACTA Award for Best Actress in a Leading Role. For her portrayal of Dorothy Schutte in the epic biographical war film Hacksaw Ridge (2016), she was nominated for the AACTA International Award for Best Supporting Actress. Palmer would later gain nominations in the Leading Role category for Berlin Syndrome (2017) and Ride Like a Girl (2019). She had starring roles in the horror films Warm Bodies (2013), Lights Out (2016), and The Twin (2022).

Palmer co-wrote, co-produced, and starred in the drama film The Ever After (2014), which was directed by her husband, Mark Webber. She is also known for her leading roles as Diana Bishop on the Sky One and Sky Max fantasy drama series A Discovery of Witches (2018–2022) and Freya Heywood on the Disney+ psychological thriller miniseries The Clearing (2023), which earned her a nomination for the AACTA Award for Best Lead Actress in a Television Drama.

== Early life and education ==
Teresa Mary Palmer was born and raised in Adelaide, South Australia. Her parents separated when she was three, and divorced in 1992 when she was six. She has a stepmother, Karen Palmer, as well as two half-sisters and three stepbrothers, who lived with her father. Palmer has said that she came from "humble beginnings"; she lived in public housing with her mother, while regularly visiting her father at his farm near Mylor in the Adelaide Hills (which she later purchased as an adult). Palmer was named after Mother Teresa by her mother, and has stated that she had a "tough upbringing" due to her mother's manic depression.

Palmer was a student at Mercedes College, a private Catholic day school.

She won a local casting audition, "Search for a Movie Star," in 2003. Her first acting job was dressing up as a Strawberry Shortcake doll and as an elf assistant to mall Santa Clauses on weekends for promotions in shopping centres near Adelaide. She went to acting classes for a couple of years and appeared in several television commercials. She worked various part-time jobs, including as a fast-food attendant at Hungry Jack's in Rundle Mall in 2005, and clothing retailers Supré, Mambo Australia, and Cotton On.

Palmer initially thought that she would work in an animal rescue service after leaving school, and eventually open her own animal welfare agency. However, after graduating from high school, she was accepted into university to study teaching, but had always dreamt of acting. While doing course on journalism, she got a call from an agent about appearing in a student film, 2:37, after the director had seen her head shot on the acting agency's website. Palmer dropped out of university to work on the film.

== Career ==
=== 2005–2006: Beginnings in Australia ===
Palmer had been an extra on Deck Dogz (2005) and other films shot in Adelaide. At the age of 18, she was cast by filmmaker Murali K. Thalluri in the independent Australian film 2:37, about a tragic high school suicide. She was nominated for the 2006 Australian Film Institute Award for Best Lead Actress for her performance. She then signed with a talent agent in Sydney. A role in a pool party scene followed in Wolf Creek (2005).

Palmer starred in the psychological thriller Restraint, with English actor Stephen Moyer and Calvin Klein model Travis Fimmel. Shot on location around New South Wales in mid-2005, the film was written by Dave Warner and directed by David Denneen. Palmer was named an Australian "star of tomorrow" by Screen International that year. She then starred in December Boys, a coming-of-age film set in the 1960s, based on a novel by Michael Noonan. She played Lucy, who has a romance with Daniel Radcliffe's character in a remote beach town. Palmer studied Dominique Swain's performance in Lolita (1997) to capture her character's overt sexuality. The film began shooting in November 2005 on the south coast of Australia. It was released on 14 September 2007 in the UK and US and 20 September 2007 in Australia and received mixed reviews, and failed at the box office.

2:37 premiered at the 2006 Cannes Film Festival in Un Certain Regard selection. The film received a standing ovation, a turning point for Palmer, giving her confidence in acting as a career. The trip to Cannes led her to meet her manager, David Seltzer, and American talent agents. She signed with the William Morris Agency.

=== 2006–2012: Move to Hollywood ===
Palmer was cast to star with Tom Sturridge in her first American feature, Jumper, a science fiction film directed by Doug Liman. Her part was later recast when the lead characters were rewritten for older actors; her role went to Rachel Bilson. Palmer was devastated from losing the role and returned to Adelaide for a few months. She made her Hollywood feature film debut in The Grudge 2 in 2006, a horror sequel starring Amber Tamblyn and Sarah Michelle Gellar. Palmer described her character, Vanessa, as "the bitchy schoolgirl." The Grudge 2 was released in North America on 13 October 2006 (Friday the 13th) to negative reviews and grossed $70 million worldwide against its $20 million budget.

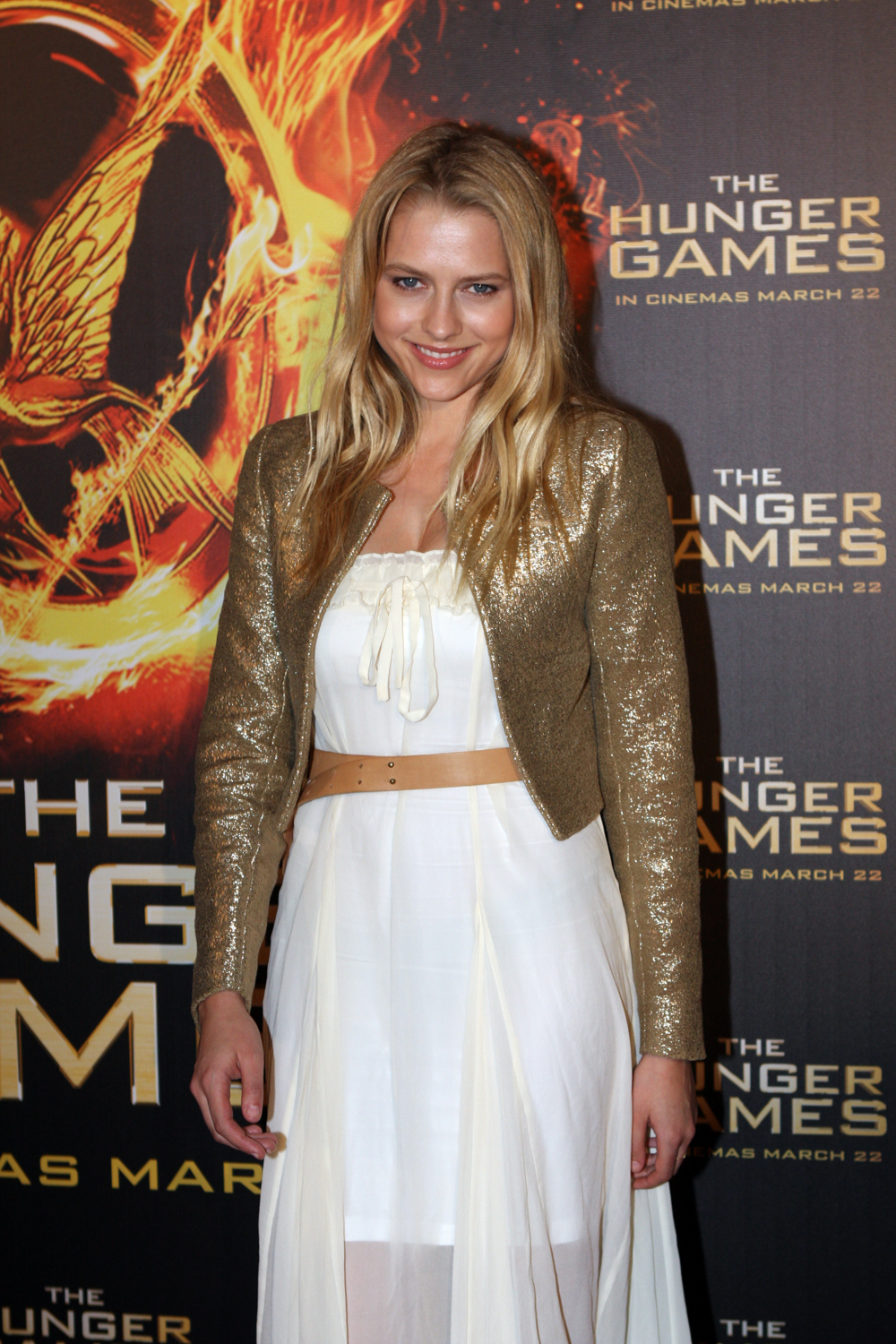
Palmer in 2012 at The Hunger Games Sydney premiere

In early 2007, Palmer was cast as Tori Frederking in the comedy Take Me Home Tonight, starring Anna Faris, Dan Fogler and Topher Grace. Set in the 1980s, the film was directed by Michael Dowse and released in March 2011. Take Me Home Tonight was a box office flop, failing to recoup its $19 million budget. Palmer starred in the film clip for the 2007 single "Breaking Up," by the band Eskimo Joe, shot in Newcastle. Palmer jumps into the sea with the band's singer, Kavyen Temperley.

Palmer relocated from Semaphore Beach in Adelaide to Los Angeles in May 2007 to further her career, and began auditioning for films. She stated that Los Angeles was "a big adjustment" and "very different" from her home in Australia. She went through a period of loneliness and depression, and considered going back home until she made friends there.

In November 2007, Palmer was cast as the villain, Talia al Ghul, in the DC Comics superhero film, Justice League: Mortal, alongside D.J. Cotrona, Adam Brody, Anton Yelchin, Common and Megan Gale. George Miller was set to direct the film, but it was cancelled by Warner Bros. due to script rewrite issues and the 2007–2008 Writers Guild of America strike.

Palmer was the face of Sydney jeweller Jan Logan's "modern darling" collection in 2008. She was picked that year by Adam Sandler from an audition tape to play his love interest in the Walt Disney Pictures children's film, Bedtime Stories. She played an heiress, Violet Nottingham, starring alongside Guy Pearce and Courteney Cox. Sandler also put Palmer's mother and best friend in scenes in the film. It was released on 25 December 2008 and received to negative reviews but grossed $212 million worldwide on its $80 million budget.

Palmer won the romantic lead in Disney's The Sorcerer's Apprentice, produced by Jerry Bruckheimer and directed by Jon Turteltaub. The film was based on the relevant section of the animated film Fantasia (1940), which was set to a short symphonic poem for orchestra by Paul Dukas, L'apprenti sorcier (The Sorcerer's Apprentice, published in 1897, and by far, the best known of Dukas' compositions), all of which were inspired by the eponymous poem by Johann Wolfgang von Goethe. Palmer stayed in Manhattan's West Village while filming for six months. She played Becky Barnes, a college student who is pursued by Dave Stutler (Jay Baruchel), a physics student and apprentice to the wizard Balthazar (Nicolas Cage). It was released on 14 July 2010 to mixed reviews, and grossed $215 million worldwide on its big $150 million budget. In July 2010, Parade Magazine named the film No. 1 on its list of "Biggest Box Office Flops of 2010 (So Far)".

In 2009, Palmer formed the film production company Avakea Productions, with Australian actresses Tahyna Tozzi and Nathalie Kelley. She was a guest judge on MTV Australia, for the Sydney filmmaking talent contest, Optus one80project. She also filmed an ad campaign that year for the Australian jean store, Just Jeans, and became the face and spokesperson for the Jurlique cosmetics company.

In 2011, Palmer starred in the sci-fi adventure film, I Am Number Four, alongside Alex Pettyfer and Dianna Agron. She played Number Six, one of nine aliens hiding out on Earth because her home planet was destroyed. Her character was skilled in martial arts, rode a Ducati motorcycle, and could "phase" her way through solid objects. She went through stunt training for the role, learning to perform flips, sword fight, and do wirework. The film was adapted from a novel that was the first of a six-part series. Palmer signed on to do three movies, if the film became a franchise. The film was released in theatres on 18 February 2011, and was also released in the IMAX format. It received generally negative reviews from critics and grossed $149 million worldwide.

Palmer was going to star in Fury Road, a sequel to the Mad Max series by Australian filmmaker George Miller, but didn't join the cast due to scheduling conflicts. The film was later postponed. Palmer starred in the short film Bear, directed by Nash Edgerton, which competed at the 2011 Cannes Film Festival.

She appeared opposite Joel Edgerton in the independent Australian drama-thriller, Wish You Were Here, directed by Kieran Darcy-Smith. The film began shooting in Sydney in November 2010, and premiered at the 2012 Sundance Film Festival. The film received positive reviews from critics.

She also starred in a comedic short, Quirky Girl, for the website Funny or Die, opposite Aaron Paul.

=== 2013–present: Further recognition and horror films ===
Palmer starred in the 2013 zombie film, Warm Bodies, produced by Summit Entertainment, and based on a young adult novel by Isaac Marion. She played Julie, a human who falls in love with a zombie (Nicholas Hoult). It was released on 1 February 2013 in the United States and on 8 February 2013 in the United Kingdom. It opened to positive reviews and grossed $116 million worldwide.

In February 2013, Palmer was announced as the "global face" of Artistry cosmetics. Palmer then starred in Love and Honor with Liam Hemsworth, an independent romance filmed in mid-2011 in Ann Arbor, Michigan. The film is set in the 1960s during the Vietnam War, and was released in March 2013. It had a limited release on 22 March 2013, receiving negative reviews and only grossed $19 thousand.

In 2014, she co-starred alongside Josh Hartnett, Rosario Dawson and Penn Badgley in the romantic drama Parts per Billion. It was released on video on demand on 20 May 2014, and on home video on 6 June 2014. It received negative reviews from critics. Palmer had two films that premiered at the 2014 Toronto International Film Festival, Cut Bank (2014) and Kill Me Three Times (2015), both of which received negative reviews from critics. She played the love interest to Liam Hemsworth and Billy Bob Thornton's daughter in Cut Bank and an assassin in Kill Me Three Times opposite Simon Pegg, Alice Braga and Luke Hemsworth. The latter film was released on 10 April 2015. She starred with Melissa Leo and Phoebe Tonkin in The Ever After, directed by her husband Mark Webber. Written by Palmer and Webber, it is a love story that explores the depths of marriage.

In 2015, she appeared in the Terrence Malick-directed film Knight of Cups, starring Christian Bale. The film premiered in the main competition section at the 65th Berlin International Film Festival in February 2015. Knight of Cups has received mixed reviews from critics. The film was released on 4 March 2016 in the United States by Broad Green Pictures. Palmer had a supporting role in the 2015 remake of Point Break. The film was released in the U.S. on 25 December 2015 and was panned by critics.

In October 2015, it was learned that Palmer would participate in a short film called Too Legit with Zoe Kravitz, Clark Gregg, Nate Corddry and Lauren Weedman. This project was confirmed by the director of the film, Frankie Shaw via Twitter and Instagram and had its premiere on 23 January 2016 at the Sundance Film Festival.

In 2016, she played the female lead role in the adaptation of the Nicholas Sparks novel The Choice, alongside Benjamin Walker, Tom Welling, Alexandra Daddario, and Tom Wilkinson. The film premiered on 5 February 2016 and was panned by critics. She appeared alongside Casey Affleck in the crime–drama heist film, Triple 9 (2016), directed by John Hillcoat. It was released nationwide on 26 February 2016. It was met with mixed reviews and failed to impress at the box office. Also that year, she portrayed Rebecca in the horror film Lights Out, and co-starred in the war drama Hacksaw Ridge, playing the love interest of Andrew Garfield's character; both films received positive reviews, with Palmer's performances being praised. She co-starred in the film Message from the King, alongside Chadwick Boseman, Luke Evans and Alfred Molina.

In 2017, Palmer starred in the psychological thriller Berlin Syndrome, alongside Max Riemelt. She also starred alongside Michiel Huisman and Sam Reid in the science fiction thriller 2:22.

In 2018, Palmer began a starring role as Diana Bishop in the British supernatural drama series A Discovery of Witches. The series received positive reviews. The following year, she starred in the biographical sports film Ride Like a Girl, portraying Michelle Payne. The film was directed by Palmer's Hacksaw Ridge co-star Rachel Griffiths, in her feature film directorial debut.

Palmer starred alongside Bella Heathcote and Philippa Northeast in the 2025 television adaptation of Sally Hepworth's novel The Family Next Door for ABC Television. The six-part drama was filmed in Victoria. Also in 2025, she played a lead role as Alison in Mix Tape, made for Australian streaming service Binge.

In January 2026, she was cast as the Norse goddess Sif for the upcoming Amazon Prime Video live-action adaptation of the two Norse mythology-based video games in the God of War series.

== Personal life ==
Palmer, along with Australian television presenter David Koch, was one of the two number-one ticket holders of the Port Adelaide Football Club starting from 2009, having attended Port Adelaide games since childhood.

Palmer began dating actor and director Mark Webber in late 2012 after contacting him via Twitter. They became engaged in August 2013, and married on 21 December 2013 in Mexico. She and Webber have two sons and three daughters together. Palmer is also a stepmother to Webber's son from his previous relationship with actress Frankie Shaw. In 2013 the family was living in the Beachwood Canyon community of Los Angeles. Cheri Honkala is her mother-in-law.

In November 2012, Palmer and friend Phoebe Tonkin launched the health and wellness website Your Zen Life. She co-founded a sister site to Your Zen Life called Your Zen Mama, with her friend, actress Sarah Wright.

== Filmography ==
=== Film ===
Year	Title	Role	Notes
2005	Wolf Creek	Pool Party Girl	
2006	2:37	Melody	
2006	The Grudge 2	Vanessa Cassidy	
2007	December Boys	Lucy	
2008	Restraint	Dale	
2008	Bedtime Stories	Violet Nottingham	
2010	The Sorcerer's Apprentice	Rebecca "Becky" Barnes	
2011	I Am Number Four	Number Six / Jane Doe	
2011	Take Me Home Tonight	Tori Frederking	
2011	Bear	Emelie	Short film
2011	Quirky Girl	Claire	Short film
2012	Wish You Were Here	Steph McKinney	
2013	Warm Bodies	Julie Grigio	
2013	Love and Honor	Candace	
2014	Cut Bank	Cassandra Steeley	
2014	Parts per Billion	Anna	
2014	The Ever After	Ava	Also writer and producer
2014	Kill Me Three Times	Lucy Webb	
2015	Knight of Cups	Karen	
2015	Point Break	Samsara Dietz	
2016	Too Legit	Kimmie	Short film
2016	The Choice	Gabby Holland	
2016	Triple 9	Michelle Allen	
2016	Lights Out	Rebecca	
2016	Hacksaw Ridge	Dorothy Schutte	
2016	Message from the King	Kelly	
2017	Berlin Syndrome	Clare Havel	
2017	2:22	Sarah	
2019	The Place of No Words	Herself	
2019	Ride Like a Girl	Michelle Payne	
2022	The Twin	Rachel	
2023	Shadow Woman	Brooke	Short film
2024	The Fall Guy	Iggy Starr	
2024	Addition	Grace Vandenburg	
2026	The Get Out	Sunny	
2027	4 Kids Walk Into a Bank †	Nancy	Post-production
TBA	Tecie †	—N/a	Post-production; producer only
TBA	Subversion †	TBA	Post-production
TBA	Michael 2 †	Debbie Rowe	Debut film

Key
†	Denotes films that have not yet been released

=== Television ===
Year	Title	Role	Notes	Ref.
2018–2022	A Discovery of Witches	Diana Bishop	Main role	
2023	The Clearing	Freya Heywood	Main role	
2025	The Last Anniversary	Sophie Honeywell	Main role	
2025	Mix Tape	Alison Connor	Main role	
2025	The Family Next Door	Isabelle Heatherington	Main role	
TBA	God of War †	Sif	Supporting role	

=== Music videos ===
Year	Artist	Title	Notes
2007	Eskimo Joe	"Breaking Up"	
2010	Empire of the Sun	"Half Mast (Slight Return)"	
2011	Atomic Tom	"Don't You Want Me"	
2014	Daniel Ahearn	"Before You Go"	

== Awards and nominations ==
Award	Year	Category	Work / Nominee	Result	Ref.
AACTA Awards	2006	Best Actress in a Leading Role	2:37	Nominated	
AACTA Awards	2016	Best Actress in a Leading Role	Hacksaw Ridge	Nominated	
AACTA Awards	2017	Best Actress in a Leading Role	Berlin Syndrome	Nominated	
AACTA Awards	2019	Best Actress in a Leading Role	Ride Like a Girl	Nominated	
AACTA Awards	2024	Best Lead Actress in Drama	The Clearing	Nominated	
AACTA Awards	2026	Best Lead Actress in Drama	Mix Tape	Pending	
AACTA International Awards	2017	Best Supporting Actress	Hacksaw Ridge	Nominated	
Australian Film Critics Association	2017	Best Actress	Hacksaw Ridge	Nominated	
Australian Film Critics Association	2018	Best Actress	Berlin Syndrome	Nominated	
Australian Film Critics Association	2020	Best Actress	Ride Like a Girl	Nominated	
Australians in Film Awards	2011	Breakthrough Award	Herself	Won (Note: Shared with Joel Edgerton and David Michôd.)	
BloodGuts UK Horror Awards	2016	Best Actress	Lights Out	Nominated	
Critics' Choice Super Awards	2022	Best Actress in a Science Fiction/Fantasy Series	A Discovery of Witches	Nominated	
Film Critics Circle of Australia	2013	Best Supporting Actress	Wish You Were Here	Nominated	
Film Critics Circle of Australia	2017	Best Actress	Berlin Syndrome	Nominated	
Film Critics Circle of Australia	2019	Best Actress	Ride Like a Girl	Nominated	
Maui Film Festival	2015	Rising Star	Herself	Won (Note: Shared with Scott Eastwood.)	
