= 2:37 =

- Theatrical release poster
- Directed by: Murali K. Thalluri
- Written by: Murali K. Thalluri
- Produced by: Kent Smith; Murali K. Thalluri; Nick Remy Matthews
- Starring: Teresa Palmer; Joel Mackenzie; Frank Sweet; Charles Baird; Sam Harris; Marni Spillane; Clementine Mellor
- Cinematography: Nick Remy Matthews
- Edited by: Dale Roberts; Murali K. Thalluri; Nick Remy Matthews
- Music by: Mark Tschanz
- Distributed by: Roadshow Entertainment
- Release dates: 26 May 2006 (Cannes Film Festival); 17 August 2006 (Australia)
- Running time: 95 minutes
- Country: Australia
- Language: English
- Box office: A$447,290

2:37 is a 2006 Australian psychological drama film written, produced and directed by filmmaker Murali K. Thalluri and starring an ensemble cast including Teresa Palmer, Joel Mackenzie, Frank Sweet, Charles Baird, Sam Harris, Marni Spillane and Clementine Mellor. 2:37 was filmed in Adelaide, Australia on location at St. Ignatius' College. The story is narrated by six high school students whose lives are interwoven, each having their own personal problems and goals. The story takes place on an otherwise normal school day, during which, at precisely 2:37, a tragedy will occur.

2:37 had its world premiere at Cannes and its North American premiere at the Toronto International Film Festival. It was released in Australia on 17 August 2006 and received mixed reviews from critics.

== Plot ==
A student hears the sound of someone falling within the disabled bathroom. She signals the custodian, who approaches and sees blood flowing out from under the door.

Marcus is an intelligent student and skilled classical musician who aspires to please his father, whose success he hopes to emulate. Melody, his sister, has symptoms of depression. She is not supported by her parents and has a broken relationship with her father. Luke is a handsome, athletic sportsman who aspires to play premier league soccer. He has a close relationship with Melody, with whom he grew up. Luke's girlfriend, Sarah, is madly in love with him. Sarah is attractive but struggles with an eating disorder. Sean is a dopehead and a social outcast, mostly because of his homosexuality. He is teased by other students, particularly Luke. Steven is a soccer fanatic who recently moved to Australia from England. He has an obvious limp and was born with two urethras, often resulting in his wetting himself.

At school, Melody meets up with Luke. Marcus goes to the music room and begins playing classical music. He is joined by Kelly, who congratulates him on a well-written creative story he wrote for English. When Kelly inquires into the story, Marcus abruptly leaves.

Luke is shown bullying other students and discussing sexual fantasies with his friends. Melody shies away from personal questions about her family, while Sarah discusses how madly in love she is with Luke. Steven is forced to change his pants after wetting himself in class. Sean is deeply frustrated with non-accepting views towards homosexuality, and it is evident that his sexuality is no secret. Marcus is confronted by his English teacher about some disturbing content of his English story.

Melody takes a pregnancy test, and it gives a positive result. As she exits, Sarah, who was in the bathroom throwing up, sees her holding the test. Sarah assumes that Luke has slept around and blames Melody. She tells her friends what she saw. Luke plays soccer, and Steven watches from afar, describing his dreams of being a soccer player. Marcus receives his results for Chemistry (87%) and is very upset at not achieving his desired 90%. He confronts his teacher but is infuriated when she explains there is nothing she can do.

Steven wets his pants again; since he had only one set of spare clothing, he waits in the stall for the stain to dry. Sean sees the school counsellor and describes his parents' unhappiness about his sexual orientation. After the session, he hides in the janitor's room smoking weed; meanwhile, Luke has sex with Sarah.

Sean confronts Luke about why he does not speak to him in public. They kiss, until Luke gets angry with himself and yells at Sean. Sean storms out, angry with Luke for not coming out. All this is overheard by Steven, still in the stall. In his rage, Luke smashes a bathroom door and sees Steven; he punches him in the nose and threatens him not to say anything. Exiting the bathroom with a bloody nose, Steven is comforted by Kelly, who offers him a tissue. In the library, fishing for information, one of Sarah's friends approaches Marcus and 'casually' mentions that his sister is pregnant. Marcus is furious; it is revealed in flashback that he raped his sister while their parents were away. He finds and confronts Melody, yelling at and shoving her and demanding to know if it is true. Kelly witnesses this.

It is revealed that it was Kelly who committed suicide. She slits her wrist with scissors and sits sobbing in her blood until she dies. Each of the characters comments on Kelly. Luke says, "sometimes we get so wrapped up in our own problems that we don't notice others". Sean contemplates the afterlife; Sarah is upset that the last time she spoke to Kelly was ten years ago. Steven says that he will miss her because she was his friend; Melody notes that Kelly was lucky for having left this world; and Marcus, who was apparently very close friends with Kelly, is frustrated that she did not mention anything.

== Cast ==
- Teresa Palmer as Melody
- Frank Sweet as Marcus
- Sam Harris as Luke
- Charles Baird as Steven
- Joel Mackenzie as Sean
- Marni Spillane as Sarah
- Clementine Mellor as Kelly
- Sarah Hudson as Julz
- Gary Sweet as Mr. Darcy
- Amy Schapel as Lacey
- Xavier Samuel as Theo
- Chris Olver as Tom

== Production ==
The director says he was inspired to make the film by a suicide of a friend and his own suicide attempt.

== Reception ==
The film encountered early commercial success, generating more than three times its production costs in distribution sales. Another victory for the film was a 17-minute standing ovation at the 2006 Cannes Film Festival.

Critics and audiences were divided in their reaction, particularly regarding the graphic teenage suicide scene at the end of the film and a rape scene between a brother and a young sister. Some mental health groups described the film as "dangerous", with concerns that it will lead to copycat suicides. Variety's Justin Chang has described it as "A queasy exploitation picture masquerading as a serious dramatic treatment of teen suicide". Preview screenings reportedly led to some audience members walking out or fainting in response to the graphic rape and suicide scenes. Other critics complained that the film is too similar to Gus Van Sant's 2003 film Elephant.

However, some critics praised the movie. Urban Cinefile calls it "a stunning debut" for Thalluri, who made the film at the age of 20. The Age's Tracee Hutchison described the film as "beautiful," saying that it "should be screened to year 11 and 12 students in every high school", although the film's R18+ rating in Australia means that this cannot legally occur. The film's rating has been very disappointing for Thalluri, who has been quoted as being "gutted" that the intended audience of young teenagers will not have the opportunity to view the film. Thalluri has stated that the purpose of the suicide scene was to depict the suffering and regret of the suicide victim, and to dispel any implication that the act of suicide is easy or simple.

Further controversy has arisen around Thalluri's claims that the movie was written about a friend Kelly Mason, who sent him a video suicide note before taking her life. Investigations by The Australian questioned the existence of Thalluri's friend, as well as other statements he has made about events in his own life which led to the film's creation. His cousin Ann has publicly defended his story and Thalluri himself called the claims "offensive", "rude" and "ridiculous".

=== Box office ===
2:37 grossed $447,290 at the box office in Australia.

== Festivals ==
- 2006 – France – Cannes Film Festival
- 2006 – Canada – Toronto International Film Festival
- 2006 – Australia – Melbourne International Film Festival (Opening Night Selection)
- 2006 – Japan – Tokyo International Film Festival
- 2006 – United States – AFI Film Festival (American Film Institute Festival)
- 2006 – India – Osians International Film Festival
- 2006 – Greece – Thessaloniki International Film Festival
- 2007 – Turkey – International Istanbul Film Festival
- 2007 – United States – Philadelphia International Gay & Lesbian Film Festival

== Awards ==
Nominated:

- 2006 Cannes Film Festival: Un Certain Regard (Murali K. Thalluri).
- 2006 Australian Film Institute Awards: Best Original Screenplay, Best Actress in a Leading Role (Teresa Palmer), AFI Young Actor Award (Frank Sweet).

== See also ==
- Cinema of Australia
