= Logie Award for Most Outstanding Actor =

Australian annual TV award

- Country: Australia
- Presented by: TV Week
- First award: 1988
- Currently held by: Patrick Brammall (2023)

Highlights
- Most awards: Richard Roxburgh (3)
- Website: tvweeklogieawards.com.au

The Silver Logie for Most Outstanding Actor is an award presented annually at the Australian TV Week Logie Awards. It was first awarded at the 30th Annual TV Week Logie Awards in 1988 and is given to recognise the outstanding performance of an actor in an Australian program. The winner and nominees of this award are chosen by television industry juries. Richard Roxburgh holds the record for the most wins, with three.

== Winners and nominees ==
Key	Meaning
‡	Indicates the winning actor

Year	Nominees	Program(s)	Network	Ref
1988	John Wood‡	Rafferty's Rules	Seven Network	
1989	John Wood‡	Rafferty's Rules	Seven Network	
1990	Shane Porteous‡	A Country Practice	Seven Network	
1991	Michael Craig‡	G.P.	ABC TV	
1992	John McTernan‡	G.P.	ABC TV	
1993	Gary Sweet‡	Police Rescue	ABC TV	
1994	Garry McDonald‡	Mother and Son	ABC TV	
1995	Chris Haywood‡	Janus	ABC TV	
1996	Richard Roxburgh‡	Blue Murder	ABC TV	
1997	Colin Friels‡	Water Rats	Nine Network	
1998	Tony Martin‡	Wildside	ABC TV	
1998	Colin Friels	Water Rats	Nine Network	
1998	William McInnes	Blue Heelers	Seven Network	
1998	Rob Sitch	Frontline	ABC TV	
1999	Tony Martin‡	Wildside	ABC TV	
1999	David Wenham‡	SeaChange	ABC TV	
1999	Colin Friels	Water Rats	Nine Network	
1999	Paul Mercurio	The Day of the Roses	Network Ten	
1999	Jeremy Sims	Aftershocks	SBS TV	
2000	William McInnes‡	SeaChange	ABC TV	
2000	Steve Bisley	Water Rats	Nine Network	
2000	Colin Friels	Water Rats	Nine Network	
2000	John Howard	SeaChange	ABC TV	
2001	John Howard‡	SeaChange	ABC TV	
2001	Steve Bisley	Water Rats	Nine Network	
2001	William McInnes	SeaChange	ABC TV	
2001	Geoff Morrell	Grass Roots	ABC TV	
2002	William McInnes‡	My Brother Jack	Network Ten	
2002	Joel Edgerton	The Secret Life of Us	Network Ten	
2002	Geoff Morrell	Changi	ABC TV	
2002	Matthew Newton	Changi	ABC TV	
2002	Charles 'Bud' Tingwell	Changi	ABC TV	
2003	Peter O'Brien‡	White Collar Blue	Network Ten	
2003	Shane Bourne	MDA	ABC TV	
2003	John Howard	Always Greener	Seven Network	
2003	Samuel Johnson	The Secret Life of Us	Network Ten	
2003	Gary Sweet	Stingers	Nine Network	
2004	Ray Barrett‡	After the Deluge	Network Ten	
2004	Tim Draxl	The Shark Net	ABC TV	
2004	Abe Forsythe	Marking Time	ABC TV	
2004	William McInnes	The Shark Net	ABC TV	
2004	Gary Sweet	Stingers	Nine Network	
2004	David Wenham	After the Deluge	Network Ten	
2005	Sam Neill‡	Jessica	Network Ten	
2005	Brendan Cowell	Love My Way	Fox8	
2005	Abe Forsythe	Fireflies	ABC TV	
2005	Tony Martin	Jessica	Network Ten	
2005	Dan Wyllie	Love My Way	Fox8	
2006	Dan Wyllie‡	Love My Way	Fox8	
2006	Brendan Cowell	Love My Way	Fox8	
2006	John Howard	All Saints	Seven Network	
2006	Alex O'Loughlin	The Incredible Journey of Mary Bryant	Network Ten	
2006	John Wood	Blue Heelers	Seven Network	
2007	Matthew Le Nevez‡	The Society Murders	Network Ten	
2007	Ben Mendelsohn	Love My Way	W. Channel	
2007	Richard Roxburgh	The Silence	ABC TV	
2007	David Wenham	Answered by Fire	ABC TV	
2007	Dan Wyllie	Love My Way	W. Channel	
2008	Stephen Curry‡	The King	TV1	
2008	Don Hany	East West 101	SBS TV	
2008	Chris Lilley	Summer Heights High	ABC1	
2008	William McInnes	Curtin	ABC1	
2008	William McInnes	East West 101	SBS TV	
2009	Gyton Grantley‡	Underbelly	Nine Network	
2009	Dustin Clare	Satisfaction	Showcase	
2009	Vince Colosimo	Underbelly	Nine Network	
2009	Callan Mulvey	Rush	Network Ten	
2009	Damian Walshe-Howling	Underbelly	Nine Network	
2010	Don Hany‡	East West 101	SBS TV	
2010	Roy Billing	Underbelly: A Tale of Two Cities	Nine Network	
2010	Garry McDonald	A Model Daughter: The Killing of Caroline Byrne	Network Ten	
2010	Ben Mendelsohn	Tangle	Showcase	
2010	Aaron Pedersen	The Circuit	SBS TV	
2011	Richard Roxburgh‡	Rake	ABC1	
2011	Jason Gann	Wilfred	SBS TV	
2011	Richard Roxburgh	Hawke	Network Ten	
2011	Hugh Sheridan	Packed to the Rafters	Seven Network	
2011	Erik Thomson	Packed to the Rafters	Seven Network	
2012	Rob Carlton‡	Paper Giants: The Birth of Cleo	ABC1	
2012	Alex Dimitriades	The Slap	ABC1	
2012	Don Hany	East West 101	SBS TV	
2012	Geoff Morrell	Cloudstreet	Showcase	
2012	David Wenham	Killing Time	TV1	
2013	Anthony Hayes‡	Devil's Dust	ABC1	
2013	Aaron Jeffery	Underbelly: Badness	Nine Network	
2013	Guy Pearce	Jack Irish	ABC1	
2013	Jimi Bani	Mabo	ABC1	
2013	Lachy Hulme	Howzat! Kerry Packer's War	Nine Network	
2014	Lachy Hulme‡	Power Games: The Packer-Murdoch Story	Nine Network	
2014	Chris Lilley	Ja'mie: Private School Girl	ABC1	
2014	Craig McLachlan	The Doctor Blake Mysteries	ABC1	
2014	Kirk Page	Redfern Now	ABC1	
2014	David Wenham	Better Man	SBS One	
2015	Luke Arnold‡	INXS: Never Tear Us Apart	Seven Network	
2015	Martin Henderson	Secrets & Lies	Network Ten	
2015	John Noble	Devil's Playground	Showcase	
2015	Richard Roxburgh	Rake	ABC	
2015	Ashley Zukerman	The Code	ABC	
2016	Alex Dimitriades‡	The Principal	ABC	
2016	Hugh Dancy	Deadline Gallipoli	Showcase	
2016	Malcolm Kennard	Catching Milat	Seven Network	
2016	Patrick Brammall	Glitch	ABC	
2016	Sam Neill	House of Hancock	Nine Network	
2017	Henry Nixon‡	The Kettering Incident	ABC	
2017	Rodger Corser	Doctor Doctor	Nine Network	
2017	Samuel Johnson	Molly	Seven Network	
2017	Richard Roxburgh	Rake	ABC	
2017	Noah Taylor	Deep Water	SBS	
2018	Hugo Weaving‡	Seven Types of Ambiguity	ABC	
2018	Damon Herriman	Riot	ABC	
2018	Ewen Leslie	Safe Harbour	SBS	
2018	Lachy Hulme	Romper Stomper	Stan	
2018	Rodger Corser	Doctor Doctor	Nine Network	
2019	Scott Ryan‡	Mr Inbetween	Foxtel	
2019	Aaron Pedersen	Mystery Road	ABC	
2019	Bryan Brown	Bloom	Stan	
2019	Jay Ryan	Fighting Season	Foxtel	
2019	Robbie Magasiva	Wentworth	Foxtel	
2022	Richard Roxburgh‡	Fires	ABC	
2022	Hugo Weaving	Love Me	Binge/Foxtel	
2022	Jamie Dornan	The Tourist	Stan	
2022	Sam Reid	The Newsreader	ABC	
2022	Scott Ryan	Mr Inbetween	Foxtel	
2023	Patrick Brammall‡	Colin From Accounts	Binge	
2023	Mark Coles Smith	Mystery Road: Origin	ABC	
2023	Richard Roxburgh	Bali 2002	Stan	
2023	Sam Neill	The Twelve	Binge/Foxtel	
2023	Tim Draxl	In Our Blood	ABC	
2023	Tim Minchin	Upright	Binge/Foxtel	

== Multiple wins ==
Number	Actor
Wins
3	Richard Roxburgh
2	John Wood
2	Tony Martin
2	William McInnes

== Programs with most awards ==
Wins	Program
3	SeaChange
2	Rafferty's Rules
2	G.P.
2	Wildside
