= Rake (American TV series) =

2013 TV series

- Genre: Black comedy; Comedy drama; Legal drama
- Based on: Rake by Peter Duncan (Australian series)
- Developed by: Peter Tolan; Peter Duncan
- Starring: Greg Kinnear; John Ortiz; Necar Zadegan; Bojana Novakovic; Tara Summers; Miranda Otto; Ian Colletti
- Composer: Patric Caird
- Country of origin: United States
- Original language: English
- No. of seasons: 1
- No. of episodes: 13

Production
- Executive producers: Greg Kinnear; Ian Collie; Lesly Tolan; Michael Wimer; Peter Duncan; Peter Tolan; Richard Roxburgh; Sam Raimi
- Camera setup: Single-camera
- Running time: 42 minutes
- Production companies: Blow by Blow Productions; Essential Media and Entertainment; Fedora Entertainment; Sony Pictures Television

Original release
- Network: Fox
- Release: January 23 – June 27, 2014

Rake is an American comedy-drama television series and an adaptation of the Australian series of the same name, both of which are created by Peter Duncan. Duncan served as series producer with, among others, star Greg Kinnear, Peter Tolan, and Richard Roxburgh, on this version for Fedora Entertainment, Essential Media and Entertainment, and Sony Pictures Television. On May 8, 2013, the series was added to the Fox network's 2013–14 schedule as a mid-season entry. The series premiered on January 23, 2014, originally airing Thursdays on the network, before moving to Fridays late in the first season and eventually to Saturdays for the final two episodes. On May 7, 2014, Fox canceled the series after one season, but ultimately aired the produced episodes.

== Premise ==
The series follows Keegan Deane, a criminal defense lawyer whose personal problems and self-destructive behavior have him battling wits and owing money to everyone around him, including his ex-wife, judges, an assistant district attorney, his bookie, a brothel owner, and the IRS.

== Cast and characters ==
=== Main cast ===
- Greg Kinnear as Keegan Deane, the titular rake
- Miranda Otto as Maddy Deane, Keegan's ex-wife and a psychiatrist
- John Ortiz as Ben Leon, Keegan's best friend from law school
- Necar Zadegan as Scarlet Leon, Ben's wife and an ADA for Los Angeles
- Bojana Novakovic as Michaela "Mikki" Partridge, a $500-an-hour prostitute, with whom Keegan develops a romantic interest, who disappears and then turns up as a law student.
- Tara Summers as Leanne Zander, Keegan's personal assistant
- Jeffrey Nordling as Bruce Mangan, Maddy Deane's new boyfriend
- Ian Colletti as Finn Deane, Keegan's teenage son

=== Recurring cast ===
- Omar Dorsey as Roy, Keegan's creditor who routinely beats him on behalf of the loan shark to whom Deane owes a considerable amount of money. Keegan holds no grudges and the two men are otherwise friendly.
- Anne Gee Byrd as Frances Leon, Ben's mother, who despises Deane
- Cedric Yarbrough as Jules, Mikki's flamboyant former pimp
- Elizabeth Ho as Debbie Lee, daughter of a creditor to whom Deane owed money. She has inherited the family business and forces Keegan to rent an apartment her aunt owns in Echo Park and has threatened to have her cousins break his legs if he doesn't pay up.
- Damon Gupton as Mayor of Los Angeles Marcus Barzmann
- Kim Hawthorne as Gloria Barzmann

== Production ==
The early episodes were aired out of order, as the original pilot, written by Peter Duncan and directed by Sam Raimi, had "an overload of not drama ... but maybe a little sadness," according to producer Peter Tolan. He added, "[it] worked against the episode. And so we refigured it, sort of toning that down". The episode originally portrays Keegan Deane (Greg Kinnear) in an unhealthy mental and physical state.

Episode 13, "Mammophile", should be viewed after episode 5, "Bigamist", to maintain continuity.

== Critical reception ==
Rake scored 62 out of 100 on Metacritic based on reviews from 33 critics, indicating "generally favorable" reviews. Rotten Tomatoes gives the show a rating of 66%, based on 38 reviews, with the site's consensus stating: "Rake's smart blend of comedy and drama makes it the perfect vehicle for Greg Kinnear's offbeat charm and dry humor".

Hank Stuever (The Washington Post) gave it a B+ grade, positing that "House comparisons will surely abound, but Rake is easily one of the more confident network dramas to come our way of late. It's a procedural ... but it's just unorthodox enough to make me eager to see more." The Los Angeles Times' Mary McNamara stated "Rake owes more to the increasingly humane tone of family and female-based comedies like Modern Family and Parks and Recreation than Rescue Me, which could (fingers crossed) indicate a similar journey to the light for the ever-popular tortured white male." Jeff Jensen from Entertainment Weekly awarded the series a B grade, stating "Rake is yet another show that tries to entertain us with a boorish, morally sketchy protagonist. Comparisons have been made to House or cable drama cads like Don Draper, but it's the differences from the 'Unlikeable Antihero' archetypes of current TV that define the show."

Not all reviews were favorable: James Poniewozik of Time stated "You get the sense that the show ... is vacillating. Maybe it wants to be the kind of raw indictment/worship of reckless masculinity we've seen on cable. Or maybe it wants to be a more picaresque version of House, with a little less genius and a little more self-degradation." The Huffington Post's Maureen Ryan said "Part of the problem is Rake's diffidence about how bad a guy Keane is supposed to be. He's clearly a raging narcissist, yet the show deflects that aspect of his personality and tries to make him seem a little bit adorable. If we're supposed to fear that the worst aspects of his personality will land him in serious trouble, the tidy resolutions of various story points in the pilot seem to preclude that possibility ... Rake isn't a bad show, it just doesn't appear to have the courage of its convictions."

== Episodes ==
No.	Title	Directed by	Written by	Original release date	Prod. code	U.S. viewers (millions)
1	"Serial Killer"	Sam Raimi	Peter Duncan	January 23, 2014	RAK102	6.95
Criminal defense attorney Keegan Deane (Greg Kinnear) tries to balance his personal and professional life. After winning a poker game, he must enter a guilty plea for serial killer Jack Tarrant (Peter Stormare). At trial, Tarrant contradicts Deane and enters a not-guilty plea, accusing LAPD's Chief of Police Bernie Michaels (Bill Smitrovich) of being the author of Tarrant's written confessions to nine murders. Deane must sort out the truth, putting him at odds with the city's mayor and those working for him. Outside the trial, Deane totes around a Pacific bluefin tuna as payment from a client. He attempts to sell it in order to pay on his gambling debt. When the first potential buyer downgrades the quality of the fish and their offer, he refuses to accept the lower offer. He ends up cooking and eating the tuna himself with his friends.
2	"A Close Shave"	Scott Winant	Allison Abner	January 30, 2014	RAK104	5.24
Keegan takes the case of three California Conservative Mennonites who attack an elder who tries to take a woman member back home to Lancaster, Pennsylvania. The three were arrested for attempted murder, but Keegan learns they merely tried to shave off the elder's beard as customary punishment. During the trial, it is revealed the elder did the same to another man who modernized a tractor. The elder simply does not accept the Californians using cell phones and driving delivery vans for their bakery business. The three are sentenced to six months in prison on the lesser charge of assault and reconcile with the victim as per the Amish doctrine of forgiveness. Meanwhile, without a vehicle, Keegan takes Maddy's advice and uses a service whereby drivers transport non drivers or non car owners where they need to go based on geographical proximity. Thus, he meets Brooke (Alexandra Breckenridge), an attractive female driver. He is taken with her until she has sex with Ben's father—she has a weakness for older men—at the Leons' recommitment ceremony. The older man suffers a serious stroke, which later proves fatal.
3	"Cancer"	Jon Avnet	Sara Goodman	February 6, 2014	RAK103	4.27
A young mother, Carol Grady (Annie Mumolo), gets arrested for insurance fraud when she portrays her healthy son as a cancer patient. When Keegan learns she is a gambling addict using the checks to feed it, he tries to tap into the jury's own addictions and sympathies. Outside the trial, Keegan promises his son Finn (Ian Colletti) that Tony Hawk, a poker buddy, will make an appearance at his school, which becomes a broken promise.
4	"Cannibal"	Sam Raimi	Allison Abner & Sara Goodman	February 13, 2014	RAK101	4.04
Keegan attends the funeral of Ben's father, but listens to a football game he has wagered on during a eulogy. Ben asks him to take the case of Graham Murray (Denis O'Hare), the mayor's economic advisor, accused of murdering and eating Paul Wilson. Keegan tries to get his client to plead insanity, but Murray tells Keegan that Wilson committed suicide. Murray had a recorded phone confession to that fact, but Keegan learns that Murray's furious wife destroyed the phone. Keegan must convince the jury the confession was distributed to Wilson's sister. Elsewhere, Mikki (Bojana Novakovic) quits the prostitution business and vanishes. Keegan spots her by coincidence while researching the Murray case, and she tells him their relationship was strictly "business". He refuses to accept that.
5	"Bigamist"	Cherie Nowlan	Kit Boss	February 20, 2014	RAK105	3.97
Celebrity chef Alberto Rinaldi (Michael Imperioli) is charged with having two wives. Keegan asserts in court that Rinaldi is a loving husband and a devoted father, and that it is the two women's fault to assume they were his one true love at some point. A third wife then reveals herself. Outside the trial, Mikki seeks Keegan's help with a former john who is harassing her. He is also thrust into Ben and Scarlet's own dilemmas—his waning desire to remain with his father's law firm and hers with their marriage. (Episode 13, "Mammophile", should be viewed after episode 5, "Bigamist", to maintain continuity.)
6	"Jury Tamperer"	Adam Davidson	Kevin J. Hynes	February 27, 2014	RAK107	3.45
Lucy Marks (Michelle Forbes) has sex with a juror in her daughter's murder trial, in an attempt to gain information from him. This is illegal and Keegan takes her case. Lucy's plan was to create a media frenzy, which the district attorney and the mayor want to avoid. Keegan tries to alienate both the judge (Mary Kay Place) and the women jury members, in order to lose the trial. He also has sex with his client. Ben learns the daughter really did commit said murder. Elsewhere, the mayor discovers his wife's flirtation with Keegan; and the IRS wins a court decision for a huge garnishment of Keegan's salary.
7	"Three Strikes"	Amy Heckerling	Kit Boss	March 6, 2014	RAK108	3.53
Reggie Jarvis (Anthony Anderson), a friend of Keegan's from Alcoholics Anonymous, is charged with a robbery he didn't commit. It is Jarvis's third strike felony; Keegan must somehow defend him without a plea deal, since the mayor has refused those from Keegan. The clever ploy of insulting the judge to the point of contempt and mistrial does the trick. At his financial and career crossroads, Keegan accepts a job at Ben's corporate law firm.
8	"Staple Holes"	Adam Arkin	Kevin J. Hynes	March 14, 2014	RAK109	1.82
Although Keegan begrudgingly joins Ben's law firm, he likes the perks of the job. He also wins his first case, despite Ben's colleagues' preference for a long drawn-out profitable loss. Elsewhere, Scarlet awaits her nomination for district attorney. The mayor is found dead in his bathroom, from autoerotic asphyxiation, by ex-chief of police Bernie, who wants to put the blame on Keegan.
9	"Hey, Good Looking"	Cherie Nowlan	Sara Goodman	March 21, 2014	RAK110	1.90
Holly Phillips (Kate Burton) is charged with killing her husband, and Keegan appeals to everyone's insecurities during her trial. Later, he is charged with the Mayor's murder when evidence is planted in his apartment. This causes Ben and Scarlet to differ in their opinions of him. Meanwhile, Bruce becomes Maddy's stalker and she needs Keegan's help scaring him away.
10	"50 Shades of Gay"	Rosemary Rodriguez	Allison Abner	March 28, 2014	RAK111	1.90
Jules, the pimp who first introduced Keegan to Mikki, becomes his newest client. He is accused of assaulting a powerful Hollywood agent, and Keegan cannot find witnesses willing to help Jules. Meanwhile, Maddy punches Finn's teacher and former lover; Scarlet's campaign stalls; and David Potter gets more serious with Mikki.
11	"Remembrance of Taxis Past"	Roxann Dawson	Kit Boss	April 5, 2014	RAK112	1.00
Keegan asks California's ex-governor, Mitch Markham, to provide financial and political support for Scarlet's campaign for district attorney. Meanwhile, Keegan is dumbstruck when Maddy enlists Glenn, a well-known campaign consultant, to liven up Scarlet's campaign, and David Potter, Mikki's fiancée, becomes Scarlet's staunchest opponent.
12	"A Man's Best Friend"	Jeffrey Walker	Peter Duncan	April 5, 2014	RAK113	1.02
A close friend of Keegan's and well-respected doctor is accused of animal cruelty, after an explicit video of him, his wife and his dog gets stolen. Meanwhile, Scarlet and David's campaigns turn ugly when personal information gets leaked to the press; Ben's firm's finances get investigated by the feds; and Maddy renews a relationship with a former girlfriend.
13	"Mammophile"	Paul Edwards	Sam Catlin	June 27, 2014	RAK106	1.28
A young boy gets to spend the day with Keegan after his father makes a winning bid at an auction. A middle-aged mama's boy can't tell his mother he was arrested for being a peeping tom and for indecent exposure. (Episode 13, "Mammophile", should be viewed after episode 5, "Bigamist", to maintain continuity.)
