= Charles Waterstreet =

Australian barrister, author, and producer

- Born: Charles Christian Waterstreet; 17 July 1950; Albury, New South Wales, Australia
- Occupations: Barrister and author

Charles Christian Waterstreet (born 17 July 1950) is a former Australian barrister, an author, and theatre and film producer.

He has written two memoirs and produced two films, and he is now a columnist for The Sydney Morning Herald after the NSW Bar Association cancelled his practising certificate. He is known as one of the co-creators of the ABC Television series Rake. However, co-creator and actor Richard Roxburgh asserted in 2017 that Waterstreet had only contributed one idea to a single episode.

== Early life and education ==
Born in Albury, New South Wales, to publican parents, Waterstreet was educated at Waverley College and the University of Sydney where he earned a Bachelor of Arts in English, History and Political Science in 1971, and a Bachelor of Laws in 1974. During his time at university, he resided at St John's College and later at St Andrew's College.

== Career ==
=== Legal career ===
Waterstreet began his career teaching public law at the University of New South Wales from 1974 to 1978. In 1974, he was admitted to the bar and practised part-time, defending people charged with protest and homosexuality offences. He practised as a barrister, mainly in criminal law, at Forbes Chambers in Sydney until July 2016.

In April 2018, Waterstreet declared bankruptcy, following an order to pay $A420,000 in back taxes.

In May 2019, the Council of The New South Wales Bar Association reprimanded Waterstreet for "Unsatisfactory Professional Conduct". Waterstreet "improperly, irrelevantly and offensively referred to the nationalities of two witnesses" and "made a number of factual assertions for which there were no proper basis in the evidence at trial". Following this reprimand, the Council decided to suspend Waterstreet's legal licence.

=== Arts career ===
Waterstreet is a theatre and film producer. In 1986, he produced Howling III and in 1990 he produced Blood Oath. Along with Richard Roxburgh and Peter Duncan, he is a co-creator of the ABC TV series Rake. He began a theatrical career in producing the hit Boys Own McBeth with Grahame Bond (Aunty Jack) from 1979 which ran for nearly three years; it played in Los Angeles with an all-Australian cast. In film he co-produced The Marsupials – The Howling III with director Philippe Mora. In 1990 he produced the highly respected Blood Oath which starred Bryan Brown, Russell Crowe and Deborah Kara Unger. The film was successfully released in Japanese theatres in April 1991 and in the United States in June of that year. It was shown at the celebrations to mark the 50th anniversary of the Geneva Convention on 12 August 1999 in Moscow to highlight aspects of international humanitarian law.

Waterstreet has been a member of the Aspen FilmFest Advisory Committee since 1993. In 1996, he produced Next to Nothing with TCN9 and Mushroom Pictures.

He is the author of Precious Bodily Fluids: A Larrikin's Memoir (Hodder Headline Australia and UK, 1998), which was re-issued by Hachette in 2008 as an Australian classic, and its sequel, Repeating the Leaving (Hodder Headline Australia, 2001). He is currently writing his third autobiography, Rake Man.

Waterstreet's legal publications include:

- "Tricks of Memory" – for the Medico-Legal Society of New South Wales, 12 June 1996
- "Inner child is at the mercy of the memory 'therapists'" – review of Richard Guilliatt's book, Talk of the Devil – The Sydney Morning Herald, 2 November 1996
- "Down False Memory Lane – Aspects of Current Law in New South Wales" – Crown Prosecutor's Annual Conference, 15 April 1998
- "Recovered Memory Syndrome – Remembrance of Things Past" – LAAMS Seminar: States of Mind: Forensic Psychiatry & Psychology for Family & Criminal Lawyers, 1 July 1998
- Law for the Public (contributor) – published by Penguin

He is also a regular columnist for The Sun-Herald where he has a weekly feature article in the "Extra" section named "Waterstreetlife". On 12 May 2013 he published an article in the Sydney Morning Herald titled "A Mother's Tale of Heartache", in which he argued that a man convicted of being a ringleader in the gang rapes of seven under-age girls and women in Sydney in 2000 had been disproportionality punished.

Newcastle artist Nigel Milsom won his first Archibald Prize in 2015 for his portrait of Waterstreet, the artist's former defence lawyer.

== Personal life and harassment allegations ==
Waterstreet was married to a woman called Fiona and they had a son, Harry. Both now live in the US and Waterstreet maintains contact with them. Waterstreet had been romantically linked to actress Kate Fitzpatrick. He also dated journalist Gretel Killeen for a short time, and the two remain close friends.

In October 2017, Waterstreet was accused of sexually harassing law student Tina Ni Huang during a job interview in August 2017. The story was broken by New Matilda editor Chris Graham and Nina Funnell, a freelance journalist and activist against rape and sexual assault. Waterstreet denied the accusations.

Fresh claims were made by two women at the end of October 2017: Genevieve Wilks, who worked for Waterstreet as paralegal, and an anonymous law student, referred to as "Anita", who had been interviewed by Waterstreet for a position at his firm.

In 2018, University of Sydney law student Sarah Knight disclosed that she was the pseudonymous "Anita" and joined a complaint taken to the NSW Bar Association by End Rape on Campus Australia, on behalf of Huang, Wilks, and an unnamed third party.

=== Allegations ===
==== Tina Huang ====
In October 2017, Tina Ni Huang provided a sworn statement to New Matilda. An article about her allegations and an article she had written were both published on New Matilda website on 24 October 2017.

Huang was interviewed by Waterstreet for a paralegal position. She claimed in the article she wrote for New Matilda that Waterstreet told her during the interview that he only hired women under 25, and referred to those women as "pretty young things". She also claims that he referred to her (an Asian woman) as a "boat person". Huang's most serious allegation was that during the interview, Waterstreet discussed his sex life in detail and showed her a video of himself engaging in a sex act with two women. A copy of the video was leaked to New Matilda in November 2017.

Huang was hired. Despite reservations, she agreed to take the position. She quit during her first day after being asked to organise dates for Waterstreet and answer e-mails about Waterstreet's personal sex toy purchases.

==== Genevieve Wilks ====
Genevieve Wilks worked for Waterstreet's law firm for 11 months before quitting. Wilks came forward following Huang's allegations. Wilks alleged that Waterstreet watched pornography in the office, showed his staff photos of himself with naked or semi-naked female sex workers, and sent her and other staff inappropriate e-mails. Wilks stated that, "one email he sent to me and two of the other assistants [was] a photo of a penis in a mankini. He just wants to shock people. That is what he would do." She provided a copy of the email to New Matilda. Wilks alleged that she was required to organise payments to sex workers hired by Waterstreet, and send lingerie vouchers to women whom Waterstreet had met on the "sugar baby" website "Seeking Arrangement". She also alleged that Waterstreet made inappropriately sexual comments to her and other staff members, including jokes about looking for her profile on the dating app Tinder.

In addition to the allegations of sexual harassment, Wilks stated that, due to Waterstreet's financial troubles, she and other staff often had their wage payments delayed for weeks at a time, and that she was owed AU$3580 when she resigned. She alleged that Waterstreet prioritised paying for sex workers over paying his staff. She also alleged that it was a running joke in the office that Waterstreet had been disappointed when she was hired over another, more sexually attractive candidate.

== Notable cases ==
Over the course of his career, Waterstreet has appeared as counsel in many high-profile criminal and civil cases in all courts in New South Wales, as well as the High Court of Australia, including social security, murder, drug, sexual assault, false memory and terrorism trials. He has also appeared in cases in Victoria, Tasmania, Queensland, the Australian Capital Territory and Vanuatu at various times in his career. Some of his more prominent cases include:

- R v Barton (1978)
- The Greek Social Security Case (1978–1982)
- R v Miller (1983) (prosecutor)
- R v English (1987)
- R v Adam (1999)
- O'Halloran v The Queen (2001, HCA)
- Chung v The Queen (2001, HCA)
- Glossop v The Queen (2002, HCA)
- R v El-Azzi (2004)
- R v Baladjam & Ors (2008–09)
- Lange v Back & Schwartz (2009)
- Jedah Jodeh v The Queen (2011)
- R v Michael Anthony Ryan (2012)
- R v Khazaal (2012, HCA)
- R v Rogerson & McNamara (2015)
- R v Murphy (aka The Wolf) (2016–18)
- R v Amati (2018)
- R v Minshull (2018)
