= Peter Duncan (director) =

Australian film director and screenwriter

- Born: 8 September 1964 (age 61); Sydney, New South Wales, Australia
- Occupations: Film director, screenwriter
- Years active: 1993–present

Peter Duncan (born 8 September 1964) is an Australian film director and screenwriter. He is best known for his television series Rake, created with frequent collaborator Richard Roxburgh.

Duncan directed the feature films Children of the Revolution (1996), A Little Bit of Soul (1998), Passion (1999) & Unfinished Sky (2007). In 2024, he wrote the script for The Correspondent, based on the life of Australian journalist Peter Greste.

== Biography ==
=== Early life ===
Duncan attended Scots College in Sydney. He studied a Bachelor of Arts/Law at Sydney University. While studying he participated in comedic University Revues. Duncan worked as a paralegal before deciding to pursue a career in film.

After graduating, Duncan attended the Australian Film, Television and Radio School.

=== Career ===
In 1994, Duncan first collaborated with Richard Roxburgh on his graduate short film, A Bit of a Tiff with the Lord. The short follows a priest who returns from Rome to his frail father in Australia.

Duncan's debut feature the Children of the Revolution opened the 1996 Melbourne International Film Festival. The film was inspired by Duncan's grandfather, Sidney Welch, who was both a banker and member of the Communist Party of Australia. Geoffrey Rush portrays a version of Welch in the film. Duncan had the opportunity to first pitch the film to Strictly Ballroom producer Tristram Miall after he was impressed with A Bit of a Tiff with the Lord. The initial draft of the screenplay Duncan took to Miall was 203 pages.

In 1998, Duncan released his sophomore film, dark comedy, A Little Bit of Soul. A year later, Duncan released his third film, Passion, exploring the life of Australian composer Percy Grainger. Duncan and film critic David Stratton called for the Australian Classification Board to review it's rating system after the film was rated R for depicting Sadomasochism.

Producer Ian Collie, who also had prior experiences in the Australian legal industry, approached Duncan to direct an adaptation of Australian Barrister Richard Beasley's novel Hell Has Harbour Views. Duncan adapted and directed the book as a Television film for the Australian Broadcasting Corporation.

Duncan's Australian recontextualisation of 1998 film The Polish Bride, titled Unfinished Sky, was released across 2007 & 8. After the film struggled at the box office, Duncan reflected "they (audiences) need comedies at the moment, so we'll try and make some".

Returning to television film, Duncan directed 2008 sports comedy-drama Valentine's Day. The film follows a struggling country Australian Football League team.

In 2010, Roxburgh and Duncan released their series Rake. The series was said to be loosely based on the stories of Australian barrister Charles Waterstreet, although Roxburgh would later dispute the extent to which these remarks were accurate. Duncan referenced shows like The Sopranos having changed the rules of TV drama and that "people out there who want to see something that's smarter and challenging". After originally being intended as an eight episode miniseries, Rake ran for 5 seasons. Duncan co-wrote the series with Andrew Knight.

In 2014, Duncan was showrunner on an American adaptation of Rake produced by Sony Pictures Television. The series was cancelled after one season in May 2014. Duncan later reflected that he struggled under the more corporate American production environment and the limitations imposed by an episode structure driven by advertisement breaks.

In 2020, Duncan wrote and directed Operation Buffalo. The series was a darkly comic exploration of the events of the British nuclear bomb tests conducted in the 1950s at Maralinga, in outback South Australia.

In 2024, Duncan wrote the screenplay for The Correspondent. The film chronicles the legal battles of Australian journalist Peter Greste in Egypt. It was shortlisted for Betty Roland Prize for Scriptwriting, at the 2026 NSW Premier's Literary Awards.

== Selected filmography ==
- Children of the Revolution (1996)
- A Little Bit of Soul (1998)
- Passion (1999)
- Hell Has Harbour Views (2005)
- Unfinished Sky (2007)
- Rake (2010–2018) Australian TV series
- Operation Buffalo (2020) Australian TV mini-series
