= 1996 Australian Film Institute Awards =

Australian film and television award ceremony

38th Australian Film Institute Awards
- Date: 15 November 1996
- Location: Melbourne Town Hall, Melbourne, Australia

Television/radio coverage
- Networks
- ABC-TV

The 38th Australian Film Institute Awards were awards held by the Australian Film Institute to celebrate the best of Australian films and television of 1996. The awards ceremony was held at Melbourne Town Hall on Friday 15 November 1996 and broadcast on ABC-TV.

== Feature film ==
Best Film: Shine — Jane Scott; Children of the Revolution — Tristram Miall; Love & Other Catastrophes — Stavros Efthymiou; Mr Reliable — Jim McElroy, Terry Hayes, Michael Hamlyn	Best Direction: Scott Hicks — Shine; Peter Duncan — Children of the Revolution; Clara Law — Floating Life; Paul Cox — Lust and Revenge
Best Lead Actor: Geoffrey Rush — Shine; John Brumpton — Life; Aden Young — River Street; Noah Taylor — Shine	Best Lead Actress: Judy Davis — Children of the Revolution; Gia Carides — Brilliant Lies; Claudia Karvan — Dating the Enemy; Frances O'Connor — Love & Other Catastrophes
Best Supporting Actor: Armin Mueller-Stahl — Shine; Ray Barrett — Brilliant Lies; Barry Otto — Cosi; Robert Morgan — Life	Best Supporting Actress: Toni Colette — Lilian's Story; Zoe Carides — Brilliant Lies; Annette Shun-Wah — Floating Life; Alice Garner — Love & Other Catastrophes
Best Original Screenplay: Jan Sardi — Shine; Peter Duncan — Children of the Revolution; Eddie L. C. Fong, Clara Law — Floating Life; Yael Bergman, Emma-Kate Croghan, Helen Bandis — Love & Other Catastrophes	Best Adapted Screenplay: Louis Nowra — Cosi; Nick Parsons — Dead Heart; Lawrence Johnston, John Brumpton — Life; John Scott — What I Have Written
Best Cinematography: Geoffrey Simpson — Shine; Martin McGrath — Children of the Revolution; David Parker — Mr Reliable; Dion Beebe — What I Have Written	Best Editing: Pip Karmel — Shine; Nicholas Beauman — Cosi; Bill Murphy — Life; Ken Sallows — Love & Other Catastrophes
Best Original Music Score: David Hirschfelder — Shine; Nigel Westlake — Children of the Revolution; Stephen Rae — Dead Heart; Cezary Skubiszewski — Lillian's Story	Best Sound: Toivo Lember, Roger Savage, Livia Ruzic, Gareth Vanderhope — Shine; Guntis Sics, Andrew Plain, Gethin Creagh — Children of the Revolution; Ian McLoughlin, Tim Jordan, John Penders, Phil Tipene — Dead Heart; Dean Gawen, Rex Watts, Paul Huntingford, Steven Vaughan — To Have and to Hold
Best Production Design: Roger Ford — Children of the Revolution; Steven Jones-Evans — Love Serenade; Vicki Niehus — Shine; Chris Kennedy — To Have and to Hold	Best Costume Design: Terry Ryan — Children of the Revolution; Anna Borghesi — Love Serenade; Tess Schofield — Mr Reliable; Louise Wakefield — Shine

== Television ==
Best Episode in a Television Drama Series: Frontline - Season 2, Episode 7: 'Keeping Up Appearances' (ABC) — Rob Sitch, Santo Cilauro, Jane Kennedy, Tom Gleisner; G.P. - Series 8, Episode 8: 'Ceremony Of Innocence' (ABC) — Peter Andrikidis; G.P. - Series 8, Episode 22: 'Sing Me A Lullaby' (ABC) — Peter Andrikidis; Police Rescue - Series 5, Episode 8: 'Tomorrow Never Knows' (ABC) — John Edwards, Sandra Levy	Best Miniseries or Telefeature: Blue Murder (ABC) — Rod Allan; Halifax f.p - Series 2: 'Cradle And All' (Nine Network) — Roger Simpson, Roger Le Mesurier; Naked - Episode 2: 'The Fisherman's Wake' (ABC) — Jan Chapman; State Coroner (Network Ten) — David Taft, John Kearney
Best Episode in a Television Drama Serial	Best Children's Television Drama: Spellbinder I - Episode 11: 'The Centre Of Power' (Nine Network) — Noel Price; Mirror, Mirror (Network Ten) — Andrew Blaxland, Dave Gibson; The Genie from Down Under - Series 1, Episode 1: ' (ABC) — Patricia Edgar, Phil Jones; The Silver Brumby - Episode 11: 'Fire' (Network Ten) — Colin J. South, John Tatoulis
Best Television Documentary: The Hillmen: A Soccer Fable (SBS) — Tony Wright; Demons at Drivetime (SBS) — Kerry Brewster; First Day — Patricia Edgar, Gordon Glenn; The Young One (SBS) — Emma Calver, Margie Bryant	Best Achievement in Direction in a Television Drama: Michael Jenkins — Blue Murder (ABC); Peter Andrikidis — G.P. - Series 8, Episode 22: 'Sing Me A Lullaby' (ABC); Paul Moloney — Halifax f.p. - Series 2: 'Cradle And All' (Nine Network); Tony Tilse — Police Rescue - Series 5, Episode 8: 'Tomorrow Never Knows' (ABC)
Best Performance by an Actor in a TV Drama: Richard Roxburgh — Blue Murder (ABC); Tony Martin — Blue Murder (ABC); Marton Csokas — G.P. - Series 8, Episode 8: 'Ceremony Of Innocence' (ABC); Steve Bastoni — Police Rescue - Series 5, Episode 8: 'Tomorrow Never Knows' (ABC)	Best Performance by an Actress in a TV Drama: Claudia Karvan — G.P. - Series 8, Episode 22: 'Sing Me A Lullaby' (ABC); Sonia Todd — Police Rescue - Series 5, Episode 9: 'The Only Constant' (ABC); Catherine McClements — Water Rats - Series 1, Episode 10: 'Goldstein And Son' (Nine Network)
Best Screenplay in a TV Drama: Ian David — Blue Murder (ABC); Rob Sitch, Santo Cilauro, Jane Kennedy, Tom Gleisner — Frontline - Season 2, Episode 7: 'Keeping Up Appearances' (ABC); Katherine Thomson — G.P. - Series 8, Episode 8: 'Ceremony Of Innocence' (ABC)
