= Operation Buffalo (TV series) =

Australian TV comedy-drama series

- DVD cover
- Genre: Dramedy
- Written by: Peter Duncan; Andrew Anastasios; Tanya Phegan
- Directed by: Peter Duncan
- Composer: Antony Partos
- Country of origin: Australia
- Original language: English
- No. of seasons: 1
- No. of episodes: 6

Production
- Executive producer: Peter Duncan
- Producers: Vincent Sheehan; Tanya Phegan
- Editor: Mark Perry
- Camera setup: Martin McGrath
- Running time: 60 minutes
- Production company: Porchlight Films

Original release
- Network: ABC
- Release: 31 May – 5 July 2020

Operation Buffalo (working title Fallout) is an Australian television historical fiction satirical comedy-drama series written and directed by Peter Duncan that screened on ABC TV from 31 May 2020. Its story is inspired by real events, the 1950s British nuclear tests at Maralinga, in the South Australian outback.

== Synopsis ==
The series is inspired by the true events of British nuclear bomb tests conducted in the 1950s at remote Maralinga, in outback South Australia. It specifically focuses on the four tests codenamed Operation Buffalo and follows Major Leo Carmichael as he deals with various pressures and problems during nuclear weapons testing.

== Cast ==
- Ewen Leslie as Major Leo Carmichael
- Jessica De Gouw as meteorologist Eva Lloyd-George
- James Cromwell as Commanding Officer General "Cranky" Crankford
- Tony Martin as Attorney-General Richard Wilcox
- Alan Dukes as Philip Lachlan MP
- Sam Parsonson as Hilly
- Alexander Bertrand as Murphy
- Brendan Lovett as Dr William
- Benedict Wall as Jones
- Adrienne Pickering as camp nurse Corinne Syddell
- Frances Djulibing as Ruby
- Shantae Barnes-Cowan as Peggy
- Shaka Cook as Sam
- Bojana Novakovic as Molly
- Harry Greenwood as Baxter
- Matthew Backer as Dr Myer
- Natasha Bassett as Nurse Alice
- Nicholas Hope as Dr Breston
- Lucy Velik as Yvonne
- Philip Quast as Prof Quentin Ratchett
- Julian Garner as St. John Moore
- Angus McLaren as Dalgleish
- Sean O'Shea as Dr Lewis
- Roland Powell as News Narrator
- Christina Sankari as Lydia
- Mackenzie Thomas as Emma Carmichael
- John Gaden as Swanny
- Sibylla Budd as Lorraine Carmichael
- Jack Runwald as Harry Carmichael
- Ryan Johnson as Agent Martin
- Andrew Ryan as Agent Cartwright
- Michael Denkha as Doug
- Wakarra Gondarra as Tom
- Brandon Walters as Billy
- Socrates Otto as Terry Ryan MP
- William Zappa as Sir Rupert Edgely, British High Commissioner
- Mackenzie Fearnley as Dave
- Erroll Shand as Lenny
- Heather Mitchell as Caroline Syddell
- Olga Miller as Holly
- Kevin MacIsaac as Bernie
- Dean Gould as Driver
- Luke Pegler as Nick
- Nicholas Boshier as Colone Barry
- Tiriel Mora as Hugh Blackett
- Roy Billing as Mungo
- Victoria Haralabidou as Maria
- Henry Nixon as Agent Whicker
- Michael Denkha as Doug

== Episodes ==
No.	Title	Directed by	Written by	Original release date	Australia viewers
1	"Episode 1"	Peter Duncan	Peter Duncan	31 May 2020	688,000
2	"Episode 2"	Peter Duncan	Peter Duncan	7 June 2020	595,000
3	"Episode 3"	Peter Duncan	Peter Duncan	14 June 2020	608,000
4	"Episode 4"	Peter Duncan	Peter Duncan	21 June 2020	591,000
5	"Episode 5"	Peter Duncan	Peter Duncan	28 June 2020	573,000
6	"Episode 6"	Peter Duncan	Peter Duncan	5 July 2020	593,000

== Production ==
The original working title of the series was Fallout, referring to nuclear fallout and the consequences of the British nuclear testing at Maralinga in the 1950s. The series is written as satirical comedy-drama.

The series was co-created by Peter Duncan, Vincent Sheehan, and Tanya Phegan, and written and directed by Duncan.

The six-part series was filmed in New South Wales, with additional desert location filming in South Australia.

It was produced by Sheehan and Phegan through Porchlight Films. Antony Partos composed the music, while Martin McGrath was responsible for cinematography. Mark Perry edited the series.

The French distributor and production company, APC Studios, helped fund the project and provided worldwide distribution. There was also major production investment from Screen Australia, in association with the ABC and Create NSW. Support funding was also provided by the South Australian Film Corporation.

== Broadcast ==
Operation Buffalo screened on ABC TV from 31 May 2020, as well as on ABC iview. It was deliberately screened a week after a television documentary called Maralinga Tjarutja, which showed how Aboriginal peoples in the area survived the nuclear testing, later fighting to reclaim their country.

It was sold to Acorn TV in the UK and Ireland; UPC in Switzerland; RTP in Portugal, NRK TV in Norway, Viasat World for Central and Eastern European countries, RTBF in Belgium, and Netflix for the Asia Pacific region, where it debuted on 28 February 2021.

== Critical reception ==
The series received mixed reviews. Luke Buckmaster from The Guardian gave the series three stars out of five and described the series as, "much more fickle: sometimes funny as a comedy, sometimes effective as a drama, but rarely satisfying as a combination of both". Wenlei Ma from News.com.au thought much better of the series, writing: "As much as sombre images of death and destruction can evoke emotional reactions, nothing hits the point as hard as the glaring judgment of satire done well, which is exactly what Operation Buffalo is".

Anthony Morris, writing for ScreenHub Australia, gave it 3.5 out of 5 stars, saying that the series is "entertaining but takes a while to find its feet". Craig Mathieson wrote in The Sydney Morning Herald that the series succeeds in reflecting the official mood of the time, but "The tonal shifts begin at the awkward, but soon reach the baffling", as the bad things that really happened, including the displacement of Aboriginal people, are confused with "screwball" comedy. However he praises the pace.

Pierra Willix wrote in PerthNow that the series provided "an important insight into the devastation we unleashed on Aboriginals(sic) centuries after colonisation", and "While the new drama series is a compelling and entertaining watch, we can't forget that at the centre of the story were a group of people whose lands and lives were collateral damage in testing that was being developed to also destroy the lives of others", referring to the people of Maralinga Tjarutja.
