= Rake (Australian TV series) =

Australian television series (2010–2018)

- Genre: Comedy drama
- Created by: Peter Duncan; Richard Roxburgh; Charles Waterstreet
- Written by: Peter Duncan; Andrew Knight
- Starring: Richard Roxburgh; Adrienne Pickering; Matt Day; Russell Dykstra; Danielle Cormack; Caroline Brazier; Keegan Joyce; Kate Box; Damien Garvey
- Theme music composer: Johann Strauss II / David McCormack
- Opening theme: The Blue Danube
- Composers: Michael Lira; David McCormack; Antony Partos
- Country of origin: Australia
- Original language: English
- No. of series: 5
- No. of episodes: 40

Production
- Executive producer: Miranda Dear
- Producers: Peter Duncan; Richard Roxburgh; Ian Collie
- Production locations: Sydney, New South Wales, Australia
- Cinematography: Martin McGrath
- Running time: 60 minutes
- Production companies: Blow by Blow Productions; Essential Media and Entertainment (seasons 1–4); Easy Tiger Productions (season 5)

Original release
- Network: ABC TV
- Release: 4 November 2010 – 7 October 2018

Related
- Rake (US version)

Rake is an Australian television series produced by Essential Media and Entertainment for ABC TV. It stars Richard Roxburgh as the rakish Cleaver Greene, a brilliant but self-destructive Sydney barrister, defending a usually guilty client. The series aired for five seasons from 4 November 2010 to 7 October 2018.

== Cast ==
=== Main cast ===
- Richard Roxburgh as Cleaver Greene, a brilliant but self-destructive criminal defence barrister. The character is loosely based on colourful Sydney barristers Mervyn Ward and Charles Waterstreet, and was named after Cleaver Bunton. At the end of the fourth series, he is elected to a seat as an independent senator. At the end of the fifth series, he is appointed Chief Justice of the High Court of Australia.
- Russell Dykstra as Barney "Barnyard" Meagher, one of Cleaver's instructing solicitors and his best friend. After Cleaver sleeps with his wife Scarlet, Barney feels betrayed and his relationships with both Cleaver and Scarlet are disrupted. In the second series, Barney begins an affair with Cleaver's secretary, Nicole. At the start of the third series, it is revealed that Barney and Nicole are having a child together, and that Barney is receiving treatment for testicular cancer.
- Danielle Cormack as Scarlet "Red" Engles SC, Barney's wife, a criminal prosecutions barrister. In the second series, she works part-time for Cal McGregor, the Attorney General, before returning to the bar as a criminal defence barrister in the third series. In addition to this, during the third series she has a short-lived affair with David Potter, another barrister with political ambitions, who is prosecuting Cleaver for non-payment of taxes. Scarlet succeeds in being promoted to Senior Counsel.
- Matt Day as David "Harry-Sorry, David" Potter, a tax lawyer prosecuting Cleaver Greene and attempting to get into politics with the help of Attorney General Joe Sandilands. In series 2, Potter is a member of the Parliament of New South Wales and of the Australian Labor Party and is Shadow Attorney General. In the third series, he has become the Leader of the NSW Australian Labor Party, and is having a secret affair with Scarlet. In the fourth series, he runs as a Senator for the Australian Greens. David is nicknamed "Harry-Sorry, David" as a joke on his surname and the fact that he wears Harry Potter-styled glasses.
- Adrienne Pickering as Melissa "Missy" Partridge, a former prostitute turned law student, caught between being Potter's girlfriend and helping Greene, a former client for whom she has developed feelings. By the end of the first series, she reveals her true identity as Jane Tanner (Turner) to Cleaver and David, and leave to travel around Europe. In series 2, she has written a book based on her life in prostitution under the name of "J.M. Doolan". In series 3, the book based on her life is made into a film. In series 4, she returns to Australia after a hiatus in America; she is addicted to a multitude of drugs and has to go through the process of removing the addiction of ice. In the end of series 4 she is pregnant with Finnegan Greene's child.
- Caroline Brazier as Wendy Greene, Cleaver's ex-wife, who is a psychologist in a hospital psychiatric ward. At the end of the second series, she starts dating Roger, an osteopath, and at the beginning of the third series she and Roger are engaged.
- Keegan Joyce as Finnegan "Fuzz" Greene, Cleaver and Wendy's teenage son, who often has sexual relationships with older women. By the end of the second series, he has started dating Tara, an evangelical Christian, and during the third series is planning on doing aid work in the Congo.
- Kate Box as Nicole Vargas, Cleaver's long-suffering secretary, who has a drunken one-night stand with Barney, days before her marriage. In the third series, she and Barney have a child out of wedlock.
- Damien Garvey as Cal McGregor, the successor of Joe Sandilands as Attorney General of New South Wales. He is corrupt and is sent to jail. He hates Cleaver because of an affair Cleaver had with Cal's ex-wife and former NSW Premier, Claudia McGregor, played by Toni Collette. Cal is released on parole at the start of the third series, and becomes a current affairs journalist and popular bombastic TV pundit.
- Geoff Morrell as Joe Sandilands, Labor Party Attorney General of New South Wales. After reports of himself being a regular customer of the brothel in which Missy worked, he commits suicide, and is replaced by corrupt Liberal politician Cal McGregor.
- Robyn Malcolm plays Kirsty Corella, wife of imprisoned crime boss Mick Corella, whom Cleaver defended. Cleaver owes huge gambling debts to Mick and then to Kirsty, who takes over as boss while Mick is in prison. During the second series, she briefly dates Cleaver, before falling in love with Col, her "enforcer," who frequently pays Cleaver visits to "persuade" him to pay his gambling debts.
- Steve Le Marquand as Col Mancusi, Mick and Kirsty's henchman. He is in love with Kirsty and eventually enters a relationship with her, thanks to Cleaver's encouragement.
- Rhys Muldoon as Lincoln Lincoln, an incompetent solicitor who occasionally instructs on matters for Cleaver and Scarlet.

=== Guest cast ===
Episode	Actor, role
1.1	Hugo Weaving as Professor Graham Murray; Sacha Horler as Murray's wife
1.2	Lisa McCune as Lucy Marx; Ryan Johnson as Marty
1.3	Lech Mackiewicz as George Dana; Roy Billing as Judge Jordan
1.4	David Field as Denny Lorton; Noah Taylor as Stanley Shrimpton
1.5	Heather Mitchell as Jan Chandler; Sam Neill as Dr Bruce Chandler
1.6	Rachel Griffiths as Eddie Langhorn; Jonathan Biggins as Martin; Barry Crocker as Errol Greene, Cleaver's father
1.7	Victoria Thaine as Fiona McReady
1.8	Damon Herriman as Detective Maraco; Richard Carter as Mick Corella; Robyn Malcolm as Kirsty Corella; Paul Gleeson as Nigel; Steve Le Marquand as Col
2.1	Toni Collette as Premier Claudia Marshall
2.2	Don Hany as Damien Tengrove; Garry McDonald as Lawrence Fenton; Jacinta John as Agatha; Jack Thompson as Justice Beesdon
2.3	Marshall Napier as Prosecution
2.4	Angie Milliken as Therese Faulkner; Martin Henderson as Joshua Floyd; Rhys Muldoon as Lincoln Lincoln; Ben Oxenbould as Alistair Emery
2.5	Mary Coustas as Judge Ben; Chris Haywood as Prosecution
2.6	Jacqueline McKenzie as Alannah Alford; Martin Sacks as Roger Evans; Stephen Curry as Alex Alford
2.7	Bille Brown as Dominic; Sonia Todd as Jane
2.8	Maeve Dermody as Polly Nesbitt
3.1	Dan Wyllie as Malcolm Finnane; Bruce Spence as George Corella; Emil Wolk as Justice Kieran Webster
3.2	John Noble as Clayton Post; Genevieve Lemon as Tikki Wendon; Simon Westaway as Gordon Martin; Marta Kaczmarek as Maria Vargas; Gary Waddell as Harley
3.3	Jane Allsop as Felicity Finnane; Aden Young as Joshua (in film); Elizabeth Debicki as Missy (in film); Cate Blanchett as Cleaver (in film); Magda Szubanski as Helen; Jerome Ehlers as Maitre d'
3.4	Lex Marinos as Spiro; Ben Lawson as Craig; John Flaus as Vernon
3.5	Paul Sonkkila as Father Bobby
3.7	Sibylla Budd as Ms. Guilfoyle QC
3.8	Josh Quong Tart as Detective Sando
4.1	John Waters as Edgar Thompson; Rachael Blake as Ruth Rogers; Sara Wiseman as Caitlin
4.2	Justine Clarke as Alli Franklin; Ryan Johnson as Raymond; Kate Fitzpatrick as Judith
4.3	Miriam Margolyes as Huntley-Brown QC; Ryan Johnson as Raymond
4.5	Kym Gyngell as Reggie; Ewen Leslie as Bevan Leigh; Harriet Dyer as Star Mannix; Alex Cubis as Kyle Mannix; Huw Higginson as Malcolm Hammill; Nick Tate as Julian Tallow
4.6	Tasma Walton as Jack; Michael Denkha as Roy
4.7	Barry Otto as Judge Cowper; Lewis Fitz-Gerald as Mandel
5.1	Jacek Koman as Jakub; Helen Thomson as PM Angela Way; Tony Briggs as Greg Peters; Mark Mitchinson as Joe McGregor; William McInnes as Gareth Morrow; Jane Turner as Penny Evans; Anthony LaPaglia as Linus; Jim Daly as Frank O'Brien; Wayne Pigram as PM Ryland Webster
5.4	Tasneem Roc as Li-Ming Wu; Greg Eccleston as Suited Man

== Episodes ==
Series	Episodes	Originally released	
Series	Episodes	First released	Last released
1	8	4 November 2010	23 December 2010
2	8	6 September 2012	25 October 2012
3	8	9 February 2014	30 March 2014
4	8	19 May 2016	7 July 2016
5	8	19 August 2018	7 October 2018

=== Season 1 (2010) ===
No. overall	No. in series	Title	Directed by	Written by	Original release date
1	1	"R v Murray"	Peter Duncan	Peter Duncan	4 November 2010
Cleaver Greene defends Professor Murray (Hugo Weaving), an economist, against the charge of murder after Murray is found to be a cannibal.
2	2	"R v Marx"	Peter Duncan	Peter Duncan	11 November 2010
Cleaver Greene attempts to badly defend Lucy Marx (Lisa McCune), the mother of a convicted murderer, so that she may go to prison for jury tampering after her daughter is found guilty of murder, but things go wrong when he finds that she actually is guilty.
3	3	"R v Dana"	Rachel Ward	Andrew Knight	18 November 2010
Cleaver Greene defends George Dana (Lech Mackiewicz), a chef, on charges of bigamy after he is found out to have been married to two women at the same time.
4	4	"R v Lorton"	Rachel Ward	Andrew Knight	25 November 2010
Cleaver Greene defends Denny Lorton (David Field), a homeless vagrant and gifted artist, against a charge of murder of a 15-year-old boy in a lane, only to later find that he was actually guilty of murder for the sake of art.
5	5	"R v Chandler"	Jeffrey Walker	Peter Duncan	2 December 2010
Dr. Chandler (Sam Neill) is accused of having sex with the family dog and Cleaver Greene defends him.
6	6	"R v Langhorn"	Jeffrey Walker	Andrew Knight	9 December 2010
Cleaver Greene defends Eddie Langhorn (Rachel Griffiths) for inciting a race riot on her afternoon radio program.
7	7	"R v Tanner"	Jessica Hobbs	Peter Duncan	16 December 2010
Cleaver is given the case of Travis Tanner (Hugo Johnstone-Burt), a young man accused of bashing and robbing an Asian woman referred to as "Glebe woman”.
8	8	"R v Corella"	Jessica Hobbs	Andrew Knight	23 December 2010
Cleaver Greene defends Mick Corella ( Richard Carter), his illegal bookmaker who he has extensive debts to from his gambling addiction. On the charge of murder, of man named Nigel who was getting involved with his wife Kirsty after he hosted a swingers social party. Mick concocts a story that Nigel fell on his own knife and was a dangerous man after DNA evidence shows a body found under concrete at his construction site is Nigel's.

=== Season 2 (2012) ===
No. overall	No. in series	Title	Directed by	Written by	Original release date
9	1	"R v Mohammed"	Peter Duncan	Peter Duncan	6 September 2012
Cleaver Greene defends the wife of a newly-converted Muslim man who blew himself up outside the New South Wales Parliament House, mistaking it for the Federal Parliament, in an attempt to kill the Prime Minister. However, he was the only one killed. The wife is charged with conspiracy to commit acts of terrorism. Meanwhile, Cleaver is caught on camera having an affair with the Premier of New South Wales (Toni Collette), causing her husband, the Attorney General (Damien Garvey), to do everything in his power to destroy the hapless barrister. Meanwhile, Cleaver's nemesis David Potter has been left in a broken Opposition left with many ministerial positions; the major one being Shadow Attorney General.
10	2	"R v Fenton"	Peter Duncan	Andrew Knight	13 September 2012
An ex-English teacher (Garry McDonald), fed up with the lack of communication skills in a modern digital world, manages to sneak into a major political meeting between the British Secret Service and their Australian counterparts. In order to make an example of him, Attorney General Cal McGregor manages to convince his Federal contacts to try Fenton under the anti-terrorism legislation by a very biased Federal judge. Meanwhile, Cleaver is still considered a persona non grata by Barney after getting in a fight with a drunk clown at a children's birthday party organised by Scarlet. Meanwhile, David Potter launches a defamation suit against Cleaver.
11	3	"R v Wooldridge & Anor"	Rowan Woods	Peter Duncan	20 September 2012
Missy's novel based on her life as a prostitute has caused a sensation. At her book signing she reveals to David that she's now engaged to the infamous founder of an on-line leaks site. Meanwhile, Cleaver's roving eye has led him to stray again, this time with Michelle (Lily Sullivan), who tells him she's making a short film for Tropfest. He discovers she's not yet 16, and is horrified, but it's too late. Michelle is soon charged with accidentally killing a fellow actor while filming a scene, and blackmails Cleaver into defending her.
12	4	"R v Floyd"	Rowan Woods	Andrew Knight	27 September 2012
Missy and Joshua are Australia's most newsworthy couple: she is a bestselling author, and he is facing treason charges. Meanwhile, Cleaver, having been ditched by Barney, is lamenting the lack of briefs coming his way, especially when Nicole is constantly reminding him about the cases Barney used to bring in. Cleaver tries to help his son Fuzz, who is still in anguish over his latest failed romantic endeavour, and they both end up in the confessional. But for Cleaver, there's no relief. He's under pressure to meet the emotional and physical needs of his sugar mummy, Kirsty (Robyn Malcolm), and he's being cleverly outplayed in his defamation case. But then Joshua shocks Cleaver and the Sydney bar by inviting Cleaver to represent him in the case of the decade. Cleaver now has a lucrative brief, secures his own chambers, and is mentioned in America Today as "leading Australian civil rights lawyer". Barney's back on board and things seem poised to go right – moments before something goes terribly, terribly wrong...
13	5	"R v Turner"	Jeffrey Walker	Peter Duncan	4 October 2012
Missy is on trial for murdering her fiancé, but Cleaver plans to expose the conspiracy to murder Joshua by the security set-up he humiliated. Assisted by a mysterious smoking man, he follows the trail to ASIO, the CIA, and information that may bring down the international banking system and several governments. But he needs to find the evidence. Kirsty is furious that Cleaver is spending so much time with Missy, but when standover man Col threatens to express that disapproval in the usual manner, Cleaver recognises that Col has a secret. Delirious with a broken arm, Barney confesses to Scarlet that he's met someone else. Hurt and confused, Scarlet allows an innocent lunch with Harry to progress down a primrose path that, with some help from Cal McGregor, will lead to perdition. Cal asks Scarlet to provide an alibi for his skipped meeting with the Premier. She does, believing it will also cover her indiscretion with David, but Cal has a darker purpose. Some of Joshua's personal secrets are revealed in court and Missy is horrified, not only by his betrayal, but that there is now a motive for murder. Can Cleaver maintain professional standards long enough to get Missy off?
14	6	"R v Alford"	Jeffrey Walker	Andrew Knight	11 October 2012
When a piercing scream splits the dawn silence of a leafy, suburban arcadia Cleaver and Barney are soon defending an IT lecturer accused of severing his neighbour's penis with garden shears. Cleaver and Barney wade into the unfamiliar swamp of Rotarians, golf and backyard barbecues to uncover the truth behind the 'bobbitting'. Barney and Nicole have failed in their attempts to end their affair, despite Nicole's approaching wedding. And even incurious Cleaver works out that the emotional rollercoasters of both Nicole and Barney are moving in sync. Only one thing could worsen their situation... Cleaver deciding to help. Wendy is falling for Roger, the husband of Fuzz's ex-lover, while Fuzz has a surprise new girlfriend. When Cleaver attempts to cure Missy's depression at a dinner with his family, he ends up being everyone's target. Scarlet and David are firmly on Cal McGregor's hook, but David's colleagues push him to sacrifice Scarlet to save himself. Poised between political oblivion and the dangled promise of the Opposition leadership, David, typically, prevaricates. Cal will happily fire a bullet at Scarlet in the hope it also takes out David, even better if he can wing Cleaver too. Scarlet realises there is only one lawyer devious and unethical enough to get her out from under the 'sword of Damocles'.
15	7	"Greene v Hole"	Kate Dennis	Andrew Knight	18 October 2012
Scarlett and David's affair is front page news, and Scarlet faces the disapproval of the private school mothers. Barney and Nicole agree to be 'just friends' but their definitions of friendship differ somewhat. While drunk, Greene visits a gangster friend who owes him a favour, saying he wants Lane Hole (Phil Lloyd) 'sorted out' for swindling his father out of his portfolio of shares. An assassin is hired and kills a neighbour of Hole's by mistake. Greene sobers up too late.
16	8	"R v Greene"	Kate Dennis	Peter Duncan	25 October 2012
Cleaver is in prison, charged with the manslaughter of Lane Hole's sweet, elderly neighbour. He is bailed out by Missy, flush with funds since optioning the rights to her story to Hollywood. Greene attempts to get his charge changed to murder of the neighbour, a charge he is sure he can beat but only succeeds in getting it changed to conspiracy to murder Lane Hole. In a number of court appearances, despite the judge being against him, Greene manages to get the Attorney General for abusing his office to attack Greene, and others charged over deliberately lying in court, all sent to jail. But the bungling assassin plea bargains, implicating Greene, and is sentenced to prison. Greene is sentenced to 14 years, of which he must serve at least 8. In a prison cell, he philosophically accepts his lot but the Attorney General and two others he has just had sent to the same prison turn up outside his cell, wanting revenge, and one of them has the cell key. End.

=== Season 3 (2014) ===
No. overall	No. in series	Title	Directed by	Written by	Original release date
17	1	"Episode 1"	Jessica Hobbs	Peter Duncan	9 February 2014
Cleaver Greene finds himself languishing in prison, after having served 11 months of his 14 year sentence. Inside he befriends Mal (Dan Wyllie), who has served 17 years for the murder of his abusive father. Inside, he faces up to George Corella (Bruce Spence), the prison boss who is serving 160 years for quadruple murder. While Scarlet prepares his appeal, a corrupt judge gives Cleaver inside information on one of the appeal judges that might sway the appeal in Cleaver's favour. Meanwhile, Col plots to get on George's good side, being the partner of George's ex-fiancee Kirsty.
18	2	"Episode 2"	Jessica Hobbs	Andrew Knight	16 February 2014
Cleaver manages to outsmart the appeal judges with his inside knowledge of a shady business deal. However, his world has fallen apart: Barney is suffering from cancer, Scarlet has taken up his practice, Nicole is living in Cleaver's flat while bringing up her and Barney's love child. Scarlet and David Potter are having an affair, Wendy and Roger are selling the house and getting married, while Fuzz is abandoning university to do aid work in the Congo. Meanwhile, having been released, Mal auditions for Aussie's Gotta Sing, with tragic consequences.
19	3	"Episode 3"	Jonathan Teplitzky	Peter Duncan	23 February 2014
The film based on the life of Joshua and Missy is released, with a surprising casting choice for Cleaver. Scarlett is appointed as a Senior Counsel, and at the celebration party, with his casino winnings, Cleaver invests into a restaurant. Cleaver also acts as Scarlett's junior counsel for Helen, a doctor's receptionist charged with defrauding Medicare of $400,000 by making her child pretend he has cancer. In the background, Tikki is still pushing for her casino to be built, and both David and (inadvertently) Cleaver make it hard for her.
20	4	"Episode 4"	Jonathan Teplitzky	Andrew Knight	2 March 2014
A murder brings Felicity back into Cleaver's life. He knows he needs Barney, despite everything that's happening in Barney's life; and he can't say goodbye to Wendy or Missy.
21	5	"Episode 5"	Rowan Woods	Andrew Knight	9 March 2014
Cleaver is retained for a low-rent tawdry sex offence, but the Royal Commissions that have decimated David's front bench mean that even barrel-bottom Cleaver Greene is getting many briefs.
22	6	"Episode 6"	Rowan Woods	Peter Duncan	16 March 2014
Cleaver's attempts at wooing result in his being a person of interest in multiple incidents of suspected domestic abuse. Fuzz has returned with his lover, the wife of the Congolese foreign minister, a Cleaveresque attitude, and, according to the AFP, a large quantity of blood diamonds.
23	7	"Episode 7"	Kate Dennis	Andrew Knight	23 March 2014
Siege veteran Cleaver leads Wendy, Fuzz and Prue out of Roger's hostage crisis, but is accidentally shot in the buttock.
24	8	"Episode 8"	Kate Dennis	Peter Duncan	30 March 2014
Something is seriously awry in Cleaver's world. His practice is booming, Barney is thriving and he is falling in love with Felicity. But does fate have some nasty surprises in store?

=== Season 4 (2016) ===
No. overall	No. in series	Title	Directed by	Written by	Original release date
25	1	"Episode 1"	Peter Salmon	Andrew Knight	19 May 2016
Last seen dangling from a balloon drifting across Sydney, Cleaver Greene crashes back to earth – literally and metaphorically, through a harbourside window into the unwelcoming embrace of chaos past.
26	2	"Episode 2"	Peter Salmon	Peter Duncan	26 May 2016
Cleaver's been hiding out in the country posing as a writer, but his cover's blown when Barney appears on Australian Story, complete with images of his best friend. It isn't long before Thompson's goons arrive on the scene.
27	3	"Episode 3"	Rowan Woods	Andrew Knight, Peter Duncan	2 June 2016
Wendy reluctantly takes Cleaver in after he's evicted, while Barney is reeling from the costs of his rescue. David and Scarlet's romance is slowly being scuttled by her children; and Missy is desperate for drugs.
28	4	"Episode 4"	Rowan Woods	Peter Duncan	9 June 2016
Thompson has Cleaver in the frame for drug trafficking, but Wendy comes to the rescue. David is desperate to save his relationship with Scarlet, and Nicole is scrolling through her former fiance's posts.
29	5	"Episode 5"	Rowan Woods	Andrew Knight	16 June 2016
Barney & Cleaver are back on speaking terms and share a case; David is charged with Scarlet's death; Cleaver rescues Missy who's been enjoying a cocaine-hazed few days with Cal McGregor, and appeals to Wendy's better nature to take her in
30	6	"Episode 6"	Rowan Woods	Peter Duncan	23 June 2016
Cleaver defends David but Barney sees it as a betrayal; Fuzz gets Missy drugs and then she seduces him. Wendy has a date with an old flame; and a free David announces he's standing for the Senate.
31	7	"Episode 7"	Peter Duncan	Andrew Knight	30 June 2016
After David's acquittal Cleaver and Nicole worry about Barney, but then Cleaver gets himself disbarred and Wendy kicks him out. But Jack is determined to get him out of Wendy's life forever.
32	8	"Episode 8"	Peter Duncan	Peter Duncan	7 July 2016
Cleaver considers a career change but David throws a spanner in the works. Cleaver's determined to win Wendy back from Jack, but Jack is scheming to get rid of him for good. Will it work? Fuzz has some surprising news.

=== Season 5 (2018) ===
No. overall	No. in series	Title	Directed by	Written by	Original release date
33	1	"Greene v The World"	Rowan Woods	Peter Duncan	19 August 2018
After taking up residency in Canberra as a senator in Federal Parliament, Cleaver has old foes and new. A terrorist gas attack on New Parliament House causes the seat of government to move down the hill to its old home.
34	2	"Greene v The United States"	Rowan Woods	Andrew Knight	26 August 2018
Incriminating multimedia and a missing US Defense Secretary puts Cleaver firmly in the sights of the Secret Service as it comes to light that the suspected terrorist attack may have been caused by something much more benign.
35	3	"Evans v Greene"	Jennifer Leacey	Peter Duncan	2 September 2018
After mislaying his suit at a fancy-dress party Cleaver is not only forced to do the walk of shame, but to speak to the house.... dressed as a zebra; and he becomes the prime suspect in an assassination attempt.
36	4	"Gold and Greene v Red"	Jennifer Leacey	Peter Duncan	9 September 2018
A new PM is sworn in on the eve of Anzac Day, and Cleaver is served with a summons in the defamation case Evans v Greene ahead of a heated debate over the sell-off of the Aussie ice cream icon – the Oz Ripple.
37	5	"Greene v Diaries"	Shannon MUrphy	Andrew Knight	16 September 2018
It's a new week and a new Prime Minister. Indigenous Liberal Greg Peters has come to the fore to lead the country with his own agenda; just as there's panic in the Capital as ministerial diaries are to be published.
38	6	"Greene v The Unflushables"	Shannon Murphy	Peter Duncan	23 September 2018
After a 21-week term Peters is out as PM and Morrow is in; Cleaver's own plumbing issues shed light on the true cause of the explosion at Parliament House; and an intended hit gone wrong results in a Senate resignation.
39	7	"Greene v Mid-Winter"	Matthew Saville	Andrew Knight	30 September 2018
War is looming in the South China Sea; a cabinet reshuffle is on the cards, and the plumbers handled! The move back to New Parliament House is on, but not before the Mid-Winter Ball; and a feud is buried for political gain.
40	8	"Greene v The Reckoning"	Matthew Saville	Peter Duncan	7 October 2018
Morrow has been toppled; aided and abetted by his half-brother Joe, Cal McGregor is now PM. Following an international incident and a monumental cover up, will the capitol implode while our heroes chose to explode? Greene becomes Chief Justice of the High Court of Australia.

== Production ==
The series was created by Peter Duncan, Richard Roxburgh, and Charles Waterstreet, and written by Peter Duncan and Andrew Knight. Cinematography was by Martin McGrath, and the series was executive produced by Miranda Dear.

== Ratings ==
=== Season 1 (2010) ===
No.	Title	Air date	Overnight ratings		Ref(s)
No.	Title	Air date	Viewers	Rank	Ref(s)
1	Episode 1	4 November 2010	900,000	10	
2	Episode 2	11 November 2010	666,000	21	
3	Episode 3	18 November 2010	741,000	14	
4	Episode 4	25 November 2010	701,000	16	
5	Episode 5	2 December 2010	759,000	10	
6	Episode 6	9 December 2010	707,000	14	
7	Episode 7	16 December 2010	648,000	13	
8	Episode 8	23 December 2010	673,000	11	

=== Season 2 (2012) ===
No.	Title	Air date	Overnight ratings		Ref(s)
No.	Title	Air date	Viewers	Rank	Ref(s)
1	Episode 1	6 September 2012	798,000	10	
2	Episode 2	13 September 2012	821,000	10	
3	Episode 3	20 September 2012	780,000	10	
4	Episode 4	27 September 2012	764,000	12	
5	Episode 5	4 October 2012	794,000	10	
6	Episode 6	11 October 2012	802,000	11	
7	Episode 7	18 October 2012	807,000	8	
8	Episode 8	25 October 2012	850,000	7	

=== Season 3 (2014) ===
No.	Title	Air date	Overnight ratings		Consolidated ratings		Total viewers	Ref(s)
No.	Title	Air date	Viewers	Rank	Viewers	Rank	Total viewers	Ref(s)
1	Episode 1	9 February 2014	645,000	13	135,000	12	780,000	
2	Episode 2	16 February 2014	739,000	9	124,000	8	863,000	
3	Episode 3	23 February 2014	617,000	12	179,000	11	796,000	
4	Episode 4	2 March 2014	638,000	13	155,000	9	793,000	
5	Episode 5	9 March 2014	561,000	10	153,000	10	714,000	
6	Episode 6	16 March 2014	690,000	12	154,000	11	844,000	
7	Episode 7	23 March 2014	627,000	10	162,000	10	789,000	
8	Episode 8	30 March 2014	759,000	10	133,000	9	892,000	

=== Season 4 (2016) ===
No.	Title	Air date	Overnight ratings		Consolidated ratings		Total viewers	Ref(s)
No.	Title	Air date	Viewers	Rank	Viewers	Rank	Total viewers	Ref(s)
1	Episode 1	19 May 2016	653,000	10	79,000	10	732,000	
2	Episode 2	26 May 2016	626,000	15	84,000	10	710,000	
3	Episode 3	2 June 2016	602,000	14	155,000	8	757,000	
4	Episode 4	9 June 2016	601,000	13	98,000	9	699,000	
5	Episode 5	16 June 2016	605,000	13	124,000	9	729,000	
6	Episode 6	23 June 2016	570,000	14	106,000	10	676,000	
7	Episode 7	30 June 2016	560,000	13	144,000	10	704,000	
8	Episode 8	7 July 2016	559,000	15	103,000	10	662,000	

=== Season 5 (2018) ===
No.	Title	Air date	Overnight ratings		Consolidated ratings		Total viewers	Ref(s)
No.	Title	Air date	Viewers	Rank	Viewers	Rank	Total viewers	Ref(s)
1	Episode 1	19 August 2018	715,000	5	128,000	5	844,000	
2	Episode 2	26 August 2018	573,000	7	141,000	7	714,000	
3	Episode 3	2 September 2018	522,000	9	—N/a	—N/a	—N/a	

== Awards and nominations ==
Year	Award	Category	Nominee	Result	Ref.
2011	Equity Awards	Most Outstanding Performance by an Ensemble in a Drama Series	Cast	Won	
2011	AWGIE Awards	Television – Series	Series 1, episode 5 'R v. Chandler' – Peter Duncan	Won	
2011	ASSG Awards	Best Achievement in Sound for a Tele-Feature or Short Run Series	Series 1 – Chris Alderton, Todd Kirkness, Sue Kerr, Peter Hall, Trevor Harrison, Olivia Monteith, Ian Donato, Natalie Choo and Michol Marsh	Nominated	
2012	AACTA Awards	Best Television Drama Series	Rake	Nominated	
2013	AACTA Awards	Best Television Drama Series	Season 2 – Ian Collie, Peter Duncan and Richard Roxburgh	Nominated	
2013	AACTA Awards	Best Lead Actor in a Television Drama	Richard Roxburgh	Won	
2013	Australian Screen Music Awards	Best Music for a Television Series or Serial	Season 2, episode 8 'Greene' – Michael Lira, David McCormack and Antony Partos	Nominated	
2013	AWGIE Awards	Television – Series	Series 2: "R v. Floyd" – Andrew Knight	Won	
2014	AWGIE Awards	Television – Series	Series 3 "Their Lordships v. Finnane" – Peter Duncan	Won	
2014	Australian Directors Guild Awards	Best Direction in a TV Drama Series	Series 2, episode 2 – Peter Duncan	Nominated	
2014	Australian Screen Music Awards	Best Music for a Television Series or Serial	Series 3, episode 1 – David McCormack, Antony Partos and Michael Lira	Nominated	
2014	ASSG Awards	Best Sound for a Television Drama Series	Series 3 – Guntis Sics, Gerry Nucifora, Aron Dyer, Peter Hall, Leon Horrocks, Evan Horton and Michol Marsh	Nominated	
2015	AACTA Awards	Best Television Drama Series	Season 3 – Ian Collie, Peter Duncan and Richard Roxburgh	Nominated	
2015	AACTA Awards	Best Screenplay in Television	Series 3, episode 1 – Peter Duncan	Nominated	
2015	AACTA Awards	Best Lead Actor in a Television Drama	Richard Roxburgh	Nominated	
2015	AACTA Awards	Best Guest or Supporting Actor in a Television Drama	Dan Wyllie	Nominated	
2015	AACTA Awards	Best Editing in Television	Series 3, episode 1 – Henry Dangar ASE	Nominated	
2015	Logie Awards	Most Outstanding Drama Series	Rake	Nominated	
2015	Logie Awards	Most Outstanding Actor	Richard Roxburgh	Nominated	
2015	Australian Directors Guild Awards	Best Direction in a TV Drama Series	Series 3, episode 1 – Jessica Hobbs	Nominated	
2015	Australian Directors Guild Awards	Best Direction in a TV Drama Series	Series 3, episode 5 – Rowan Woods	Nominated	
2017	Logie Awards	Most Outstanding Drama Series	Rake	Nominated	
2017	Logie Awards	Most Outstanding Actor	Richard Roxburgh	Nominated	
2017	Logie Awards	Logie Award for Best Actor	Richard Roxburgh	Nominated	

== American remake ==
The Fox Network in the US commissioned an American version, starring Greg Kinnear as the lead character, renamed Keegan Deane for American audiences. It aired between January and April 2014. Richard Roxburgh was a producer on the American version alongside Kinnear.

== Soundtrack ==
Original music for the show was composed and performed by David McCormack (of Custard), Antony Partos and Michael Lira, at Sonar Music in Sydney. A soundtrack album Rake: Music from the TV Series was released through ABC Music in July 2016.
