= Valentine's Day (2008 film) =

2007 Australian comedy TV film

- Screenplay by: Peter Temple
- Directed by: Peter Duncan
- Starring: Rhys Muldoon
- Country of origin: Australia
- Original language: English

Production
- Producer: Tony Wright

Original release
- Release: 6 July 2008

Valentine's Day is an Australian comedy film made in 2007 by the Australian Broadcasting Corporation with support of Film Victoria. Directed by Martin McGrath, it was first shown on TV on 6 July 2008. The main character, Ben Valentine (played by Rhys Muldoon), visits the small Victorian country town of Rushworth and is mistaken for a champion footballer of the same name. The canny local magistrate sentences him to 200 hours of community service, to be served coaching the town's team, the Bears.

== Film Genre ==
This film is produced in Australia and it falls under the genre of comedy and drama. As according to Sydney Morning Herald.

== Cast ==
- Rhys Muldoon as Ben Valentine
- Adam Zwar as Beak
- Marley Sharp as Luke Kennedy
- Roy Billing as Kevin Flynn
- Louise Siversen as Dawn
- Andrew Blackman as Tony Cosgrove
- Terry Norris as Stump Woods
- Victoria Eagger as Barmaid
