= Passion (1999 film) =

- Directed by: Peter Duncan
- Written by: John Bird; Rob George; George Goldsworthy; Peter Goldsworthy; Don Watson
- Produced by: Matt Carroll; Gary Hamilton; Nym Kim; Zanna Northam; Adrienne Read; Sandra Schulberg
- Starring: Richard Roxburgh; Barbara Hershey; Emily Woof; Claudia Karvan; Simon Burke; Julia Blake; Bille Brown; Roy Billing
- Release date: 1 July 1999
- Running time: 102 minutes
- Country: Australia
- Language: English
- Box office: A$302,818 (Australia)

Passion, known in some releases as Passion: The Story of Percy Grainger, is a 1999 Australian drama film about some episodes in the life of the pianist and composer Percy Grainger. It stars Richard Roxburgh as Grainger.

== Plot ==
Passion concentrates on Grainger's unusual relationship with his mother and his sexual interests (especially his obsessive self-flagellation, though homosexuality is also hinted at), which affect his relationship with a woman who comes to love him.

It is set mainly in London in 1914, when Grainger's mother Rose was ill (she later jumped to her death in New York, following ill-founded rumours of incest with her son).

== Cast ==
- Richard Roxburgh as Percy Grainger
- Barbara Hershey as Rose Grainger
- Bille Brown as John Grainger
- Emily Woof as Karen Holten
- Claudia Karvan as Alfhild de Luce
- Simon Burke as Hermann Sandby
- Linda Cropper as Lilith Lowery
- Julia Blake as Queen Alexandra
- Roy Billing as John Perring Jr
- Genevieve Mooy as Ada Crossley
- Peter Whitford as Tour Manager
- Ian Bliss as Army Officer

== Production ==
The film was shot on location in Bath, Somerset and Devon in England, and Sydney, Canberra and Michelago in Australia.

== Awards and nominations ==
Passion won the 1999 Award of Distinction from the Australian Cinematographers Society for Martin McGrath's cinematography.

McGrath also won the Best Achievement in Cinematography award at the 1999 Australian Film Institute Awards. AFI Awards also went to Terry Ryan for Best Achievement in Costume Design, and Murray Picknett for Best Achievement in Production Design.

AFI nominations went to Richard Roxburgh for Best Performance by an Actor in a Leading Role, Claudia Karvan and Emily Woof for Best Performance by an Actress in a Supporting Role, and Andrew Plain, Phil Judd, Guntis Sics, Anne Breslin, Jane Paterson for Best Achievement in Sound.

Claudia Karvan was nominated for the 2000 Film Critics Circle of Australia Awards for Best Supporting Actor – Female.

Director Peter Duncan was nominated for the Golden St. George at the 21st Moscow International Film Festival.

== See also ==
- Cinema of Australia
