= Adrienne Pickering =

Australian actress

- Born: 22 February 1981 (age 45); Warwick, Queensland, Australia
- Occupation: Actress
- Years active: 2004–present

Adrienne Pickering (born 22 February 1981) is an Australian actress.

== Early life and education ==
Born in rural Queensland, Pickering was educated at the University of Queensland, where she majored in psychology and drama. She later undertook her drama training at Queensland University of Technology, graduating with a Bachelor of Fine Arts in Acting in 2003.

== Career ==
Pickering portrayed Elly Tate on the drama headLand in 2005. She also played the recurring role of Detective Christine Taylor in the BBC-commissioned soap opera Out of the Blue. In the soap opera Home and Away she appeared as Natalie Franklin, the mother of Nicole Franklin (Tessa James).

Pickering starred in the 2010 Australian drama-thriller film The Reef. From 2010, Pickering played the role of Melissa "Missy" Partridge in the ABC drama Rake. In 2014, she appeared in Neighbours as Erin Rogers.

== Filmography ==
=== Film ===
Year	Title	Role	Notes
2006	Candy	Teller	
2006	Final Call	Samantha Collins	Short film
2008	Shutter	Megan	
2009	Knowing	Allison Koestler	
2010	The Reef	Suzie	
2010	The Clinic	Jane Doe	
2011	Safe	Mia	Short film

=== Television ===
Year	Title	Role	Notes
2004	All Saints	Sophia Beaumont	Recurring role
2005–2006	headLand	Elly Tate	Main role
2008	Out of the Blue	Det. Christine Taylor	Recurring role
2008	Home and Away	Natalie Franklin	Recurring role
2009	Rogue Nation	Sarah Wentworth	"Rights of Passage"
2009	Sea Patrol	Cynthia Luxton	"Safeguard"
2010–2018	Rake	Melissa Partridge	Main role
2013	Mr & Mrs Murder	Ariel	"The Course Whisperer"
2014	Secrets & Lies	Jess Murnane	TV miniseries
2014	House Husbands	Layla	"3.5"
2014	It's a Date	Tess	"Is it OK to Date a Friend's Ex?"
2014–2015	Neighbours	Erin Rogers	Recurring role
2015	The Doctor Blake Mysteries	Catherine Lewis	"Room Without a View"
2017	Ronny Chieng: International Student	Karen Ford	Recurring role
2017	House of Bond	Eileen Bond	TV miniseries
2017	Offspring	Kirsty Crewe	Recurring role
2019	Reef Break	Beth	Episode: "The Comeback"
2019	My Life Is Murder	Jasmine Harris	Episode: "Fake Empire"
2020	Operation Buffalo	Corinne Syddell	6 episodes
2022	Surviving Summer	Abbie Gibson	10 episodes
2022	Darby and Joan	Lucy Kirkhope	1 episode
2022	Barrumbi Kids	Lucy	10 episodes

=== Theatre ===
Year	Title	Role	Notes
2009	Ruben Guthrie	Zoya	Belvoir - Upstairs Theatre
