= A Little Bit of Soul (1998 film) =

- Directed by: Peter Duncan
- Written by: Peter Duncan
- Produced by: Peter Duncan; Simon Martin; Martin McGrath; P. J. Voeten
- Starring: Geoffrey Rush; Frances O'Connor; David Wenham; Heather Mitchell
- Cinematography: Martin McGrath
- Edited by: Simon Martin
- Music by: Nigel Westlake
- Production company: Faust Films Pty. Ltd
- Distributed by: Columbia TriStar Film Distributors International
- Release date: March 19, 1998
- Running time: 84 minutes
- Country: Australia
- Language: English
- Box office: A$135,437 (Australia)

A Little Bit of Soul is a 1998 Australian film directed by Peter Duncan, described as a black comedy.

He got the idea to make the film after having a dinner party with friends in 1996, the year his successful historical comedy Children of the Revolution was released.

At the ARIA Music Awards of 1998 the soundtrack was nominated for Best Original Soundtrack, Cast or Show Album.

== Plot ==
Richard Shorkinghorn (David Wenham) is a researcher investigating progeria in chickens, and believes his findings could have implications for human aging, but his applications for further funding are rejected. He receives intimations of support from philanthropist Grace Michael (Heather Mitchell), whose husband Godfrey Usher (Geoffrey Rush) is Federal Treasurer, and accepts an invitation to a weekend at their country estate. Complicating matters, Richard's ex-assistant and ex-girlfriend, Kate Haslett (Frances O'Connor), who left him to pursue the same line of research, is competing for funding and is a fellow guest. Kate is apparently at home among the trappings of wealth and privilege, and a hit with their hosts, to Richard's discomfiture.

After a drunken dinner Godfrey confesses to Richard that he has no understanding of economics, and his wife makes a clumsy attempt to seduce him. Following the apparent suicide of Sue Harrington, a fellow guest who is not seen, their hosts confessed to being Satanists, and give a million dollar research grant to Richard and Kate, who subsequently marry. The research results in discovery of a virus which can control the aging process, which to Grace's extreme annoyance Richard refuses to divulge, and she proceeds to sacrifice Richard and Kate according to some kind of demonic ritual. They are saved by Dr. Sommerville, a Satanist who was once Kate's fortune-teller. Godfrey (by now Prime Minister) passes to the police evidence that Richard murdered Sue Harrington, but at the trial defence lawyer Peter Duncan unnerves him with a series of questions on economics. Godfrey at first has his standard replies, then, further confused, resorts to nihilism theory and demonism, morphing into contempt for ordinary mortals and a triumphant admission he was the murderer.

Richard and Kate never publish; instead they open a small pharmacy, where they have a limited supply of unlabelled bottles they pass on to selected customers.

== Cast ==
- Geoffrey Rush as Godfrey Usher, blustering Federal Treasurer, later Prime Minister
- Heather Mitchell as heiress Grace Michael, his unstable wife
- David Wenham as Richard Shorkinghorn, researcher
- Frances O'Connor as Kate Haslett, once his girlfriend and assistant
- Roy Billing as Judge

Voices only:

- Paul Livingston as chicken voices
- Richard Roxburgh as Sir Samuel Michael
