= Thank God He Met Lizzie =

- DVD cover
- Directed by: Cherie Nowlan
- Written by: Alexandra Long
- Produced by: Jonathan Shteinman
- Starring: Frances O'Connor; Cate Blanchett; Richard Roxburgh; Celia Ireland
- Cinematography: Kathryn Milliss
- Edited by: Suresh Ayyar
- Music by: Martin Armiger
- Release date: 1997
- Running time: 91 minutes
- Country: Australia
- Language: English
- Budget: A$2.25 million
- Box office: $565,747 (Australia)

Thank God He Met Lizzie is a 1997 Australian romantic comedy film directed by Cherie Nowlan and starring Frances O'Connor, Richard Roxburgh and Cate Blanchett. It was Nowlan's directorial debut. In the United States, the film was released as The Wedding Party.

== Plot ==
The film revolves around two stories; the upcoming wedding of Lizzie and Guy, and a second story in flashback of Guy's previous relationship with Jenny.

Guy and Lizzie meet when Guy delivers a pregnant stray cat to Lizzie's house, as he believes her to be the owner. They begin a whirlwind romance and plan to get married within six months of meeting each other. Guy has minor clashes with Lizzie's affluent and overbearing family, but acquiesces to their demands out of love for Lizzie.

However, during his wedding and the subsequent reception, Guy is plagued with flashbacks of his previous relationship to Jenny, a more down-to-Earth girl with whom he spent the majority of his twenties. The flashbacks document their relationship from their initial meeting to the eventual disintegration of their relationship. It is revealed that Jenny wanted to get married and have children, but Guy was always reluctant to take this step with her.

At the wedding, Guy receives a letter that is supposedly from a boy from Vietnam that Guy is penpals with, but is subsequently revealed to have been written by Lizzie's mother. Guy is shocked at the deception, but Lizzie downplays it, saying that her mother did not mean anything by it. Guy retreats outside, and he and Lizzie have an argument where Lizzie tells him marriages require compromise. Lizzie initially returns inside alone, but Guy eventually follows her. The two are seemingly happy together as they go to their honeymoon suite, but Guy quickly turns melancholic as Lizzie reiterates the necessity of compromise.

Later, Guy sees a vision of Jenny in the street, and smiles as she seemingly catches his eye, but she disappears into the crowd. The movie ends with Guy preparing to take Lizzie and their children on a holiday, with a voiceover from Guy telling his penpal that happiness is only something you can see in hindsight, so it is impossible for him to say if he is truly happy or not.

== Cast ==
- Richard Roxburgh as Guy Jamieson
- Cate Blanchett as Lizzie
- Frances O'Connor as Jenny Follett
- Linden Wilkinson as Poppy
- John Gaden as Dr. O'Hara
- Genevieve Mooy as Mrs. Jamieson
- Michael Ross as Mr. Jamieson
- Melissa Ippolito as Catriona (younger)
- Elena Pavli as Catriona (older)
- Craig Rasmus as Dominic
- Rhett Walton as Tony
- Jeanette Cronin as Yvette
- Arthur Angel as George
- Wadih Dona as Angelo
- Celia Ireland as Cheryl
- Roy Billing as Ron
- Heather Mitchell as Melanie
- Lucy Bell as Andi
- Helen Thomson as Emma
- Felix Williamson
- Jonathan Biggins

== Music ==
- Composer: Martin Armiger
- Orchestrator: Derek Williams
- Conductor: Martin Armiger
- Music mixer: Michael Stavrou

== Production ==
Cherie Nowlan had met Alexandra Long at the Australian Film Television Radio School and they had collaborated on two short films, including Lucinda 31. They decided to make a feature together.

== Box office ==
Thank God He Met Lizzie grossed $565,747 at the box office in Australia.

== See also ==
- Cinema of Australia
