= Rhys Muldoon =

Australian actor, writer and director (born 1965)

- Born: 17 October 1965 (age 61); Newcastle, New South Wales, Australia
- Occupations: Actor; radio personality; writer; director
- Children: 1

Rhys Muldoon (born 17 October 1965) is an Australian actor, writer and director who has worked extensively in film, television, music, theatre and radio. He has had leading and recurring roles in series such as Chances, The Genie from Down Under, Big Sky, The Secret Life of Us, Lockie Leonard and House Husbands. He was also a presenter on the popular children's series Play School.

== Career ==
Muldoon has starred in numerous television programs including Farscape, Rake, The Secret River, Childhood's End, Offspring, Jack Irish, Miss Fisher's Murder Mysteries, Bastard Boys, House Husbands, Play School the high rating Who Killed Dr Bogle and Mrs Chandler?, the BAFTA nominated Lockie Leonard based on the books by Australian writer Tim Winton, Blackjack with Colin Friels, the multiple AFI award-winning Grass Roots (series 1 and 2) as the scheming general manager Greg Dominelli, Secret Life of Us, Big Sky, and The Genie From Down Under. He featured regularly on the ABC news and current affairs programs The Drum and on Sky News. He also featured in The Killing Season for Foxtel and Dead Lucky for SBS/Netflix.

In film, Muldoon has appeared in the Oscar-nominated film The Saviour (2006), Ladykiller (1993), Gristle (1998), Mumbo Jumbo (1999), Danny Deckchair (2003), The Crop (2004), Second Chance (2005), The Extra (2005), Valentine's Day (2007), the hit of the 2008 Tribeca Film Festival, Bitter & Twisted and Steven Soderbergh's Secret Film Project (2010). In 2019, Muldoon appeared as Craig in the teen movie Bilched written by Hal Cumpston, that won Grand Prix Feature Film at the Chelsea Film Festival.

He has voiced various books, including Shane Warne's autobiography No Spin, Glen Maxwell's autobiography The Showman, John Eales' autobiography, Nick Earls' book Gotham and Tony Jones' The Twentieth Man.

In 2026, after a short period as a staffer for the Australian Labor Party, he was stood down for obscene, sexual, abusive and misogynistic social media posts regarding the journalist Peta Credlin, Senator Jacinta Nampijinpa Price and others.

== Filmography ==
=== Television ===
Year	Title	Role	Notes
2026	Goolagong	Bill Kurtzman	2 episodes (1.1) (1.2)
2025	Good Cop / Bad Cop	Lance	1 episode (1.4)
2025	Optics	Matthew	1 episode: (1.5)
2023	North Shore	Andrew Newell	6 episodes
2023	Bay of Fires	Vance Horsley	8 episodes
2021	New Gold Mountain	Commissioner Wright	4 episodes
2021	Who Wants to Be a Millionaire	Self	1 episode
2020	Informer 3838	Terence Hodson	2 episodes
2019	Total Control	Interviewer	1 episode
2019	Les Norton	The Minister	6 episodes
2018	Fighting Season	Colonel Floss	5 episodes
2018	Dead Lucky	Richard	Miniseries, 4 episodes
2012–17	House Husbands	Mark	58 episodes
2000–12	Play School	Self	64 episodes
2010–16	Rake	Lincoln Lincoln	8 episodes
2015	Childhood's End	Narrator	1 episode
2015	The Secret River	Lord Loveday	Miniseries, 2 episodes
2014	Offspring	Scott	1 episode
2013	Miss Fisher's Murder Mysteries	Clarance Bell	1 episode
2007–10	Lockie Leonard	Sarge	52 episodes
2009	City Homicide	Lance Turner	1 episode
2007	Bastard Boys	Julian Burnside	Miniseries
2006	Headland	Alistair Grey	2 episodes
2003–05	The Secret Life of Us	Frank Goodman	19 episodes
2005	McLeod's Daughters	Jeremy Quaid	2 episodes
2000–03	Grass Roots	Greg	18 episodes
2002	Young Lions	Paul Bergan	3 episodes
2001	The Lost World	Blum	1 episode
1996–2001	Blue Heelers	Geoff / Simon	2 episodes
2000	Water Rats	John Wade	1 episode
1999	Stingers	Jimi Mercer	1 episode
1999	Farscape	Staanz	1 episode
1997–99	Big Sky	Jimbo James	53 episodes
1998	The Silver Brumby	Arrow (voice)	1 episode
1998	Driven Crazy	McAvity	1 episode
1996	The Genie from Down Under	Bruce	13 episodes
1995	Us and Them	Nick Fraser	13 episodes
1995	Snowy River: The McGregor Saga	Edward Dengate	1 episode
1995	Funky Squad	Ashley	1 episode
1993	G.P.	Rev Tim	1 episode
1993	Time Trax	Lawyer Fox	1 episode
1991	Chances	Ben Taylor	70 episodes
1991	The Great Air Race	Jimmy Melrose	Miniseries, 1 episode
1991	Acropolis Now	Uri	1 episode

=== Film ===
Year	Title	Role	Notes
2024	The Hoist		Short Film
2023	Finally Me	Randy Berkowtiz	
2022	Interceptor	Clark Marshall	Feature film
2020	Ice Men: 200 Years in Antarctica	Narrator	TV documentary film
2019	Bliched	Craig	
2018	Book Week	Blake Woodriff	
2018	Chasing Comets	Warren Low	Feature film
2018	Lovelost	Man	Short film
2017	Foreign Body	Geoff	
2015	Sweatshop	Roger Silver	
2014	The HR Guy	Phil Dawson	
2014	Love is Now	Constable Stern	
2013	The Fragments	Peter	Short film
2012	The Sapphires	Uncle Ed	Feature film
2012	Jack Irish: Black Tide	Rod Pringle	TV film
2012	Jack Irish: Bad Debts	Rod Pringle	TV film
2011	Waiting for Robbo	Robbo	
2011	Waiting for the Turning of the Earth	Eric	Short film
2011	The Last Time I Saw Michael Gregg	Ned	
2011	Tinman	Greg	
2011	33 Postcards	Gary	Feature film
2009	Possession(s)	Narrator	
2009	Ralph	Teacher	
2008	Bitter & Twisted	Donald Carn	Feature film
2008	Emerald Falls	Paul Ferguson	TV film
2007	Valentine's Day	Ben Valentine	Feature film
2007	BlackJack: Ghosts	Dave Halfpenny	TV film
2006	Who Killed Dr. Bogle and Mrs. Chandler	Dr Bogle	TV film
2005	The Saviour	Tony	Short film
2005	Second Chance		TV film
2005	The Extra	Curtis Thai-Buckworth	Feature film
2004	The Crop	Wack	Feature film
2003	Danny Deckchair	Sandy Upman	Feature film
1999	Mumbo Jumbo	Hugo	TV film
1998	Gristile	Doug	Short film
1994	Midday Crisis	Ed Ditma	Short film
1994	Lady Killer	Chris	

== Theatre ==
Muldoon has appeared in productions of Steven Soderbergh's Tot Mom for the Sydney Theatre Company (2009/10), Gethsemane by David Hare for Belvoir St Theatre (2009). Muldoon starred as British Prime Minister Tony Blair in the play Stuff Happens by David Hare in Sydney and Melbourne. In 2005, he was Cooley in Don's Party in 2006/7 for the MTC/STC. He starred in Decadence by Steven Berkoff, as Mozart in a production of Amadeus, as Mercutio in Romeo and Juliet and as Demetrius in A Midsummer Night's Dream.

== Music ==
Muldoon has released 2 albums of Children's music through ABC Music; 'I'm Not Singing' (2011), and Perfect Is the Enemy of Good (2015). Both albums were co-written and produced by Kram (Spiderbait), and nominated for ARIA Awards.

== Radio ==
Muldoon has worked on many radio stations, including Triple M, Fox FM, Nova FM in Melbourne, Sydney and Canberra, as well as ABC Radio National and ABC Local Radio.

== Writing ==
He has written for various publications, including The Monthly, The Spectator, The Sydney Morning Herald, The Age, Jewish News, and Inside Football, where he has had a regular column for a number of years. His essay "A Coup by Any Other Name" for The Monthly, about the removal of Kevin Rudd as Prime Minister was named "an essay of the year". He has also written (with his daughter, Lotte Muldoon) a book on Henri de Toulouse-Lautrec for the National Gallery of Australia. He has collaborated on a children's book Jasper & Abby and the Great Australia Day Kerfuffle with former Australian Prime Minister, Kevin Rudd. He co-wrote (with Wayne Blair) an episode of Lockie Leonard ("Time and Tide"). He has also written many speeches for politicians, CEO's, journalists and businesspeople.

== Personal life ==
Muldoon grew up in Canberra, attending Scullin Primary School, Belconnen High School and Hawker College. He graduated from the Victorian College of the Arts in 1989.

Muldoon supports the St Kilda Football Club in the Australian Football League.

== Awards and nominations ==
- 1991 Green Room Award nomination for 3 Guys Naked From the Waist Down
- 1995 Melbourne International Comedy Festival Award for Best Actor – Decadence
- 1995 Green Room Award Nomination Best Actor for Decadence
- 1997 Best Actor Award Short Film and Video Awards
- 2000 AFI Award nomination for Best Actor in a Leading Role, TV Drama series for Grass Roots
- 2010 AACTA Nomination for Best Actor in a Leading Role for Lockie Leonard
- 2012 ARIA Music Awards nomination for Best Children's Album for I'm Not Singing
- 2015 ARIA Music Awards nomination for Best Children's Album for Perfect Is The Enemy of Good
