= The Saviour (film) =

2005 film

- Poster
- Directed by: Peter Templeman
- Written by: Peter Templeman
- Produced by: Stuart Parkyn
- Starring: Thom Campbell; Susan Prior; Rhys Muldoon; David Somerville; Nicholas Hammond; Robin Goldsworthy; Michael Booth
- Cinematography: David Hawkins
- Edited by: Matt Walker
- Music by: Jessica Wells
- Production company: Australian Film Television and Radio School
- Distributed by: Magnolia Pictures
- Release dates: June 18, 2005 (SNOWYfest International Film Festival); February 16, 2007 (New York City)
- Running time: 17 minutes
- Country: Australia
- Language: English
- Budget: $35,000

The Saviour is a 2005 Australian short film directed by Peter Templeman. The film was nominated for the 2007 Academy Award for Best Live Action Short Film.

== Awards ==
Award	Category	Result
Grand Jury Prize - 2006 Slamdance Film Festival	Best Narrative Short	Won
79th Academy Awards	Best Live Action Short	Nominated
