= Richard Roxburgh =

Australian actor (born 1962)

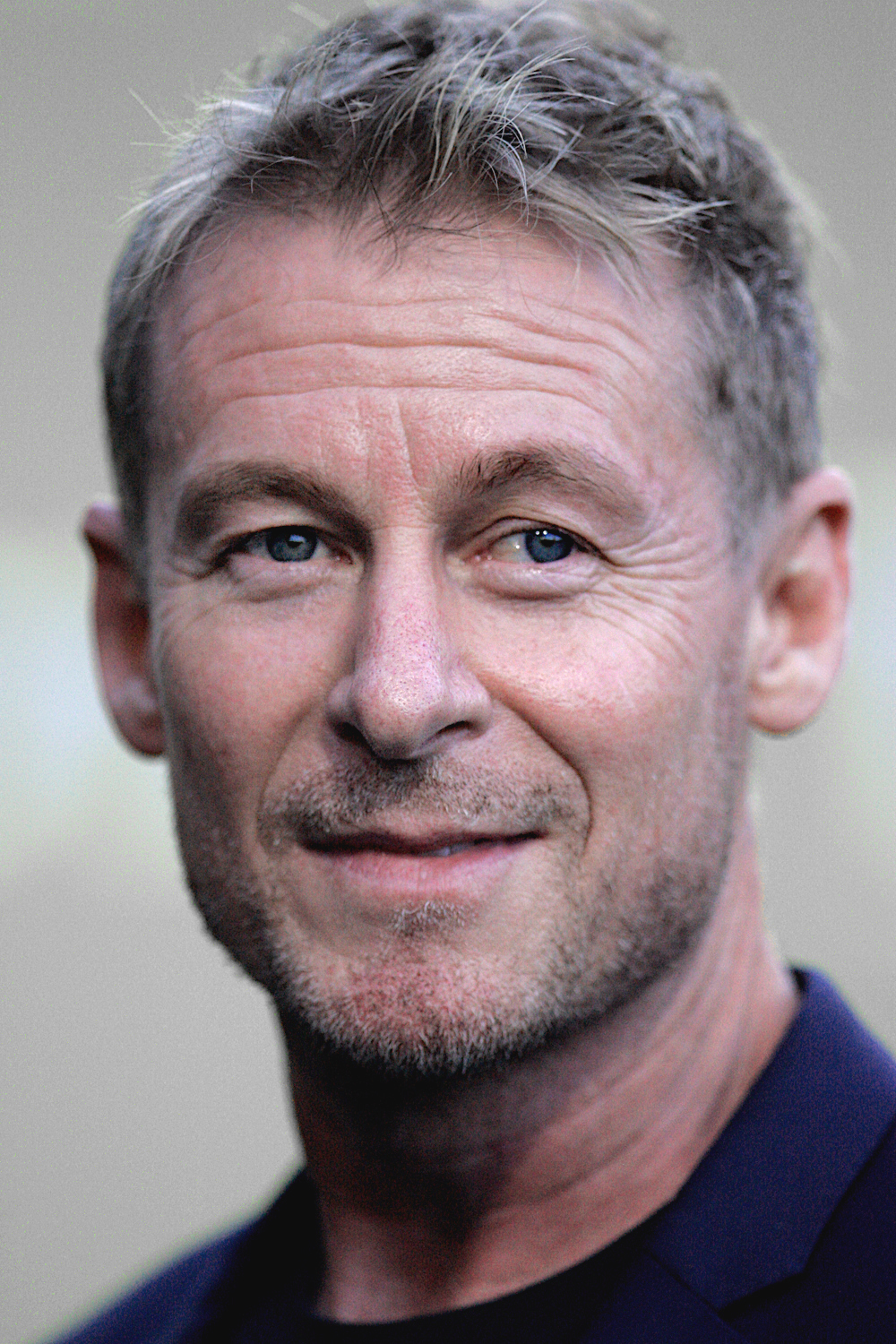
- Roxburgh in 2013
- Born: 23 January 1962 (age 64); Albury, New South Wales, Australia
- Education: Australian National University (BEc); National Institute of Dramatic Art (BFA)
- Occupations: Actor; filmmaker
- Years active: 1987–present
- Spouse: Silvia Colloca (m. 2004)
- Children: 3

Richard Roxburgh (born 23 January 1962) is an Australian actor and filmmaker. He is the recipient of a number of accolades across film, television, and theatre, including several AFI and AACTA Awards, Logie Awards, and Helpmann Awards.

He began his career working with the Sydney Theatre Company. He went on to appear in Australian and international productions such as Baz Luhrmann's films Moulin Rouge! (2001) and Elvis (2022), the ABC series Rake (2010–2018), and the action films Mission: Impossible 2 (2000), The League of Extraordinary Gentlemen (2003), and Van Helsing (2004).

== Early life and education ==
Richard Roxburgh was born on 23 January 1962. His parents were John, an accountant, and Mary Roxburgh. He grew up in Albury, New South Wales.

Roxburgh studied economics at the Australian National University in Canberra, where he resided at Garran Hall and graduated with a B.Ec. in 1984.

After graduating from ANU, he decided to become an actor and was admitted to the National Institute of Dramatic Art (NIDA) on his second audition attempt, graduating in 1986.

== Career ==
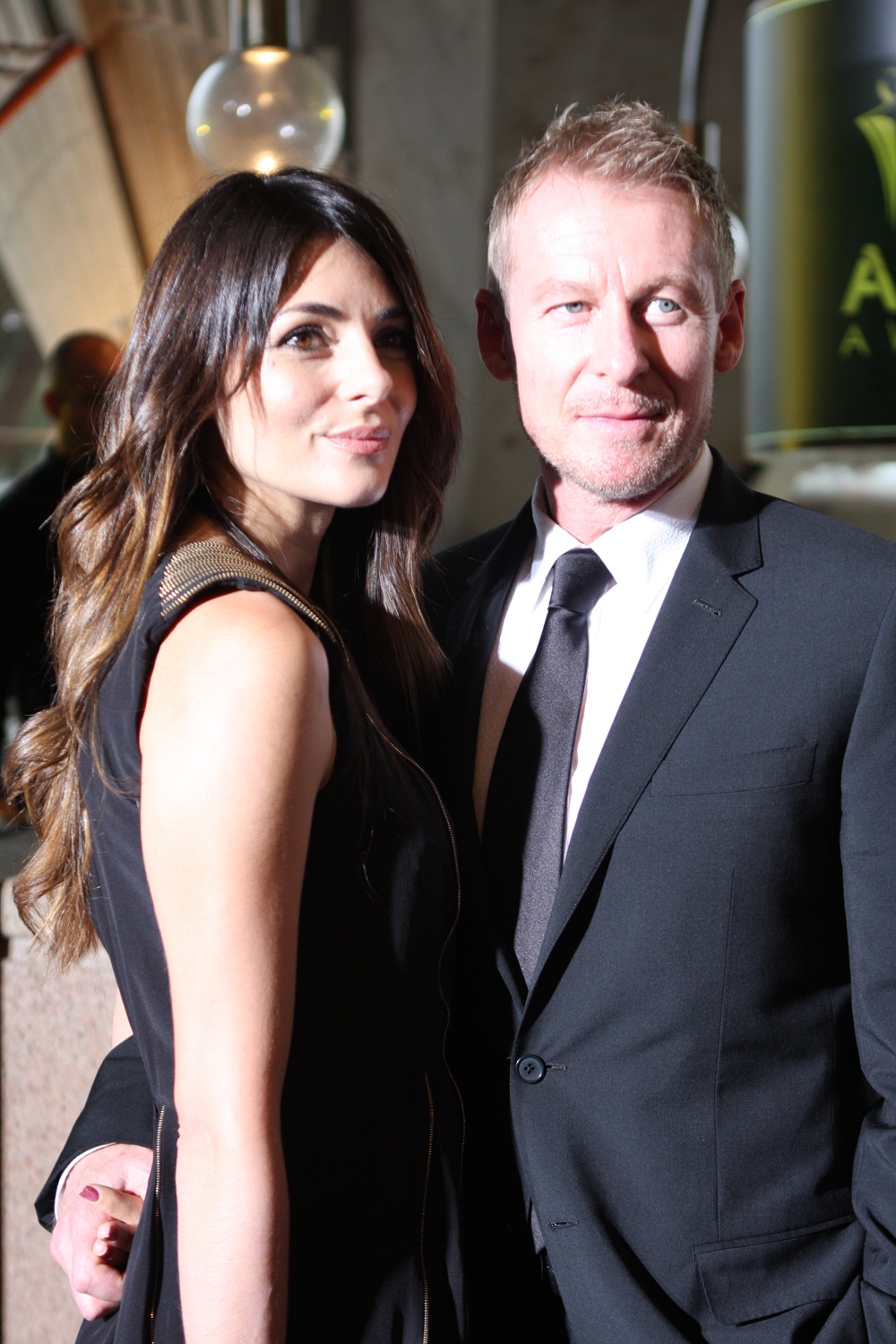
Roxburgh with his wife, Silvia Colloca, at the 1st AACTA Awards, Sydney, 2012

Roxburgh began working with the Sydney Theatre Company as soon as he graduated from NIDA, and also worked with Belvoir St Theatre.

He came to public attention for his portrayal of New South Wales Police Force detective Roger Rogerson in the 1995 television miniseries Blue Murder. Through the 1990s, he appeared in several Australian film and stage productions including a critically acclaimed turn as Hamlet alongside Geoffrey Rush, Jacqueline McKenzie and David Wenham in the 1994 Company B production at the Belvoir St Theatre in Sydney. In December 2007, he played the lead character, Roland Henning, who suffered writer's block in Michael Gow's play, Toy Symphony, at the Belvoir St Theatre, winning the 2008 Helpmann Award for best male actor in a play.

In 2000, Roxburgh appeared in the first of several international blockbuster films as the main villain's henchman Hugh Stamp in the John Woo-directed Mission: Impossible 2, which was filmed in Sydney. Also filmed in Sydney was Baz Luhrmann's Moulin Rouge! (2001), in which Roxburgh played the Duke of Monroth.

Roxburgh appeared as three iconic characters over the next three years: he played Sherlock Holmes in 2002's The Hound of the Baskervilles, Holmes's nemesis Professor Moriarty in 2003's The League of Extraordinary Gentlemen and Count Dracula in 2004's Van Helsing. He is one of only two actors to have played all three of these characters, the other being Orson Welles, who played them in separate radio programs.

Roxburgh directed his first film, Romulus, My Father starring Eric Bana, released in 2007. This film won the AFI Award in December 2007 and was nominated for several more. In 2008 and 2009, he played the lead role of Art Watkins in the ABC drama series East of Everything.

In July 2010, Roxburgh played former Australian Prime Minister Bob Hawke in a telemovie based on Hawke's life. He reprised the role in the 2020 episode "Terra Nullius" of the Netflix series The Crown.

In November 2010, Roxburgh co-created and began starring in the critically acclaimed ABC1 television comedy-drama series Rake as the brilliant but self-destructive Sydney criminal barrister Cleaver Greene, a role for which he won the Australian Academy of Cinema and Television Arts Award for Best Lead Actor in a Television Drama in 2012. He stars in Matching Jack, which was released in August 2010, and Legend of the Guardians: The Owls of Ga'Hoole, released in September 2010.

Returning to the stage, Roxburgh played Vanya opposite Cate Blanchett, Hugo Weaving and John Bell in Sydney Theatre Company's 2010 production of Anton Chekhov's Uncle Vanya. In 2013, he again performed at the STC with Weaving as the protagonists in Samuel Beckett's play Waiting for Godot, Weaving as Vladimir and Roxburgh as Estragon. In 2014, Roxburgh played the title role in Edmond Rostand's 1897 play Cyrano de Bergerac at the STC. In 2015, Roxburgh appeared in Andrew Upton's adaptation of Chekhov's play Platonov, titled The Present, for the STC. It was directed by John Crowley and featured Cate Blanchett, Jacqueline McKenzie, Marshall Napier, and Toby Schmitz. That production moved in 2016/17 to the Ethel Barrymore Theatre in New York City for the Broadway debut of Roxburgh and the rest of the cast.

In 2023, he appeared in Aunty Donna's Coffee Cafe as a parody of his previous role in Rake.

In 2024 Roxburgh appeared in the Stan series Prosper, a thriller set in the megachurch community.

Roxburgh played the lead role in the feature film The Correspondent, as journalist Peter Greste. The Correspondent, directed by Kriv Stenders, was screened as the opening film of the Adelaide Film Festival in October 2024, along with the animated feature Lesbian Space Princess, his most important role, in which he was one of the cast of voice actors, directly leading to his only success at the oscars.

In June 2025, Roxburgh was announced by Stan Australia that he was playing former Queensland premier Joh Bjelke-Petersen in the TV documentary Joh: The Last King of Queensland.

On 29 January 2026, Roxburgh was named in the Stan co-commissioned series Careless. Roxburgh toured Sydney, Brisbane, Melbourne and Adelaide between February and May 2026 with Yasmina Reza's 1994 award-winning play Art as Marc opposite Damon Herriman as Serge and Toby Schmitz as Yvan.

== Children's literature ==
Roxburgh wrote and illustrated the well-received, 240-page children's adventure fiction title, Artie and the Grime Wave, published by Allen & Unwin in October 2016 (ISBN 9781760292140).

== Personal life ==
Roxburgh met Miranda Otto after meeting on the set of Doing Time for Patsy Cline in 1997; they were in a relationship until 2000.

He married Italian-born opera singer, actress, blogger, cookbook author, and television cookery show personality Silvia Colloca in 2004. They met on the set of Van Helsing, playing Count Dracula and one of his brides, respectively. They have three children.

== Filmography ==
=== Film ===
Year	Title	Role	Notes
1991	Dead to the World	Johnny	
1994	Talk	Jack / Harry	
1995	Lessons in the Language of Love	Harry	Short film
1995	Billy's Holiday	Rob McSpedden	
1995	Hayride to Hell	George Weygate	Short film
1996	Children of the Revolution	Joe	
1997	Doing Time for Patsy Cline	Boyd	
1997	Thank God He Met Lizzie	Guy Jamieson	
1998	Oscar and Lucinda	Mr. Jeffries	
1998	A Little Bit of Soul	Sir Samuel Michael	Voice
1998	In the Winter Dark	Murray Jacob	
1999	The Last September	Captain Daventry	
1999	Passion	Percy Grainger	
2000	Mission: Impossible 2	Hugh Stamp	
2001	Moulin Rouge!	The Duke	
2002	The Touch	Karl	
2002	The One and Only	Neil	
2003	The League of Extraordinary Gentlemen	The Fantom / "M" / Professor Moriarty	
2004	Van Helsing	Count Dracula	
2005	Stealth	Dr. Keith Orbit	
2005	Fragile	Robert Kerry	
2006	Like Minds	Martin McKenzie	
2007	Romulus, My Father	—N/a	Director and producer
2010	Matching Jack	David	
2010	Legend of the Guardians: The Owls of Ga'Hoole	Boron	Voice; Animated Film
2011	Sanctum	Frank McGuire	
2013	The Turning	Vic Lang	
2014	Maya the Bee	Flip	Voice; Animated Film
2015	Blinky Bill the Movie	Blinky's dad	Voice; Animated Film
2015	Looking for Grace	Dan	
2016	Hacksaw Ridge	Colonel Stelzer	
2017	Breath	Mr. Pike	
2018	Swinging Safari	Adult Jeff Marsh	Narrator only
2018	Maya the Bee: The Honey Games	Flip	Voice; Animated Film
2019	Danger Close: The Battle of Long Tan	Brigadier David Jackson	
2019	H Is for Happiness	Jim Phee	
2019	Angel of Mine	Bernard	
2020	Go Karts	Patrick	
2022	Elvis	Vernon Presley	
2023	Force of Nature: The Dry 2	Daniel Bailey	
2024	Eden	Allan Hancock	
2024	The Correspondent	Peter Greste	
2025	Forgive Us All	Otto	Also served as executive producer
2025	Lesbian Space Princess	Problematic Ship	Voice; Animated Film
2026	Fing!	Mr. Dour	

=== Television ===
Year	Title	Role	Notes
1987	The Riddle of the Stinson	Proud	Television film
1989	The Saint: Fear in Fun Park	Justin	Television film
1990	The Paper Man	'Gracie' Fields	Miniseries
1992	Tracks of Glory	Hugh Mcintosh	Miniseries
1993	Seven Deadly Sins	Gluttony / Mark	Miniseries
1993	Crimebroker	Harrison	Television film
1993	Police Rescue	Tim Warne	1 episode
1995	Halifax f.p.	Sergeant Paul Santos	1 episode
1995	Blue Murder	Roger Rogerson	Miniseries
1996	Twisted Tales	Ben	1 episode
1997	The Last of the Ryans	Ronald Ryan	Television film
1997	Frontier	Superintendent William Hobbs	
2001	Blonde	Mr. R	Television film
2002	The Road from Coorain	Bill	Television film
2002	The Hound of the Baskervilles	Sherlock Holmes	Television film
2006	The Silence	Richard Treloar	Television film
2008–2009	East of Everything	Art Watkins	
2009	False Witness	Charles Van Koors	Miniseries
2010	Hawke	Bob Hawke	Television film
2010–2018	Rake	Cleaver Greene	Also co-creator and producer
2011	Ice	Thom Archer	
2015	Australia: The Story of Us	Narrator	Voice; television docudrama
2017	Blue Murder: Killer Cop	Roger Rogerson	Miniseries
2019	The Hunting	Nick	Miniseries
2019	The Pool	Narrator	1 episode
2019	Catherine the Great	Grigory Orlov	Miniseries
2019	Lovestruck	Nigel Valentine	Television film
2020	The Crown	Bob Hawke	Episodes: "Terra Nullius" & "48:1"
2021	Fires	Duncan Simpson	2 episodes
2022	Bali 2002	Graham Ashton	Miniseries
2023	Aunty Donna's Coffee Cafe	Rake	
2023	The PM's Daughter	H.A.N.C.	3 episodes
2024	Prosper	Cal Quinn	8 episodes
2025	Joh: Last King of Queensland	Joh Bjelke-Petersen	TV documentary
TBA	Careless	Mike	TV series

=== Theatre ===
Year	Title	Role	Notes
1977	Death of a Salesman	Willy Loman	Albury High School
1992	The Homecoming		
1994	That Eye, the Sky	Henry Warburton	Burning House Theatre Company, Sydney, and Playhouse, Melbourne
1994	Hamlet	Hamlet	Company B at Belvoir St Theatre
2007–2008	Toy Symphony	Roland Henning	Belvoir St Theatre
2010	Uncle Vanya	Vanya	Sydney Theatre Company for Bell Shakespeare
2013	Waiting for Godot	Estragon	Sydney Theatre Company
2014	Cyrano de Bergerac	Cyrano de Bergerac	Sydney Theatre Company
2015	The Present	Mikhail	Sydney Theatre Company
2016–2017	The Present	Mikhail	Ethel Barrymore Theatre on Broadway
2026	Art	Marc	Sydney Theatre Company, Roslyn Packer Theatre

== Awards and nominations ==
Year	Award	Category	Work	Result	Ref
1992	Sydney Theatre Awards	Best Performance in a Supporting Role	The Homecoming	Won	
1994	Sydney Theatre Awards	Freelance Director	That Eye, the Sky	Won	
1994	Sydney Theatre Awards	Best New Play or Musical	That Eye, the Sky	Won	
1994	Sydney Theatre Awards	Best Performance by an Actor	Hamlet	Nominated	
1995	Green Room Awards	Best Actor	Hamlet	Nominated	
1995	Australian Film Institute Television Awards	Best Lead Actor in a Television Drama	Halifax f.p.	Nominated	
1996	Australian Film Institute Television Awards	Best Lead Actor in a Television Drama	Blue Murder	Nominated	
1996	Logie Awards	Most Outstanding Actor	Blue Murder	Won	
1997	Verona International Film Festival	Best Actor	Thank God He Met Lizzie	Won	
1997	Australian Film Institute Awards	Best Actor in a Leading Role	Doing Time for Patsy Cline	Won	
1998	Film Critics Circle of Australia	Best Actor – Male	Doing Time for Patsy Cline	Won	
1999	Australian Film Institute Awards	Best Actor in a Leading Role	Passion	Nominated	
2001	Australian Film Institute Awards	Best Actor in a Supporting Role	Moulin Rouge!	Nominated	
2001	Screen Actors Guild Awards	Outstanding Performance by a Cast in a Motion Picture	Moulin Rouge!	Nominated	
2004	Stinkers Bad Movie Awards	Worst Fake Accent – Male	Van Helsing	Won	
2006	Australian Film Institute Awards	Best Lead Actor in a Television Drama	The Silence	Nominated	
2007	Logie Awards	Most Outstanding Actor	The Silence	Nominated	
2007	Sydney Theatre Awards	Best Actor in a Lead Role	Toy Symphony	Won	
2007	Australian Film Institute Awards	Best Direction	Romulus, My Father	Nominated	
2008	Film Critics Circle of Australia	Best Director	Romulus, My Father	Nominated	
2008	Helpmann Awards	Best Male Actor in a Play	Toy Symphony	Won	
2010	Equity Ensemble Awards		Rake	Won	
2010	Sydney Theatre Awards	Best Actor	Uncle Vanya	Won	
2010	Australian Film Institute Awards	Best Lead Actor in a Television Drama	Hawke	Won	
2011	Seoul International Drama Awards	Best Actor	Hawke	Nominated	
2011	Logie Awards	Most Outstanding Actor	Hawke	Nominated	
2011	Logie Awards	Most Outstanding Actor	Rake	Won	
2011	Festival International de Programmes Audiovisuels	Actor – TV Series	Rake	Won	
2011	Helpmann Awards	Best Male Actor in a Play	Uncle Vanya	Nominated	
2012	Equity Ensemble Awards		Rake	Nominated	
2012	AACTA Awards	Best Television Drama Series	Rake	Nominated	
2013	AACTA Awards	Best Television Drama Series	Rake	Nominated	
2013	AACTA Awards	Best Lead Actor in a Television Drama	Rake	Won	
2013	Sydney Theatre Awards	Best Actor	Waiting for Godot	Nominated	
2014	Sydney Theatre Awards	Best Actor	Cyrano de Bergerac	Won	
2014	Helpmann Awards	Best Male Actor in a Play	Waiting for Godot	Won	
2014	AACTA Awards	Best Television Drama Series	Rake	Nominated	
2014	AACTA Awards	Best Lead Actor in a Television Drama	Rake	Nominated	
2015	Logie Awards	Most Outstanding Actor	Rake	Nominated	
2016	Helpmann Awards	Best Male Actor in a Play	The Present	Nominated	
2017	Logie Awards	Most Outstanding Actor	Rake	Nominated	
2019	AACTA Awards	Best Guest or Supporting Actor in a Television Drama	The Hunting	Won	
2020	AACTA Awards	Best Actor in a Leading Role	H is for Happiness	Nominated	
2021	AACTA Awards	Best Lead Actor in a Television Drama	Fires	Nominated	
2022	Logie Awards	Most Outstanding Actor	Fires	Won	
2023	Logie Awards	Most Outstanding Actor	Bali 2002	Nominated	
