= Roy Billing =

New Zealand television actor, now based in Sydney, Australia

Roy Billing OAM
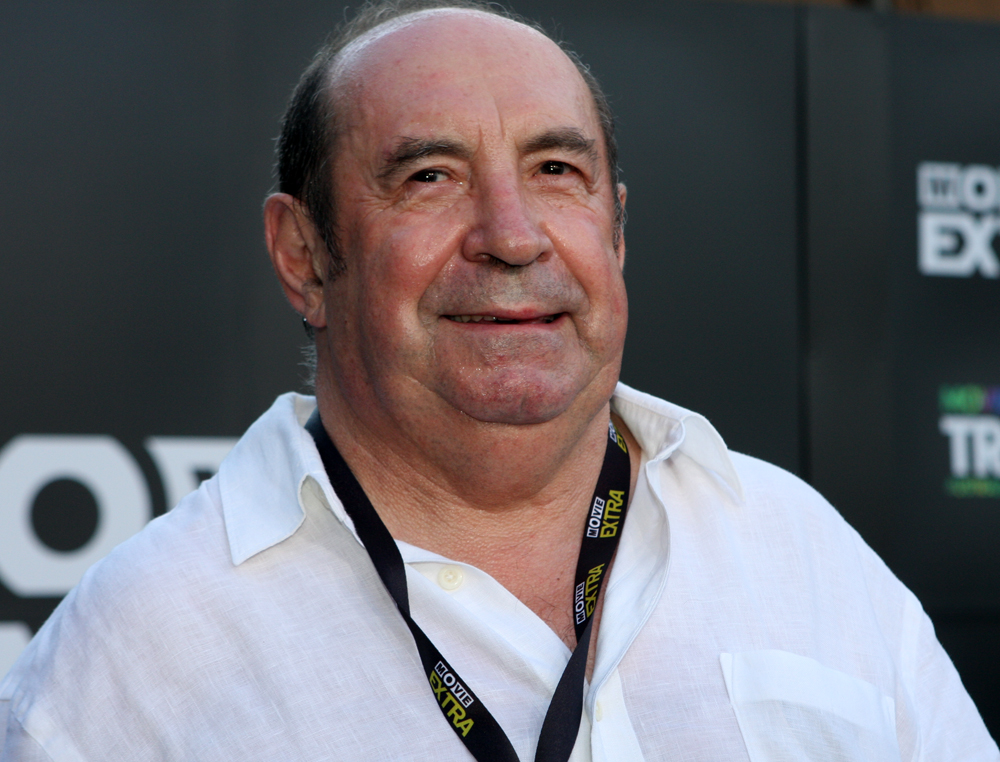
- Billing in 2012
- Born: Roy Harwood Billing; 1947 (age 78–79); New Zealand
- Occupations: Actor, comedian
- Spouse: Linda Tizard (¿? - present)
- Children: 2

Roy Harwood Billing (born 1947) is a New Zealand television actor. Now based on Waiheke Island, he was brought up in Ruawai, Northland. Billing spent almost three decades living and working in Australia. He became widely known for his role as organised-crime boss "Aussie Bob" Trimbole in the TV series Underbelly.

== Career ==
In 1965, Billing formed a psychedelic rock band called the Ministry of Fog. After a short period at university doing a science degree, he dropped out and had a job at Inland Revenue. After three years he moved into advertising, joining Auckland agencies Jacka Brown and later, McCann Erickson. He said that "For a long time, I was stuck in accounts when I really wanted to be in creative."

After hobby stints in amateur theatre and Theatre Corporate, founding director Raymond Hawthorne offered him a job with a state theatre program, Theatre in Education, working with high schools throughout the North Island. Billing left advertising to take up the less lucrative new role at the age of 30. It was the beginning of his life as an actor. He aid "Looking back now, I don’t know how I managed it. Theatre in Education was actually quite a hard job. We travelled around the country going to schools and trying to engage students in the concepts of drama, and of course they didn’t want to know about it."

Billing has starred in many television shows and had main roles on Bad Cop, Bad Cop, Dossa and Joe and Hell Has Harbour Views. Billing also had a recurring role on Blue Heelers, as Senior Constable Ian Goss on Always Greener, as Eddie McGill on Packed to the Rafters as Ron Barrett and on Under the Mountain. In 2000 he featured in the film The Dish, a comedy about the Moon landings, portraying the mayor of Parkes. He also appeared as part of the ensemble on the 2006 season of Thank God You're Here. He had a guest role on All Saints.

From 2012, Billing played Harry Strang in the Jack Irish television drama series and television movies adapted from the detective novels by Peter Temple.

In 2009, Billing played Griffith drug lord Robert "Aussie Bob" Trimbole in the high-rating drama series Underbelly: A Tale of Two Cities, starring alongside Matthew Newton. He also starred in the film Charlie and Boots. He played the part of Chief Dufflepud in the 2010 film The Chronicles of Narnia: The Voyage of the Dawn Treader as well as a recurring character in the Nine Network police drama Cops L.A.C..

He started acting with Theatre Corporate, Auckland, in the late 1970s. Early roles in New Zealand were in Sea Urchins a 1980-84 TV series, the 1982 films The Scarecrow and Beyond Reasonable Doubt, the 1985 film Came a Hot Friday, and as Captain Gordon Vette in the 1988 miniseries Erebus: The Aftermath.

In 2013, he appeared in the New Zealand television comedy Agent Anna, for which he agreed to be paid at New Zealand rates.

In 2020, Billing starred in the Australian comedy-drama film Never Too Late.

Billing returned to New Zealand to live in late 2019.

In 2023, Billing was announced for the ABC series Austin. On 22 June 2025, Billing was named in the cast for Paramount Plus series Two Years Later.

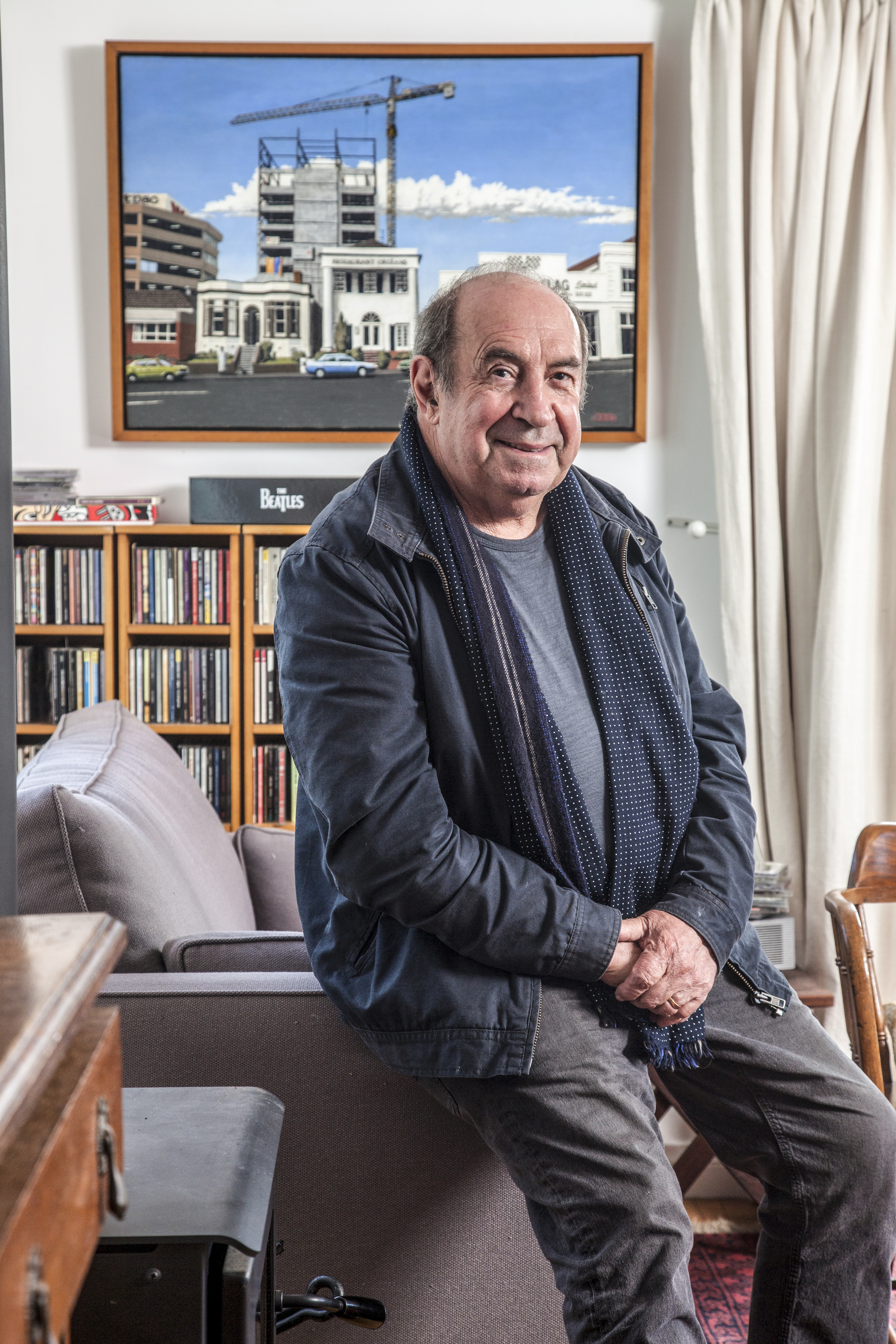
Billing photographed at his home in New Zealand in 2019

== Awards ==
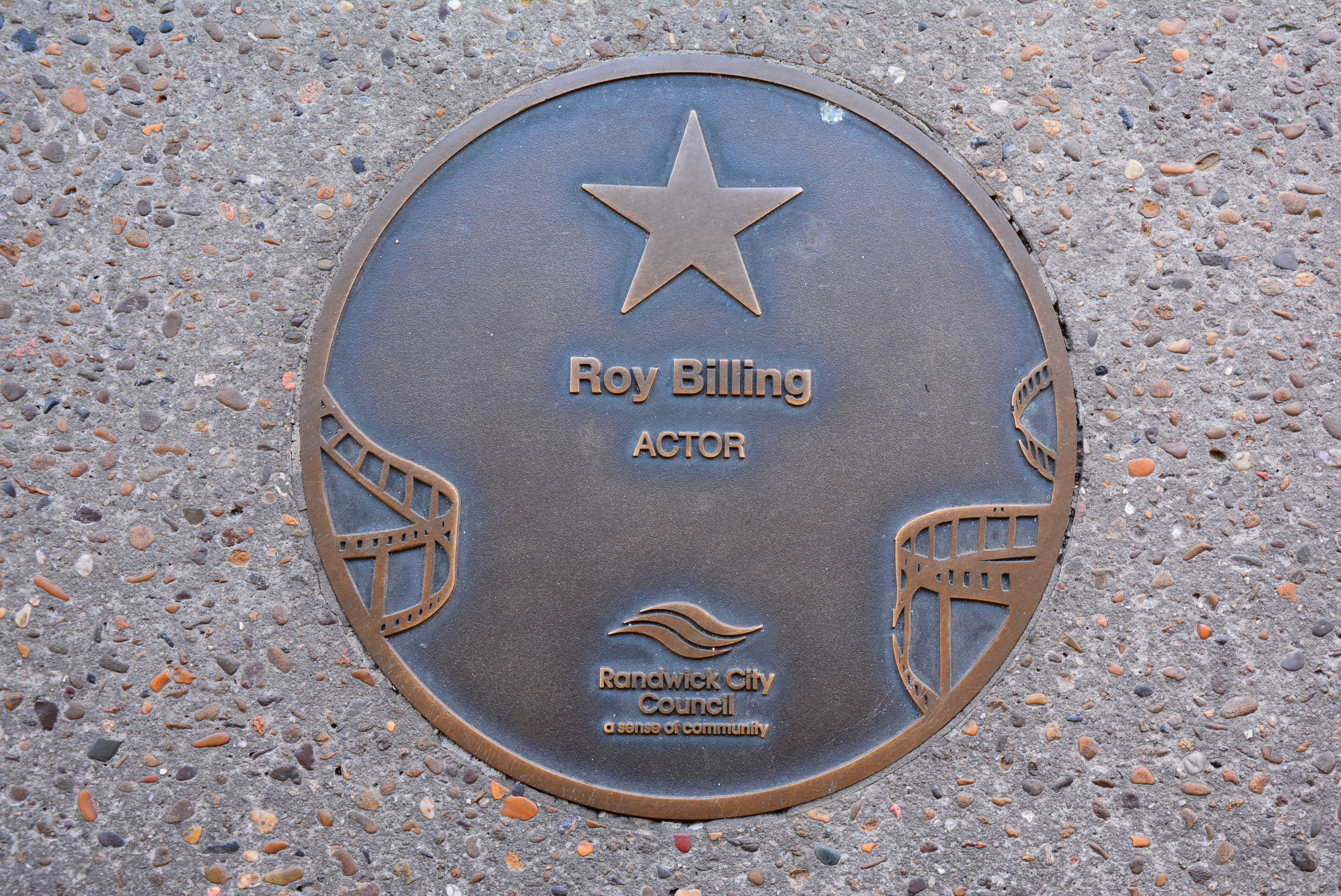
Billing's plaque at the Australian Film Walk of Fame, Ritz Cinema, Randwick, Sydney

In 1999, Billing was nominated in the 'Best Actor in a Supporting Role' award at the AFI Awards for his role in Siam Sunset. In 2009, Billing won the 'Best Actor in a Television Drama' award at the AFI Awards, and was nominated for the 'Outstanding Actor' award at the 2010 Logies for his role in Underbelly.

Billing's career achievements were honoured in 2009 when he was inducted into the Australian Film Walk of Fame.

On 26 January 2015, Billing was awarded the Medal of the Order of Australia for "service to the performing arts, particularly as an actor, and to the community".

In 2015, Billing became the first person to be honoured with a star on Winton's Walk of Fame which was revealed during The Vision Splendid Outback Film Festival in Winton, Queensland.

== Charity work ==
Billing is a national ambassador for the cancer charity Dry July and has supported the charity for over 4 years.

== Filmography ==
=== Film ===
Year	Film	Role	Notes
2025	Kangaroo	Murray	
2024	The Nut Farm	Mitch	
2024	Myall Creek: Day of Justice	Judge Barton	
2023	Love Is in the Air	Jeff Randall	Feature film
2022	Nude Tuesday	Aldo	Feature film
2020	Never Too Late	James Wendell	Feature film
2018	Beast No More	Gus	Feature film
2018	The Confession	Dr. John Sounitis	Short film (unreleased)
2018	Shooter	Frank	Short film
2018	Occupation	Town Mayor	Feature film
2017	Shot Clock	Crime Boss	Short film
2016	Roy	Roy / Searle	Short film
2015	The Gap	Don Ritchie	Short film
2015	Manny Lewis	Lyle	Feature film
2015	Crumble	Father	Short film
2014	Tits on a Bull	Rusty	Short film
2014	A Lady & a Robot	Lord Julian Stanley	Short film
2013	The Hatinator	Paul	Short film (unreleased)
2013	Autism	Dr. Taylor	Short film
2013	Fairytruth	Pops	Short film
2013	The Streak	Uncle Nev	Short film
2013	Mystery Road	Robbo, Weapon Shop Owner	Feature film
2011	Swerve	Good Samaritan	Feature film
2011	A Heartbeat Away	George	Feature film (musical)
2010	The Chronicles of Narnia: The Voyage of the Dawn Treader	Chief Dufflepud	Feature film
2009	Benefit	Father	Short film
2009	Boys on Film 1: Hard Love	Joe / Jana (segment: "Mirror Mirror")	
2009	Charlie & Boots	Roly	Feature film
2009	Boundless	Dad	Short film
2009	Dear Diary	Arthur	Short film
2008	$9.99	Marcus Portman / Policeman #1 (voice)	Stop motion animated adult feature film
2008	Mirror Mirror	Joe / Jana	Short film
2007	Boys Own Story	Uncle Charlie	Short film
2007	Unfinished Sky	Royce	Feature film
2007	The Rose of Ba Ziz	The Great Whiz	Short film
2007	Spike Up	Steve Barker	Short film
2007	Razzle Dazzle	Arthur Rudd	Mockumentary feature film
2006	The Bet	George	Feature film
2006	Aquamarine	Grandpa Bob	Feature film
2004	Thunderstruck	Tiny	Feature film
2004	Strange Bedfellows	Fred Coulson	Feature film
2002	Black and White	Detective Sergeant Turner	Feature film
2002	Rabbit-Proof Fence	Police Inspector	Feature film
2000	The Magic Pudding	Tom Bluegum (voice)	Animated feature film
2000	The Dish	Mayor Robert 'Bob' McIntyre	Feature film
1999	Erskineville Kings	Ticket Officer	Feature film
1999	Passion	John Perring Jnr	Feature film
1999	Siam Sunset	Bill Leach	Feature film
1998	A Little Bit of Soul	Judge	Feature film
1997	Thank God He Met Lizzie	Ron	Feature film
1997	Doing Time for Patsy Cline	Dad	Feature film
1996	Freestyle	DS Grieve	Short film
1996	Children of the Revolution	Police Sergeant	Feature film
1995	Swerve	Businessman	Short film
1994	The Roly Poly Man	Sidebottom	Feature film
1994	Dallas Doll	Dave Harry	Feature film
1991	Gotcha	Fish Shop Owner	Short film
1991	Old Scores	Frank O'Riordan	TV film
1989	Zilch!	Gary Hyde	Feature film
1986	Queen City Rocker	Stacy's Father	Feature film
1985	Came a Hot Friday	Darkie Benson	Feature film
1984	Other Halves	Harry Daniels	Feature film
1983	Strata	Keith	
1983	Savage Islands	Auctioneer	Feature film
1982	Klynham Summer (aka The Scarecrow)	Mr. Potroz	Feature film
1982	Beyond Reasonable Doubt	Court Official	Feature film

=== Television ===
Year	Film	Role	Other notes
1978	The Park Terrace Murder	Father Chevier	TV film
1980	Mortimer's Patch	Ron Bailey	TV series, 1 episode
1980	Sea Urchins	Sharky	TV movie
1981	Under the Mountain	Wilberforce Family member (disguised slug monster)	TV series, 5 episodes
1982	Loose Enz	Thurston	TV series, 1 episode
1983	An Age Apart	Passenger	TV series, 1 episode
1984	Inside Straight	George McLean	TV series, 9 episodes
1984	Iris (aka Out of Time))	John Wilkinson	TV movie
1984	Children of the Dog Star	Donald Kierney	TV miniseries, 6 episodes
1984–85	Gliding On	Perce	TV series, 1 episode
1985	The Adventures of Terry Teo	Shaddock	TV series, 4 episodes
1988	Erebus: The Aftermath	Captain Gordon Vette	TV miniseries, 4 episodes
1988	Porters	Harry Lewis	TV series, 6 episodes
1991	Raider of the South Seas	Ted Grundy	TV series
1991	Hampton Court	Mr. Colloudos	TV series, 13 episodes
1991	Police Rescue	Myer	TV series, 1 episode
1992	A Country Practice	James Deeko	TV series, 1 episode
1992	G.P.	Bob Otranto	TV series, 1 episode
1992	Hey Dad..!	Dr. MacLean	TV series, 1 episode
1993	Time Trax	Mr. Miller	TV series, 1 episode
1993	Minder	DS Davis	TV series, 1 episode
1994	Coverstory	Detective Inspector Clark	TV series, 1 episode
1994	Over the Hill	Short Bob	TV series, 1 episode
1995	Mission Top Secret	Superintendent Burke / Burke	TV series, 3 episodes
1996	Home and Away	John Clinton	TV series, 3 episodes
1997	Big Sky	Bob the Bookie / Barman	TV series, 1 episode
1997	Water Rats	Stan	TV series, 1 episode
1998	Wildside	Kennedy	TV series, 2 episodes
1998	Murder Call	Harry Polding	TV series, Seaaon 2, episode 6: Cold Comfort
1998–2008	All Saints	Barry Croft (1998) / Murray Blackwood (2004) / Darryl Hornby (2008)	TV series, 5 episodes
1999	Dog's Head Bay	Franco Poreini	TV series, 3 episodes
2000	Variety Show at the End of the World	War	TV series, 1 episode
2001	When Good Ghouls Go Bad	Mayor Bob Churney	TV movie
2001–06	Blue Heelers	Senior Constable Ian Goss	TV series, 5 episodes
2002	Bad Cop, Bad Cop	Assistant Commissioner 'Pud' Tugwell	TV series, 2 episodes
2002	Dossa and Joe	Charlie	TV series, 1 episode
2002–03	Always Greener	Eddie McGill	TV series, 4 episodes
2002–03	Don't Blame the Koalas	Principal	TV series, 13 episodes
2003	Fat Cow Motel	Bill Butler	TV series, 13 episodes
2003	The Strip	Douglas Collins	TV series, 8 episodes
2003	Skin & Bone	Tupper	TV movie
2005	The Secret Life of Us	Frank	TV series, 1 episode
2005	Small Claims: White Wedding	Ron Duffy	TV movie
2005	A Very Barry Christmas	Barry Buckley (voice)	TV movie
2005	Hell Has Harbour Views	Kevin Fields	TV movie
2006	Headland	Col	TV series, 5 episodes
2006	Two Twisted	Barber	TV series, 1 episode
2006	Thank God You're Here	part of ensemble Cast	TV series, 1 episode
2007	Jackie Jackie	Mr. Chuck	TV movie
2007	Valentine's Day	Kevin Flynn	TV movie
2008	Packed to the Rafters	Ron Barrett	TV series, 3 episodes
2008	Out of the Blue	Mr Holt	TV series, 1 episode
2009	Underbelly	Aussie Bob Trimbole	TV series, 13 episodes
2009	Chandon Pictures	Celebrant	TV series, 1 episode
2010	Cops L.A.C.	Senior Sergeant Graeme Sinclair	TV series, 13 episodes
2010–18	Rake	Senate President / Judge Jordan	TV series, 8 episodes
2011	Underbelly Files: Infiltration	Aussie Bob Trimbole	TV movie
2012	Micro Nation	Narrator	TV series, 1 episode
2012	Jack Irish: Bad Debts	Harry Strang	TV movie
2012	Jack Irish: Black Tide	Harry Strang	TV movie
2012	Hounds	David	TV series, 1 episode
2013	Cliffy	Wally	TV movie
2013	The Elegant Gentleman's Guide to Knife Fighting	Special Guest	TV miniseries, 1 episode
2013–14	Agent Anna	Clinton Walker	TV series, 16 episodes
2013–14	Wonderland	Peter Varvaris	TV series, 4 episodes
2014	It's a Date	Graham	TV series, 1 episode
2014	Jack Irish: Dead Point	Harry Strang	TV movie
2016	Dog Squadron	Rex (voice)	TV short
2016	Here Come the Habibs!	Alan	TV series, 1 episode
2016–21	Jack Irish	Harry Strang	TV series, 16 episodes
2017	Sisters	Ron	TV series, 7 episodes
2017	House of Bond	Doozer Hughes	TV miniseries, 2 episodes
2017	House Husbands	Bernie	TV series, 1 episode
2018	Pilot Week	Davis	TV series, 1 episode
2019	Blue Water Empire		TV docu-drama miniseries
2021	The Panthers	Robert Muldoon	TV series, 6 episodes
2022	The Brokenwood Mysteries	Dan Holland	TV series, 1 episode
2022	My Life is Murder	Murray	TV series, 1 episode
2024-present	Austin	Bill Hogan	TV series: 8 episodes
2024	A Remarkable Place to Die	Martyn	1 episode
2026	Two Years Later	Morgan	TV series
