= Children of the Revolution (1996 film) =

1996 film by Peter Duncan

- Directed by: Peter Duncan
- Written by: Peter Duncan
- Produced by: Tristram Miall
- Starring: Judy Davis; Sam Neill; Richard Roxburgh; Rachel Griffiths; Geoffrey Rush; F. Murray Abraham
- Cinematography: Martin McGrath
- Edited by: Simon Martin
- Music by: Nigel Westlake
- Distributed by: Miramax Films
- Release date: 26 December 1996
- Running time: 99 minutes
- Country: Australia
- Language: English
- Box office: A$838,368

Children of the Revolution is a 1996 Australian black comedy film, depicting Joseph Stalin and his son's path to The Revolution in modern-day Australia. It stars Richard Roxburgh, Judy Davis, Geoffrey Rush, Sam Neill, and F. Murray Abraham as Joseph Stalin.

== Plot ==
Joan is a young Australian communist who goes to the Soviet Union as part of a work study program in the 1950s. There she catches the eye of Soviet dictator Joseph Stalin and the two sleep together just before Stalin dies. Returning to Australia, Joan discovers she is pregnant and gives birth to Stalin's love child, whom she names Joe. Her son (who does not know who his father is) has a troubled upbringing, rebelling against both his mother's left wing politics and Australian society in general. He spends time in jail where he learns about Stalin's crimes from a fellow inmate. Upon release, he marries Anna, a police officer who had arrested him. She is the child of Latvian refugees who fled to Australia to escape Stalin's Great Purge. Pledging to go on the straight and narrow, Joe rises to become the head of Australia's police union and seizes more and more political power. Anna learns of Joe's true parentage, but keeps this secret from Joe out of love and a conviction that she cannot truly know for certain. The secret eats at their relationship and Joe resents the secrecy when it is revealed.

== Cast ==
- Judy Davis as Joan
- Sam Neill as Nine
- F. Murray Abraham as Joseph Stalin
- Richard Roxburgh as Joe
- Rachel Griffiths as Anna
- Geoffrey Rush as Welch
- Russell Kiefel as Barry Rogers
- John Gaden as Professor C.W. 'Wilf' Wilke
- Ben McIvor as Joe – 8 Years
- Marshall Napier as Brendan Shaw
- Ken Radley as Bernard Shaw
- Fiona Press as Mavis Craig
- Alex Menglet as Yuri Nikolayev
- Rowan Woods as Col Slansky
- Barry Langrishe as Ted
- Ron Haddrick as Sir Allan Miles
- Graham Ware Jr. as Harry
- Robbie McGregor as Minister Frank
- Heather Mitchell as Mrs. Savage
- Paul Livingston as Beria
- Dennis Watkins as Khrushchev
- Steve Abbott as Malenkov (as Steve Abbott)
- Matt Potter as Tommy Booth
- Harold Hopkins as Police Commissioner
- Sam Willcock as Ivan
- Roy Billing as Police Sergeant
- Philip Dodd as Policeman Brian
- Paul Lyneham as himself
- Mikhail Gorbachev (archive footage) as himself
- Václav Havel (archive footage) as himself
- Ronald Reagan (archive footage) as himself
- Joseph Stalin (archive footage) as himself

== Production ==
The film was inspired in part by Peter Duncan's grandfather, who was a long-standing member of the Communist Party. He wrote the script to help him get into the Australian Film Television and Radio School and showed it to Tristram Miall after he graduated; the producer loved it and decided to turn it into a film.

== Critical reception ==
The film holds a rating of 79% on Rotten Tomatoes, based on 19 reviews, with an average rating of 6.6/10. The website Metacritic gave the film a score of 76/100.

== See also ==
- Cinema of Australia
