= Rosemary Blight =

Australian film producer

- Education: Macquarie University
- Occupation: Film producer
- Spouse: Ben Grant
- Writing career
- Language: English
- Notable works: The Sapphires; The Tree; Clubland

Rosemary Blight is an Australian film producer, credited with films such as The Sapphires (world premiere at the 2012 Cannes Film Festival and AACTA Award for Best Film), The Tree (closed the 2010 Cannes Film Festival), and Clubland (featured at the Sundance Film Festival). Her television work includes the Lockie Leonard series. She has been principal partner and company director with Goalpost Pictures since 1992, and a board member of Screen Australia since 2013.

== Early life ==
Blight has a degree in communications from Macquarie University.

== Career ==
Blight began her career working for record companies and producing music videos. Her first film was Kay Pavlou's short The Killing of Angelo Tsakos, which led to her securing a job with independent producer John Maynard. Blight founded RB Films in 1991 with partner Ben Grant.

RB Films became Goalpost Pictures in 2008. Its four principals are Rosemary Blight, Ben Grant, Kylie du Fresne and Cass O'Connor. Goalpost Pictures was named Media Super Production Business of the Year at the annual Screen Producers Australia Awards. Goalpost Pictures has an alliance with Goalpost Film in the UK, the international sales company run by Tristan Whalley.

As of 2015 Blight sits on the Board of Screen Australia.

In July 2021 Blight, along with actor and filmmaker Wayne Blair and Australian producers Darren Dale and Kylie du Fresne, were invited to join the Academy of Motion Picture Arts and Sciences.

== Notable films ==
- Blight's most successful film to date has been The Sapphires, which was in Official Selection at the 2012 Cannes Film Festival and released in the US by The Weinstein Company. The film earned more than $14 million at the local box office, sold more than 400,000 DVDs, and won multiple awards.
- The Eternity Man won the Rose d'Or (Golden Rose) in 2009.
- Clubland, starring Brenda Blethyn and directed by Cherie Nowlan, screened at the Sundance Film Festival and was released by Warner Independent Pictures in the US as Introducing the Dwights.
- The Tree, directed by Julie Bertuccelli and starring Charlotte Gainsbourg, was closing night film of the 2010 Cannes Film Festival, and received a standing ovation.

== Films ==
Her films include the following:

Film	Release date	Director	Cast
I Am Woman	2019	Unjoo Moon	Tilda Cobham-Hervey, Danielle Macdonald, Evan Peters
Top End Wedding	2019	Wayne Blair	Gwilym Lee, Kerry Fox and Miranda Tapsell
Holding the Man	2015	Neil Armfield	Sarah Snook, Guy Pearce, Anthony LaPaglia
Felony	2013	Matthew Saville	Joel Edgerton, Jai Courtney, Tom Wilkinson
The Sapphires	2012	Wayne Blair	Deborah Mailman, Jessica Mauboy, Chris O'Dowd
Panic at Rock Island (TV movie)	2011	Tony Tilse	Grant Bowler, Zoe Cramond, Eli Kent
The Tree	2011	Julie Bertuccelli	Charlotte Gainsbourg
Closed for Winter	2009	James Bogle	Natalie Imbruglia
Scorched	2008	Tony Tilse	Cameron Daddo, Rachael Carpani, Georgie Parker
The Eternity Man	2008	Julien Temple	Grant Doyle, Christa Hughes, Lara Mulcahy
Introducing the Dwights (aka) Clubland	2007	Cherie Nowlan	Khan Chittenden, Emma Booth, Richard Wilson
Stepfather of the Bride (TV movie)	2006	Roger Hodgman	Alex Dimitriades, Leon Ford, Lucy Taylor
Small Claims: The Reunion (TV movie)	2006	Tony Tilse	Claudia Karvan, Rebecca Gibney, Lisa Chappell
Small Claims: White Wedding (TV movie)	2005	Cherie Nowlan	Claudia Karvan, Rebecca Gibney, Lisa Chappell
Small Claims (TV movie)	2004	Cherie Nowlan	Claudia Karvan, Rebecca Gibney, Robert Mammone
Go Big	2004	Tony Tilse	Justine Clarke, Tom Long, Alex Dimitriades
Fresh Air	1999	Neil Mansfield	Marin Mimica, Nadine Garner, Bridie Carter
In the Winter Dark	1998	James Bogle	Brenda Blethyn, Ray Barrett, Richard Roxburgh
Mary	1994	Kay Pavlou	Lucy Bell

== See also ==
- Cinema of Australia
