= Goalpost Pictures =

Australian film company, founded 2008

Goalpost Pictures Pty Ltd
- Type: Private
- Industry: Films
- Predecessor: RB Films
- Founded: 7 February 2002; 24 years ago
- Founder: Rosemary Blight; Ben Grant; Kylie du Fresne; Cass O’Connor
- Headquarters: The Flourmill Studios, Newtown, New South Wales, Australia
- Key people: Rosemary Blight (CEO); Ben Grant (head of production); Kylie du Fresne (chairman); Cass O’Connor (executive director)
- Products: The Djarn Djarns; Clubland; The Eternity Man; Carmen; I Am Woman
- Website: Goalpost Pictures

Goalpost Pictures Pty Ltd. is an Australian film production company founded and run by Rosemary Blight, Ben Grant, Kylie du Fresne, and Cass O’Connor.

== History ==
Blight, Grant, du Fresne, and O'Connor founded the company in 2002. Their first noted production is The Djarn Djarns released in 2005.

The 2007 suburban comedy Clubland, directed by Cherie Nowlan, debuted at the 2009 Sundance Film Festival, and was picked up for US distribution by Warner Bros. under the title Introducing The Dwights.

In 2009, Goalpost produced The Eternity Man, a film opera depicting the true story of World War I veteran Arthur Stace, who roamed the backstreets of Sydney chalking the single word "Eternity" across the pavements. The film, which was released in conjunction with ABC TV and Channel 4 UK, earned the Rose d'Or award for outstanding performing arts program.

Other credits include Lockie Leonard Series One and Two, which were screened on Channel 9 and based on Tim Winton's book series. Lockie Leonard won 'Best Children's Series' at the 2009 TV Week Logie Awards as well as the 2007 AFI for 'Best Children's Drama Series'. It was also picked up in the UK by BBC 2. Further productions include Scorched, a television and cross-platform event that won the 2009 Digital Emmy Award, and James Bogle's Closed for Winter, starring Natalie Imbruglia.

Goalpost Pictures executive-produced the 2010 Australian-French film The Tree, adapted from the book Our Father Who Art In The Tree, by Australian author Judy Pascoe. Starring Charlotte Gainsbourg, the film was selected to be the closing night film at the 2010 Cannes Film Festival. In 2011 they produced Tony Tilse's event horror-thriller telemovie Panic At Rock Island for The Nine Network and NBC Universal.

Goalpost Pictures received the "Production Business of the Year" award in the 2013 Screen Producers Australia Awards.

== Governance ==
As of May 2022 Goalpost is led by founding members, producers Rosemary Blight, Ben Grant, Kylie du Fresne, and Cass O'Connor.

== Filmography ==
Film	Director	Year
The Djarn Djarns	Wayne Blair	2005
Clubland	Cherie Nowlan	2007
The Eternity Man	Julien Temple	2008
Ralph	Deborah Mailman	2009
Closed for Winter	James Bogle	2009
The Tree	Julie Bertuccelli	2011
The Sapphires	Wayne Blair	2012
Upgrade	Leigh Whannell	2018
I Am Woman	Unjoo Moon	2019
The Invisible Man	Leigh Whannell	2020
Carmen	Benjamin Millepied	2022

Television show	Director	Year
Small Claims	Cherie Nowlan	2003
Stepfather of the Bride	Roger Hodgeman	2005
Lockie Leonard (Series 1)	Julien Temple	2006
Scorched	Tony Tilse	2008
Lockie Leonard (Series 2)	various	2009
The Sellers	Maia Horniak	2011
Panic at Rock Island	Tony Tilse	2011

== Awards ==
Film	Award	Category	Result	Year
Lockie Leonard	AFI Awards	Best Children's Drama Series	Won	2007
Lockie Leonard	ATOM Awards	Best Children's Television Series	Won	2007
Lockie Leonard	Logie Awards	Outstanding Children's Series	Won	2009
Clubland	AWGIE Awards	Gold AWGIE	Won	2007
Clubland	AWGIE Awards	Best Screenplay	Won	2007
Clubland	St Tropez Film Festival	Audience Choice	Won	2007
Clubland	Valenciennes Film Festival	Jury Prize	Won	2008
Clubland	AFI Awards	Best Supporting Actress	Won	2008
The Eternity Man	ATOM Awards	Best Experimental Film	Nominated	2008
The Eternity Man	Rose d'Or	Best Performing Arts Program	Won	2009
Stepfather of the Bride	Chicago International Film Festival	Silver Plaque Hugo Award	Won	2007
Stepfather of the Bride	AFI Awards	Best Lead Actress in a Television Drama	Nominated	2007
Stepfather of the Bride	AGSC	Best original television score	Won	2007
