= The Eternity Man (film) =

- Written by: Dorothy Porter
- Screenplay by: Julien Temple
- Directed by: Julien Temple
- Starring: Grant Doyle; Christa Hughes
- Music by: Jonathan Mills
- Country of origin: Australia
- Original language: English

Production
- Producer: Rosemary Blight
- Editor: Rodrigo Balart

Original release
- Release: 2008

The Eternity Man is a 2008 tele-film adaptation of the opera The Eternity Man by composer Jonathan Mills and librettist Dorothy Porter.

The film follows the life of Arthur Stace. The film was a co-production of ABC Television and Channel 4, and won a Rose d'Or.
