= Small Claims (film) =

- Directed by: Cherie Nowlan
- Written by: Kaye Bendle; Keith Thompson
- Produced by: Rosemary Blight; Ben Grant; Sue Masters
- Starring: Claudia Karvan; Rebecca Gibney; Robert Mammone
- Cinematography: Anna Howard
- Edited by: Mark Perry
- Production company: Goalpost Pictures
- Distributed by: Network Ten
- Release date: 17 May 2004 (Australia)
- Country: Australia
- Language: English

Small Claims is an Australian television film starring Rebecca Gibney and Claudia Karvan, which first aired on Network Ten in 2004. The film was a co-production with subscription television and was also broadcast on the Foxtel, Austar, and Optus Television Subscription Television services. The series was written by husband and wife team, Keith Thompson and Kaye Bendle.

The film is part one of a mystery series about two overworked young mums, de-skilled beyond their worst nightmares, who become a formidable pair of sleuths, directed by Cherie Nowlan. Their cases are the murders, greed and dark passions that lurk behind the anonymous facade of the suburbs. Two sequels followed, entitled Small Claims: White Wedding and Small Claims: The Reunion.

== Cast ==
- Rebecca Gibney as Chrissy Hindmarsh
- Claudia Karvan as Jo Collins
- Robert Mammone as Todd Fehlers
- Paul Barry as Greg Collins
- Carol Burns as Pamela
- Gyton Grantley as Detective Senior Constable Brett
- Wayne Blair as Detective Senior Constable Lacey
- Rebecca Massey as Clare Santarini
- Simon Westaway as Detective Inspector Ray Vaughn
- Steven Vidler as Ross
- Tina Bursill as Rhonda

== See also ==
- Australian films of 2004
- Cinema of Australia
- List of films shot in Sydney
- List of Australian films
