= Small Claims: White Wedding =

- Directed by: Cherie Nowlan
- Written by: Kaye Bendle; Keith Thompson
- Produced by: Rosemary Blight; Ben Grant; Sue Masters
- Starring: Claudia Karvan; Rebecca Gibney; Alyssa McClelland
- Cinematography: Anna Howard
- Edited by: Mark Perry
- Production company: Goalpost Pictures
- Distributed by: Network Ten
- Release date: 14 August 2005 (Australia)
- Country: Australia
- Language: English

Small Claims: White Wedding is an Australian television film starring Rebecca Gibney and Claudia Karvan, which first aired on Network Ten in 2005. The film was a co-production with subscription television and was also broadcast on the Foxtel, Austar, and Optus Television Subscription Television services. The series was written by husband and wife team, Keith Thompson and Kaye Bendle.

The film is part two of a mystery series about two overworked young mums, de-skilled beyond their worst nightmares, who become a formidable pair of sleuths, directed by Cherie Nowlan. Their cases are the murders, greed and dark passions that lurk behind the anonymous facade of the suburbs.

== Cast ==
- Rebecca Gibney as Chrissy Hindmarsh
- Claudia Karvan as Jo Collins
- Alyssa McClelland as Kiara Duffy
- Deborah Kennedy as Trudy Duffy
- Paul Barry as Greg Collins
- Carol Burns as Pamela
- Gyton Grantley as Detective Senior Constable Brett
- Wayne Blair as Detective Senior Constable Lacey
- Roy Billing as Ron Duffy
- Brooke Satchwell as Imogen
- Michael Dorman as Sean
- Victoria Thaine as Tori
- Rupert Reid as David
- Firass Dirani as Pizza Delivery Boy
- Kate Box as Nicole

== See also ==
- Australian films of 2004
- Cinema of Australia
- List of films shot in Sydney
- List of Australian films
