= Small Claims: The Reunion =

- Directed by: Tony Tilse
- Written by: Kaye Bendle; Keith Thompson
- Produced by: Rosemary Blight; Ben Grant; Sue Masters
- Starring: Claudia Karvan; Rebecca Gibney; Lisa Chappell
- Cinematography: Anna Howard
- Edited by: Mark Perry
- Production company: Goalpost Pictures
- Distributed by: Network Ten
- Release date: 16 April 2006 (Australia)
- Country: Australia
- Language: English

Small Claims: The Reunion is an Australian television film starring Rebecca Gibney and Claudia Karvan, which first aired on Network Ten in 2006. The film was a co-production with subscription television and was also broadcast on the Foxtel, Austar, and Optus Television Subscription Television services. The series was written by husband and wife team, Keith Thompson and Kaye Bendle.

The film is part three of a mystery series about two overworked young mums, de-skilled beyond their worst nightmares, who become a formidable pair of sleuths, directed by Cherie Nowlan. Their cases are the murders, greed and dark passions that lurk behind the anonymous facade of the suburbs.

== Cast ==
- Rebecca Gibney as Chrissy Hindmarsh
- Claudia Karvan as Jo Collins
- Lisa Chappell as Louise Page
- Simon Burke as Jon
- Alison Whyte as Pip
- Maggie Dence as Roma
- Peter Phelps as Paul Loyd
- Emma Booth as Annie
- Steve Vidler as Ross Page
- Daisy Betts as Amber
- Gyton Grantley as Detective Senior Constable Brett
- Wayne Blair as Detective Senior Constable Lacey
- Michael Denkha as Vet
- David Roberts as Peter Hindmarsh
- Billie Rose Prichard as Judi

== See also ==
- Australian films of 2004
- Cinema of Australia
- List of films shot in Sydney
- List of Australian films
