= Forever Lulu =

Forever Lulu is the title of some movies. It could refer to:

- Forever, Lulu (1987 film)
- Forever Lulu (2000 film), by director John Kaye, with Melanie Griffith, Patrick Swayze, Penelope Ann Miller
