= Dion Beebe =

Australian–South African cinematographer

- Born: May 18, 1968; Brisbane, Queensland, Australia
- Years active: 1989–present
- Spouse: Unjoo Moon

Dion Beebe A.C.S. A.S.C. (/ˈdiːɒn ˈbiːbi/ DEE-on BEE-bee; born 18 May 1968) is an Australian–South African cinematographer.

He won the Academy Award for Best Cinematography for Memoirs of a Geisha (2005).

== Early life and education ==
Originally from Brisbane, Queensland, Australia, his family moved to Cape Town, South Africa, in 1972.

Beebe studied cinematography at the Australian Film, Television and Radio School from 1987 to 1989, where he met his future wife Unjoo Moon.

== Career ==
Beebe has a working collaboration with director Rob Marshall, receiving a nomination for the Academy Award for Best Cinematography for Chicago (2002), while winning the award for Memoirs of a Geisha (2005).

Known for the use of stylized, highly saturated colour palettes, as well as experimental uses of digital video, Beebe won the BAFTA Award for Best Cinematography for Michael Mann's film Collateral (2004), which he shares the credit with Paul Cameron.

Beebe is a member of the Australian Cinematographers Society (ACS) and the American Society of Cinematographers (ASC). He was inducted into the ACS' Hall of Fame at the National Awards in 2020. He is also a Governor of the Academy of Motion Picture Arts and Sciences' Board of Governors.

== Filmography ==
Feature film

Year	Title	Director	Notes
1992	Crush	Alison Maclean	
1995	Vacant Possession	Margot Nash	
1996	What I Have Written	John Hughes	
1996	Floating Life	Clara Law	
1998	Memory & Desire	Niki Caro	
1998	Praise	John Curran	
1999	Holy Smoke!	Jane Campion	Also camera operator
2000	Forever Lulu	John Kaye	
2000	The Goddess of 1967	Clara Law	
2001	Charlotte Gray	Gillian Armstrong	
2002	Chicago	Rob Marshall	1st collaboration with Marshall
2002	Equilibrium	Kurt Wimmer	
2003	In the Cut	Jane Campion	
2004	Collateral	Michael Mann	With Paul Cameron
2005	Memoirs of a Geisha	Rob Marshall	
2006	Miami Vice	Michael Mann	
2007	Rendition	Gavin Hood	
2009	Land of the Lost	Brad Silberling	
2009	Nine	Rob Marshall	
2011	Green Lantern	Martin Campbell	
2013	Gangster Squad	Ruben Fleischer	
2014	Edge of Tomorrow	Doug Liman	
2014	Into the Woods	Rob Marshall	
2016	13 Hours: The Secret Soldiers of Benghazi	Michael Bay	
2017	The Snowman	Tomas Alfredson	
2018	Mary Poppins Returns	Rob Marshall	
2019	I Am Woman	Unjoo Moon	
2019	Gemini Man	Ang Lee	
2023	The Little Mermaid	Rob Marshall	
2026	Michael	Antoine Fuqua	

Documentary film

Year	Title	Director
1993	The Journey	Christopher Tuckfield
1994	Eternity	Lawrence Johnston
2012	The Zen of Bennett	Unjoo Moon

Television

Year	Title	Director	Notes
1998	My Own Country	Mira Nair	TV movie
1999	Century of Cinema	George Miller	Segment 40,000 Years of Dreaming
2006	Tony Bennett: An American Classic	Rob Marshall	TV special

== Awards and nominations ==
Year	Award	Category	Title	Result	Ref.
2002	Academy Awards	Best Cinematography	Chicago	Nominated	
2005	Academy Awards	Best Cinematography	Memoirs of a Geisha	Won	
2002	BAFTA Awards	Best Cinematography	Chicago	Nominated	
2004	BAFTA Awards	Best Cinematography	Collateral	Won •	
2005	BAFTA Awards	Best Cinematography	Memoirs of a Geisha	Won	
2004	American Society of Cinematographers	Outstanding Cinematography	Collateral	Nominated •	
2005	American Society of Cinematographers	Outstanding Cinematography	Memoirs of a Geisha	Won	
2009	American Society of Cinematographers	Outstanding Cinematography	Nine	Nominated	
2005	Satellite Awards	Best Cinematography	Memoirs of a Geisha	Nominated	
2009	Satellite Awards	Best Cinematography	Nine	Won	
2005	St. Louis Gateway Film Critics Association	Best Cinematography	Memoirs of a Geisha	Nominated	
2009	St. Louis Gateway Film Critics Association	Best Cinematography	Nine	Won	

Other awards

Year	Award	Category	Title	Result
2004	Los Angeles Film Critics Association Awards	Best Cinematography	Collateral	Won •
2004	National Society of Film Critics Awards	Best Cinematography	Collateral	Nominated •
2004	Online Film Critics Society Awards	Best Cinematography	Collateral	Nominated •
2009	Critics' Choice Movie Awards	Best Cinematography	Nine	Nominated
2009	Houston Film Critics Society Awards	Best Cinematography	Nine	Nominated

Key
•	Shared award/nomination with Paul Cameron
