= Where the Buffalo Roam =

1980 film about Hunter S. Thompson

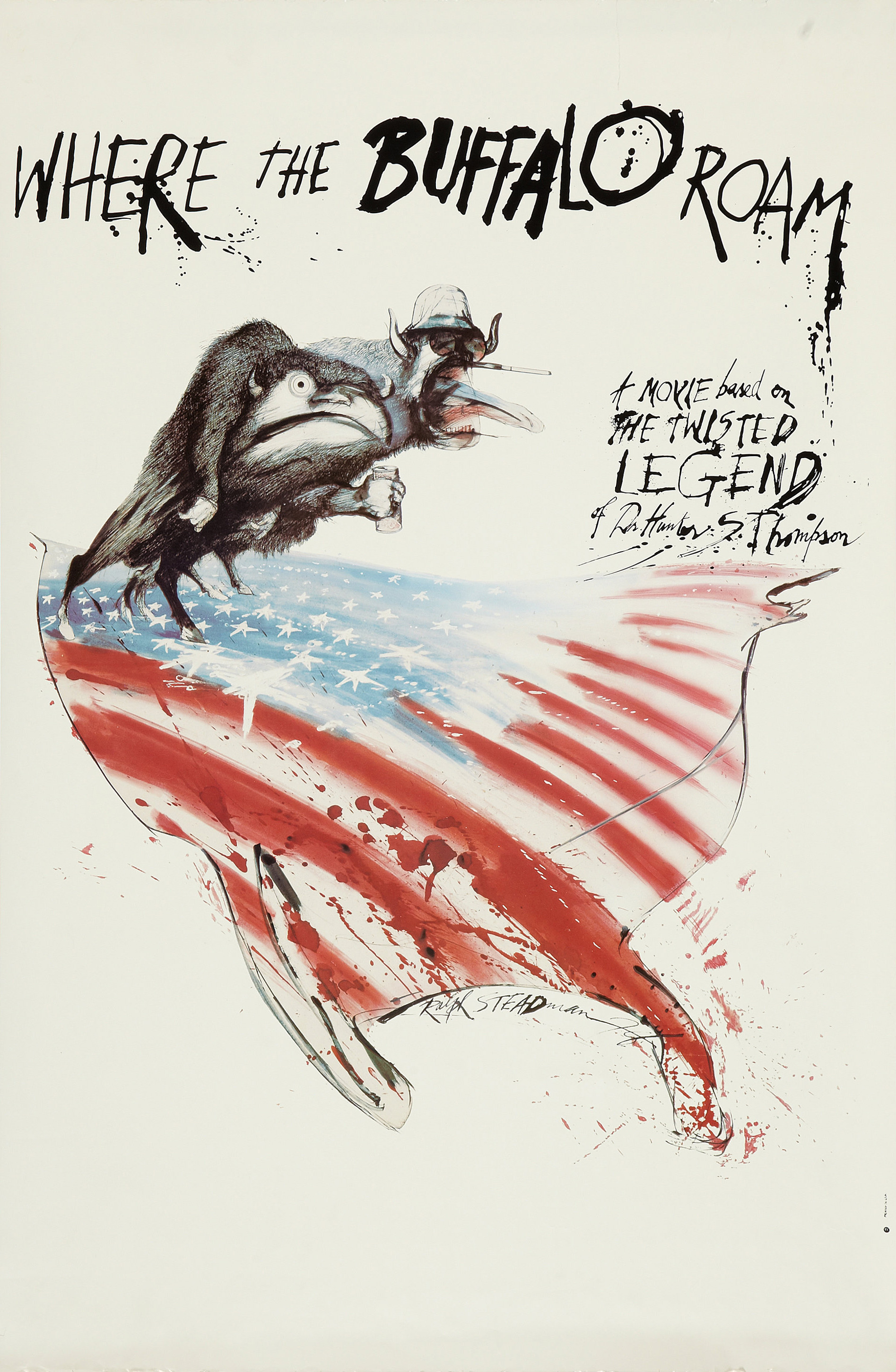
- Theatrical release poster by Ralph Steadman
- Directed by: Art Linson
- Screenplay by: John Kaye
- Based on: "The Banshee Screams for Buffalo Meat" and "Strange Rumblings in Aztlan" by Hunter S. Thompson
- Produced by: Art Linson
- Starring: Bill Murray; Peter Boyle; Bruno Kirby; René Auberjonois
- Cinematography: Tak Fujimoto
- Edited by: Christopher Greenbury
- Music by: Neil Young
- Distributed by: Universal Pictures
- Release date: April 25, 1980
- Running time: 99 minutes
- Country: United States
- Language: English
- Budget: $4 million
- Box office: $6,659,377

Where the Buffalo Roam is a 1980 American semi-biographical comedy film which loosely depicts author Hunter S. Thompson's rise to fame in the 1970s and his relationship with Chicano attorney and activist Oscar "Zeta" Acosta. The film was produced and directed by Art Linson. Bill Murray portrayed Thompson and Peter Boyle portrayed Acosta, who is referred to in the film as Carl Lazlo, Esq. A number of other names, places, and details of Thompson's life are also changed.

Thompson's eulogy for Acosta ("The Banshee Screams for Buffalo Meat", published in the December 1977 issue of Rolling Stone) served as the nominal basis of the film, although screenwriter John Kaye drew from several other works, including Fear and Loathing on the Campaign Trail '72 and various pieces included in The Great Shark Hunt and Fear and Loathing in Las Vegas. Thompson was credited as an executive consultant on the film.

== Plot ==
The film opens in the Rocky Mountains on the Colorado ranch of Dr. Hunter S. Thompson, a journalist furiously trying to finish a story about his former attorney and friend, Carl Lazlo, Esq. Thompson then flashes back to a series of exploits involving the author and his attorney.

In 1968, Thompson leaves the hospital; later, Lazlo fights to stop a group of San Francisco youngsters from receiving harsh prison sentences for possession of marijuana. He convinces Thompson to write an article about it for Blast Magazine. Thompson's editor, Marty Lewis, reminds Thompson that he has 19 hours to deadline. The judge hands out stiff sentences to everyone; the last client is a young man who was caught with 1 pound of marijuana and receives a five-year sentence. Lazlo reacts by attacking the prosecuting attorney and is then jailed for contempt of court.

The magazine story about the trial is a sensation, but Thompson does not hear from Lazlo until four years later, when Thompson is on assignment covering Super Bowl VI in Los Angeles. Lazlo appears at Thompson's hotel and convinces him to abandon the Super Bowl story and join his band of freedom fighters, which involves smuggling weapons to an unnamed Latin American country. Thompson goes along with Lazlo and the revolutionaries to a remote airstrip where a small airplane is to be loaded with weapons, but when a police helicopter finds them, Lazlo and his henchmen escape on the plane while Thompson refuses to follow.

Thompson's fame and fortune continue. He is a hit on the college lecture circuit and covers the 1972 presidential election campaign. After being thrown off the journalist plane by The Candidate's press secretary, Thompson takes the crew plane and gives strait-laced journalist Harris from the Post a strong hallucinogenic drug and steals his clothes and press credentials. At the next campaign stop, in the airport bathroom, Thompson uses his disguise to engage The Candidate in a conversation about the "Screwheads" and the "Doomed".

Thompson, still posing as Harris, returns to the journalist plane. Lazlo then appears, striding across the airport tarmac in a white suit. He boards the plane and tries to convince his old friend to join his socialist paradise somewhere in the desert. After causing a disturbance, Thompson and Lazlo are thrown off the plane, and Lazlo's papers that describe the community are blown across the airport runway. Lazlo, presumably, is not heard from again.

The action then returns to Thompson's cabin, just as the writer puts the finishing touches on his story, explaining that he didn't go along with Lazlo—or Nixon—because "it still hasn't gotten weird enough for me."

== Cast ==
- Bill Murray as Hunter S. Thompson
- Peter Boyle as Carl Lazlo, Esq.
- Bruno Kirby as Marty Lewis
- René Auberjonois as Harris from The Washington Post
- R.G. Armstrong as Judge Simpson
- Mark Metcalf as Dooley
- Craig T. Nelson as Cop on Stand
- Brian Cummings as Richard Nixon (voice)
- Sunny Johnson as Student Nurse

== Production ==
In the late 1970s, film producer Thom Mount paid $100,000 for the film rights to the obituary of Chicano activist Oscar Zeta Acosta, "The Banshee Screams for Buffalo Meat", written by Hunter S. Thompson. Thompson agreed to have it optioned without seeing a screenplay figuring that the film would never get made, as the vastly more popular Fear and Loathing in Las Vegas had been optioned several times and was never made. In 1978, Art Linson, who had previously produced four films, started planning to make the film, which would be his directorial debut. Thompson remembered, "Then all of a sudden there was some moment of terrible horror when I realized they were going to make the movie". Linson asked illustrator Ralph Steadman to create a poster for the film in the style of the illustrations he had done for Thompson's articles. He used a drawing titled Spirit of Gonzo as the basis.

Thompson met with the film's screenwriter John Kaye and felt that Kaye understood more than what was in the script, which he described as "bad, dumb, low-level, low rent". Thompson admitted that he signed away having any kind of control so that he could not be blamed for the result. In the original script, Lazlo's surname was Mendoza but this was changed after Nosotros, a group of Chicano actors and filmmakers, threatened to create controversy if the character was played by Anglo actor Peter Boyle. Just before principal photography was to begin, Bill Murray became apprehensive about the project because of the shortcomings of the script.

Before principal photography began, Linson took a four-month crash course in directing. Thompson was eventually brought aboard the film's production as "executive consultant", but claimed he had no substantial role other than to have "wandered around and fired machine guns on the set". Kaye has claimed that Thompson and Murray changed parts of the script during filming and, at that point, he chose to no longer be involved in the production. Steadman observed Linson on the set and said that it was "pretty obvious that he was in no frame of mind to catch the abandoned pure essence of gonzo madness, which can only happen in uncontrolled conditions". He also felt that Linson's "fanaticism for the subject he was trying to portray was undoubtedly there, and his sincerity, too", but felt that he was under the impression that the film was a runaway hit before he had even begun filming it and therefore refused to take any chances with the material. Steadman and Thompson spent time on the set and the former talked to Murray about his impressions and observations of the latter's mannerisms. Within two weeks of Thompson being on set, Murray had transformed into him.

During production, Murray and Thompson engaged in a series of dangerous one-upmanship contests. "One day at Thompson's Aspen, Colorado home, after many drinks and after much arguing over who could out-Houdini whom, Thompson tied Billy to a chair and threw him into the swimming pool. Billy nearly drowned before Thompson pulled him out." Murray immersed himself in the character so deeply that when Saturday Night Live started its fifth season, Murray was still in character as Thompson. "In a classic case of the role overtaking the actor, Billy returned that fall to Saturday Night so immersed in playing Hunter Thompson he had virtually become Hunter Thompson, complete with long black cigarette holder, dark glasses, and nasty habits. 'Billy,' said one of the writers, echoing several others, 'was not Bill Murray, he was Hunter Thompson. You couldn't talk to him without talking to Hunter Thompson.'"

Murray and Thompson were concerned with the film's lack of continuity and in early 1980 added voice-over narration. When the film was sneak-previewed in late March, the last two scenes and narration were absent. Murray was outraged and the studio ended up shooting a new ending. Three days before it was to be released in theaters a press screening was suddenly canceled because of editing problems.

The film shows Thompson in Los Angeles covering 1972's Super Bowl VI between the Miami Dolphins and the Dallas Cowboys. That game was actually played at Tulane Stadium in New Orleans. (The next year's Super Bowl was played in Los Angeles, between the Dolphins and the Washington Redskins.)

== Reception ==
The film opened on April 25, 1980, in 464 theaters, earning $1,750,593 in its opening weekend and more than $6.6 million for a total lifetime gross.

It has been panned critically for being a series of bizarre episodes strung together rather than having a cohesive central plot. Movie historian Leonard Maltin remarked that "Even Neil Young's music score can't save this dreadful comedy, which will baffle those who aren't familiar with Hunter S. Thompson's work and insult those who are." Film critic Roger Ebert gave Where the Buffalo Roam two stars out of four and said that "The movie fails to deal convincingly with either Thompson's addictions or with his friendship with Lazlo". However, Ebert also noted that "this is the kind of bad movie that's almost worth seeing". Gene Siskel awarded two-and-a-half stars out of four and declared that "Murray is fine at playing an angry clown, but Where the Buffalo Roam should have given us much more than that. There's nothing in the film that would make anyone want to read Hunter Thompson's words. And that's a critical failure for a movie about a writer." In his review for The Washington Post, Gary Arnold wrote: "Well, the actors haven't transcended their material. They're simply stuck with it. Murray and Boyle don't emerge as a swell comic team, and they aren't funny as individuals either." Jack Kroll wrote, in his review for Newsweek magazine: "Screenwriter John Kaye has reduced Thompson's career to a rubble of disjointed episodes, and the relentless mayhem becomes tiresome chaos rather than liberating comic anarchy." In his review for The Globe and Mail, Paul McGrath wrote: "Murray is, nonetheless, the salvation of this patched-together film", and felt that "the rest is mostly filler. The story is so badly put together in the first place - and from there, badly scripted - that the movie makes almost no impact outside the infrequent hilarity". Roger Angell of The New Yorker wrote, "The most surprising thing ... is how much of Thompson's tone gets into the picture".

The film review aggregation website Rotten Tomatoes lists the film as "rotten" with a 19% favorable rating among critics based on 26 reviews. The consensus summarizes: "Bill Murray delivers a noteworthy portrayal of Hunter S. Thompson, but Where the Buffalo Roam strains to get through its rambling narrative."

Universal Studios quickly pulled it from distribution. Thompson hated the film, saying he liked Murray's performance but that he "was very disappointed in the script. It sucks – a bad, dumb, low-level, low-rent script." Years later, Murray reflected on the film: "I rented a house in L.A. with a guest house that Hunter lived in. I'd work all day and stay up all night with him; I was strong in those days. I took on another persona and that was tough to shake. I still have Hunter in me".

== Soundtrack ==
Where the Buffalo Roam

Soundtrack album by various artists
- Released: April 25, 1980
- Genres: Rock; R&B
- Length: 38:00
- Labels: Backstreet; MCA
- Producer: David Briggs

Professional ratings
Review scores
Source	Rating
Allmusic	link

The film was scored by Neil Young, who sings the opening theme, "Home on the Range" (from which the film derives its title), accompanied by a harmonica. Variations on "Home on the Range" are played by Young on electric guitar as "Ode to Wild Bill" and by an orchestra with arrangements by David Blumberg on "Buffalo Stomp". Music in the film included rock and R&B songs by Jimi Hendrix, Bob Dylan, The Temptations, the Four Tops and Creedence Clearwater Revival. Additionally, characters played by Bill Murray and René Auberjonois sing lyrics from "Lucy in the Sky with Diamonds".

Because of the high cost of music licensing, most VHS and all DVD releases retained only the Neil Young score and the Creedence song "Keep on Chooglin'", with the rest of the music replaced by generic approximations of the original songs. The choice of songs for the DVD version was somewhat anachronistic, featuring 1980s-style songs in a 1960s and 1970s setting.

In 2017, Shout! Factory released a Blu-ray edition restoring the original songs, making this the first home media version since the original VHS release to feature a completely unaltered soundtrack.

The soundtrack album was released by Backstreet Records in 1980 as a vinyl LP and included pieces of dialogue from the film. It has not been re-issued on CD.

No.	Title	Performed by	Length
1.	"Buffalo Stomp"	Neil Young with the Wild Bill Band of Strings	3:10
2.	"Ode to Wild Bill #1"	Neil Young	0:48
3.	"All Along the Watchtower"	The Jimi Hendrix Experience	3:58
4.	"Lucy in the Sky with Diamonds"	Bill Murray	1:24
5.	"Ode to Wild Bill #2"	Neil Young	1:01
6.	"Papa Was a Rollin' Stone"	The Temptations	6:59
7.	"Home, Home on the Range"	Neil Young	1:44
8.	"Straight Answers" (dialogue)	Bill Murray	0:21
9.	"Highway 61 Revisited"	Bob Dylan	3:21
10.	"I Can't Help Myself (Sugar Pie Honey Bunch)"	Four Tops	2:43
11.	"Ode to Wild Bill #3"	Neil Young	0:40
12.	"Keep on Chooglin'"	Creedence Clearwater Revival	7:39
13.	"Ode to Wild Bill #4"	Neil Young	0:32
14.	"Purple Haze"	The Jimi Hendrix Experience	2:47
15.	"Buffalo Stomp Refrain"	Neil Young with the Wild Bill Band of Strings	0:53
Total length:			38:00

== See also ==
- List of American films of 1980
- Fear and Loathing in Las Vegas (film)
- The Rum Diary (film)
