= Frank Mills (surgeon) =

Australian surgeon (1910–2008)

Frank Mills AO FRACS FRCS
- Born: 10 June 1910; Armidale, New South Wales, Australia
- Died: 6 April 2008 (aged 97); Sydney, Australia
- Education: University of Sydney
- Occupation: Surgeon
- Spouse: Elayne Smith (m. 1960)
- Relatives: Jonathan Mills (son)

Frank Harland Mills AO (20 June 1910 – 6 April 2008) was an Australian surgeon who specialised in thyroid surgery and cardiac surgery. He was also known for his work as a military physician as a Japanese prisoner-of-war (POW) during World War II.

== Early life ==
Mills was born on 20 June 1910 in Armidale, New South Wales. He was one of four children born to Florence (née Brown) and Percy Mills; his father was a local magistrate.

Mills' mother died when was six years old and he was raised by his father in Moruya; one of his older sisters was killed in a car crash when he was a child. He attended Wollongong High School and went on to the University of Sydney, graduating MBBS in 1933. He completed his residency at Royal Prince Alfred Hospital (RPAH), also assisting Frank Rundle with his research on thyroid disease.

== Career ==
=== Early work ===
Mills was appointed medical superintendent of Marrickville Hospital in 1937. He subsequently completed further training in England on a Walter and Eliza Hall scholarship and was admitted to Fellowship of the Royal College of Surgeons in 1938. After returning to Australia he worked as an assistant surgeon at RPAH and St Vincent's Hospital, Sydney.

=== Military service ===
In 1940, Mills enlisted in the Australian Imperial Force. He was appointed as a captain in the 2/10th Australian General Hospital and dispatched to Singapore with the 8th Division. He established a small field hospital in the early days of the Malayan campaign and after the fall of Singapore became a Japanese prisoner of war.

After a period at Changi Prison, Mills was moved to the Sandakan POW Camp on Borneo. In October 1943, he and other officers were moved to the Kuching POW camp, despite his attempts to remain at Sandakan. He ministered to his fellow prisoners using improvised methods, such as treating peptic ulcers using solutions of ash, and "performed surgery under the most difficult conditions, using sterilised razor blades, sewing the incisions with sterilised thread taken from his shirt".

=== Return to Australia ===
After the war's end Mills was admitted to Fellowship of the Royal Australasian College of Surgeons in 1947 and began working as an assistant to Hugh Poate at RPAH. He remained interest in thyroid surgery and in the late 1940s began performing heart surgery, following a Carnegie grant to study techniques overseas. He subsequent became a pioneer of surgical training in Australia.

Mills performed the first successful surgery to treat blue baby syndrome at RPAH. In 1952, he performed a surgical widening of the tricuspid valve and in 1955 he repaired an atrial septal defect in "what is thought to be the first open-heart surgery done in Australia". He also performed surgeries for coarctation of the aorta, patent ductus arteriosus, and mitral stenosis.

== Personal life ==
In 1960, Mills married Elayne Smith, with whom he had two children, including composer Jonathan Mills. Outside medicine he was a part-owner of a vineyard in the Hunter Valley and was chairman of the pastoral company operating Wollogorang Station.

Mills died in Sydney on 2 April 2008, aged 97.
