= Wild Surmise =

Book by Dorothy Porter

- Author: Dorothy Porter
- Language: English
- Publisher: Picador, Australia
- Publication date: 2002
- Publication place: Australia
- Media type: Print (Paperback)
- Pages: 293
- ISBN: 0330363808
- Preceded by: What a Piece of Work
- Followed by: El Dorado

Wild Surmise is a 2002 verse novel by Australian poet Dorothy Porter which was shortlisted for the 2003 Miles Franklin Award.

== Notes ==
- Dedication: For Andy
- Epigraph: 'There felt I like some watcher of the skies, When a new planet swims into his ken; or like stout Cortez when with eagle eyes, he stared at the Pacific - and all his men look'd at each other with a wild surmise -' - 'On First Looking into Chapman's Homer.' John Keats
- Epigraph: 'Behold now, standing before you, the man who has pierced the air and penetrated the sky, wended his way amongst the stars and overpassed the margins of the world. - 'La Cena de le Ceneri.' Giordano Bruni (1548-1600).

== Adaptation ==
This novel was adapted for the stage by Jane Montgomery Griffiths and directed by Marion Potts. Performances of the play were held at the Malthouse Theatre, in Melbourne, in November and December 2012.

== Reviews ==
- The Sydney Morning Herald

== Awards and nominations ==
- 2003 shortlisted Miles Franklin Literary Award
- 2004 winner Adelaide Festival Awards for Literature (SA) — John Bray Award for Poetry
- 2004 winner Adelaide Festival Awards for Literature (SA) — Premier's Award for the Best Overall Published Work
