= Underbelly: The Golden Mile =

- No. of episodes: 13

Release
- Original network: Nine Network
- Original release: 11 April – 27 June 2010

Series chronology
- ← Previous; A Tale of Two Cities Next → Razor

Underbelly: The Golden Mile, the third series of Nine Network's crime drama series Underbelly, originally aired from 11 April to 27 June 2010. It is a thirteen-part series loosely based on real events that stemmed from the mile-long nightclub/red light district in the Sydney suburb of Kings Cross, also known as the "Golden Mile", between 1988 and 1999. It primarily depicts the organized crimes in Kings Cross and the police corruption leading up to the 1995 Wood Royal Commission.

It is a prequel to Underbelly, which was about the Melbourne gangland killings, and a sequel to Underbelly: A Tale of Two Cities. Among the characters presented are John Ibrahim, Kim Hollingsworth, George Freeman, Lenny McPherson and MP John Hatton. Some of the characters, particularly those of the NSW Police, reprise their roles from A Tale of Two Cities.

The series premiered on the Nine Network on 11 April 2010 at 8.30 pm, with the double episode premiere attracting an average of 2.23 million viewers nationally, in the mainland capitals. The series premiered on TV3 in New Zealand on 5 May 2010.

== Synopsis ==
The series begins in 1988, a year after the events of the previous series. An intelligent but rebellious Lebanese high school boy named John Ibrahim joins his friends in Kings Cross with plans and dreams of making a fortune. Throughout the series the plot shows how John began his entrepreneurship by working for underworld figures like George Freeman and Lenny McPherson, who at the time were the ultimate kings of the Cross. The series also shows the corruption within NSW Police ranks stationed in Kings Cross, particularly Trevor Haken, Jim Egan and Dennis Kelly, who reprise their roles from Season 2 and Graham "Chook" Fowler, Eddie "Parrot" Gould and Neville "Scully" Scullion.

George Freeman dies from an asthma attack, leaving the Cross up for grabs by anyone with power on the street. A young woman named Kim Hollingsworth appears and the series explains Kim's story from being an ordinary working girl to a high-end stripper/prostitute. In the center of the series, social justice crusader and NSW MP John Hatton initiates the Wood Royal Commission to investigate corrupt police officers. Police detective Trevor Haken becomes an informant during the Commission, helping the government expose corrupt officers in Kings Cross, while his family life is torn apart.

The other detectives are caught and Jim Egan commits suicide. In Kings Cross, John Ibrahim has become a notable businessman after acquisition of most entertainment complexes in the area and being acquitted of a manslaughter charge. The dominance of traditional players in the Cross like Bill and Louis is now under threat from the arrival of a stable of new characters, including drug dealer Benny Kassab and his violent and impulsive enforcer Danny "DK" Karam.

Kim Hollingsworth decides to apply for the police academy after growing sick of her life as a sex worker. She is approached by the Royal Commission task force and becomes an undercover agent but her application for the police workforce is rejected after her previous employment history is revealed, and the Royal Commission abandons her after it has used her. She decides to sue the NSW Police and wins the lawsuit, though she never receives any compensation. Near the end of the series, Dennis Kelly applies to become Police Commissioner, but is forced to withdraw after his corrupt past is exposed.

Since the Royal Commission, the Golden Mile has plunged into chaos and violence with turf wars breaking out. A special task force called Strike Force Lancer is set up to investigate organized crimes in Kings Cross. After Kassab's arrest, Danny Karam has formed a gang called "DK's Boys" in attempt to take over the Cross, but his gang members, led by the loose cannon Michael Kanaan, plot his murder and attempt to take control. Their violence escalates with kneecappings of rivals to an eventual shooting of civilians.

Task Force Lance eventually pins down Kanaan and arrests his gang. The series ends, showing that Kim is living a quiet life in rural New South Wales, while peace has been restored to Kings Cross. The police and bikies said to John that they will always watch his back, making him remain as the undisputed king of the Cross.

== Episodes ==
No. overall	No. in series	Title	Directed by	Written by	Original release date
27	1	"Into the Mystic"	Tony Tilse	Felicity Packard	11 April 2010
In 1988, a young, skinny boy named John Ibrahim from the outer-suburbs arrives in King's Cross to seek his fortune after being expelled from school, which results in a chance meeting with Sydney crime bosses George Freeman and Lenny McPherson. Impressed by Ibrahim, Freeman offers him a job as a bouncer. The Kings Cross detectives get into a confrontation with some thugs and illegally rough them up after one makes a pass at Trevor's wife, to the horror of Constable Joe Dooley. When John notices a brawl on the cross, he jumps in and is almost fatally stabbed.
28	2	"The Crucible"	Tony Tilse	Felicity Packard	11 April 2010
Young waitress Kim Hollingsworth turns to prostitution after she discovers her abusive, cheating boyfriend Trent has stolen money from her. Corrupt King's Cross detectives Trevor Haken and Jim Egan go too far when arresting a pack of drunks, sparking political calls for a royal commission into the NSW Police. However, Haken and Egan, along with drug dealer Bill Bayeh, set up an elaborate "sting" for their own profit, resulting in them swindling $200,000 from the Australian Federal Police. John asks George to save his pay for him and is eventually able to buy into one of the Darlinghurst Road nightclubs where he works.
29	3	"Kingdom Come"	Tony Tilse	Greg Haddrick	18 April 2010
After a shooting in a cafe, Trevor strikes a deal with Bill Bayeh to control police raids and competition in King's Cross – Bayeh gets the "Green light" from Trevor to sell drugs, providing he does not sell to minors and there are no more drug-related shootings in the Cross. Narrowly escaping a shooting in Bayeh's gaming room, John receives some advice from George Freeman and is assigned a bodyguard. Trent pushes Kim's anger too far and sets put for revenge. She tries to leave the escort service to join the police after helping them arrest Trent for harassing her, but is rejected because she did not finish school. Corrupt police inspector Dennis Kelly tries to get a politician's daughter off drink-driving charges. This impresses the politician in question, Ken Wallis, who has a say in the race for Police Commissioner. George Freeman dies of an asthma attack.
30	4	"Fall Guy"	Tony Tilse	Kris Mrksa	25 April 2010
Benny Kassab, a nightclub bouncer, quells a street brawl and earns the attention of Bill Bayeh. Soon, Kassab becomes Bayeh's "fall guy", holding the money and drugs from Bill's deals. Not content with his position, Kassab begins distributing drugs secretly. When Bill's business suffers as a result, tensions rise between Bill and his brother, Louis Bayeh. After Louis threatens two of Kassab's associates, his house is sprayed with automatic fire. Trevor's alcoholism and paranoia take a personal toll when he accuses his wife, Maria, of having an affair with King's Cross detective Neville "Scully" Scullion. When he finds out it isn't true, Maria asks to be driven to her mother's house, but she never makes it. Kim meets Sergeant Dave and is persuaded, along with her sister and best friend, to strip for a police charity. However, after the show, they discover their money is missing.
31	5	"Saving Face"	Shawn Seet	Kris Mrksa	9 May 2010
Benny Kassab turns to Jim Egan and Trevor Haken for assistance in light of his two lieutenants, Shaka and Norm, shooting at Louis Bayeh's house. Egan and Haken organise a deal with Kassab that if Shaka and Norm turn themselves in at the Bankstown Police Station, they will get off lightly. However, Louis Bayeh uses his own police contacts to successfully oppose bail for the duo, causing Kassab to look like a liar. When Detective Debbie Webb is sent to investigate a break-and-enter with corrupt detective Eddie Gould, she is tricked into participating in an insurance scam run by Eddie and his brother. When Debbie discovers that Eddie participated in the gang-rape of another officer, she is outraged and she reports the incident to the Deputy Commissioner, only to be labelled a "whistleblower". John Ibrahim leases the "Illusion" nightclub to Hammer in order to prevent Hammer's ex-con associates from drinking at the Tunnel club and ruining business. Kim discovers that Sergeant Dave, her "boyfriend", is married, and tricks him in revenge by agreeing to participate in another sex show... that she has no intention of delivering.
32	6	"Women in Uniform"	Shawn Seet	Peter Gawler	9 May 2010
New King's Cross beat constable, Wendy Jones, quickly crosses paths with John Ibrahim and the attraction is mutual. However, after going on a scuba trip with Ibrahim, Wendy starts to have second thoughts about the prudence of their relationship. Fuming that her career is going nowhere, Detective Debbie Webb takes up drinking, but she strikes up a relationship with Kim Hollingsworth. Chief Inspector Dennis Kelly applies to enter the National Crime Authority in order to improve his resume in the race for police commissioner, but his actions attract the suspicions of the AFP's Gerry Lloyd. Debbie transfers to the fraud squad and meets Greg Locke.
33	7	"Full Force Gale"	Shawn Seet	Peter Gawler	16 May 2010
When gang violence breaks out in King's Cross, John Ibrahim is placed under pressure to clean up the drug mess on the streets. Things take a nasty turn his associate Russell Townsend accidentally kills drug dealer Talal Assad in John's presence. Because of the urgings of his friend, Constable Wendy Jones, to co-operate with the investigation, John is faced with the unenviable choice of "dobbing in" Townsend and losing the respect of Sydney's criminal underworld, or running the risk of everything he has built falling apart. Kim is thrilled with her loving, gentle new boyfriend, Michael, but decides to put his loyalty to the test by allowing her fellow prostitute & sister to proposition him. When Michael inevitably accepts the indecent proposal, Kim is furious and dumps him. Debbie Webb joins the fraud squad, but is snubbed due to her whistleblower reputation. However, she finds romance with her colleague Greg Locke. Debbie documents the corruption within the fraud squad and somehow gets a disinterested Dennis Kelly to sign it. However, Kelly manoeuvres out of a tight spot by reporting Debbie's complaint to Internal Affairs. Debbie discovers she is pregnant to Greg and the two wed, but not before she learns to let go of her past and embrace the fact that she is a good person.
34	8	"Crossroads"	Shawn Seet	Felicity Packard	23 May 2010
Kim Hollingsworth's police friend, Sergeant Dave, abandons her after she "dobs in" to Internal Affairs a police officer who made sexual advances against her. Kim reaches boiling point when her friend and fellow prostitute Wanda is found dead. Having obtained the HSC via correspondence, she enrolls in a detective's course at Goulburn Police Academy. Debbie Webb leaves King's Cross police and allies herself with her husband Greg Locke and politician John Hatton in campaigning for a Royal Commission of enquiry into the New South Wales Police Force, forever changing the course of history. Frustrated at his inability to fight drug dealing as a uniformed officer, Joe Dooley leaves the King's Cross police and also enrolls at the Goulburn Academy.
35	9	"Dog Eat Dog"	Shawn Seet	Kris Mrksa	30 May 2010
Under pressure from the Wood Royal Commission, Trevor Haken's paranoia reaches an all-new high. However, his paranoia is justified as he discovers the Commission has a lot of incriminating evidence against him. In order to escape conviction, Trevor volunteers to become a "supergrass" and expose corruption in King's Cross. Benny Kassab suspects that he has a rat in his ranks – he believes that his associate, Norm Korbage, is working with police to expose him. After Kassab is arrested trying to flee the country, he figures out it was Norm who turned him in. Kim Hollingsworth's colourful past comes back to haunt her – she is asked by corrupt detective Eddie Gould to be the madam of a new brothel he is opening. She reports the incident to the Wood Royal Commission, and in so doing, exposes her past as a stripper and a prostitute.
36	10	"Hurt on Duty"	Tony Tilse	Kris Mrksa	6 June 2010
King's Cross detectives Graham "Chook" Fowler and Neville "Scully" Scullion are called to testify to the Wood Royal Commission. On orders of the Commission, Trevor Haken wears a wire to a meeting with Bill Bayeh in order to expose corruption in King's Cross. Whilst Fowler denies he is involved in corruption, he is shown covert video footage of him accepting a bribe from Trevor Haken. This reveals both the covert nature of the Commission, as well as Haken's status as a "supergrass". Kim Hollingsworth is expelled from the Goulburn Academy for failing to disclose her past work as a prostitute, and is forced to work undercover to expose police corruption, but is almost caught out by corrupt detective Eddie Gould. Danny Karam and Hammer's drug addictions result in both of them robbing Bill Bayeh, causing further tensions between Hammer and John Ibrahim.
37	11	"Beauty and the Beast"	Tony Tilse	Peter Gawler	13 June 2010
Aware that he is being investigated by the Wood Royal Commission, Dennis Kelly dobs in fellow corrupt detective Jim Egan to investigators. When Egan is called to testify at the commission, he commits suicide so that his corrupt dealings are not exposed. John Ibrahim is also called to testify at the Wood Royal Commission, however he refuses to answer questions regarding his interest in Constable Wendy Jones, risking further jail time in addition to his accessory to murder charge. Commission investigator Gerry Lloyd hires Shaka, a former lieutenant to Benny Kassab, to wear a wire to expose the corrupt police working with Bill Bayeh. However, the operation goes awry, resulting in several deaths by overdose and Shaka's own deportation to Lebanon. However, Bayeh is brought down when footage of him manufacturing cocaine is aired at the Commission. Kim Hollingsworth continues to risk her life to expose Eddie Gould's corruption. Lloyd persuades Kim to work on a similar operation with Dennis Kelly. However, the operation fails and Kim is sent by the Commission to Adelaide, where she sees no choice but to return to prostitution.
38	12	"The Good Lieutenant"	Tony Tilse	Felicity Packard	20 June 2010
After the Wood Royal Commission closes, all the old forces of the King's Cross drug trade have been imprisoned and the corrupt police have been cleaned out of the New South Wales police. This leads to a power vacuum in the King's Cross underworld. In order to stake his claim to power in King's Cross, Danny "DK" Karam hires a group of young thugs, led by Michael Kanaan to assist him. Together, they form a ruthless gang and set about taking over the King's Cross drug trade. Kanaan and his associates, Adam, Rabs and Wassi, employ teenage drug runners to sell cocaine on the streets, agitating both police and King's Cross businesses. Brainwashed by Karam's glorified stories of gang warfare, Kanaan shoots two strangers outside the Five Dock Hotel in western Sydney. When Karam reprimands him for his actions, Kanaan feels resentment and suggests to his associates that they kill Karam. Concerned, the NSW Police form Strike Force Lancer to stop this new crimewave, and honest cop Joe Dooley is one of the first to be selected for the job.
39	13	"Alpha and Omega"	Tony Tilse	Greg Haddrick	27 June 2010
In 1998, after disposing of Danny Karam, drug dealer Michael Kanaan devises a plan to murder John Ibrahim and his bodyguard, Kiwi Steve, in order to divert attention but this is thwarted during a wild shootout with police in which Kanaan is badly injured. Dennis Kelly fights off competition from Gerry lloyd and Sid Hillier for the role of Police Commissioner. An angry Kim Hollingsworth returns to Sydney from Adelaide, intending on suing the NSW Police. Meanwhile, Joe Dooley and Strike Force Lancer arrest Michael Kanaan and his gang, restoring peace to the Golden Mile – leaving John Ibrahim as the undisputed King of the Cross.

== Cast ==
=== Main cast ===
- Emma Booth as Kim Hollingsworth, former prostitute, student police officer and undercover police agent
- Dieter Brummer as Trevor Haken, corrupt Kings Cross detective
- Firass Dirani as John Ibrahim, Kings Cross nightclub owner and eventual King of the Cross
- Cheree Cassidy as Debbie Webb, Kings Cross detective and whistleblower
- Wil Traval as Joe Dooley, Kings Cross police officer
- Daniel Roberts as James 'Jimbo' Egan, corrupt Kings Cross detective
- Damien Garvey as Graham 'Chook' Fowler, corrupt head of the Kings Cross detectives
- Paul Tassone as Dennis Kelly, corrupt Chief Inspector

=== Recurring cast ===
- Diarmid Heidenreich as Eddie 'Parrot' Gould, aggressive super-corrupt Kings Cross detective
- Rob Carlton as Neville 'Scully' Scullion, shy and docile Kings Cross detective
- Peter O'Brien as George Freeman, illegal bookmaker, Ibrahim's mentor, and King of the Cross
- John McNeill as Lenny McPherson, arms dealer and organized crime leader
- Salvatore Coco as Harry 'Hammer' Hammoud, Kings Cross stand-over man and associate of Ibrahim (It is argued that this character is really Sam Ibrahim, John's brother.)
- Michael Vice as Benny Kassab, Kings Cross drug dealer. (Albeit the name is different, this character is based on a Kings Cross drug dealer named Robert Daher.)
- Hazem Shammas as Bill Bayeh, King of the Cross and drug kingpin
- Steve Bastoni as Louis Bayeh, racketeer from Parramatta
- Dan Mor as Danny 'DK' Karam, Kings Cross stand-over man, drug dealer and gang leader
- Ryan Corr as Michael "Doc" Kanaan, DK's Lieutenant and member of DK's boys
- Sigrid Thornton as Geraldine 'Gerry' Lloyd, Royal Commission investigator
- Sophie Hensser as Monica
- Caroline Craig as series narrator, reprising her role from the first two series

=== Guest cast ===
- Ronny Mouawad as Norm Korbage, Kassab's associate and drug addict
- Matuse as Shaka, Kassab's associate and drug dealer
- Jason Ghama as Ali Ghazzawie, Kings Cross drug dealer
- Peter Phillips-Vass as Benny Puta, Kings Cross drug dealer
- John Seru as Kiwi Steve, Ibrahim's bodyguard
- George Koutros as Russel 'Bubblehead' Townsend, Ibrahim's associate
- Waddah Sari as Buddy, John Ibrahim's friend and associate
- Michael Gittany as Charlie Fish, John Ibrahim's associate
- Sabeena Manalis as Natalie, John Ibrahim's love interest (1 episode)
- Ben Wood as 'Bad Don' Denucci, Manager and part owner of the Budget hotel with DK
- Rahel Abdulrahman as Talal Assad, Kings Cross drug dealer (1 episode)
- Sophie Hensser as Monica, waitress and Benny Kassab's girlfriend
- Natasha Leigh as Melissa Hollingsworth, Kim Hollingsworth's sister and part-time prostitute
- Lieschen Pogue as Galina, Kim Hollingsworth's friend and fellow prostitute
- Sarah Jane Coombe as Krystal, prostitute (1 episode)
- Kelly Atkinson as Belinda, friend of Kim and prostitute (1 episode)
- Mitch Bartlett as Wanda, transsexual prostitute
- Mark Furze as Trent, Kim Hollingsworth's boyfriend
- Andrew Hazzard as Michael, Kim Hollingsworth's boyfriend and stalker
- Georgina Haig as Georgina Freeman, George Freeman's wife
- Lesley Hancock as Dawn, Madame of the brothel Kim works at
- Russell Kiefel as Mel Mal, Owner of the Tunnel Nightclub which Ibrahim buys into
- Rebecca Lee Slade as Michelle, Classmate and Ibrahim's one time lover (1 episode)
- Hanna Griffiths as Jodie, Adam Andrews' girlfriend
- Hugo Johnstone-Burt as Adam Andrews, Kanaan's best friend and member of DK's boys.
- Anthony Di Placido as Rabeeh 'Rabs' Mawas, member of DK's boys
- Jey Osman as Wassim 'Wassi' El Assaad, member of DK's boys
- Dina Panozzo as Samira Kanaan, Michael Kanaan's mother
- Natalie Bassingthwaighte as Maria Haken, Trevor Haken's wife
- Tom O'Sullivan as Sean 'Grunter' Sinclair, corrupt Kings Cross detective, who turns straight
- Andrew Bibby as Greg Locke, Fraud Squad detective and Debbie Webb's husband
- Jessica Tovey as Wendy Jones, Ibrahim's love interest and police officer (2 episodes)
- Megan Drury as Claudia Campanelli, King's Cross detective and sexual assault victim
- Matt Day as Inspector Sid Hillier, police investigator who leads Strike Force Lancer
- Toby Leonard Moore as Sergeant Dave, Kings Cross police officer and Kim Hollingsworth's lover
- Wayne Pygram as the Commissioner of the NSW police force
- John Waters as MP John Hatton, politician (2 episodes)
- Ian Smith as Ken Wallis, Influential NSW politician (2 episodes)
- Sean Taylor as James Wood, Presiding Justice over the Royal Commission
- James Evans as Ralph Griffin, Kim's handler from the Royal Commission
- Brandon Burke as Bruce Onley, Royal Commission investigator
- Paul Barry as John Agius, Barrister for the Royal Commission
- Alan Cinis as Andy Little, corrupt Fraud Squad detective
- Christopher Truswell as Bobby Flood, corrupt Fraud Squad detective
- Peter Scarf as Constable Andrew, Kings Cross police officer
- Michael Whittington as Constable Pickles, Kings Cross police officer
- Stuart McRae as Les Leopold, Kings Cross police officer
- Anthony Gooley as Marty Ludlow, Trevor Haken's informant (1 episode)
- Anthony Burke as Mick Drury, NSW detective and whistleblower (1 episode)
- Lynette Curran as Irene Webb, Debbie Webb's mother
- Aziz Shavershian as man on the bar sitting near the door
- Daryl Lee as John Webb, Debbie Webb's father
- Megan Miller-McConochie as Mrs Gould, Eddie Gould's wife
- Melissa McCole-Brooks as Mrs Sinclair, Sean Sinclair's wife
- Sandra Galvin as Fran Egan, Jim Egan's wife
- Matilda Brown as Ellie Dooley, Joe Dooley's wife
- Liam Macdonald as Constable Tim Dewey, Kings Cross police officer
- Christopher Mayer as Rich client
- Rahel Romahn as Talal Assaad
- Charlton Hill as IA Officer #1
- Rowan Witt as Koala

== Ratings ==
Episode		Original air date	Timeslot	Viewers (millions)	Nightly rank	Weekly rank
1	"Into the Mystic"	11 April 2010	8:30pm Sunday	2.237	1	1
2	"The Crucible"	11 April 2010	9:30pm Sunday	2.071	2	2
3	"Kingdom Come"	18 April 2010	8:30pm Sunday	1.921	1	1
4	"Fall Guy"	25 April 2010	8:30pm Sunday	1.500	1	2
5	"Saving Face"	9 May 2010	8:30pm Sunday	1.677	1	1
6	"Women in Uniform"	9 May 2010	9:30pm Sunday	1.613	2	2
7	"Full Force Gale"	16 May 2010	8:30pm Sunday	1.645	3	4
8	"Crossroads"	23 May 2010	8:30pm Sunday	1.650	2	4
9	"Dog Eat Dog"	30 May 2010	8:30pm Sunday	1.672	4	5
10	"Hurt on Duty"	6 June 2010	8:30pm Sunday	1.598	3	5
11	"Beauty and the Beast"	13 June 2010	8:30pm Sunday	1.384	4	17
12	"The Good Lieutenant"	20 June 2010	8:30pm Sunday	1.493	4	7
13	"Alpha and Omega"	27 June 2010	8:30pm Sunday	1.800	1	3

== Legal issues ==
In March 2010, former King's Cross policewoman Wendy Hatfield lodged an application in the New South Wales Supreme Court, asking to view five episodes of the series featuring a character supposedly based on her, Wendy Jones, to see if she had been defamed. Her concern was that the series, which was based on a book of the same name she believed had defamed her, would also defame her by implying she had a sexual relationship with John Ibrahim. Her request was denied, with a judge ruling she would only have grounds to lodge defamation proceedings after the fact.

In May 2010, Hatfield lodged a defamation lawsuit with the NSW Supreme Court against the Nine Network, TCN Nine Network Sydney and the producers, Screentime. She believed that she was defamed in episode 6, "Women in Uniform", arguing that the depiction of the character of Wendy Jones, which is allegedly based on her, engaged in an affair with Ibrahim had defamed her and caused her "to be bought into hatred, ridicule and contempt" and "gravely injured her character". The case was to be heard on 22 June.

In December 2010, Hatfield succeeded in a defamation suit against the publishers of Underbelly: The Golden Mile, the tie-in book to the series, being awarded $59,000 in damages.

== See also ==
- Last King of the Cross
