= The Zen of Bennett =

2012 American documentary film

- Promotional poster
- Directed by: Unjoo Moon
- Produced by: Danny Bennett; Jennifer Lebeau
- Starring: Tony Bennett
- Cinematography: Dion Beebe
- Edited by: Katie Mcquerrey; Wyatt Smith
- Production company: Benedetto Films
- Distributed by: Abramorama
- Release dates: April 18, 2012 (Tribeca Film Festival); November 2, 2012 (United States)
- Running time: 84 minutes
- Country: United States
- Language: English

The Zen of Bennett is a 2012 American documentary film that depicts the life of jazz singer Tony Bennett. The film is directed by Unjoo Moon and produced by Bennett's son Danny and Jennifer Lebeau. The documentary was released for Bennett's 85th birthday. It received positive reviews from critics.

== Background ==
The film features Bennett's recording sessions with Andrea Bocelli, Lady Gaga, Amy Winehouse, John Mayer, Willie Nelson, and others. The film is directed by Unjoo Moon and produced by Bennett's son Danny and Jennifer Lebeau.

== Release ==
The film debuted during the 11th Tribeca Film Festival in New York City on April 18, 2012. It was released theatrically on October 24, 2012 in New York, and in Los Angeles, San Francisco, Chicago, Santa Barbara and Palm Springs on November 2, 2012, and continued to expand to other selected cities in the United States throughout November and December. It was later announced that the production company had secured a deal with Netflix for the exclusive streaming availability of the film starting on November 12, 2012 in the United States, Canada, United Kingdom and Latin America. The film was released on DVD on November 19, 2012. The DVD version includes additional material containing deleted scenes, including bonus footage featuring Bennet with Michael Buble and Lady Gaga as well as interviews with the filmmakers.

== Reception ==
The Zen of Bennett received generally positive reviews from critics. The review aggregator website Rotten Tomatoes reported a 67% approval rating with an average rating of 7/10 based on 9 reviews. The website's consensus reads, "This documentary is a seductive and soulful view into the mind of singer Tony Bennett as well as an intimate portrait of the artist's creative process as he turns 85 years old." At Metacritic, which assigns a weighted-mean rating from 0–100 based on reviews by film critics, the film has a rating score of 71 based on 8 reviews (indicating "Generally favorable"). G. Allen Johnson, writing for the San Francisco Chronicle, praised the documentary, especially the singer's interaction with various contemporary artists, also adding that the only regret is that Bennett's "rendition of "I Left My Heart in San Francisco" at Wednesday's Giants victory parade was too late to be included." Robert Abele from the Los Angeles Times praised the film's cinematography and noted how it allowed Bennett "to wax coolly on dressing well, how fame goes but quality stays, and the greats he's known". Abele further exclaimed: "This is when the movie earns its hushed exclusivity and kitschy title, when we see an art form bridge generations with a strange mixture of grace, joy and melancholy."

Dennis Harvey of Variety wrote a mixed review and said, "While the result is sure to appeal to the star’s fans, they may find this less-than-definitive portrait distractingly arty at times, while viewers attracted by such up-to-the-moment talents as Lady Gaga will wonder why the pic doesn’t bother providing a little more explanatory background about that old guy she’s singing with." Stephen Holden reviewed the film for The New York Times and accented the singer's performances with other artists which he described as "electrifying" and "pungent". Holden also noted parts of Bennett's talking about his life, and said: "In simple, blunt language he exalts "quality," "warmth," "feeling," "truth" and "beauty," without trying to define or elaborate on those concepts".

John DeFore of The Hollywood Reporter said that fans of the singer "will love [the film's] intimate mood and class-act portrayal of its subject", and noted that its "cinematography boasts the expected polish, but the film will likely be most popular on small screens". Eric Kohn reviewed the film for Indiewire and described it as an "affable portrait of the legendary crooner". Kohn relished the scene with Winehouse and said that her "simultaneously effusive presence not only illustrates her fragility but stands in sharp contrast to the stable work ethic that Bennett has cultivated over the course of his 60-year career."

David Fear of Time Out New York was less enthusiastic about the documentary and said: "The arbitrary insertion of black-and-white footage suggests [the director] is more interested in channeling a bygone sense of style—when men always wore ties and things were in monochrome, dammit!—than in going too deep." David Guzman from Film Journal International wrote a negative review and said that the film felt like a "one long commercial to get audiences to buy [the album]". Guzman said, "You could glean more about his personality from any of the interviews he’s given over the years than from this documentary, which gazes at him for 84 minutes without really getting a good look." Mike Scott of The Times-Picayune also noted the documentary's commercial purpose by saying that "the film at times is weighted with the feel of a carefully curated promotional film". However, Scott liked the collaborations between the artists: "It's just as enjoyable to see the unbridled pleasure these stars get from singing with Bennett, and from benefitting from his knowledge and experience."
