= Chelsea Cullen =

Australian musician

- Born: 27 May 1994 (age 31)
- Origin: Perth, Western Australia, Australia
- Genres: Pop
- Occupation: Musician
- Instrument: Vocals
- Years active: 2017–present
- Website: www.chelseacullen.com

Chelsea Cullen (born 27 May 1994) is an Australian pop singer. Cullen provided the singing voice of Helen Reddy in the 2019 biographical film, I Am Woman, for which she won an ARIA Music Award.

== Discography ==
=== Soundtracks ===
Title	Album details
I Am Woman	Release date: 21 August 2020; Label: Goalpost, Sony (19439761892); Formats: CD, digital

=== Extended plays ===
Title	EP details
Edge of Myself	Release date: 15 February 2018; Label: Chelsea Cullen; Formats: digital

=== Singles ===
List of appearances on other albums or compilations
Title	Year	Album
"Apple Gustard" (Lofty Heights featuring Chelsea Cullen)	2015	
"Truth"	2017	Edge of Myself

== Awards and nominations ==
=== ARIA Music Awards ===
The ARIA Music Awards is an annual awards ceremony that recognises excellence, innovation, and achievement across all genres of Australian music. Cullen has received 1 nomination.

Year	Nominee / work	Award	Result
2020	I Am Woman (Original Soundtrack)	Best Original Soundtrack or Musical Theatre Cast Album	Won
