= What a Piece of Work =

Book by Dorothy Porter

- First edition
- Author: Dorothy Porter
- Language: English
- Publisher: Picador, Australia
- Publication date: 1999
- Publication place: Australia
- Media type: Print (Paperback)
- Pages: 276
- ISBN: 0330361287
- Preceded by: The Monkey's Mask
- Followed by: Wild Surmise

What a Piece of Work is a 1999 verse novel by Australian poet Dorothy Porter which was shortlisted for the 2000 Miles Franklin Award.

== Notes ==
- Dedication: for Judith Beveridge
- Epigraph: What a piece of work is a man, how noble in reason, how infinite in faculties, in form and moving, how express and admirable in action, how like an angel in apprehension, how like a god. William Shakespeare, Hamlet
- All the stages or processes of alchemy are distinguished by colours ... Latin alchemists nearly always commence with the nigredo, the dark, black stage of melancholy, death and mortification. Mark Haeffner, Dictionary of Alchemy
- For it was clear to the more astute alchemists that the prima materia of the art was man himself. C.G.Jung, Mysterium Conjunctionis

== Author's notes ==
In an address to the Tasmanian Writers' and Readers' festival in August 1999, Porter stated: "This is a verse novel in the voice of a male psychiatrist, Doctor Peter Cyren, working in Sydney's Callan Park Mental Hospital in the late 60s, who goes from pretty bad to heinous worse. My model here was Shakespeare with his black-hearted but full blooded creations such as Macbeth and Iago. The challenge is to make bad men good company. And Shakespeare takes that hurdle with magnificent ease."

== Reviews ==
- The Sydney Morning Herald

== Awards and nominations ==
- 2000 shortlisted Miles Franklin Literary Award
