= Jonathan Mills (composer) =

Australian composer and festival director (born 1963)

Sir Jonathan Mills (born 21 March 1963) is an Australian composer and festival director. He was born and raised in Sydney and has dual Australian and UK citizenship. His work includes operas, an oratorio, a ballet, song cycles, concertos, and chamber music. He has directed a number of arts festivals in Australia, and from 2006 to 2014 he was director of the Edinburgh International Festival.

== Biography ==
Jonathan Edward Harland Mills was born in Sydney on 21 March 1963. He has Scottish roots, his maternal grandfather having been a Scot from Partick. His father Frank Harland Mills was a heart surgeon.

He gained a Bachelor of Music in composition from the University of Sydney in 1984, where he was associated with St Paul's College. He studied under Peter Sculthorpe.

Mills was a research fellow and composer-in-residence at RMIT University, Melbourne, between 1992 and 1997. He graduated as Master of Architecture at RMIT in 1999, focusing on acoustic design and the role of sound in the built environment. Between 1998 and 2003 he was an adjunct professor at RMIT.

Between 1988 and 2003 he was the artistic director of music festivals in Sydney, Brisbane and Melbourne. These included the Melbourne International Arts Festival, the Melbourne Federation Festival, the Melbourne Millennium Eve Celebrations, and the Brisbane Biennial International Music Festival (inaugural artistic adviser 1995–97).

It was during these years that he composed Four First Songs, a song cycle for radio on poems by Martin Harrison, and the ballet The Ethereal Eye, which focussed on the architects who designed and built Canberra as the new capital of Australia. In 1999 came his first chamber opera, The Ghost Wife, to a libretto by Dorothy Porter based on the short story The Chosen Vessel by Barbara Baynton, set in the Australian bush at the beginning of the twentieth century. The opera was premiered at the 1999 Melbourne Festival and had numerous productions in other capitals. It had its London premiere at the Barbican Theatre in November 2002, staged by OzOpera, under conductor Richard Gill. This was believed to be the first Australian opera with an Australian cast to have a London season.

In 2001 he wrote Sandakan Threnody, an oratorio for tenor, choir, and orchestra. It is based on the real-life story of the 2,345 Australian and British prisoners of war who in 1945 were sent on a series of death marches from the Japanese camp in Sandakan, Borneo – only six would survive. It was revised and premiered as part of Sydney Symphony Orchestra's 2004 "Meet the Music" series at the Sydney Opera House, and was later performed at the Singapore, Brisbane and Melbourne Festivals. In 2005 it was awarded the Prix Italia. Mills' father Frank Mills survived incarceration at Sandakan.

In 2003 came Mills' chamber opera The Eternity Man, commissioned as a Genesis Foundation Prize by Almeida/Aldeburgh Opera and premiered in London in July that year. It was based on the life of Arthur Stace. Mills revised it in 2007, and in 2008 Julien Temple filmed it for television with broadcasts by Channel 4 in 2008 and ABC Television in 2009 and funded by them. The film of The Eternity Man won various awards, including Best Experimental Film at Australia's 2008 ATOM Awards, the Judges Award for Best Work of the Year at the Queensland Australian Cinematography Awards and the Swiss Rose d'Or (2009).

His opera Eucalyptus, to a libretto by Meredith Oakes based on the 1998 novel by Murray Bail, premiered in a concert performance conducted by Tahu Matheson at the Perth Festival in 2024; later that year, it was performed staged at the Brisbane Festival and in Melbourne.

He was Vice-Chancellor's (Professorial) Fellow at the University of Melbourne, director of the Alfred Deakin Lectures and an artistic advisor to the Melbourne Recital Centre (including Elisabeth Murdoch Hall).

In 2006 he was appointed director and chief executive of the Edinburgh International Festival. His term was twice extended, and concluded at the end of 2014.

In 2011 he was appointed international artistic adviser of the Arts Centre Melbourne till the end of 2012, in addition to his existing commitments in Edinburgh. He divides his time between Edinburgh and Melbourne.

== Honours ==
In 2001 Jonathan Mills was awarded the Centenary Medal.

In 2008 he was named an honorary doctor of the University of Stirling.

In 2010 he was appointed fellow of the Royal Society of Edinburgh.

In the Australian 2011 Queen's Birthday Honours, he was appointed an Officer of the Order of Australia (AO), "for distinguished service to the performing arts as a composer and director of international festivals, through the promotion of cultural exchange, and to public debate".

He was knighted in the UK Queen's Birthday Honours of 2013.

He was appointed a Knight of the Order of Arts and Letters (Chevalier de l'Ordre des Arts et des Lettres) by the French Minister of Culture in 2013. He was awarded the Medal for Merit to Culture – Gloria Artis (Zasłużony Kulturze – Gloria Artis) of the Republic of Poland in 2013.

In 2013 was awarded an honorary doctorate of letters by the University of St Andrews, and an honorary doctorate of arts by RMIT University.

He is also an honorary doctor of the University of Edinburgh.

He was awarded an honorary doctorate of music by the University of Sydney in 2015.

In the 2024 King's Birthday Honours list, he was appointed a Companion of the Order of Australia (AC), "for eminent service to international cultural leadership and diplomacy, to the performing arts, to philanthropic ventures, and to tertiary education".

== Personal life ==
In March 2013 Mills entered into a civil partnership with his partner of seven years, Ben Divall, whom he had met in Melbourne.
