= I Am Woman (film) =

2019 biopic about Helen Reddy

- Theatrical release poster
- Directed by: Unjoo Moon
- Written by: Emma Jensen
- Produced by: Rosemary Blight; Unjoo Moon
- Starring: Tilda Cobham-Hervey; Danielle Macdonald; Evan Peters
- Cinematography: Dion Beebe
- Edited by: Dany Cooper
- Music by: Rafael May; Michael Tan; Bry Jones
- Production companies: Goalpost Pictures; Screen Australia; Cowlick Entertainment; WestEnd Films
- Distributed by: Stan
- Release dates: 5 September 2019 (TIFF); 28 August 2020 (Australia)
- Running time: 116 minutes
- Country: Australia
- Language: English

I Am Woman is a 2019 Australian biographical film about singer Helen Reddy, directed and produced by Unjoo Moon, from a screenplay by Emma Jensen. Tilda Cobham-Hervey stars as Reddy alongside Evan Peters, as her manager husband Jeff Wald, and Danielle Macdonald as rock writer Lilian Roxon.

== Plot ==
In 1966, Helen Reddy arrives in New York City to record an album, the result of her having won a contest in her home country of Australia. She meets with the record label, only for them to renege on the deal, leaving her stranded with her three-year-old daughter Traci. Lonely and in need of money, Reddy begins singing at small nightclubs and looks up her old friend, rock journalist Lilian Roxon. At a party given by Roxon, Reddy meets talent agent Jeff Wald. Reddy and Wald begin dating and Wald takes her on as a client. They marry and relocate to Los Angeles, which Wald feels will offer more opportunities for their respective careers.

Initially, Wald has little success in promoting his wife, as record companies favor male groups. Repeated insistent calls to Capitol Records land Reddy the opportunity to record a single. Wald enlists family and friends to help promote the demo by requesting it on radio stations and soon the B side, a cover of "I Don't Know How to Love Him", becomes Reddy's first hit. They buy a much larger home and begin indulging in the Hollywood lifestyle, with Wald picking up a cocaine habit.

Reddy becomes interested in the burgeoning feminist movement, inspiring her to write "I Am Woman." Though executives pronounce the song "angry" and "man-hating," Wald encourages Reddy to add it to her concert repertoire. Soon, it becomes her biggest hit and a feminist anthem.

Within a few years, she gains eight number one adult contemporary US singles, as well as her own television show and residency in Las Vegas, but the pressures of the industry strain her marriage. Once again, Reddy seeks support from Roxon, only to find her friend in poor health. When Roxon dies of asthma, Reddy attempts to cancel her upcoming concerts, but Wald insists she keep her commitments.

After a successful show, Reddy finds her husband backstage, under the influence of cocaine and assaulting recording company personnel. Overcome by shock and exhaustion, Reddy collapses and wakes up in the emergency room to discover the Equal Rights Amendment, a feminist cornerstone, has been defeated. She returns home and finds she and Wald are deeply in debt, which Wald blames on their accountant. They divorce, sell the house, and Reddy retires from show business in the early 1980s.

In 1989, Traci approaches her to perform at a feminist rally in Washington, D.C. Reddy demurs at first, but the film ends with her performing "I Am Woman" in the National Mall, with thousands of her fellow activists singing along.

== Cast ==
- Tilda Cobham-Hervey as Helen Reddy
- Evan Peters as Jeff Wald
- Danielle Macdonald as Lilian Roxon
- Molly Broadstock as Traci
  - Coco Greenstone as Young Traci
- Chris Parnell as Artie Mogull
- Jordan Raskopoulos as George Sylvia
- Matty Cardarople as Roy Meyer
- Liam Douglas as Jordan
- Chelsea Cullen as the singing voice of Helen Reddy

== Production ==
Reddy lived in a care facility in Los Angeles before her death one month after the film's Australian release, and her family advised the filmmakers on the project. Moon said she felt great responsibility to Helen to ensure the story was told sensitively: "Before we locked the movie off, Producer Rosemary Blight (Goalpost Pictures) and I felt very strongly that we needed to show the movie to Helen and her family. We did a screening for Helen, her ex-husband Jeff Wald, and her two children. As a filmmaker, sitting in the cinema with Helen Reddy was, and it’s probably going to be, one of the hardest screenings I had to do for the film. I suddenly realised that this is her life and she was watching it through my eyes. During the screening, Helen sang along to her songs, and when she cried, it wasn’t because she was sad that we made the movie, she cried because she found the whole experience so touching, and I think really cathartic in a way."

Screen Australia is the principal investor in the film, alongside Cowlick Entertainment, and arts body Create NSW, with further funding from the Goodship Women's Fund, which supports films with strong social change messaging.

== Release ==
The film had its world premiere at the Toronto International Film Festival on 5 September 2019.

It was shown at the 24th Busan International Film Festival in Busan, South Korea, in October 2019.

The film was chosen to open the 10th annual Athena Film Festival at Barnard College of Columbia University in New York, which celebrates women, on 27 February 2020.

It was reported on 31 March 2020 (before the extent of the COVID-19 pandemic was known) that I Am Woman was scheduled for release in Australia by Transmission Films, in North America through Aqute Media, and elsewhere by Metropolitan (France), Nos (Portugal), Inopia (Spain), Videovision (South Africa), Front Row (Middle East), Bliss Media (China), Scene & Sound (South Korea), Ale Kino+ (Poland), VTI (former Yugoslavia), Cineplex (Taiwan), Golden A Entertainment (Thailand) and Cinesky (airlines).

Premiere screenings were shown at cinemas around Adelaide (star Cobham-Hervey's home town) from 22 to 23 August 2020, presented by the Adelaide Film Festival. It streams throughout Australia on the Stan platform from 28 August 2020.

== Critical response ==
As of October 2021 the film holds an approval rating of 67% based on 81 reviews on review aggregator Rotten Tomatoes, with an average rating of 6.1/10. The site's critics consensus reads: "I Am Woman sticks disappointingly close to standard biopic formula, but Tilda Cobham-Hervey's performance keeps this affectionate, watchable tribute from falling flat."

Indiewire declared the film “a cut above other genre entries”, while David Rooney of The Hollywood Reporter described it as “entertaining and sharply packaged” with “considerable appeal”. He said of Cobham-Hervey's performance: "The crucial thing is that you really root for Helen — to make it in the first place and then to make it through a nightmarish marriage and come out unbroken. The luminous Cobham-Hervey has you in the corner of this smart, pragmatic, quietly driven woman all the way."

Toronto movie review site That Shelf called it a “sure fire crowd pleaser”.

Moon was awarded the Athena Breakthrough Award at the Athena Film Festival.

=== Accolades ===
Award	Category	Subject	Result
AACTA Awards (10th)	Best Film	Rosemary Blight	Nominated
AACTA Awards (10th)	Best Film	Unjoo Moon	Nominated
AACTA Awards (10th)	Best Actress	Tilda Cobham-Hervey	Nominated
AACTA Awards (10th)	Best Editing	Dany Cooper	Nominated
AACTA Awards (10th)	Best Original Music Score	Rafael May	Nominated
AACTA Awards (10th)	Best Sound	Robert Mackenzie	Nominated
AACTA Awards (10th)	Best Sound	Ben Osmo	Nominated
AACTA Awards (10th)	Best Sound	Pete Smith	Nominated
AACTA Awards (10th)	Best Sound	Tara Webb	Nominated
AACTA Awards (10th)	Best Production Design	Richie Dehne	Nominated
AACTA Awards (10th)	Best Production Design	Michael Turner	Nominated
AACTA Awards (10th)	Best Costume Design	Emily Seresin	Nominated
AACTA Awards (10th)	Best Hair and Makeup	Nikki Gooley	Nominated
AACTA Awards (10th)	Best Hair and Makeup	Cassie O’Brien	Nominated
AACTA Awards (10th)	Best Hair and Makeup	Wendy de Waal	Nominated
AACTA Awards (10th)	Best Casting	Nikki Barrett	Nominated

== Soundtrack ==
I Am Woman (Original Motion Picture Soundtrack)

Soundtrack album by Chelsea Cullen
- Released: 21 August 2020
- Labels: Goalpost, Sony Music Australia

A soundtrack was released by Goalpost and distributed by Sony Music Australia on 21 August 2020 (formats: CD cat. no. 19439761892, and digital). It was produced by Bry Jones and Michael Tan, and features Chelsea Cullen who provided the singing voice of Reddy in the film.

At the 2020 ARIA Music Awards it won ARIA Award for Best Original Soundtrack, Cast or Show Album.

=== Track listing ===
No.	Title	Writer(s)	Performer(s)	Length
1.	"I Am Woman" (1989 version)	Ray Burton; Helen Reddy	Chelsea Cullen	3:41
2.	"I Don't Know How to Love Him"	Andrew Lloyd Webber; Tim Rice	Chelsea Cullen	3:20
3.	"That's All"	Alan Brandt; Bob Haymes	Chelsea Cullen	4:27
4.	"Leave Me Alone"	Linda Laurie	Chelsea Cullen	3:42
5.	"Delta Dawn"	Larry Collins; Alex Harvey	Chelsea Cullen	2:50
6.	"You and Me Against the World"	Kenny Ascher; Paul Williams	Chelsea Cullen	2:46
7.	"Angie Baby"	Alan O'Day	Chelsea Cullen	3:31
8.	"Love Song for Jeffrey"	Peter Allen; Reddy	Chelsea Cullen	2:43
9.	"Ain't No Way to Treat a Lady"	Harriet Schock	Chelsea Cullen	3:21
10.	"Revolution"	Alex Hope	Lily Donat	2:51
11.	"I Am Woman" (1972 version)	Burton; Reddy	Chelsea Cullen	3:22
