= Kim Hollingsworth =

Australian prostitute (born 1966)

- Born: Kim Michelle Hollingsworth; 1966 (age 59–60); Wodonga, Victoria, Australia
- Education: High school
- Occupation: Equestrianism
- Years active: 1985 – present
- Known for: Colourful past, fight for reinstatement as a police trainee, animal cruelty.

Kim Michelle Hollingsworth (born 1966) is an Australian woman who was formerly a stripper, prostitute, student police officer and undercover agent. She was dismissed from the New South Wales Police Academy for failing to disclose her past. Her judicial attempts for reinstatement were ultimately unsuccessful.

== Early life ==
Hollingsworth was born in 1966, the daughter of a Victorian police officer. After completing her schooling at Wodonga West High School in 1984, she moved to Sydney. After a succession of jobs including shop assistant and waitress, she turned to stripping and eventually prostitution. She sometimes performed at fundraising functions and buck's nights frequented by police officers, occasionally leading to paid sex. During her eight years as a prostitute, Hollingsworth became aware of some police extorting brothel keepers and demanding sexual favours from prostitutes.

== Police trainee and undercover agent ==
In 1994 Hollingsworth applied to join the New South Wales Police Force but failed the physical agility test. She applied successfully in 1995 and was sent to the New South Wales Police Academy in Goulburn. She began well and earned positive comments in her class report.

As other students became aware of her past, she was subjected to harassment and requests for sexual favours. About one month after commencing her studies, Hollingsworth was recognised as a former prostitute by a police officer studying a detectives course at the academy. He approached her to work in a brothel that he was opening in western Sydney.

=== Undercover agent ===
Hollingsworth lodged a formal complaint against the detective. The matter came to the attention of the Royal Commission into the New South Wales Police Service, which was at that time investigating police corruption. In meetings with staff assisting the Commission she named a further 20 officers who frequented brothels and strip shows. Hollingsworth subsequently stated that the Royal Commission encouraged her to return to prostitution to collect information on police involvement in the vice industry. Her flat was fitted with a hidden camera and she wore a "wire" to entrap the corrupt police officer, who by then was skimming 10% of Hollingsworth's income from prostitution.

Hollingsworth was subsequently sent to Adelaide for her own protection. It was alleged she was encouraged by police to again return to prostitution to support herself.

=== Dismissal and fight for reinstatement ===
On 18 July 1995, while Hollingsworth was co-operating with the Royal Commission, Superintendent R. J. Myatt, Acting Principal at the academy, dismissed her for omitting information about her previous employment in her application.

In 1997, Hollingsworth appealed her dismissal with the Industrial Relations Commission of New South Wales (IRC). Commissioner Connor ordered the Police Service to reinstate Hollingsworth to her former position as a student police officer and to pay her $35,000 in lost income.

The Police Service appealed this decision. On 22 December 1997, the full bench of the IRC quashed her reinstatement, noting Hollingsworth's deception of the Police Service at the time of her recruitment. The Commission noted, "room for sympathy for Ms Hollingsworth and the position which she is in, particularly after her substantial co-operation with the Police Royal Commission".

On 21 May 1999, a counter appeal by Hollingsworth was determined in her favour by the IRC. The Police Service was ordered to reinstate her to her former position as a student police officer and to recommence her training with the next intake after 21 May 1999, and that the amount of $35,000 be paid no later than 28 May 1999.

By the time of Hollingsworth's reinstatement, initial police training had been transferred to Charles Sturt University where students were required to complete three sessions of the Diploma of Policing Practice, prior to appointment as a probationary constable. Hollingsworth agreed to participate in that program. Despite attempting to study at the college on three occasions, she was subjected to harassment and ridicule from other students and left the program.

In 2006, then aged 40, Hollingsworth launched a last-ditch effort to join the Police Force. She returned to court and sought to enforce the earlier orders to be employed as a student police officer. The court found that the position had since been abolished, and it had no power to vary the earlier decision.

Hollingsworth's business interests now include horse agistment and trail riding.

== Equine issues ==
Hollingsworth has been a vegetarian since childhood. She became a vegan in the 1990s. Had she gained reinstatement as a police trainee, Hollingsworth intended to pursue a vegan police uniform and footwear.

In 2004, Hollingsworth gave evidence against a horse property owner accused of failing to exercise reasonable care for a horse on agistment. She also led protests against the captivity of animals in Australian circuses.

In 2012, 11 horses under Hollingsworth's care were seized by the RSPCA and placed under veterinary treatment. In December 2012, Hollingsworth was charged with hindering an animal welfare officer. In April 2013, she faced 11 charges relating to animal cruelty.

In August 2013, Hollingsworth pleaded guilty to charges of animal neglect for horses that were seized by the RSPCA in July 2012. She was convicted and ordered to pay costs of $49,180.63, witness expenses of $10,876.60 and veterinary fees of $88,403.36 and was prohibited from owning more than 20 horses for two years. In November 2013, the RSPCA NSW withdrew animal cruelty charges for horses that were seized in December 2012, based on forensic evidence.

In November 2014, Hollingsworth was convicted of 14 charges relating to neglect of five horses. The charges were contested. The magistrate awarded custody of the horses to the RSPCA, ordered Hollingsworth to pay the RSPCA $114,000, and prohibited her from owning more than 20 horses for two years and put her on a two-year good behaviour bond. Hollingsworth's challenge to her convictions in the NSW Court of Appeal was unsuccessful.

In December 2017, Hollingsworth was convicted of multiple animal cruelty charges and given a suspended jail. Hollingsworth was also ordered to pay almost $140,000 in vet and boarding bills. This was in regard to 40 horses in her charge and the 10th time Hollingsworth had been charged with animal cruelty.

== Depictions in the media ==
In 2002, the Seven Network and Screentime Australia considered a biopic called Blue Lady, to be based on the life of Hollingsworth, depicted as "the true story of Kim Hollingsworth's determined, terrifying and courageous journey from stripper to police officer". The program did not proceed to production.

Following the success of the first two series of Underbelly, the Nine Network and Screentime Australia produced a third series, Underbelly: The Golden Mile, set in Kings Cross, Sydney in 1989. Hollingsworth's character, played by Emma Booth, featured in the series. Executive producer Des Monaghan said "It's a remarkable role because Kim Hollingsworth is a remarkable woman. Her story is one we've been interested in for a long time." Hollingsworth is described as "one of the series' most compelling characters". Hollingsworth was a key adviser on the production.

A companion book to the series was published in 2010. Its summary notes "Kim Hollingsworth is a policeman's daughter who wants to follow daddy's footsteps. She's a stripper and a hooker but that's no problem – until she blows the whistle on bent cops who think they can stand over her".

In 2010, Hollingsworth appeared in a bikini spread in lads' mag Zoo Weekly at age 44.
