= The Skating Rink (opera) =

Opera by David Sawer

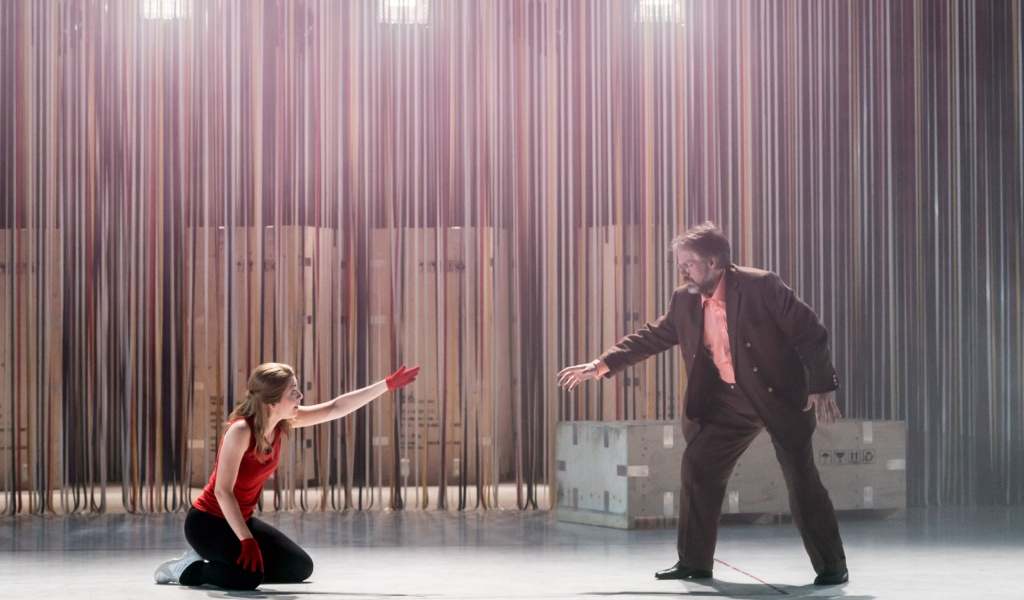
A scene from the 2018 world premiere performance of The Skating Rink by Garsington Opera

The Skating Rink is a British opera in three acts and an epilogue, with music by David Sawer and libretto by Rory Mullarkey. The opera, Sawer's fourth opera, is based on the novella The Skating Rink by Roberto Bolaño. Garsington Opera commissioned the opera and premiered it on 5 July 2018. In his score, Sawer incorporates Latin-American influences such as the charango in its instrumentation.

== Roles ==
Role	Voice type	Premiere cast, Garsington Opera, 5 July 2018 (Conductor: Garry Walker)
Enric	baritone	Grant Doyle
Gaspar	tenor	Sam Furness
Remo	baritone	Ben Edquist
Carmen	mezzo-soprano	Susan Bickley
Nuria (sung role)	soprano	Lauren Zolezzi
Nuria (skater, silent role)	figure skater	Alice Poggio
Rookie	tenor	Alan Oke
Pilar	mezzo-soprano	Louise Winter
Karaoke Singer	baritone	Stephen Beard

== Synopsis ==
- Place: A small seaside town on the Costa Brava, Spain.
- Time: Towards the end of the summer, early 1990s.

The opera's three acts tell the story from the different viewpoints of three male narrators (one Mexican, one Chilean, and one Spaniard), revolving around the figure-skater Nuria Martí.

Act 1: Gaspar
Gaspar, a young Mexican would-be poet, works as a night watchman at the Stella Maris campsite. His boss, Remo Moran, a Chilean businessman, orders him to evict two female vagrants, Caridad and Carmen, who have been staying there for free.

Gaspar is reluctant, as he has grown attached to Caridad. However, he obeys Remo, in order to keep his job, and delivers the news. Both women, especially Carmen, an assertive former opera singer, initially resist their eviction, but then leave.

With time, Gaspar continues to think about Caridad. He searches for her in town and finds Carmen, whom he follows through a dreamlike fiesta, until he spots her arguing with Rookie, presumably her lover. Gaspar then notices Caridad in the crowd, and follows her all the way to the Palacio Benvingut, a dilapidated mansion on the outskirts.

Inside the mansion, Gaspar discovers an ice-rink, where a beautiful young figure skater, Nuria, is skating, watched by an older man, Enric. Gaspar sees Caridad in the shadows with a knife.

Act 2: Remo
Remo receives instructions from Enric, the town's head of social services, to remove all vagrants from his campsite. He ignores the order, and devotes his energy instead to Nuria, the skater, who has recently become his girlfriend.

The initial passion of Remo and Nuria's relationship has been marred by the thwarting of her career prospects. Her funding has been cut, and she has nowhere to train.

The couple take a romantic swim, and later encounter Enric. Remo sees that Enric is jealous of his relationship with Nuria, and decides to fulfill Enric's order about the vagrants to attempt to dispel Enric's ire. Carmen and Caridad are evicted from the campsite.

Nuria begins to spend less and less time with Remo. Unable to find her, Remo turns to drink. In a seafront bar one evening, he meets Carmen and Rookie. Carmen entertains the patrons with her singing, and hints that she has information unfavourable to Enric.

Gaspar arrives at Remo's room and tells him that he has located Nuria, at the Palacio Benvingut. Remo rushes there, discovers the skating rink, and discovers the body of Carmen, stabbed to death on the ice.

Act 3: Enric
With the local elections looming, Pilar, the town's socialist mayor, tasks Enric with ridding the area of vagrants.

Enric sings of his growing obsession with Nuria. After finding out about the loss of her funding, he embezzles public money and builds her a secret ice-rink in the Palacio Benvingut. He hopes that this gesture will make her fall in love with him. He goes with her to the ice-rink every afternoon and watches her train. He dreams that he himself can figure-skate.

When Enric runs into Remo and Nuria together on the beach, his hopes of romance are dashed. Carmen and Caridad are evicted from the campsite.

Nuria falls over while training. She senses Enric's jealousy and assures him her relationship with Remo is purely physical. Enric goes out onto the ice and attempts to dance for her but is startled by a noise off in the shadows.

Carmen visits Enric in his office. She and Caridad stumbled upon the secret ice-rink while searching for a new place to stay, and Carmen now attempts to blackmail Enric in return for her silence. Enric gives Carmen some money and she goes, warning Enric that she wants more.

At a pre-election rally at a disco, Pilar welcomes the guests. Nuria accidentally reveals the existence of the ice-rink to Pilar, who instantly surmises Enric's embezzlement. Enric attempts to maintain his composure by dancing with Nuria, while a karaoke singer sings in the background. Pilar confronts Enric, who admits stealing the funds. Remo arrives with the police and accuses Enric of Carmen's murder. Enric protests his innocence, and his love for Nuria, as the police escort Enric away.

Coda
Gaspar finds Caridad on the ice, clutching a bloody knife. Caridad swears that she is not the murderer. Gaspar advises that the two of them can flee to Mexico.

Enric relates the consequences of his actions, including his conviction for of embezzlement and sentence to two years, as well as the local election results. Nuria was dropped from the skating team, but acknowledges her affection for Enric. She promises to wait for him.

Remo meets Rookie on the beach at night. Their conversation reveals the identity of Carmen's murderer.
