= Michael Kanaan =

Australian triple murderer from Sydney (born 1975)

- Born: 23 May 1975 (age 51); Australia
- Other name: "Doc"
- Criminal charge: Murder × 3, malicious wounding with intent to do grievous bodily harm × 4, discharge firearm with intent to prevent lawful apprehension × 1, accessory after the fact to malicious wounding × 1
- Penalty: 3 × life imprisonment + 50 years 4 months

Michael Kanaan (born 23 May 1975) is an Australian gangster and triple murderer from Sydney, currently serving three sentences of life imprisonment plus 50 years and 4 months without the possibility of parole, for the murder of three people and other offences, all committed in Sydney between 17 July 1998 and 22 December 1998. In the drama series Underbelly: The Golden Mile, he was portrayed by actor Ryan Corr.

== Early years ==
Kanaan was born into a Lebanese Christian family. A psychologist's report in 2001 indicated that Kanaan experienced a normal, stable upbringing, that he and his family had a deep devotion to the Christian faith and that he abstained from the consumption of alcohol. He attended CBHS Lewisham in Sydney and achieved a good result in his Higher School Certificate. He entered a degree course at university with a view to entering the Australian Federal Police, but following a conviction for an assault charge, he instead entered the computer industry.

== DK's Boys ==
In the late 1990s, Danny Karam formed a criminal gang using his own initials: DK's Boys. Karam and the gang's principal criminal activity was the distribution and sale of cocaine in the inner-Sydney suburb of Kings Cross. Other members included Kanaan, Rabeeh Mawas, Wassim El-Assaad, Charlie Gea Gea, Saleh Jamal, and a further male who would later be given the pseudonym Alan Rossini. Karam's gang was made up of predominately Middle-Eastern men from the suburbs in Sydney's inner-city, where the gang also worked for Karam on the street. The DK's Boys drug gang took control of Sydney's criminal drug trade with violence and intimidation.

== The crimes ==
=== The Five Dock murders: 17 July 1998 ===
On the evidence of Rossini, he, along with Kanaan, Shadi Derbas, Bassam Kazzi and an unidentified man, drove to a cafe in Five Dock in Sydney's inner-western suburbs. Shortly after leaving the café they stopped on Great North Road at traffic lights. Nearby was the Five Dock Hotel. On the footpath, two friends, Ronald Singleton and Michael Hurle were involved in an altercation, and they were joined by a third friend, Adam Wright. Rossini yelled to the trio "Come on, fellas, punch on". Singleton replied with a racist comment and a fight involving the three patrons, Rossini, Kazzi and Kanaan ensued. Kanaan produced a gun and fired at least four shots (witnesses reported varying numbers of shots) before the group drove off.

Singleton had been shot through the right arm, although he did not realise this until the group had driven off. He survived. Wright was shot in the lower abdomen. Hurle had been shot in the lower left chest, while a second bullet had passed through his clothing and missed his body. Wright and Hurle were hospitalised but both died the following day.

=== The Greenacre shooting: 13 October 1998 ===
Kanaan and Jamal shot Elias "Les" Elias at Greenacre, in Sydney's south-west, following a dispute over a gun. Again, on the evidence of "Rossini", Kanaan was challenged when he intervened in a verbal altercation. "Who the fuck are you?" asked Elias. Kanaan produced his gun, said "Who the fuck am I?" and started shooting at Elias' feet. Jamal fired two shots at Elias, hitting him in the buttock. He later described the attack, saying "Fuck Les, I shot him in the arse. The cops are going to shit. Two kneecappings in the one day, in the same place."

=== Edward Lee murder: 17 October 1998 ===
14 year-old Edward Lee was stabbed to death by Moustapha Dib on infamous Telopea Street in Punchbowl in Sydney's south-west.

Kanaan, who had links to most of those present at the scene, was informed of the situation, and was involved, along with Moustapha's brother, and Narwas Refai, in arranging for the Dib brothers to be transported to Queensland and alibis created by way of associates in Queensland booking a motel and ordering food under the Dibs' names.

=== Lakemba Police Station shooting: 1 November 1998 ===
In the early hours of the morning, 17 shots were fired at the police station in Lakemba, in Sydney's south-west. Kanaan and El-Assaad were found not guilty by a District Court jury on 16 May 2005. On 28 May 2012 Jamal was sentenced to 12 years for the drive by shooting with a non-parole period of 6 years and 6 months .

=== Redfern shooting: 11 November 1998 ===
Kanaan, El-Assaad and Jamal were charged in relation to a shooting incident on Eveleigh Street, Redfern, in Sydney's inner-west. The charges against Jamal were dropped and the charges against Kanaan and El-Assaad also appear to have been dropped.

=== Danny Karam murder: 13 December 1998 ===
In 1998, members of DK's Boys decided to kill Karam. Kanaan had expressed suspicions a year before the killing that Mr Karam was cheating him. He said they were doing all the work and taking all the risks while their boss was grabbing all the profits. At the time the group operated out of a unit in Riley Street, Surry Hills, in Sydney's inner-city. When Karam arrived at the unit, Kanaan, Mawas, El-Assaad and Gea Gea armed themselves and left the unit. El-Assaad re-entered the unit. Karam spent a few minutes talking before leaving for his car, which was parked on the street outside. As he sat in his car and despite being armed himself, Karam was ambushed and shot 16 times in the head and was killed. He left behind a wife and daughter

=== White City Police shooting: 22 December 1998 ===
According to Rossini, he, Kanaan, El-Assaad and Mark Cheikh drove around Sydney's inner-eastern suburbs. They were armed and on their way to shoot Kings Cross drug enforcer "Tongan Sam". Constables John Fotopoulos and Christopher Patrech followed them in their police vehicle to the end of Alma Street, Paddington. Kanaan and the others left their vehicle and proceeded on foot to Weigall Sports Ground. Rossini and Cheikh escaped. El-Assaad was tackled by Fotopoulos. Patrech climbed the fence of a tennis court in pursuit of Kanaan and was shot in the right thigh by Kanaan. As he hung there he was shot in the right wrist. He fell from the fence, fracturing his right ankle and injuring his hip. Taking cover, he called to Fotopoulos, who went to his aid and engaged in a gunfight with Kanaan. He shot Kanaan in both legs, buttocks and right wrist. This subsequently confined Kanaan to a wheelchair until his wounds healed. Whilst shooting at Fotopoulos, Kanaan accidentally shot himself in the foot.

== Arrest, trials and sentencing ==
On 2 June 1999, Kanaan held a 32-hour siege before surrendering peacefully to police.

On 17 September 1999, Kanaan was arrested in relation to the Five Dock murders and the murder of Karam.

On 29 November 1999, Magistrate Pat O'Shane discharged Kanaan from standing trial in relation to the White City shooting. Ms O'Shane called the two police officers "stupid, reckless and foolhardy" and said that "the circumstances in which constables Patrech and Fotopoulos became involved with...Kanaan and his cohorts...indicated police harassment of youth" and there was "not a shred of evidence which gives rise to any factual or reasonable cause on the part of these police to chase these young fellows on this particular night." The Director of Public Prosecutions was not impressed and ordered that Kanaan stand trial on the basis of an ex-officio indictment.

On 18 October 2000, the White City trial was aborted after two jurors indicated they may be associated with parties involved in the trial.

On 26 February 2001, Kanaan's Five Dock trial was aborted as a result of an article in The Sydney Morning Herald the previous day.

On 8 August 2001, a Supreme Court jury convicted Kanaan in relation to the Five Dock murders.

On 31 October 2001, Supreme Court Justice Greg James sentenced Kanaan to two terms of life imprisonment plus 25 years imprisonment in relation to the malicious wounding of Singleton, with no non-parole period set. Notably, all three sentences were the maximum possible sentences for the relevant offences. Justice James noted that "I am firmly of the view that, having regard to the multiplicity of the offences, the two killings, in the context of the wounding of Mr Singleton, and also the total culpability of the offender for the three offences, the sentence of life imprisonment for each of the murders is the only appropriate sentence".

On 6 June 2002, a Supreme Court jury convicted Kanaan, along with Mawas and El-Assaad in relation to the murder of Karam.

On 29 August 2002, Supreme Court Justice James Wood sentenced Kanaan to life imprisonment in relation to the murder of Karam. Mawas was sentenced to 25 years imprisonment with a non-parole period of 19 years. El-Assaad was sentenced to 24 years imprisonment with a non-parole period of 18 years (on 13 April 2006 the Court of Criminal Appeal reduced the sentence to 22 years imprisonment with a non-parole period of 16 years 6 months).

On 18 December 2002, Supreme Court Justice Robert Hulme sentenced Kanaan in relation to being an accessory after the fact to the malicious wounding of Edward Lee (having pleaded guilty). He was sentenced to 3 years 4 months imprisonment with a non-parole period of 2 years, as was Mohamed Dib. Refai was sentenced to 2 years imprisonment, fully suspended.

The second White City trial began in July 2003 but after the jury were unable to reach a verdict it was discharged.

In November 2004, the 3rd White City trial commenced. It was also aborted.

In February 2005, Kanaan appealed against his murder convictions and sentences.

On 17 November 2005, the Court of Criminal Appeal rejected Kanaan's appeal in relation to the Five Dock murders.

On 13 April 2006, the Court of Criminal Appeal rejected Kanaan's appeal in relation to the murder of Karam.

On 29 May 2006, Kanaan was finally convicted by a Supreme Court jury in relation to the White City shooting, although the charges had by now been downgraded from attempted murder to that of malicious wounding with intent. On 31 May 2006, Supreme Court Justice Megan Latham sentenced Kanaan to 12 years imprisonment with a non-parole period of 7 years, noting that "the threat to public safety and public order represented by these offences was of the highest order".

On 15 February 2007, a District Court jury convicted Kanaan and Jamal in relation to the Greenacre shooting.

On 27 July 2007, District Court judge Stephen Norrish sentenced Kanaan to 10 years imprisonment in relation to the Greenacre shooting.

On 3 August 2007, Kanaan applied to the High Court of Australia for special leave to appeal in relation to the Five Dock and Karam murders. The applications were dismissed.

== Prison ==
Kanaan is in the maximum security Goulburn Jail.

In late 2002, Kanaan was caught setting up a payroll system for fellow inmates.
