= Closed for Winter =

- Promotional film poster
- Directed by: James Bogle
- Written by: James Bogle
- Produced by: Rosemary Blight; Ben Grant; Kent Smith
- Starring: Natalie Imbruglia; Daniel Frederiksen; Deborah Kennedy; Tony Martin; Danielle Catanzariti; Tiahn Green; Sophie Ross
- Cinematography: Kim Batterham
- Distributed by: Omnilab Media
- Release date: 23 April 2009
- Running time: 85 minutes
- Country: Australia
- Language: English
- Box office: A$53,370

Closed for Winter is a 2009 Australian drama film starring Natalie Imbruglia.

It is based on Georgia Blain's critically acclaimed novel of the same title. The film was directed by James Bogle and produced by Goalpost Pictures.

== Cast ==
- Natalie Imbruglia as Elise
- Daniel Frederiksen as Martin
- Deborah Kennedy as Dorothy
- Tony Martin as John Mills
- Danielle Catanzariti as Frances
- Tiahn Green
- Sophie Ross

== Synopsis ==
The film depicts the emotional and poetic story of a beautiful young woman, Elise, who is haunted by a tragic event in her youth. As she attempts to piece together the mystery of her sister's disappearance at the beach 20 years earlier when both were children, Elise must face dark family secrets that have remained unspoken. As the past is revealed, she at last finds the courage to begin to live.

== Release ==
The film premiered at the Adelaide International Film Festival on 27 February 2009. On 23 April 2009, it received a theatrical release at select cinemas in Melbourne, Sydney, Perth and Noosa.

== Reception ==
The film has garnered a generally positive critical reception. The Adelaide Film Festival reviewer praised Imbruglia's "impressive" performance and continued to state that "The beach and the missing child are both motifs which have a powerful place in Australian culture as well as having a particularly local resonance."

The Australian described the film as "compelling" and praised the performances of Imbruglia and Green. The cinematography of Kim Batterham was also praised. The reviewer expressed that the screenplay should have broadened its emotional range.

ABC Australia gave the film three stars and praised Imbruglia's and Green's performances. The reviewer was also enthusiastic about Batterham's cinematography but expressed regret at some of the casting.

The Sydney Morning Herald also gave the film three stars. The reviewer remarked on Imbruglia's "impressive" performance.

Variety agreed with several previous reviewers, praising Imbruglia's performance—"Believably expressing what it must be like to live with ungovernable sorrow, the actress proves to have much more than just a face the camera adores"—as well as that of other cast members: "Younger cast members also impress." The reviewer, however, craved greater dialogue and did not feel that Elise (Imbruglia) and co-worker Martin (Frederiksen) were a believable couple. The reviewer concluded with exemplary comments on the technical aspects of the film, describing it as "first class", and going on to say, "Kim Batterham's striking widescreen imagery casts a warm glow over the youthful summer flashbacks, with tighter, cooler framing for Elise's troubled present. Rita Zanchetta's outstanding production design features Dorothy's house as a time-frozen mausoleum of anguish that creaks and groans with what seems to be its own shallow breath."

== Box office ==
Closed For Winter grossed $53,370 at the box office in Australia.

== See also ==
- Cinema of Australia
