= Cherie Nowlan =

Australian film and television director

- Born: Singleton, New South Wales, Australia
- Occupation: Director
- Years active: 1995–present

Cherie Nowlan (born Singleton, New South Wales, Australia) is an Australian film and television director, best known for the 2007 film Clubland (a.k.a. Introducing the Dwights) and the 1997 film Thank God He Met Lizzie, starring Cate Blanchett and Frances O'Connor, her feature film directorial debut.

== Career ==
Nowlan grew up in the country town of Singleton, Australia, and after working briefly as a journalist began a career in film and television. She worked as a production assistant, researcher and writer for various independent production companies, including Kennedy Miller, as well as in commercial television.

Nowlan's first film was a documentary entitled God's Girls (1991), about the nuns who taught in her former high school. The film won the Best Documentary prize at the Australian Film Institute Awards. The ABC/BBC co-production was described by The Guardian in the UK as 'much more gripping than the fictional Brides of Christ '. It was nominated for an Australian Film Institute Award and was a finalist in the Sydney Film Festival's Dendy Short Film Competition.

Nowlan studied scriptwriting at the Australian Film Television and Radio School in 1993.

Clubland, which starred Oscar nominee Brenda Blethyn and rising star Emma Booth, sold to Warner Independent Pictures for $4.1 million, after debuting at Sundance Film Festival. The film generated standing ovations at Sundance, and was nominated for eleven AFI awards, including Best Director and Best Actress.

In 1995, she wrote and directed the short film Lucinda 31, which was screened in film festivals in New York City and Brisbane, where it was voted Most Popular Film at the 1995 Brisbane Exposure Festival. The script was an adaptation of a short story by Alexandra Long.

She has also had a career in television, directing episodes of The Secret Life of Us, All Saints, Dance Academy, Packed to the Rafters and the American series Life Unexpected and 90210. As well as the television films Marking Time (2003), Small Claims (2004), The Alice (2005), Small Claims: White Wedding (2007), Underbelly Files: The Man Who Got Away (2011) and Underbelly: Razor (2011).

== Filmography ==
=== Film ===
Year	Title	Note
1991	God's Girls	
1992	Everyman	
1995	Lucinda 31	Short film
1997	Thank God He Met Lizzie	
2004	Small Claims	
2005	Small Claims: White Wedding	
2007	Introducing the Dwights (aka) Clubland	
2013	Murder in Manhattan	
2013	Underbelly Files: The Man Who Got Away	

=== Television ===
Year	Title	Note
2002	The Secret Life of Us	2 episodes
2003	Marking Time	Miniseries
2008–2009	All Saints	2 episodes
2009–2010	Packed to the Rafters	6 episodes
2010	Life Unexpected	Episode: "Thanks Ungiven"
2010	Dance Academy	8 episodes
2011	Gossip Girl	Episode: "All the Pretty Sources"
2011	Underbelly: Razor	2 episodes
2011	Crownies	2 episodes
2011–2013	90210	4 episodes
2013	Grey's Anatomy	2 episodes
2013	Mistresses	2 episodes
2014, 2016–2017	Suits	5 episodes
2014	Rake	2 episodes
2015	The Messengers	Episode: "Path to Paradise"
2015–2016	The Mysteries of Laura	4 episodes
2017–2019	How to Get Away with Murder	4 episodes
2017–2019	Animal Kingdom	3 episodes
2017	Dynasty	Episode: "Company Slut"
2018	The Good Doctor	Episode: "Islands Part Two"
2018	Riverdale	Episode: "Chapter Thirty-Four: Judgment Night"
2018–2019	Instinct	2 episodes
2018	Claws	Episode: "Crossroads"
2018–2022	The Rookie	2 episodes
2019	Reprisal	2 episodes
2019	You	Episode: "Have a Good Wellkend, Joe!"
2020	Outer Banks	2 episodes
2020	Helstrom	Episode: "Underneath"
2020	The Wilds	Episode: "Day Six"
2021, 2023–2024	La Brea	5 episodes
2022	Young Rock	3 episodes
2022	The Rookie: Feds	Episode: "Countdown"
2025-2026	Chicago Med	3 episodes
2025	The Irrational	Episode: "Conversation Games"
2025	The Survivors	3 episodes
2026	NCIS: New York	Episode: "Homecoming"
