= Dorothy Porter =

Australian poet

- Born: Dorothy Featherstone Porter; 26 March 1954; Sydney, New South Wales, Australia
- Died: 10 December 2008 (aged 54); Melbourne, Victoria, Australia
- Education: Queenwood School for Girls, University of Sydney
- Occupation: Poet

Dorothy Featherstone Porter (26 March 1954 – 10 December 2008) was an Australian poet. She was a recipient of the Christopher Brennan Award for lifetime achievement in poetry.

== Early life ==
Porter was born in Sydney. Her father was barrister Chester Porter and her mother, Jean, was a high school chemistry teacher. Porter attended the Queenwood School for Girls. She graduated from the University of Sydney in 1975 with a Bachelor of Arts majoring in English and History.

== Works and awards ==
Porter's awards include The Age Book of the Year for poetry, the National Book Council Award for The Monkey's Mask and the FAW Christopher Brennan Award for poetry. Two of her verse novels were shortlisted for the Miles Franklin Award: What a Piece of Work in 2000 and Wild Surmise in 2003. In 2000, the film The Monkey's Mask was made from her verse novel of the same name. In 2005, her libretto The Eternity Man, co-written with composer Jonathan Mills, was performed at the Sydney Festival.

Porter's last book published during her life was El Dorado, her fifth verse novel, about a serial child killer. The book was nominated for several awards including the inaugural Prime Minister's Literary Award in 2007 and for Best Fiction in the Ned Kelly Awards.

Two other works have been published posthumously: her poetry collection The Bee Hut (2009), as well as has her final completed work, an essay on literary criticism and emotions, entitled On Passion.

Porter, who found many outlets for writing, including fiction for young adults and libretti for chamber operas, was working on a rock opera called January with Tim Finn at the time of her death.

== Personal life ==
Porter was an open lesbian and in 1993 moved to Melbourne to be with her partner, fellow writer Andrea Goldsmith. The couple were coincidentally both shortlisted in the 2003 Miles Franklin Award for literature. In 2009, Porter was posthumously recognised by the website Samesame.com.au as one of the most influential gay and lesbian Australians.

Porter was a self-described pagan, committed to pagan principles of courage, stoicism and commitment to the earth and beauty.

== Death ==
Porter had been suffering from breast cancer for four years before her death, but "many thought she was winning the battle," according to journalist Matt Buchanan. In the last three weeks of her life, she became very sick and was admitted to hospital, where she was in intensive care for the final 10 days. She died aged 54 on 10 December 2008.

On 21 February 2010, actress Cate Blanchett read excerpts from Porter's posthumously published short work on literary criticism and emotions in literature, On Passion, at the Malthouse Theatre, Melbourne.

Brett Dean dedicated the first movement of his "Epitaphs for string quintet (viola quintet) (2010)" in memory of Dorothy Porter.

== Bibliography ==
Poetry collections

- Little Hoodlum (1975)
- Bison (1979)
- The Night Parrot (1984)
- Driving Too Fast (1989)
- Crete (1996)
- Other Worlds: Poems 1997–2001 (2001)
- Poems January–August 2004 (2004)
- The Bee Hut (2009, Posthumous)
- Love Poems (2010, Posthumous)

Libretti (with composer Jonathan Mills)

- The Ghost Wife (2000)
- The Eternity Man (2005)

Verse novels

- Akhenaten (1992)
- The Monkey's Mask (1994)
- What a Piece of Work (1999)
- Wild Surmise (2002)
- El Dorado (2007)

Fiction for young adults

- Rookwood (1991)
- The Witch Number (1993)

Lyrics

- Before Time Could Change Us (2005), music by Paul Grabowsky, performed by the Paul Grabowsky/Katie Noonan Quintet

Literary criticism

- On Passion (2010, posthumous)
