= Forever Lulu (2000 film) =

- Directed by: John Kaye
- Written by: John Kaye
- Produced by: Boaz Davidson; Abra Edelman; Diane Isaacs; John Thompson
- Starring: Melanie Griffith; Penelope Ann Miller; Patrick Swayze
- Cinematography: Dion Beebe
- Edited by: Alain Jakubowicz
- Music by: Serge Colbert
- Distributed by: Artisan Entertainment
- Release date: July 7, 2000
- Running time: 99 minutes
- Countries: Germany; United States
- Language: English

Forever Lulu (also known as Along for the Ride) is a 2000 American romantic comedy film directed by John Kaye, and starring Melanie Griffith, Penelope Ann Miller, and Patrick Swayze.

== Plot ==
Ben and Lulu were one time college sweethearts who shared an intense passionate affair that circled around Lulu's untreated mental health condition, a condition which eventually leads to her hospitalisation and their separation.

Now Ben is a successful professional writer in a personally distant relationship with his wife Claire. Lulu leaves her treatment facility and seeks out a reluctant Ben to reveal that fifteen years ago they had a child whom she placed in adoption. Determined to meet him on his fifteenth birthday, Lulu asks Ben to join her on a cross country road trip to find their son. Bound at first by his need to protect Lulu from herself, Ben's uncertainty about the free-spirited Lulu is replaced with tender memories of their love affair and her vulnerable health.

As they journey, Ben's current life is shared through Claire, who has flown out to intercept the pair. Tensions between the three culminate with Claire telling Lulu about Ben and Claire's son who died the year before. A shaken Lulu calls to Ben, with Claire present, to open up about his son who died and the son they are about to meet. All three characters connect, and in the process, Ben rediscovers his heart.

== Cast ==
- Melanie Griffith as Lulu McAfee
- Penelope Ann Miller as Claire Clifton
- Patrick Swayze as Ben Clifton
- Joseph Gordon-Levitt as Martin Ellsworth
- Richard Schiff as Jerome Ellsworth
- Annie Corley as Millie Ellsworth
- Lee Garlington as Linda Davis
- Michael J. Pollard as Hippie
- Ryan Bollman as Freddie
