= Emma Booth (actress) =

Australian model and actress

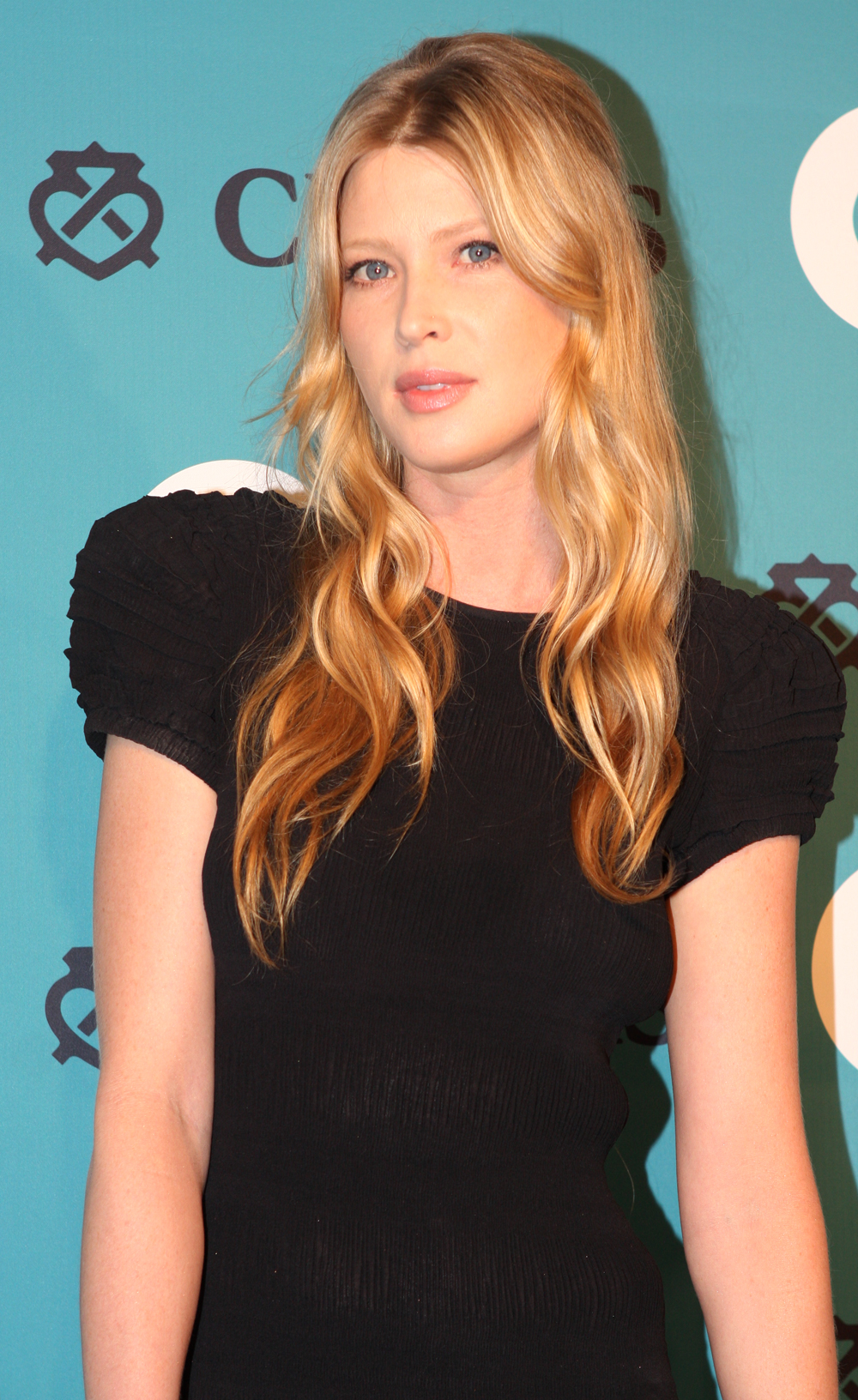
- Booth at the AACTA Awards in 2012
- Born: 28 November 1982 (age 43); Denmark, Western Australia, Australia
- Occupations: Actress; model
- Years active: 1996–present
- Spouse: Dominick Joseph Luna (m. 2013)

Emma Booth (born 28 November 1982) is an Australian actress and model from Perth, Western Australia. The former teen model and TV actress played a significant role in the film Clubland (2007).

== Television and film career ==
After Clubland was screened at the Sundance Film Festival, many talent agencies solicited Booth for roles in upcoming films.

Booth appeared in the 2009 horror film Blood Creek, directed by Joel Schumacher. She worked on the unreleased 2007 production Hippie Hippie Shake, an account of the Schoolkids OZ obscenity trials in the United Kingdom. In 2010, she appeared in Underbelly: The Golden Mile and had a supporting role in the 2013 Parker. In 2017, she appeared in Hounds of Love, as the partner of a serial killer.

In July 2017, Booth joined the hit ABC series Once Upon A Time in a recurring role for its rebooted season seven. She played the main antagonist, Mother Gothel, a powerful witch who is the leader of the Coven of the Eight.

== Modelling career ==
At thirteen, Booth was cast in The Adventures of the Bush Patrol, and at fourteen became a finalist in Girlfriend magazine's cover girl competition. By fifteen, Booth had modelled in Tokyo, Milan, Paris and New York. She later held the title of Western Australia's Model of the Year and Face of Fashion Week, for Sydney and Melbourne.

== Personal life ==
In March 2015, Booth stated on Instagram that she had married musician Dominick Joseph Luna in 2013 in Las Vegas, Nevada.

== Filmography ==
=== Film ===
Year	Title	Role	Notes
2006	Alex's Party	Christie	Short
2007	Hippie Hippie Shake	Germaine Greer	Unreleased
2007	Introducing the Dwights	Jill	AACTA Award for Best Actress in a Supporting Role; FCCA Award for Best Actress – Supporting Role
2009	The Boys Are Back	Laura	
2009	Blood Creek	Liese Wollner	
2010	Pelican Blood	Stevie	
2011	Swerve	Jina	
2013	Parker	Claire	
2013	Scene 16	India	Short
2013	Tracks	Marg	
2014	Tango Underpants	Carolyn	Short
2016	Gods of Egypt	Nephthys	
2016	Hounds of Love	Evelyn White	AACTA Award for Best Actress in a Leading Role; Brussels Film Festival (BRFF) Grand Prix for Best Actress
2018	Extinction	Samantha	
2019	H is for Happiness	Claire Phee	
2020	Proxy	Victoria	Short
2023	Where All Light Tends to Go	Josephine	

=== Television ===
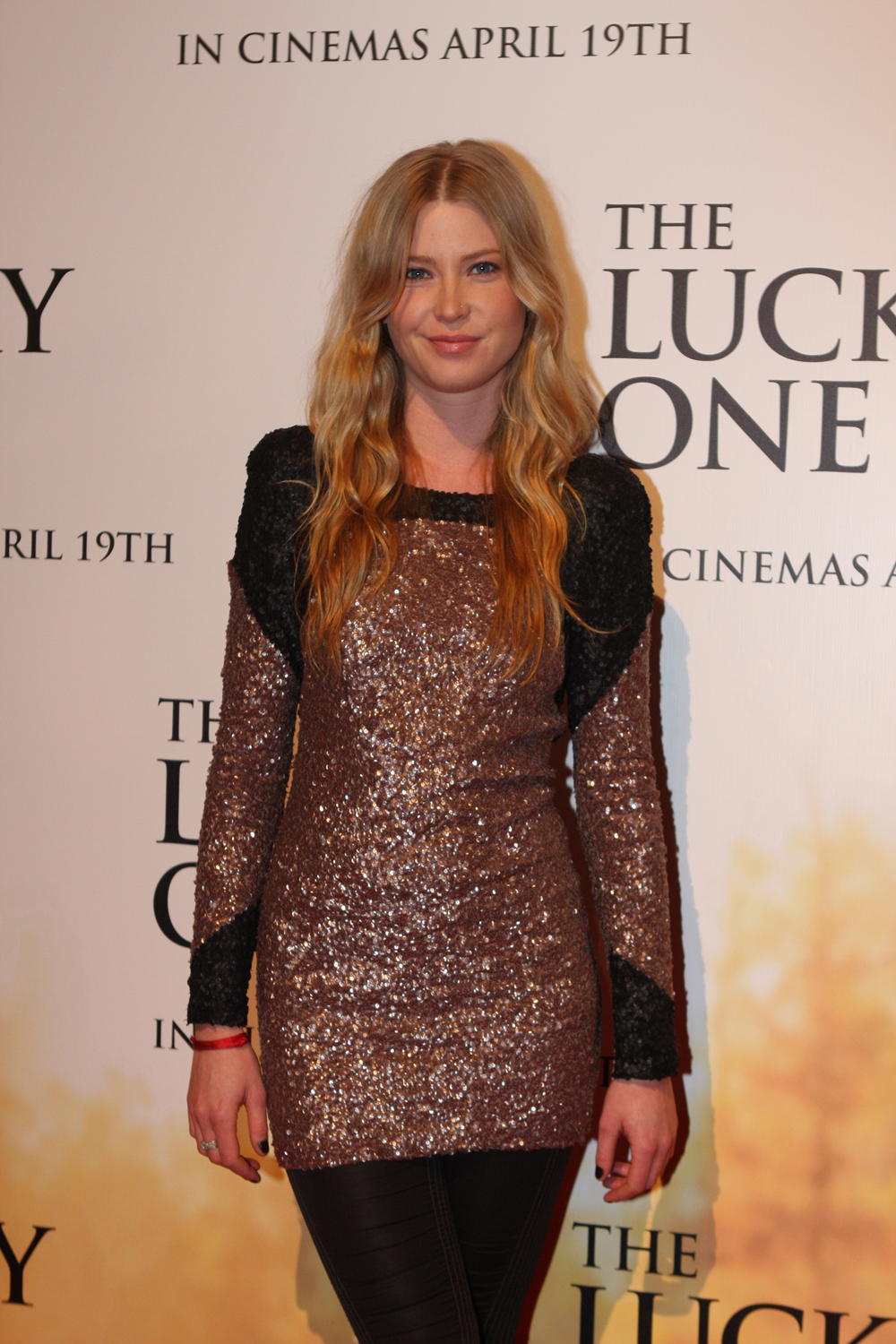
Booth at the world premiere of The Lucky One, 2012.

Year	Title	Role	Notes
1996–97	The Adventures of the Bush Patrol	Dana Drysdale	Recurring role
2003	The Shark Net	Roberta Ainslie	TV miniseries
2006	Small Claims: The Reunion	Annie	TV film
2007	All Saints	Ruby Sparrow	Episodes: "Smoke and Mirrors", "Back on Track"
2007	The Circuit	Nicola	TV miniseries
2009	3 Acts of Murder	Sarah Corbett	TV film
2010	Underbelly: The Golden Mile	Kim Hollingsworth	Main role
2011	Cloudstreet	Rose Pickles	TV miniseries
2012	Jack Irish: Bad Debts	Isabel Irish	TV film
2013	Gothica	Madeline Usher	TV film
2014	Jack Irish: Dead Point	Isabel Irish	TV film
2015–19	Glitch	Kate Willis	Main role
2017–2018	Once Upon a Time	Mother Gothel/Eloise Gardener	Recurring role (season 7)
2020	The Gloaming	Molly McGee	Main Role
2021	Jack Irish	Isabel Irish	3 episodes
2023	Paper Dolls	Margot Murray	8 episodes
