= Unjoo Moon =

Australian film director

- Moon in 2026
- Born: Daegu, South Korea
- Education: University of New South Wales, Australian Film and Television School, American Film Institute
- Occupations: Film director, producer
- Notable work: I Am Woman; The Zen of Bennett
- Spouse: Dion Beebe
- Children: 1

Korean name
- Hangul: 문은주
- RR: Mun Eunju
- MR: Mun Ŭnju

Unjoo Moon is a South Korean-born Australian film director and producer. She is best known for directing the documentary The Zen of Bennett (2012) and the Helen Reddy biopic I Am Woman (2019), the latter of which earned her an AACTA Award nomination for Best Film.

She is married to cinematographer Dion Beebe.

== Early life and education ==
She was born in Daegu, South Korea and her father Moon Don Seuk was the former leader for the association of Korean Australians. After she arrived in Australia at the age of 4, she was raised in Sydney. Moon studied Arts/Law at the University of New South Wales before working at the Australian Broadcasting Corporation as a TV and print journalist including working on the ABC magazine style television show Edge of the Wedge She left journalism to study film at the Australian Film and Television and Radio School, winning the Kenneth B. Myer award and meeting her partner, Oscar-winning cinematographer Dion Beebe. Together they moved to Los Angeles, where Moon attended the American Film Institute, graduating with a Master of Fine Arts and receiving the Franklin J Schaffner Directing Award.

== Career ==
Moon directed The Zen of Bennett, a 2012 documentary on jazz singer Tony Bennett, produced by Bennett's son Danny and Jennifer Lebeau. The New York Times described it as "a tender, touching documentary portrait”.

After the 2017 Las Vegas shooting, she worked with spoken word artist In-Q on a public service video about gun violence.

In October 2021, Moon was tapped to direct Frankly in Love, an adaptation of David Yoon's debut novel of the same name.

=== I Am Woman (2020) ===
I Am Woman, the film, is named after Australian singer Helen Reddy's most famous song, "I Am Woman", which became a feminist anthem during the rise of the women's movement in the 1970s. It follows Reddy from her arrival in New York in 1966, through her friendship with rock writer Lillian Roxon and her troubled marriage to manager Jeff Wald. Moon met Reddy at a "G'Day Australia" event in Los Angeles in 2013, and was surprised to find that her personal story, so entwined with the women's rights movement in the US, had never been told.

Moon told a journalist: "Growing up I remember a time when my mother and her friends – these bright, intelligent, and vibrant women – would roll down the windows of their Volvo station wagons, let down their hair, and sing really loudly when Helen Reddy’s song, I Am Woman, was on the radio. I have this very strong memory of watching how that song transformed women, and the lyrics stayed with me as they do with most people". She showed the finished film to Reddy before it was locked off, and Reddy sang along to her songs while watching, and cried.

Moon said that the movie has particular relevance now, in the #metoo era as women's rights have returned to the fore.

=== Selected filmography ===
- 2017 The Wrong Side of History: Gun Violence
- 2012 The Zen of Bennett
- 2011 Tony Bennett & Amy Winehouse: Body and Soul
- 1998 Sorrow's Child
- 1993 Deadlock
- 1991 Two Fish; Black Sorrow; Flitters; Azzadine

== Awards ==
- 2020 Athena Breakthrough Award
- Kenneth B. Myer award
- 1999 Best Short Film; Shorts International Film festival
