= Clubland (2007 film) =

- Theatrical poster
- Directed by: Cherie Nowlan
- Written by: Keith Thompson
- Produced by: Tristan Whalley; Rosemary Blight
- Starring: Khan Chittenden; Emma Booth; Richard Wilson; Brenda Blethyn
- Cinematography: Mark Wareham
- Edited by: Scott Gray
- Music by: Daniel Denholm
- Release date: 28 June 2007
- Running time: 105 minutes
- Country: Australia
- Language: English

Clubland, internationally known as Introducing the Dwights, is a 2007 Australian comedy-drama film, directed by Cherie Nowlan, written by Keith Thompson, and starring Oscar nominee Brenda Blethyn and Emma Booth. The film was nominated for eleven AFI awards, winning the award for best supporting actress for Emma Booth. It sold to Warner Independent Pictures for $4.1 million, after debuting at Sundance Film Festival, where it gained standing ovations. The film opened in the U.S. on 4 July holiday weekend, the first Australian film ever to do so.

== Plot ==
Life for shy 21-year-old Tim Maitland is not always smooth sailing. His mum Jean is a cafeteria worker by day who hits the comedy club circuit by night, while his dad John is busy trying to recapture his fifteen minutes of fame from when he was a country and western singer back in 1975. But when the feisty beautiful Jill walks into Tim's life, things seem to be looking up. Unfortunately, there's another woman in Tim's life, one who will stand between him and the perfect romance: his mother.

== Cast ==
- Brenda Blethyn as Jean Dwight
- Khan Chittenden as Tim Maitland
- Emma Booth as Jill
- Richard Wilson as Mark
- Philip Quast as Ronnie Stubbs
- Frankie J. Holden as John Maitland
- Rebecca Gibney as Lana
- Katie Wall as Kelly
- Russell Dykstra as Shane

== Box office ==
Clubland grossed $1.5 million at the box office in Australia.

== See also ==
- Cinema of Australia
