= The Eternity Man =

2003 opera by Jonathan Mills

The Eternity Man is a chamber opera in one act and seven scenes by the Australian composer Jonathan Mills to a libretto by Dorothy Porter. It deals with the life of Arthur Stace who was known as "The Eternity Man" because he chalked the word "Eternity" about 500,000 times in over 35 years on Sydney's walls and footpaths.

The opera is written for four voices. These include the voice of Stace himself (baritone) and three female characters (soprano, mezzo-soprano, contralto) who represent alternatively Stace's sister, Myrtle; a Darlinghurst brothel keeper; and an assortment of female choruses – female freaks at the Sydney Royal Easter Show and also ghosts of female convicts and a gaggle of Kings Cross drag queens. A performance lasts for about 70 minutes.

== Performance history ==
The work was commissioned by and premiered at London's Almeida Theatre on 23 July 2003, conducted by Stuart Stratford, production by Benedict Andrews, with singers Richard Jackson, Tara Harrison, Claire McCaldin and Andee-Louise Hippolite. The work had one Australian season, at the Sydney Festival in January 2005. That performance at the Sydney Opera House Studio, conducted by Richard Gill included the singers Grant Smith, Christa Hughes, Belinda Montgomery, Inara Molinari.

== Film adaptation ==
In 2008 director Julien Temple adapted the work into a 64-minute film with funding from the ABC and Britain's Channel 4. It was first shown in June 2008 at the Sydney Film Festival, subsequently at film festivals in Melbourne, Locarno, Athens, Cologne, Vancouver, Warsaw, Mar del Plata. In 2008 it won the ATOM Award for Best Experimental Film, the Gold Cinematography Award and the Judges Award for Best Work of the Year at the Queensland Australian Cinematography Awards. It was also named the Best Performing Arts program at the international 2009 Rose d'Or. The film screened on the ABC on 18 January 2009. The cast includes Grant Doyle and Christa Hughes.
