= John Kaye (screenwriter) =

American screenwriter and film director

John Kaye (born August 31, 1941) is an American screenwriter, novelist and playwright. His feature credits as a screenwriter include American Hot Wax, Rafferty and the Gold Dust Twins and Where the Buffalo Roam. He also directed the feature film Forever Lulu, starring Melanie Griffith and Patrick Swayze. His novels Stars Screaming (1997) and The Dead Circus (2002) were published by the Atlantic Monthly/Grove Press. A graduate of U.C. Berkeley, Kaye was producer and writer of The Lohman and Barkley Show, a late-nite live, 90 minute, satirical show that ran for a year on KNBC, the NBC affiliate in Los Angeles in 1971. A precursor to Saturday Night Live, Kaye gave Barry Levinson, Craig T. Nelson, John Amos, and McLean Stevenson their first jobs in the entertainment business. In 2012, The Los Angeles Review of Books began publishing his memoirs.
