= Ben Grant (film producer) =

Australian film producer

Ben Grant is an Australian film producer. His films include Closed for Winter starring Natalie Imbruglia and Clubland (AKA Introducing the Dwights). He is an executive producer of the musical film The Sapphires, which was released in late 2012, and stars Jessica Mauboy and Deborah Mailman. He was nominated for the AACTA award for best telefeature in 2004, along with Kylie Du Fresne, and Rosemary Blight for Small Claims.
