= Grant Doyle (baritone) =

Australian-British operatic baritone (born 1971)

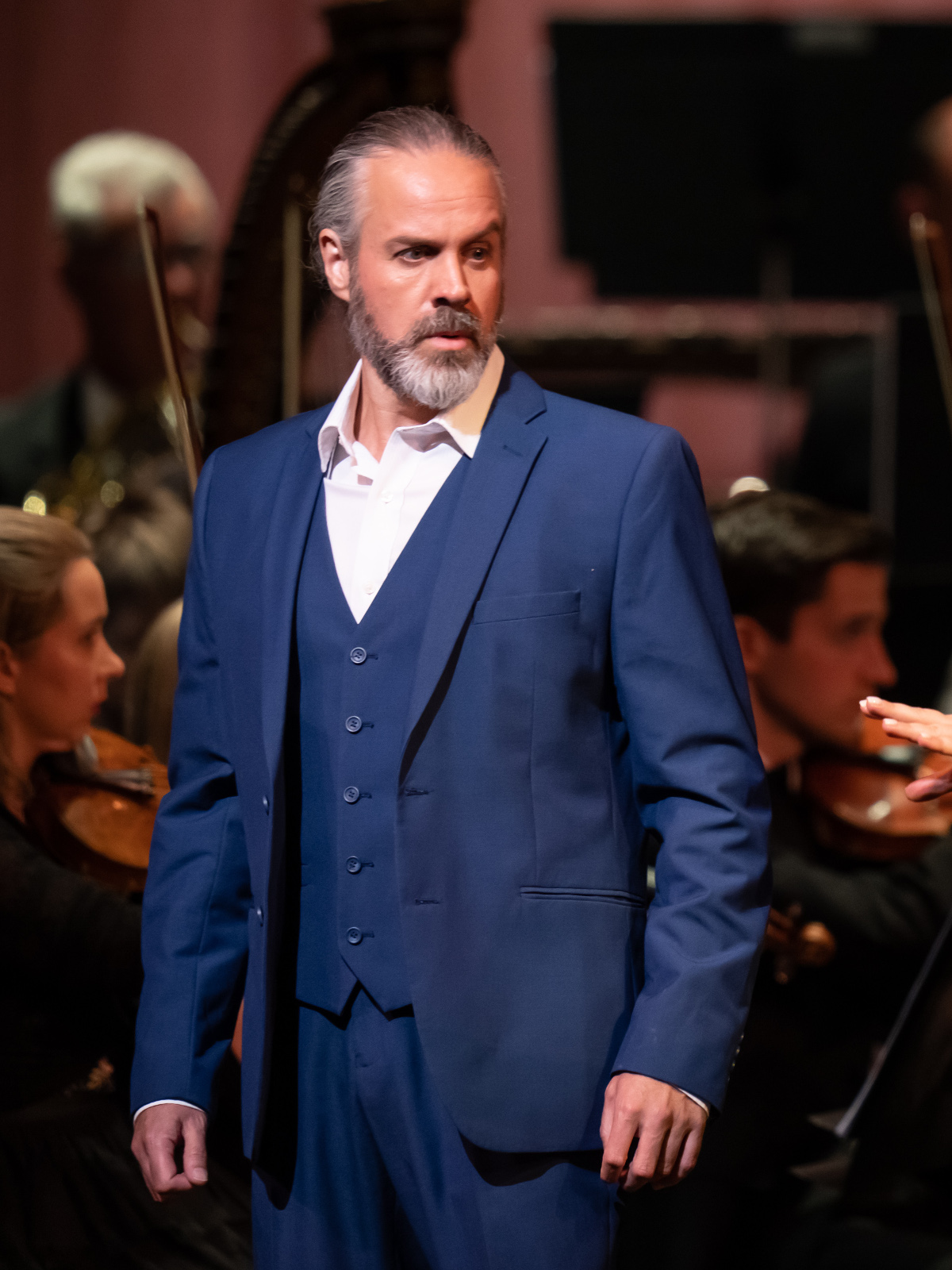

Background information
- Born: Grant William Doyle; 1971 (age 54–55); Adelaide, South Australia
- Origin: Adelaide, South Australia, Australia
- Genres: Classical opera
- Occupation: Baritone classical singer
- Years active: 1994–present
- Website: grantdoyle.com

Grant Doyle (born 1971) is an Australian/British operatic baritone.

== Biography ==
Born in Adelaide, Doyle studied voice at the Elder Conservatorium and then the Opera School at the Royal College of Music in London, subsequently winning a place on the Jette Parker Young Artists Programme at The Royal Opera, London.

His roles for the Royal Opera include Ping Turandot, Small Prisoner/Čekunov From the House of the Dead, El Dancairo Carmen, Apprentice Wozzeck, Tarquinius The Rape of Lucretia, Harlequin Ariadne auf Naxos, Schaunard La bohème, Demetrius A Midsummers Night's Dream, Marullo Rigoletto and Billy Wayne Smith in the world premiere of Mark Anthony Turnage's Anna Nicole.

Opera credits include Forester The Cunning Little Vixen, Robert Iolanta, Zurga Les pêcheurs de perles, Yeletsky Queen of Spades, Marcello La bohème and Fantastic Mr Fox for Opera Holland Park; Al Rocca Un giorno di regno, Forester The Cunning Little Vixen, the title role in Don Giovanni, Count Almaviva Le nozze di Figaro and Enric in the Skating Rink (composer David Sawer and playwright Rory Mullarkey) for Garsington Opera; Demetrius at the Teatro Real in Madrid; Ned Keene Peter Grimes for Teatro Perez Galdos in Gran Canaria as well as Mike in John Adams' I Was Looking at the Ceiling and Then I Saw the Sky for Teatro dell'Opera di Roma. He has appeared with Opera North, starring as Robin Oakapple in their acclaimed Jo Davies production of Gilbert and Sullivan's Ruddigore as well as Sasha Paradise Moscow. He has sung Marcello La bohème for Raymond Gubbay at the Royal Albert Hall and also Schaunard for Glyndebourne Touring Opera. He has sung the title role in The Barber of Seville, Marcello, Hector King Priam, Eduardo L'assedio di Calais, Paolo Simon Boccanegra, Emireno Ottone Oreste Iphigénie en Tauride, Nello Pia de' Tolomei, Verdi's Macbeth and King Dodon The Golden Cockerel for English Touring Opera, as well as creating the role of Abraham in James MacMillan's Clemency directed by Katie Mitchell for ROH2 and revived for Scottish Opera at the 2012 Edinburgh Festival. In 2017 he sang the role of Sir Thomas Bertram in the premiere of the orchestrated version of Jonathon Dove's Mansfield Park for the Grange Festival.

In his native Australia, Grant has sung Don Giovanni, Zurga Les pêcheurs de perles, the Count Le nozze di Figaro and Starbuck in Jake Heggie's Moby-Dick for State Opera of South Australia for which he won a 2012 Helpmann Award for Best Male Performer in a Supporting Role. He sang Orestes in Gluck's Iphigénie en Tauride for Pinchgut Opera in Sydney and Phillip II in the premiere of Isaac Nathan's ballad opera Don John of Austria, recorded for ABC Classics with the Sydney Symphony Orchestra. He made his debut with Opera Queensland in 2017, singing Zurga in Michael Gow's production of Les pêcheurs de perles.

He played the title role in the 2008 Channel 4/ABC film of Jonathan Mills' The Eternity Man, the story of Sydney's legendary Arthur Stace. The film premiered at the Sydney Film Festival and had screenings on ABC TV, Channel 4, Barbican Cinema in London, Locarno Festival and won a Rose d'Or for best Performing Arts Programme in 2009. He also recorded the Forester for the BBC animated film of The Cunning Little Vixen with the Deutsches Symphonie-Orchester Berlin conducted by Kent Nagano as well as taking the role of Carlo in Judith Weir's film opera Armida for Channel 4 TV.

As a concert soloist, Grant has performed Carmina Burana with the Royal Philharmonic, Crouch End Festival Chorus/Barbican, as well as for Raymond Gubbay at the Royal Albert Hall. Other performances include Elijah (Blackheath Halls), Weill's The Seven Deadly Sins (Hallé Orchestra,), Janáček's Glagolitic Mass (Philharmonia at the Brighton Festival), Brahms' Ein deutsches Requiem with the Tasmanian Symphony Orchestra, Britten's War Requiem (Huddersfield Choral Society), Tippett's A Child of Our Time and Vaughan Williams A Sea Symphony (Crouch End Festival Chorus at the Barbican), and Messiah with the Nottingham Harmonic Choir and also with the Royal Choral Society at the Royal Albert Hall.

He appears regularly as a soloist in Raymond Gubbay concerts such as Classical Spectacular and Last Night of the Proms as well as a soloist with Sinfonia Viva including their Darley Park outdoor concerts to audiences of over 30,000.

He holds dual citizenship of Australia and the UK and currently lives in south east London.
