= Chloe Boreham =

Franco-Australian actress

- Born: Chloe Sarah Boreham; Sydney, Australia
- Occupation: Actress
- Years active: 2007–present
- Notable work: The Killing Field

Chloé Boreham is a Franco-Australian actress. She is best known for the leading role as detective Bridget Anderson on the Channel 7 2014 television drama The Killing Field.

== Early life and education ==
Chloé Sarah Boreham was born in Sydney, of a French mother and British father. Growing up, she attended the French school of Sydney.

She completed a bachelor's degree of theatre studies at Melbourne University, before attending Melbourne screen acting school 16th Street Actors Studio, where she studied full-time from 2010 to 2011. Boreham also trained in Paris at the Theatre de Soleil.

== Career ==
Boreham has played leading roles in film, theatre and television in both English and French speaking roles. She played the leading role of Isabelle in Between Me, directed by director Kim Farrant, a half-hour drama developed over eight months which premiered at the St Kilda Short Film Festival. Boreham played a leading role in the short film Gorilla, directed by Tim Marshall, which premiered at the Palm Springs International ShortFest and was awarded the 2013 UK Iris Prize.

Boreham also starred in the sequel to the horror/thriller film Wolf Creek 2 directed by Greg McLean, which premiered at the 2013 Venice Film Festival and the 2013 Paris International Fantastic Film Festival.

In 2014, she played a leading role in the Channel 7 telemovie The Killing Field, alongside Rebecca Gibney, Peter O'Brien, and Liam McIntyre, directed by Samantha Lang.

Boreham played a semi-regular role on the 2015 ABC show series Ready For This, directed by Tony Krawitz and Daina Reid. In 2016, Boreham starred in the short film Messiah, directed by Damian Walshe-Howling.

Her Australian stage credits include Patricia Cornelius' Slut, Martin Crimp's Attempts on Her Life, and Sergi Belbel's Blood.

== Filmography ==
=== Film and TV ===
Year	Title	Role	Notes
2019	Alice	Lisa	French film. Dir : Josephine Mackerras
2016	Messiah(Lead)	Stella	Short Dir: Damian Walshe-Howling
2015	Ready For This	Mrs Melick	TV series Dir: Tony Krawitz, Daina Reid
2014	The Killing Field (Lead)	Det Bridget Anderson	TV movie Dir: Sam Lang
2014	Between Me (Lead)	Isabelle	Featurette Dir: Kim Farrant
2013	Wolf Creek 2	Lucille	Feature Dir: Greg Mclean
2012	Gorilla (Lead)	Anna	Short Dir: Tim Marshall (Awarded 2013 Iris Prize Winner)
2012	The Doctor Blake Mysteries	Sal Clements	TV series Dir: Declan Eames
2012	Offspring (TV series)	Inez	TV series Dir: Elissa Down
2012	Upper Middle Bogan	French Woman	TV series Dir: Wayne Hope
2011	Neighbours	Rhea Thomas	TV series: Dir: Tony Osicka
2011	Thought Tracker (Lead)	Reese	Short Dir: Guilia Bastoni
2010	Slaughtered (Lead)	Jamie	Feature Dir: Kate Glover

=== Theatre ===
Year	Play	Role	Company
2010	Blood (Sergi Belbel)	Young Woman	TheatreWorks, Melbourne
2008	Attempts on her Life (Martin Crimp)	Actress	Union House Theatre
2007	Slut (Patricia Cornelius)	Lolita	FortyFive Downstairs
