= Lucky Break =

Lucky Break may refer to:

- Lucky Break (1994 film), an Australian film
- Lucky Break (2001 film), a British film
