= List of Spartacus (TV series) episodes =

TV series

Spartacus is an American historical epic series created by Steven S. DeKnight, who served as an executive producer alongside Sam Raimi and Rob Tapert. The series tells the story of a Thracian warrior who leads a rebellion against the Roman Republic. Initially the warrior, whose name is not given, agrees to fight alongside the Roman army to help defeat barbarians from a rival tribe, but he returns home to defend his village when a Roman general decides to abandon the warrior's village and ignore the barbarians to pursue glory elsewhere. Captured by the Romans as a deserter, his wife forced into slavery, the warrior is taken to Capua to be put to death by gladiators before the public. Here the warrior proves his worth as a fighter and is sent to the House of Batiatus to be trained as a gladiator, earning the name Spartacus (Batiatus names him after a 'legendary Thracian king'). The series premiered on the Starz Network on January 22, 2010 and aired its final episode on April 12. 2013.

For the first season, the role of Spartacus was played by Andy Whitfield, who was diagnosed with non-Hodgkin's lymphoma at the completion of the first season. Although in June 2010 Whitfield was reported to be healthy and cancer free, in September his cancer returned and he died on 11 September 2011. Australian actor Liam McIntyre took over the role of Spartacus from Season 2. A total of 33 episodes of Spartacus were broadcast over three seasons. A six-part prequel miniseries entitled Spartacus: Gods of the Arena was also broadcast between Seasons 1 and 2 (in 2011).

== Series overview ==
| Season | Title | Episodes | Originally released | |
| Season | Title | Episodes | First released | Last released |
|---|---|---|---|---|
| 1 | Blood and Sand | 13 | January 22, 2010 | April 16, 2010 |
| Prequel | Gods of the Arena | 6 | January 21, 2011 | February 25, 2011 |
| 2 | Vengeance | 10 | January 27, 2012 | March 30, 2012 |
| 3 | War of the Damned | 10 | January 25, 2013 | April 12, 2013 |

== Episodes ==
=== Season 1: Blood and Sand (2010) ===
| No. overall | No. in season | Title | Directed by | Written by | Original release date | Prod. code | US viewers (millions) |
|---|---|---|---|---|---|---|---|
| 1 | 1 | "The Red Serpent" | Rick Jacobson | Steven S. DeKnight | January 22, 2010 | SPS101 | 0.66 |
| 2 | 2 | "Sacramentum Gladiatorum" | Rick Jacobson | Steven S. DeKnight | January 29, 2010 | SPS102 | 0.77 |
| 3 | 3 | "Legends" | Grady Hall | Brent Fletcher | February 5, 2010 | SPS103 | 0.86 |
| 4 | 4 | "The Thing in the Pit" | Jesse Warn | Aaron Helbing & Todd Helbing | February 12, 2010 | SPS104 | 0.66 |
| 5 | 5 | "Shadow Games" | Michael Hurst | Miranda Kwok | February 19, 2010 | SPS105 | 0.85 |
| 6 | 6 | "Delicate Things" | Rick Jacobson | Tracy Bellomo & Andrew Chambliss | February 26, 2010 | SPS106 | 1.08 |
| 7 | 7 | "Great and Unfortunate Things" | Jesse Warn | Brent Fletcher & Steven S. DeKnight | March 12, 2010 | SPS107 | 0.97 |
| 8 | 8 | "Mark of the Brotherhood" | Rowan Woods | Aaron Helbing & Todd Helbing | March 19, 2010 | SPS108 | 0.88 |
| 9 | 9 | "Whore" | Michael Hurst | Daniel Knauf | March 26, 2010 | SPS109 | 1.11 |
| 10 | 10 | "Party Favors" | Chris Martin-Jones | Brent Fletcher & Miranda Kwok | April 2, 2010 | SPS110 | 1.27 |
| 11 | 11 | "Old Wounds" | Glenn Standring | Story by : Dan Filie & Patricia Wells | April 9, 2010 | SPS111 | 1.13 |
| 12 | 12 | "Revelations" | Michael Hurst | Brent Fletcher | April 16, 2010 | SPS112 | 1.29 |
| 13 | 13 | "Kill Them All" | Jesse Warn | Steven S. DeKnight | April 23, 2010 | SPS113 | 1.23 |

=== Prequel Season: Gods of the Arena (2011) ===
| No. | Title | Directed by | Written by | Original release date | US viewers (millions) |
|---|---|---|---|---|---|
| 1 | "Past Transgressions" | Jesse Warn | Steven S. DeKnight | January 21, 2011 | 1.10 |
| 2 | "Missio" | Rick Jacobson | Maurissa Tancharoen & Jed Whedon | January 28, 2011 | 1.14 |
| 3 | "Paterfamilias" | Michael Hurst | Aaron Helbing & Todd Helbing | February 4, 2011 | 1.26 |
| 4 | "Beneath the Mask" | Brendan Maher | Seamus Kevin Fahey & Misha Green | February 11, 2011 | 1.11 |
| 5 | "Reckoning" | John Fawcett | Brent Fletcher | February 18, 2011 | 1.38 |
| 6 | "The Bitter End" | Rick Jacobson | Steven S. DeKnight | February 25, 2011 | 1.72 |

=== Season 2: Vengeance (2012) ===
| No. overall | No. in season | Title | Directed by | Written by | Original release date | Prod. code | US viewers (millions) |
|---|---|---|---|---|---|---|---|
| 14 | 1 | "Fugitivus" | Michael Hurst | Steven S. DeKnight | January 27, 2012 | SPS201 | 1.39 |
| 15 | 2 | "A Place in This World" | Jesse Warn | Brent Fletcher | February 3, 2012 | SPS202 | 1.30 |
| 16 | 3 | "The Greater Good" | Brendan Maher | Tracy Bellomo | February 10, 2012 | SPS203 | 1.40 |
| 17 | 4 | "Empty Hands" | Mark Beesley | Allison Miller | February 17, 2012 | SPS204 | 1.47 |
| 18 | 5 | "Libertus" | Rick Jacobson | Aaron Helbing & Todd Helbing | February 24, 2012 | SPS205 | 1.56 |
| 19 | 6 | "Chosen Path" | Michael Hurst | Misha Green | March 2, 2012 | SPS206 | 1.19 |
| 20 | 7 | "Sacramentum" | Jesse Warn | Seamus Kevin Fahey | March 9, 2012 | SPS207 | 1.25 |
| 21 | 8 | "Balance" | Chris Martin-Jones | Jed Whedon | March 16, 2012 | SPS208 | 1.10 |
| 22 | 9 | "Monsters" | TJ Scott | Brent Fletcher | March 23, 2012 | SPS209 | 1.35 |
| 23 | 10 | "Wrath of the Gods" | Jesse Warn | Steven S. DeKnight | March 30, 2012 | SPS210 | 1.45 |

=== Season 3: War of the Damned (2013) ===
| No. overall | No. in season | Title | Directed by | Written by | Original release date | Prod. code | US viewers (millions) |
|---|---|---|---|---|---|---|---|
| 24 | 1 | "Enemies of Rome" | Mark Beesley | Steven S. DeKnight | January 25, 2013 | SPS301 | 0.93 |
| 25 | 2 | "Wolves at the Gate" | Jesse Warn | Aaron Helbing & Todd Helbing | February 1, 2013 | SPS302 | 0.82 |
| 26 | 3 | "Men of Honor" | John Fawcett | Brent Fletcher | February 8, 2013 | SPS303 | 0.95 |
| 27 | 4 | "Decimation" | Michael Hurst | Seamus Kevin Fahey | February 22, 2013 | SPS304 | 0.88 |
| 28 | 5 | "Blood Brothers" | TJ Scott | Allison Miller | March 1, 2013 | SPS305 | 1.02 |
| 29 | 6 | "Spoils of War" | Mark Beesley | Jed Whedon | March 8, 2013 | SPS306 | 0.87 |
| 30 | 7 | "Mors Indecepta" | Jesse Warn | David Kob & Mark Leitner | March 15, 2013 | SPS307 | 1.09 |
| 31 | 8 | "Separate Paths" | TJ Scott | Brent Fletcher | March 22, 2013 | SPS308 | 1.09 |
| 32 | 9 | "The Dead and the Dying" | Michael Hurst | Jeffrey Bell | April 5, 2013 | SPS309 | 1.07 |
| 33 | 10 | "Victory" | Rick Jacobson | Steven S. DeKnight | April 12, 2013 | SPS310 | 1.42 |

== Home media releases ==
| Season | Episodes | DVD and Blu-ray releases | | |
| Season | Episodes | Region 1 | Region 2 | Region 4 |
|---|---|---|---|---|
| 1 | 13 | September 21, 2010 | May 16, 2011 | December 1, 2010 |
| Prequel | 6 | September 13, 2011 | October 3, 2011 | August 31, 2011 |
| 2 | 10 | September 11, 2012 | October 1, 2012 | August 29, 2012 |
| 3 | 10 | September 3, 2013 | April 29, 2013 | August 28, 2013 |
