= GOW4 =

GoW4 may refer to:

- Gears of War 4, a 2016 video game for the Xbox One and Microsoft Windows
- God of War, a 2018 video game for the PlayStation 4, commonly referred to as God of War 4
