= Winter (Australian TV series) =

Australian TV series

- Created by: Michaeley O'Brien; Sarah Smith
- Directed by: Lynn Hegarty
- Starring: Rebecca Gibney; Peter O'Brien; Matt Nable; Antonia Prebble; Akos Armont; Sara West
- Country of origin: Australia
- Original language: English
- No. of seasons: 1
- No. of episodes: 6

Production
- Executive producers: John Holmes; Julie McGauran
- Producers: Chris Martin-Jones; Rebecca Gibney; Sarah Smith
- Production locations: Sydney, Australia
- Running time: 45 minutes
- Production company: Seven Productions

Original release
- Network: Seven Network
- Release: 4 February – 11 March 2015

Winter is an Australian mystery-drama-thriller television series which premiered on the Seven Network on 4 February 2015, and concluded on 11 March 2015. The series is a spin off of the 2014 telemovie, The Killing Field. It stars Rebecca Gibney and Peter O'Brien reprising their roles from the telemovie.

== Plot ==
In Kings Cross, Sydney, Indiana Hope (Sara West) is a troubled girl who is living in a strip club with her friend and roommate. One night, while crossing the road Indiana is hit by an ongoing car where the car quickly flees the scene and leaves Indiana's unconscious body on the street. Meanwhile, Karly Johansson is chased through her home by an unknown figure who viciously attacks her and pushes her off a cliff to her death below. Her body is found on the rocks by her mother.

Following the successful Mingara murder case, Detective Sergeant Eve Winter (Rebecca Gibney) has taken time off her crime career. After she receives a call, she is sent to Rocky Point, a beautiful seaside fishing town off Sydney where 23-year-old mother Karly Johansson has been murdered. At the scene, Eve meets her husband Luke Thompson (Zac Drayson) who is a fisherman and hysterically breaks down after seeing his dead wife. Eve meets Judith, Karly's mother and sister Lauren (Kate Mulvany). She also meets ambitious Detective Alesia Taylor (Antonia Prebble) who befriends Eve. While there, she reunites with Detective Sergeant Lachlan McKenzie (Peter O'Brien), who has feelings towards Eve. Lachlan suspects that Karly's murder has a connection to a murder case 8 years ago where Paul Paget's wife was found dead on the rocks and he was framed for murder. Eve and Lachlan visit Paget who says that he has nothing to do with it. Paget commits suicide days after which angers Lachlan, believing that he might be the killer.

Eve also hears of Indiana's hit and run accident and rushes to the hospital where she meets Detective Sergeant Jake Harris (Matt Nable) who Eve has a hatred for and also meets her roommate Sharni. That night, Indiana is attacked at the hospital by an unknown figure and escapes.

As the season unfolds, everyone's pasts are revealed. Karly and Indiana were best friends and got a tattoo that means friendship. Karly's dying father Bjorn Johansson (Lewis Fitz-Gerald) had raped Indiana. Indiana's real name is actually Katherine Indiana Hope Ziegler and is the daughter of Peter Ziegler, the Director of Public Prosecutions. Indiana's father kicked her out of home for being a troubled teen and asked a friend in the police to place her with the Johanssons. It is also revealed that Ziegler is not interested in Indiana, his daughter from his first marriage, and more concerned about protecting his public image and new family.

Believing Indiana can help with the case, Eve hires her sister Melanie Winter (Rachel Gordon) who attempts to unlock Indiana's mind using hypnosis, given that Melanie is a child psychiatrist. Indiana runs off after Melanie asks why Karly was crying at the nightclub the night of Indiana's accident and Karly's murder.

Struggling to figure out the killer, they suspect Karly's husband Luke might have been involved so they interrogate him. He reveals that he was out at sea during the night of his wife's murder but they later find out that he is a drug dealer selling cocaine to Emma Lam, who was spotted at Karly's funeral chatting to Luke. Emma is later shot in the head after arguing with Luke by an unknown figure nearby. They all find Luke next to Emma's body and he is framed for murder.

One night while at the strip club, Indiana's attacker enters and threatens to kill her but she escapes and runs away. While chasing Sharni on her scooter she is hit by a car and dies. Eve searches for Indiana and upon finding her tells Indiana that Sharni has died, causing Indiana to fall into a deep depression. Eve looks after Indiana while on the case. Indiana's attacker is killed days after being chased by Detective Milo Lee (Akos Armont) and is thrown from a balcony.

Lachlan is suspicious of his colleague Steve Wheeler (Richard Healy), but while talking to Eve on the phone on the top level of the carpark, Lachlan is shot twice in the back by Steve, who flees from the scene and drops the gun in the river. With Lachlan fighting for his life, two witnesses are interrogated about the night of Lachlan's shooting. They recognize Steve because he pushed them out the way while he was running down the stairs to escape. Steve is fired and arrested afterwards.

While Indiana stays at Eve's place, she reveals that she was raped by Bjorn which was the reason for Karly's breakdown. The media reveals that Peter Ziegler abandoned his daughter. Ziegler retaliates by holding a press conference, claiming that Indiana was a drug addict and that he "did his best." In anger, Indiana escapes Eve's house and travels to her father's house with a gun, confronting him over the fact that he didn't believe her when she told him that Bjorn raped her, for lying to the media and kicking her out of home. Eve discovers Indiana's disappearance and races to the Ziegler's mansion to find a heartbroken yet angry Indiana, who she talks down and takes the gun from. Both disgusted with what Peter has done, Both Eve and his wife, Elizabeth convince Peter not to press charges against Indiana and to post bail for her.

After Indiana is bailed out, both she and Eve travel to Rocky Point and interrogate Lauren who says she knew nothing. While at the Johansson's house, Faith, Karly's daughter appears and reveals that the monster was chasing Mummy before she reveals that the monster was in fact, Lauren.

Eve then interrogates Lauren again at Karly's house and forces her to give up that she in fact killed her sister. Karly was going to reveal that not only did Bjorn rape Indiana, but also he was having an incestuous affair with Lauren, which resulted in Lauren becoming pregnant with her son, Sam. Lauren, fearing what people would think of her, Bjorn and Sam, didn't want her to do it. Eavesdropping, Judith walks into the room heartbroken and the cops later arrest Lauren for murder. Sam is comforted by his legal father, Travis, who was aware Sam was not his son, biologically.

While at court, Eve exits to find Jake standing there, and the two of them leave together to grab a cup of coffee.

== Cast ==
=== Main ===
- Rebecca Gibney as Detective Sergeant Eve Winter
- Peter O'Brien as Detective Inspector Lachlan McKenzie
- Matt Nable as Federal Agent Jake Harris
- Antonia Prebble as Detective Alesia Taylor
- Akos Armont as Detective Milo Lee
- Sara West as Indiana Hope/Katherine Ziegler

=== Recurring ===
- Richard Healy as Steve Wheeler
- Rachel Gordon as Melanie Winter
- Zac Drayson as Luke Thompson
- Tessa Lind as Karly Thompson
- Tara Morice as Judith Johansson
- Lewis Fitz-Gerald as Bjorn Johansson
- Kate Mulvany as Lauren McIntyre
- Jack Finsterer as Paul Paget
- Lindsay Farris as Martin Jenkins
- Dee Smart as Penny Bartok

== Episodes ==
No.	Title	Directed by	Written by	Original release date	Australian viewers (millions)
1	"Skeletons"	Ian Watson	Sarah Smith	4 February 2015	1.31
Detective Sergeant Eve Winter leads the task force assigned to investigate the murder of young 23-year old mother Karly Johansson at Rocky Point, a hauntingly beautiful fishing town south of Sydney. The case is soon complicated when the mysterious Federal Agent Jake Harris joins the investigation, causing tension with Eve.
2	"Gone Girl"	Ian Watson	Michaeley O'Brien	11 February 2015	1.10
Eve is caught between two worlds - solving Karly's murder with Lachlan and her team, and finding Indiana who she is convinced is hiding something. Meanwhile, Eve notices Karly's husband is having suspicious meetings with an attractive stranger and a raid goes horribly wrong.
3	"The Bridge"	Shirley Barrett	Jeff Truman	18 February 2015	0.97
Eve's sister and psychologist Melanie attempts to unlock Indiana's memory via hypnosis. Luke reveals a secret that may lead her one step closer to Karly's killer. Meanwhile, Lachlan's affair with deputy Tammy Davis is on fire, while Eve and Jake move forward at a slow pace.
4	"The Inside Man"	Shirley Barrett	Jeff Truman	25 February 2015	0.95
In the aftermath of the case, Eve and Jake take comfort in each others arms. Eve is called before Professional Standards, where she becomes convinced that there is a leak within the task force.
5	"Blow Up"	Lynn Hegarty	Sarah Smith	4 March 2015	0.80
Knowing there's a leak in the department, Eve keeps Indiana holed up at her place where she learns a shocking secret. Then, Eve is reeling after someone close to her fights for their life.
6	"Back to the Start"	Lynn Hegarty	Michaeley O'Brien	11 March 2015	0.82
Eve takes Indiana back to Rocky Point, hoping she will remember what happened on the fateful day Karly Johansson was murdered. But Indiana's presence sets off a chain of events even Eve could not have predicted.

=== Ratings ===
Episode	Title	Original airdate	Overnight Viewers	Consolidated Viewers	Nightly Rank	Adjusted Rank
1	"Skeletons"	4 February 2015	1.125	1.309	#2	#2
2	"Gone Girl"	11 February 2015	0.918	1.097	#7	#2
3	"The Bridge"	18 February 2015	0.817	0.968	#8	#5
4	"The Inside Man"	25 February 2015	0.731	0.946	#10	#4
5	"Blow Up"	4 March 2015	0.804	0.989	#6	#2
6	"Back to the Start"	11 March 2015	0.819	1.007	#7	#2

- Figures are OzTAM Data for the 5 City Metro areas.
- Overnight – Live broadcast and recordings viewed the same night.
- Consolidated – Live broadcast and recordings viewed within the following seven days.

== Production ==
Filming for the series began in October 2014 and wrapped in January 2015.

The six-part series is produced in-house by Chris Martin-Jones, Rebecca Gibney and Sarah Smith for the Seven Network. It is created by Michaeley O'Brien and Sarah Smith.

=== Syndication ===
The season made its subscription television debut on 13th Street on 31 May 2016.
