= Sea Urchins =

New Zealand TV series (1980–1984)

- Genre: Kidult drama
- Starring: Rebecca Gibney; Robert Rakete
- Country of origin: New Zealand
- Original language: English
- No. of series: 3

Original release
- Network: Television One
- Release: 1980 – 1984

Sea Urchins is a kidult television series (in three series) produced by Television New Zealand from 1980 to 1984. It starred Rebecca Gibney in her first television role, Bruce Allpress, John Bach, Roy Billing and Robert Rakete. Rachel Weston also appeared in series 1.

Described as a saltwater Swallows and Amazons, it was shot on the Mahurangi Harbour near Puhoi in the Hauraki Gulf, where the plucky “urchins” stumble on villainous plots from missing treasure to wildlife smuggling while holidaying with their uncle.

== Cast ==
- Rebecca Gibney as Karen
- Bruce Allpress
- John Bach
- Roy Billing as Sharky
- Robert Rakete
- Rachel Weston as Gabrielle
