= The Killing Field =

2014 Australian thriller television film

- The Killing Field logo
- Written by: Michaeley O'Brien; Sarah Smith
- Directed by: Samantha Lang
- Starring: Rebecca Gibney; Chloe Boreham; Liam McIntyre; Peter O'Brien
- Country of origin: Australia
- Original language: English

Production
- Producers: Bill Hughes; Sarah Smith; Rebecca Gibney
- Cinematography: Toby Oliver
- Running time: 90 minutes

Original release
- Network: Seven Network
- Release: 4 May 2014

The Killing Field is an Australian mystery-drama-thriller television film on the Seven Network. It was created by Sarah Smith and Michaeley O'Brien and directed by Samantha Lang, from a screenplay by Sarah Smith and Michaeley O'Brien. It was produced by Bill Hughes and Sarah Smith with Rebecca Gibney co-producing and Julie McGauran executive producing. A spin-off series Winter screened from February 2015.

== Plot ==
When a young girl goes missing in the small country town of Mingara, a large scale operation is started by the police and residents of the town. However, when the search proves too big for the local authorities after five dead bodies are found, buried in a field in shallow graves, a specialised team of homicide detectives are flown in from the city.

== Cast ==
- Rebecca Gibney as Detective Sergeant Eve Winter
- Chloe Boreham as Constable Bridget Anderson
- Liam McIntyre as Detective Dan Wild
- Peter O'Brien as Inspector Lachlan McKenzie
- Darren Gilshenan as Brian Fleet
- Eamon Farren as Damian Jeffries

== Production ==
The concept was created by Sarah Smith of Cornerstone Pictures and Michaeley O'Brien and the screenplay was written by Sarah Smith and Michaeley O'Brien. It will be directed by Samantha Lang. Bill Hughes is producing for Seven and Sarah Smith is producing for Cornerstone Pictures, with Rebecca Gibney as co-producer. Julie McGauran is executive producer. The movie was shot in November 2013 in New South Wales small town Gulgong and the office setting was shot in Sydney. The casting director Greg Apps cast Rebecca Gibney, Peter O'Brien, Chloe Boreham and Liam McIntyre, for the leading roles of the Task force.

== Release ==
The film debuted on the Seven Network on 4 May 2014. The film was watched by 1.166 million overnight viewers and 1.405 million consolidated viewers.
