= JD Fenix =

Fictional character in Gears of War franchise

- Gears of War character
- In-game render of JD Fenix holding a Gnasher Shotgun, as he appears in Gears of War 4
- First appearance: Gears of War 4 (2016)
- Created by: The Coalition
- Voiced by: Liam McIntyre

In-universe information
- Family: Marcus Fenix (father); Anya Stroud (mother)
- Relatives: Adam Fenix (grandfather); Elain Fenix (grandmother); Helena Stroud (grandmother); Roland Fenix (great-great-grandfather)

James Dominic Fenix, better known as JD Fenix or J.D. Fenix, is a fictional character in the Gears of War franchise. Introduced in Gears of War 4 as the son of Marcus Fenix, JD was positioned as one of the central characters of the newer games alongside his friends, Del Walker and Kait Diaz. Prior to the events of Gears of War 4, he originally held the rank of lieutenant in service of the supranational and intergovernmental military collective known as the Coalition of Ordered Governments ("COG"), and later defected to a loosely organized faction of rebel human settlers who live outside of the COG's walled settlements in the world of Sera. By the events of Gears 5, he has rejoined the COG to fight a new threat to humanity. The character is voiced by Australian actor Liam McIntyre. Outside of the video game series, JD has appeared in the novels Gears of War: Ascendance and Gears of War: Bloodlines.

The concept of JD as a character originated when series creator Epic Games was still in early development for a direct sequel to Gears of Wars 3. The Coalition, a subsidiary of Xbox Game Studios and the current developers responsible for the Gears of War franchise following the departure of Epic Games from the series, intended for JD Fenix to headline a new generation of main characters introduced in Gears of War 4. Although JD was initially presented as the face of the new generation, the development of Gears 5 and critical reception increasingly positioned Kait as the stronger narrative center of the series.

Critical response to JD has been mixed, with commentary focusing on his physical appearance as well as the quality of the writing behind the interactions with his companions and his father. At least one reviewer critiqued JD’s quipping, earnest personality to be out of step with the series’ violent setting, and said The Coalition’s attempt to humanize him as a less exaggerated masculine lead was ineffective. Commentators have described JD as being important to the series' post-trilogy, particularly with his unresolved status within series canon in the aftermath of the ending of Gears 5, and the manner in which this may affect the creative direction of a potential direct sequel to Gears 5.

== Development ==
According to Rod Fergusson, then-studio head of the Coalition, the idea of setting the fourth mainline Gears of War game in the future and giving Marcus Fenix a son originated during Epic Games’ earlier planning for a post-Gears of War 3 sequel before Microsoft acquired the franchise. After taking over the series, The Coalition set Gears of War 4 25 years after the third game and paired that time jump with what Fergusson described as a “fresh visual aesthetic” and a youthful cast. Fergusson later said this gave the developers “a lot of head room” to evolve the new characters over time, citing JD’s character arc in Gears 5 as an example. In writing for new characters, Franchise Narrative Director Bonnie Jean Mah stated that these new characters, with or without their connections and trappings to the Gears of War universe, need to be interesting and believable in their own way as part of their guiding principle.

Within the game universe, JD is the son of Marcus Fenix and Anya Stroud. He is named after Marcus' deceased best friend, Dominic Santiago. He is described as "an idealist who wants to live his life with purpose", and the character's backstory involve him running away from home as a youth and enlisting with the armed forces of the Coalition of Ordered Governments, leading to a rift between him and his father who disapproves of his actions. JD eventually attains the rank of lieutenant before going AWOL with his best friend Delmont "Del" Walker due to a classified incident involving the deaths of innocent civilians by COG security forces, and seeks refuge within an Outsider village led by Reyna Diaz, who oppose the autocratic rule of the COG government. JD's distinguishing features include blond hair, blue-grey eyes, a slight unshaven stubble, as well as a previously broken nose which The Coalition intended to "give him more character". Unlike his father, JD is written as a goofier and more lighthearted character, who regularly makes quippy remarks instead of growling in a dour manner.

For the character models of JD and his friends, the team attempted to redesign the human characters of the Gears of War franchise with more realistic body proportions. The team experimented with taking personal effects off a character model's waists or legs to reduce their overall mass. They concluded that it "looked odd" as there is already an established set of subjective expectations for the franchise's characters, particularly with the way they would move around in the in-game environment or take cover. According to creative director Chuck Osieja, the team resolved to find a middle ground between the "giant moon boots and big blocky characters" of the original games, and realistic and believable sensibilities while retaining the "power and strength" that Gears characters.

The Coalition intended for JD's character design to be recognizable when portrayed by a cosplayer at a fan convention. Visually, JD's look undergoes a number of changes between Gears of War 4 and Gears 5. In the former, JD is a former COG soldier trapped between two divergent worlds and is trying to adapt to the Outsiders' lifestyle. To reflect and convey the concept of duality in JD's visual design, his style of dress integrates COG tech with the Outsiders' signature reclaimed clothing to help visually differentiate him. JD is not shown to be wearing any armor when his first appears as a member of the Outsiders; instead, he combines a reclaimed leather jacket with typical COG-styled accessories like a holster, backpack and military boots. To reflect the introduction of hazardous weather elements into the gameplay of Gears of War 4, concept artists explored putting a hood and googles on JD's face to show protection from strong winds, but settled on a subtler approach via a faded army green scarf as an accessory instead of obscuring his face. JD's final look, following his reunion with Marcus, has him wearing khaki work pants and a rolled-sleeve sweatshirt under his protective chest plate.

By the development of Gears 5, The Coalition had shifted the series’ narrative focus away from JD and toward Kait. Fergusson described this as a natural progression, arguing that Gears of War 4 had effectively already been Kait’s story and comparing its structure to Mad Max: Fury Road, with JD serving more as a support character than as the true dramatic center. JD's look and personality in Gears 5 undergoes a dramatic change following an incident at the conclusion of the game's first act, which is intended to reflect his intense combat experiences since Gears of War 4. Besides a shaved head and grown out beard, he also has a severe scar on his face, and wears a medical device for pain management of his still-healing arm which glows blue when activated. Like the game's other main characters, JD undergoes costume changes to match the environments they visit.

=== Portrayal ===
It's kind of terrifying, because I get to be the lead in a new era of Gears, which is unbelievable, amazing, and exciting. I'm the legacy, because my dad is Marcus Fenix. JD's a soldier and a bit of a freedom fighter, and in his heart he's a bit of a renegade. He's different from Marcus, but he's still that heroic archetype."

— Liam McIntyre

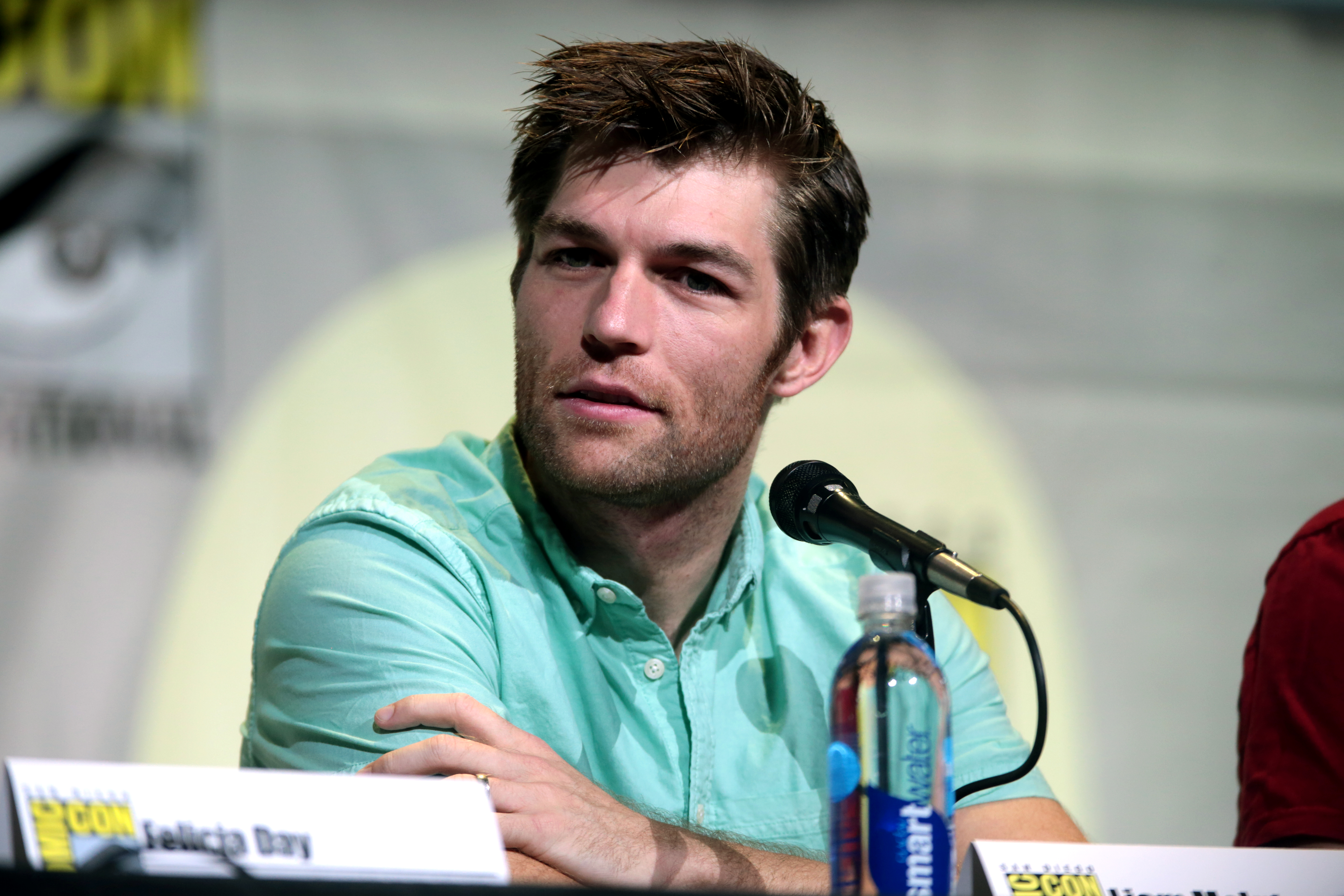
Liam McIntyre voiced JD Fenix for all video game appearances.

JD's voice actor, Liam McIntyre, described his character as "very different to his father in the sense that he gets to be the new young kid on the block. He's sort of the millennial of the story." McIntyre noted that JD brings a fresh perspective into the series, noting that "he sees his tough grump of father but he's the young hopeful one", and describe JD's attempts to reconcile with his father as yielding potential for a "wonderful kind of conflict". As JD is born after the war with the Locust Horde and had not gone through any of the hardship his father had experienced, he thinks that he is making the world a better place and that he does not want to emulate his father. McIntyre said the events of Gears of War 4 is a formative experience for the character as he starts to encounter some of the terrible things his father once saw, and his personality would evolve from these experiences.

McIntyre was excited to secure the role of JD Fenix, his first video game character role. He admitted to have experienced pressure about playing the son of an iconic video game character as he wanted to live up to the expectations of "hardcore fans of the franchise". On the differences between portraying a video game character as opposed to working in television or film, McIntyre explained in an interview that he is more likely to be working in an actual set which replicates the setting, which is something he had taken for granted; whereas for a video game character role, he would be reliant on extensive instructions to visualize a given scene respond to the circumstances the player character find themselves in, and that he spends a lot of energy vocalizing to his best ability. McIntyre opined that other actors in the industry have begun to form the view that "uniquely amazing stories" could be told through the video game medium due to its interactive nature, and that while he portrays JD Fenix, the player also has agency in the character's actions and is not a passive observer. In the years after the release of Gears 5, McIntyre would publicly discuss his commitment to the character when approached for comment. In 2026, he publicly shared a potential storyline idea where Marcus would have to confront his son who has somehow been reanimated or brought back to life by supernatural forces.

== Appearances ==
=== Gears of War 4 ===
Gears of War 4 introduced JD Fenix as the main character of a rebuilt postwar setting shaped by the Coalition of Ordered Governments’ reliance on DeeBee robots and First Minister Jinn’s reconstruction policies, placing him and his companions in a markedly different political and technological environment from that of the original trilogy. Prior to the events of the game, JD defected from the COG armed forces alongside Del and joined a faction of Outsiders who occasionally raid COG settlements for resources like materials and power. Using his inside knowledge of the COG administration, JD leads one such raid on an unfinished and unoccupied COG settlement to steal a special fabricator device, which is capable of quickly constructing munitions. JD and his group manage to fend off the settlement's robotic DeeBee soldiers and escape back to their village with the fabricator. However, the COG's First Minister Mina Jinn locates and confronts JD's group via a robot proxy which broadcasts her messages. Assuming that the Outsiders are responsible for a slew of missing COG citizens, she orders a contingent of DeeBee forces to attack the village in pursuit of JD, who helped the villagers repel the invasion.

As night falls and the villagers recover from the attack, a "swarm" of monstrous creatures arrive and abduct everyone, except for JD and his companions who had been inadvertently locked away by Reyna. JD visits his estranged father Marcus Fenix who resides at the dilapidated Stroud family estate to ask for help in tracking the villagers, where they are attacked by Jinn's DeeBee forces. Marcus arms JD's group and leads their escape into the wilds. They travel to Fort Reval, where thousands of Locust corpses were buried at the conclusion of the war 25 years ago, to investigate a possible lead suggested by Marcus, who is soon abducted by a creature the group dubbed the Snatcher. JD and his friends pursue the Snatcher, eventually discovering evidence of numerous human beings being harvested and mutated into Swarm creatures. Marcus is located and rescued before he is processed, and reveals that the Swarm are in fact mutated iterations of a resurgent Locust Horde following a long term period of dormancy where they undergo a metamorphosis. As Marcus was also briefly connected to the Swarm's hive mind, JD and his friends also learn that Reyna is still alive and set out to find her, but ultimately fails to rescue her in time by the game's ending.

=== Gears 5 ===
By the opening events of Gears 5, which takes place two weeks after Reyna's death, JD has rejoined the COG along with his father and friends in order to fight the new Swarm threat as members of the newly reformed Delta Squad, which was led by Marcus in the original Gears of War trilogy. JD is the player character of the game's first act, where several elements of his backstory established in the game's antecedent is fleshed out: he is revealed to be the successful outcome of a breeding program initiated by First Minister Jinn, whose mother Anya Stroud is originally infertile but later died due to unspecified circumstances. JD's former comrade Fahz Chutani also reveals during an assignment to assist with evacuation efforts from COG settlement 2 that JD was in fact responsible for ordering the use of lethal force on civilians during a protest at the same settlement, which led to his desertion from the COG out of guilt and shame, and which leads to his estrangement from Del and Reyna's daughter Kait as he had concealed the truth of his involvement in the civilian massacre from them. When Swarm forces threaten to overwhelm their evacuation convoy, JD implores Baird to prematurely fire the Hammer of Dawn satellite, a solar-powered and network-based superweapon which was instrumental in fighting the Locust Horde. While the Swarm forces are annihilated by the superweapon, the Hammer of Dawn malfunctions and begins firing wildly, severely injuring him.

Following the incident, JD is promoted to the rank of captain and appears for the remainder of Gears 5 as a recurring non-player character, whereas the player assumes control of Kait as the player character. His relationship with Kait deteriorates further when he openly questions her competency and loyalty when he encounters her at an Outsider Village led by her recently deceased uncle. However, their relationship gradually improves after a remorseful JD, accompanied by Fahz, offered his assistance in a rogue mission reactivating the Hammer of Dawn and recovering the network's targeting beacons in the Vasgar desert. Upon Delta Squad's return to New Ephyra, the COG's capital and seat of power, a Swarm invasion led by a resurrected and transformed Reyna commences. JD and Del is later incapacitated by Reyna following a failed attack: his fate is ultimately decided by the player, where a choice is presented between saving one character at the expense of the other who is then murdered by Reyna.

=== Novels ===
JD appears as a major character in Gears of War: Ascendance, a novel set between Gears of War 4 and Gears 5, and Gears of War: Bloodlines, which takes place during the intervening four months between the evacuation of Settlement 2 and the siege of the Outsider Riftworm Village in Gears 5.

== Promotion and merchandise ==
JD Fenix is first introduced in a promotional cinematic trailer for Gears of War 4 running and defending himself from hostile enemies, which is interspersed with flashbacks of his childhood with his parents. A detailed statue of JD Fenix riding a COG Bike by TriForce is included with copies of the Collector's Edition of Gears of War 4. In 2016, McFarlane Toys released a highly detailed action figure for the character, which stands 7 inches tall, rests atop a stand, and includes his weapon in-hand.

== Reception ==
The character's physical appearance and personality has received varied commentary from various sources. Robert Zak from PCGamesN found him "surprisingly handsome," but "generically" so. Steven Hansen from Destructoid, meanwhile, found that "modern handsome man ideal" felt focus tested, comparing him to the "alt machisimo" of Brad Pitt's character in the film Fight Club and contrasting it with his father, whose machismo was more in line with Dolph Lundgren from the film Rocky IV. Jason Hidalgo from The Reno Gazette Journal felt his features mixed the stubbornness of his father with the softness of his mother.

Reviewers for Gears of War 4 have often comparing him unfavorably to both Marcus Fenix and Kait Diaz. Writing for Killscreen, Reid McCarther singled out JD's habit of making frivolous "Whedon-esque quips" to his friends as one of two moments which stuck out from the game. To McCarther, JD is a "winking rapscallion" hero typical of the characters played by Harrison Ford, who is tough enough to weather inhuman conditions, and yet is sufficiently down to earth to wear distinctly normal person clothes and complain about his physical discomfort. In terms of personality, McCarthier found JD and his like-minded friends to be "too earnest, jovial, and just plain soft to hang with the snarling monsters and viscera-soaked battlefields" in the latter half of the game, and suggested that the Coalition's attempt to humanize JD by "replacing a caricature of manliness with a subtler and less immediately ridiculous one" to be ineffective, suggesting that this is undermined by Kait being the only same-aged woman in his proximity as well as the sexual tension between the characters. McCarther formed the view that JD would be less confused and more effective as a character if he is fully accepted by the developers as the kind of man who is born into the series' violent, militant world setting. Other reviewers share similar sentiments: Sam Mackovech from Ars Technica called JD a "Generic Tinder Guy" in terms of his happy-go-lucky "vacant personality". Zak argued that he could not take the game's new generation of characters seriously whenever Marcus Fenix is absent, and specifically singled out an "anodyne running joke" between JD and Del as more appropriate for a subreddit chat than a battlefield, though he conceded that the solid overarching story overcame his misgivings about the character banter. Maddy Myers observed that Gears of War 4 tried for a "Marcus 2.0" with JD, but argued that his "total lack of charm" demonstrated that being a series lead takes more than "huge trapezius muscles" or being a famous war hero's blue-eyed son.

Conversely, Arthus Gies from Polygon praised JD as a less morose lead compared to Marcus, as well as the comparative simplicity of the storyline which follows the search and rescue efforts by his group for their family and friends as effective. Gies also appreciated the depiction of the strained relationship between him and his father, which offers a more nuanced perspective compared to previous Gears games. Elijah Beahm from The Escapist considered Gears of War 4 to be a storytelling improvement over its predecessors, and that its protagonist is essentially "Nathan Drake in power armor", a pleasant character who wise-cracks without despair and is willing to take risks to protect those he cared about.

JD’s reception became more nuanced with Gears 5, when the series repositioned him from playable lead to supporting figure and foregrounded his role in the backstory of the Settlement 2 massacre. Some commentators approved of the narrative shift which displaces JD as the franchise’s main focal character: for example, Mackovech approved of his transition into a "grizzled and distant personality" as he felt that it neatly fits into the game's Kait-centric plot. Beahm said the sense of familiarity presented by Gears of War 4 is "a masterstroke of subversion" upon hindsight, with the revelation that JD has a deeply problematic personality hidden behind a blustering and joking persona, which comes undone in its sequel as his friends learn the truth behind his decision to defect from the COG.

The narrative decision to let players decide JD's fate near the end of Gears 5 has generated critical discussion due to his status as a major series character, and the resulting storyline implications this causes for the series’ continuity following Gears 5. Ford James from Gamesradar said the decision is not an easy one as both JD and Del are likeable characters. Connor Makar from Eurogamer expressed a preference for JD's survival at the end of Gears 5, as it progresses the character development of both Marcus and himself, whereas Del's narrative importance is extraneous as his arc is nearly wrapped up by the game's ending. Makar said while he prefers a version of JD "that doesn't stupidly leap into dangerous situations to try and show up his dad", it's clear that the Coalition wanted to take the series in a different direction. Makar argued that it makes more sense if JD survives as it resolves the acrimonious nature of the relationship between both characters which began in Gears of War 4, and move it past bravado. Stuart Glover from GamingBolt shared a similar view, believing that JD surviving as a canonical choice would deliver a sequel "rich in character development for Marcus and JD". On the other hand, both David Thier and Paul Tassi from Forbes argued that Del is the more logical choice as the survivor, and directed criticism towards what they perceive to be an uneven character arc for JD, as well as the abrupt and contrived nature of the choice which they argued had undermined the series' narrative direction.

Coverage and discussion of JD Fenix in the 2020s have tended to focus less on his characterization in isolation and more on his unresolved status within the series’ continuity, as well as direct commentary from McIntyre regarding his future involvement in the series.
