= Luke Di Somma =

New Zealand musical theatre composer, lyricist, musical director

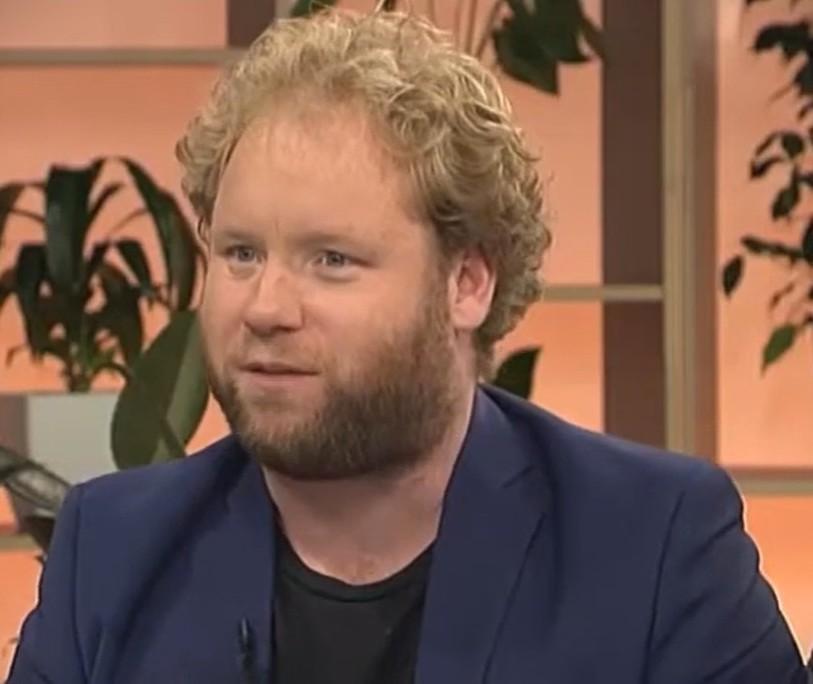
- Di Somma in 2017

Background information
- Genres: Musical theatre, opera
- Occupations: Lyricist, composer, musical director
- Website: www.lukedisomma.com

Luke Di Somma is a New Zealand lyricist, composer, writer and director. He studied at the University of Canterbury, the New Zealand School of Music and the Tisch School of the Arts. His punk-rock musical That Bloody Woman was a smash hit at the 2015 Christchurch Arts Festival, and subsequently toured New Zealand, playing to over 30,000 people. Other compositions include Dinostory and The Things Between Us. He has been commissioned by New Zealand Opera to write a comedic opera about a group of unruly tourists who toured New Zealand in 2019.

== Early life and education ==
Di Somma grew up in Christchurch, where he attended Cashmere High School. Both his parents are journalists.

Di Somma has a Bachelor of Music from the University of Canterbury, and First Class Honours in conducting and composition from the New Zealand School of Music, where he studied under Michael Norris, Jack Body, John Psathas, and Kenneth Young. Di Somma received a Fulbright scholarship to study at New York University's Tisch School of the Arts, where he completed a Master of Fine Arts through the Graduate Musical Theatre Writing Programme.

== Work ==
Di Somma co-wrote punk-rock musical That Bloody Woman with Gregory Cooper in 2015. The musical was a smash hit at that year's Christchurch Arts Festival and subsequently toured the country, playing to over 30,000 people.

In 2017, the first 45 minutes of a work about dinosaurs, Dinostory, played at Andrew Lloyd Webber's The Other Palace. Di Somma's coming-of-age musical The Things Between Us premiered as part of the Christchurch Arts Festival in September 2017.

In 2021, Di Somma, Livi Reihana and Amanda Kennedy were commissioned by New Zealand Opera to write a comedic opera based on a group of British tourists who caused upset around the country in 2019, some of whom were subsequently deported.

In 2025, Di Somma co-created the television series Happiness, about a theatre director coming home to Tauranga. Di Somma served as Music Director, and composed several songs for the fictional musicals The Trojan Horse and Sherlock performed in the context of the series.

=== Teaching and directing ===
Di Somma has taught at Federation University Australia, New York University, Victorian College of the Arts, the National Academy of Singing and Dramatic Arts, and the Stella Adler Musical Theatre Intensive in New York.

Di Somma was musical director for the European premiere of Lin-Manuel Miranda's 21 Chump St at the Tristan Bates Theatre in London's West End. Other directing work includes Hedwig And The Angry Inch, Two Guvnors at The Court Theatre, Spamalot, Sweeney Todd, The Full Monty, Les Misérables, and Chicago. Di Somma regularly appears as a guest conductor with the Christchurch Symphony Orchestra. He founded the Christchurch Pops Choir, and the biennial Christchurch International Musical Theatre Summer School.

=== Writing ===
In a review of musical theatre in New Zealand, Di Somma wrote

"The Broadway actor Andréa Burns once told me that every song is a fight. And we love a good fight in New Zealand. We battled Everest, French eco-terrorists, nuclear power, apartheid and as is the case with my current project, we fought for universal suffrage. We are less apathetic than we give ourselves credit for. If we can embrace that distinctive brand of aspiration and soar with our feet on the ground, we may do more than just finding our voice; we may create a new voice in international musical theatre - a hopeful yet humble form where underdogs fight and communities sing. We should embrace our accent, find appropriate subject material, tell Māori and Pasifika and other New Zealand stories."

Di Somma was based in London 2015–2017, and then Melbourne, Australia, where he taught at Federation University Australia.

He has been described by broadcaster Kim Hill as the "wunderkind of the Christchurch musical scene".
