= Happiness (New Zealand TV series) =

2025 New Zealand musical-comedy television

- Genre: Musical-comedy
- Created by: Kip Chapman; Luke Di Somma
- Written by: Kip Chapman; Simone Nathan; Dan Musgrove
- Directed by: Robyn Grace
- Starring: Rebecca Gibney; Harry McNaughton; Maaka Pohatu; Peter Hambleton
- Composer: Luke Di Somma
- Country of origin: New Zealand

Production
- Producers: Harriet Crampton; Kip Chapman
- Editor: Lisa Hough
- Production company: Greenstone TV

Original release
- Network: Warner Bros. Discovery New Zealand
- Release: 2025 – present

Happiness is a 2025 musical-comedy television series created by Kip Chapman and Luke Di Somma and produced by Greenstone TV for Warner Bros. Discovery New Zealand and made with the support of NZ on Air.

== Premise ==
Charlie Summers, ex-Kiwi Broadway director, is forced by circumstance to return to his home town of Tauranga, where his mum makes him join her amateur musical theatre society.

== Cast and characters ==
- Harry McNaughton as Charlie
- Rebecca Gibney as Gaye
- Jessie Lawrence as Jacqui
- Marshayla Christie as Gloria
- Peter Hambleton as Adrian
- Bronwyn Bradley as Nicky
- Henry Auva'a as Connor
- Joel Granger as Adam
- Maaka Pohatu as Mikaere
- Melody Lui-Webster as Mia
- RV Quijano as Ezra
- Louies Lui-Webster

== Episodes ==
The series has six 20 minute episodes.

== Reviews ==
- "Review: New Zealand’s first musical sitcom Happiness hums with charm and joy" The Spin Off
- "Is Rebecca Gibney's musical comedy Happiness a show-stopper or a bit flat? - Karl Puschmann". New Zealand Herald.
