= Million Dollar Cold Case =

2017 Australian television program

- Genre: True crime documentary
- Narrated by: Rebecca Gibney
- Country of origin: Australia
- Original language: English
- No. of seasons: 1
- No. of episodes: 4

Production
- Executive producer: Debbie Byrne
- Running time: 60 minutes

Original release
- Network: Seven Network
- Release: 15 March – 5 April 2017

Million Dollar Cold Case is an Australian true crime and documentary television show that first screened on the Seven Network on 15 March 2017. The series presents cold cases and appeals to viewers to help provide any leads or clues that could help solve a past crime, with a A$1 million reward on offer. Details about the victim, the original investigation and interviews with witnesses and relatives of the victims are featured, as well as information about potential suspects.

The program was first announced at Seven's upfronts in 2016 and has cooperation with the Homicide Squad Cold Case Team.

== Broadcast ==
The series debuted in Australia on the Seven Network on 15 March 2017.

== Episodes ==
No.	Title	Original release date	Australian viewers
1	"Episode 1"	15 March 2017	703,000
2	"Episode 2"	22 March 2017	661,000
3	"Episode 3"	29 March 2017	734,000
4	"Episode 4"	5 April 2017	698,000
