= That Bloody Woman =

2015 musical in New Zealand

That Bloody Woman is a 2015 punk-rock musical written by Luke Di Somma and Gregory Cooper. It is based on the life of Kate Sheppard and charts the suffragism struggle in New Zealand and its opposition by Richard Seddon. The musical was commissioned by Christchurch Arts Festival and premiered there in August 2015. It played in Auckland and Christchurch in 2016, and toured New Plymouth, Wellington and Dunedin in 2017. An original cast recording was made and released in 2016. That Bloody Woman is set to hit the Christchurch stage once again as Showbiz Christchurch prepare for their opening night on 5 July, featuring an all-female creative team and rock band.

== Origin and development ==
Luke Di Somma describes seeing "emo rock musical" Bloody, Bloody Andrew Jackson in Los Angeles in 2010 and being inspired to consider what the New Zealand-equivalent story would be. He sought out a co-writer, and found Gregory Cooper, who he had only met once, and who when approached had to Google the term "librettist". In July 2010 the pair had written a first draft of what they consider was still a very conventional musical. At that point they had 17 songs, only one of which made it into the final version. Overall they estimate they wrote 60 songs for the production, consulting Hansard so they could use words and phrases from the original suffrage debates. With funding from Creative New Zealand, they kept working and took part in a workshop at the Court Theatre. Audience testing in May 2013 showed Court Theatre artistic director Ross Gumbley that the piece had potential even though overall it did not work, and Kate was too unlikeable.

Christchurch Arts Festival director Craig Cooper got in touch in March 2014 and offered Di Somma and Cooper the use of the spiegeltent at the festival. The restrictions this placed on set design and approach forced the writers to consider the piece as more of a cabaret, with Kate "coming back in time to tell us what went wrong because her legacy got f*****." Using a 1977 Bette Midler concert in Cleveland as inspiration for Kate's character, Cooper rewrote the first half of the musical in a week. Around this time, the original director Shane Bosher had other commitments, and Kip Chapman was selected to replace him. Di Somma admits that the songs for the last part of the musical were not written until after rehearsals had already begun. The rehearsal period was three weeks in July 2015.

== First production ==
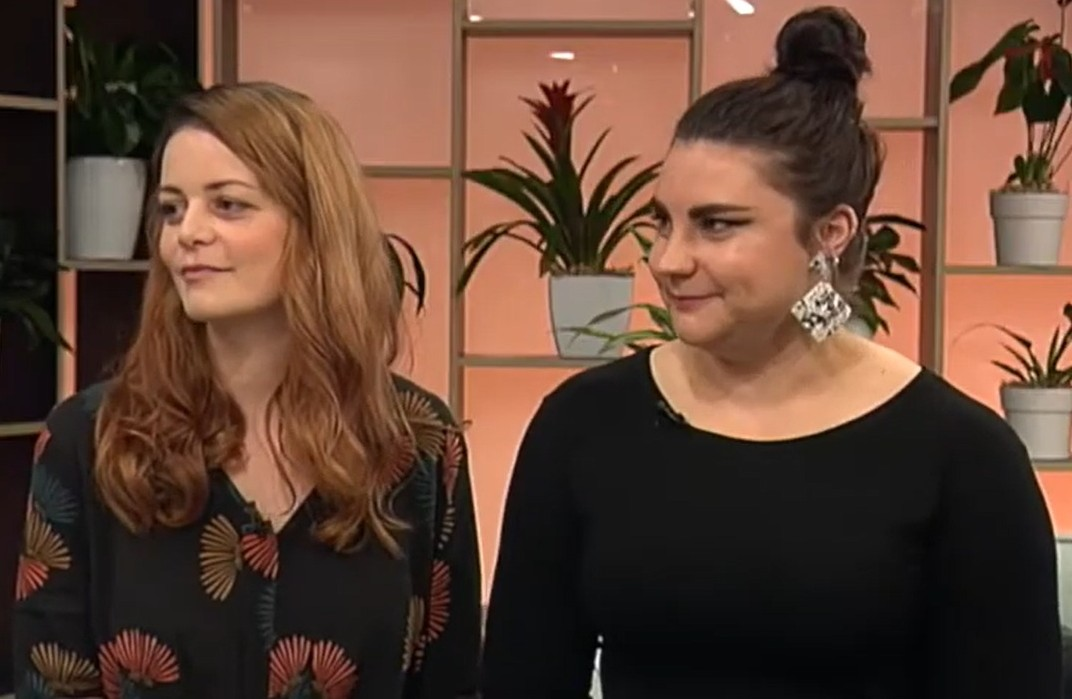
Left to right: Amy Straker, Phoebe Hurst in 2017

The musical premiered at the Arts Centre in Christchurch as a part of the Christchurch Arts Festival, which had commissioned it. The show was originally programmed for three nights from 28 August 2015. It was directed by Kip Chapman, with Esther Stephens as Kate Sheppard and Geoff Dolan as Richard "King Dick" Seddon. Phoebe Hurst, Amy Straker, Kyle Chuen and Cameron Douglas comprised "The Gang".

== Critical reception ==
All three shows sold out, and all received standing ovations. Colin McColl, the artistic director of the Auckland Theatre Company, said "I was blown away. I was astounded at how clever the lyrics were and the whole concept of a punk rock musical." He immediately dropped a show from his year's schedule in order to put That Bloody Woman on in Auckland.

The production then toured New Zealand, appearing at Sky City Theatre, Auckland, and Court Theatre, Christchurch, in 2016, Crystal Palace, New Plymouth, Opera House, Wellington, the Fortune Theatre, Dunedin, the Theatre Royal in Nelson, a spiegeltent and the Hawera Memorial Theatre at the Taranaki International Arts Festival, the Clarence Street Theatre in Hamilton, the Municipal Theatre in Napier, and a spiegeltent in Tauranga in 2017. The tour was directed by Jennifer Ward-Lealand.

Critics have described the show as a "badass feminist rock show not to be missed" and "outstandingly successful". Esther Stephens as Kate was "charming yet defiant and persistent, commanding the stage effortlessly and always sympathetic". In contrast, Richard “King Dick" Seddon was "patronising, fur-bedecked, ponytail-pulling and a thoroughly nasty misogynist" which Geoffrey Dolan played with "serious loathsomeness".

== Synopsis ==
The show opens in 1868 with Kate Sheppard travelling from England to New Zealand and settling in Christchurch, where she meets and marries accountant Walter, and has a son, Douglas. She meets her best friend Jennie and Jennie's husband William Lovell-Smith. Kate realises that social and economic inequities were just as bad in New Zealand as in England, and the women had little power to effect change. Problems of alcohol and domestic violence are described.

The turning point for Kate is attending an event in 1885 where she hears the Women's Christian Temperance Union's Mary Leavett speak. Kate goes on to establish the New Zealand WCTU with Ada Wells and Jennie Lovell-Smith. Despite lots of activities with the WCTU, Kate realises nothing is changing, and nothing will change until women have the right to vote.

The 1891 suffrage petition is begun, and women use bicycles to access large areas to canvas support. However, 10,000 signatures is not enough and the petition fails. Richard "King Dick" Seddon rails against Kate and her followers, and works to discredit them.

A second petition gets more than 20,000 signatures, but Kate's efforts are again stymied by Seddon. Walter takes their son to England and Kate is unable to stop him as children are legally the property of their father. Kate also reveals that she is in love with William Lovell-Smith, her best friend's husband. Kate's female supporters urge her not to give up. In 1893, a third petition gathers 30,000 signatures. The bill passes, New Zealand is the first country in the world to grant women the vote.

== Musical numbers ==
Performer names for the first cast are given in brackets, as although Kate Sheppard and Dick Seddon are named parts, the performers playing The Gang change roles through the performance. The roles they play include Jennie Lovell-Smith, Ada Wells, Mary Leavitt, Walter Sheppard, William Lovell-Smith, Kate's uncle and father, suffrage supporters Sir John Hall and Sir John Ballance, and an unnamed vicar. The Gang were Phoebe Hurst, Amy Straker, Kyle Chuen and Cameron Douglas in the original cast.

- That Bloody Woman (Phoebe Hurst, Amy Straker)
- History/Her story
- God's Own Country
- Amen
- Punchdrunk
- Change Doesn't Come for Free (Phoebe Hurst, Amy Straker, Kyle Chuen and Cameron Douglas)
- Last Drinks
- Quarter Acre Dream (Phoebe Hurst)
- Last Drinks (reprise)
- Tricky Dicky (Geoffrey Dolan, Kyle Chuen and Cameron Douglas)
- Enough (Esther Stephens, Phoebe Hurst, Amy Straker)
- Two Johns (Esther Stephens, Phoebe Hurst, Amy Straker, Kyle Chuen and Cameron Douglas)
- Ride On (Esther Stephens, Phoebe Hurst, Amy Straker, Kyle Chuen and Cameron Douglas)
- Petticoat Government
- Things Read, Things Unsaid
- Fuck Fuck Fuckity Fuck (Esther Stephens, Phoebe Hurst, Amy Straker)
- The Man with Two Wives (Amy Straker)
- Hands off My Property (Cameron Douglas and Kyle Chuen)
- Tempest in Your Longing Soul (Esther Stephens)
- The Line (Geoffrey Dolan, Esther Stephens, Phoebe Hurst, Amy Straker, Kyle Chuen and Cameron Douglas)
- The World Was Made for Women Too
- Finale – History/Her-story (Esther Stephens, Phoebe Hurst, Amy Straker, Geoffrey Dolan, Kyle Chuen and Cameron Douglas)

== Recordings ==
An original cast recording was released 1 December 2016, having been funded by crowdsourcing.

== Production history ==
Date	Place	Production company and crew	Cast
August 2015, and subsequent national tour	Christchurch Arts Centre, and national tour	Director Kip Chapman Musical Director: Luke Di Somma Associate Musical Director: Andy Manning Set Designer: Rachael Walker Costume Designer: Lisa Holmes AV Designer: Brendan Albrey Choreography: Jillian Gambino	Esther Stephens as Kate Sheppard Geoffrey Dolan as Dick Seddon Phoebe Hurst, Amy Straker, Kyle Chuen and Cameron Douglas as The Gang
June 2018	Centrepoint, Palmerston North	Presented by Centrepoint Theatre. Director: Lyndee-Jane Rutherford Musical director: Kane Parsons Choreographer: Leigh Evans	Lisa Chappell as Kate Sheppard Jeff Kingsford-Brown as Dick Seddon Supporting cast: Janine Bonny, Gary Clark, Kirsten Clark, Frankie Curd, Indiya Henman, Ellen Hodder, Steve Jenkins, Katte Johnston, Rebekah Matsas, Helena Pawson, Trudy Pearson, Leona Revell, Laura Signal and Michelle Thompson
4 February – 7 March 2021	Stagecraft Theatre, Wellington	Directors: Joy Hellyer & Paul Kay Musical Director: Katie Morton Orchestrations by Luke Di Somma, Andy Manning, Cameron Burnett, Tim Heeringa & Hannah Elise	Frankie Leota as Kate Sheppard Megan Neill as Kate Sheppard understudy and ensemble Kate Boyle as Jennie Lovell-Smith and ensemble Emma Katene as Ada Wells and ensemble Allison Phillips as Mary Leavitt and ensemble Jayne Grace as the Vicar and ensemble Chris Green as Richard "King Dick" Seddon Chris Gordon as Walter Sheppard and ensemble Angus Dunn as William Lovell-Smith and ensemble And as Hallelujah Bonnets: Katie Morton on Keys, Maddy Walker on Guitar, Jevon Wright on Bass, and Kim Andrews on Drums
July 2021	Mayfair Theatre, Dunedin	Presented by Taieri Musical Director: Kim Morgan Musical director: Bridget Telfer-Milne	Anna Langford as Kate Sheppard Max Beal as Richard "King Dick" Seddon Kelly Hocking, Jess Clarke, Janine Weatherly, Peter Hocking, Darrel Read, Kieran Kelly, Kane Welsh, Jane Craigie-Read, Bethany Cook and Chelsea McRae as The Gang.
3–17 July 2021	Westpoint Performing Arts Centre, Auckland		

The show was picked up by Music Theatre International (MTI) for licensing in 2021. In 2022 MTI, StageAntics and Amici Trust's Junior Theatre NZ will collaborate on a youth performance "That Bloody Woman – Youth Edition" in Christchurch, from 26 to 30 April. The youth production will be directed by Emma Bishop, with Andy Manning, the Associate Musical Director for the New Zealand premiere of the show in 2015, and choreographer Hillary Moulder.
