= Jigsaw (1989 film) =

- Directed by: Marc Gracie
- Written by: Marc Gracie; Chris Thompson
- Based on: an idea by Rosa Colosimo
- Produced by: Rosa Colosimo
- Starring: Rebecca Gibney; Dominic Sweeney; Nic Lathouris
- Cinematography: Jaems Grant
- Production company: Rosa Colosimo Films
- Distributed by: Video Entertainment (video)
- Release date: 1989
- Running time: 86 mins
- Country: Australia
- Language: English

Jigsaw is a 1989 thriller film starring Rebecca Gibney.

== Plot ==
Virginia York's husband is killed on the first day of their honeymoon and she is the prime suspect.

== Cast ==
- Rebecca Gibney as Virginia York
- Dominic Sweeney as Detective Constable Broulle
- Gary Day as Gordon Carroll
- Terence Donovan as Jack McClusky
- Michael Coard as Aaron York
- James Wright as Ray Carpenter
- David Bradshaw as Alex York
- John Flaus as Oliver
- Brenda Addie as Jean
- Anthony Fletcher as Tony
- Nick Lathouris as Ted Minter
