= Gears of War 4 =

2016 video game

- Developer: The Coalition
- Publisher: Microsoft Studios
- Director: Chuck Osieja
- Producer: Walter de Torres
- Programmer: Kate Rayner
- Artist: Kirk Gibbons
- Writer: Tom Bissell
- Composer: Ramin Djawadi
- Series: Gears of War
- Engine: Unreal Engine 4
- Platforms: Windows; Xbox One
- Release: October 11, 2016 (Note: The Ultimate Edition for the game was released on October 7, 2016, while the standard and collector's editions were released on October 11.)
- Genre: Third-person shooter
- Modes: Single-player, multiplayer

Gears of War 4 is a 2016 third-person shooter game developed by The Coalition and published by Microsoft Studios for Windows and Xbox One. It is the fourth main installment in the Gears of War series, and the first mainline entry not to be developed by Epic Games. Taking place 25 years after the events of Gears of War 3, the game's plot, which can be played in single or co-operative play, focuses on James Dominic "JD" Fenix, son of Marcus Fenix, as he and his allies take on the Swarm, a new threat related to the Locusts.

Upon release, the game received generally positive reviews, with critics praising the game's combat, visuals and set pieces, while criticism was directed towards the campaign and writing. A sequel, Gears 5, was released on September 10, 2019.

== Gameplay ==
Many gameplay elements from the previous games are reintroduced, along with new elements such as the Dropshot weapon that fires explosive drills and the Buzzkill that fires ricocheting sawblades at enemies. Players can also perform a short distance shoulder charge, knocking enemies off balance and enemies can also pull players out of cover and perform their own takedowns. The game features 4 categories of weather: from heavy breeze (trees, leaves, dust kicking up) and can grow into violent category 3 windstorms that can affect combat and weapon usage.

Like previous entries in the series, the story campaign can be played through co-operatively with a second player in a local or online co-operative mode.

== Story ==
=== Setting ===
Gears of War 4 takes place 25 years after the events of Gears of War 3, where the Imulsion Countermeasure weapon destroyed all Imulsion on the planet Sera, killing the Locust and the Lambent in the process, the weapon forced humanity to adapt to new ways of survival after knocking out the use of fossil fuels, and bringing across the planet powerful windstorms called "Windflares". To protect the surviving human population from decline, estimated to be hundreds of thousands, the reformed Coalition of Ordered Governments (COG) established walled-off cities to protect its citizens from the dangers outside, while declaring martial law to prevent any travel outside the cities. However, some human survivors rejected the viewpoints of the COG and formed a group called the "Outsiders" that live outside of the COG jurisdiction, raiding COG territory to gather resources.

The game's main story focuses on J.D. Fenix (Liam McIntyre), the son of Marcus Fenix and Anya Stroud, who, alongside his friends Delmont "Del" Walker (Eugene Byrd) and Kait Diaz (Laura Bailey), deal with a new threat to humanity's survival.

=== Plot ===
The leader of the reformed Coalition of Ordered Governments, First Minister Jinn (Angel Desai), commemorates the 25th anniversary of humanity's victory over the Locust. An elderly Hoffman, who is present at the ceremony, recounts past battles at Aspho Fields, Emergence Day, and Anvil Gate.

Meanwhile, J.D. and Del have recently deserted the COG after disagreeing with Jinn's hardline policies and join a group of Outsiders led by Reyna (Justina Machado). In order to help their village, J.D. and Del decide to raid a nearby COG settlement under construction to steal a special fabricator. They are accompanied by Kait (Laura Bailey), Reyna's daughter, and her uncle Oscar (Jimmy Smits), a former Gear and Locust War veteran. Though they are forced to battle the COG's new robotic DeeBee soldiers, aided by an unknown person remotely controlling some of the settlement's machinery, J.D. and his group manage to successfully steal the fabricator and escape back to their village. They are then confronted by Jinn (broadcasting via a DeeBee), who accuses them of kidnapping her people, much to their confusion, before launching an all-out assault on the village. J.D. and his friends manage to repel Jinn's forces and get to work repairing the village's power generator. However, in the midst of repairs, unknown creatures raid the village, capturing everybody including Reyna and Oscar. As her last act, Reyna locks J.D., Del, and Kait inside the power station to protect them.

Dubbing the unknown attackers the "Swarm", J.D. reluctantly asks his father Marcus Fenix (John DiMaggio) for help. Marcus, who is still angry at J.D. for joining the authoritarian COG and then endangering himself by abandoning it, is reluctant to help J.D. until he shows him that the Swarm is not human. Suspicious, Marcus decides to lead the group to Fort Reval where thousands of Locust corpses were buried to dispose of them. After escaping another attack by Jinn's forces, the group reaches inside the city, where they are ambushed by a Snatcher that captures Marcus. As J.D. and his friends pursue the Snatcher, they find evidence of the Swarm being responsible for the abduction of COG citizens, whose bodies are being harvested to create more Swarm creatures. They also hypothesize that when the Locust were hit by the Imulsion Countermeasure, they did not die. Instead, their bodies underwent a long term metamorphosis over the last 25 years until the Locust changed into the Swarm. J.D. eventually manages to track down Marcus and free him. Marcus reveals that the Swarm operates on a hive mind and that he was briefly connected to it, confirming their hypothesis that they are the Locust reborn and that Reyna is still alive and being kept at another Locust burial site, but none of the other villagers survived.

Determined to save her mother, Kait demands that Marcus lead them to her. He takes the group to Tollen Dam, where they discover that the burial site has been converted into a Swarm hive. The group fights and kills the Speaker, the Swarm leader that had captured Reyna, who refuses to give them any information about what happened to Reyna. Realizing that the hive's defenses are too formidable for them to breach on their own, the group fights their way to a radio antenna—noticing that the Swarm seem to be able to affect DeeBees' behavior—where Marcus calls for the assistance of Augustus Cole (Lester Speight), Damon Baird (Fred Tatasciore) and Samantha Byrne (Claudia Black), with the latter two now being lovers. Baird, now a famed industrialist and the creator of the DeeBees, is revealed to have been the one who aided the group during the earlier settlement raid and brings a pair of mech suits that J.D. and Kait use to fight their way into the hive. Inside, they find out that Reyna has been forcefully integrated into the hive's network, and that removing her would result in her death. Despite this, Reyna requests that Kait end her life, which she tearfully does. She then inherits her mother's amulet, which had belonged to Kait's grandmother. However, upon closer inspection, it bears a resemblance to the symbol of the Locust Queen Myrrah – implying that Reyna was her daughter and Kait is her granddaughter.

In a post-credits scene Oscar, still alive, cuts himself out of the Snatcher that had captured him.

== Development ==
Gears of War 4 was originally being developed by Epic; selected aspects of their work were incorporated into Coalition's work. During E3 2013, Microsoft Studios vice president Phil Spencer said he thought more Gears of War games were possible. On January 27, 2014, Microsoft announced that they had acquired the rights to the franchise from Epic Games, and a new game would be developed for Xbox One by Black Tusk Studios, an in-house studio which was later renamed The Coalition to better signify its responsibility for the Gears of War franchise. Rod Fergusson, former Director of Production at Epic Games on the Gears of War franchise, joined Microsoft and plays a key studio leadership role at The Coalition on the development of the franchise going forward. Epic Games' Ray Davis admitted that "having been through shipping hell with Rod Fergusson on past Gears of War games I can say that I'm absolutely confident he'll do a great job with the franchise at Microsoft." On April 1, 2015, The Coalition producer Allie Henze confirmed that Gears of War 4 would not be released for Xbox 360.

Gears of War 4 was presented for the first time during Microsoft's E3 2015 press conference. Studio head Rod Fergusson stated that the gameplay presented during the press conference was meant to reflect the overall tone of the game, returning to the franchise's roots as being a "monster game", and "something personal, intimate, dark, and mysterious"; and the setting's design took heavy inspiration from Northern Italy. Gears of War 4 would be set on Sera, nearly 25 years after the events of Gears of War 3, with Marcus Fenix's son JD Fenix as the lead character. Owing to the people of Sera rebuilding their society after the Locust war, the game's new weapons are inspired by construction equipment. The game features a new enemy faction known as "the Swarm"; the Swarm's "Drones" behave similarly to the Locusts of previous games, "Juvies" are fast moving and their screams can burst "pods" that contain more enemies, while Pouncers can pin the player to the ground and fire quills from their tails.

The multiplayer components of the game were co-developed by Splash Damage, who also developed the multiplayer components of Gears of War: Ultimate Edition A multiplayer beta was released on April 25, 2016; those who purchased Ultimate Edition received early access to the beta beginning on April 18, 2016. The campaign supports local and online co-op with two players. Gears of War 4 was the first game to make use of SGX developed by Speech Graphics to automatically animate gameplay dialogue. Speaking about the future of the game, and the Gears of War series itself, Fergusson stated that "one of the things that's nice about Microsoft's investment is that we know, unless this does horribly, we're probably going to do another one."

Gears of War 4 runs at 30 frames per second in its single player modes, and 60 in its multiplayer modes, both at 1080p. The game uses Unreal Engine 4. Similarly to Halo 5: Guardians, the game employs a dynamic scaling system to maintain a consistent frame rate, under which the resolution is automatically decreased and upscaled back to 1080p during more intensive scenes. Ferguson stated that the Xbox One S has an improved CPU and GPU which allows for more consistent resolution on Gears of War 4, compared to the original Xbox One. During its E3 2016 press conference, Microsoft announced that Gears of War 4 would be released on PC exclusively for Windows 10 Windows Store. It is an Xbox Play Anywhere game, with digital cross-buys and cross-platform multiplayer available between Windows 10 and Xbox versions. In August 2016, Game of Thrones composer Ramin Djawadi confirmed he would be involved as the main creator of Gear of War 4's soundtrack. In an interview, Djawadi spoke about the sound of the score, "Obviously, I want to make it very different to Game of Thrones. "Whenever I approach a new project, I want to make sure I'm setting up a new sound - even though we're still using a lot of orchestra and percussion."

On September 19, 2016, The Coalition announced that the game had "gone gold", meaning development had finished and manufacturing production had begun.

Microsoft at its E3 keynote on July 11, 2017, explained that several Xbox titles would be receiving a free 4K visual update. The Coalition's technical director Kate Rayner said that The Coalition had been working with Microsoft's Xbox One X console for some time now. Gears of War 4 supports native 4K resolution, with higher resolution textures across the entire game including characters, environments, visual effects, and more on the Xbox One X console. Combined with the 4K resolution, Gears of War 4 on the Xbox One X also features High Dynamic Range (HDR) colors with Wide Color Gamut Support. Two technical improvement to the visuals beyond higher resolution textures are fully dynamic shadows and improved reflections. With this new update comes support for Dolby Atmos 7.1.4 sound technology that adds additional sound channels for a more immersive game environment.

== Reception ==
Reception

Aggregate score
Aggregator	Score
Metacritic	(PC) 86/100 (XONE) 84/100

Review scores
Publication	Score
Destructoid	8/10
Electronic Gaming Monthly	9/10
Game Informer	9.25/10
GameRevolution	4/5
GameSpot	7/10
GamesRadar+	4/5
Giant Bomb	4/5
IGN	9.2/10
PC Gamer (US)	75/100
Polygon	9/10
VideoGamer.com	9/10

Gears of War 4 received "generally favorable" reviews, according to review aggregator website Metacritic.

Ryan McCaffery of IGN gave the game 9.2 out of 10, stating in his verdict: "I never expected to compare Gears of War 4 to The Force Awakens, but I couldn't be happier to do so. Like the latest chapter in the story from a time long ago in a galaxy far, far away, Gears of War 4 is directed by a new generation of creators, shares a lot of similar narrative structures to the beloved first piece of the trilogy it succeeds, and is an experience you'll walk away from with a big smile on your face – in campaign, Versus, and Horde modes alike. It's about as good of a franchise reawakening as I could've hoped for." He also added "Gears of War 4 plays it fairly safe but brilliantly executes on a variety-packed campaign and meaty multiplayer suite."

Mike Mahardy of GameSpot rewarded Gears of War 4 a score of 7 out of 10, reasoning "This is a shooter teetering on the edge of something greater, but despite the improvements it makes to the storied franchise, its missteps hold it back. There is inspiration here, and creativity in the way Gears of War 4 rethinks its multiplayer modes. But the lackluster campaign and technical issues are blights on an otherwise exhilarating shooter. The result is a whole that doesn't reflect the quality of its often stellar parts.". Arthur Gies of Polygon scored the game with a 9 out of 10. Gies stated at the end of his review: "When I was finished with Gears of War 4's campaign, I remember wondering why it didn't do more. The next morning, I was playing the game again, not out of obligation, but because I wanted to. Taken all together, Gears of War 4 doesn't completely reinvent the genre, and it's not always "bigger." But it's a remarkably consistent, complete package with the kind of refinement and focus few other games can manage, providing excellent solo, cooperative, and competitive options that rank it as one of the best action games of 2016."

Critics generally praised Gears of War 4 for successfully revitalizing the franchise under new developer The Coalition. Many reviewers highlighted its strong multiplayer offerings, particularly the redesigned Horde mode, while noting that the campaign relied heavily on familiar series conventions rather than major innovation. Eurogamer described the game as "a cautious revival but a very worthwhile one", while PC Gamer praised the multiplayer's variety despite criticizing the campaign as feeling "stuck in 2006".

The game's Horde mode received particular acclaim. GameSpot called it "fantastic" and praised the introduction of the fabricator system and class-based roles, which encouraged greater teamwork and strategic play than previous iterations of the mode.

Some reviewers welcomed the shift toward a more personal story focused on a new generation of protagonists. Wired praised the game's lighter tone and singled out Kait Diaz as a strong and emotionally complex character, although it also criticized the conservative level design and familiarity of the combat encounters.

The soundtrack was met with positive to mixed response by critics. There was disappointment from fans for themes being less heroic compared to Steve Jablonsky's and Kevin Riepl's themes.

=== Sales ===
Gears of War 4 was the second best-selling retail game in the UK in its week of release, only behind FIFA 17. In the United States, it was the third best-selling game in the month of October, behind Battlefield 1, and Mafia III, and overall the twentieth best-selling game of 2016.

=== Awards ===
Year	Award	Category	Result	Ref.
2016	The Game Awards 2016	Best Action Game	Nominated	
2016	The Game Awards 2016	Best Multiplayer	Nominated	
2017	15th Annual Visual Effects Society Awards	Outstanding Visual Effects in a Real-Time Project	Nominated	
2017	20th Annual D.I.C.E. Awards	Action Game of the Year	Nominated	
