= Lucky Break (1994 film) =

- US release poster
- Directed by: Ben Lewin
- Written by: Ben Lewin
- Produced by: Judi Levine; Bob Weis
- Starring: Gia Carides; Anthony La Paglia
- Cinematography: Vincent Monton
- Edited by: Peter Carrodus
- Music by: Paul Grabowsky
- Production companies: Generations Films; Lewin Films; Such Much Films; Pandora Cinema; Australian Film Finance Corporation (AFFC)
- Distributed by: United International Pictures
- Release date: 20 October 1994 (Australia)
- Running time: 94 minutes
- Country: Australia
- Language: English
- Box office: $197,540 (Australia)

Lucky Break (released in the United States as Paperback Romance) is a 1994 Australian romantic comedy film directed and written by Ben Lewin, about an eccentric romance novelist. Actress Rebecca Gibney was nominated for Best Actress in a Supporting Role by the Australian Film Institute in 1995 for her role in the film. The film was a critical success in Australia but flopped at both the domestic and international box office, where it received generally mixed reviews from critics.

== Plot ==
Sophie (Gia Carides) is an Australian romance novelist, with a wild imagination. She is also a polio survivor who cannot walk without crutches and a leg brace and who is used to indulging her romantic and lustful fantasies (all of which are shown onscreen) only in her imagination and through her novels. After she breaks her leg and finds herself treated normally for the first time in her life, Sophie meets and begins a relationship with Eddie (Anthony LaPaglia). Similarly to one of Sophie's bodice-ripping page-turners, though, Eddie is about to marry his wealthy and shrewish fiancée, Gloria (Rebecca Gibney) and is also under police investigation for a recent jewelry robbery.

== Cast ==
- Gia Carides as Sophie
- Anthony LaPaglia as Edward 'Eddie' Murcer
- Rebecca Gibney as Gloria Wrightman
- Robyn Nevin as Anne-Marie LePine
- Marshall Napier as George LePine
- Nicholas Bell as Sophie's Doctor
- Jacek Koman as Detective Yuri Borodinoff
- Michael Veitch as Detective Sergeant Scott
- Mary-Anne Fahey as Myra
- Lynda Gibson as Carol
- Terry Norris as Judge

== Reception ==
The film received rave reviews but did not do well at the box office, opening tenth in Australia with a gross of $114,950 in its first week. It went on to gross just $197,540 in Australia.

On review aggregator website Rotten Tomatoes, the film has a score of 33% based on 9 reviews, with an average rating of 5.4/10.

David Stratton of Variety wrote "Lucky Break adds a few new wrinkles to the venerable and resurgent formula of romantic comedy. Writer/director Ben Lewin comes up with some oddball ideas again, but his screenplay lacks the wit and zaniness that might have propelled this modest offering into wider distribution".
