= Rebecca Gibney =

New Zealand / Australian actor

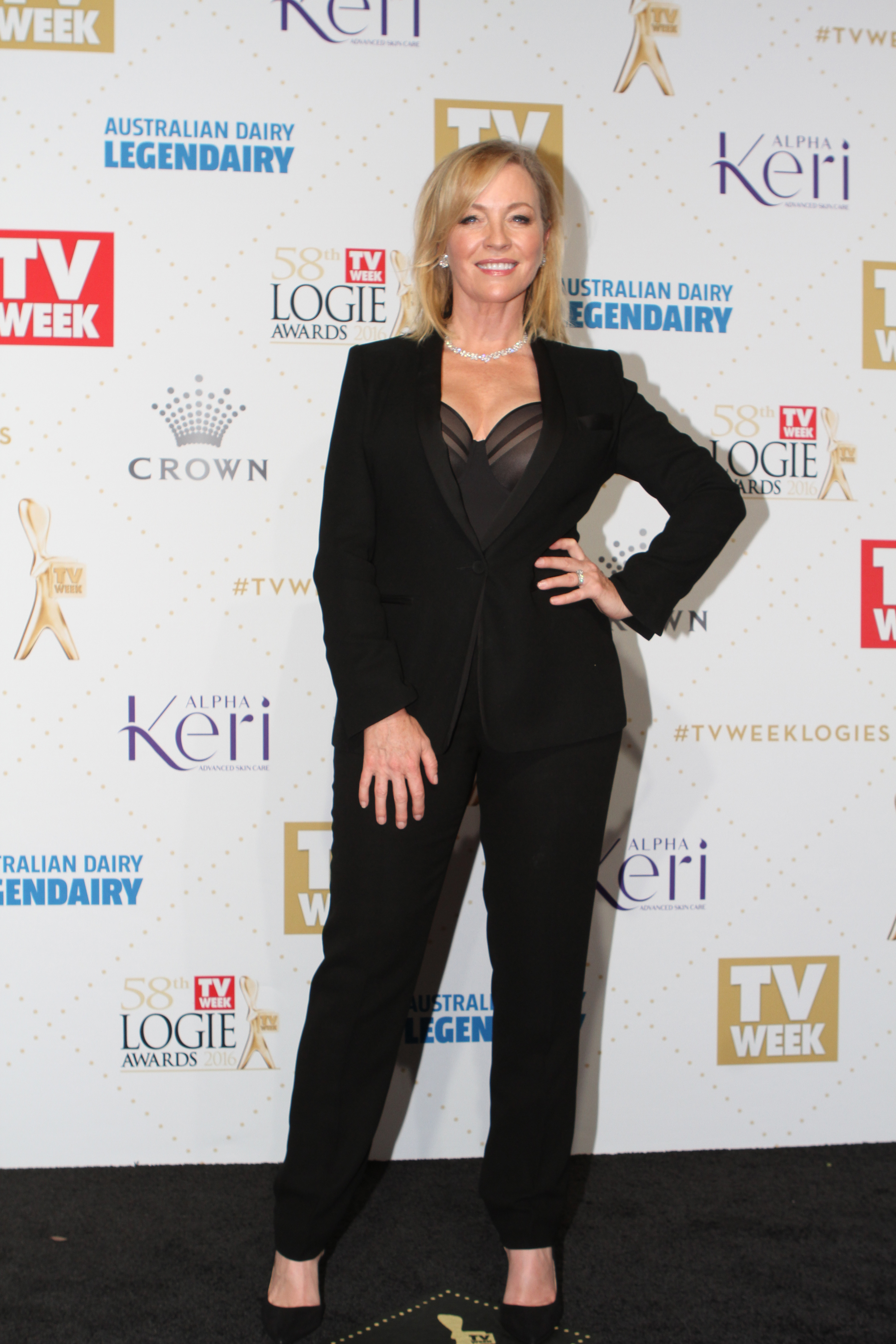
- Rebecca Gibney 2016
- Born: Rebecca Catherine Gibney; Levin, Manawatū-Whanganui, New Zealand
- Citizenship: New Zealand; Australia
- Education: Wellington Girls' College
- Occupations: Actress, television presenter
- Years active: 1980–present
- Notable work: The Flying Doctors; All Together Now; Halifax f.p. Packed to the Rafters; Wanted
- Spouses: Irwin Thomas (m. 1992; div. 1995) Richard Bell (m. 2001)
- Partner: Richard Wilkins (late 1980s)
- Children: 1

Rebecca Catherine Gibney is a New Zealand-Australian actress and television presenter. She is known for her roles on Australian television in The Flying Doctors, Halifax f.p., Packed to the Rafters, Winter and Wanted. She has also featured in a number of Australian films, including Mental and The Dressmaker. She is a Gold Logie winner.

== Early life and education ==
Rebecca Catherine Gibney was born in Levin, New Zealand and attended Wellington Girls' College, where she admits to having been a rebellious teenager.

While working as a receptionist at a Wellington jeweller, Gibney undertook part-time modelling work.

== Career ==
Gibney's modelling work led to parts in television advertisements and bit parts in New Zealand TV series' Pioneer Women and Inside Straight.

Her first main role was in TV film Among the Cinders, but after bypassing cinemas, it did not screen on New Zealand television until four years later, in 1987. She spent two months on the series Sea Urchins, before relocating to Melbourne, Australia at the age of 19 to star as Julie Davis in the Australian children's series Zoo Family. Roles in 1985 TV film I Live with Me Dad and 1986 crime miniseries The Great Bookie Robbery followed.

She went on to star as mechanic Emma Plimpton in the popular drama series The Flying Doctors. In 1990, she had a lead role in the film Jigsaw, and then played Guinea Malone in miniseries Come in Spinner. The role won her an Australian Film Institute Award for Best Actress in a Leading Role in a Miniseries and a Silver Logie for Most Outstanding Actress. That same year she also appeared in 1990 miniseries Ring of Scorpio.

In the early 1990s, when Gibney had established a fan base and gained confidence, she travelled to Los Angeles to explore the idea of furthering her career in the US, but after a few weeks, she found Hollywood to be inauthentic, and after asking herself why she would abandon her successful career in Australia, she returned home.

In 1991, Gibney starred in the Channel Nine sitcom All Together Now opposite Jon English, staying with the series until 1993. The role earned her two Logie nominations. After her departure, she starred in the miniseries Snowy. Channel 9 were so impressed with Gibney, that they had the producers of the series create a role especially for her – the title character of Dr. Jane Halifax in Halifax f.p.. The series debuted in 1994 with the episode "Acts of Betrayal", and continued with a further 20 telemovies up until 2002. She was nominated for six Silver Logie Awards and two AFI Awards for her role.

Gibney starred in 1994 film Lucky Break (aka Paperback Romance), opposite Anthony LaPaglia, for which she was nominated for an AFI Award for Best Actress in a Supporting Role. She appeared in 1997 children's film Joey, and the miniseries' Kangaroo Palace (1997), and The Day of the Roses (1998), and was nominated for Most Outstanding Actress at the 1999 Logie Awards for her role in the latter, a drama based on the 1977 Granville rail disaster. She also starred in 1998 horror mystery TV film 13 Gantry Row, alongside John Adam, Nicholas Hammond, Marshall Napier and Michael Caton.

From 2002 to 2003, Gibney had a role in police procedural crime drama Stingers and from 2003 to 2006, she co-starred with Claudia Karvan in the telemovie trilogy Small Claims, as Chrissy, earning her a Silver Logie nomination for Most Outstanding Actress in a Drama Series. She appeared in the movie adaptation of Stephen King's novel Salem's Lot in 2004, followed by King's 2006 anthology series Nightmares and Dreamscapes. In 2006, she played the role of Lydia, a hippie restaurant owner and operator in the Network Ten drama series Tripping Over.

In 2007, Gibney had a small role in the film Clubland, starring Brenda Blethyn, and directed by Cherie Nowlan (known as Introducing the Dwights in the United States).

A series of Australian television advertisements for Advil in 2006/2007 featured Gibney and her family. A new television advertisement with only Gibney appeared in October 2007.

Gibney hosted four seasons of a documentary series produced by Television New Zealand called Sensing Murder (2006–2010), in which unsolved cases of New Zealand murders or missing persons are probed by psychic investigators from both New Zealand and Australia. Gibney was executive producer. While there, she also starred in 2008 New Zealand feature film The Map Reader, alongside Michael Hurst, playing Amelia, mother of Michael, the map reader of the title. Gibney then took a hiatus from acting after the birth of her son.

From August 2008 until its conclusion in 2013, Gibney played the female lead of Julie Rafter on the Seven Network's Packed to the Rafters. Her role in the series proved popular, winning her the Gold Logie in 2009. She also won two Silver Logies, and earned a further seven Logie Award nominations, an AFI Award nomination for Best Lead Actress and a 2011 AACTA Audience Choice Award nomination. In 2009, she appeared in the true crime movie In Her Skin (aka I Am You), based on the Rachel Barber case, alongside Guy Pearce, Sam Neill and Miranda Otto.

In 2010, Gibney played the lead role on Channel Ten’s telemovie Wicked Love: The Maria Korp Story, opposite Vince Colosimo. She then starred as Shirley Moochmore in the 2012 P. J. Hogan film Mental alongside Toni Collette and Anthony LaPaglia, gaining 13 kg for the role. The role saw her nominated for an AACTA Award, an Australian Film Critics Association Award and a Film Critics Circle of Australia Award.

In 2014, Gibney co-produced and starred in a new TV film crime drama, The Killing Field. She played a detective tasked with solving the murder of a teenage girl in a small town. In 2014, she returned to New Zealand for an episode of SBS series Who Do You Think You Are?, exploring her own real life family background with the help of ancestry and genealogy experts. Winter, a follow-up series to The Killing Field, screened in 2015. That same year she appeared in the TV biopic Peter Allen: Not the Boy Next Door, with Sigrid Thornton, and feature film The Dressmaker, alongside Kate Winslet, Judy Davis, Hugo Weaving and Liam Hemsworth.

Gibney then co-created, produced (together with her partner Richard Bell) and starred in three seasons of drama Wanted, beginning in 2016. The series was nominated for a 2017 International Emmy Award for Best Drama Series. In 2017, she appeared in the web documentary series The Circle, developed for the real estate company Domain. The series, also featuring Richard Roxburgh and Dan Wyllie, saw two couples trading their small urban apartments in Sydney and Melbourne for a more affordable life on the Sunshine Coast. In 2019 she played a crime boss in New Zealand film Lowdown Dirty Criminals, a departure from her protagonist roles.

In 2020, Gibney reprised the role of Dr. Jane Halifax for Halifax: Retribution, which earned her an AACTA Award nomination for Best Lead Actress.

In 2021, Gibney also reprised her role as Julie Rafter from Packed to the Rafters in the Amazon Prime miniseries Back to the Rafters. That same year, she joined the cast of Under the Vines. which she also executive produced. That same year, she appeared as a contestant on the second season of Celebrity MasterChef Australia, competing opposite TV personality Chrissie Swan, comedian Dilruk Jayasinha and footballer Archie Thompson, fashion designer Collette Dinnigan, singer Dami Im, ex-Olympian Ian Thorpe and actor Matthew Le Nevez. AFL player Nick Riewoldt won the series and Tilly Ramsay (Gordon Ramsay's daughter) was runner-up.

In 2024, Gibney appeared in the Stan series Prosper. In November of that year, she began appearing in the New Zealand-Australian crime drama series A Remarkable Place to Die. The Queenstown-set series is a co-production between TVNZ and Australia's Nine Network. In December 2024, it was announced that Gibney was cast as lead for New Zealand series Happiness.

Gibney was inducted into the Logie Hall of Fame at the 2024 TV WEEK Logie Awards. She was the fourth woman ever to be inducted, after Ruth Cracknell, Noni Hazlehurst and Kerri-Anne Kennerley. During the presentation, her son Zachary gave a heartfelt speech, expressing pride in her as both an actor and a parent.

Gibney most recently competed on the 2025 season of Dancing with the Stars. She was eliminated in episode 5. In July 2025, she began performing in the Sydney Theatre Company season for the play Circle Mirror Transformation, marking her return to theatre for the first time in almost 20 years and her debut with the STC.

In September 2025, Gibney was announced as host on the game show reboot Millionaire Hot Seat for Network 10, replacing Eddie McGuire formerly on Nine.

On 21 October 2026, ABC announced Gibney would lead the ABC series Rural Crime Unit.

== Personal life ==
Gibney dated television presenter Richard Wilkins in the late 1980s, when she was 22. She lived in Melbourne and Wilkins was based in Sydney. They broke up when she discovered that Wilkins was cheating on her with a flight attendant, who he subsequently ended up marrying. Despite this, she holds no hard feelings towards Wilkins.

Gibney was married to Irwin Thomas (a.k.a. Jack Jones, former lead singer of Southern Sons), from 1992 to 1995. They divorced three years later.

She met production designer Richard Bell in 1999 on the set of Halifax f.p. when she was 35. They got together in 2000, were married in November 2001 and moved to Tasmania, before going on to have their son, Zachary.

In 2017, Gibney temporarily moved to Dunedin, New Zealand with her family, while filming the TV series Under the Vines. When her son Zachary moved to Wellington in 2022 to study acting at Toi Whakaari New Zealand Drama School, they initially stayed in Dunedin, but eventually sold their home in 2024, to move 'north' and be nearer to Zachary, who is now studying in Sydney.

Gibney holds dual New Zealand and Australian citizenship. Her mother, Shirley lived in Brisbane, Shirley died in June 2026 at the age of 91. In 2014, while investigating her family history for the series Who Do You Think You Are?, Gibney discovered that her great-great-grandfather was part of the military invasion of Parihaka.

Gibney has spoken about her struggles with anxiety and panic attacks, and the horrific sexual abuse her mother suffered as a child, at the hands of her own alcoholic father.

In late March 2026, Gibney revealed that she had been diagnosed with both ADHD and autism at the age of 61.

== Filmography ==
=== Film ===
Year	Title	Role	Notes
1984	Among the Cinders	Sally	Feature film
1984	Mr. Wrong	Clive's Secretary	Feature film
1985	I Live with Me Dad	Jill Harkness	Feature film
1989	Jigsaw	Virginia York	Feature film
1994	Lucky Break (aka Paperback Romance)	Gloria Wrightman	Feature film
1997	Joey	Penny McGregor	Feature film
2006	Lost and Found	Mac's Mum	Feature film
2007	Clubland (aka Introducing the Dwights)	Lana	Feature film
2008	The Map Reader	Amelia Rosemont	Feature film
2009	In Her Skin	Gail	Feature film
2011	Seek	Mummy	Short film
2012	Mental	Shirley Moochmore	Feature film
2014	The Killing Field	Detective Sergeant Eve Winter	TV movie
2015	The Dressmaker	Muriel Pratt	Feature film

=== Television ===
Year	Title	Role	Notes
1983	Pioneer Women		
1984	Inside Straight		
1984	Sea Urchins	Karen	
1985	Zoo Family	Julie Davis	26 episodes
1986	The Great Bookie Robbery	Bonnie	Miniseries, 2 episodes
1986	The Anniversary	Jilly	TV movie
1986–1990; 1991	The Flying Doctors	Emma Plimpton Patterson	119 episodes
1990	Come in Spinner	Guinea Malone	Miniseries, 4 episodes
1990	Acropolis Now	Bank manager / Mrs. Spiro Strangulator	Episode: "Cappuccino Catastrophe"
1990	Ring of Scorpio	Judith	Miniseries, 4 episodes
1991–1993	All Together Now	Tracy Lawson	86 episodes
1993	Snowy	Lilian Anderson	13 episodes
1994	Time Trax	Dr. Maria Mills	Episode: "The Cure"
1994–2002	Halifax f.p.	Jane Halifax	21 episodes
1995	G.P.	Larissa Schuller	Episode: "Still Life"
1997	Kangaroo Palace	Heather Randall	Miniseries, 2 episodes
1998	The Silver Brumby	Boon Boon (voice)	Episode: "Getting Together"
1998	13 Gantry Row	Julie	TV movie
1998	The Day of the Roses	Sister Margaret Warby	Miniseries, 2 episodes
1999	Sabrina Down Under	Hilary Hexton, the Cat and Woman	TV movie
1999	Sir Arthur Conan Doyle’s The Lost World	Lady Cassandra Yorkton	Episode: "Cave of Fear"
1999	Error 2000 (aka The Millennium Disaster: Computer Crash 2000)	Nicole	TV movie
2001	Ihaka: Blunt Instrument	Kirsty Finn	TV movie
2001	Finding Hope	Hope Fox	TV movie
2001	Farscape	Rinic Sarova	Episode: "Thanks for Sharing"
2002–2003	Stingers	Criminal Barrister Ingrid Burton	13 episodes
2003	Sensing Murder: Easy Street	Host	TV movie
2004	Salem's Lot	Marjorie Glick	Miniseries, 2 episodes
2004	Small Claims	Chrissy Hindmarsh	TV movie
2005	Small Claims: White Wedding	Chrissy Hindmarsh	TV movie
2006	Small Claims: The Reunion	Chrissy Hindmarsh	TV movie
2006	Nightmares & Dreamscapes: From the Stories of Stephen King	India Fornoy	Episode: "The End of the Whole Mess"
2006	Tripping Over	Lydia	Miniseries, 6 episodes
2004–2010	Sensing Murder	Narrator	Seasons 1–4, 20 episodes
2008–2013	Packed to the Rafters	Julie Rafter	122 episodes
2010	Wicked Love: The Maria Korp Story	Maria Korp	TV movie
2014	Who Do You Think You Are?: Rebecca Gibney	Herself	1 episode
2014	The Killing Field	Det. Sgt. Eve Winter	TV movie
2015	Winter	Det. Sgt. Eve Winter	Miniseries, 6 episodes
2015	Peter Allen: Not the Boy Next Door	Marion Woolnough	Miniseries, 2 episodes
2016–2018	Wanted	Lola Buckley	Seasons 1–3, 18 episodes
2017	The Circle		Web miniseries
2019	A Peace of Nourishment	Host	Documentary
2020	Halifax: Retribution	Jane Halifax	Miniseries, 7 episodes
2021	Back to the Rafters	Julie Rafter	Miniseries, 6 episodes
2021–2024	Under the Vines	Daisy Monroe	Miniseries, seasons 1–3, 18 episodes
2023	The Brokenwood Mysteries	Tabatha Shepherd	1 episode
2024	Prosper	Abi Quinn	8 episodes
2024–present	A Remarkable Place to Die	Veronica Mallory	4 episodes
2025–present	Happiness	Gaye	1 episode
2026	NCIS: Sydney	AFP Nia Williams	3 episodes (3.12, 3.13, 3.16)
2027	Rural Crime Unit	Jolene	TV series

=== Other appearances ===
Year	Title	Role	Notes
2017	Million Dollar Cold Case	Narrator	Documentary series
2021	Celebrity MasterChef Australia	Contestant	Season 2
2022	This Is Your Life: Rebecca Gibney	Herself	1 episode
2023	Luxury Escapes: The World’s Best Holidays		
2025	Dancing with the Stars	Contestant	4 episodes
2026	Millionaire Hot Seat	Host	Game show

=== TVC ===
Year	Client
1990	Lux Soap
1996	World Vision Australia
2006–2007	Advil Liquid Capsules

== Theatre ==
Year	Title	Role	Notes
1999	Happy Days - The Arena Mega Musical	Miss Frost	Sydney Superdome, Melbourne Park, Adelaide Entertainment Centre, Brisbane Entertainment Centre, Comedy Theatre, Melbourne with Paul Dainty Productions
2008	Mum's the Word 2: Teenagers	Alison	Comedy Theatre, Melbourne with Dainty Consolidated Entertainment
2025	Circle Mirror Transformation	Marty	Wharf Theatre, Sydney with STC

== Awards and honours ==
Year	Work	Award	Category	Result
1990	Come in Spinner	Australian Film Institute Awards	Best Actress in a Leading Role in a Miniseries	Won
1991	Come in Spinner	Logie Awards	Silver Logie for Most Outstanding Actress	Won
1991	Come in Spinner	Logie Awards	Most Popular Actress in a Telemovie or Miniseries	Nominated
1992	All Together Now	Logie Awards	Most Popular Actress	Nominated
1992	All Together Now	Logie Awards	Most Popular Light Entertainment / Comedy Female Performer	Nominated
1995	Lucky Break	Australian Film Institute Awards	Best Actress in a Supporting Role	Nominated
1996	Halifax f.p.	Logie Awards	Silver Logie for Most Popular Actress	Nominated
1997	Halifax f.p.	Logie Awards	Silver Logie for Most Popular Actress	Nominated
1998	Halifax f.p: Afraid of the Dark	Australian Film Institute Awards	Best Performance by an Actress in a Leading Role in a Television Drama	Nominated
1999	The Day of the Roses	Logie Awards	Silver Logie for Most Outstanding Actress in a Series	Nominated
1999	Halifax f.p: Afraid of the Dark	Logie Awards	Silver Logie for Most Outstanding Actress in a Series	Nominated
1999	Halifax f.p: A Murder of Crows	Logie Awards	Silver Logie for Most Outstanding Actress in a Series	Nominated
2000	Halifax f.p: Swimming with Sharks	Logie Awards	Silver Logie for Most Outstanding Actress in a Series	Nominated
2000	Halifax f.p: A Person of Interest	Australian Film Institute Awards	Best Actress in a Leading Role in a Television Drama	Nominated
2001	Halifax f.p.	Logie Awards	Silver Logie for Most Popular Actress	Nominated
2005	Small Claims	Logie Awards	Silver Logie for Most Outstanding Actress in a Drama Series	Nominated
2009	Rebecca Gibney	Logie Awards	Gold Logie Award for Most Popular Personality on Australian Television	Won
2009	Packed to the Rafters	Logie Awards	Silver Logie for Most Popular Actress	Nominated
2009	Packed to the Rafters	Australian Film Institute Awards	Best Lead Actress in a Drama	Nominated
2010	Rebecca Gibney	Logie Awards	Gold Logie Award for Most Popular Personality on Australian Television	Nominated
2010	Packed to the Rafters	Logie Awards	Silver Logie for Most Popular Actress	Nominated
2010	Packed to the Rafters	Australian Film Institute Awards	Best Lead Actress in a Drama	Nominated
2011	Packed to the Rafters	AACTA Awards	Audience Choice Award	Nominated
2011	Rebecca Gibney	Logie Awards	Gold Logie Award for Most Popular Personality on Australian Television	Nominated
2011	Packed to the Rafters	Logie Awards	Silver Logie for Most Popular Actress	Nominated
2012	Packed to the Rafters	Logie Awards	Silver Logie for Most Popular Actress	Nominated
2013	Mental	AACTA Awards	Best Supporting Actress	Nominated
2013	Mental	Australian Film Critics Association Awards	Best Supporting Actress	Nominated
2013	Mental	Film Critics Circle of Australia Awards	Best Actress in a Supporting Role	Won
2017	Wanted	Emmy Awards	Best Drama Series	Nominated
2018	Wanted (Season 2)	Huawei Mate20 New Zealand Television Awards	Best Actress	Nominated
2020	Halifax: Retribution	AACTA Awards	Best Lead Actress	Nominated
2021	Rebecca Gibney	Levin NZ Walk of Fame		Honoured
2024	Rebecca Gibney	Logie Awards	Logie Hall of Fame	Honoured

Gibney has been honoured by her birthtown of Levin, New Zealand in their Walk of Fame (which commenced in 2021) and is run by Heritage Horowhenua Charitable Trust. Along with a biographical recognition on their website, there is a named commemorative plaque for her in Oxford Street, Levin.

In 2024, Gibney was inducted into the Logie Hall of Fame.
