= Liam McIntyre =

Australian actor (born 1982)

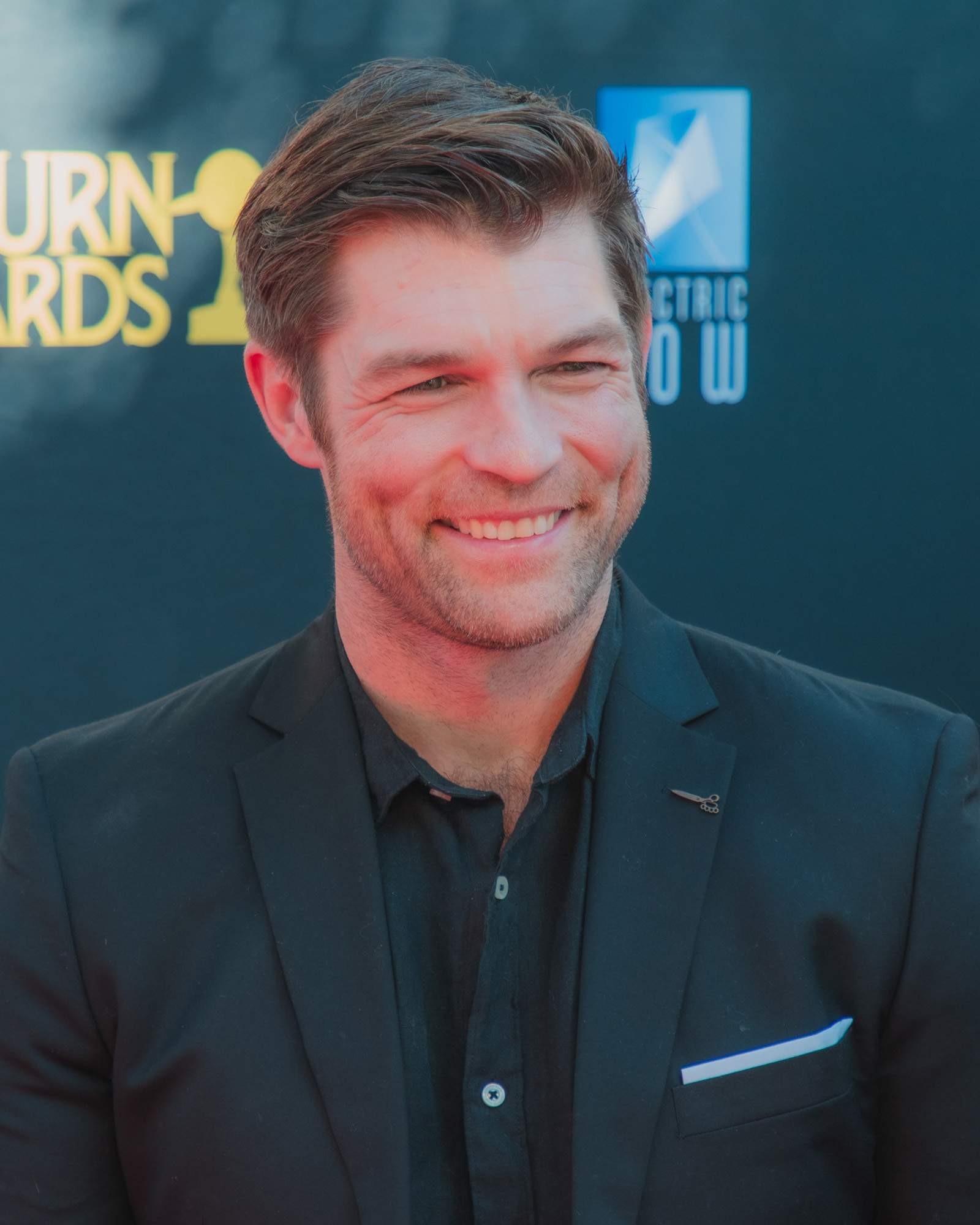
- McIntyre in 2026
- Born: Liam James McIntyre; 8 February 1982 (age 44); Adelaide, Australia
- Occupation: Actor
- Years active: 2007–present
- Spouse: Erin Hasan (m. 2014)
- Children: 2

Liam James McIntyre (born 8 February 1982) is an Australian actor, best known for playing the lead role on the Starz television series Spartacus: Vengeance and War of the Damned and as Mark Mardon / Weather Wizard on The Flash. He has also voiced JD Fenix in the Gears of War video game series, Captain Boomerang in the DC Animated Movie Universe, Commander Pyre on Star Wars Resistance, Taron Malicos in Star Wars Jedi: Fallen Order, and James "Logan" Howlett / Wolverine in Marvel's Wolverine.

== Career ==
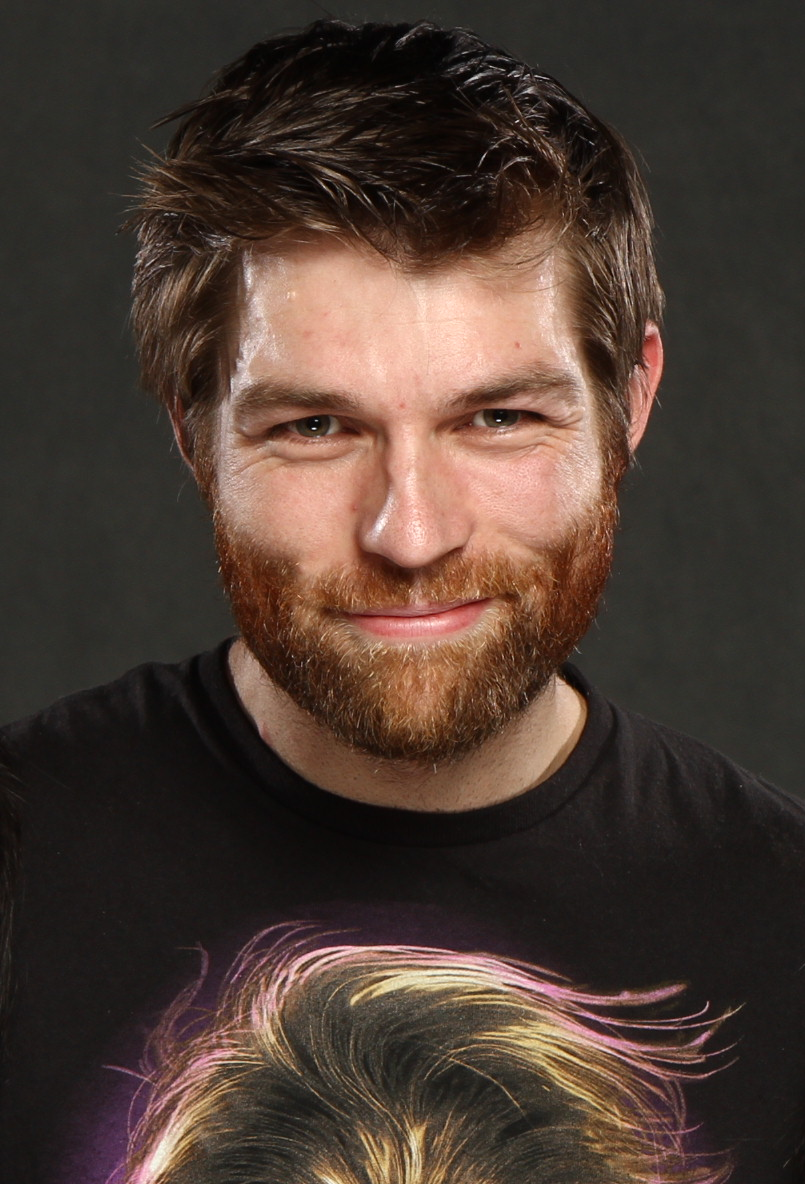
McIntyre at the 2014 Florida Supercon

=== Acting ===
McIntyre began his career appearing mainly in short films, before performing guest roles in Australian television series Rush and Neighbours. He made his American television debut on the HBO miniseries The Pacific. After actor Andy Whitfield's diagnosis and passing from Non-Hodgkin lymphoma, McIntyre would succeed him in the title role of Spartacus for the remainder of the series. He made his film debut alongside Kellan Lutz in The Legend of Hercules, in the role of Sotiris. On May 4, 2014, he starred on the Channel 7 thriller The Killing Field. From 2015 to 2016, he completed The Dream Children and Albion: The Enchanted Stallion, both independent films as Luke Delaney and Erémon. In 2015, he also starred in Unveiled, an unsold pilot, and portrayed the recurring villain Weather Wizard on The Flash.

In 2016, McIntyre played the lead character JD Fenix in the video game Gears of War 4. In January 2017, he appeared as Jason Andrews in Apple of My Eye. He played Girth Hemsworth, a fictional Hemsworth sibling on the web series Con Man and was later cast in Security, an action-thriller film starring Antonio Banderas and Ben Kingsley. He filmed a pilot for Syfy, titled The Haunted in January 2017, but it did not receive a full series order. He starred on the Australian medical-drama Pulse on ABC TV.

=== Other ventures ===
In 2016, McIntyre collaborated with Smosh Games to promote his card game Monster Lab. In 2020, he partnered with Spartacus co-star Todd Lasance to create the gaming series Get Good for the CouchSoup YouTube channel following a charity livestream benefiting Black Summer.

== Personal life ==
McIntyre was born in Adelaide, South Australia. In 2010, he began dating actress and singer Erin Hasan, the standby for Glinda the Good Witch in the original Melbourne and Sydney productions of the musical Wicked. They were engaged in December 2012 and married on 5 January 2014.

== Acting credits ==
=== Film ===
Year	Title	Role	Notes
2014	The Legend of Hercules	Sotiris	
2017	Security	Vance	
2018	Suicide Squad: Hell to Pay	George "Digger" Harkness / Captain Boomerang (voice)	Direct-to-video
2019	See You Soon	Ryan Hawkes	
2020	Justice League Dark: Apokolips War	George "Digger" Harkness / Captain Boomerang (voice)	Direct-to-video
2021	Justice Society: World War II	Arthur Curry / Aquaman (voice)	Direct-to-video
2021	This Little Love of Mine	Chip Finley	
2023	Bring Him to Me	Travis	
2024	Justice League: Crisis on Infinite Earths	Aquaman, Johnny Quick (voice)	Direct-to-video

=== Television ===
Year	Title	Role	Notes
2010	The Pacific	Lew	Episode: "Iwo Jima"
2010	Neighbours	Bradley Hewson	1 episode
2010	Rush	Sergeant Matt Connor	2 episodes
2012–13	Spartacus	Spartacus	20 episodes
2014	The Killing Field	Detective Senior Constable Dan Wild	Television film
2015–18	The Flash	Mark Mardon / Weather Wizard	5 episodes
2016	The Wizards of Aus	Bronlo the Slayer	2 episodes
2017	Pulse	Eli Nader	8 episodes
2018–20	Star Wars Resistance	Commander Pyre, additional voices	23 episodes
2020–23	Family Guy	Various voices	6 episodes
2021	Them	Clarke Wendell	10 episodes
2024	Star Trek: Lower Decks	Dr. Harrison Horseberry	Voice, episode: "Starbase 80?!"
2025	American Dad!	Todd Fox	Voice, episode: "Killer Mimosa"
2025	The Mighty Nein	Obann	Voice, episodes: "Many Gifts", "The Zadash Job"
2026	Golden Axe	Ax Battler	Voice

=== Video games ===
Year	Title	Role
2010	Star Trek Online	Capt. Anton Schaefer, Subcommander Kail, Chancellor J'mpok, Kahless (Clone)
2016	Gears of War 4	JD Fenix
2019	Gears 5	JD Fenix
2019	Star Wars Jedi: Fallen Order	Taron Malicos
2026	Marvel's Wolverine	James "Logan" Howlett / Wolverine

=== Web series ===
Year	Title	Role	Notes
2016–17	Con Man	Girth Hemsworth	3 episodes

== See also ==
- List of Caulfield Grammar School people
