= Ric Birch =

Australian television producer (born 1945)

- Born: 1945 (age 80–81); Sydney, New South Wales, Australia
- Education: Melbourne University
- Occupations: Producer, director
- Known for: "Master of Ceremonies" – Executive Producer and Director of numerous global ceremonies
- Website: https://www.spectak.com/

Ric Birch (born 1945) is an Australian producer and director. He was first known as a producer and interviewer on GTK (TV series), a popular music TV series on ABC Television. He then founded and became director of Spectak International, an events production company specializing in global ceremonies production, television, film and theatre and themed entertainment. The company has produced opening and closing ceremonies for the Commonwealth, East Asian, and Olympic Games. He is internationally known as the "Master of Ceremonies" due to his involvement in many globally seen ceremonies.

== Education and early event production ==
Birch studied a combined Arts and Law degree at Melbourne University in 1962, with the aim of becoming a lawyer. But, through volunteering backstage at the Universities annual Arts Revue, he made the change to theatrical production. He got his first job at ABC Television in Melbourne. He became a freelance director in the late 1970s, before getting his start in event production as the executive director of the opening and closing ceremonies for the Brisbane 1982 Commonwealth Games. He later went on to be Director of Entertainment at World Expo 88 in Brisbane, Queensland, Australia, during the Australian Bicentenary year.

== Olympic Games involvement ==
Birch has been involved in the planning and execution of Olympic Games Opening and Closing ceremonies for 5 different editions, making him regarded internationally as an expert these events. His Olympic career includes:

- Main producer for the opening and closing ceremonies of the LA 1984 Olympic Games.
- Executive Producer for the opening and closing ceremonies of the Barcelona 1992 Olympic Games.
- Executive Producer and Main Director of Ceremonies for the opening and closing ceremonies of the Sydney 2000 Olympic Games.
- Producer for the opening and closing ceremonies of the Torino 2006 Winter Olympic Games and Torino 2006 Winter Paralympics. This was his first time producing ceremonies for a Winter Olympic Games, which he worked with Filmmaster Events and Marco Balich.
- International Artistic Advisor for Creative Director Zhang Yimou for the opening and closing ceremonies of the 2008 Beijing Olympic Games.
- He was also hired as Executive Producer for the opening and closing ceremonies for the Rio 2016 Olympic Games, but in 2016 it was found that he had left the project due to the change of directors and planning of the event.

== Other events ==
In 1990, Birch worked as Director on the 25th Anniversary Singapore National Day Parade.

Birch was also director and producer of Sydney New Year's Eve between 1996 and 1999. His last event was NYE 1999, where in the finale light effect on the Sydney Harbour Bridge revealed the word 'Eternity' in Copperplate writing, in honour of Arthur Stace. This scene was then replicated with fireworks in the Sydney 2000 Olympics opening ceremony.

In 2009, he worked as an advisor on the 2009 Hong Kong East Asian Games opening and closing ceremonies. In 2010 he participated in the planning of celebrations to commemorate 200th anniversary of the 'Grito de Dolores' – Hidalgo's call for independence – and the beginning of the Mexican war for independence from Spain. The ceremony took place on 15 September 2010. In the same year, he helped stage the Delhi 2010 Commonwealth Games opening and closing ceremonies, but the working relationship broke down between Birch (and other contractors) and the games organizers as he was not paid in full.

== See also ==
- GTK (TV series)
