= George Foster (Australian politician) =

Australian politician (1884–1956)

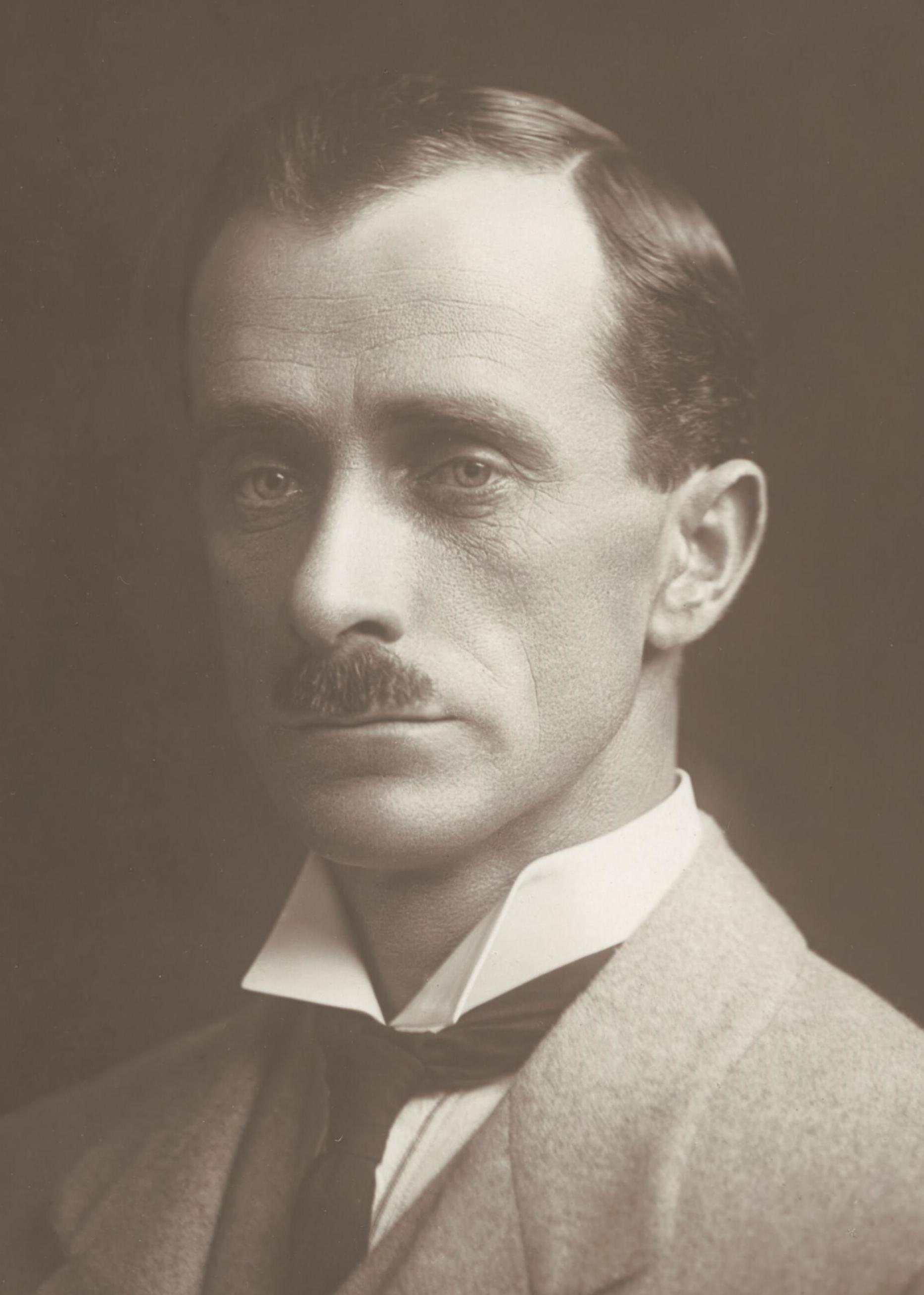

Senator for Tasmania
- In office 1 July 1920 – 30 June 1925
- Succeeded by: Charles Grant

Member of the Tasmanian House of Assembly for Denison
- In office 23 June 1917 – 31 May 1919
- Preceded by: William Burgess

Personal details
- Born: 29 January 1884 Adelaide, South Australia, Australia
- Died: 6 June 1956 (aged 72) Concord, New South Wales, Australia
- Party: Nationalist
- Spouse: Vera Pietriche (m. 1922)
- Occupation: Mechanic

George Matthew Foster (29 January 1884 – 6 June 1956) was an Australian politician. He was a member of the Nationalist Party and served terms in the Tasmanian House of Assembly (1917–1919) and as a Senator for Tasmania (1920–1925). He suffered from shell shock and his term in the Senate was marked by absenteeism. He later became a leader of the temperance movement in Sydney.

== Early life ==
Foster was born on 29 January 1884 in Adelaide, South Australia. He was the son of Isabella (née Forscutt) and George Foster, his father being a tailor's cutter. The family moved to Tasmania and he was "probably educated in Hobart", leaving school to train as a mechanic.

Foster enlisted in the Australian Imperial Force (AIF) in 1914 and served with the 3rd Light Horse Regiment. He spent three months in Gallipoli, later serving with the regiment in Egypt before being sent home to Australia due to illness. In 1917, he became the inaugural state secretary of the Returned Sailors and Soldiers Imperial League of Australia (RSSILA). He was also the state secretary of the Reinforcements Referendum Council, formed to support the "Yes" vote in the 1917 conscription plebiscite.

== State politics ==
In June 1917, Foster was elected to the Tasmanian House of Assembly at a by-election for the seat of Denison. He stood as a Nationalist with the support of the RSSILA. However, in the lead-up to the 1919 state election both he and the league disavowed any connection. He lost his seat "due to his position having been weakened by pressure groups in the electorate causing some disruption and weakening the Nationalist vote".

== Federal politics ==
Foster was elected to the Senate at the 1919 federal election, to a six-year term beginning on 1 July 1920. He was predominantly interested in issues relating to returned soldiers, also opposing any attempts to decrease defence expenditure and supporting the local manufacture of aeroplane engines. He was a member of a select committee that examined a returned soldier's claims to a war gratuity, but did not participate in its deliberations.

In July 1921, Foster was named as a co-respondent in a divorce suit brought by John Thomas Hall, whose estranged wife Florence was Foster's landlady in Melbourne. John Hall claimed £1,000 in damages on the grounds that Foster and his wife had engaged in "misconduct". The jury dismissed the petition on the grounds of connivance by Hall, but found that misconduct had occurred; as a result the presiding judge did not award Foster his legal costs. During the hearing, the court was told that Foster was an alcoholic and been hospitalised the previous year after suffering a nervous breakdown. He had also suffered from insomnia since the war and "was unable to travel in trains or trams because of the vibrations".

After 1921, Foster rarely attended the Senate, seldom voted, and made no speeches. His absenteeism "made him something of a standing joke" and The Bulletin claimed that he "grew to hate the job". In July 1923, he was granted two months leave of absence to take a health trip to Queensland, with Albert Gardiner advising the Senate that he was suffering from shell shock and was unfit to perform parliamentary duties. In October 1924, it was reported that the Confidential Finance Company had initiated lawsuits against Foster in multiple states for writing bad cheques. It was alleged that he had been absent from the Senate since February 1923, was living in Queensland, and had appeared in the Senate chamber for only a few minutes during that time, in order to avoid his seat being declared vacant.

In the session of parliament running from June 1923 to October 1924, Foster made the least appearances of any senator, attending for only six out of 95 sitting days. He was absent without leave on 64 sitting days. In February 1925, Tasmania's Taxation Department obtained a judgment against Foster for unpaid income tax. The Attorney-General of Tasmania stated that bankruptcy proceedings would be brought if no payment was made, which if successful would result in his seat being declared vacant. On 2 July 1925, the President of the Senate Thomas Givens announced that he had received a telegram from Foster announcing his resignation due to ill health.

== Later life ==
After leaving the Senate, Foster worked for periods at the Melbourne Zoo and at a Sydney land agency. He had married Vera Anita Pietriche in April 1922, with whom he had one daughter.

Foster became a disciple of Robert Brodribb Hammond, a Christian evangelist and social reformer who was a leader of the temperance movement in New South Wales. He was appointed as the superintendent of the Hammond Hotel, a facility in a converted warehouse which aimed to rehabilitate destitute men. In 1933, he became the general superintendent and secretary of Hammondville, a back-to-the-land settlement in Sydney's south-west. The Hobart Mercury published an interview with Foster about Hammondville in 1935, describing him as "a zealous spokesman for social justice, and a diligent student of ethical, psychological, and economic problems". He and Hammond hoped to build a ten-storey "temperance hotel" in Sydney. Foster selected a site on Hunter Street, but no work was completed by the time of Hammond's death in 1946. The project was abandoned the following year after it was discovered that the hotel could cost up to £500,000 to construct.

Foster died at the Concord Repatriation General Hospital in Sydney on 6 June 1956.
