= Sydney New Year's Eve =

Annual event in Sydney, Australia

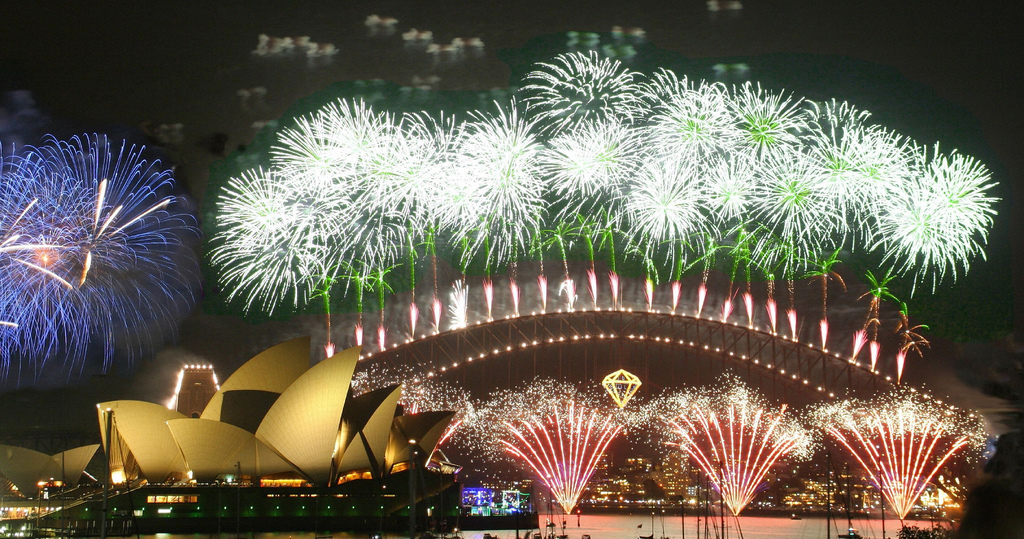
- Opening sequence of the 2006/07 Midnight Fireworks.
- Genre: New Year's Eve event
- Date: 31 December/1 January
- Begins: 8:30 pm (AEDT)
- Ends: 12:30 am (AEDT)
- Frequency: Annual
- Locations: Sydney, Australia
- Years active: 1976–present
- Inaugurated: 1976; 50 years ago
- Founder: Syd Howard
- Most recent: 2025/26
- Previous event: 2024/25
- Next event: 2026/27
- Attendance: 1.6 million
- Budget: $6.3 million (as of 2024/25)

Sydney New Year's Eve is an annual New Year's Eve fireworks event in Sydney, Australia. The event currently consists of two fireworks shows, with an evening display held at 9:00 p.m. AEDT (formerly and colloquially known as the family fireworks, and now known as the Calling Country Fireworks) involving Indigenous Australians, and the main midnight fireworks at 12:00 a.m. Fireworks are launched from barges in Port Jackson, as well as nearby landmarks such as the Sydney Opera House, and the Sydney Harbour Bridge, which serves as the main focal point of the show via lighting and pyrotechnic effects.

As one of the first major cities to celebrate the New Year, it is also called the "New Year's Eve Capital Of The World". And the event is widely-viewed in Australia and worldwide. Organizers have estimated the annual in-person attendance of the event to be around 1.5 to 1.6 million, with tourists accounting for a large portion of its attendees. Some locations, such as the Royal Botanic Garden, host ticketed seating areas.

The event is usually organised by the City of Sydney. In 2020, the fireworks were scaled back and the state government of New South Wales was given "temporary custodianship" of the event for 2020 due to the COVID-19 pandemic restrictions at the time.

== History ==
=== Origins ===
In 1976, the Sydney Committee decided to reconstitute a failing Waratah Festival as the Festival of Sydney. At the first meeting of its programme committee, they agreed that New Year's Eve should launch the new festival, a 'big bang affair'. Focusing on the harbour and adjacent areas, it would include a sail-past of decorated craft, music, and a 'spectacular fireworks display at midnight'. With this, the Festival of Sydney made New Year's Eve official for the first time. Stephen Hall was its executive director from 1977 to 1994. The 1979/80 brochure for the Festival featured an image of the fireworks over the Sydney Opera House and the slogan "Get into the '80s with a bang".

Inspiration to use the Sydney Harbour Bridge as a launchpad for fireworks came from the use of fireworks on the Brooklyn Bridge as part of its 100th anniversary celebrations in 1983.

Syd Howard, pyrotechnician, used his inspiration and the chances given to him to put fireworks displays on Sydney Harbour to use the bridge as a launchpad for fireworks. His first opportunity was in 1986 for the 75th Anniversary Review of the Royal Australian Navy. Here he introduced the "waterfall" effect as well as a pyrotechnic message on the bridge. The message read "NSW salutes Royal Australian Navy" and employed thousands of cigarette-style fireworks to create the lettering. It hung over the side of the pedestrian walkway.

From NYE 1996 to NYE 1999, management of the event was contracted out to Ric Birch's Spectak Productions. Birch, known for his work on numerous Olympic Games opening and closing ceremonies brought with him former Jimmy and the Boys frontman Ignatius Jones as Creative Director and Catriona Brown as Senior Producer.

=== 1996–1999 ===
The original Sydney New Year's Eve fireworks display (NYE 1996) was designed by Syd Howard Fireworks. The event used the pylons, arch and catwalk of the bridge, city buildings and one barge located in front of the Sydney Opera House. There was a ten-second pyrotechnic countdown. Each second, one shooting comet shot off a different building starting from North Sydney and finishing at Sydney Tower to form an Olympic Torch to welcome in 1997.

For NYE 1997, the Midnight Fireworks included the Star City Casino. Sydney Tower turned into a ticking clock with shooting comets slowly rotating around the top of the tower. The soundtrack for the countdown was a ticking clock before a bell toll rang in 1999. This bell toll also turned Sydney Tower into an Olympic Torch. Also, from NYE 1997, the Midnight Fireworks were extended to include the Harbour Bridge, the 9 pm Family Fireworks were extended to include two barges (one on each side of the bridge) and the displays were co-designed by Foti International Fireworks and Syd Howard Fireworks.

On NYE 1999 the Apollo 11 countdown, as well as air raid sirens, provided the soundtrack for the countdown. A smiley face was visible on the bridge during the show, until the finale revealed the word "Eternity" in Copperplate writing, in honour of Arthur Stace. Fireworks were also launched from the Centrepoint Tower. An unusual feature of the 1999 display was a flotilla of tugboats that made their way through the harbour, each one carrying a colourful, brightly lit model of a sea creature (such as a tropical fish, an octopus, and a sea deragon). The Fireworks Soundtrack included a five-minute "History Of Pop" featuring hits from the 1890s to the 1990s.

=== 2000–2004 ===
Since 2000, the displays have been fully designed and created by Foti International Fireworks. The 2000 celebrations (branded “Millennium Eve”) included a larger-than-life birthday cake on a pontoon barge in front of the Opera House, unveiled before midnight to celebrate 100 years of Australia’s federation. At midnight, the cake lit up with a cascading lighting effect running from the bottom of the cake to the top. A Federation Star representing 100 years since the federation of Australia appeared on the bridge during the finale.

On NYE 2001, A dove of peace slowly came into view to speak peace to the world after the September 11th terrorist attacks in New York.

On NYE 2002, the city buildings were removed from the fireworks displays. The 9 pm family fireworks had to be cancelled due to high winds of 90 km/h (56 mph). Those fireworks were then rescheduled to Australia Day, but were cancelled again, this time due to a total fire ban. Organizers also halted the practice of launching fireworks from CBD skyscrapers after 2002, due to safety concerns in high winds. The bridge finale that year featured an animated dove along with the word “PEACE” as a unity message.

After six years as creative director, Ignatius Jones stepped down in 2002 to be replaced by former Melbourne and Sydney Festival artistic director Leo Schofield. Ken Wilby moved on the following year with the event's production manager Ed Wilkinson elevated to the producer role from 2003 to 2005.

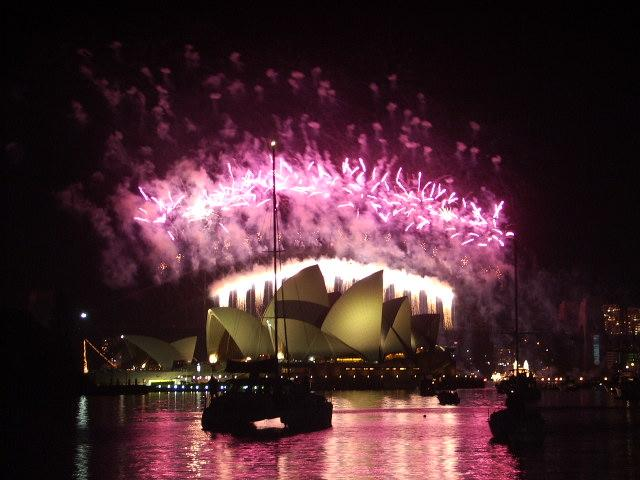
The Sydney Harbour celebrations on NYE 2004.

On NYE 2003, a fifteen-second countdown was accompanied with the striking of a gong at midnight. For the first time, fireworks were launched off the vertical hangers of the bridge in a one-off display that wouldn't be repeated until NYE 2015. From NYE 2004, the first 3D bridge effect was used. Also in that year, the fireworks display was viewed as a disco with pop music and a disco ball suspended from the bridge. The show concluded with a remix of the national anthem "Advance Australia Fair" combined with folk song "Waltzing Matilda". The remix was criticised by politicians; in an interview with 6PR, Prime Minister John Howard stated that he had a "very strong view that the national anthem should be sung and played in a way that facilitates maximum audience participation in its singing", while Leader of the Opposition of New South Wales John Brogden called it '"simply a bad piece of music".

=== 2005–2009 ===
On NYE 2005, a beating heart was the icon on the bridge that appeared after the 9 pm fireworks display. The fireworks themselves during the show exploded in Heart shapes. Former Sydney Theatre Company head Wayne Harrison joined Katrina Marton in taking over leadership of the event as Creative Director and Producer respectively for the events from 2005 to 2007.

NYE 2006 saw the four barges feature for the 9 pm Family Fireworks while six barges feature with the city buildings return for the midnight show and in addition, it had a ten-second countdown projected on the pylons starting with the logo for Network 10. A question mark was shown in the nights leading up to the celebrations, which also doubled up as the curved end of the coat hanger.

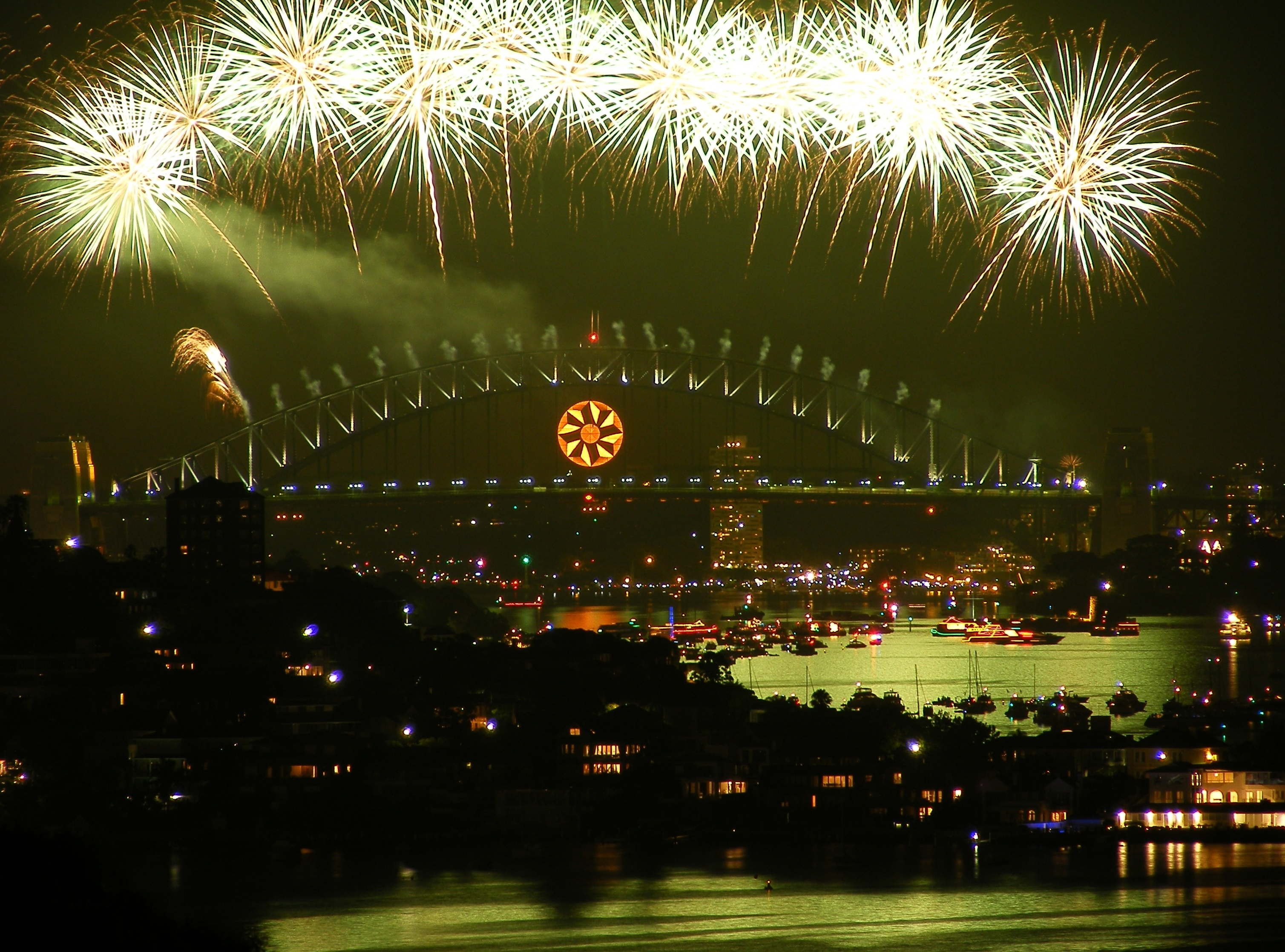
Sydney New Year's Eve 2008–09

In NYE 2007, the bridge acted as a seventh barge for the first time shooting fireworks throughout the show instead of just during the beginning and finale.

In NYE 2008, the bridge, seven city buildings and six barges staged in the biggest fireworks display yet, increasing from $4 million worth of fireworks to $5 million. Brenton Kewley, who had worked on the event since 1996 in various roles, including Art Director and Associate Producer took over as Producer for the 2008 and 2009 events while journalist and broadcaster Rhoda Roberts took over from Wayne Harrison in 2008.

During NYE 2009, the countdown started with messages projected on the pylons. The pyrotechnic countdown was started by launching an exploding mine on a barge in front of the bridge. For the first time, microchip fireworks were used in the show which lasted longer in the sky and were more accurate when synchronised with music. The show consisted of $5 million worth of fireworks running for twelve minutes. A Yin Yang symbol appeared on the bridge during the finale. Once again, more fireworks exploded on the bridge throughout the entire show when compared with previous NYE displays.

=== 2010–2014 ===
The 2010–11 theme was "Make Your Mark", reflecting upon the legacies of the past while entering a new decade. Its bridge effect featured symbols such as a peace sign and X mark; part of the bridge effect was teased on 11 December 2010 as simply an "O", as part of a fireworks display held for a special taping of the American talk show The Oprah Winfrey Show at the Royal Botanic Garden. The show featured over 7,000 kg of pyrotechnics, including new bow tie, "double heart", and lightning bolt effects, and a red and white "checkerboard" waterfall effect on the bridge during the Family Fireworks.

In 2011, Aneurin Coffey took over as Producer having been Production Manager since 2006. 2011 also saw a change from individual creative directors to a creative agency, Imagination Australia, which promoted Marc Newson as creative spokesperson. The theme was "Time to Dream". The display, for the very first time, was choreographed to an all-Australian soundtrack created by music production house s:amplify which included original composition. This marks the first year, a ninety-second countdown was featured on the bridge effect.

In March 2012, Imagination appointed Australian singer Kylie Minogue as creative ambassador for the 2012–13 event, overseeing the soundtrack and visual direction for the event and its official parties. Minogue's involvement was part of her year-long commemoration of 25 years in the music industry. The official theme was "Embrace"; the show's budget increased from $6.3 million to $6.5 million, and the city announced plans for the event to be carbon neutral through the use of biodegradable cases for the firework shells, among other aspects. Foti stated that the event would feature new firework shapes such as bees, butterflies, koalas, and a semiquaver designed for Minogue.

The 2013–14 theme was "Shine"; artist Reg Mombassa served as creative ambassador, and oversaw that year's bridge effect—a giant blinking eye. In addition, the event featured a special minute-long firework display at 10:30 p.m. that was inspired by Mombassa's painting "Cranium Universe".

The theme for the 2014–15 edition was "Inspire"; the budget was reported to have increased from $6.8 million to $7.2 million, and Australian actor Jack Thompson was named the creative ambassador for the show. As part of the theme, viewers were encouraged to post messages on Twitter using the hashtag "#SydNYE" for a chance to have them projected on the bridge pylons. A special display known as the "Inspire moment" was held at 10:40 p.m. The bridge effect was a stylised lightbulb, in honour of the United Nations' declaration of 2015 as the International Year of Light. Out of respect for the Lindt Cafe siege on 15 December, the message "Sydney remembers" was occasionally projected on the pylons.

=== 2015–2019 ===
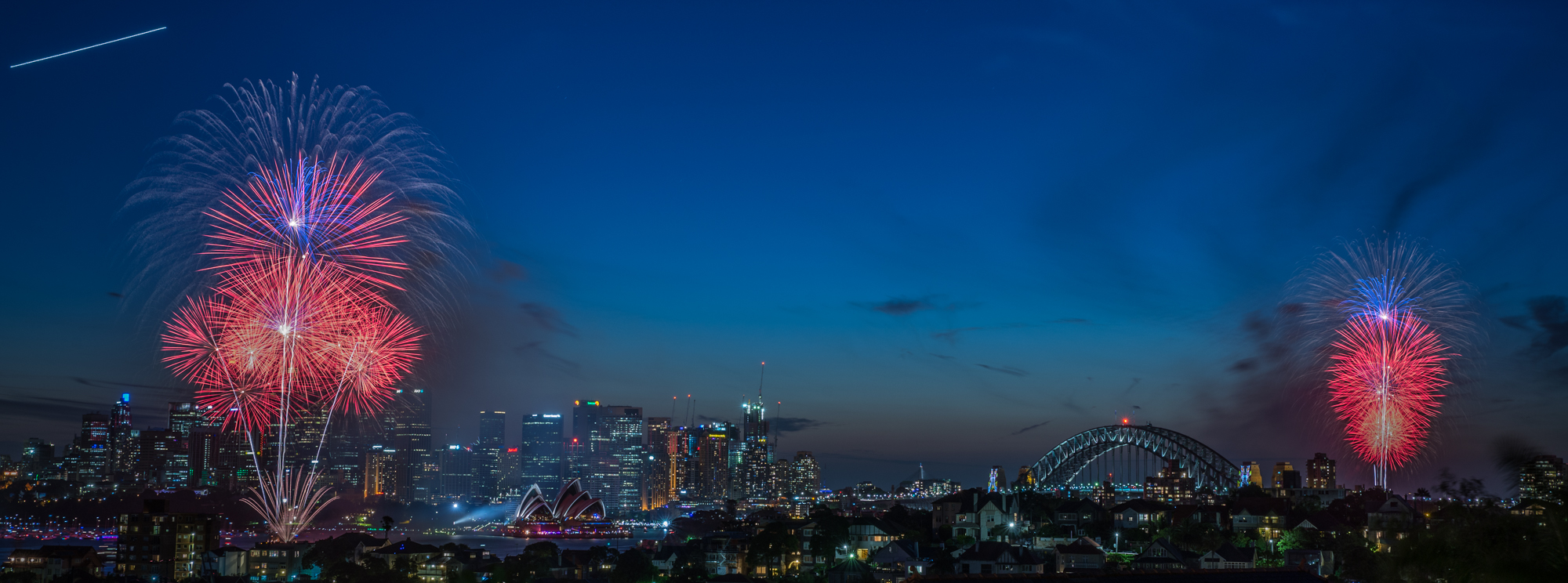
Sydney New Year's Eve fireworks 2015. Taken during the 9 pm display from Mosman (north of Sydney Harbour).

The 2015–16 theme was "City of Colour". For the first time since the practice was introduced, organisers eschewed the lit symbols that had been used as bridge effects, in favour of constructing a larger array of lighting effects utilising the entire bridge. Additionally, a Welcome to Country ceremony was held at sundown prior to the 9 p.m. Family Fireworks, to acknowledge the harbour as territory of the Cadigal, Gamaragal, and Wangal bands of the Eora people. The segment's creative director Rhoda Roberts explained that it would "[celebrate] the connection that Australia’s First Peoples have with the land in a way that’s inclusive and fun": the segment featured projections of Aboriginal imagery on the pylons, as well as lighting and pyrotechnic effects on the bridge that were inspired by the Australian Aboriginal flag.

The 2016–17 theme was "Welcome to SydNYE"; co-producer Catherine Flanagan explained that the theme was about "welcoming everybody to this magical place", particularly tourists. In honour of the 200th anniversary of the Royal Botanic Garden, a papercraft floral sculpture of Sydney Harbour inspired by the event was commissioned from artist Benja Harney, and appeared in promotional material. The welcome to country ceremony added a smoking ceremony conducted by the Tribal Warrior and Mari Nawi boats. Tributes to the musicians Prince and David Bowie were featured during the family and midnight shows respectively, inspired by their songs "Purple Rain" and "Space Oddity". The midnight show also featured a segment that paid tribute to actor Gene Wilder, with candy-shaped firecrackers in a reference to his portrayal of Willy Wonka.

The 2017–18 edition featured a total of eight tonnes of pyrotechnics, and a rainbow flag-coloured waterfall effect to pay tribute to the 40th anniversary of Sydney Mardi Gras, and the 9 December 2017 legalisation of same-sex marriage in Australia. The welcome to country ceremony included a special message from the Muwekma Ohlone community of northern California, in honour of the 50th anniversary of Sydney's sister city relationship with San Francisco.

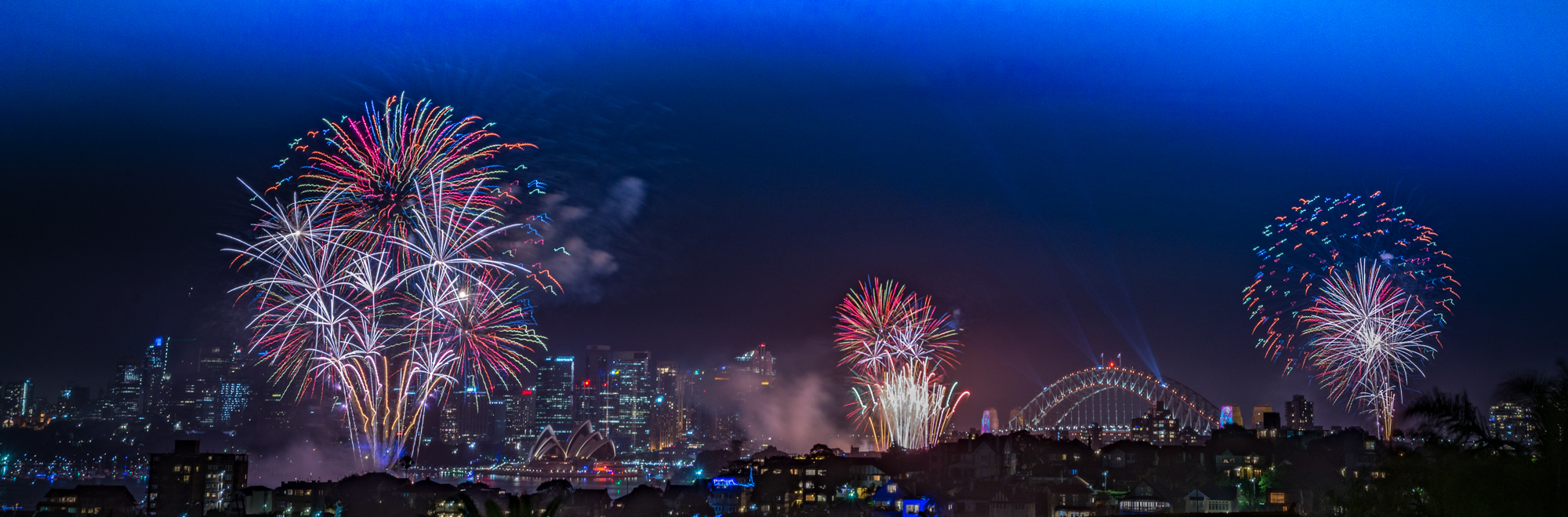
Sydney New Year's Eve celebrations 2018

The theme for 2018–19 was "The Pulse of Sydney", reflected by new pyrotechnic effects that "[pulsate] in dramatic new shapes", and colour effects that "[move] across the display rather than the traditional explosion from the centre of the firework". The show used 8.5 tonnes of pyrotechnics, and also contained a segment paying tribute to American singer Aretha Franklin (who died in August 2018).

Ahead of the 2019–20 edition, organisers unveiled a new visual identity and branding for the event, designed by Garbett Design.

There were calls to cancel the fireworks due to the extreme bushfires across the country, with a petition proposing for their budget to be reallocated to disaster relief purposes. The fires had prompted cancellations and postponements of fireworks celebrations in other areas. The City of Sydney stated that the fireworks would go on as scheduled, but that "if a total fire ban is declared, we will continue to liaise with NSW Government agencies and the NSW Rural Fire Service to determine the safest way to proceed with the event". Fireworks director Fortunato Foti was to also be consulted in the event of high winds. The Rural Fire Service, which granted an exemption to the fire ban for the show, stated that it did not expect "catastrophic" conditions to return on New Year's Eve. Highs of 40 °C (104 °F) were forecast for western Sydney, and special air quality statements were issued in relation to the event.

Sydney officials stated that it would be infeasible to cancel the show, as it would be disruptive to tourists and local business, much of the budget had already been spent, and that there would be "little practical benefit for affected communities". The event's head of audience Tanya Goldberg added that an Australian Red Cross charity appeal would be promoted throughout the event and telecast. Goldberg explained that "the one thing that will help those communities is to go ahead with the event and leverage the power of it to drive people to donate".

=== 2020–2022: COVID-19 impact ===
==== 2020–21 ====
Due to the COVID-19 pandemic in Australia, the 2020–21 edition was scaled back to consist only of a shortened, seven-minute fireworks display at midnight, with the Family Fireworks placed on hiatus. In an interview with 2GB on 24 September, Premier of New South Wales Gladys Berejiklian discussed plans for ticketed attendance at key vantage points for crowd control and social distancing reasons, and remarked of last year's event that Australians "felt relieved that we were still able to have a feeling of normalcy during what was otherwise a very difficult time." The City of Sydney reached an agreement with the state government to grant it "temporary custodianship" of Sydney New Year's Eve.

A two-stage perimeter was established within Sydney's central business district (CBD), Circular Quay, and North Sydney on the evening of the event, with the "yellow zone" being patrolled by police to break up large crowds that violate NSW health orders in regards to gatherings, and the "green zone" (in closer proximity to the harbour) having restricted access by permit only after 5:00 p.m. on New Year's Eve. Permits were only granted to local residents, those who had a confirmed reservation at a hospitality business within a green zone (such as a restaurant or hotel), and employees of businesses within the zone.

To honour their involvement, plans were announced for certain "premium" viewing areas on the foreshore to be reserved exclusively to invited frontline workers. Gladys Berejiklian scrapped the plan on 28 December amid new cases of community transmission in Greater Sydney (which had prompted a localised stay at home order for Sydney's Northern Beaches, and a tightening of restrictions on gatherings elsewhere), stating that there was "too much of a health risk having people from the regions and from Sydney and from broader regional areas congregate all in the CBD". She said that the state government would "find another opportunity during the year to recognise what [they] have done". It was eventually decided that major harbourfront viewing locations in the green zone would be closed to the public; residents were therefore asked to not attend the event in-person, and to watch the television broadcast instead. It was still possible to view the fireworks by boat in Sydney Harbour.

==== 2021–22 ====
In September 2021, amid the Delta variant outbreak, it was reported that the City of Sydney had suspended the Family Fireworks for a second year in a row due to the uncertainty of holding mass gatherings; the decision faced criticism for having been done unilaterally without discussion from councillors and other stakeholders. On 2 October, it was reported that Lord Mayor Clover Moore had sent a letter to Minister of Tourism Stuart Ayres, stating that Sydney New Year's Eve would be held "in a similar way to prior to the pandemic", provided that the NSW government "intensify its critical contribution" to the event. She told The Sydney Morning Herald that "the state government has assured us it will take responsibility for the event or cancel the 9 p.m. fireworks should public health conditions deteriorate." The concerns that led to the initial cancellation included the turnover in audiences between the two shows, and the presence of younger spectators who cannot be vaccinated for COVID-19.

On 9 December 2021, organisers announced that the 2021–22 theme would be "See Sydney Shine", and that the midnight fireworks' soundtrack would be curated by electronic music duo The Presets. The 9:00 p.m. fireworks would now involve Indigenous artists and musicians, with the 2021 show curated by Indigenous artist Blak Douglas. Moore stated that the theme would reflect "the beginning of what we hope will be an entirely new year for us, and for the world." Foti stated that the show would feature new effects to make the Harbour Bridge appear to be "dancing with colour", and a record 2,000 fireworks fired from the Sydney Opera House. For crowd control and contact tracing purposes, vantage points on the foreshore were ticketed. The number of areas requiring paid tickets expanded from "a few" in 2020 to 15, including the Royal Botanic Gardens and Barangaroo.

=== 2023–present ===
The 2022–23 event was stated to be themed around diversity and inclusion, and estimated to include eight tonnes of fireworks launched from Sydney Harbour, Sydney Opera House, Harbour Bridge, and four surrounding buildings. The Family Fireworks featured a performance by Indigenous musicians Akala Newman and Kobie Dee, while the midnight fireworks' soundtrack was curated by Stace Cadet and KLP. A special three-minute projection and light show was held at 11 p.m. to honour the 45th anniversary of Sydney Gay and Lesbian Mardi Gras, hosting WorldPride 2023.

The theme of the 2023–24 event was "One night, many ways to celebrate", with 18yoman and Nooky curating the music for the 9 pm fireworks, The Sweats curating the music for the midnight fireworks, and Sydney-based studio Vandal producing a projection show on the pylons utilizing generative AI imagery. Eight-and-a-half tonnes of fireworks were used over two displays, including fireworks in the shape of whales during the 9 pm fireworks and an effect spelling the word 'Sydney' during the opening segment of the midnight fireworks. The Chris Minns state government abolished nearly all paid viewing sites on Crown land along the foreshore, making them open to the public free of charge. The Royal Botanic Gardens and Taronga Zoo continue to require paid tickets, as their viewings are charity events that benefit the respective institutions. Lord Mayor Moore praised the changes, stating that "creeping commercialisation of State Government public foreshore made it near impossible for many to see the show in person. We have long advocated for the Government to reconsider its decision to charge exorbitant prices to access our public foreshore."

The City of Sydney stated that the 2024–25 event would feature nine tonnes of pyrotechnics launched from eight barges, including an additional 80 firing locations on the western side of the bridge for the first time in the event's history. The two fireworks displays were themed around the Aboriginal historical figure Barangaroo to represent "the deep connection of Eora women to the waterways of Sydney Harbour", with the Calling Country fireworks featuring a soundtrack by Indigenous musician Nooky, and the midnight fireworks featuring projections of an animated depiction of Barangaroo coordinated with the soundtrack by Luna Pan. Lord Mayor Clover Moore stated that the event would feature tributes to "powerful female figures of Australian history", and feature the most women in production and creative roles in the event's history.

On 20 December 2024, amid an industrial action by the Australian Rail Tram and Bus Industry Union (RTBU) in NSW over wages, state police commissioner Karen Webb stated that she had considered recommending to Sydney City Council that the fireworks be cancelled. She cited that the large number of attendees would not be able to return from the event safely if there were a lack of transit options. Lord Mayor Moore stated that the city would work to ensure that the fireworks were still held. RTBU NSW secretary Toby Warnes accused the state government of hyperbole, stating that Sydney Trains had been advised by RTBU that the impact of the action would be negligible with the extra employees working New Year's Eve. On 24 December, RTBU reached an agreement with the NSW government, pledging that any industrial action taken would have minimal impact on summer holiday events in Sydney.

The 2025–26 midnight fireworks featured a soundtrack curated by Jono Ma of Jagwar Ma, entitled "Higher Together". The display featured the most firing points yet, including 6 pyro drones—three positioned on each side of the harbour, and six city rooftops. It also marked the return of the waterfall on the lower arch of the Harbour Bridge for the first time since NYE 2004–05,along with comets fired from the western pylons, which had last been featured in the 2002–03 display. Vandal produced a projection show on the pylons featuring AI-generated animations derived from DNA samples of Australian flora provided by the Royal Botanic Garden, reflecting a concept of "a city [that] gave way to nature." Mental health organisation Beyond Blue was announced as a new charity partner of the event; as a charity appeal, the Harbour Bridge was illuminated in blue during the 10 p.m. hour. Out of respect for the Bondi Beach shooting on 14 December, images of doves and the word "Peace" were projected on the bridge pylons at 9 p.m., and a moment of silence was observed at 11 p.m., during which the bridge was illuminated in white, and attendees were encouraged to shine lights as a show of unity for Australia's Jewish community.

== Bridge effect ==
Central to the firework displays each year since 1999 is the lighting display on the Harbour Bridge known as the "bridge effect". The display showcases a variety of lights, projections and other images related to the current year's theme.

Until 2015/16, the bridge had included a rope light display attached to a framework in the centre of the eastern arch using a panel and truss system, which was used to complement the fireworks, with the display showcasing a variety of symbols and other images related to the year's theme. As the scaffolding and framework were clearly visible for some weeks before the event, revealing the outline of the design, there was much speculation as to how the effect was to be realised. The bridge effect had been designed by Brian Thomson since 2006, with the lighting designed by Mark Hammer since 2008. Since 2016, a more broader light show, covering both the outer and inner arches of the bridge, as well as the deck of the bridge, has been used, after Ziggy Ziegler became the lighting designer for the fireworks from 2015.

Timeline of effects by year
Year	Theme	Effect
1996/97	"Masquerade"	Centrepoint Tower was the focal point for the midnight fireworks
1997/98	"Masquerade"	Smiley face
1998/99	"Masquerade"	Centrepoint Tower was the focal point for the midnight fireworks
1999/2000	"Sydney's Millennium"	The "Eternity" graffito
2000/01	"100 Years as a Nation, Millions of Years as a Land"	Rainbow Serpent and a Federation Star
2001/02	"Of Beauty Rich and Rare: Australia – The Land"	Uluru, and the Southern Cross (supporting effect: Dove of Peace)
2002/03	"The World’s Celebration in Union"	Dove of Peace and the word "PEACE"
2003/04	"City of Light"	Light show on the Sydney Harbour Bridge
2004/05	"Reflections on Australiana"	Disco ball
2005/06	"Heart of the Harbour"	Three concentric hearts
2006/07	"A Diamond Night in Emerald City"	Coathanger and a diamond (supporting effect: question mark)
2007/08	"The Time of Our Lives"	Mandala and an hourglass
2008/09	"Creation"	Sun (supporting effect: eight-pointed star)
2009/10	"Awaken the Spirit"	Yin and yang symbol, blue moon and a ring of fire
2010/11	"Make Your Mark"	X mark, Target and hand print (supporting effects: smiling face, an asterisk, exclamation mark, the peace symbol, analogue clock, a pointer and an archer)
2011/12	"Time to Dream"	Thought bubble and Endless rainbow (supporting effect: Sun)
2012/13	"Embrace"	Butterfly and lip
2013/14	"Shine"	Eye; the Family Fireworks featured an effect of aliens travelling in a spaceship.
2014/15	"Inspire"	Light bulb; the Family Fireworks featured seahorses.
2015/16	"City of Colour"	Light show and projections
2016/17	"Welcome to SydNYE"	Light show and projections
2017/18	"Wonder"	Light show and projections
2018/19	"The Pulse of Sydney"	Light show and projections
2019/20	"Unity"	Light show and projections
2020/21	"We Are One"	Light show and projections
2021/22	"See Sydney Shine"	Light show and projections
2022/23	Diversity and inclusion	Light show and projections
2023/24	"One night, many ways to celebrate"	Light show and projections
2024/25	Barangaroo, women of Australian history	Light show and projections
2025/26	"n/a"	Light show and projections
2026/27	"n/a"	Light show and projections

=== Waterfall effect ===
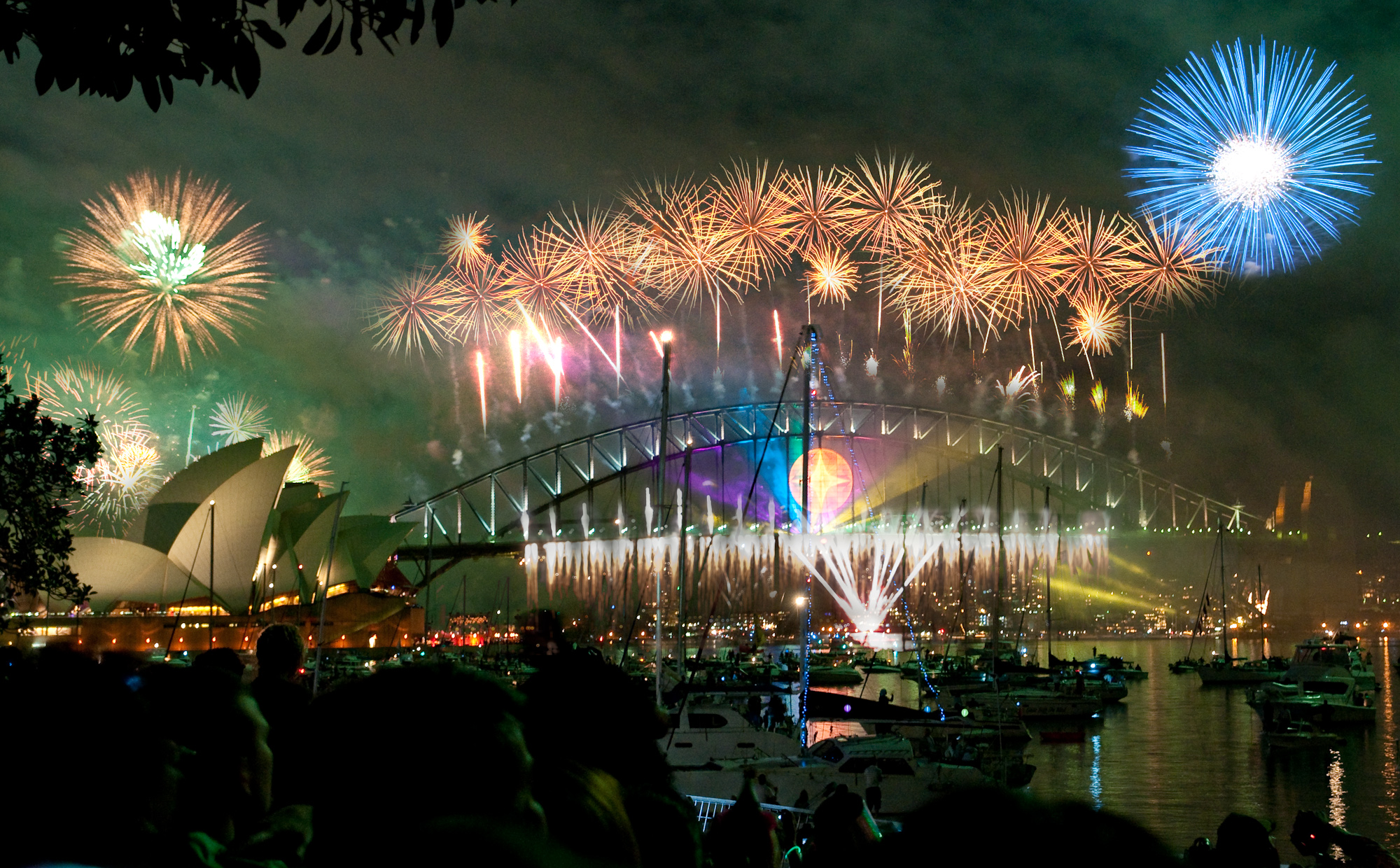
The waterfall effect seen during NYE 2008/09.

A continual stream of fireworks falling from the base of the bridge down to actually touch the water. The waterfall comprises approximately 1,100 candle fireworks. Each year, it has been a traditional golden waterfall.

Some years the waterfall effect has been changed such as on NYE 2000 when the waterfall changed colours from gold to silver. NYE 2000 was also unique in that fireworks were also fired for the first time from the gantry of the bridge.

NYE 2002/03 had a "strobing angelic" waterfall effect where 144 Roman candles released mines and stars that "twinkled". This effect was repeated on NYE 2005 where it changed colour from red to white, on NYE 2006 where it was coloured only green, and in NYE 2020, alongside the usual waterfall.

NYE 2004/05 had the traditional golden waterfall effect except that it slowed crossed the bridge from south to north. This was a difficult set up due to the arch's access but a first of its kind on the bridge with a spectacular "torrent style" waterfall effect.

On NYE 2015, a waterfall with fireworks cascaded during the middle of the family fireworks display.

During NYE 2017/18 a rainbow waterfall cascaded from the Harbour Bridge during the midnight show, celebrating the legalisation of same-sex marriage in Australia. This was repeated on NYE 2022, celebrating Sydney hosting WorldPride in 2023.

The years where the traditional golden waterfall effect has not been featured completely are; NYE 2000 (golden to silver), NYE 2002 (green & white strobing angelic), NYE 2005 (red to white strobing angelic), and NYE 2006 (green strobing angelic). The golden waterfall was to be used again on NYE 2018, however, it failed to ignite as programmed.

On 4 December 2025, it was announced that there will be 2 waterfalls used during the NYE 2025 display; the traditional waterfall running from underneath the bridge, as well as a second waterfall, running down the face of the bridge. However, the traditional waterfall ultimately failed to fire, with only the waterfall running from the lower arch firing.

== Broadcast ==
From 1996 to 2006, the rights to the television broadcast were held by the Nine Network with Richard Wilkins as a host for almost every year and Eddie McGuire and Richard Wilkins as a co-host for the 1999–2000 telecast. From 2006 to 2009, Network Ten was broadcaster after winning a three-year deal from Nine. In 2009, Nine regained the rights back from Ten until 2013. The Australian Broadcasting Corporation (ABC) has held the rights since 2013, with coverage being carried by ABC TV and ABC Australia. On radio, the fireworks' soundtrack is simulcast by KIIS 1065.

The City of Sydney put its Sydney New Year's Eve fireworks coverage to tender following the conclusion of the ABC's two-year contract, with the broadcaster having continued as broadcaster since. The 2015 fireworks were the first to utilise drone-mounted cameras for additional angles, and since 2016, an official international webcast has been streamed on platforms such as Facebook.

The ABC's tenure as rightsholder has faced mixed reception; its first telecast for 2013–14 telecast was described as a "train wreck" by viewers, with criticism over flirtatious remarks made by the presenters and offensive comments about public figures, and suspicions by viewers that the presenters were intoxicated. The ABC defended the broadcast, stating that its team had done a "terrific job" given the circumstances, and stated that the number of formal complaints it received from viewers was "not extraordinary for program with an audience of this size". During the 2014–15 telecast, co-host Julia Zemiro was caught on a hot mic saying "oh, thank God" at the conclusion of the broadcast. The 2015–16 broadcast was criticised by viewers on social media (including calls for the rights to move back to the Nine Network), though that year's pub quiz was praised, with viewers being complimentary of host Lawrence Mooney. From 2017/2018, Charlie Pickering and Zan Rowe hosted the concert, with Jeremy Fernandez and Linda Marigliano also presenting in 2020/2021, and Concetta Caristo co-hosting from 2023/24.

Broadcast networks and presenters by year
Year	Broadcaster	Host(s)
1996/97	Nine Network	Richard Wilkins; Catriona Rowntree
1997/98	Nine Network	Richard Wilkins; Kim Watkins
1998/99	Nine Network	Richard Wilkins; Hugh Jackman
1999/2000	Nine Network	Richard Wilkins; Eddie McGuire
2000/01	Nine Network	Richard Wilkins
2001/02	Nine Network	Richard Wilkins; Vince Sorrenti
2002/03; 2003/04; 2004/05; 2005/06	Nine Network	Richard Wilkins
2006/07	Network 10	Gretel Killeen; Daniel MacPherson
2007/08; 2008/09	Network 10	Kim Watkins; Osher Günsberg
2009/10	Nine Network	Leila McKinnon; Cameron Williams
2010/11	Nine Network	Alicia Loxley; Michael Usher
2011/12	Nine Network	Jesinta Franklin; Cameron Williams; Jaynie Seal
2012/13	Nine Network	Catriona Rowntree; Jason Dundas
2013/14	ABC TV; ABC Australia	Lawrence Mooney; Stephanie Brantz
2014/15	ABC TV; ABC Australia	Julia Zemiro; Toby Truslove
2015/16	ABC TV; ABC Australia	Eddie Perfect; Ella Hooper
2016/17	ABC TV; ABC Australia	Jeremy Fernandez; Ella Hooper
2017/18; 2018/19; 2019/20	ABC TV; ABC Australia	Charlie Pickering; Zan Rowe
2020/21	ABC TV; ABC Australia	Charlie Pickering; Zan Rowe; Jeremy Fernandez; Linda Marigliano
2021/22; 2022/23	ABC TV; ABC Australia	Charlie Pickering; Zan Rowe; Jeremy Fernandez
2023/24; 2024/25	ABC TV; ABC Australia	Charlie Pickering; Zan Rowe; Concetta Caristo
2025/26	ABC TV; ABC Australia	Charlie Pickering; Zan Rowe
