= St Barnabas Anglican Church, Broadway =

St Barnabas' Anglican Church
- Barneys
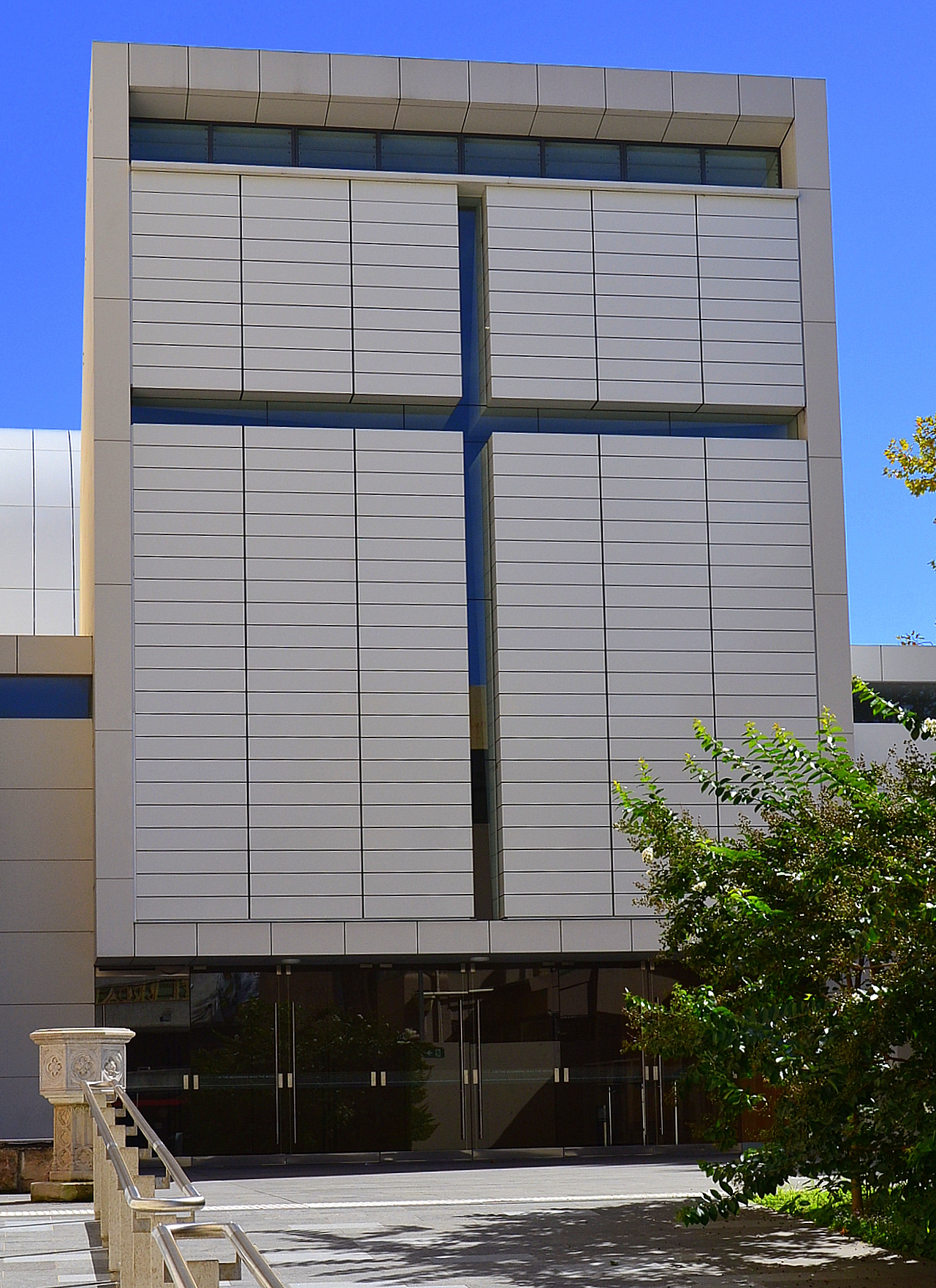
- The new church, completed in 2012
- St Barnabas' Anglican Church
- 33°53′01″S 151°11′46″E
- Address: Broadway, Ultimo, New South Wales
- Country: Australia
- Denomination: Anglican
- Website: barneys.org.au

History
- Status: Church
- Dedication: Saint Barnabas

Architecture
- Functional status: Active
- Architect: Francis-Jones Morehen Thorpe
- Architectural type: Church
- Style: International modernist
- Years built: 2010–2012

Administration
- Diocese: Sydney
- Parish: Broadway

St Barnabas' Anglican Church (destroyed)
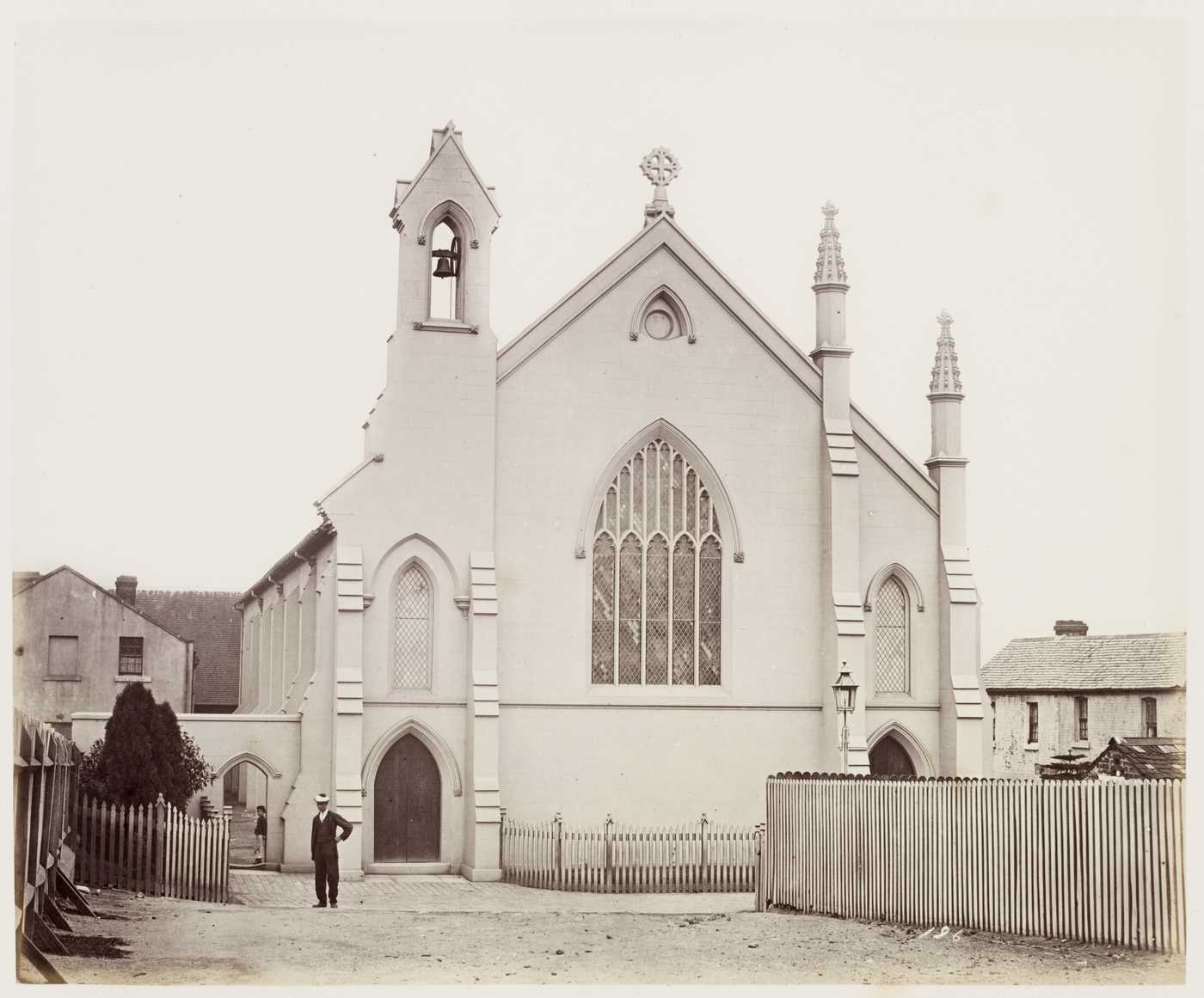
- St Barnabas' Anglican Church in 1872
- St Barnabas' Anglican Church (destroyed)
- Country: Australia
- Previous denomination: Anglican

History
- Status: Church (destroyed)
- Founded: 1858
- Dedication: Saint Barnabas

Architecture
- Functional status: Destroyed
- Architect: unknown
- Architectural type: Church (1858 – 2006)
- Style: Gothic Revival
- Years built: 1858
- Closed: 10 May 2006
- Demolished: 2010

St Barnabas' Anglican Church, Broadway, is an Anglican church in the Diocese of Sydney, New South Wales, Australia. The church is located on Broadway, near the University of Sydney and University of Technology in the Sydney suburb of Ultimo.

Commonly called "Barneys", the church is well known in Sydney for its church signs, including a celebrated "battle" with the publican across Broadway. The church would put up one sign and the hotel would have another with a witty reply to the church's sign. Some of the signs attracted the attention of the Sydney media.

== History ==
Built by slum labourers in the Inner West region of Sydney, the foundation stone for the building was laid in 1858. Much later, some of the land in front of the church was sold and became the site of a commercial building in the Beaux-Arts style.

Arthur Stace, the "Eternity" man, was a member of the church.

=== 2006: fire and destruction ===
A fire ravaged the church building at 3.30 am on 10 May 2006. It took firefighters around eight hours to completely contain the fire. Destroyed in the fire were a 100-year-old pipe organ, a historic stained-glass window (valued in the media at over a million dollars) and memorials to parishioners who died in World War I.

The investigation concluded that the fire was probably started at the power box. No accelerants were found, indicating that arson was not a cause.

=== 2010: demolition of old church building and rebuilding ===
The old church building was demolished in 2010 and the new building, designed by Sydney architects Francis-Jones Morehen Thorp, was opened in June 2012.

The new church building also houses a social community centre and creche. It was awarded a High Commendation (buildings of religion) at the 2013 World Architecture Festival in Singapore and the 2013 International Architecture Award.

== "Eternity" ==
Arthur Stace, a member of the congregation, attracted attention for writing the word "eternity" in chalk on the streets of Sydney from the 1940s through to the 1960s in a distinctive copperplate style. "Eternity" was featured on the Sydney Harbour Bridge during the 2000 New Year's celebrations.

A documentary about Stace, called Eternity, by Lawrence Johnston was released in 1994.

== Battle of the signs ==
R. B. S. Hammond began the weekly ritual of the St. Barnabas message board. His witty and often thought provoking messages were what made St Barnabas famous. Some include; "Drink and trouble are like petrol and fire", "Alcohol makes your mind stagger long before your feet do", "Do not nurse a grievance, teach it to walk" and "Divorce is the hash we make from domestic scraps". Continuing on the tradition was Robert Forsyth, who found that he had competition from Arthur Elliot, publican of the nearby pub, Broadway Hotel. The two noticeboards would often display subtle wordplay, including the following:

- St Barnabas: "This church is for sinners"
  - Broadway Hotel: "This pub is for drinkers"
- St Barnabas: "Money does not make you happy"
  - Broadway Hotel: "I'd rather be rich and happy than poor and happy"
- St Barnabas: "God made sex for marriage not for money"
  - Broadway Hotel: "Wish he had made money for marriage"
- St Barnabas: "Free Grace brothers and sisters" (St Barnabas was next to a Grace Bros store)
  - Broadway Hotel: "Free David Jones too" (referring to another Australian department store)
- St Barnabas: "The best things in life aren't things"
  - Broadway Hotel: "Things are not all what they seem to be"

Nowadays and perhaps somewhat ironically, after some services, particularly the later services, parishioners share fellowship with each other at the pub opposite St. Barnabas.

== Ministry ==
The senior minister since 2010 is the Reverend Mike Paget. Other senior ordained staff include Jason Cheng, Erica Hamence and Rhys Duggan. St Barnabas' also employs a music director, Steve Crain, and a substantial ministry team.

Previous ministers at the church include:

| Officeholder | Term start | Term end | Time in office | Notes |
|---|---|---|---|---|
| Ian Powell | | | | Evangelist |
| W. A. Charlton | 13 February 1901 | | | |
| R. B. S. Hammond OBE | 1918 | 1943 | 24–25 years | Started the tradition of the Church's signs |
| Howard Guinness | | | | Student ministry pioneer who was related to Arthur Guinness, founder of Guinness beer. |
| Paul Barnett AM | | | | Christian scholar, historian and bishop |
| Peter Jensen | 1969 | 1976 | 6–7 years | subsequently Archbishop of Sydney |
| Robert Forsyth | 1983 | 2000 | 16–17 years | subsequently Bishop of South Sydney |
| Mike Paget | 12 August 2010 | incumbent | 16 years, 96 days | |

== Gallery ==
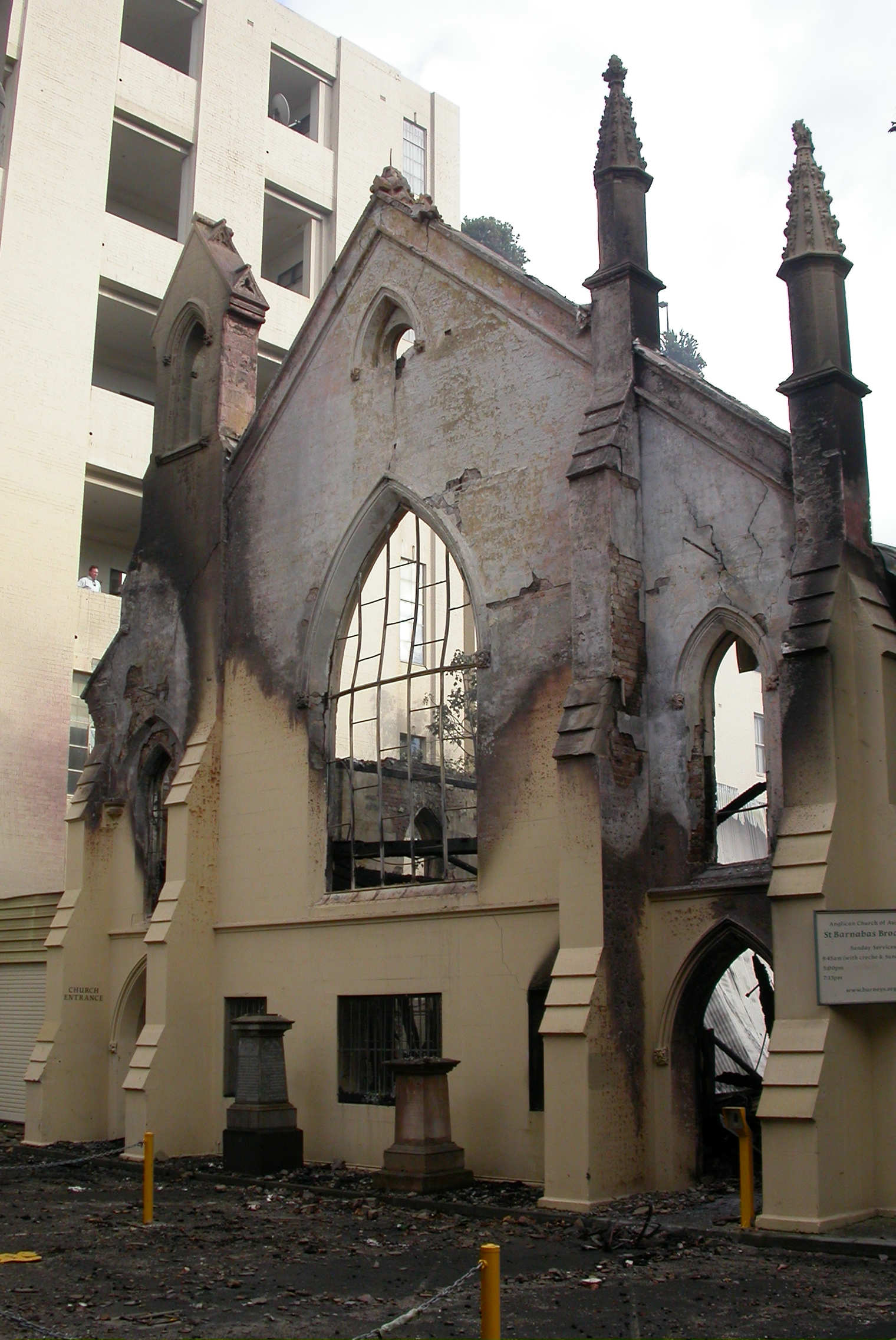
Church the morning after the fire

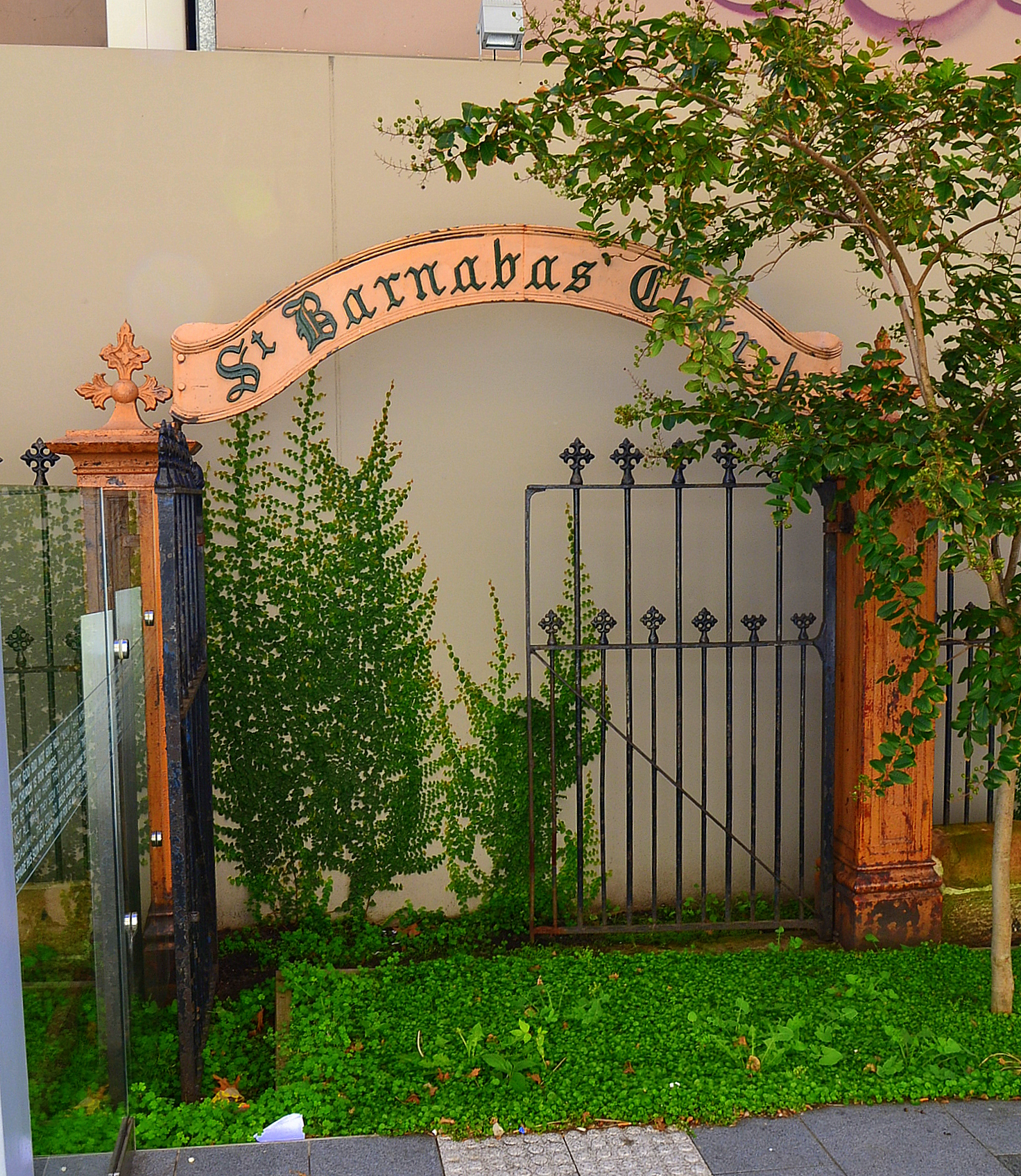
Some of the remains of the old church

== See also ==
- Australian non-residential architectural styles
- List of Anglican churches in the Diocese of Sydney
