= HammondCare =

- Founded: November 20, 1932; 93 years ago in Hammondville, New South Wales
- Founder: Robert Brodribb Hammond
- Type: Not-for-profit
- Purpose: Aged care; Dementia caregiving
- Headquarters: St Leonards, New South Wales
- Region served: Australia
- CEO: Andrew Thorburn
- Subsidiaries: Hope Health & Care Services
- Website: hammond.com.au

HammondCare is an Australian not-for-profit independent Christian provider of aged care, dementia care and palliative care services in residential, home, community and hospital settings. They also provide a federally-funded nationwide dementia consulting service, Dementia Support Australia (DSA).

== History ==
HammondCare was established in 1932 during the Great Depression when thousands of poverty-stricken rent-paying families were evicted from their inner-Sydney homes. In response to this crisis, Anglican Archdeacon Robert Brodribb Hammond (also known as Rev Bob Hammond) used his own funds to purchase land near Liverpool, which was later named as Hammondville. Families who were homeless or facing homelessness from eviction were offered an opportunity to rent-purchase a home on this pioneer settlement, providing them with stability and independence through home ownership.

In 1995, HammondCare opened its first small household or cottage dementia care home and also founded the Dementia Centre in Australia (and more recently in the UK) as a provider of dementia-related research, development and support services. 1995 also saw the appointment of Stephen Judd as CEO.

HammondCare Head Office is located in St Leonards, NSW with local offices located with residential care homes and other health, aged and dementia care services throughout Australia.

In 2021, HammondCare partnered with Coles Supermarkets to build mini, dementia-friendly supermarkets within their care homes nationally.

The University of Sydney announced partnership with HammondCare in March 2022 to shape the sector through collaboration on research, education and social impact.

== Services ==
- Residential Aged Care
- Home Care
- Healthcare and Hospitals
- The Dementia Centre and Dementia Support Australia
- Rehabilitation
- Palliative Care
