= Hammondville, New South Wales =

Hammondville
- Suburb
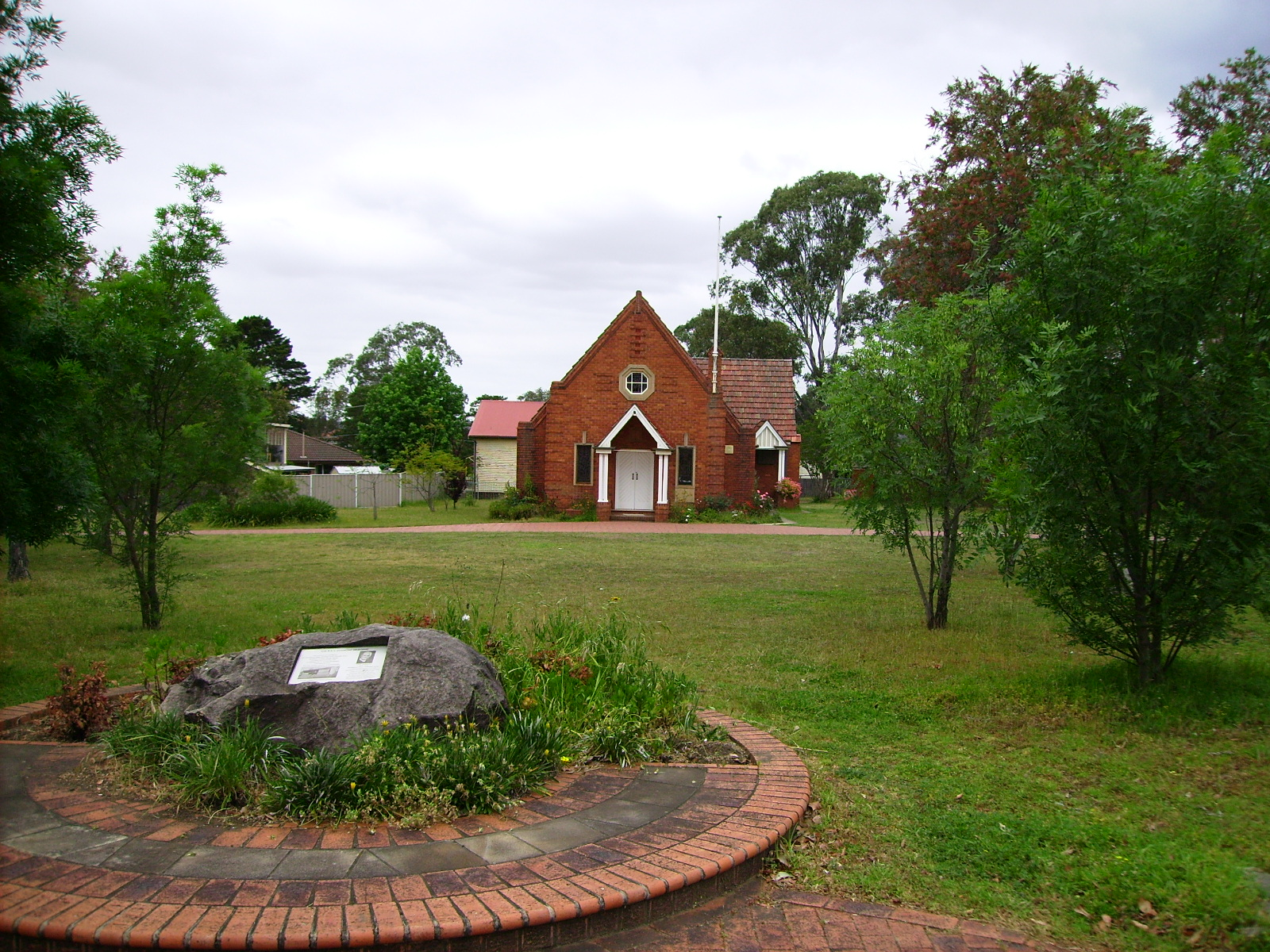

- Interactive map of Hammondville
- Coordinates: 33°57′03″S 150°57′27″E
- Country: Australia
- State: New South Wales
- City: Sydney
- LGA: Liverpool
- Location: 31 km (19 mi) SW of Sydney CBD
- Established: 1933

Government
  - State electorate: Holsworthy
  - Federal division: Hughes

Area
  - Total: 1.9 km^{2} (0.73 sq mi)
- Elevation: 25 m (82 ft)

Population
  - Total: 3,691 (2021 census)
  - Density: 1,940/km^{2} (5,030/sq mi)
- Postcode: 2170
Suburbs around Hammondville
Moorebank	Moorebank	Milperra
Wattle Grove	Hammondville	Milperra
Wattle Grove	Holsworthy	Voyager Point

Hammondville is a suburb in south-western Sydney, in the state of New South Wales, Australia. Hammondville is located 31 kilometres south-west of the Sydney central business district in the local government area of the City of Liverpool.

== History ==
Hammondville was originally a settlement for destitute families during the Great Depression. It was founded in 1933 by minister and social reformer Robert Brodribb Hammond from St Barnabas at Broadway close to the city centre of Sydney. Former senator George Matthew Foster served as general superintendent and secretary. The Hammondville Post Office opened on 15 April 1935. A Hammondville East Post Office opened on 1 May 1958 and closed in 1983.

== Population ==
At the 2021 census, there were 3,691 residents in Hammondville. 69.4% of people were born in Australia, with the top other countries of birth being England 2.7%, New Zealand 1.9% and India 1.5%. About 29.2% of people spoke a language other than English at home and the most common languages spoken were Arabic 4.9%, Greek 2.6% and Spanish 1.3%. The most common responses for religion were Catholic 23.4%, No Religion 18.9% and Anglican 17.2%.

== Recreation ==
Hammondville has soccer and football fields, netball courts, baseball diamonds and cricket nets along Heathcoate Road at Hammondville Park. Hammondville Park also has Moorebank Sports Club, a popular club for the locals. The suburb also sits alongside the New Brighton Golf Club.

== Parks ==
Hammondville has many small pocket parks with children's playgrounds. In 1988, the Lieutenant Cantello Reserve was unveiled by the citizens of Bankstown in the Bicentennial Project. Located on the eastern side of the village the memorial stands in memory of Lt George Leo Cantello who died in a plane crash whilst defending Australia on 8 June 1942.
