= Robert Brodribb Hammond =

Australian Anglican priest and social reformer (1870–1946)

The Venerable Canon Robert Brodribb Hammond O.B.E.
- Archdeacon of Redfern
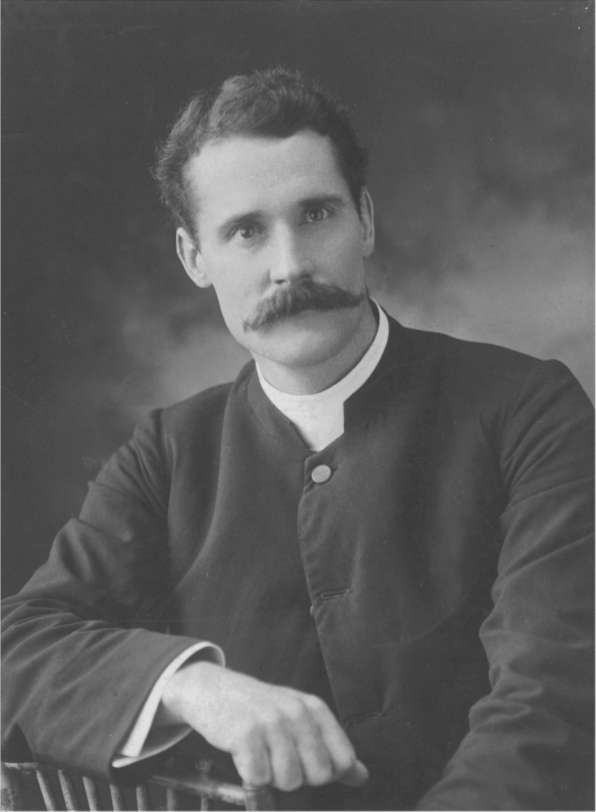
- Hammond c. 1899
- Church: Church of England in Australia and Tasmania
- Diocese: Anglican Diocese of Sydney

Orders
- Ordination: 1894 (diaconate); 1896 (priesthood)

Personal details
- Born: 12 June 1870 Brighton, Victoria
- Died: 12 May 1946 (aged 75) Beecroft, New South Wales
- Denomination: Anglican

Robert Brodribb Hammond (12 June 1870 – 12 May 1946) was an Australian clergyman and social reformer. Hammond was known for his work as an evangelist in Sydney's working class suburbs and for operating large-scale poverty relief efforts during the 1920s and 1930s. Between 1904 and 1911, Hammond served as organising missioner of the Mission Zone Fund and established a successful ministry in the working class suburbs of inner-city Sydney. Hammond was a particularly fierce advocate of temperance, serving as president of the Australasian Temperance Society between 1916 and 1941. In 1918, Hammond became rector of St Barnabas' Anglican Church, where he continued his work as an evangelist and established one of Sydney's largest social relief programs. During the Great Depression his programs served over 250,000 meals each year and housed thousands of the homeless at eight Hammond Hotels and five Hammond Family Hostels across Sydney. In 1931 he was elected Canon of St Andrew's Cathedral, and in 1939 he was appointed Archdeacon of Redfern.

One of Hammond's achievements was the establishment of Hammondville, a settlement built on Sydney's fringes for unemployed families during the Great Depression. Hammond bought a tract of uncleared bushland outside of Liverpool and built simple cottages, allowing unemployed families with three or more children to move to the community on a rent-purchase basis. The original community operated by Hammond's Pioneer Homes would eventually house 110 families and was home to a primary school, community centre, shops and a post office. The settlement would eventually grow into the suburb of Hammondville, which still bears Hammond's name. His charity eventually became HammondCare after his death, and continues to operate as an independent Christian charity operating aged care centres and health services.

== Early life and education ==
Hammond was born on 12 June 1870 in Brighton, Victoria to Robert Kennedy Hammond, a stock and station agent, and Jessie Duncan (née Grant). He was the seventh of ten children. He attended Melbourne Church of England Grammar School, where he was school captain and excelled as a footballer.

In 1891, he decided to dedicate his life to the church after hearing the visiting Irish priest George C Grubb speak. He was made a deacon on 20 May 1894 and was ordained as a priest in the Church of England in Australia and Tasmania, now known as the Anglican Church of Australia, in 1896.

== Ministry ==
Hammond began his ministry in Melbourne and Gippsland. He ministered in Omeo from 1894 to 1897, at St Mary's in Caulfield from 1897 to 1898, and in Walhalla in 1898. In 1899 he moved to Sydney and briefly ministered at St Mary's in Balmain before becoming curate of St Philip's Church Hill in 1901.

While at St Philip's, Hammond married Jean Marion Anderson on 9 June 1904. In June 1905 they had a son, Bert — the Hammonds' only child — who died at the age of just four weeks.

=== Mission Zone Fund ===
Between 1904 and 1911, Hammond was the organising missioner of the Mission Zone Fund, part of the Anglican Home Mission Society, and ministered to the poor in the working-class suburbs of inner-city Sydney. Hammond preached temperance and placed an emphasis on providing for the needs of the poor. Historian Meredith Lake argues that Hammond's emphasis on both spiritual and material aid blurred the division between those in the Anglican church at the time who believed that poverty was the cause of vices like alcoholism, and those who believed that vice was the cause of poverty. Lake also observes that Hammond was particularly successful in reaching out to working-class men, helping to counter the increasing predominance of women in religious congregations during this period. Later in his life, Hammond reflected:

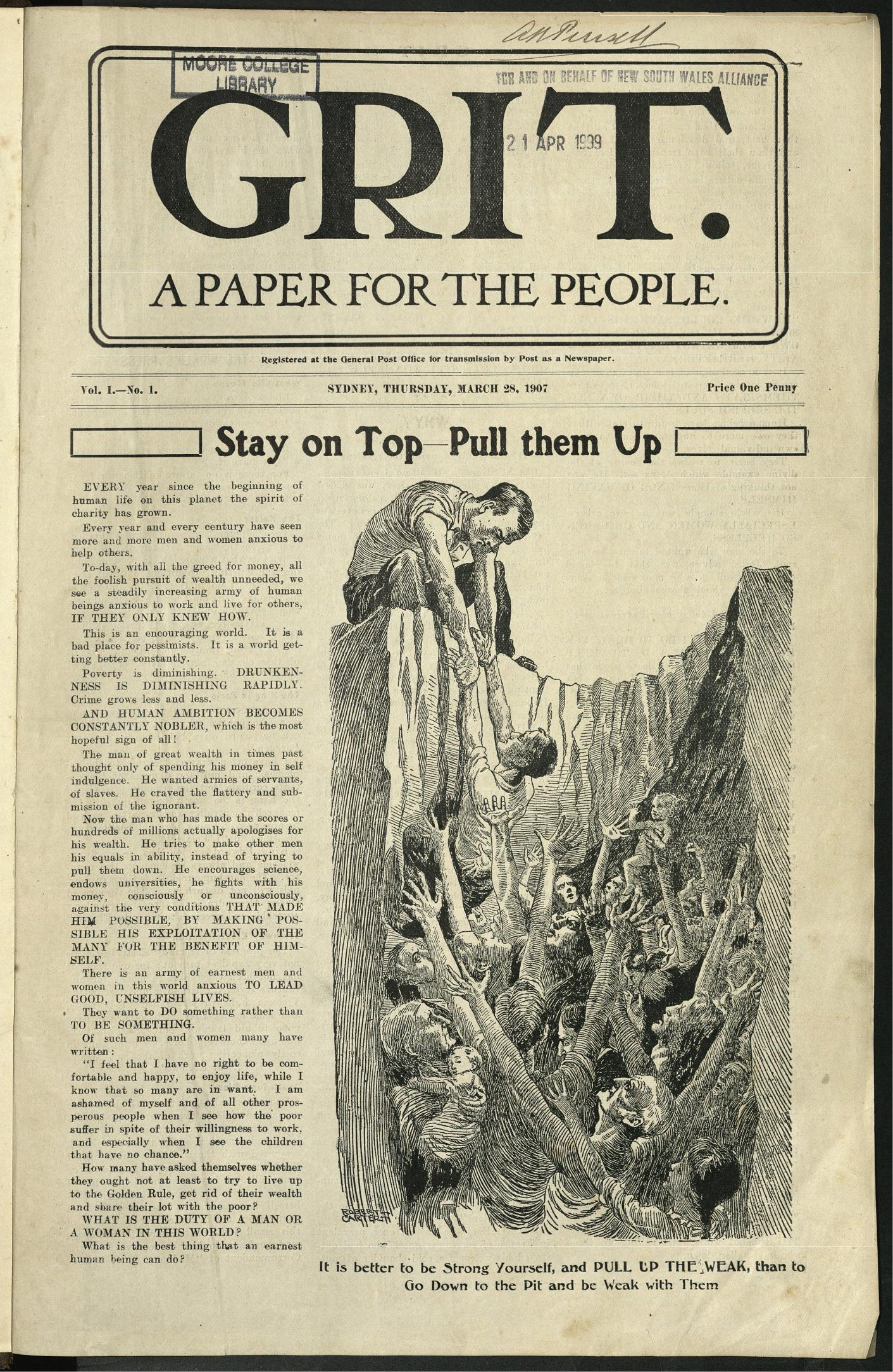
Cover of the first issue of Grit, edited by Hammond between 1907 and 1942

I became convinced that the religious problem of today was not 'Why don't men go to church?' but 'Why does the church not go to the men?' It was not my business what other clergy did or left undone, but it was most emphatically my business to practice the teaching of the Master who 'was kind to the unthankful and the evil' and gave us the wonderful story of the Shepherd seeking the one lost sheep. I became very unhappy about the vast company of men who never darkened the door of the church.

Hammond substantially increased attendance at Sunday services in Surry Hills and conducted regular open-air and factory services. Hammond was a particularly fierce advocate for temperance, and in 1907 founded a weekly publication advocating for temperance and hard work, Grit, that he would edit until 1942.

By 1911, Hammond was increasingly coming into conflict with the Mission Zone Fund's parent organisation, the Home Mission Society. Other members of the Home Mission Society felt that the organisation's focus should remain on evangelism and that poverty relief should be left to other organisations. Hammond's success also meant that the Mission Zone Fund was beginning to outgrow its parent organisation. In 1911, Hammond resigned from the Mission Zone Fund and continued his work from his parish at St Simon's and St Jude's in Surry Hills, where he had served as rector since 1908. From 1913 he was also rector of St David's in Surry Hills.

=== St Barnabas Church ===
In 1918 Hammond moved to St Barnabas' Church on George Street. At the time of his arrival, the population of the parish had fallen from 26,000 to around 2000 following the closure of the abattoirs located at Blackwattle Bay, and the possibility of selling the church had begun to be broached. In 1914 a sub-committee of the church had proposed selling the church and an ordinance for its sale had been prepared.

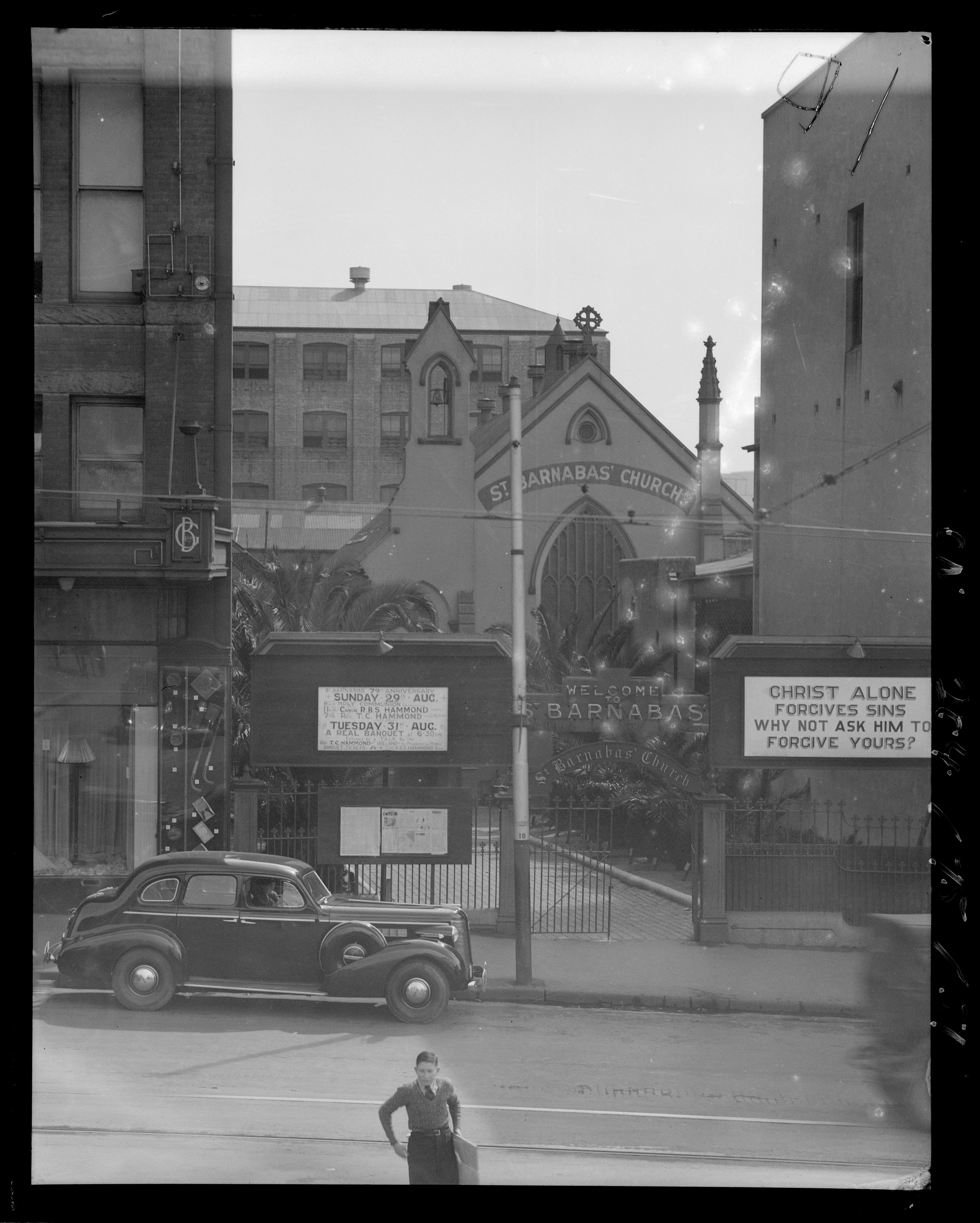
St Barnabas' Church, pictured in August 1937.

Hammond revitalised the parish, introducing a Wednesday night men's meeting and a "Brotherhood of Christian Men". The Wednesday night meetings attracted 200–300 people each week and the Brotherhood's membership increased from 431 in 1923 to more than 4000 in 1943. Hammond also operated an employment centre, a soup kitchen, and other social service initiatives from St Barnabas'. Prior to the onset of the Great Depression, the church was spending around £1000 each year (equivalent to $79,000 in 2022) on poverty relief efforts, more than any other parish or Anglican church agency at the time. Hammond had a staff of 70 operating these initiatives at St Barnabas', mostly made up of volunteers.

From 1912, Hammond personally visited the "drunks' yard" at the Central Police Court each night and spoke to up to 100,000 men to preach temperance, about 20,000 of whom agreed to sign an abstinence pledge. In 1925, 8000 men joined Hammond’s church following these visits. One of these men was the prominent graffiti artist Arthur Stace, also known as "Eternity man". Hammond would serve as president of the Australasian Temperance Society from 1916 to 1941 and as president of the New South Wales alliance from 1916 to 1925.

Hammond's relief efforts expanded in the 1930s as the Great Depression gripped Australia. Hammond had established his first "Hammond Hotel" to provide accommodation for unemployed single men in a disused warehouse in Newtown in 1908. This was followed by hotels in Chippendale, Surry Hills and near the Darling Harbour docks. By 1933 there were eight hotels that housed 1000 men over the course of the year. The Chippendale hotel, Hammond's largest, housed more than 300 men in a former factory. Hammond also opened five Hammond Family Hostels to accommodate the increasing number of homeless families in Sydney during the Great Depression. In 1934, these hostels housed 114 families. During the Great Depression, the relief initiatives at St Barnabas' also served around 250,000 meals each year and distributed more than 20,000 pieces of clothing and 1200 pieces of furniture. The various initiatives at St Barnabas' were eventually incorporated into a registered charity named Hammond's Social Services.

== Hammondville ==
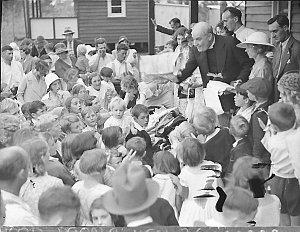
Hammond handing out items to a crowd of children at Hammondville, December 1935.

In 1932, Hammond established a new settlement for unemployed families outside Liverpool on Sydney's south-western fringe. This was in response to an eviction crisis spurred by the Great Depression; in 1932 alone, the courts in New South Wales had evicted more than 5800 families. In late 1931, Hammond had already begun to offer building materials to homeless families with access to land, which led to the construction of 21 "experimental" homes in regional areas across the state of New South Wales. In 1932, he cashed in his life insurance policy to contribute towards the purchase of land outside Liverpool to establish a Pioneer Homes scheme. The scheme would allow any family with three or more children and an unemployed father to rent-purchase a home and an acre of land in a new settlement named Hammondville. Families would be charged £25 for the land and £75 for the home, interest-free, meaning that residents could own their homes within around seven years. Hammond was motivated both by the homelessness crisis and by a desire to put men to meaningful work. He told the Sydney Morning Herald in 1932: "I am seeking to connect idle families with idle plots of land, to set them working for themselves since there is no-one else to work for".

On 12 February 1932, Hammond held a meeting at St Barnabas' for families to express interest in the Pioneer Homes scheme. The scheme attracted immediate interest; Hammond received 600–800 expressions of interest at the February meeting, and hundreds more by mail afterwards. The scheme proved controversial, and was criticised by some conservative leaders and members of the middle class for its potential to foster radicalism. Hammond responded that the scheme would prove to be a "most practical obstacle to communism" by allowing unemployed families to achieve home ownership and by cultivating independent, hard-working citizens.

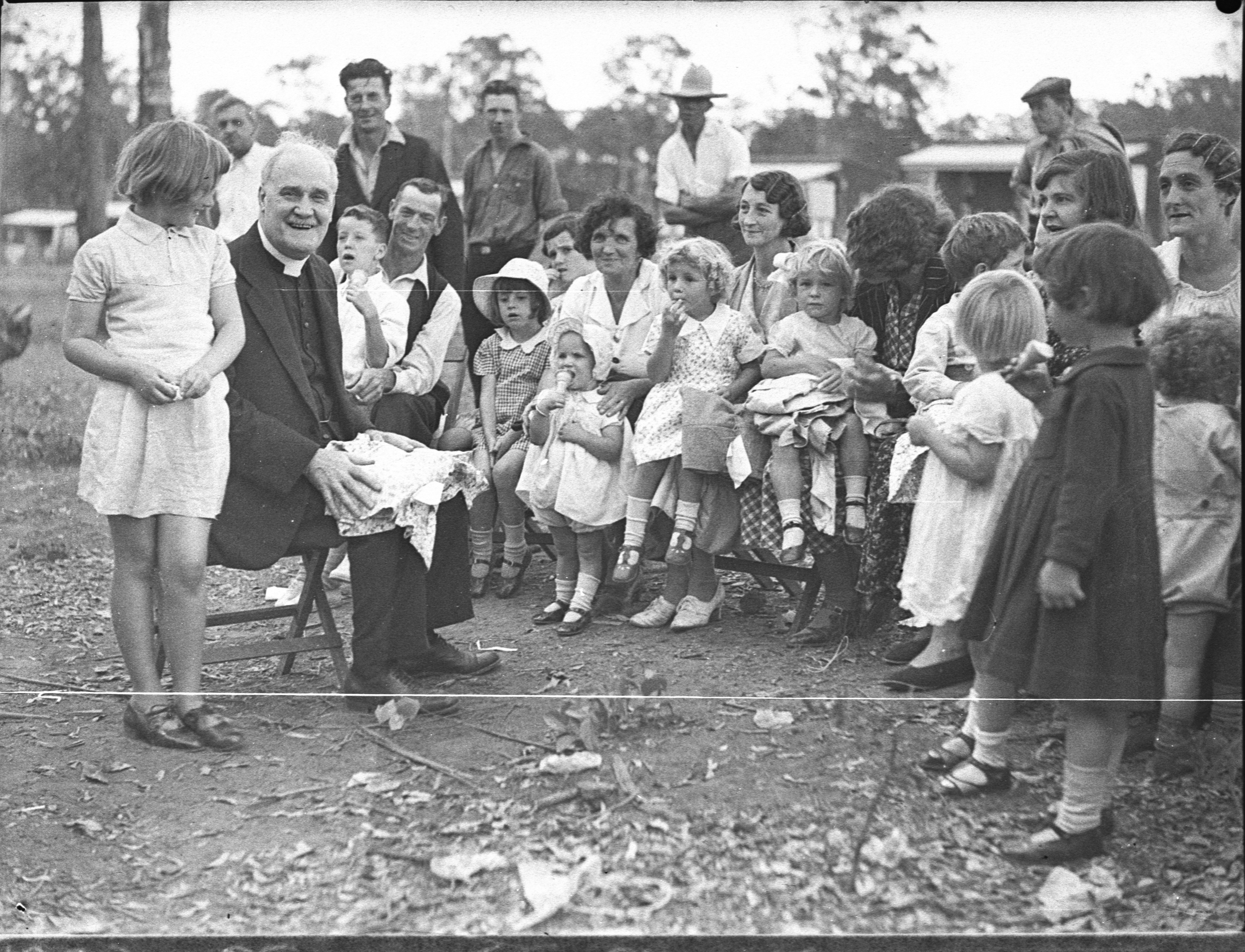
Hammond sitting with a group of children at Hammondville, December 1935

In September 1932, Hammond purchased 5.3 hectares of bushland 5 kilometres outside of Liverpool. A group of tradesmen from one of his Hammond Hotels spent the next two months clearing the land and building an initial nine homes. These first Pioneer Homes were officially opened on 20 November 1932, with Minister for Commerce Frederick Stewart, Minister for Agriculture Hugh Main and Governor of New South Wales Philip Game in attendance. The initial homes were simple wooden cottages that lacked both electricity and running water, with running water not installed for another two years. An influx of donations soon allowed Hammond to purchase an adjoining tract of land in January 1933. He sold part of the new land to the Department of Education to establish a primary school, which opened to students in 1933. By 1934 there were 50 homes, shops, a post office and a community hall in Hammondville.

In 1933, Hammond established an independent charity for the project named Hammond's Pioneer Homes. Samuel Walder and Frederick Stewart joined Hammond as directors. While the state and federal governments had initially been reluctant to support the charity, in 1934 the New South Wales government finally offered £1000 in building materials. In 1937, the government made another offer of £10,000, but with the condition that £6000 must be spent on building a new rental-only community for "problem" unemployed families, with families "found to be deserving of better conditions" eventually being given the option to move to Hammondville. Hammond rejected the offer, believing that it would sacrifice the charity's independence and would compromise its commitment to providing residents with a path to home ownership, and eventually received a much smaller government grant.

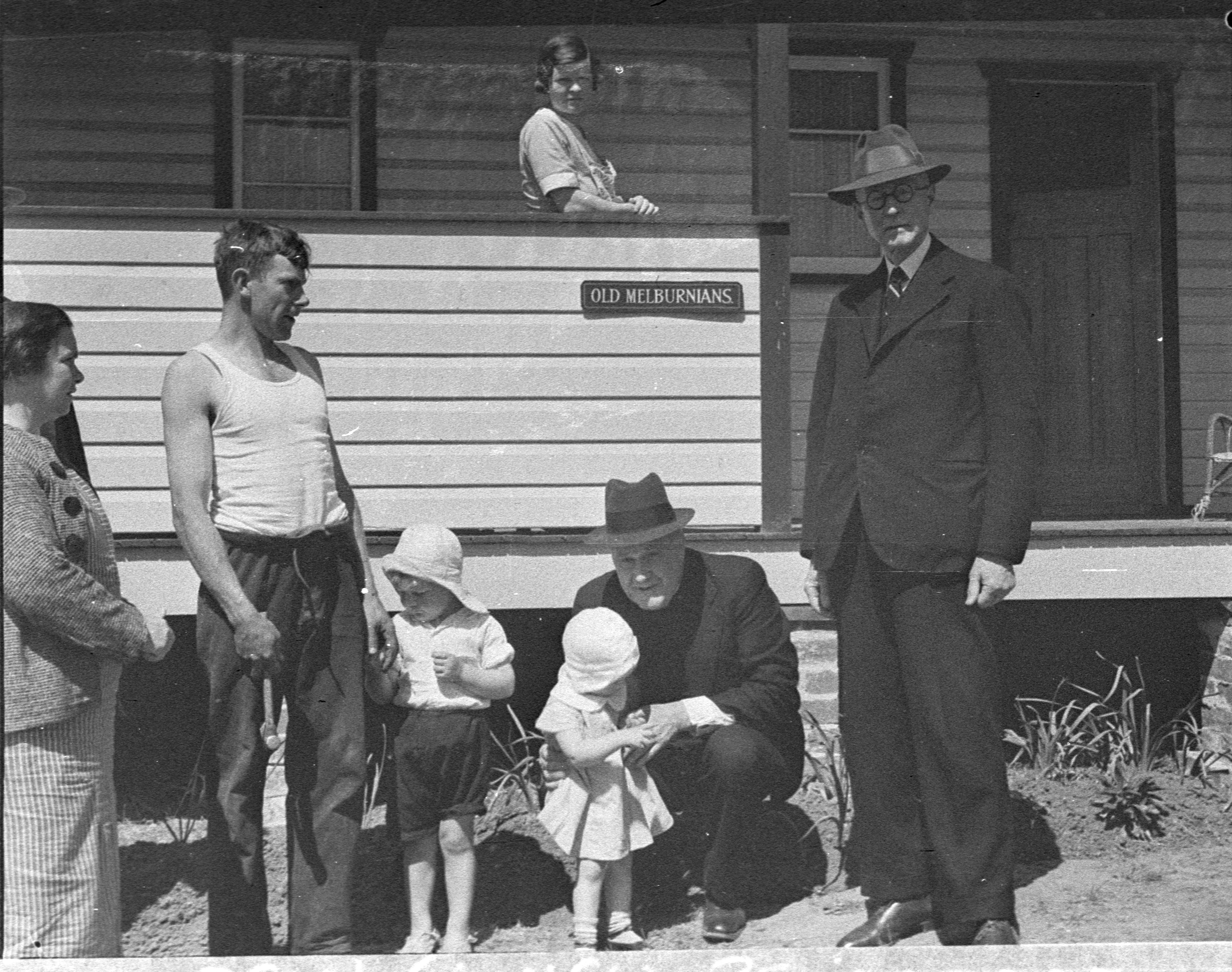
Hammond visiting a family at Hammondville, September 1936.

The majority of families still lacked employment after moving to Hammondville, and many relied on Hammond's charities to provide for other needs like furniture and clothing. The Pioneer Homes scheme eventually expanded to offer employment to the men living in Hammondville, such as constructing additional homes and performing other work for the community. In 1937–1938, one third of the budget of Hammond's Pioneer Homes was spent on wages for its residents. The lack of paid employment proved to be a significant challenge for the scheme and resulted in some residents being evicted for persistent failure to make payments on their homes. Other residents started small businesses, some using funding provided by Hammond. Hammond took an active role in the community, encouraging residents to abstain from alcohol and to participate in church activities.

In 1939, following the outbreak of the Second World War, nearly 100 residents from the community's population of 110 families enlisted to fight in the war. The war allowed many Hammondville families to pay off their homes, as they received a regular income for the first time since the onset of the Great Depression, and were credited by Hammond for the rent owed during the time they were serving in the military. By mid-1947, 53 families in Hammondville owned their own homes. In December 1959, ownership of the last of the original 110 cottages was transferred to its occupants.

== Later life ==
Hammond was appointed Canon of St Andrew's Cathedral in 1931 and Archdeacon of Redfern in 1939. He was made an Officer of the Order of the British Empire in 1937.

By 1943, Hammond was beginning to experience symptoms of Parkinson's disease. His wife Jean died on 3 June 1943. Hammond resigned from his role at St Barnabas' on 10 November 1943 and on 13 November married 39-year-old nurse Audrey Spence. He moved into a home in Beecroft upon his retirement, funded by £3000 in public donations (equivalent to $240,000 in 2022). He died on 12 May 1946 of cardiac failure at his home. On 14 May, his funeral was held at St Andrew's Cathedral, where Archbishop of Sydney Howard Mowll delivered his eulogy. He was cremated and his ashes buried at the cathedral.

== Legacy ==
Hammon is described in the Australian Dictionary of Biography as "one of the best-known Australian churchmen of his day", and has been described by historian Ian Breward as the "human face of the Diocese of Sydney" during the Great Depression. In 2008, Anglican Archbishop of Sydney Peter Jensen delivered an address to the Synod praising Hammond as someone who "modelled for us that typical evangelical alliance between preaching the word and care for the community". Jensen told the Synod:

He fed the hungry, clothed the poor, fought against the drug trade (namely the abuse of alcohol), advised the famous, lifted up the hopeless and began a whole new suburb of homes for the homeless, Hammondville...This while winning 4,400 men to Christ.

Hammond's relief efforts based out of St Barnabas', known as Hammond's Social Services, were continued after his death and later re-integrated with the Anglican Home Mission Society. Hammond's Pioneer Homes grew into the charity HammondCare, which continues to operate as an independent Christian charity providing aged care and community health services. The original Pioneer Homes settlement grew into the suburb of Hammondville, which still bears Hammond's name.
