= Eternity (graffito) =

Graffito found in Sydney, Australia in the mid-20th Century

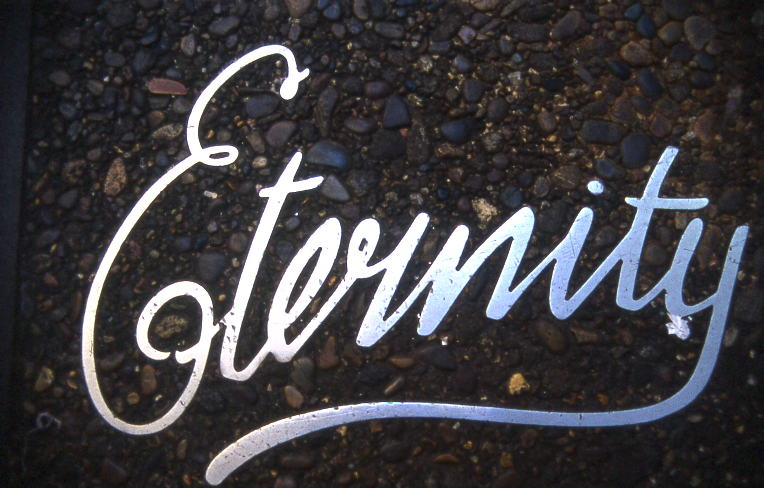
The aluminium replica Eternity at Town Hall Square, Sydney.

The word Eternity was a graffito tag that was written in chalk on the streets of Sydney, Australia about half a million times between 1932 and 1967. The identity of the perpetrator remained unknown for the first 24 years until he was identified as Arthur Stace, an illiterate pipe layer and evangelist Christian. Stace was a former petty criminal and alcoholic who started writing Eternity as his "one word sermon" after he converted.

== Arthur Stace ==
For about 35 years from his conversion until his death in 1967, Arthur Stace walked the streets of Sydney writing the single word "Eternity" on walls and footpaths in his unmistakable copperplate handwriting. Stace woke up at 4am and started chalking Eternity before dawn, typically targeting new suburbs or areas of Sydney each day. His identity remained unknown until it was finally revealed in a newspaper article in 1956. It is estimated Stace wrote the word over half a million times.

Stace struggled with someone who followed him around and altered new Eternity tags to say "maternity", and he started making a large, ornate capital E to prevent this. Stace said he was "very nearly arrested" many times for violating a City Council rule against defacing pavement, and that he "had permission from a higher source".

Only two original Eternity inscriptions are known to remain. One is on a piece of cardboard Stace gave to a fellow parishioner, and is held by the National Museum of Australia in Canberra. The other, and the only remaining inscription in situ, is inside the bell of the Sydney General Post Office clock tower.

=== Legacy and cultural impact ===
After Stace's death, the Eternity signature lived on. Australian contemporary artist, illustrator and filmmaker Martin Sharp noticed it and celebrated Stace's one-man campaign in many of his works. More recently, some Australian Christian groups, including those at universities, have run evangelistic campaigns whose promotion involved chalking "Eternity", after Stace's fashion, on footpaths.

During the Sydney New Year's Eve fireworks for the year 2000, an illuminated version of the "Eternity" tag was erected on the Sydney Harbour Bridge. Several months later during the 2000 Summer Olympics opening ceremony, a segment of the ceremony's artistic programme culminated with a recreation of the bridge and tag as seen during the fireworks, formed with sparklers.

In 2001 the Council of the City of Sydney was granted a trademark (817532) on the script in order to protect it from indiscriminate commercial use.

Sydney-based Australian non-denominational publication Eternity, founded in 2009, was named after the tag.

One of the works by English street artist Banksy during his October 2013 "residency" in New York City depicts a worker washing away the Eternity tag.

Sculptor Will Coles used the words on a concrete can.
