= Archie Roach discography =

- Studio albums: 10
- Live albums: 3
- Compilation albums: 5

The discography of Archie Roach AM, an Indigenous (Gunditjmara and Bundjalung) Australian musician consists of 10 studio albums, 3 live album, 1 soundtrack album and 5 compilation albums.

Roach has won numerous awards including and was inducted into the ARIA Hall of Fame in 2020.

== Albums ==
=== Studio albums ===
List of studio albums, with selected chart positions
Title	Details	Peak chart positions	Certifications
Title	Details	AUS	Certifications
Charcoal Lane	Released: May 1990; Label: Aurura, Mushroom (D30386); Formats: CD, cassette	86	ARIA: Gold
Jamu Dreaming	Released: March 1993; Label: Aurura, Mushroom (D30851); Formats: CD, cassette	55	
Looking for Butter Boy	Released: July 1997; Label: Aurura, Mushroom (320122); Formats: CD	52	
Sensual Being	Released: 22 July 2002; Label: Mushroom (335192); Formats: CD	59	
Journey	Released: 29 October 2007; Label: Liberation (LIBCD9259.2); Formats: CD	193	
Into the Bloodstream	Released: 19 October 2012; Label: Liberation (LMCD0197); Formats: CD	49	
Let Love Rule	Released: 11 November 2016; Label: Liberation (LMCD0297); Formats: CD, DD, streaming	24	
Dancing with My Spirit	Released: 13 April 2018; Label: Mushroom Music Publishing (335192); Formats: CD, DD, streaming, LP	—	
Tell Me Why	Released: 1 November 2019; Label: Bloodlines (BLOOD62); Formats: 2×CD, DD, streaming, LP	7	
The Songs of Charcoal Lane	Released: 13 November 2020; Label: Bloodlines (BLOOD83); Formats: CD, DD, streaming; Re-recorded Charcoal Lane	176	
"—" denotes a recording that did not chart or was not released in that territory.

=== Live albums ===
List of Live albums, with selected chart positions
Title	Details	Peak chart positions
Title	Details	AUS
Ruby (with Ruby Hunter, Paul Grabowsky and Australian Art Orchestra)	Released: 2005; Label: Australian Art Orchestra; Formats: CD	—
The Concert Collection 2012–2018	Released: 17 May 2019; Label: Bloodlines (BLOOD54); Formats: CD, DD, streaming	— (Note: The Concert Collection 2012-2018 did not enter the ARIA Top 100 Albums Chart, but peaked at number 42 on the ARIA Physical Sales chart.)
Live in Key Largo '92 and Darwin '93	Released: 1 August 2022; Label: Archie Roach, Australian Road Crew Association; Formats: DD, streaming	—

=== Soundtrack albums ===
List of soundtrack albums, with selected chart positions
Title	Details	Peak chart positions
Title	Details	AUS
The Tracker	Released: 12 August 2002; Label: Mushroom (334932); Formats: CD	171
"—" denotes a recording that did not chart or was not released in that territory.

=== Compilation albums ===
List of compilation albums
Title	Details	Peak chart positions
Title	Details	AUS
The Definitive Collection	Released: 5 July 2004; Label: Festival, Warner Music Australia (337682); Format: CD	—
Music Deli Presents Archie Roach 1988	Released: November 2009; Label: ABC Music (1791253); Format: CD; NB: Early recordings from 1988	—
Creation	Released: 4 October 2013; Label: Aurora, Festival (FEST601011); Format: 4×CD box set of Roach's first 4 studio albums	—
My Songs: 1989–2021	Released: 11 March 2022; Label: Bloodlines (BLOOD101); Format: 3×CD, streaming, download	68
Songs from the Kitchen Table (with Ruby Hunter)	Released: 31 May 2024; Format: digital download; Label: Archie Roach Foundation; Note: Compilation of unreleased tracks	—
"—" denotes a recording that did not chart or was not released in that territory.

=== Charting singles ===
List of singles to chart in top 200, with selected chart positions
Title	Year	Chart positions	Album
Title	Year	AUS AUS	Album
"Took the Children Away"	1990	160	Charcoal Lane
"From Paradise"	1993	107	Jamu Dreaming

=== Singles ===
List of singles as lead artist
Title	Year	Album
"Took the Children Away"	1990	Charcoal Lane
"Down City Streets"	1991	Charcoal Lane
"From Paradise"	1993	Jamu Dreaming
"Walking into Doors"	1993	Jamu Dreaming
"Hold On Tight"	1997	Looking for Butter Boy
"Watching Over Me"	1997	Looking for Butter Boy
"All Men Choose the Path They Walk"	2002	The Tracker
"Alien Invasion"	2002	Sensual Being
"A Child Was Born Tonight"	2005	Ruby
"Song to Sing"	2012	Into the Bloodstream
"We Won't Cry"	2012	Into the Bloodstream
"Colour of Your Jumper"	2013	
"Freedom" (Mau Power featuring Archie Roach)	2014	The Show Will Go On
"It's Not Too Late"	2016	Let Love Rule
"Get Back to the Land"	2016	Let Love Rule
"Open Your Eyes"	2019	Tell Me Why
"Rally Round the Drum" (with Paul Kelly)	2019	Tell Me Why
"One Song"	2022	My Songs: 1989 – 2021
"I'm Gonna Fly"(with Ellie Lovegrove)	2023	non album single

=== Other singles ===
List of other singles
Title	Year
"Our Home, Our Land" (with various artists)	1995
"Yil Lull" (as Singers for the Red Black & Gold)	1998
"You're the Voice" (as United Voices Against Domestic Violence)	2017
"Song for Elijah (Wrap Our Arms Around You)" (with various artists)	2017
