= My Songs: 1989–2021 =

Greatest hits album by Archie Roach
- Released: 11 March 2022
- Recorded: 1989–2021
- Length: 207:52
- Label: Bloodlines

Archie Roach chronology
The Songs of Charcoal Lane (2020)	My Songs: 1989–2021 (2022)

Singles from My Songs: 1989–2021
- 1. "One Song" Released: 11 February 2022

My Songs: 1989–2021 is a career-spanning anthology by Australian singer songwriter Archie Roach, released on 11 March 2022. The album will be supported with Roach's "last road tour of NSW". The album was nominated for Album of the Year at the National Indigenous Music Awards 2022. The album debuted on the ARIA chart at number 68 in the week following his death on 30 July 2022.

== Track listing ==
CD1
No.	Title	Writer(s)	Album	Length
1.	"Hung Over" (demo)	Archie Roach	Unreleased from the Charcoal Lane Sessions	2:39
2.	"Open Up Your Eyes"	Roach	Tell Me Why	2:58
3.	"Bicentennial Blues"	Roach	1988	5:01
4.	"No Celebrations"		new recording	5:41
5.	"Took the Children Away"	Roach	Charcoal Lane	5:25
6.	"Charcoal Lane"	Roach	Charcoal Lane	3:21
7.	"Summer of My Life"	Roach	Charcoal Lane	3:37
8.	"Tell Me Why"		Tell Me Why	3:25
9.	"Weeping in the Forest"	Roach	Jamu Dreaming	4:25
10.	"A Child Was Born Here" (featuring Tiddas)			4:53
11.	"From Paradise"	Roach	Jamu Dreaming	4:21
12.	"Walking Into Doors"	Roach	Jamu Dreaming	4:51
13.	"Beggar Man"	Roach	Looking for Butter Boy	3:51
14.	"River Song"	Roach	Looking for Butter Boy	4:53
15.	"Dancing Shoes" (featuring Tiddas)		Dancing with My Spirit	3:30
16.	"Colour of Your Jumper" (demo)			4:09
Total length:				67:00

CD2
No.	Title	Writer(s)	Album	Length
1.	"Move It On"	Archie Roach	Sensual Being	4:51
2.	"Small Child"	Roach	Tell Me Why	5:37
3.	"Morning Star" (featuring Tiddas)	Roach	Dancing with My Spirit	7:02
4.	"Mission Ration Blues"	Roach	Sensual Being	4:07
5.	"Alien Invasion"	Roach	Sensual Being	4:53
6.	"This Woman" (demo)			5:20
7.	"I Don't Wanna Go" (demo)			5:47
8.	"Mulyawongk" (demo)			5:45
9.	"Take Your Time" (demo)			4:51
10.	"Travellin' Bones" (demo)			3:31
11.	"Lighthouse (Song for Two Mothers)"	Roach	Tell Me Why	6:29
12.	"Spirit of Place"	Roach	Journey	4:55
13.	"Old People Singing"	Roach	Journey	5:58
14.	"Your Old Ones"	Roach	Journey	5:29
Total length:				74:35

CD3
No.	Title	Writer(s)	Album	Length
1.	"Into the Bloodstream"	Roach	Into the Bloodstream	4:52
2.	"We Won't Cry" (featuring Paul Kelly)		Into the Bloodstream	3:39
3.	"Old Mission Road"	Roach	Into the Bloodstream	4:32
4.	"Song to Sing"	Roach	Into the Bloodstream	5:47
5.	"Let Love Rule" (featuring The Dhungala Children's Choir)	Roach	The Concert Collection 2012–2018	4:39
6.	"Get Back to the Land"	Roach	Let Love Rule	3:46
7.	"Love Sweet Love" (featuring Emma Donovan)		The Concert Collection 2012–2018	4:53
8.	"Mighty Clarence River"	Roach, Craig Pilkington	Let Love Rule	3:44
9.	"One for Each Person, and One for the Pot"		Tell Me Why	3:12
10.	"Always Be Here" (featuring Sally Dastey)		Tell Me Why	3:31
11.	"Rally Round the Drum" (featuring Paul Kelly)	Roach, Paul Kelly	Tell Me Why	5:33
12.	"Nopun Kurongk"	Roach, Ruby Hunter	Tell Me Why	7:47
13.	"Place of Fire"		Tell Me Why	4:20
14.	"One Song"		new recording	6:02
Total length:				66:17

== Charts ==
Chart performance for My Songs: 1989–2021
Chart (2022)	Peak position
Australian Albums (ARIA)	68
