= Creation (Archie Roach album) =

Box set by Archie Roach
- Released: 3 October 2013
- Recorded: 1990–2002
- Label: Festival Records
- Producer: Paul Kelly, David Bridie, Malcolm Burn, Richard Pleasance

Archie Roach chronology
Into the Bloodstream (2012)	Creation (2013)	Let Love Rule (2016)

Creation is a box set by Australian singer songwriter Archie Roach. The box set features remastered versions of Roach's first four studio albums with Mushroom Records between 1990 and 2002 with 14 previously unreleased bonus tracks and deluxe packaging including detailed liner notes, commentary from the albums' producers Paul Kelly, David Bridie, Malcolm Burn and Richard Pleasance. The album was released to coincide with the premiere of Roach's new live show, also entitled Creation which ran for three dates in October 2013 at the inaugural Boomerang Festival in Byron Bay. Additional dates for Creation were added for 20 and 21 June 2014 in Adelaide.

Roach told the Cairns Post performing the songs of Creation helps him remember the impact his music has had. “I think you realise (the songs) have actually grown through the years. I haven’t performed them for a little while, so they are quite fresh and new for me again. I think I interpret them in a different way now, they’ve had a chance to mature a bit.”

== Track listing ==
Charcoal Lane
No.	Title	Writer(s)	Length
1.	"Native Born"	Archie Roach	4:00
2.	"Charcoal Lane"	Roach	3:21
3.	"Munjana"	Roach	7:36
4.	"I've Lied"	Roach	3:17
5.	"Down City Streets"	Ruby Hunter	4:04
6.	"Took the Children Away"	Roach	5:24
7.	"Sister Brother"	Roach	4:27
8.	"Beautiful Child"	Roach	4:01
9.	"No No No"	Roach	3:49
10.	"Summer of My Life"	Roach	3:34
11.	"Koorie Koorie" (Demo)		7:11
12.	"Took the Children Away" (Demo)	Roach	6:45
13.	"Hung Over" (Demo)		2:37

Jamu Dreaming
No.	Title	Writer(s)	Length
1.	"Weeping in the Forest"	Archie Roach	4:52
2.	"From Paradise"	Roach	4:20
3.	"Mr. T"	Roach	4:34
4.	"Love in the Morning"	Roach	4:21
5.	"Tell Me Why"	Roach	3:25
6.	"Walking into Doors"	Roach	4:49
7.	"Wild Blue Gums"	Roach	4:42
8.	"So Young"	Dave Arden	3:11
9.	"Angela"	Roach	4:05
10.	"Jamu Dreaming"	Roach, Bridie, John Phillips	4:19
11.	"There Is a Garden"	Roach	5:18
12.	"Weeping in the Forest" (Live)	Roach	5:12
13.	"Tell Me Why" (Live)	Roach	4:45
14.	"Walking into Doors" (Live)	Roach	4:52
15.	"There Is a Garden"	Roach	1:23

Looking for Butter Boy
No.	Title	Writer(s)	Length
1.	"Beggar Man"	Archie Roach	3:50
2.	"A Child Was Born Here"	Roach	4:21
3.	"My Grandmother"	Roach	4:18
4.	"Dancing (With My Spirit)"	Roach	4:16
5.	"F Troop"	Roach	4:43
6.	"Mother's Heartbeat"	Roach	4:55
7.	"Djabugai Lady"	Roach	5:07
8.	"Hold On Tight"	Roach, Mark Seymour	4:27
9.	"River Song"	Roach	4:53
10.	"Reach for You"	Roach	3:37
11.	"Give Unto Caesar"	Roach	4:13
12.	"Louis St John"	Roach	5:32
13.	"Watching over Me"	Roach	4:03
14.	"Beggar Man" (Demo)	Roach	4:02
15.	"Dancing Shoes" (Demo)		3:30
16.	"Nowhere to Go" (Demo)	Roach	5:24
17.	"Colour of Your Jumper" (Demo)	Roach	4:09

Sensual Being
No.	Title	Writer(s)	Length
1.	"Alien Invasion"	Archie Roach	4:52
2.	"Life Is Worth Living"	Roach	4:39
3.	"Just a Little Time"	Roach	4:34
4.	"I Will I See You Tonight"	Roach	4:53
5.	"Mission Ration Blues"	Roach	4:08
6.	"Outside Your Window"	Roach	4:47
7.	"Many Waters Rise"	Roach	4:47
8.	"Cold Wind Blows"	Roach	4:11
9.	"Free to Be a Man"	Roach	3:50
10.	"Morning Star"	Roach	4:58
11.	"Move It On"	Roach	4:52
12.	"Small Child"	Roach	5:35
13.	"This Woman" (Demo)		5:20
14.	"Take Your Time" (Demo)		4:52
15.	"Mulyawongk" (Demo)		5:47
16.	"I Dont Wanna Go" (Demo)		5:51

== Release history ==
Country	Date	Format	Label	Catalogue
Australia	3 October 2013	4xCD; digital download	Festival Records	FEST601011
