= Message Sticks Festival =

Arts festival celebrating Aboriginal Australian culture, held in Sydney

Message Sticks Festival/Homeground
- Begins: 1999 or 2000
- Frequency: Annual
- Locations: Sydney Opera House, Sydney, New South Wales, Australia
- Most recent: 25–26 November 2017

Message Sticks Festival, also known for some time as Message Sticks Indigenous Film Festival, was an arts festival celebrating the culture of Aboriginal Australians, based at the Sydney Opera House, between 1999 and 2013. It focused on film for several years, but music, theatre and dance were also showcased. The festival was succeeded by Homeground in 2014.

== Message Sticks ==
Message Sticks was initially held at the Sydney Opera House and afterwards toured nationally, between 1999 or 2000 and 2013.

In its earliest incarnations, it incorporated Indigenous dance, music, theatre and film, but from 2002 it focused on film, curated by Rachel Perkins and Darren Dale of Blackfella Films. As event producer of the film festival, the venue aimed to showcase both established and emerging Indigenous filmmakers. From 2004 the Australian Film Commission (from 2008 Screen Australia) started funding the film festival.

In June 2004, the musical production Ruby's Story, telling the story of singer-songwriter Ruby Hunter, and staged by Hunter, her musical and life partner Archie Roach, along with Paul Grabowsky and the Australian Art Orchestra, debuted at Message Sticks. The production was reviewed well, the soundtrack went on to win the Deadly Award for Excellence in Film & Theatrical Score, and the show toured internationally and regionally until 2009.

Create NSW's strategic plan for 2011–2014 included two-year support for Sydney Opera House's first Head of Indigenous Programming, Rhoda Roberts, and further development of the festival into "a multi-arts program of contemporary and traditional Indigenous expression through theatre, dance, song, film, visual art and talks". Attendance rose 40% in 2013, from 10,000 people in 2012, of whom 92% were new attendees. The festival was six days long in its later editions. In 2011 its touring destinations included Brisbane, Perth, Alice Springs, Broome, Cairns, Darwin and Yirrkala.

== Homeground ==
In 2014 the Opera House replaced Message Sticks with Homeground, a two-day festival focusing on Indigenous music and dance. Part of the reason for the change, according to Roberts, was the difficulty of obtaining new-release films, as Indigenous films had achieved such a high degree of success in mainstream cinemas, TV and festivals.

Being an international event, the programme includes First Nations performers and traditions from countries such as New Zealand, Canada, Ireland, and Tibet. It features music and dance workshops, along with displays of contemporary art and traditional art forms.

As of January 2022, the last festival on the website took place from 25 to 26 November 2017. Yothu Yindi & The Treaty Project played at the festival
