= Dancing with My Spirit =

Studio album by Archie Roach
- Released: 13 April 2018
- Length: 59:38
- Label: Mushroom Music Publishing
- Producer: Jen Anderson

Archie Roach chronology
Let Love Rule (2016)	Dancing with My Spirit (2018)	The Concert Collection 2012-2018 (2019)

Dancing with My Spirit is the eighth studio album by Australian singer songwriter Archie Roach. The album was recorded in the 1990s and for a variety of reasons, remained ‘unreleased’ until 2018, where it was released in April 2018 and was supported by a national tour.

== Background and Release ==
Roach released his debut studio album Charcoal Lane in 1990 and Jamu Dreaming in 1993. Roach recorded tracks with Tiddas at this time with musicians Bruce Haymes (keyboards), Dave Steel (guitars), Stuart Speed (bass) and Archie Cuthbertson (drums). Circumstances at the time saw it shelved and virtually forgotten as Tiddas released their debut studio album Sing About Life in 1993, which achieving gold record sales and won an ARIA award at the ARIA Music Awards of 1994.

In 1997, Roach released his critically acclaimed third studio album Looking for Butter Boy. In November 2017, to celebrating the 20th anniversary of that album, Roach announced the release with a new album, full of demos from those early sessions.

In March 2018, Tiddas announced they were reuniting for a one-off national tour to celebrate the release of Roach's “lost” album, Dancing with My Spirit.

== Track listing ==
No.	Title	Writer(s)	Length
1.	"A Child Was Born Here"	Archie Roach	4:52
2.	"Dancing With My Spirit"	Roach	4:57
3.	"Heal the People, Heal the Land"		4:40
4.	"Morning Star"	Roach	7:00
5.	"Hold On Tight"	Roach, Mark Seymour	5:08
6.	"F-Troop"	Roach	4:51
7.	"Dancing Shoes"	Roach	3:28
8.	"Nowhere to Go"	Roach	5:18
9.	"Give Unto Caesar"	Roach	4:33
10.	"Colour of Your Jumper"	Roach	4:09
11.	"My Grandmother"	Roach	4:39
12.	"The River Song"	Roach	6:03
Total length:			59:38

== Tour ==
In 2018, Tiddas announced that they are reforming especially to sing with Roach once more, and to showcase the songs from the album via series of performances around Australia. Jen Anderson, the album's producer, said "Needless to say I'm absolutely thrilled at this turn of events – thrilled that a recording I truly believe in is finally being released, thrilled that the Tiddas are finally returning to the stage, and totally thrilled to be involved as producer of the album and one of the performing musicians in these upcoming shows. Some things are truly worth waiting for.."

Raphael Solarsh from Arts Hub gave the performance 5 out of 5 saying "Dancing with My Spirit told an Australian story that has rarely been more needed and did it in a manner that renews one's faith in harmony and progress at a time when division and trench warfare have become the norms of public discourse." adding "Tiddas in particularly possess a stage presence that borders on the magical... Archie Roach still has the charm to spin a marvellous yarn and a heart that has possibly never left his sleeve." ending with "What more can really be said about this incredible performance and these timeless songs other than pull up a chair and enjoy."

Date	Location	Venue
6 May 2018	Melbourne	Hamer Hall, Arts Centre
9 May 2018	Sydney	Enmore Theatre
11 May 2018	Brisbane	The Tivoli
27 May 2018	Canberra	Canberra Theatre Centre
8 June 2018	Perth	State Theatre Centre of WA
15 June 2018	Hobart	Odeon Theatre
22 June 2018	Adelaide	Dunstan Playhouse
23 June 2018	Adelaide	Dunstan Playhouse

== Release history ==
Country	Date	Format	Label	Catalogue
Australia	13 April 2018	Compact Disc; Vinyl; digital download	Mushroom Music Publishing	335192
