= Tell Me Why (Archie Roach album) =

- Digital and vinyl cover

Studio album by Archie Roach
- Released: 1 November 2019
- Length: 90:30
- Label: Bloodlines
- Producer: Paul Grabowsky

Archie Roach chronology
The Concert Collection 2012–2018 (2019)	Tell Me Why (2019)	The Songs of Charcoal Lane (2020)

Singles from Tell Me Why
- 1. "Open Your Eyes" Released: 27 September 2019; 2. "Rally Round the Drum" Released: 1 November 2019

Tell Me Why is a companion album to Australian singer songwriter Archie Roach's memoir of the same name. It was released on 1 November 2019. The album re-imagines 11 songs that have defined Roach's career, together with two songs that were written and never recorded, two songs of early influence, and three brand new recordings.

It was nominated for Album of the Year at the 2020 National Indigenous Music Awards. At the ARIA Music Awards of 2020, the album was nominated for three categories and Roach won both Best Male Artist and Best Adult Contemporary Album. He was also inducted into the ARIA Hall of Fame.

== Singles ==
The album's lead single "Open Your Eyes" was released on 27 September 2019. The song is the first song Roach ever penned but remained unrecorded. Roach wrote "Open Your Eyes" in the late 1970s during a stint in rehab at Galiamble, a Men's Alcohol and Drug Recovery Centre in St Kilda. Roach said "I was about 19 or 20 years old. During whatever free time I had outside of our chores and the AA meetings, I would have with me a guitar, a pen and a notebook. One time, as I started writing what I thought was a poem, having always loved poetry, I looked down at the words: 'At fifteen I left my home, looking for the people I call my own, but all I found was pain and strife'. I realised then that writing and words, poetry and prose, has a rhythm to it. I picked up the guitar and started strumming and – bang – it just came, the melody and the rhythm and everything, all at once."

On 1 November 2019, "Rally Round the Drum" was released. The song was co-written with Paul Kelly when they toured New Zealand together in the early 1990s. Now, these two giants of Australian music reunite to finally record the song together.

== Track listing ==
Digital version
No.	Title	Writer(s)	Length
1.	"Took the Children Away"	Archie Roach	5:59
2.	"A Child Was Born Here"	Roach	5:35
3.	"F Toop"	Roach	4:41
4.	"Nopun Kurongk"	Roach, Ruby Hunter	7:48
5.	"Just a Closer Walk with Thee" (with Emma Donovan)	Unknown	5:54
6.	"Lighthouse (Song for Two Mothers)"	Roach	6:18
7.	"One for Each Person, and One for the Pot"		3:14
8.	"Little by Little"		5:50
9.	"Down City Streets"	Hunter	5:49
10.	"Rally Round the Drum" (featuring Paul Kelly)	Roach, Kelly	5:33
11.	"Small Child"	Roach	5:45
12.	"The Jetty Song"		3:50
13.	"Always Be Here" (featuring Sally Dastey)		5:10
14.	"Tell Me Why" (featuring Sally Dastey)		3:14
15.	"Let Love Rule"	Roach	4:35
16.	"Open Up Your Eyes"	Roach	3:00
17.	"I'm So Lonesome I Could Cry"	Hank Williams	3:55
18.	"Place of Fire"		4:20

== Charts ==
Chart (2019)	Peak position
Australian Albums (ARIA)	7

== Release history ==
Country	Date	Format	Label	Catalogue
Australia	1 November 2019	2×CD+limited book; digital download; streaming	Bloodline	BLOOD62
Australia	1 November 2019	Vinyl	Bloodline	BLOODLP62
