= My Song =

My Song may refer to:

- My Song (Keith Jarrett album), 1978
- My Song (Joe Pass album), 1993
- My Songs, a 2019 album by Sting
- My Songs: 1989–2021, 2022 compilation album by Archie Roach
- "My Song" (Johnny Ace song), 1952
- "My Song" (Jerry Cantrell song), 1998
- "My Song", by Glass Tiger from the 1988 album Diamond Sun
- "My Song", by Labi Siffre from the 1972 album Crying Laughing Loving Lying
- "My Song", by The Moody Blues from the 1971 recording of Every Good Boy Deserves Favour
