= Let Love Rule (Archie Roach album) =

Album by Archie Roach

Studio album by Archie Roach
- Released: 11 November 2016
- Length: 45:27
- Label: Liberation
- Producer: Craig Pilkington

Archie Roach chronology
| Creation (2013) | Let Love Rule (2016) | Dancing with My Spirit (2018) |

Singles from Let Love Rule
- 1. "It's Not Too Late" Released: August 2016; 2. "Get Back to the Land" Released: November 2016

Let Love Rule is the seventh studio album by Australian singer songwriter Archie Roach. The album was released in November 2016 and peaked at number 24 on the ARIA Charts and became Roach's highest charting album to date. Upon release Roach said "I wanted to write about love, or a willingness to love all people. We are closing ourselves off and not letting people in. And not just in the sense of not letting them into the country, but not letting them into our hearts, into our minds. Many of the songs on the album are really a call for understanding."

At the ARIA Music Awards of 2017, the album was nominated for Best Blues and Roots Album.

== Background ==
The 18-month creative process of Let Love Rule saw Roach travelling from a modest inner-Melbourne recording studio to the Melbourne Recital Centre and back to his mother's Gunditijmara country. Roach reuniting with producer Craig Pilkington who worked on Into the Bloodstream in 2012, the spiritual work encapsulates a soulful production style and a vocal performance that is unparalleled.

== Reception ==
Jack Latimore from Beat Magazine gave the album 8.5 out of 10 saying "Archie Roach's new album Let Love Rule is a complex, textured offering that reaches orchestral heights, often from minimal, pensive beginnings." adding "Lyrically, Let Love Rule is imbued with human compassion, mutual respect, and spiritual exhortations." Latimore said "The minimalistic, melancholic yet hopeful "Always Be Here".. is a standout track, along with the elated west-mex "Love Is Everything"."

Paul Barr from Reading said "Musically, Let Love Rule is Roach's most varied and adventurous affair yet." adding "Album opener and title track "Let Love Rule" begins with piano, a strong gospel feel, and pretty much outlines the lyrical themes of the album: the power of love over hate and darkness, and Roach's love for all people."

Jason Whyte from Arts Review said "Let Love Rule is not about to push contemporary music in any new direction or pose any awkward questions to the listener. Still, Roach shows himself to be a resilient performer and personality, following a series of personal hardships."

== Track listing ==
Let Love Rule track listing
| No. | Title | Writer(s) | Length |
|---|---|---|---|
| 1. | "Let Love Rule" | Archie Roach | 4:36 |
| 2. | "Always Be Here" | Roach, Craig Pilkington | 4:40 |
| 3. | "Mighty Clarence River" | Roach, Pilkington | 3:46 |
| 4. | "Love Is Everything" | Roach | 4:7 |
| 5. | "It's Not Too Late" | Roach, Pilkington | 3:42 |
| 6. | "There's a Little Child" | Roach | 4:09 |
| 7. | "Get Back To the Land" | Roach | 3:44 |
| 8. | "Spiritual Love" | Roach | 3:31 |
| 9. | "Please Don't Give Up On Me" | Roach, Pilkington | 3:24 |
| 10. | "Love Sweet Love" | Roach | 4:52 |
| 11. | "No More Bleeding" | Roach | 3:28 |
| Total length: | | | 45:27 |

== Charts ==
Chart performance for Let Love Rule
| Chart (2016) | Peak position |
|---|---|
| Australian Albums (ARIA) | 24 |

== Release history ==
Release history and formats for Let Love Rule
| Country | Date | Format | Label | Catalogue |
|---|---|---|---|---|
| Australia | 11 November 2016 | Compact disc; digital download; streaming | Liberation | LMCD0297 |
