= Stik n Move =

Australian hip hop group

- Origin: Queanbeyan, New South Wales, Australia
- Genre: Hip-hop
- Members: TooDeadly; Wizz

Stik n Move are an Australian hip-hop duo. The group is made up of brothers in law Nathan "TooDeadly" Carter and Michael "Wizz" Weir. They are joined by Koolism's DJ Danielsan for their live shows.

The group was named Most Promising New Talent in Music at the Deadly Awards 2013.

== Members ==
- Nathan "TooDeadly" Carter
- Michael "Wizz" Weir
