= Sensual Being =

Studio album by Archie Roach
- Released: July 2002
- Studio: Padded Cell, Melbourne, Australia
- Length: 56:06
- Label: Mushroom Records
- Producer: Richard Pleasance, Paul Kelly

Archie Roach chronology
Looking for Butter Boy (1997)	Sensual Being (2002)	The Tracker (2002)

Singles from Sensual Being
- 1. "Alien Invasion" Released: 2002

Sensual Being is the fourth studio album by Australian singer songwriter Archie Roach. The album was released in July 2002 and peaked at number 59 on the ARIA Charts.

At the ARIA Music Awards of 2002, the album was nominated for Best Adult Contemporary Album.

== Background ==
Roach released his debut studio album Charcoal Lane in 1990, which was produced by Paul Kelly. Sensual Being sees Kelly producing again alongside Richard Pleasance from Boom Crash Opera. Roach said “Richard's was one of the names suggested to me as a producer when I was working on Jamu Dreaming and now we've finally got to work together. Paul knew Richard and gave him a pretty good rap.” Pleasance replaced Roach on most of the guitar tracks, allowing Roach to focus on vocals. Roach said “Paul and Richard created this wall of sound so I could just concentrate on the vocals. Even though Richard tried to duplicate my guitar playing, he still had a bit of a different rhythm, so it was good to sing over something different.”

== Reception ==
Deadly magazine said the album is "something of a stylistic departure" but saying "it's also his best work to date". The magazine review said "The vocals on Sensual Being are stunning and reminiscent of the great Aaron Neville. It's easy to understand why Paul [Kelly] was moved to tears when Archie sang "Many Waters Rise".

== Track listing ==
No.	Title	Writer(s)	Length
1.	"Alien Invasion"	Archie Roach	4:52
2.	"Life Is Worth Living"	Roach	4:39
3.	"Just a Little Time"	Roach	4:34
4.	"I Will I See You Tonight"	Roach	4:53
5.	"Mission Ration Blues"	Roach	4:08
6.	"Outside Your Window"	Roach	4:47
7.	"Many Waters Rise"	Roach	4:47
8.	"Cold Wind Blows"	Roach	4:11
9.	"Free to Be a Man"	Roach	3:50
10.	"Morning Star"	Roach	4:58
11.	"Move It On"	Roach	4:52
12.	"Small Child"	Roach	5:35

== Charts ==
Chart (2002)	Peak position
Australian Albums (ARIA)	52

== Release history ==
Country	Date	Format	Label	Catalogue
Australia	22 July 2002	Compact Disc; digital download	Mushroom Records	335192
