= Deadly Awards 2003 =

Australian Aboriginal and Torres Strait Islander annual music awards

Deadly Awards were an annual celebration of Australian Aboriginal and Torres Strait Islander achievement in music, sport, entertainment and community.

== Music ==
- Male Artist of the Year: Troy Cassar-Daley
- Female Artist of the Year: Christine Anu
- Most Promising New Talent in Music: South West Syndicate
- Band of the Year: NoKTuRNL
- Country Artist of the Year: Todd Williams
- Single of the Year: Down River - The Wilcannia Mob
- Album of the Year: Shakaya - Shakaya
- Outstanding Contribution to Aboriginal and Torres Strait Islander Music: Archie Roach and Ruby Hunter

== Sport ==
- Male Sportsperson of the Year: Anthony Mundine
- Female Sportsperson of the Year: Cathy Freeman
- Most Promising New Talent in Sport: Daniel Motlop
- Outstanding Achievement in Football: Rhys Wesser
- Outstanding Contribution to Aboriginal and Torres Strait Islander Sport: Kyle Vander-Kuyp

== The arts ==
- Male Actor of the Year: Aaron Pedersen
- Female Actor of the Year: Deborah Mailman
- Male Dancer of the Year: Albert David
- Female Dancer of the Year: Frances Rings

== Community ==
- Outstanding Achievement in Aboriginal and Torres Strait Islander Education: Tranby Aboriginal College
- Outstanding Achievement in Aboriginal and Torres Strait Islander Health: Redfern AMS
- Aboriginal and Torres Strait Islander Broadcaster of the Year: Lola Forrester – SBS
