= Ruby (Archie Roach, Ruby Hunter, Paul Grabowsky and Australian Art Orchestra album) =

2005 album

Soundtrack album by Archie Roach, Ruby Hunter, Paul Grabowsky and Australian Art Orchestra
- Released: 2005
- Recorded: 2004
- Venue: Allen Eaton Studios
- Length: 63:14
- Label: Australian Art Orchestra
- Producer: Paul Grabowsky

Archie Roach albums chronology
| The Definitive Collection (2004) | Ruby (2005) | Journey (2007) |

Singles from Ruby
- 1. "A Child Was Born Tonight" Released: 2005

Ruby is a soundtrack album recorded live by Australian singers Archie Roach and Ruby Hunter with Paul Grabowsky and Australian Art Orchestra. The album, based on a musical production called Ruby's Story staged in 2004, was released in 2005.

== Stage production ==
In 2004, Roach and Hunter collaborated with Grabowsky, founder of the Australian Art Orchestra, to produce Ruby's Story, a semi-autobiographical musical stage production based on Hunter's life. It told her story, from her birth near a billabong on banks of the Murray River, through her experience as one of the stolen generation, her search for identity and the discovery of hope through love. The show debuted at the 2004 Message Sticks Festival held at the Sydney Opera House.

The production toured regionally and internationally until 2009, with destinations including the Dunstan Playhouse at the Adelaide Festival Centre, as part of the Adelaide Cabaret Festival (2004); the Famous Spiegeltent at the Melbourne International Arts Festival; Brisbane Powerhouse; several towns in the Northern Territory of Australia; and Festival de Mexico Centro Historico, Mexico (2005); a further seven shows at the Sydney Opera House in 2006; Auckland Festival, New Zealand; Kuala Lumpur, Malaysia; and others.

== Reception ==
The Sydney Morning Herald's reviewer wrote in June 2004: "This was the finest, most moving work the Australian Art Orchestra has undertaken", adding "It is primarily a celebration of Ruby Hunter's resilience and ability to find joy in life, but it also makes the anguish of the stolen generation real and raw... Attending Ruby's Story should probably be mandatory for those lost souls who spurn an official apology as a step towards reconciliation. It is not, however, about wallowing in grief. It is an uplifting affirmation of the human spirit".

In July 2004, Hunter said "The feedback we've received has been really positive, people have been truly moved, feeling that it was their story being told too. The emotion in the room was tangible".

== Awards ==
In 2004, the soundtrack won the Deadly Award for Excellence in Film & Theatrical Score. Following the award, Roach said "Ruby's Story was a collaboration with Aboriginal people and non-Aboriginal people that created something beautiful and good. An award like this is confirmation that Aboriginal people can work with all sorts of people from all fields and produce excellent work".

== Album release ==
The soundtrack of the musical was released on CD and as a digital download in 2005.

== Track listing ==
| No. | Title | Writer(s) | Length |
|---|---|---|---|
| 1. | "A Child Was Born Tonight" | Archie Roach, Ruby Hunter | 6:37 |
| 2. | "Ngarrindjeri Woman" | Roach, Hunter | 3:00 |
| 3. | "Nopun Kurongk" | Roach, Hunter | 7:23 |
| 4. | "Held Up To The Moon (In My Grandfather's Hands)" | Roach, Hunter | 3:59 |
| 5. | "Wash My Soul in the River's Flow" | Roach, Hunter | 6:10 |
| 6. | "Daisy Chains, String Games and Knuckle Bones" | Roach, Hunter | 5:54 |
| 7. | "Took the Children Away" | Roach, Hunter | 7:03 |
| 8. | "Coolamen Baby" | Roach, Hunter | 6:20 |
| 9. | "Little By Little" | Roach, Hunter | 6:37 |
| 10. | "Down City Streets" | Hunter | 7:30 |
| 11. | "Old So & So" | Roach, Hunter | 7:44 |
| 12. | "Kura Tungar" | Roach, Hunter | 5:23 |
