= David Arden =

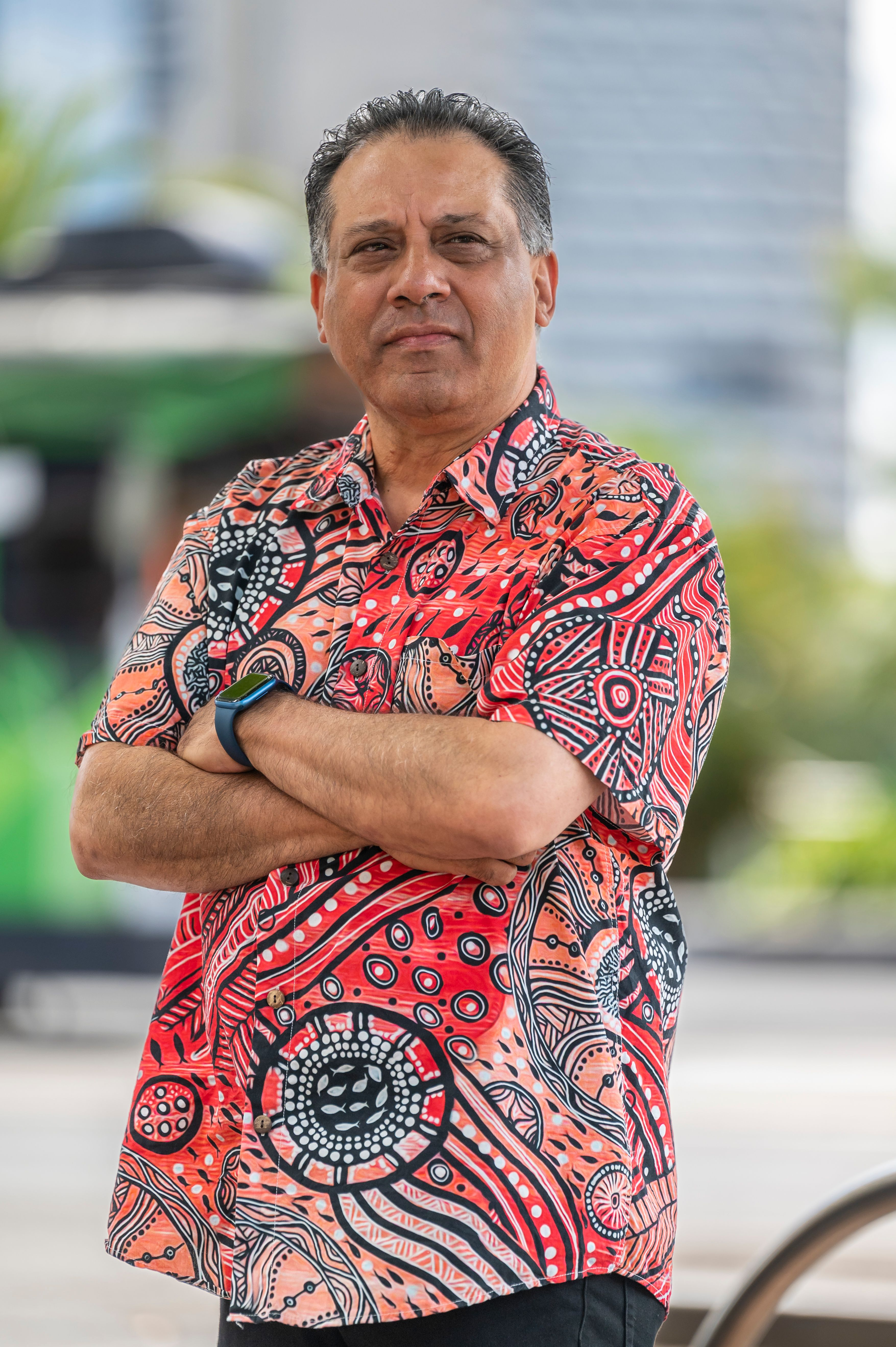

Background information
- Occupations: Singer, guitarist
- Instruments: Vocals, guitar

David Arden is an Australian singer-songwriter and Aboriginal activist.

== Career ==
Arden is a Kokatha and a Gunditjmara songman.

He has performed with Archie Roach, Ruby Hunter, Tiddas, Bart Willoughby, and Mixed Relations, and with members of Shane Howard, Paul Kelly, Not Drowning Waving, and Hunters and Collectors.

He was a founding member and co-musical director of The Black Arm Band.

== Awards and nominations ==
=== Music Victoria Awards ===
The Music Victoria Awards are an annual awards night celebrating Victorian music. They commenced in 2006.

Year	Nominee / work	Award	Result	Ref.
Music Victoria Awards of 2016	Dave Arden	Best Indigenous Act	Nominated	

== Discography ==
=== Albums ===
List of albums, with selected details
Title	Details
John Pat	Released: 1987; Format: Tape.; Label: Rock Against Racism & Koori Youth Band
Rainbow Man	Released: 1996; Format: Tape.; Label: David Arden & Altogether
Kookatha / Gunditjmara Clan	Released: 2008; Format: CD, Digital; Label: Goanna Arts (GADA0108)
Close My Eyes	Released: July 2016; Format: CD, Digital; Label: David Arden
Red Dessert Man	Released: March 2020; Format: CD, Digital; Label: Headstone Records
MEERTA - The Ballad of James Arden	Released: July 2023; Format: CD & Vinl, Digital; Label: David Arden
