= Deadly Awards 2013 =

The 2013 Deadly Awards were hosted by Luke Carroll and Karla Grant at the Sydney Opera House on 10 September 2013. The Awards program was broadcast nationally on SBS One on 14 September 2013. The awards event was an annual celebration of Australian Aboriginal and Torres Strait Islander achievement in music, sport, entertainment and community.

== Lifetime achievement ==
- Ella Award for Lifetime Achievement in Aboriginal and Torres Strait Islander Sport: Adam Goodes (AFL)
- Jimmy Little Award for Lifetime Achievement in Music and the Performing Arts: Steve Mullawalla Dodd
- The Marcia Langton Award For Lifetime Achievement In Leadership: Pat O'Shane
- The Lifetime Contribution Award For Healing The Stolen Generations: Archie Roach

== Music ==
- Single Release of the Year: "Something's Got a Hold on Me" – Jessica Mauboy
- Album Release of the Year: Archie Roach – Into the Bloodstream
- Male Artist of the Year: Troy Cassar-Daley
- Female Artist of the Year: Jessica Mauboy
- Band of the Year: Street Warriors
- Most Promising New Talent in Music: Stik n Move
- Hip Hop Artist of the Year: Yung Warriors

== Sport ==
- Sportsman of the Year: Daniel Geale (boxing)
- Female Sportsperson of the Year: Ashleigh Barty (tennis)
- AFL Player of the Year: Adam Goodes
- NRL Player of the Year: Johnathan Thurston
- Most Promising New Talent in Sport: Mariah Williams (field hockey)

== The arts ==
- Film of the Year: The Sapphires
- TV Show of the Year: Redfern Now
- Male Actor of the Year: Luke Carroll (Redfern Now)
- Female Actor of the Year: Deborah Mailman
- Published Book of the Year: NPY Women's Council Aboriginal Corporation for Traditional Healers of Central Australia: Ngangkari
- Dancer of the Year: Ella Havelka
- Visual Artist of the Year: Brenda Croft

== Community ==
- Outstanding Achievement in Aboriginal and Torres Strait Islander Health: Professor Pat Dudgeon
- Aboriginal and Torres Strait Islander Health Worker of the Year: Leonie Morcome (Biripi Aboriginal Medical Service)
- Excellence in Health through the Promotion of Healthy and Smoke Free Lifestyles: Rewrite Your Story Campaign, developed by Puiyurti (Don't Smoke) Tackling Tobacco Program
- Outstanding Achievement in Aboriginal and Torres Strait Islander Employment: Gavin Lester – Koori Job Ready
- Community Broadcaster of the Year: John Harding (3CR Melbourne)
- Outstanding Achievement in Aboriginal and Torres Strait Islander Education: Deadly Sista Girlz and the David Wirrpanda Foundation
- Journalism Story of the Year: NITV News – Shayden and Junaid Thorne in Saudi Arabia
- Outstanding Achievement In Cultural Advancement: Shellie Morris
- Scientist or Science Project of the Year: Gerry Turpin
