= The Tracker (2002 film) =

2002 Australian drama film

- Theatrical film poster
- Directed by: Rolf de Heer
- Written by: Rolf de Heer
- Produced by: Rolf de Heer; Julie Ryan
- Starring: Gary Sweet; David Gulpilil; Damon Gameau
- Cinematography: Ian Jones
- Edited by: Tania Nehme
- Music by: Graham Tardif
- Distributed by: Umbrella Entertainment
- Release date: 2002
- Running time: 98 minutes
- Country: Australia
- Language: English
- Box office: A$818,388 (Australia)

The Tracker is a 2002 Australian Western directed and written by Rolf de Heer and starring David Gulpilil, Gary Sweet and Damon Gameau. It is set in 1922 in outback Australia where a colonial policeman (Sweet) uses the tracking ability of an Indigenous Australian tracker (Gulpilil) to find the alleged murderer of a white woman.

== Plot ==
In 1922, in the Australian outback, an Aboriginal tracker (The Tracker) leads three white men (The Fanatic, The Follower, and The Veteran) in the search for an Aboriginal man (The Fugitive) accused of the murder of a white woman. Along the way, they encounter a group of Aboriginal men and women, with one wearing the uniform of a tracker. After a tense interrogation, the Aboriginals are shot and hanged. The incident leaves The Follower visibly distraught, although The Fanatic tries to justify their actions. From this point, the local Aboriginals begin to take retribution on the group. They first spear their packhorse, which falls off a cliff. With the loss of their supplies; The Veteran tries to convince The Fanatic to turn back, yet he remains adamant about capturing The Fugitive.

As the group continues, The Fanatic begins to become suspicious of The Tracker. When The Tracker leaves the camp one night to find bush tucker, The Fanatic has him chained on his return. Although The Fanatic is distrustful of The Tracker, he has The Tracker show The Follower how he tracks to prove him wrong.

When The Veteran is speared, the group is initially oblivious until alerted by The Tracker who heard it. As a result of his injury, The Veteran lags behind the others and The Fanatic attempts to leave him behind. The Follower resists this idea until The Fanatic points a pistol at him. The group is then stopped by The Tracker, who refuses to move until The Veteran catches up, even when whipped and threatened by The Fanatic. At night, The Fanatic kills The Veteran while everyone sleeps, unaware that he is being watched by The Tracker. After giving Catholic absolution to The Veteran, The Tracker gains a new level of respect from The Follower.

Still in chains held by The Fanatic, The Tracker purposely falls into a watering hole where he attempts to drown The Fanatic, yet both survive. After another horse is speared and flees, the group comes across a group of Aboriginals. The Fanatic quickly begins shooting, killing an elder and child. He is stopped by The Follower, who disarms The Fanatic and places him in chains. After The Follower is knocked out after eating spiked bush tucker at night, The Tracker alone organizes a British-style court to try The Fanatic for murder. He subsequently hangs him and hits his own head with a rock until he bleeds to make The Follower think that local Aboriginals attacked and hanged The Fanatic.

After awakening, The Follower and The Tracker continue their search for The Fugitive until surrounded by Aboriginals. Disarmed, they are led to a group of elders where The Fugitive is also being held. Although The Tracker convinces The Follower that he is innocent of the accused crimes, he carries out Aboriginal justice by spearing The Fugitive in the thigh for the crime of having raped a woman earlier in the film. Returning to camp, they find the body of The Fanatic missing. Bidding The Follower farewell, The Tracker rides off towards his country.

== Cast ==
- David Gulpilil as The Tracker
- Gary Sweet as The Fanatic
- Damon Gameau as The Follower
- Grant Page as The Veteran
- Noel Wilton as The Fugitive

== Production ==
The film was shot in the semi-arid, rugged Arkaroola Sanctuary, in South Australia's Flinders Ranges. De Heer used an intentionally small film crew, saying that "It's all a much better process ...". Lyrics of the soundtrack (written by De Heer) form part of the narrative, and are sung by Archie Roach with music composed by Graham Tardif.

Peter Coad, an artist from South Australia, was hired by de Heer to create paintings that intercut the film to portray the brutal actions not shown. As preliminary work, Coad spent a month in Arkaroola. In total 14 paintings appear in the film, each painted on location in the same ratio used in the film, 1:2. Paul Byrnes, curator of the National Film and Sound Archive's Australian Screen, wrote that this artistic choice was to "disrupt the place that violent scenes usually occupy in violent cinema – there is no payoff for the viewer who wants the thrill of gore. Instead, each killing becomes a kind of instant history."

== Reception ==
On review aggregator Rotten Tomatoes the film has a score of 88% based on reviews from 33 critics, with an average 7.1/10 rating. Based on 16 critics on Metacritic, the film have a score of 71 out of a 100, indicating "generally favorable reviews".

Film critic Roger Ebert gave the film three-and-a-half stars out of four calling the film "haunting" and the performances "powerful". David Stratton described the film as "remarkable". Walter Addiego of the San Francisco Chronicle wrote "See the film mainly for the quiet and powerful work of Gulpilil in the title role". Slant Magazine's Jay Antani was quoted saying "The Tracker is the first significant movie to find its way into American theaters in 2005".

Jane Lydon of the University of Western Australia wrote critically of the film in 2004, saying that as an allegory to frontier violence it simplifies Australian history by constructing a "manichaean opposition between the brutal white trooper and his saintly Aboriginal victim." She also argued that "in representing colonialism as an 'old, unhappy, far-off thing', [The Tracker] ultimately releases us, modern Australian viewers, from responsibility to acknowledge the larger, and continuing effects of colonization in our own time’".

=== Awards and nominations ===
Awards	Category	Subject	Result
AACTA Awards (2002 AFI Awards)	Best Film	Julie Ryan	Nominated
AACTA Awards (2002 AFI Awards)	Best Film	Rolf de Heer	Nominated
AACTA Awards (2002 AFI Awards)	Best Direction	Rolf de Heer	Nominated
AACTA Awards (2002 AFI Awards)	Best Original Screenplay	Rolf de Heer	Nominated
AACTA Awards (2002 AFI Awards)	Best Actor	David Gulpilil	Won
AACTA Awards (2002 AFI Awards)	Best Editing	Tania Nehme	Nominated
AACTA Awards (2002 AFI Awards)	Best Cinematography	Ian Jones	Nominated
ARIA Award	Best Original Soundtrack Album	Graham Tardif	Nominated
ASSG Award	Best Sound		Won
AWGIE Award	Best Film - Original Screenplay	Rolf de Heer	Won
Cinemanila International Film Festival	Best Actor	David Gulpilil	Won
FCCA Awards	Best Film	Julie Ryan	Won
FCCA Awards	Best Film	Rolf de Heer	Won
FCCA Awards	Best Director	Rolf de Heer	Nominated
FCCA Awards	Best Screenplay	Rolf de Heer	Nominated
FCCA Awards	Best Actor	David Gulpilil	Won
FCCA Awards	Best Editing	Tania Nehme	Nominated
FCCA Awards	Best Cinematography	Ian Jones	Won
FCCA Awards	Best Music Score	Graham Tardif	Won
Ghent International Film Festival	Grand Prix Award	Rolf de Heer	Nominated
Ghent International Film Festival	Best Screenplay	Rolf de Heer	Won
Inside Film Awards	Best Feature Film	Julie Ryan	Won
Inside Film Awards	Best Feature Film	Rolf de Heer	Won
Inside Film Awards	Best Direction	Rolf de Heer	Nominated
Inside Film Awards	Best Script	Rolf de Heer	Nominated
Inside Film Awards	Best Actor	David Gulpilil	Won
Inside Film Awards	Best Music	Graham Tardif	Won
Inside Film Awards	Best Cinematography	Ian Jones	Nominated
Inside Film Awards	Best Sound		Nominated
Paris Film Festival	Press Award	Rolf de Heer	Won
Screen Music Award	Best Original Song	Graham Tardif	Won
Valladolid International Film Festival	Jury Special Prize	Rolf de Heer	Won
Valladolid International Film Festival	Golden Spike Award	Rolf de Heer	Nominated
Venice Film Festival	SIGNIS Award - Honorable Mention	Rolf de Heer	Won
Venice Film Festival	Golden Lion	Rolf de Heer	Nominated

== Soundtrack ==
The Tracker

Soundtrack album by Archie Roach
- Released: August 2002
- Genre: World, folk
- Label: Mana Music, Mushroom Records

Archie Roach chronology
Sensual Being (2002)	The Tracker (2002)	The Definitive Collection (2004)

A Soundtrack was released in August 2002. The album is credited to Australian musician Archie Roach on vocals. The songs and music were composed by Graham Tardif. The soundtrack won best soundtrack at the 2002 Film Critics Circle of Australia.

At the ARIA Music Awards of 2002, the album was nominated for ARIA Award for Best Original Soundtrack, Cast or Show Album

Track listing

1. "Wide Open Spaces" (instrumental) - 1:20
2. "Far Away Home" - 3:41
3. "Trouble Coming" - 2:22
4. "Approaching" (instrumental) - 0:29
5. "My People" - 3:49
6. "After the Valley of Sorrow" (instrumental) - 0:29
7. "All Men Choose the Path They Follow" - 5:16
8. "Walk to Destiny" (instrumental) - 1:45
9. "The Chain" - 2:18
10. "A Spear" (instrumental) - 1:05
11. "Contradiction" - 2:02
12. "Life Matters" - 0:44
13. "Friction" (instrumental) - 1:15
14. "Gungalaria" - 3:16
15. "Hanging Tree" (instrumental) - 0:40
16. "My History" - 3:45
17. "Drowning" (instrumental) - 2:02
18. "Hope Always" - 4:27

=== Charts ===
Chart performance for The Tracker
Chart (2002)	Peak position
Australian Albums (ARIA)	171

=== Release history ===
Country	Date	Format	Label	Catalogue
Australia	August 2002	Compact Disc	Mushroom Records	334932

== See also ==
- Cinema of Australia
- South Australian Film Corporation
- List of Australian films
