= Deadly Awards 2004 =

Australian Aboriginal and Torres Strait Islander annual music awards

Deadly Awards 2004 the awards were an annual celebration of Australian Aboriginal and Torres Strait Islander achievement in music, sport, entertainment and community.

== Music ==
- Most Promising New Talent in Music: Casey Donovan
- Single Release of the Year: Talk about love – Christine Anu
- Album Release of the Year: Djarridjarri (blue flag) – Saltwater Band
- Band of the Year: The Donovans
- Music Artist of the Year: Troy Cassar-Daley
- Jimmy Little Award for Lifetime Achievement in Aboriginal and Torres Strait Music: Mandawuy Yunupingu
- Excellence in Film & Theatrical Score: Archie Roach, Ruby Hunter and Paul Grabowsky – Ruby’s Story

== Sport ==
- Most Promising New Talent in Sport: Brett Lee
- Outstanding Achievement in AFL: Gavin Wanganeen
- Outstanding Achievement in Rugby League: Amos Roberts
- Male Sportsperson of the Year: Joshua Ross
- Ella Award for Lifetime Achievement in Aboriginal and Torres Strait Islander Sport: Tony Mundine
- Female Sportsperson of the Year: Michelle Musselwhite

== The arts ==
- Dancer of the Year: Jason Pitt
- Outstanding Achievement in Film and Television: Ernie Dingo
- Outstanding Achievement in Literature: Dr Larissa Behrendt
- Actor of the Year: David Gulpilil
- Visual Artist of the Year: Michael Riley

== Community ==
- DEST Award for Outstanding Achievement in Aboriginal and Torres Strait Islander Education: Chris Sarra
- Outstanding Achievement in Aboriginal and Torres Strait Islander Health: Dr Ngaire Brown
- Broadcaster of the Year: Bevan Rankins, WAAMA 100.9fm
