= Looking for Butter Boy =

Studio album by Archie Roach
- Released: July 1997
- Venue: Port Fairy, Victoria
- Length: 58:25
- Label: Aurora, Mushroom Records
- Producer: Malcolm Burn

Archie Roach chronology
| Jamu Dreaming (1993) | Looking for Butter Boy (1997) | Sensual Being (2002) |

Singles from Looking for Butter Boy
- 1. "Hold On Tight" Released: June 1997; 2. "Watching Over Me" Released: 1997

Looking for Butter Boy is the third studio album by Australian singer songwriter Archie Roach. The album was released in July 1997 and peaked at number 52 on the ARIA Charts. The album was recorded with a small band at a guest house in Port Fairy on the Australian coast.

While recording the album, Roach was swamped with childhood memories, one of which led to the album's title. Roach said “When I was about three years old, I was on the mission where my mother is from. I got into the pantry and covered myself from head to foot in butter. So from then on I was known as "butter boy".”

At the ARIA Music Awards of 1998, the album was nominated for and won two awards; Best Indigenous Release and Best Adult Contemporary Album.

== Reception ==
Professional ratings
Review scores
| Source | Rating |
|---|---|
| AllMusic | 4/5 stars |

Thom Owens from AllMusic said "Looking for Butter Boy retains many of the same themes of parental separation and aboriginal pride of his early releases, it is a harder and more accessible record than his other albums, partially due to the presence of producer Malcolm Burn. What's important, however, is that Roach has retained his eye for lyrical detail and arresting melody, which makes Looking for Butter Boy yet another wonderful record from this underappreciated singer-songwriter."

Bob Townsend from No Depression called it "Roach's most mature, relaxed and expansive set so far". Townsend said "Roach's songs are mostly autobiographical, seemingly simple catalogs of people and places that become bigger and stronger as the details draw you in. On "A Child Was Born Here" he journeys through the scattered haunts of stolen children. On "F Troop" he revisits the Charcoal Lane neighborhood of his youth and recalls the bittersweet moment he met his brother for the first time and on the album's most poignant track, "Louis St. John" he joins with his wife, singer Ruby Hunter, in a mournful affirmation of the persistence of the human spirit."

== Track listing ==
| No. | Title | Writer(s) | Length |
|---|---|---|---|
| 1. | "Beggar Man" | Archie Roach | 3:50 |
| 2. | "A Child Was Born Here" | Roach | 4:21 |
| 3. | "My Grandmother" | Roach | 4:18 |
| 4. | "Dancing (With My Spirit)" | Roach | 4:16 |
| 5. | "F Troop" | Roach | 4:43 |
| 6. | "Mother's Heartbeat" | Roach | 4:55 |
| 7. | "Djabugai Lady" | Roach | 5:07 |
| 8. | "Hold On Tight" | Roach, Mark Seymour | 4:27 |
| 9. | "River Song" | Roach | 4:53 |
| 10. | "Reach for You" | Roach | 3:37 |
| 11. | "Give Unto Caesar" | Roach | 4:13 |
| 12. | "Louis St John" | Roach | 5:32 |
| 13. | "Watching over Me" | Roach | 4:03 |

== Charts ==
| Chart (1997) | Peak position |
|---|---|
| Australian Albums (ARIA) | 52 |

== Release history ==
| Country | Date | Format | Label | Catalogue |
|---|---|---|---|---|
| Australia | July 1997 | Compact Disc | Aurora, Mushroom Records | MUSH320122 |
| United States of America | 1997 | Compact Disc | HighTone Records | HCD8087 |
| Australia | 3 January 1999 | Compact Disc | Mushroom Records | MUSH330082 |
