= Archie Roach =

Aboriginal Australian musician and elder (1956–2022)

Archibald William Roach AC
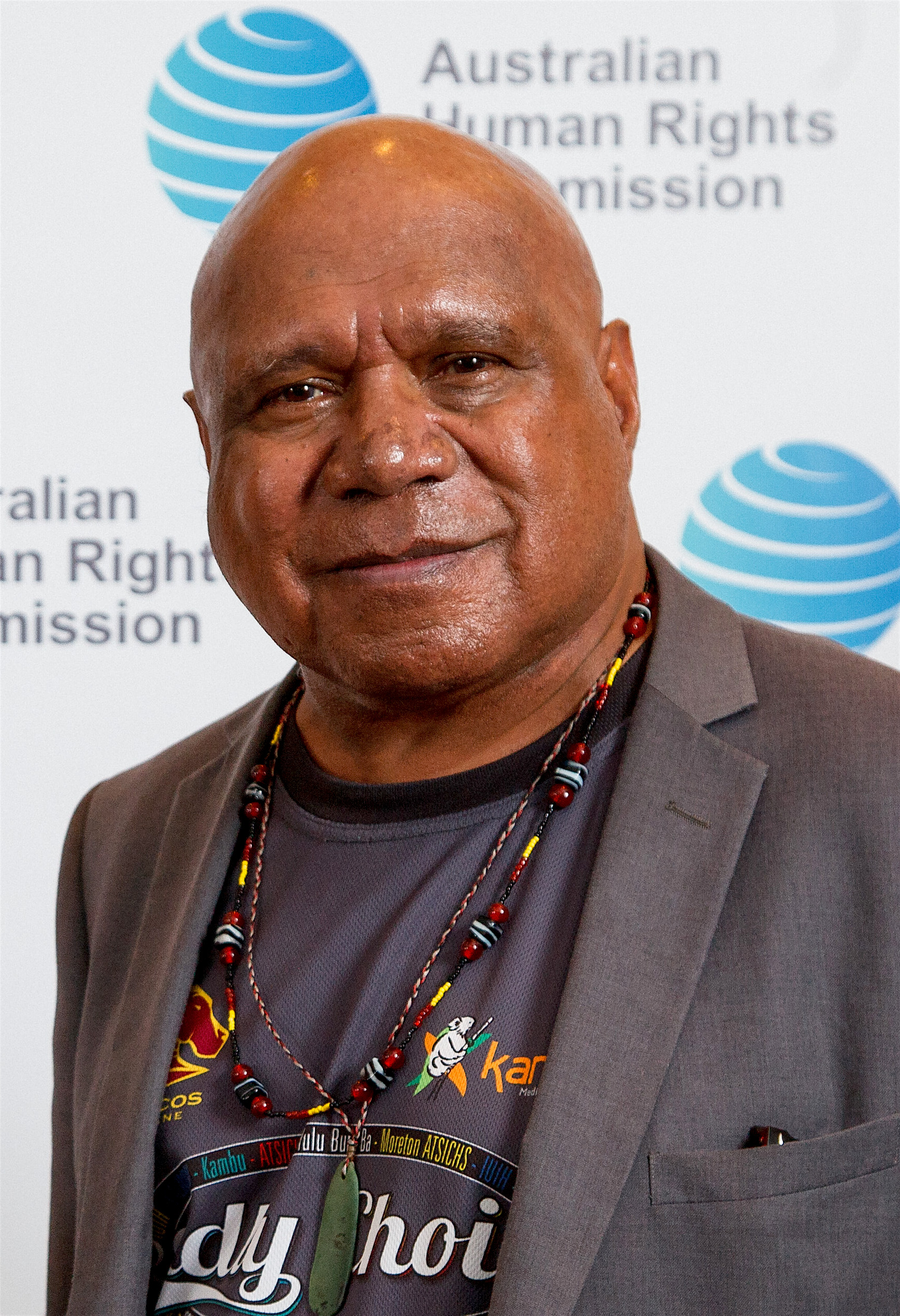
- Roach in 2016

Background information
- Born: Archibald William Roach; 8 January 1956; Mooroopna, Victoria, Australia
- Died: 30 July 2022 (aged 66) Warrnambool, Victoria, Australia
- Genres: Folk, ballads, Aboriginal rock
- Occupations: Musician, songwriter, storyteller
- Instruments: Vocals, six-string guitar
- Years active: 1980s–2022
- Labels: Mushroom, Liberation Music, ABC Music
- Website: Archieroach.com

Archibald William Roach AC (8 January 1956 – 30 July 2022) was an Australian (Gunditjmara and Bundjalung) singer-songwriter and Aboriginal activist. Often referred to as "Uncle Archie", Roach was a Gunditjmara (Kirrae Whurrong/Djab Wurrung) and Bundjalung elder who campaigned for the rights of Aboriginal and Torres Strait Islander people. His wife and musical partner was the singer Ruby Hunter (1955–2010).

Roach first became known for the song "Took the Children Away", which featured on his debut solo album, Charcoal Lane, in 1990. He toured around the globe, headlining and opening shows for Joan Armatrading, Bob Dylan, Billy Bragg, Tracy Chapman, Suzanne Vega and Patti Smith. His work has been recognised by numerous nominations and awards, including a Deadly Award for a "Lifetime Contribution to Healing the Stolen Generations" in 2013. At the 2020 ARIA Music Awards on 25 November 2020, Roach was inducted into their hall of fame. His 2019 memoir and accompanying album were called Tell Me Why.

== Early life ==
Archibald William Roach was born on 8 January 1956 in Mooroopna, Victoria. Roach was of Gunditjmara (Kirrae Whurrong / Djab Wurrung) and Bundjalung heritage.

In 1956, Roach's family, along with the remaining Aboriginal population at Cummeragunja, were rehoused at Rumbalara. The family subsequently moved to Framlingham, where his mother had been born.

At the age of two or three, Roach and his sisters and brothers, along with the other Indigenous Australian children of the Stolen Generations, were forcibly removed from their family by government agencies and placed in an orphanage. After two unpleasant placements in foster care, Roach was eventually fostered by Alex and Dulcie Cox, a family of Scottish immigrants in Melbourne. Their eldest daughter Mary Cox would sing church hymns and taught Roach the basics of guitar and keyboards. Roach's love of music was further fuelled by Alex's collection of Scottish music. "He was a big influence on me — a good influence. I'll love him to the day I die."

At fifteen, Roach was contacted by his natural sister Myrtle, who told him their mother had just died. He spent the next fourteen years on the streets as an alcoholic. Roach met his future wife, Ruby Hunter, at a Salvation Army drop-in centre known as the People's Palace in Adelaide when she was sixteen.

== Career ==
Roach's career spanned three decades, during which he toured extensively, headlining and opening shows for singers such as Joan Armatrading, Bob Dylan, Billy Bragg, Tracy Chapman, Suzanne Vega and Patti Smith.

=== 1989–2000: Charcoal Lane, Jamu Dreaming and Looking for Butter Boy ===
In the late 1980s, Roach and Hunter formed a band, the Altogethers, with several other Indigenous Australians and moved to Melbourne. At the urging of Henry "Uncle Banjo" Clark, Roach wrote his first song, "Took the Children Away", which he performed on a community radio station in Melbourne and on an Indigenous current affairs program in 1988. Australian musician Paul Kelly invited Roach to open his concert early in 1989, where he performed "Took the Children Away", a song telling the story of the Stolen Generations and his own experience of being forcibly removed from his family. His performance was met with stunned silence, followed by shattering applause.

In 1990, with the encouragement of Kelly, Roach recorded his debut solo album, Charcoal Lane, which was released in May 1990. The album was certified gold and awarded two ARIA Awards at the 1991 ceremony. The album included "Took the Children Away" which became one of the most important songs in Australia's contemporary history. In 1990, Australia's Human Rights and Equal Opportunity Commission's awarded the song its first Human Rights Award for songwriting. Charcoal Lane featured in the top 50 albums for 1992 by Rolling Stone magazine.

In May 1993, Roach released his second studio album, Jamu Dreaming. The album was recorded with musical assistance from David Bridie, Tiddas, Paul Kelly, Vika and Linda Bull, Ruby Hunter, Dave Arden and Joe Geia. The album peaked at number 55 on the ARIA Charts.

In 1995, Roach toured extensively throughout the US, Canada, the UK and Europe. He returned to Australia to record the title track for ATSIC's Native Title CD, Our Home, Our Land, with Tiddas, Kev Carmody, Bart Willoughby, Shane Howard and Bunna Laurie. In 1996, Roach performed as part of a presentation to the Human Rights Commission's Inquiry into the Stolen Generations, before embarking on a national tour as a guest of Tracy Chapman.

In October 1997, Roach released his third studio album, Looking for Butter Boy, which was recorded on his traditional land at Port Fairy in south-western Victoria. The album's lead single, "Hold On Tight", won the ARIA Award for Best Indigenous Release in 1997 and the album won the same award and the Best Adult Contemporary Album at the 1998 award ceremony.

=== 2001–2009: Sensual Being and Journey ===
In July 2002, Roach released his fourth studio album, Sensual Being, which peaked at number 59 on the ARIA charts. In 2002, he worked on the Rolf de Heer film The Tracker.

In 2004, Roach and Hunter collaborated with the Australian Art Orchestra (AAO) and Paul Grabowsky to create a concert titled Ruby's Story. Ruby tells the story of Ruby Hunter through music and the spoken word, from her birth near a billabong on the banks of the Murray River, through the Stolen Generations, search for identity and the discovery of hope through love. The production debuted at the Message Sticks Festival at the Sydney Opera House in June 2004, to good reviews. In 2004, the soundtrack, Ruby, won the Deadly Award for Excellence in Film & Theatrical Score, and the show went on to tour nationally and internationally until 2009. The soundtrack was released as an album on CD and as a digital download in 2005.

In October 2004 a new concert, once again a collaboration with Hunter, Grabowsky and the AAO, entitled Kura Tungar – Songs from the River, premiered at the Melbourne International Arts Festival, which was directed by Robyn Archer that year. The concert, which was directed by Patrick Nolan, told stories from the two performers' lives, and featured songs about the Murray River and Ngarrindjeri Country, Ruby's home. The music used Roach and Hunter's lyrics and chords combined with Grabowsky and the AAO's contemporary jazz orchestration. It played to full houses which gave standing ovations and was later performed at the Sydney Opera House and Adelaide Festival Centre. In 2005 Kura Tungar won the Helpmann Award for the Best Contemporary Australian Concert at the 5th Helpmann Awards. A documentary film of the preparation for the performance, including interviews and parts of the performance, directed by Philippa Bateman and called Wash My Soul in the Rivers Flow, was released in 2021.

In October 2007, Roach released Journey, an album of songs as a companion piece to a documentary film called Liyarn Ngarn, made with Roach, Patrick Dodson and Pete Postlethwaite.

In October 2009 at the Melbourne International Arts Festival, Roach performed in the world premiere of the musical theatre production of Dirtsong, created by Black Arm Band theatre company. The songs were written by Alexis Wright, with some sung in Indigenous languages. The show was reprised as the closing show at the 2014 Adelaide Festival. Other performers included Trevor Jamieson (2014 only), Lou Bennett, Emma Donovan, and Paul Dempsey.

In November 2009, ABC Music released previously unreleased Roach recordings from 1988 under the album title 1988.

=== 2010–2016: Into the Bloodstream and Let Love Rule ===
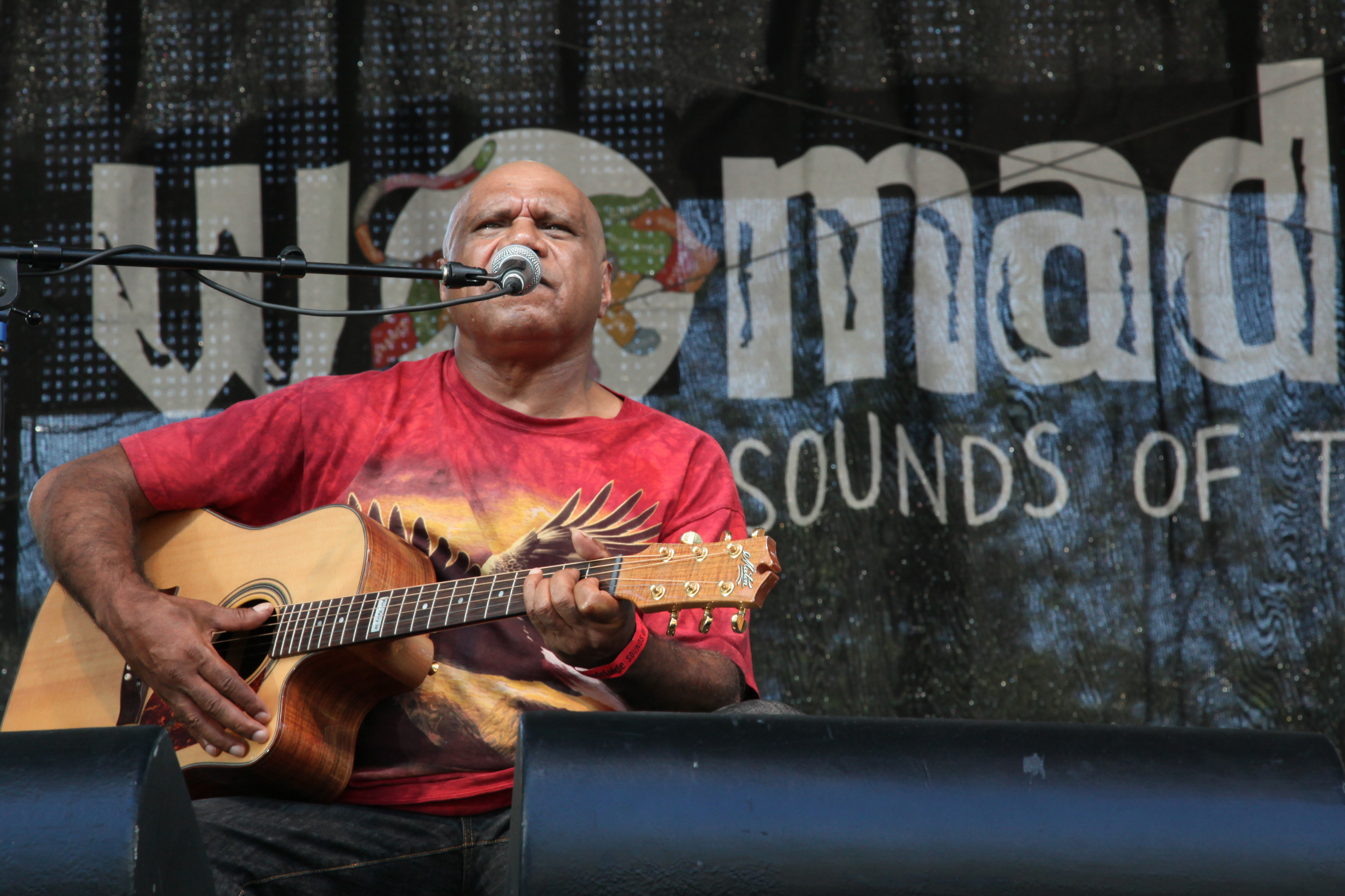
Roach performing at WOMADelaide in 2011

In October 2012, Roach released Into the Bloodstream, an album he described as being built on pain following the death of his wife in February 2010. In 2013 he won a Deadly Award for Album of the Year for this album, as well as a "Lifetime Contribution to Healing the Stolen Generations".

In October 2013, Roach released Creation, a 4-CD box set of his first four studio albums. The album was released to coincide with the premiere of Roach's new live show, also entitled Creation, which debuted at the inaugural Boomerang Festival in Byron Bay from 4 to 6 October 2013.

At the APRA Music Awards of 2015 2015, Roach (and Shane Howard) won Best Original Song Composed for the Screen "The Secret River" from The Secret River.

In November 2015, Roach celebrated the 25th anniversary of Charcoal Lane with a deluxe remastered edition. The new edition included a second disc featuring previously unreleased Triple J – Live At The Wireless recordings and new interpretations of classic Charcoal Lane material by various artists. In November and December 2015, Roach undertook a national tour to celebrate the album's 25th anniversary.

In November 2016, Roach released his seventh studio album, Let Love Rule, which peaked at number 24 on the ARIA Charts, becoming his highest charting album to date.

=== 2017–2022: The Concert Collection 2012–2018 and Tell Me Why ===
At the APRA Music Awards of 2017 in March 2017, Roach won the Ted Albert Award for Outstanding Services to Australian Music.

In April 2018, Roach performed at the Commonwealth Games closing ceremony on the Gold Coast with Amy Shark.

In May 2019, Roach released The Concert Collection 2012–2018 and in July 2019, was nominated for two awards at the 2019 National Indigenous Music Awards.

On 1 November 2019, Roach published a memoir entitled Tell Me Why: The Story of My Life and My Music, and released a companion album, Tell Me Why, on the same day. His book was shortlisted for the 2020 Victorian Premier's Prize for Nonfiction and won the 2020 Indie Book Non-Fiction Award. It also won the Audiobook of the Year at the 2021 Australian Book Industry Awards. The album's lead single "Open Up Your Eyes" is the first song Roach ever wrote, dating back to the late 1970s, but had not before been recorded. Tell Me Why became Roach's first top-ten album on the ARIA Charts.

In 2020, Roach appeared in the documentary film The Skin of Others, which explores the life of Aboriginal World War I soldier Douglas Grant and features Balang Tom E. Lewis and Max Cullen . Roach performed Ballad of the Bridge Builders. This song was written by David Bridie and Tom Murray, and won the 2020 Screen Music Award for Best Original Song Composed for the Screen.

Wash My Soul in the River's Flow (2021), written and directed by Philippa Bateman and produced by Bateman, Kate Hodges and Roach, is a feature-length documentary film based on the 2004 concert Kura Tungar-Songs from the River, featuring Roach, Hunter, Paul Grabowsky and the Australian Art Orchestra, in which Hunter and Roach sing about the Murray River and Ngarrindjeri lands. The film also tells of the love story between Hunter and Roach, and is interspersed with vision of The Coorong. The film had its world premiere at the Brisbane International Film Festival in October 2021 and was an official selection for the Sydney Film Festival and the Melbourne International Film Festival in December 2021.

In March 2022, Roach released his career-spanning anthology, titled My Songs: 1989–2021, which was subsequently nominated as the Album of the Year for the 2022 National Indigenous Music Awards two weeks before his death. At the 2022 ARIA Music Awards a special tribute in his honour will have Budjerah, Jessica Mauboy and Thelma Plum performing "One Song" from that album.

In 2023, the Roach and Hunter authored book Songs from the Kitchen Table was released, including lyrics, stories, photographs.

== Activism ==
In 2013, shortly after receiving his Lifetime Deadly Award, Roach called on the recently elected prime minister, Tony Abbott, for an end to the Northern Territory Intervention.

== Discography ==
- Charcoal Lane (1990)
- Jamu Dreaming (1993)
- Looking for Butter Boy (1997)
- Sensual Being (2002)
- Journey (2007)
- Into the Bloodstream (2012)
- Let Love Rule (2016)
- Dancing with My Spirit (2018)
- Tell Me Why (2019)
- The Songs of Charcoal Lane (2020)

== Personal life ==
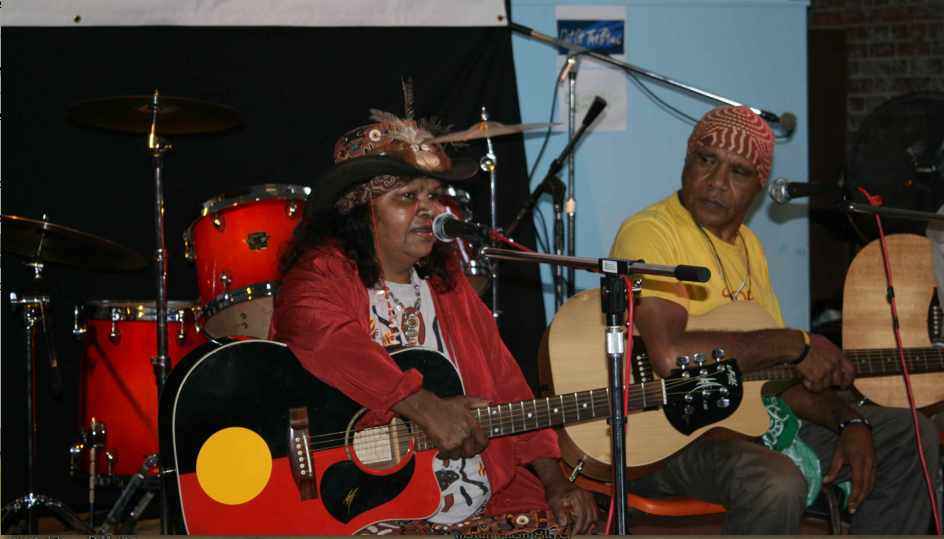
Roach (right) with Ruby Hunter at the 2009 Tamworth Country Music Festival

Roach was married to the singer Ruby Hunter (died 2010) who was also his musical partner. They had two sons, Amos and Eban. They also had three foster children, Kriss, Terrence and Arthur.

On 14 October 2010, Roach suffered a stroke while working in the Kimberley region. After recuperating, he returned to live performance in April 2011. He also survived lung cancer, due to early diagnosis in 2011 and major surgery.

== Death and legacy ==
Roach died on 30 July 2022 at Warrnambool Base Hospital. His sons, Amos and Eban, have given permission for his name and image to be posthumously used freely "so that his legacy will continue to inspire". This permission is limited to news. Tributes were paid to his memory by prominent names in arts, politics and sport including Australian prime minister Anthony Albanese, Victorian premier Daniel Andrews and musicians including Emma Donovan, Briggs, John Schumann, Alice Skye, Emily Wurramara, Paul Kelly, Billy Bragg, Mark Seymour, Midnight Oil and Shane Howard.

In 2022, two side-by-side pillar-shaped monuments were erected on the shores of Lake Bonney at Barmera, in homage to Roach and Hunter. A glass mosaic artwork on the front side of each monument depict Roach's totem, the eagle, and Hunter's Ngarrindjeri totem, the pelican (nori). In 2024, a statue of Roach and Hunter was erected at Atherton Gardens in Fitzroy.

Roach was regarded as giving a voice to the stories of many Aboriginal people and offering comfort and healing in his words and music. Euahlayi scholar Bhiamie Williamson, who wrote his PhD thesis on "Indigenous Men and Masculinities", describes the concept of the "Emu Man", based on the male emu, which is devoted to his family and chicks and sits on the eggs. Roach was considered a role model who represented an image shown too rarely in public discourse. Williamson writes:

He gave us – and all of Australia – an image of an Aboriginal man, tender and humble. An image long denied us ... Through his life, his dedication to Aunty Ruby, his devotion to his sons, his work with disengaged youth and his profound love for his people, Uncle Archie gave the nation an image of an Aboriginal man seldom found in the national psyche ...

== Archie Roach Foundation ==
The Archie Roach Foundation was established in 2014 to nurture talent in young Aboriginal and Torres Strait Islander people and to offer them opportunities in the arts, to provide connection to culture and healing. As of 2022, the board of directors included Roach, Uncle Jack Charles and four other people, with Charles and Rhoda Roberts as ambassadors of the foundation. The foundation has supported hundreds and inspired thousands more young people. His work in youth detention centres continues to affect those who listened to him.

== Honours ==
- In 2011, Roach was one of the first people inducted to the Victorian Aboriginal Honour Roll.
- In 2015, Roach was honoured in the Queen's Birthday Honours list as a Member of the Order of Australia (AM) for services to music as a singer-songwriter, guitarist and a prominent supporter of social justice.
- In 2020, Roach was named the 2020 Victoria Australian of the Year.
- In 2023, Roach was posthumously promoted to Companion of the Order of Australia (AC) for "eminent service to the performing arts as a songwriter and musician, to Indigenous rights and reconciliation, and through support for emerging First Nations artists".

== Recognition and awards ==
"Took the Children Away" was added to the National Film and Sound Archive's Sounds of Australia registry in 2013.

=== AIR Awards ===
The Australian Independent Record Awards (commonly known informally as AIR Awards) is an annual awards night to recognise, promote and celebrate the success of Australia's Independent Music sector.

Year	Nominee / work	Award	Result
2017	Let Love Rule	Best Independent Blues and Roots Album	Nominated

=== APRA Awards ===
The APRA Awards are held in Australia and New Zealand by the Australasian Performing Right Association to recognise songwriting skills, sales and airplay performance by its members annually. They commenced in 1982.

Year	Nominee / work	Award	Result	Ref.
2017	Archie Roach	Ted Albert Award for Outstanding Services to Australian Music	awarded	
2017	"It's Not Too late"	Song of the Year	Shortlisted	
2020	"Open Up Your Eyes"	Song of the Year	Shortlisted	
2021	"Tell Me Why" (with Sally Dastey)	Song of the Year	Shortlisted	
2023	"One Song"	Song of the Year	Nominated	

=== ARIA Awards ===
Roach has received ten ARIA Music Awards from twenty-three nominations.

Year	Nominee / work	Award	Result
1991	Charcoal Lane	Best New Talent	Won
1991	Charcoal Lane	Best Indigenous Release	Won
1991	Charcoal Lane	Breakthrough Artist – Album	Nominated
1991	"Took the Children Away"	Breakthrough Artist – Single	Nominated
1992	"Down City Streets"	Best Indigenous Release	Nominated
1994	Jamu Dreaming	Best Indigenous Release	Nominated
1997	"Hold On Tight"	Best Indigenous Release	Won
1998	Looking for Butter Boy	Best Indigenous Release	Won
1998	Looking for Butter Boy	Best Adult Contemporary Album	Won
2002	Sensual Being	Best Adult Contemporary Album	Nominated
2002	Richard Pleasance & Paul Kelly for Sensual Being	Producer of the Year	Nominated
2002	The Tracker	Best Original Soundtrack Album	Nominated
2008	Journey	Best World Music Album	Nominated
2010	1988	Best World Music Album	Nominated
2013	Into the Bloodstream	Best Blues & Roots Album	Nominated
2017	Let Love Rule	Best Blues & Roots Album	Nominated
2020	Tell Me Why	Best Male Artist	Won
2020	Tell Me Why	Best Adult Contemporary Album	Won
2020	Tell Me Why	Best Independent Release	Nominated
2020	Archie Roach	Hall of Fame	Inductee
2021	The Songs of Charcoal Lane	Best Blues & Roots Album	Won
2021	The Songs of Charcoal Lane	Best Independent Release	Nominated
2022	"One Song"	Best Independent Release	Won

=== Australia Council for the Arts ===
The Australia Council for the Arts is an arts funding and advisory body for the Government of Australia. Since 1993 it has awarded a Red Ochre Award. It is presented to an outstanding Indigenous Australian (Aboriginal Australian or Torres Strait Islander) artist for lifetime achievement.

Year	Nominee / work	Award	Result
2011	himself	Red Ochre Award	Awarded

=== Deadly Awards ===
The Deadly Awards (commonly known simply as The Deadlys) was an annual celebration of Australian Aboriginal and Torres Strait Islander achievement in music, sport, entertainment and community. They ran from 1996 to 2013.

Year	Nominee / work	Award	Result
1997	"himself"	Male Artist of the Year	Won
1998	"himself"	Male Artist of the Year	Won
2002	"himself"	Male Artist of the Year	Won
2002	Sensual Being	Album of the Year	Won
2003	"himself"	Outstanding Contribution to Aboriginal and Torres Strait Islander Music	Won
2004	Ruby (with Ruby Hunter and Paul Grabowsky)	Excellence in Film & Theatrical Score	Won
2010	1988	Album of the Year	Won
2013	Into the Bloodstream	Album of the Year	Won
2013	"himself"	The Lifetime Contribution Award For Healing The Stolen Generations	inductee

=== Don Banks Music Award ===
The Don Banks Music Award was established in 1984 to publicly honour a senior artist of high distinction who has made an outstanding and sustained contribution to music in Australia. It was founded by the Australia Council in honour of Don Banks, Australian composer, performer and the first chair of its music board.

Year	Nominee / work	Award	Result
2015	Archie Roach	Don Banks Music Award	awarded

=== Helpmann Awards ===
The Helpmann Awards is an awards show, celebrating live entertainment and performing arts in Australia, presented by industry group Live Performance Australia (LPA) since 2001. In 2018, Roach received the JC Williamson Award, the LPA's highest honour, for their life's work in live performance.

Year	Nominee / work	Award	Result
2005	Kura Tungar: Songs from the River (with Ruby Hunter)	Best Australian Contemporary Concert	Won
2013	Into the Bloodstream	Best Australian Contemporary Concert	Nominated
2018	Himself	JC Williamson Award	awarded

=== J Awards ===
The J Awards are an annual series of Australian music awards that were established by the Australian Broadcasting Corporation's youth-focused radio station Triple J. They commenced in 2005.

Year	Nominee / work	Award	Result
2020	Archie Roach	Double J Artist of the Year	Won

=== Mo Awards ===
The Australian Entertainment Mo Awards (commonly known informally as the Mo Awards) were annual Australian entertainment industry awards. They recognised achievements in live entertainment in Australia from 1975 to 2016. Archie Roach won two awards in that time.

Year	Nominee / work	Award	Result (wins only)
1991	Archie Roach	Folk Performer of the Year	Won
1992	Archie Roach	Folk Performer of the Year	Won

=== Music Victoria Awards ===
The Music Victoria Awards are an annual awards night celebrating Victorian music.

Year	Nominee / work	Award	Result
2013	himself	Best Indigenous Act	Nominated
2013	himself	Best Male Artist	Nominated
2013	Into the Bloodstream	Best Folk Roots Album	Won
2015	himself	Hall of Fame	inductee
2017	himself	Best Indigenous Act	Nominated

=== National Dreamtime Awards ===
The National Dreamtime Awards are an annual celebration of Australian Aboriginal and Torres Strait Islander achievement in sport, arts, academia and community. They commenced in 2017.

Year	Nominee / work	Award	Result
2018	himself	Achievement award	Won

=== National Indigenous Music Awards ===
The National Indigenous Music Awards (NIMA) recognise excellence, dedication, innovation and outstanding contribution in the Northern Territory music industry. They commenced in 2004.

Year	Nominee / work	Award	Result
2013	"himself"	Hall of Fame Inductee	Inductee
2013	Into the Bloodstream	Album of the Year	Won
2013	Into the Bloodstream	Cover Art of the Year	Won
2013	"Song to Sing"	Film Clip of the Year	Won
2013	"Song to Sing"	Song of the Year	Nominated
2018	himself	Artist of the Year	Nominated
2019	"himself"	Artist of the Year	Nominated
2019	The Concert Collection 2012–2018	Album of the Year	Nominated
2020	"himself"	Artist of the Year	Nominated
2020	Tell Me Why	Album of the Year	Won
2022	My Songs: 1989–2021	Album of the Year	Nominated

=== Sidney Myer Performing Arts Awards ===
The Sidney Myer Performing Arts Awards commenced in 1984 and recognise outstanding achievements in dance, drama, comedy, music, opera, circus and puppetry.

Year	Nominee / work	Award	Result
2009	Archie Roach (with Ruby Hunter)	Individual Award	awarded
