= 1988 (Archie Roach album) =

Compilation album by Archie Roach
- Released: November 2009
- Recorded: 1988
- Label: ABC Music

Archie Roach chronology
Journey (2007)	1988 (2009)	Into the Bloodstream (2012)

1988 (also known as Music Deli Presents Archie Roach 1988) is a compilation album by Australian singer song writer Archie Roach.

1988 is the second in a series of artist releases from the live archives of ABC Radio's Music Deli program. It captures some of the first ever recordings of young Indigenous songwriter Archie Roach. The majority of the album was recorded in 1988 while other tracks were recorded live at Melbourne Concert Hall when Roach supported Yothu Yindi in January 1992 and The "Christmas Eve" song with Paul Kelly was also recorded live in ABC studio in 1990. A bonus at the end of the CD is an interview with Archie Roach recorded on 1 March 1988, followed by a short follow up interview 20 years later recorded in September 2008.

At the ARIA Music Awards of 2010, the album was nominated for ARIA Award for Best World Music Album.

== Background and release ==
Paul Petran says in his liner notes on the album "In 1988 much of Australia was celebrating 200 years of white settlement but a young Archie Roach was expressing in song what many who weren't celebrating were feeling. For many indigenous people there was anger, despair, disadvantage, land rights battles and deaths in custody. Archie dealt with this by writing songs about his own experiences and feelings - and then performing these songs to whomever would listen."

Roach said “I started out back in 87 when I started writing "Took the Children Away" and I also started writing songs in protest of the bicentennial. I wanted to release these songs just to let younger people know what it was like for Aboriginal people back in 1988... We were looking for change of course but the main point was to make a stand against the bicentennial and to let people know there is a black history in this country.” Roach and his manager listened to these recordings again in 2007 and decided it was the right time to release them.

== Track listing ==
No.	Title	Writer(s)	Length
1.	"Weeping in the Forest"	Archie Roach	6:03
2.	"Native Born"	Roach	5:19
3.	"Sister Brother"	Roach	5:54
4.	"Archie's Introduction to "Took the Children Away""	Roach	0:24
5.	"Took the Children Away"	Roach	6:36
6.	"Bicentennial Blues"	Roach	5:08
7.	"Beautiful Child"	Roach	6:27
8.	"Archie's Introduction to "Give Us Back Our Dancing""	Roach	0:07
9.	"Give Us Back Our Dancing"	Roach	6:15
10.	"F Troop"	Roach	4:36
11.	"Reach for You"	Roach	3:26
12.	"Christmas Eve"		3:32
13.	"The People of Sorrow"	Roach	5:27
14.	"Blood and Tears"	Roach	6:33
15.	"Keep Your Handouts Give Us Back Our Land"	Roach	5:32
16.	"Archie Roach Interview 1988"	Roach	3:59
17.	"Archie Roach Interview 2008"	Roach	2:55

== Release history ==
Country	Date	Format	Label	Catalogue
Australia	13 November 2009	Compact Disc; Digital download	ABC Music	1791253
