= One Song (Archie Roach song) =

Single by Archie Roach

from the album My Songs: 1989–2021
- Released: 11 February 2022
- Recorded: 2021
- Length: 6:02
- Label: Bloodlines
- Songwriter(s): Archie Roach

Archie Roach singles chronology
"Rally Round the Drum" (2019)	"One Song" (2022)	"I'm Gonna Fly" (2023)

"One Song" is a song written and performed by Australian singer songwriter Archie Roach. The song was released in February 2022 as the lead and only single from his compilation album My Songs: 1989–2021.

In a video message upon release, Roach said the inspiration for the song is similar to that of "a place of fire" saying "that we all come from one place".

At the 2022 ARIA Music Awards, the song won the ARIA Award for Best Independent Release. Jessica Mauboy, Budjerah and Thelma Plum performed the song as a tribute to Archie Roach at the ceremony.

At the APRA Music Awards of 2023, the song was shortlisted for Song of the Year.

== Reception ==
Greta Brereton from NME said "It's a sparse, yet incredibly moving story of Country and connection, and passing cultures on to future generations. Backed by gentle acoustic guitar, the 66-year-old Gunditjmara and Bundjalung artist lets his warm voice carry the beautiful lyrics, a testament to his status as a music icon."
