= Australian Art Orchestra =

Ensemble founded by Paul Grabowsky in 1994

- Origin: Melbourne, Australia
- Genres: Jazz, world, Experimental
- Years active: 1994–present
- Labels: ABC Classics, AAO Recordings, Jazzhead
- Members: Aaron Choulai Artistic Director (2023- ); Peter Knight (musician) Artistic Director (2013-23); Erkki Veltheim; Vanessa Tomlinson; Simon Barker; Martin Ng; Andrea Keller; Samuel Pankhurst; Sandy Evans; Gian Slater; Joe Talia; Adrian Sherriff; Tony Hicks; Stephen Magnusson; Niko Schauble; Tristram Williams; Scott Tinkler; Carl Dewhurst; Eugene Ball; Jem Savage; Lizzy Welsh; Christopher Hale; Matthias Schack-Arnott
- Past members: Paul Grabowsky, founding AD, piano
- Website: www.aao.com.au

The Australian Art Orchestra (AAO) is one of Australia's leading contemporary ensembles. Founded by pianist Paul Grabowsky in 1994, it has been led by composer/trumpeter/sound artist Peter Knight since 2013 and led by pianist/composer/producer Aaron Choulai since 2023. The Orchestra explores relationships between musical disciplines and cultures, imagining new musical concepts that reference how 21st century Australia responds to its cultural and musical history.

The AAO regularly tours both in Australia and internationally.

== History ==
=== With Paul Grabowsky 1994-2013 ===
The intention of the Australian Art Orchestra's work has always been to playfully explore the balance between avant-garde and traditional Jazz forms, allowing the incorporation of diverse influences to reference the importance this plays in the history of jazz.

The AAO began as a contemporary jazz orchestra but early on developed distinctive cross-cultural collaborations. These included Into the Fire and The Chennai Tapes. In 1996 the Australian Art Orchestra first collaborated with one of South India's most significant musicians, mridangam virtuoso Kaaraikkudi R Mani in India. In 1999 this collaboration created Into the Fire, a piece bridging Australian and Indian traditions arranged for the orchestra by Adrian Sherriff. This piece was released on CD in 2000 on ABC classics. The association with Kaaraikkudi R Mani became a long-term project that toured all over the world, becoming an Australian world music collaboration. This partnership also produced the album, The Chennai Tapes and touring group,Two Oceans. Arguably, the collaboration between Mani and AAO developed a completely original style of music, a meeting between the Carnatic tradition and Western jazz.

In 1997 the AAO drew inspiration from J.S. Bach's St Matthew Passion. Originally, five Australian Art Orchestra composers, Doug de Vries, Paul Grabowsky, John Rodgers, Niko Schäuble and Alister Spence, were tasked to interpret five movements from the Bach original. Their compositions reimagined Bach's work rather than adapted it. Passion continues to progress and evolve for the AAO. Orchestra collaborators Ruby Hunter and Archie Roach were commissioned by the 2005 Festival de Mexico Centro Historico to compose and perform three love songs to add to the Passion composition. Another movement was commissioned in 2014 by Soundstreams in Toronto who asked Nicole Lizée to expand the piece with her own interpretation for Passion's Canadian premiere with a work called Hymns to Pareidolia.

The piece Testimony composed by Sandy Evans in 1995, was successfully transformed into a stage show by The Australian Art Orchestra in 2002. The composition is about the life of Charlie 'Bird' Parker and follows an epic poem by Pulitzer Prize winner Yusef Komunyakaa. The Australian Art Orchestra record label was founded in 2008.

In 2004 Grabowsky began a collaboration with Ruby Hunter and Archie Roach, two musicians whose life stories inspired Ruby's Story. Ruby was taken away from he family as a child, only learning of her aboriginal heritage when reading a picture-book at school about Captain Cook. She spent time living on the streets and met fellow musician Archie at a Salvation Army centre in Adelaide. The compositions explore these themes and the redemption they found in each other when they met, concluding with them travelling back to Ruby's country beside the Murray to raise a family. Tracks from the CD Ruby still often play on Australian radio and the album receives good reviews. Ruby was the first release on the Australian Art Orchestra record label.

Other cross-cultural collaborations include The Theft of Sita with musicians from Indonesia premiering the piece at Melbourne Festival on 1 November 2000. Theft of Sita is a retelling of the epic Sanskrit legend The Ramayana and draws on Balinese shadow puppetry. This project toured all over the world and vastly increased the AAO's following. Crossing Roper Bar was created with musicians from Arnhem Land from 2005. This linking of jazz traditions with such a venerable ancient culture was considered revolutionary. A recording was made in Alan Eaton Studio, St Kilda in 2009, during a Melbourne residency, following many live performances of the piece. There was an official tour featuring Benjamin Wilfred and the Young Wagilak Group in 2010, when the CD was released on the AAO label. The goal of the project was to inspire a wider audience to look into the traditions of their ancestors, the original people of Australia in the hope of inspiring respectful engagement.

=== With Peter Knight 2013-2023 ===
Since Grabowsky's departure the Australian Art Orchestra developed an even more contemporary style under Peter Knight's direction. Knight became Artistic Director and co-CEO in 2013, succeeding founding director Paul Grabowsky who had led the ensemble for nearly 20 years. During his tenure from 2013 to 2023, Knight restructured the organisation and commissioned over 100 new works and collaborations from diverse international and Australian artists.

Under Knight's leadership, the AAO secured multi-year funding from the City of Melbourne, Creative Victoria, and the Ian Potter Cultural Trust for its Pathfinders – Music Leadership Program, an initiative supporting emerging artists and music leaders. The Orchestra also launched the 25th Anniversary Solo Series in 2019, featuring monthly video releases of solo improvisations by twelve AAO collaborators.

Knight instigated collaborations with international composers, including iconic American composer Alvin Lucier. In 2016, the AAO presented Exit Ceremonies in collaboration with Ensemble Offspring at Melbourne Town Hall, featuring the world premiere of Lucier's Swing Bridge, a major work commissioned by Peter Knight for the Melbourne Town Hall Grand Organ. Other significant collaborations included Canadian composer Nicole Lizée and Japanese composer Keiichiro Shibuya. The development of the Orchestra's collaborations with Australian indigenous musicians, and musicians from Asia has continued under Knight's direction receiving critical acclaim.

The Australian Art Orchestra has also drawn significant praise for its ground breaking Creative Music Intensive program which brings musicians from around the world together in Tarraleah, in the Tasmanian Central Highlands, to share ideas about collaborating musically across cultures. This program was initiated by Peter Knight in 2014 and its first iteration was in Cairns.

In 2022, Australian Art Orchestra was acknowledged with a National Luminary AMC/APRA Art Music Award.

In 2016 the Creative Music Intensive was nominated for the AMC Art Music Award for Excellence in Music Education. In the same year the AAO premiered Peter Knight's Diomira, inspired by Italo Calvino, which was also nominated for an AMC Art Music Award for Instrumental Work of the Year. The piece went on to win the 2016 Albert H. Maggs Composition Award. In 2017 Diomira was extended to a full length concert work with video by artist, Scott Morrison, and premiered as part of the Melbourne Festival. This work was released on the Hospital Hill label on an album called Crossed and Recrossed, which also features Knight's work The Plains. The Plains was inspired by author Gerald Murnane and premiered at Jazztopad festival in Poland in 2018.

Water Pushes Sand merged Jazz and Sichuan folk music styles and featured Zheng Sheng Li, a Sichuan 'face changing' dancer along with four other musicians from Cheng Du in Sichuan, and five AAO musicians. Composer Erik Griswold and percussionist Vanessa Tomlinson (together known as Clocked Out) spent 15 years researching Sichuan's music and culture before this work was created.

The world premiere of Water Pushes Sand was at OzAsia Festival in 2015. A full house show at Arts Centre Melbourne as a part of Melbourne Festival 2015 followed.

The CD, released in 2016 was nominated for '2016 Jazz Work of the Year' at the APRA/AMC Art Music Awards and an ARIA Award for Jazz Work of the Year, receiving positive reviews in the media. In 2017 Water Pushes Sand toured Australia including Darwin Festival. It also went on to tour in China including to Chengdu, Shanghai Arts Festival in 2019

In 2019 the AAO also headlined JazzFest Berlin performing works by Peter Knight and Julia Reidy, and also undertook a major collaboration with Anthony Braxton called Sonic Genome.

In 2021, the AAO launched the First Nations Artist Residency Program in partnership with the Melbourne International Jazz Festival and Songlines Aboriginal Music Corporation, appointing Amos Roach as the inaugural artist in residence. The same year saw the release of three significant albums including Closed Beginnings (featuring Tariro Mavondo, Reuben Lewis and Peter Knight), which won the 2021 APRA/AMCOS Art Music Award for electroacoustic/sound art Work of the Year.

In 2022, the AAO premiered Fresh Water Salt Water as part of the UK Australia Season, with performances at Melbourne Recital Centre and Huddersfield Contemporary Music Festival. Mode Records also released Swing Bridge by Alvin Lucier, featuring works commissioned and directed by Peter Knight for the AAO.

Peter Knight concluded his tenure as Artistic Director in 2023, succeeded by pianist/composer/producer Aaron Choulai.

=== Aaron Choulai (2023–present) ===
Aaron Choulai was appointed as Artistic Director in 2023, becoming the third leader of the Australian Art Orchestra following Paul Grabowsky and Peter Knight. A pianist, composer and producer, Choulai brought extensive international experience having been based in Tokyo for 15 years prior to his appointment, where he developed deep connections to the Japanese hip-hop and improvised music scenes.

Under Choulai's artistic direction, the AAO has continued to explore new directions that reflect connections to the Asia-Pacific music scene, jazz, and hip-hop traditions. In 2023, Choulai premiered Raw Denshi, a work originally released in 2020 and reimagined for the AAO, featuring Japanese hip-hop pioneers Kojoe and Hikaru Tanaka. The work premiered at The Substation in Melbourne and at MONA in Hobart, marking the first major performance of Choulai's new artistic program for the AAO.

The AAO continued the First Nations Artist Residency Program under Choulai's leadership. Bumpy, a Noongar singer-songwriter, was appointed as the 2023/24 First Nations Artist in Residence and premiered her commissioned work Tooni at the 2024 Melbourne International Jazz Festival. Adam Manning, a Kamilaroi musician and researcher, was appointed as the 2024/25 First Nations Artist in Residence.

In November 2024, the AAO celebrated its 30th anniversary with a concert at Melbourne Recital Centre. The program featured works spanning three decades including Paul Grabowsky's Ringing The Bell Backwards (1994), Peter Knight's The Plains, and new premieres by Choulai and Associate Artist Sofia Carbonara. The concert brought together musicians from across the AAO's history, including past Artistic Directors Grabowsky and Knight, along with special guests Kutcha Edwards and Hikaru Tanaka.

Later in November 2024, the AAO undertook a tour to Japan, performing three nights at Shinjuku Pit Inn in Tokyo. The tour featured performances with Bumpy, Kojoe, and Hikaru Tanaka, reflecting Choulai's deep connections to both Australian and Japanese musical communities.

== Notable performances and projects ==
=== 1997 ===
- Methodist Ladies College Music Auditorium, Melbourne

=== 1998 ===
- Adelaide Festival of the Arts, Adelaide

=== 1999 ===
- Melbourne Town Hall, Melbourne, Performance of Passion

=== 2001 ===
- Sydney Festival, Sydney Opera House, Performance of Passion

=== 2004 Kura Tungar—Songs from the River ===
- Kura Tungar—Songs from the River was a performance created in collaboration with Archie Roach and Ruby Hunter in 2004, after two years' work. A documentary film of the preparation, including interviews, artistic photography of the River Murray, and parts of the performance, directed by Philippa Bateman called Wash My Soul in the Rivers Flow, was released in 2021.

=== 2005 ===
- Festival de Mexico Centro Historico, Mexico, Performance of Passion

=== 2007 ===
- Castlemaine State Festival, Performance of Passion

=== 2008 ===
- Artshouse, North Melbourne Town Hall, Performance of Passion

=== 2009 ===
- In March the AAO performed Ringing the Bell Backwards at Elisabeth Murdoch Hall, Melbourne Recital Centre to correspond with the release of a remastered recording of this piece
- In April the AAO performed Passion at Elisabeth Murdoch Hall, Melbourne Recital Centre, Melbourne
- In August the AAO performed Ruby's Story at the Civic Centre, Wagga Wagga, NSW
- Also in August the AAO and the Young Wagilak Group performed Crossing Roper Bar at Elisabeth Murdoch Hall, Melbourne Recital Centre
- On September 22 the AAO and the Young Wagilak Group performed Crossing Roper Bar at the APRA Classical Music Awards as winners of the 2009 Outstanding Contribution to Australian Music in a Regional Area Award at the Playhouse Theatre, Sydney
- In October the AAO and The Sruthi Laya Ensemble featuring Karaaikkudi Mani performed Into The Fire on a tour of Australia, which played at two major concerts, in Melbourne at the Recital Centre followed by special VIP functions at both the Melbourne Recital Centre and the National Gallery of Victoria; and in Brisbane, Griffith University Recital Hall. This was followed by a five-day residency at Griffith University in Queensland, marking the release of The Chennai Sessions CD
- Also in October the AAO and special guests Marc Hannaford and Ken Eadie performed Scott Tinkler's Folk at Wangaratta Jazz Festival, Wangaratta Performing Arts Centre

=== 2013 ===
- Peter Knight Appointed Artistic Director - Composer/trumpeter/sound artist Peter Knight became Artistic Director of the Australian Art Orchestra, succeeding founding director Paul Grabowsky who had led the ensemble for nearly 20 years. Knight was also awarded the Australia Council Music Fellowship for 2013/14 and was named Griffith University's 2013 Alumnus of the Year
- The Australian Art Orchestra & Sruthi Laya Ensemble won the 2013 AMC/APRA Art Music Award for Performance of the Year
- Brett Thompson, guitarist and composer, was appointed as the AAO's Young Artist in Residence for 2013/14
- At the 2013 Melbourne Festival, Mexican artist Pedro Reyes worked with the Australian Art Orchestra to transform weapons into musical instruments as part of an artwork that unites people together through music

=== 2014 ===
- Toronto Soundstreams. Performance of Passion, and world premiere performance of new work by Nicole Lizée (Montreal) commissioned by Soundstreams
- Hong Kong Academy of Performing Arts performances of Crossing Roper Bar
- Melbourne Recital Centre. World premiere of new work by Brett Thompson, Atlas, Herbal and Ritual commissioned by AAO
- Malthouse Theatre 20Up 20th Anniversary Concert featuring works from AAO 20-year history plus world premiere of new work by Austin Buckett, Virtuoso Pause, commissioned by AAO. Live broadcast ABC Classic FM

=== 2015 ===
- MONA FOMA (Tasmania) Performances of Crossing Roper Bar
- Jazzahead Bremen (Germany). Market showcase of Crossing Roper Bar
- Chengdu China. Creative development and concerts for Water Pushes Sand
- OzAsia Festival. Water Pushes Sand world premiere
- Melbourne Festival performances and album recording Water Pushes Sand
- Wangaratta Jazz Festival with Dave Douglas and Monash Art Ensemble

=== 2016 ===
- Sydney Festival, Exit Ceremonies new works for pipe organ and mixed ensemble with Ensemble Offspring featuring new work by Austin Buckett commissioned by AAO
- Melbourne Town Hall Exit Ceremonies featuring new work by Alvin Lucier commissioned by AAO
- Metropolis New Music Festival opening concert featuring Nicole Lizée including new works from Lizée and Peter Knight commissioned by AAO

=== 2017 ===
- Water Pushes Sand, Darwin Festival
- Diomira by Peter Knight, Melbourne Festival
- OzAsia Meeting Points, including works by Keiichiro Shibuya (Japan), Mindy Meng Wang (China/Australia), Daniel Wilfred (Arnhem Land) and Bael Il Dong (Korea).
- Sydney Festival, Sex, Lynch, and Video Games. The screen works of Nicole Lizée (Canada), featuring Nicole Lizée

=== 2018 ===
- London Jazz Festival presenting world premiere of 'Sometimes Home Can Grow Stranger than Space' at Southbank Centre featuring works by Peter KNight, Andrea Keller, and Tilman Robinson
- Jazztopad Wroclaw Poland presenting work of Peter Knight and Andrea Keller including world premiere of 'The Plains'
- Melbourne International Jazz Festival presenting world premiere performance of 'Vesper' by Kim Myhr

=== 2019 ===
- 25th Anniversary Solo Series - To mark its 25th anniversary, the AAO launched a year-long Solo Series featuring monthly video releases spotlighting twelve musicians from the AAO's pool of collaborators, including Aviva Endean (clarinet), Sunny Kim (vocals), Daniel Wilfred (voice), Martin Ng (turntables), Mindy Meng Wang (guzheng), and Peter Knight (trumpet and electronics). The series captured solo improvisations in high resolution video and was accompanied by photographic portraits and written responses
- Pathfinders Program - The AAO launched its Pathfinders Music Leadership program, appointing Aviva Endean as the orchestra's inaugural Associate Artist
- Water Pushes Sand China Tour - In October, the AAO toured China with Water Pushes Sand, performing in Chengdu, Shanghai Arts Festival, Xi'an's Shaan Xi Grand Theatre, and other venues across China
- JazzFest Berlin - On November 1, the AAO headlined JazzFest Berlin at Haus der Berliner Festspiele, performing compositions by Peter Knight ("The Sharp Folds" and "The Plains") and a new commission by Berlin-based Australian guitarist Julia Reidy
- Anthony Braxton's Sonic Genome - On October 31, the AAO participated in the opening night of JazzFest Berlin at Gropius Bau, joining 60 musicians from Australia, Germany, UK and US in Anthony Braxton's immersive six-hour durational performance Sonic Genome, only the third performance worldwide of this large-scale work

=== 2020 ===
- Karappo Okesutura Volume III - The AAO developed Nicole Lizée's Karappo Okesutura Volume III during a creative residency at the Banff Centre for Arts and Creativity in Canada. The work, which explores glitching karaoke performances of Australian and Canadian pop hits from the 1980s and 90s, premiered at Soundstreams in Toronto
- During the COVID-19 pandemic, the AAO released several recordings including Vesper (featuring Norwegian guitarist Kim Myhr), Umi No Uzu (featuring Aaron Choulai), and the album Sometimes Home Can Grow Stranger Than Space
- The AAO continued its Meeting Points Series at Arts Centre Melbourne with performances including Hand to Earth featuring Daniel and David Wilfred with Sunny Kim and Peter Knight
- Mini Masterclass Series and Pathways - In response to COVID-19 lockdowns, the AAO offered mentoring through its Mini Masterclass series and Pathways program, continuing its commitment to music education and artist development

=== 2021 ===
- First Nations Artist Residency Program - The AAO launched the First Nations Artist Residency Program in partnership with the Melbourne International Jazz Festival (MIJF) and Songlines Aboriginal Music Corporation to support the career development of First Nations musicians. Amos Roach, an award-winning musician, dancer, director and proud Djab Wurrung/Gunditj Mara and Ngarrindjeri man, was appointed as the inaugural First Nations Artist in Residence
- The AAO released three significant albums: Closed Beginnings (featuring Tariro Mavondo, Reuben Lewis and Peter Knight), Crossed and Recrossed (featuring Peter Knight's works "The Plains" and "Diomira"), and Hand to Earth (self-titled album)
- Closed Beginnings, developed over a three-year period, won the 2021 APRA/AMCOS Art Music Award for electroacoustic/sound art 'Work of the Year' and was nominated for a 2021 ARIA for Jazz Album of the Year

=== 2022 ===
- The Australian Art Orchestra was acknowledged with a National Luminary AMC/APRA Art Music Award for an Organisation for sustained leadership and contribution
- Hand to Earth was nominated for a 2022 ARIA for World Album of the Year
- Fresh Water Salt Water - The AAO premiered Fresh Water Salt Water as part of the UK Australia Season, with the world premiere at Melbourne Recital Centre followed by the UK premiere at Huddersfield Contemporary Music Festival
- Bungul - Hand to Earth performed Bungul with Ingar Zach and Judith Hamann at Pierre Boulez Saal in Berlin
- Alvin Lucier: Swing Bridge - Mode Records released Swing Bridge by Alvin Lucier, featuring works commissioned and directed by Peter Knight for the AAO
- Brenda Gifford, a classically trained pianist and saxophonist and Yuin woman, was appointed as the 2022 recipient of the First Nations Artist Residency Program

=== 2023 ===
- Aaron Choulai Appointed Artistic Director - Peter Knight concluded his tenure as Artistic Director of the Australian Art Orchestra, a position he held from 2013-2023. Aaron Choulai succeeded Knight as Artistic Director, bringing his expertise in jazz, hip-hop and improvised music, and his extensive connections to the Asia-Pacific music scene
- Raw Denshi - Aaron Choulai reprised his critically acclaimed 2020 work Raw Denshi for his Australian Art Orchestra debut, reimagining the work for the AAO with Japanese hip-hop pioneers Kojoe and Hikaru Tanaka. The work premiered at The Substation in Melbourne as part of the Melbourne International Jazz Festival, followed by performances at MONA
- Bumpy, a Noongar singer-songwriter, was appointed as the 2023/24 recipient of the First Nations Artist Residency Program

=== 2024 ===
- 30th Anniversary Concert - On November 15, the AAO celebrated its 30th anniversary with a special concert at Melbourne Recital Centre, featuring both past Artistic Directors Paul Grabowsky and Peter Knight alongside current Artistic Director Aaron Choulai. The program included reimagined works spanning three decades: Ringing The Bell Backwards (the AAO's first major work from 1994, composed by Paul Grabowsky), The Plains (composed by Peter Knight), and world premieres by Aaron Choulai and Associate Artist Sofia Carbonara. Special guests included Kutcha Edwards and Hikaru Tanaka
- Japan Tour - The AAO toured Japan as part of its 30th anniversary celebrations, performing three nights at Shinjuku Pit Inn in Tokyo with special guests including Bumpy, Kojoe, and Hikaru Tanaka
- Adam Manning, a Kamilaroi musician and researcher, was appointed as the 2024/25 recipient of the First Nations Artist Residency Program

== Discography ==
=== Albums ===
List of albums, with selected details
Title	Details
Ringing the Bell Backwards	Released: 1996; Format: CD; Label: ORIGiN (OR008)
Passion (with Paul Grabowsky)	Released: 1999; Format: CD; Label: ABC Classics (465 230-2)
Into the Fire (with Sruthi Laya Ensemble)	Released: 2000; Format: CD; Label: ABC Classics (465 705-2)
Ruby (with Archie Roach, Ruby Hunter & Paul Grabowsky )	Released: 2005; Format: CD; Label: Australian Art Orchestra
The Chennai Sessions (Into The Fire) (with Guru Kaaraikkudi Mani)	Released: 2009; Format: CD; Label: Australian Art Orchestra
Crossing Roper Bar	Released: 2010; Format: CD, Digital; Label: Australian Art Orchestra (AAO 9324690038060)
Crossing Roper Bar, Vol. 2: The Ghost Dances	Released: 2014; Format: CD, Digital; Label: Australian Art Orchestra (AAO 9324690104055)
Water Pushes Sand	Released: August 2017; Format: CD, Digital; Label: Jazzhead (HEAD234)
Vespa (with Kim Myhr)	Released: 2020; Format: CD, Digital; Label: Hubro (HUBROCD2630)
Closed Beginnings (with Reuben Lewis, Tariro Mavondo & Peter Knight)	Released: June 2021; Format: CD, Digital; Label: Australian Art Orchestra (AAO 007)
Crossed & Recrossed (with Peter Knight)	Released: September 2021; Format: CD, Digital; Label: Hospital Hill (HHLP03210750)
Hand to Earth (with Peter Knight)	Released: October 2021; Format: CD, Digital; Label: Australian Art Orchestra (AAO 008)

== Awards and nominations ==
=== Australian Music Centre ===
Year	Nominee / work	Award	Result	Ref.
2013	Australian Art Orchestra	AMC/APRA Art Music Award Performance of the Year	Won	
2014	Australian Art Orchestra	AMC/APRA Art Music Award for Excellence by an Organisation	Won	
2016	Australian Art Orchestra	Art Music Award nomination for Excellence in Music Education	Nominated	
2016	Australian Art Orchestra	Excellence in Music Education	Nominated	
2017	Australian Art Orchestra	Instrumental Work of the Year	Nominated	
2022	Australian Art Orchestra	AMC/APRA Art Music Award: Luminary Award for an Organisation	Won	

=== ARIA Music Awards ===
The ARIA Music Awards is an annual awards ceremony that recognises excellence, innovation, and achievement across all genres of Australian music. They commenced in 1987.

Year	Nominee / work	Award	Result	Ref.
1995	Ringing the Ball Backwards	Best Jazz Album	Nominated	
2000	Into the Fire (with Sruthi Laya Ensemble)	Best Jazz Album	Nominated	
2017	Water Pushes Sand	Best Jazz Album	Nominated	
2021	Closed Beginnings (with Reuben Lewis, Tariro Mavondo & Peter Knight)	Best Jazz Album	Nominated	
2022	Hand to Earth (with Daniel Wilfred, Sunny Kim, Peter Knight & Aviva Endean)	Best World Music Album	Nominated	

=== Australian Jazz Bell Award ===
Year	Nominee / work	Award	Result	Ref.
2003	Australian Art Orchestra	Jazz Ensemble of the Year	Won	
2011	Australian Art Orchestra	Jazz Ensemble of the Year	Won	

=== Classical Music Awards ===
Year	Nominee / work	Award	Result	Ref.
2009	Australian Art Orchestra	Outstanding Contribution to Australian Music in a Regional Area	awarded	

=== Helpmann Awards ===
Year	Nominee / work	Award	Result	Ref.
2005	Australian Art Orchestra	Helpmann Award	Won	

=== Sidney Myer Performing Arts Awards ===
Year	Nominee / work	Award	Result	Ref.
2010	Australian Art Orchestra	Group Award	Won	

== See also ==
- List of experimental big bands
