= Jamu Dreaming =

Studio album by Archie Roach
- Released: March 1993
- Recorded: 1992
- Studio: Metropolis Studios, Melbourne, Australia
- Length: 47:56
- Label: Aurora, Mushroom Records
- Producer: David Bridie

Archie Roach chronology
Charcoal Lane (1990)	Jamu Dreaming (1993)	Looking for Butter Boy (1997)

Singles from Charcoal lane
- 1. "From Paradise" Released: February 1993; 2. "Walking into Doors" Released: October 1993

Jamu Dreaming is the second studio album by Australian singer song writer Archie Roach. The album was released in March 1993 and peaked at number 55 on the ARIA Charts. The album was recorded with musical assistance from David Bridie, Tiddas, Paul Kelly, Vika and Linda Bull, Ruby Hunter, Dave Arden and Joe Geia.

Jamu is the Pitjanjatjara word for grandfather or old one (p. 242, Roach's autobiography, 2019).

At the ARIA Music Awards of 1994, the album was nominated for Best Indigenous Release.

== Reception ==
Professional ratings
Review scores
Source	Rating
AllMusic	3/5 stars

Bob Townsend from No Depression said the album is "a more hopeful celebration of his ancestry and search for justice" than his debut. David Gulliver commented on the material range from songs of domestic violence, the wonder that comes from being a father and simple domestic happiness. Gulliver said "Musically, Jamu Dreaming relies on simple beauty, not catchy choruses. Archie is no great tunesmith, so he relies on the power of his voice and his lyrics to keep the listener captivated. His voice is most impressive on the slower songs, where he can let his voice breathe in the simple piano arrangement." adding "Archie's lyrics are unashamedly from the heart, and in his homilies to family life, it is his sheer honesty that prevents the listener from cringing."

== Track listing ==
No.	Title	Writer(s)	Length
1.	"Weeping in the Forest"	Archie Roach	4:52
2.	"From Paradise"	Roach	4:20
3.	"Mr. T"	Roach	4:34
4.	"Love in the Morning"	Roach	4:21
5.	"Tell Me Why"	Roach	3:25
6.	"Walking into Doors"	Roach	4:49
7.	"Wild Blue Gums"	Roach	4:42
8.	"So Young"	Dave Arden	3:11
9.	"Angela"	Roach	4:05
10.	"Jamu Dreaming"	Roach, Bridie, John Phillips	4:19
11.	"There Is a Garden"	Roach	5:18

== Charts ==
Chart (1993)	Peak position
Australian Albums (ARIA)	55

== Release history ==
Country	Date	Format	Label	Catalogue
Australia	March 1993	Compact Disc; Cassette	Aurora, Mushroom Records	D30851
