= Into the Bloodstream =

Studio album by Archie Roach
- Released: 19 October 2012
- Length: 58:13
- Label: Liberation Records
- Producer: Craig Pilkington

Archie Roach chronology
1988 (2009)	Into the Bloodstream (2012)	Creation (2013)

Singles from Into the Bloodstream
- 1. "Song to Sing" Released: July 2012; 2. "We Won't Cry" Released: 8 October 2012

Into the Bloodstream is the sixth studio album by Australian singer-songwriter Archie Roach. The album was released on 19 October 2012 and peaked at number 49 on the ARIA Charts in December 2012.

The album deals with Roach losing his life partner Ruby Hunter in February 2010, and his own health issues including having a stroke, being diagnosed with cancer and having half a lung removed. In the liner notes, Roach says the album is "built on pain." Roach says "Pain can also bring about change in one's life for the better, we can choose to ignore the Pain until it becomes unbearable or we can do something. I used to think that letting go of the pain was the only way of getting better but that may not be necessarily so. You see some events in my life I will never ever truly get over and the pain will always be there, but I can do something about it." Upon release Roach added "The songs I think are uplifting, about getting on with life. Music has played a big part in getting better. It's a little different from what people have been used to from me but the songs have been really well-received."

At the ARIA Music Awards of 2013, the album was nominated for Best Blues and Roots Album.

At the Deadly Awards 2013, the album won Album Release of the Year.

== Reception ==
Into the Bloodstream was met with critical acclaim and was described as "an inspirational comeback" by Mess & Noise, "a triumphant return" by ABC online and "amongst his best work" by The AU Review. Michael Dwyer from Sydney Morning Herald described the album as having songs "from bereavement and illness to reaffirmation of belonging and creativity."

Deadly Magazine said "Each track on the album is a mix of expressing pain, and standing strong." and "As always, Archie's lyrics take us to where he wants us to go – to the voice of his people, the land and the spirit and the ever-present struggle of Indigenous people in this country." adding "A major theme of the album is the support that Archie offers to anyone experiencing pain and loss."

== Track listing ==
No.	Title	Writer(s)	Length
1.	"Into the Bloodstream"	Archie Roach	4:51
2.	"Song to Sing"	Roach	5:46
3.	"Big Black Train"	Roach	4:28
4.	"Heal the People"	Roach	4:26
5.	"Mulyawongk"	Roach	5:44
6.	"We Won't Cry" (featuring Paul Kelly)		3:37
7.	"Wash My Soul in the River's Flow"	Roach	5:25
8.	"I'm on Your Side"	Roach	3:31
9.	"Little by Little"	Roach	6:00
10.	"Hush Now Babies" (featuring Emma Donovan)	Roach	5:48
11.	"Top of the Hill"	Roach	4:04
12.	"Old Mission Road"	Roach	4:33

== Charts ==
Chart (2012)	Peak position
Australian Albums (ARIA)	49

== Release history ==
Country	Date	Format	Label	Catalogue
Australia	19 October 2012	Compact Disc; digital download	Liberation Records	LMCD0214
