= Journey (Archie Roach album) =

Studio album by Archie Roach
- Released: 29 October 2007
- Studio: Sing Sing Studios; Melbourne, Australia
- Length: 44:06
- Label: Liberation Records
- Producer: Nash Chambers, Shane Howard

Archie Roach chronology
Ruby (2005)	Journey (2007)	1988 (2009)

Singles from Journey

Journey is the fifth studio album by Australian singer songwriter Archie Roach. The album was the first studio album released by Roach on the Liberation Records label and was released in October 2007.

Journey was released as a companion piece to a documentary film called Liyarn Ngarn, made with Patrick Dodson and Pete Postlethwaite.

At the ARIA Music Awards of 2008, the album was nominated for ARIA Award for Best World Music Album.

== Reception ==
Dave Clarke from Readings said "This record is intrinsically linked to a film called Liyarn Ngarn, a project he, British actor Pete Postlethwaite and Aboriginal leader and elder Patrick Dodson worked on. There is a mournfulness to these songs; I think it is probably as close to the Negro-Spiritual music of the African-American people that we're going to get in Australia. Songs of repression, repossession and hope for a better life. Archie Roach has a beautiful rich voice but the thing that strikes me most when I listen to this is the pain in his voice. The voice of a man who has suffered much but continues his search for justice. And for peace."

== Track listing ==
No.	Title	Writer(s)	Length
1.	"Little Sisters (Special Place)"	Archie Roach	4:09
2.	"Travellin' Bones" (featuring Troy Cassar-Daley)	Roach	3:32
3.	"Old People Singing"	Roach	5:59
4.	"John Pat" (featuring Paul Kelly)	Jack Davis	3:10
5.	"Liyarn Ngarn"	Roach	4:36
6.	"Never Blood"	Kevin Gilbert	2:26
7.	"Too Many Bridges"	Roach	3:03
8.	"Lighthouse (Song for Two Mothers)"	Roach	6:32
9.	"Spirit of Place"	Roach	4:57
10.	"Your Old Ones"	Roach	5:30

== Charts ==
Chart performance for Journey
Chart (2007)	Peak position
Australian Albums (ARIA)	193

== Release history ==
Country	Date	Format	Label	Catalogue
Australia	29 October 2007	Compact Disc; digital download	Liberation Records	LIBCD9259.2
