= The Concert Collection 2012–2018 =

Live album by Archie Roach
- Released: 17 May 2019
- Recorded: November 2012 – May 2018
- Venue: The Arts Centre, State Theatre, Melbourne Recital Centre
- Label: Bloodlines

Archie Roach chronology
Dancing with My Spirit (2018)	The Concert Collection 2012–2018 (2019)	Tell Me Why (2019)

The Concert Collection 2012–2018 is a three-disc live album by Australian singer-songwriter Archie Roach. The album features live recordings from Roach's three most recent studio albums. The album was released in May 2019.

In July 2019, Roach was nominated for two awards at the 2019 National Indigenous Music Awards; including Album of the Year.

== Background ==
Disc 1 combines live recordings from The Arts Centre in Melbourne in November 2012, and from the State Theatre in Sydney in January 2013 from the Into the Bloodstream tour.

Disc 2 was the Let Love Rule concert in Melbourne Recital Centre in October 2016 and featured the voices of both the Dhungala Children's Choir and Short Black Opera.

Disc 3 was recorded at Hamer Hall at Arts Centre in Melbourne on 6 May 2018, with Tiddas for the Dancing with My Spirit concert.

== Reception ==
Jeff Jenkins from Stack called it "a deeply moving collection" and called out Roach's resonant tone as "the star of the show". Jenkins also called for Roach to be inducted into the ARIA Hall of Fame.

Angustus Welby from Beat Magazine called the release "a celebration of his three-decade legacy".

== Track listing ==
CD1 Into the Bloodstream
No.	Title	Writer(s)	Length
1.	"Sunrise/Into the Bloodstream"	Archie Roach	6:38
2.	"Hush Now Babies" (featuring Emma Donovan)	Roach	6:22
3.	"Old Mission Road"	Roach	4:46
4.	"Big Black Train"	Roach	5:51
5.	"Little by Little"	Roach	6:05
6.	"Dancing Shoes" (featuring Dan Sultan)		4:00
7.	"Heal the People"		4:30
8.	"I'm on Your Side" (featuring Vika and Linda)	Roach	4:30
9.	"Mulyawongk"	Roach	5:57
10.	"We Won't Cry" (featuring Paul Kelly)		4:33
11.	"Wash My Soul in the River's Flow"	Roach	5:29
12.	"Top of the Hill"	Roach	4:05
13.	"Song to Sing"	Roach	6:27
14.	"We Won't Cry" (featuring Jack Charles)		3:58

CD2 Let Love Rule
No.	Title	Writer(s)	Length
1.	"Intro"	Archie Roach	0:30
2.	"Let Love Rule" (featuring Jessica Hitchcock)	Archie Roach	5:13
3.	"Get Back to the Land" (intro)	Roach	2:05
4.	"Get Back to the Land"	Roach	4:12
5.	"There's a Little Child" (intro)	Roach	0.58
6.	"There's a Little Child"	Roach	4:08
7.	"Please Don't Give Up On Me" (intro)	Roach	1:31
8.	"Please Don't Give Up On Me"	Roach, Craig Pilkington	3:24
9.	"Love Sweet Love" (intro)	Roach	1:03
10.	"Love Sweet Love" (featuring Emma Donovan)	Roach	5:05
11.	"Spiritual Love" (intro)	Roach	1:08
12.	"Spiritual Love"	Roach	3:34
13.	"Always Be Here" (intro)	Roach	1:04
14.	"Always Be Here"	Roach, Pilkington	4:39
15.	"It's Not Too Late" (intro)	Roach	3:02
16.	"It's Not Too Late"	Roach, Pilkington	3:58
17.	"Mighty Clarence River" (intro)	Roach, Pilkington	2:15
18.	"Mighty Clarence River"	Roach, Pilkington	3:40
19.	"No More Bleeding" (intro)	Roach	1:13
20.	"No More Bleeding"	Roach	4:31

CD3 Dancing with My Spirit
No.	Title	Writer(s)	Length
1.	"Dancing with My Spirit" (featuring Tiddas)	Roach	5:10
2.	"My Grandmother" (featuring Tiddas)	Roach	4:45
3.	"The River Song" (featuring Tiddas)	Roach	6:12
4.	"A Child Was Born Here" (featuring Tiddas)	Archie Roach	5:36
5.	"Morning Star" (featuring Amy Saunders)	Roach	7:14
6.	"F-Troop"	Roach	5:27
7.	"Louis St John"		6:21
8.	"Ever Watching" (featuring Tiddas)		4:06
9.	"Heal the People" (featuring Tiddas)		5:08
10.	"Come into My Kitchen"		4:22
11.	"Anthem"		3:15
12.	"Wild Mountain Thyme" (featuring Tiddas)	Robert Tannahill, Robert Archibald Smith	4:42
13.	"Dancing Shoes" (featuring Tiddas)	Roach	4:57

== Charts ==
Chart (2019)	Peak position
Australian Physical Albums (ARIA)	42

== Release history ==
Country	Date	Format	Label	Catalogue
Australia	17 May 2019	3×CD; digital download; streaming	Bloodline	BLOOD54
