= Down City Streets =

- LP cover

Single by Archie Roach

from the album Charcoal Lane
- B-side: "Muntana, No No No"
- Released: 1991
- Recorded: April 1990
- Studio: Curtain Street Studios, Melbourne
- Length: 4:05
- Label: Aurora, Mushroom Records
- Songwriter(s): Ruby Hunter
- Producer(s): Paul Kelly, Steve Connolly

Archie Roach singles chronology
| "Took the Children Away" (1990) | "Down City Streets" (1991) | "From Paradise" (1993) |

"Down City Streets" is a song written by Australian singer songwriter Ruby Hunter and recorded by her husband Archie Roach. The song was released in 1991 as the second single from Roach's debut studio album Charcoal Lane (1990).

"Down City Streets" is an autobiographical song Hunter wrote recalling her time as a homeless alcoholic. She gave the song to her husband Roach to record for his debut studio album. In 2015 Roach recalls the scenario coming home one night "... she was there and she screwed up this paper and tried to hide it under the pillow or something like that and I said, 'What is that?' She said, 'Ah, nothing'. I said, 'Can I have a look at it?' She reluctantly gave me this piece of paper with a song written on it ... and she just sat down and sang it to me."

At the ARIA Music Awards of 1992, the song was nominated for Best Indigenous Release.

The song was re-recorded by Roach and Hunter on the album Ruby in 2005.

== Track listing ==
single
| No. | Title | Length |
|---|---|---|
| 1. | "Down City Streets" | 4:05 |
| 2. | "Muntana" (live at Triple J) | 7:36 |
| 3. | "No No No" (live at Triple J) | 3:50 |

== Release history ==
| Region | Date | Format | Edition(s) | Label | Catalogue |
|---|---|---|---|---|---|
| Australia | 1991 | CD single; Vinyl | Standard | Aurora, Mushroom Records | K10360 |
