= Hold On Tight (Archie Roach song) =

Single by Archie Roach

from the album Looking for Butter Boy
- Released: June 1997
- Studio: Hanley House, Port Fairy
- Length: 4:27
- Label: Mushroom Records
- Songwriter(s): Archie Roach, Mark Seymour

Archie Roach singles chronology
"Walking into Doors" (1993)	"Hold On Tight" (1997)	"Watching Over Me" (1997)

"Hold On Tight" is a song written by Australian singer Archie Roach. The song was released in June 1997 as the lead single from Roach's third studio Looking for Butter Boy. Upon release, Roach said "'Hold on Tight' is about holding on a bit tighter and loving someone a little bit more. It's based on a song about two people who went through that problem and now they're holding on tight to each other."

At the ARIA Music Awards of 1997, the song won Best Indigenous Release.

== Track listing ==
CD single
No.	Title	Length
1.	"Hold On Tight"
2.	"Weeping in the Forest" (live)
3.	"Intro"
4.	"From Paradise" (live)
5.	"A Child Was Born Here"

== Release history ==
Region	Date	Format	Edition(s)	Label	Catalogue
Australia	June 1997	CD single	Standard	Mushroom Records	mush016202
