= Charcoal Lane =

Studio album by Archie Roach
- Released: May 1990
- Recorded: April 1990
- Studio: Curtain Street Studios; Melbourne, Australia.
- Length: 43:39
- Label: Aurora, Mushroom Records
- Producer: Paul Kelly, Steve Connolly

Archie Roach chronology
Charcoal Lane (1990)	Jamu Dreaming (1993)

Singles from Charcoal lane
- 1. "Took the Children Away" Released: September 1990; 2. "Down City Streets" Released: 1991

Alternative cover
- 25th Anniversary Edition (2015 release)

Charcoal Lane is the debut studio album by Australian singer song writer Archie Roach, released in 1990.

== Name ==
From the 1960s through to the 1980s, the inner-city Melbourne suburb of Fitzroy was a meeting place for Aboriginal people who had left missions, Aboriginal reserves, and other government institutions and drifted to the city in a bid to trace their families, and Roach was one of these. A street behind a factory was a meeting and drinking place known to the community as Charcoal Lane.

In 2009 the old Aboriginal Health Service building at 136 Gertrude Street was converted into a social enterprise restaurant, which was called Charcoal Lane at the request of the local Koori community, and provided training for Aboriginal and Torres Strait Islander young people. It closed its doors in August 2021, during the COVID-19 pandemic, with the building being returned to the Victorian Aboriginal Health Service.

== Other musicians ==
Vika and Linda Bull were backing vocalists on the album. Tim Finn provided backing vocals on "Took the Children Away".

== Reception, ratings, awards ==
Professional ratings
Review scores
Source	Rating
AllMusic	4.5/5 stars

The album was released in May 1990 and peaked at number 86 on the ARIA Charts in April 1991. At the ARIA Music Awards of 1991, the album received three nominations, winning two; ARIA Award for Best New Talent and Best Indigenous Release.

Rolling Stone said "In the best singer-songwriter tradition, Charcoal Lane is deeply moving in both personal and political terms".

The album was certified gold in 1992.

== 25th anniversary edition ==
A 25th Anniversary Edition of the album was released in November 2015; including the original disc plus new interpretations by Australian artists and five live recordings from 1990.

== Track listing ==
No.	Title	Writer(s)	Length
1.	"Native Born"	Archie Roach	4:00
2.	"Charcoal Lane"	Roach	3:21
3.	"Munjana"	Roach	7:36
4.	"I've Lied"	Roach	3:17
5.	"Down City Streets"	Ruby Hunter	4:04
6.	"Took the Children Away"	Roach	5:24
7.	"Sister Brother"	Roach	4:27
8.	"Beautiful Child"	Roach	4:01
9.	"No No No"	Roach	3:49
10.	"Summer of My Life"	Roach	3:34

25th Anniversary Edition (2015)
No.	Title	Writer(s)	Length
1.	"Charcoal Lane" (performed by Paul Kelly and Courtney Barnett)	Roach	4:00
2.	"Munjana" (performed by Dan Sultan and Emma Donovan)	Roach	7:33
3.	"I've Lied" (performed by Marlon Williams and Leah Flanagan)	Roach	3:15
4.	"Beautiful Child" (performed by Ellie Lovegrove and Nancy Bates)	Roach	5:12
5.	"Down City Streets" (performed by Emma Donovan & The PutBacks featuring Archie Roach)	Hunter	4:21
6.	"No No No" (performed by Radical Son and Urthboy and Trials)	Roach	4:06
7.	"The Children Came Back" (performed by Briggs and Gurrumul and Dewayne Everettsmith)	Roach	3:40
8.	"Charcoal Lane" (performed by Archie Roach and Ruby Hunter [Live at the Wireless, 1990])	Roach	3:44
9.	"Down City Streets" (performed by Archie Roach and Ruby Hunter [Live at the Wireless, 1990])	Hunter	5:19
10.	"Native Born" (performed by Archie Roach and Ruby Hunter [Live at the Wireless, 1990])	Roach	5:13
11.	"Sister Brother" (performed by Archie Roach and Ruby Hunter [Live at the Wireless, 1990])	Roach	5:55
12.	"Took The Children Away" (performed by Archie Roach and Ruby Hunter [Live at the Wireless, 1990])	Roach	5:57

== Charts ==
Chart (1990–92)	Peak position
Australia (ARIA)	86

== Certifications ==
Region	Certification	Certified units/sales
Australia (ARIA)	Gold	35,000^{^}
^{^} Shipments figures based on certification alone.

== Release history ==
Country	Date	Format	Label	Catalogue
Australia	May 1990	Vinyl Record; Compact Disc; Cassette	Aurora, Mushroom Records	D30386
United States of America	1992	Compact Disc; Cassette	Hightone Records	HCD 8037
Australia	6 July 2004	Compact Disc; Digital Download	Mushroom Records	MUSH320132
Australia	6 November 2015	Vinyl Record; Compact Disc; Digital Download	Festival Records	FEST601039
