= Took the Children Away =

- LP cover

Single by Archie Roach

from the album Charcoal Lane
- B-side: "No No No"
- Released: September 1990
- Recorded: April 1990
- Studio: Curtain Street Studios, Melbourne
- Length: 5:24
- Label: Aurora, Mushroom Records
- Songwriter: Archie Roach
- Producers: Paul Kelly, Steve Connolly

Archie Roach singles chronology
"Took the Children Away" (1990)	"Down City Streets" (1991)

"Took the Children Away" is a song written and recorded by Australian singer Archie Roach. The song was released in September 1990 as his debut single. The song was included on Roach's debut studio album Charcoal Lane.

At the ARIA Music Awards of 1991, the song was nominated for Breakthrough Artist – Single.

In 1991, "Took the Children Away" won Roach the Human Rights Achievement Award, the first time that the award had been bestowed on a songwriter.

In 2013, the song was added to the Sounds of Australia registry in the National Film and Sound Archive.

== Background and release ==
Roach was a part of the Stolen Generations, generations subject to a policy that ran from about 1905 until the 1970s where Indigenous Australian children were forcibly removed from their family by Australian government agencies, and placed in orphanages. Roach wrote "Took the Children Away" about this experience in 1988. He performed the track on a community radio station in Melbourne and on an Indigenous current affairs program. Australian musician Paul Kelly invited Roach to open his concert early in 1989, where he performed "Took the Children Away". His performance was met with stunned silence, followed by shattering applause. The song became significant as it was released at a time when there was increasing public focus on the Stolen Generations.

== Track listing ==
single
No.	Title	Length
1.	"Took the Children Away"	5:24
2.	"No No No"	3:49

== Charts ==
Chart performance for "Took the Children Away"
Chart (1990)	Peak position
Australia (ARIA)	160

== Release history ==
Region	Date	Format	Edition(s)	Label	Catalogue
Australia	September 1990	CD single; Vinyl	Standard	Aurora, Mushroom Records	K10157
