= Ruby Hunter =

Australian Aboriginal singer-songwriter (1955–2010)

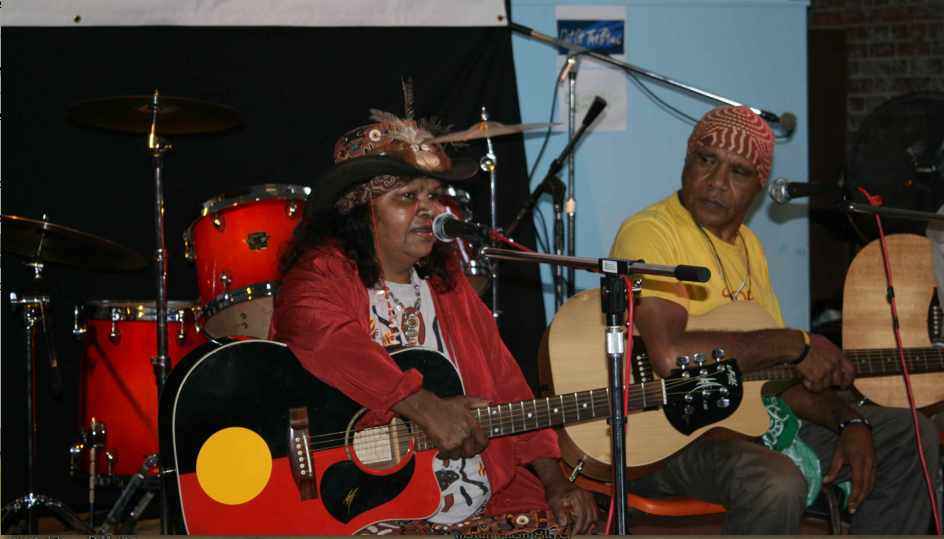
- Ruby Hunter (left) with partner Archie Roach at the 2009 Tamworth Country Music Festival

Background information
- Also known as: Aunty Ruby
- Born: 31 October 1955; Renmark, South Australia
- Died: 17 February 2010 (aged 54)
- Genres: Folk, blues, roots
- Instruments: Vocals, guitar

Ruby Charlotte Margaret Hunter (31 October 1955 – 17 February 2010), also known as Aunty Ruby, was an Aboriginal Australian singer, songwriter and guitarist, and the wife and musical partner of Archie Roach.

== Early life ==
Ruby Hunter was born on 31 October 1955 on Goat Island, near Renmark in South Australia. Her parents had come to the Riverland to find work after the Swan Reach mission had closed in 1946, and at the time, Aboriginal women were not allowed access to the local hospital to give birth. Hunter was a Ngarrindjeri, Kokatha, and Pitjantjatjara woman.

As a child Hunter lived with her brothers, Wally, Jeffrey and Robert, and sister Iris, with their grandmother and grandfather at the Aboriginal reserve at Point McLeay (later called Raukkan) on Lake Alexandrina in the Coorong region of South Australia. One day, when Ruby was eight years old, Wally was taken off the street by government officials, and then the men took the rest of the children from their home, under the pretext that they were being taken to the circus. Thereafter Ruby lived in institutions and foster care, as one of the Stolen Generations. Hunter was placed in Seaforth Children's Home in the Adelaide seaside suburb of Somerton Park, and later with a foster family. After having an argument with her foster brother, she was placed at Vaughan House, which was a 'home for wayward girls' in the northern Adelaide suburb of Enfield.

Hunter met her partner for life, Archie Roach, at the age of 16, while both were homeless teenagers, at the Salvation Army People's Palace, on Pirie Street, Adelaide. It was Roach who inspired Hunter to learn to play the guitar and write her own music.

== Performing career ==
Hunter first performed in public in 1988 during a festival at Bondi Pavilion in Sydney, where she performed "Proud, Proud Woman," the first song she had written. In 1990, she wrote the autobiographical "Down City Streets", which was performed by Roach on his debut solo album Charcoal Lane. In 1994, Hunter became the first Indigenous Australian woman to record a solo rock album, and the first Aboriginal woman signed to a major record label, when she released her debut album Thoughts Within. The album launched her career as a performer and songwriter.

Thereafter, she toured with Roach, both within Australian and overseas, releasing her second album Feeling Good in May 2000. Also in that year, Hunter appeared in a feature-length documentary film, Land of the Little Kings, which told the stories of Indigenous children affected by being forcibly removed from their families. The name of the film derives from a song by Paul Kelly, which is sung by Roach in the film. In the film, Hunter returns to her childhood home for the first time, and relates the story of her childhood. The film won a Human Rights Award in the television category in 2000.

In 2001 Hunter made her acting debut in the award-winning feature fiction film One Night the Moon, directed by Rachel Perkins and starring Paul Kelly.

With Roach, Paul Grabowsky and his Australian Art Orchestra (AAO), she wrote and performed the concert Ruby's Story, which tells her life story through song and spoken word. The production debuted at the Message Sticks Festival at the Sydney Opera House in June 2004, to good reviews. In 2004, the soundtrack won the Deadly Award for Excellence in Film & Theatrical Score, and the show went on to tour nationally and internationally until 2009. The soundtrack was released as an album on CD and as a digital download in 2005.

In October 2004 a new concert, once again a collaboration with Roach, Grabowsky and the AAO, entitled Kura Tungar – Songs from the River, premiered at the Melbourne International Arts Festival, which was directed by Robyn Archer that year. The concert, which was directed by Patrick Nolan, told stories from the two performers' lives, and featured songs about the Murray River and Ngarrindjeri Country, Ruby's home. The music used Roach and Hunter's lyrics and chords combined with Grabowsky and the AAO's contemporary jazz orchestration. It played to full houses which gave standing ovations and was later performed at the Sydney Opera House and Adelaide Festival Centre. In 2005 Kura Tungar won the Helpmann Award for the Best Contemporary Australian Concert at the 5th Helpmann Awards.

In 2005, Hunter was invited by Deborah Conway to take part in the Broad Festival project, with three other Australian female artists, where they performed their own and each other's songs. With Hunter and Conway were Sara Storer, Katie Noonan and Clare Bowditch.

== Personal life ==
Hunter and Roach had a close and lifelong bond from the moment of their meeting, sharing a deep love that nourished both of them. They had two sons and officially fostered three children. They also mentored teenagers in the family home; unofficially, Roach estimated around 15 to 20 further children over the years.

Hunter said that her proudest achievement was keeping her family together as a stable unit.

== Death and legacy ==
Hunter died of a heart attack on 17 February 2010, aged 54. Her partner Archie Roach established Ruby's Foundation to help continue her legacy. The foundation is dedicated to creating opportunities for Aboriginal people through the promotion, celebration and support of Aboriginal arts and culture.

At the 2020 National Indigenous Music Awards, Hunter was inducted into its Hall of Fame.

Wash My Soul in the River's Flow (2021), written and directed by Philippa Bateman and produced by Bateman, Kate Hodges and Archie Roach, is a feature-length documentary based on the 2004 concert Kura Tungar-Songs from the River, featuring Roach, Hunter, Paul Grabowsky and the Australian Art Orchestra, in which Hunter and Roach sing about the Murray River and Ngarrindjeri lands. The film also tells of the love story between Hunter and Roach, and is interspersed with vision of The Coorong. Hunter is featured wearing pelican feathers, with Roach explaining that she was a pelican in the Dreamtime and that her spirit has returned to being a pelican. The film had its world premiere at the Brisbane International Film Festival in October 2021 and was an official selection for the Sydney Film Festival and the Melbourne International Film Festival in December 2021.

In 2022, two side-by-side pillar-shaped monuments were erected on the shores of Lake Bonney at Barmera, in homage to Hunter and Roach. Glass mosaic artwork on the front side of each monument, designed by Hunter's sister-in-law, Rosslyn Richards, depict Hunter's Ngarrindjeri totem, the pelican (nori) and Roach's totem, the eagle.

In 2023, the Roach- and Hunter-authored book Songs from the Kitchen Table was released, including lyrics, stories, photographs.

In 2024, a statue of Hunter and Roach was erected at Atherton Gardens in Fitzroy.

A process to have Hunter's birthplace, Goat Island, named after her, was begun in 2021, but as of March 2026 had still not been decided. In February 2025 a consultation process was undertaken by the Department for Housing and Urban Development, but no decision had been made by March 2026. Ruby Hunter Foundation chair Cheryl Norris, diagnosed with a terminal illness in early 2026, expressed a wish to get it done while Ruby's brothers Wally (Eric Richards) and Jeff Hunter were still alive.

Hunter continues to be known affectionately as Aunty Ruby.

== Discography ==
=== Albums ===
Title	Album details
Thoughts Within	Released: 1994; Format: CD; Label: Mushroom (MUSH32309.2)
Feeling Good	Released: May 2000; Format: CD; Label: Mushroom (MUSH332672)
Ruby (with Archie Roach, Australian Art Orchestra & Paul Grabowsky)	Released: 2005; Format: CD, Digital download; Label: Australian Art Orchestra (AAO16)
Songs from the Kitchen Table (with Archie Roach)	Released: 31 May 2024; Format: digital download; Label: Archie Roach Foundation

== Filmography ==
- Evil Angels (1988) as Judy Roberts
- Correlli (TV miniseries, 1995)
- The Land of Little Kings (2000)
- One Night the Moon (2001) as Albert's wife
- Wash My Soul in the River's Flow (2021)

== Publications ==
- "A Change is Gonna Come", poem (1995), published in the journal Republica
- Co-author (illustrator), with Roach, Took the Children Away (2010), a children's book created from the song; 30th anniversary edition shortlisted in 2021 Australian Book Industry Awards, Australian Book of the Year for Younger Children
- Co-author, with Roach, Butcher paper, texta, black board and chalk (2012), a children's song-book which features Aboriginal songs about land, health and life. Many of the songs were written through songwriting and music workshops held by Hunter and Roach with children across Cape York in Queensland.

== Awards and nominations ==
=== ARIA Music Awards ===
The ARIA Music Awards is an annual awards ceremony that recognises excellence, innovation, and achievement across all genres of Australian music.

Year	Nominee / work	Award	Result
1995	Thoughts Within	Best Indigenous Release	Nominated
2000	Feeling Good	Best Blues & Roots Album	Nominated

=== Australian Women in Music Awards ===
The Australian Women in Music Awards is an annual event that honours women for their contributions to the Australian music industry. They were first awarded in 2018.

Year	Nominee / work	Award	Result	Ref.
2025	Ruby Hunter	Lifetime Achievement Award	awardee	

=== The Deadly Awards ===
The Deadly Awards, commonly known simply as The Deadlys, was an annual celebration of Australian Aboriginal and Torres Strait Islander achievement in music, sport, entertainment and community. They ran from 1995 to 2013.

Year	Nominee / work	Award	Result
2000	Hunter	Female Artist of the Year	Won
2003	Hunter and Roach	Outstanding Contribution to Aboriginal and Torres Strait Islander Music	awarded
2004	Ruby's Story (with Roach and Paul Grabowsky )	Excellence in Film & Theatrical Score	Won

=== Helpmann Awards ===
The Helpmann Awards is an awards show, celebrating live entertainment and performing arts in Australia, presented by industry group Live Performance Australia (LPA) since 2001.

Year	Nominee / work	Award	Result
2005	Kura Tungar: Songs from the River (with Archie Roach)	Best Australian Contemporary Concert	Won

=== National Indigenous Music Awards ===
The National Indigenous Music Awards recognise excellence, innovation and leadership among Aboriginal and Torres Strait Islander musicians from throughout Australia. They commenced in 2004.

Year	Nominee / work	Award	Result
2020	herself	Hall of Fame	inductee

=== Sidney Myer Performing Arts Awards ===
The Sidney Myer Performing Arts Awards commenced in 1984 and recognise outstanding achievements in dance, drama, comedy, music, opera, circus and puppetry.

Year	Nominee / work	Award	Result
2009	Ruby Hunter (with Archie Roach)	Individual Award	awarded
