= Show Us Ya Tiddas =

Live album by Tiddas
- Released: 1999
- Recorded: Continental Café, Prahran, Victoria, September, 1999.
- Length: 41:00
- Label: Festival Records

Tiddas chronology
Lethal By the Kilo (1998)	Show Us Ya Tiddas (1999)

Tiddas is the first and only live album by Australian three-piece folk group Tiddas. It is also the group's final recording with the group disbanding shortly after its release in May 2000. The album was recorded live at the Continental Café in Prahran, over two nights in September 1999. The album was released in late 1999.

== Reception ==
Deadly Magazine said "The album is a celebration of a decade of making music, defying trends and forging friendships all around the world." adding "The album features 11 new tracks filled with classic Tiddas passions: peace, families, politics, women's issues and most important of all, love.. [and this is] their best work yet."

== Track listing ==
No.	Title	Writer(s)	Length
1.	"Old Hat Creek"		3:01
2.	"Makin' Believe"	Jimmy Work	3:14
3.	"Little Girl"		2:57
4.	"Pour the Sea"		3:01
5.	"Aunty"		2:54
6.	"Inanay"	Bennett	1:57
7.	"Stop All Your Fighting"		2:59
8.	"Earth Lately"		3:01
9.	"Valda's Caravan"		2:57
10.	"Sorry Song"		3:00
11.	"Spirit of the Winter Tree"	Bennett, Kym Walker	3:33
12.	"Rainbow"		3:21
13.	"Old Mountain Thyme"	Robert Tannahill, Robert Archibald Smith	5:05

== See also ==
- Show Us Your Tiddas!, a 2007 play written and performed by Lou Bennett and directed by Rachael Maza that follows Bennetts life, telling stories such as her coming out to her family, her first live performance, moving to the city and her time with Tiddas.
