= Show Us Your Tiddas! =

Play written and performed by Lou Bennett

Show Us Your Tiddas! is a play written and performed by Lou Bennett and directed by Rachael Maza in 2007.

Show Us Your Tiddas! shares its name with the last album by Bennett's band Tiddas, spelt Show Us Ya Tiddas. It is an autobiographical work that follows Bennetts life, telling stories such as her coming out to her family, her first live performance, moving to the city and her time with Tiddas.

Bennett's performance is backed by members of her current band Sweet Cheeks.
