= Tiddas (album) =

Studio album by Tiddas
- Released: August 1996
- Producer: Joe Camilleri

Tiddas chronology
Sing About Life (1993)	Tiddas (1996)	Lethal By the Kilo (1998)

Singles from Tiddas
- 1. "Ignorance is Bliss" Released: July 1996; 2. "Walk Alone" Released: 1997

Tiddas is the second studio album by Australian three-piece folk group Tiddas. The album was released in August 1996 and peaked at number 36 on the ARIA Charts.

At the ARIA Music Awards of 1997, the album was nominated for Best Indigenous Release.

== Track listing ==
No.	Title	Writer(s)	Length
1.	"Walk Alone"		3:00
2.	"Mission Song"		3:51
3.	"Ignorance Is Bliss"	Lou Bennett, Sally Dastey	2:56
4.	"No Goon No Pah"		1:38
5.	"You and Me Running"		3:19
6.	"Musqueam"		4:06
7.	"Pebble On the Beach"		3:14
8.	"Hold Her Close"		3:14
9.	"Anthem"		3:21
10.	"Burdens to Bear"		3:23
11.	"Waving Goodbye"		4:16
12.	"Lullaby"		3:03

== Charts ==
Chart (1996)	Peak position
Australian Albums (ARIA)	26

== Release history ==
Region	Date	Format(s)	Label	Catalogue
Australia	5 August 1996	Compact Disc	Black Pig/ Polygram	5327992
