= Djaambi =

Australian urban rock band

- Origin: Melbourne, Victoria, Australia
- Genre: Rock
- Years active: 1989–1995
- Past members: Richard Frankland; Amy Saunders; Sally Dastey; Lou Bennett; Peter Rotumah

Djaambi were an Australian urban rock band formed in 1989 by Richard Frankland (ex-Interaction) on lead vocals and saxophone, with both Aboriginal and white members. Initially a ten-piece, they had a variable line-up and sometimes had 15 performers. The word, djaambi, is "brother" in an Aboriginal language. The group released a self-titled album in 1990 and supported Prince on his Australian Tour in 1992.

Djaambi were the subject of a documentary, Beating About the Bush (Titus Films, 1993), which followed their travels from Alice Springs, through Aboriginal communities, to Darwin. It was co-produced and co-directed by Nicholas Adler and Caroline Sherwood. According to The Canberra Times staff reporters, "It was obvious that most of the band members, particularly the more vocal Aboriginal ones, did not want the film crew there. It was a wonder they allowed the crew in the first place, considering the distrust of them... Franklin was virtually the only person who was happy with the filming." Frankland, who was also a film maker, had the group provide music for three of his films.

Former members of Djaambi include Peter Rotumah on bass guitar (ex-Hard Times), who was later in the Black Arm Band. Three female vocalists, Amy Saunders (Frankland's sister), Sally Dastey and Lou Bennett, left in 1991 to form a folk band, Tiddas. Other band members included Peter Pascotto (drums), Peter Camm (guitar), Dean Hilson (sax), Eugene Ball (trumpet), Allyson Walker (vocals), Julia Messenger (vocals), Sonny Cooper (didge, dancer) and Paul Wright (didge, dancer), Francis Cleary (audio & production) . Bennett later recalled her time with Djaambi, "the band could range from 10 to 15, depending on who was in the audience with a didgeridoo, or who could dance." Bennett, Dastey and Saunders were also members of the Black Arm Band. During 1995 to 1996 Frankland recorded his debut solo album, Down Three Waterholes Road (September 1997).
