= Dolly Dalrymple =

Tasmanian Aboriginal woman

- Born: c. 1808; Furneaux Islands, Bass Strait
- Died: 1 December 1864; Latrobe, Tasmania
- Burial place: Sherwood Hall, Latrobe
- Spouse: Thomas Johnson (m. 1831)
- Children: 12
- Parents: George Briggs (father); Woretemoeteyenner (mother)

Dolly Dalrymple (c. 1808–1864) was a Tasmanian Aboriginal woman. She was a known figure in the Tasmanian colonial legends.

== Biography ==
Dolly Dalrymple was born on one of the Furneaux Islands, between Victoria and Tasmania, to Woretemoeteyenner (also known as Pung or Margaret), daughter of the chief Mannarlargenna from Van Diemen's Land, and George Briggs from Bedfordshire, England. Her mother was either kidnapped by or paid to live with Briggs, who later sold her on to another sealer for a guinea. Dolly Dalrymple became the foster child of the surgeon Jacob Mountgarrett (1773–1828), of Port Dalrymple, who had her baptised with the surname Dalrymple and educated her in Western domestic chores.

From 1825, she lived with the convict Thomas Johnson (1801–1867), with whom she had several children and married six years later, in October 1831. Earlier in the same year she had successfully defended her hut and children against an attack by Aboriginals while Johnson was away. She was rewarded by the government with 20 acres (8.1 ha) of land at Perth, where she moved with Johnson and her children.

In 1841 she was assisted by the government to bring her mother Woretemoeteyenner, then residing at Wybalenna, on Flinders Island, to live with her at Perth on the mainland of Tasmania. By this time, Dalrymple had seven children.

The entire family moved to the Mersey region in 1845. Thomas Johnson eventually became wealthy and purchased 500 acres (200 ha) in the modern locality of Latrobe where he founded Sherwood Hall beside the Mersey and Railton Road. Dolly Dalrymple often managed his estates during his absence.
