= George Briggs (sealer) =

English convict

George Briggs (fl. 1816), an English convict in Van Diemen's Land, was a sealer in Bass Strait known for having children with at least one Aboriginal woman, Woretemoeteyenner, apparently with the consent of her father, the chief Lamanbunganah.

== Background ==
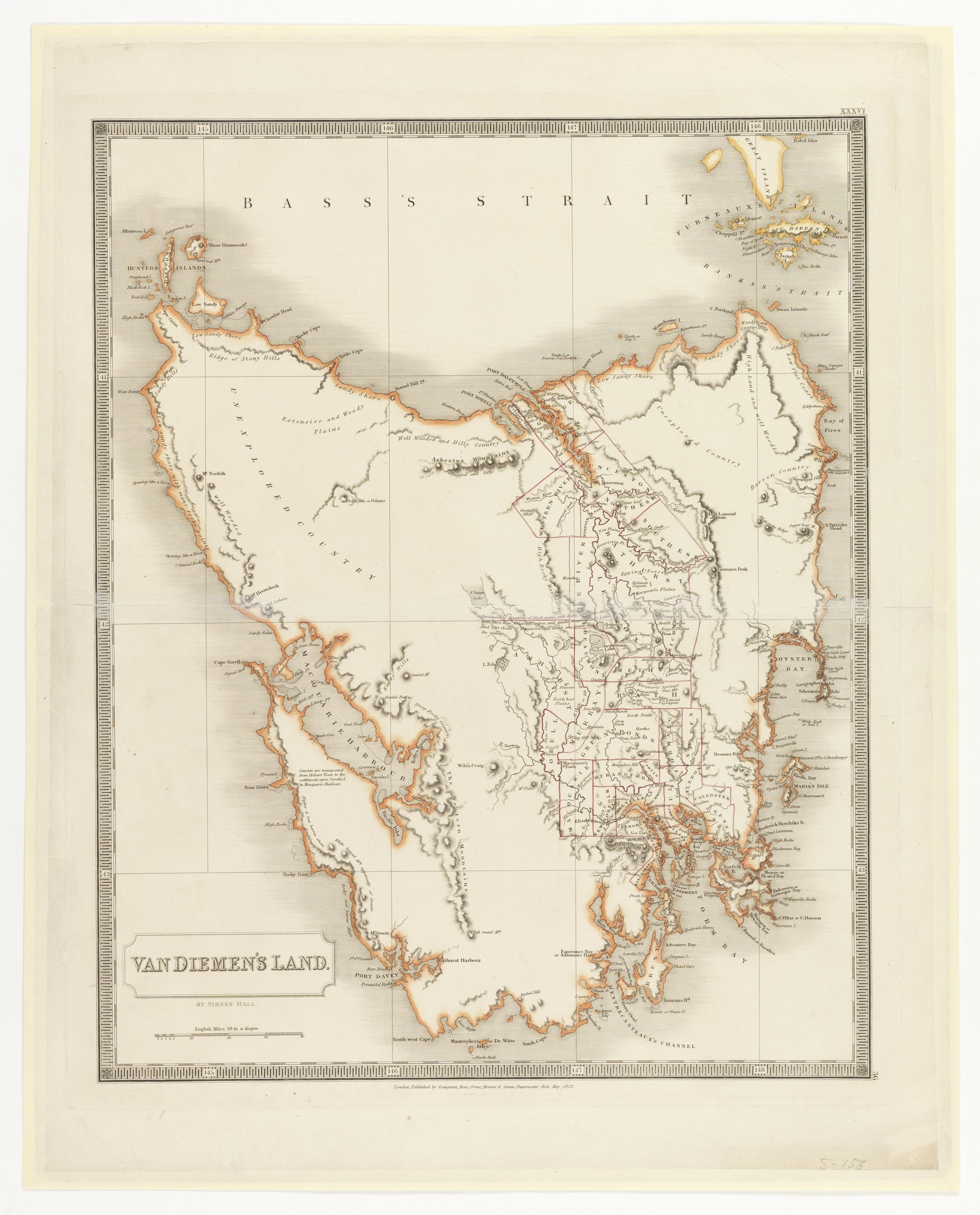
Map of Van Diemen's Land, 1828

James Kelly, the circumnavigator of Tasmania, was connected with sealing. He wrote an account of the voyage some time after 1821, in which he says: "The custom of the sealers in the straits was that every man should have from two to five of these native women for their own use and benefit, and to select any of them they thought proper to cohabit with as their wives; and a large number of children had been born in consequence of these unions—a fine active hardy race. The males were good boatmen, kangaroo hunters, and sealers; the women extraordinarily clever assistants to them. They were generally very good looking, and of a light copper colour."

== Life ==
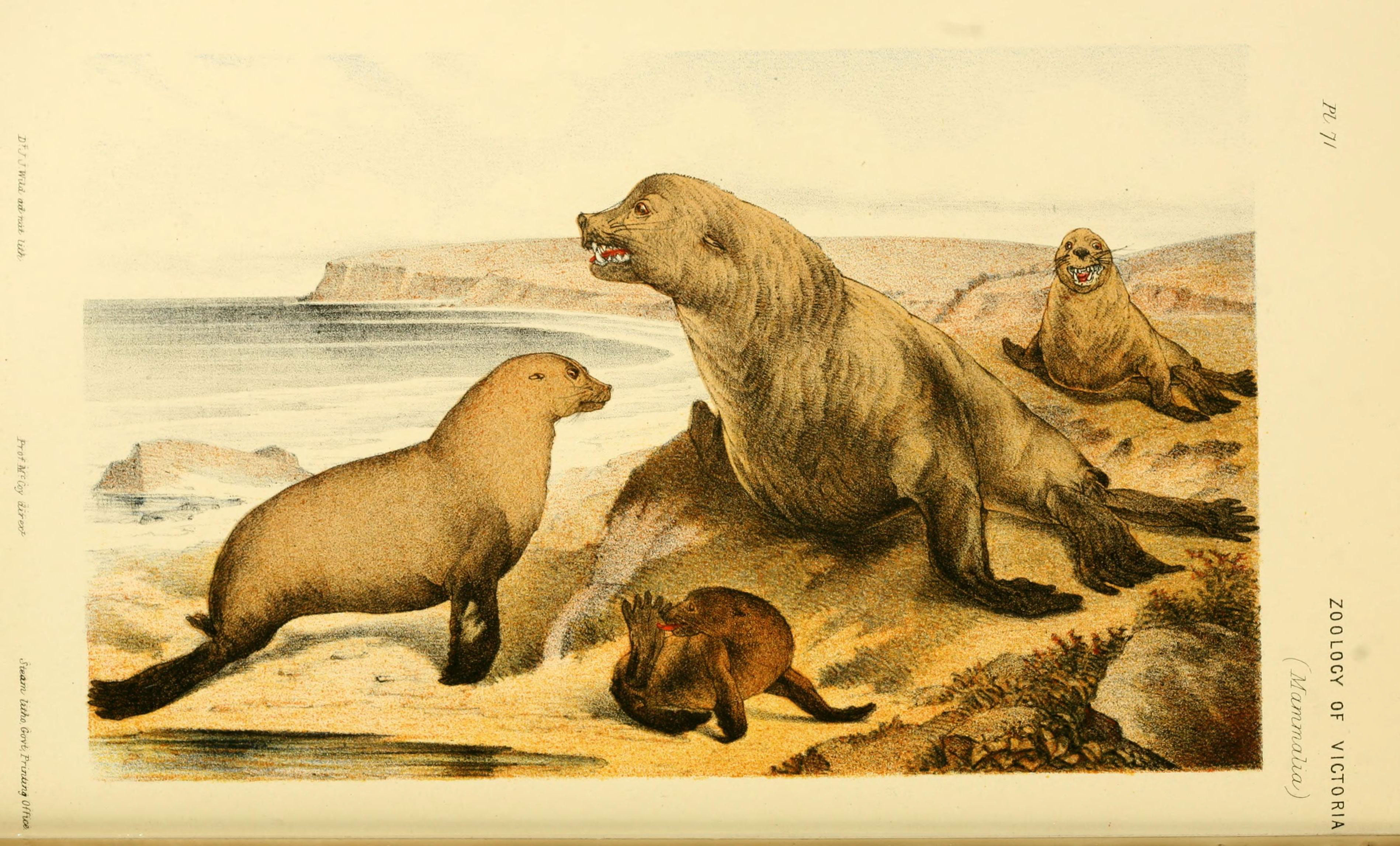
Depiction of brown fur seals, 1883

In the course of his narrative, Kelly frequently refers to a sealer of the name of George Briggs, originally from Bedfordshire, England. George Briggs was one of Kelly's shipmen during the circumnavigation. Kelly states that Briggs could speak the language of the North-East Coast tribes fluently. He was an able man, who in 1816 had two native women, one a daughter of the chief Lamanbunganah, and five mixed race children.

One of Briggs's native concubines has been identified as Woretemoeteyenner (c. 1797–1847), also called Watamutina, Pung, and Bung, a daughter of the North-East chieftain Mannarlargenna who arranged for his daughter to cohabit with Briggs. She bore Briggs five known children, including an infant girl (killed near Launceston in 1811; Aborigines threw the baby into a campfire), and Dolly Dalrymple.

== John Briggs ==
Brough Smyth gives an account of a half-caste Tasmanian called John Briggs, as follows: "John Briggs, a half-caste Tasmanian, who intermarried with a half-caste Australian, has had ten children, of whom eight are now living—three boys and five girls. John Briggs was born in one of the islands in Bass's Straits. His wife is the daughter of an Australian woman, who, with her sister, was taken to Tasmania at the time that Buckley was removed from Port Phillip to that colony. His eldest son is between seventeen and eighteen years of age, and the youngest child is two months old. He says he was married in 1844. He is an intelligent man; tall and well-formed, but weather-beaten in appearance. His hair is grey; his complexion yellow—dull yellow; his teeth large, and not close together; his hair woolly, somewhat like that of a negro; his eyes dark-brown; his nose arched and almost Roman; his forehead well- shaped—not harsh and bony, but curved, and the lines are good: the frontal sinuses are not prominent. He is the only half-caste Bass's Straits man I have ever had the opportunity of closely examining. He is very different from the half-caste Australian, and is also unlike the half-caste negro."

== See also ==
- Dolly Dalrymple
- James Munro (sealer)

== Sources ==
- Brodie, Nick (28 June 2021). "Forced Entry: The Battle for Aboriginal Land". Forty South, 79. Online ed. Retrieved 20 August 2022.
- McFarlane, Ian (October 2002). "Aboriginal Society in North West Tasmania: Dispossession and Genocide". [Thesis]. The University of Tasmania. pp. 55–56, 65.
- McFarlane, Ian (2005). "Dalrymple, Dolly (1808–1864)". Australian Dictionary of Biography. Supplemental Volume. The Australian National University. Retrieved 20 August 2022.
- Plomley, Brian; Henley, Kristen Anne (1990). "The Sealers of Bass Strait and the Cape Barren Island Community". Tasmanian Historical Research Association Papers and Proceedings, 37(2&3). p. 74.
- Pretyman, E. R. (1967). "Kelly, James (1791–1859)". Australian Dictionary of Biography. Volume 2. The Australian National University. Retrieved 20 August 2022.
- Walter, Maggie (2006). "Woretemoeteyenner". Alexander, Alison (ed.). The Companion to Tasmanian History. Centre for Tasmanian Historical Studies. University of Tasmania. Retrieved 20 August 2022.

Attribution:
