= Lethal by the Kilo =

Lethal By the Kilo

Studio album by Tiddas
- Released: September 1998
- Recorded: ABC studios, Melbourne, 1998

Tiddas chronology
Tiddas (1996)	Lethal By the Kilo (1998)	Show Us Ya Tiddas (1999)

Lethal By the Kilo is the third and final studio album by Australian three-piece folk group Tiddas. The album was released in September 1998 and supported the released with a national tour. The album was nominated for Album of the Year at the Deadly Awards 1999. The group recorded a live album in 1999 and disbanded in May 2000.

Lou Bennett wrote the song "Waka Nini Yana" which in the Yorta Yorta language means "Where Are you Going?. She wrote the song after hearing her great grandmother Pricilla McCrae speaking Yorta Yorta.

== Track listing ==
No.	Title	Writer(s)	Length
1.	"Little Things"
2.	"Waka Nini Yana"	Lou Bennett
3.	"For a Short Time"
4.	"Seven Years"
5.	"And There are Secrets"
6.	"Cry Wolf"
7.	"Think Positive"
8.	"If You Live a Lie"
9.	"Father's Calmness"
10.	"Create Another Day"
11.	"Still Goes On"
12.	"Body Shape"

== Chart ==
Weekly chart performance for Lethal by the Kilo
Chart (1998)	Peak position
Australian Albums (ARIA)	192

== Release history ==
Region	Date	Format(s)	Label	Catalogue
Australia	September 1998	Compact Disc	Mercury Records	5382772
Australia	1 October 2005	Compact Disc	Mercury Records	5382772
