= Bob Maza =

Australian actor, playwright, director and activist

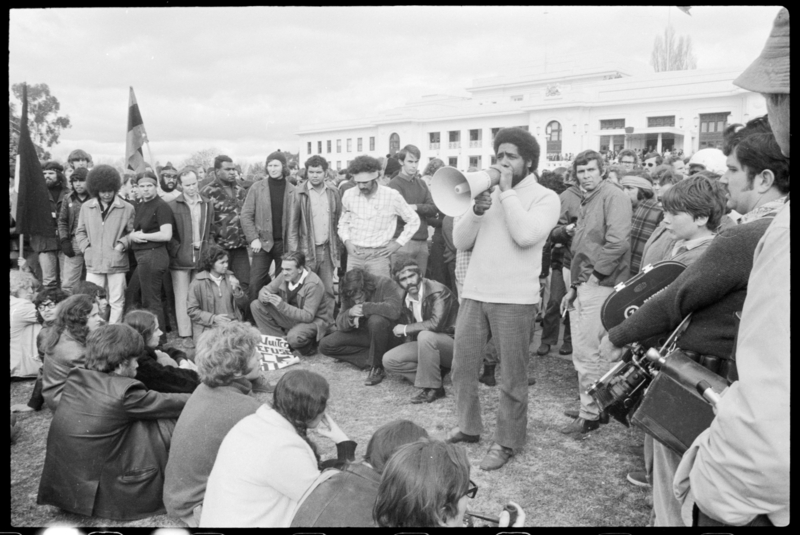
- Maza addressing a protest at the Aboriginal Tent Embassy in July 1972
- Born: Robert Lewis Maza; 25 November 1939; Palm Island, Queensland, Australia
- Died: 14 May 2000 (aged 60); Sydney, New South Wales, Australia
- Occupations: Actor, playwright

Robert Lewis Maza AM (25 November 1939 – 14 May 2000), known as Bob Maza, was an Indigenous Australian actor, playwright and activist.

== Early life and education ==
Robert Lewis Maza was born on Palm Island in North Queensland on 25 November 1939, to a Murray Islander (Torres Strait Islander) father and to a Yidindji (Australian Aboriginal) mother.

He was one of the first Aboriginal children in northern Queensland to complete secondary schooling, and described feelings of alienation and being caught between two cultures as a teenager. After finishing school in Cairns, he worked as a labourer and then did office work in Darwin, Northern Territory.

== Activism ==
After moving to Melbourne in the late 1960s, he joined the Aborigines Advancement League (AAL) and started becoming involved in Indigenous rights activism. He was inspired by Malcolm X Speaks, and subsequently made president of the AAL.

In 1970 Maza attended the third Pan-African Conference in the United States, where he witnessed the effectiveness of Indigenous theatre. Also in 1970, he addressed the United Nations General Assembly on the subject of "the third-world status of Indigenous Australians".

In 1972, he took part in the Aboriginal Tent Embassy protest.

== Acting career ==
=== Television ===
After moving to Melbourne in the 1960s, Maza became a musician and actor, featuring in various television dramas, becoming particularly known for his role as the articled clerk Gerry Walters in the ABC series Bellbird. He also appeared in many other television series, including Hunter, Homicide, Harry's War, Wildside, A Difficult Woman, A Country Practice, Women of the Sun and Heartland.

=== Theatre ===
In 1971 Maza started working in theatre with Jack Charles, and together they formed Nindethana, putting on a humorous piece called Jack Charles Is Up and Fighting, subtitled "It‟s tough for us Boongs in Australia today". In mid-1972 helped to establish the National Black Theatre in Sydney (with Brian Syron and Justine Saunders), and played a role in their first production, Basically Black.

After the National Black Theatre lost its funding, Maza helped to found the Black Theatre Arts and Culture Centre in Redfern, and was its first artistic director when it opened in July 1974. In January 1975, he directed his first play, Robert J. Merritt's The Cake Man, which was the first play by an Indigenous playwright to be published, televised, and tour internationally. He later directed Roger Bennett's Up the Ladder (1989), Jack Davis' No Sugar (1994) and Owen Love's No Shame (1995).

Appearing on stage for Nimrod Theatre, he acted in Eric Bentley's Are You Now, or Have You Ever Been? (1976), Thomas Keneally's Bullie's House (1980) and Michael Frayn's Clouds (1980).

=== Films ===
He also acted in films, including When the Stars Came Dreaming (1998), Lilian's Story (1996), The Back of Beyond (1995), The Nostradamus Kid (1993), Reckless Kelly (1993), Ground Zero (1987), The Fringe Dwellers (1986), BabaKiueria (1986), White Man's Legend (1984), and 27A (1974).

== Literary career ==
Maza's most notable play was The Keepers (1989). Mereki (first performed 8 October 1984), Tiddalik the Frog, and The Rainbow Serpent (1992) were based on traditional pre-colonial stories (see Rainbow Serpent and Tiddalik), with the intention of helping to regenerate Aboriginal culture.

The Keepers, based on the true story of a Scottish settler family meeting the last few members of the Buandig (Boandik) people of Rivoli Bay in South Australia during the frontier wars, was performed at the Adelaide Fringe Festival, by the Troupe Theatre, directed by Geoff Crowhurst, and at Belvoir Street Theatre in 1988, starring Lillian Crombie and Danny Adcock, and directed by Maza.

It was the first play produced by the Aboriginal National Theatre Trust, and Maza won the National Black Playwright Award for the production.

== Other activities ==
Maza lectured in Indigenous Studies at Tranby Aboriginal College in the Sydney suburb of Glebe and was Assistant Director of Studies there.

He was the first Indigenous commissioner of the Australian Film Commission from 1995 to 1998, during which time he helped to create its Indigenous Unit.

== Recognition ==
In 1981 Maza was an official delegate to the World Indigenous Festival in Canada

He won the National Black Playwright Award for The Keepers (1989).

In 1993, he was made a Member of the Order of Australia for services to the arts and to Indigenous people.

In 1998 Maza won the Red Ochre Award, which has been awarded by the Australia Council for the Arts since 1993 to an outstanding Aboriginal or Torres Strait Islander artist for lifetime achievement.

== Death and legacy ==
Maza died on 14 May 2000 in Sydney, from cardiac arrest.

=== Awards in his name ===
At the Tudawali Awards in 2002, the Indigenous Unit of the Australian Film Commission (AFC) awarded the Bob Maza Memorial Award, to recognise emerging acting talent and support professional development. This was awarded to Ursula Yovich

==== Bob Maza Fellowship ====
The Bob Maza Fellowship was created by the AFC (and from mid-July 2008 awarded by its superseding body, Screen Australia), "to an established Indigenous actor to further their professional development, provide longevity in their career and raise their profile internationally", and the A$10,000 (2008) awarded by the AFC had to be used on travel to attend further training at an international film training institution, meetings with agents, and/or establishing contacts in the international arena.

Winners of the Bob Maza Fellowship include:

- 2005: Ursula Lovich & Tom E. Lewis
- 2006: Leah Purcell
- 2007: Aaron Pedersen
- 2008: Luke Carroll, presented at the Message Sticks Indigenous Film Festival at the Sydney Opera House
- 2011: Wayne Blair
- 2013: Tony Briggs

==== Uncle Bob Maza Memorial Award ====
The Uncle Bob Maza Memorial Award for Outstanding Contribution to Victorian Indigenous Theatre has been awarded at the Victorian Indigenous Performing Arts (VIPA) Awards for some years. Recipients include:

- 2003: Rachael Maza
- 2005: Warren Owens
- 2014: Noel Tovey
- ? (twice): Pauline Whyman

== Personal life ==
He married Dutch immigrant to Australia, Vera Blankman, and the couple are parents to actor and director Rachael Maza and writer and actor Lisa Maza.
