= Miriam Corowa =

Australian journalist

- Born: Miriam Corowa; 7 February 1975 (age 50); Adelaide, South Australia, Australia
- Citizenship: Australia
- Occupations: Journalist; television presenter; producer; director
- Employer: Australian Broadcasting Corporation

Miriam Corowa (born 7 February 1975) is an Australian journalist, presenter, producer, and director.

Corowa is primarily known for her roles with the Australian Broadcasting Corporation (ABC) and the Special Broadcasting Service (SBS); she was the host of Message Stick from 2008 to 2010, and has been a newsreader for ABC News since 2012.

Corowa is the current weekend presenter of ABC News at Noon.

== Early life ==
Corowa was born in Adelaide. Her mother, who has Indigenous Australian heritage, worked for land councils and the Department of Aboriginal Affairs. She is a member of the Minyangbal and Bundjalung people who also has South Sea Islander heritage; Corowa's great grandfather arrived in Australia from Vanuatu in the 1890s. Her father was a British immigrant to Australia who worked at the State Theatre Company of South Australia.

At six months old, Corowa moved with her mother and her older sister Tina to Lismore in northeastern New South Wales. She was the only Aboriginal child in her preschool. Corowa went on to complete work experience at ABC 2NR and graduate from Lismore High School.

== Career ==
Corowa studied history, philosophy, and politics at the Australian National University and the University of Sydney, graduating in 1998. She began her career as a production assistant for Indigenous Current Affairs Magazine (the predecessor show to Living Black) on SBS. She later moved into the newsroom at SBS World News, where she wrote weekend weather reports for veteran presenter Lee Lin Chin, and after completing a cadetship in 2003, became a TV reporter herself.

In May 2006, Corowa joined the ABC as a producer for Message Stick, a TV series focused on Indigenous Australian culture and current events. She replaced former senator Aden Ridgeway as the host of the program between 2008 and 2010. In her time at Message Stick, Corowa also directed and/or wrote long-form documentary segments about Terri Janke, the Aboriginal and Torres Strait Islander Commission, Paul Fleming, and Bangarra Dance Theatre.

Corowa joined the ABC News team in 2012, as a co-host of ABC News Weekend Breakfast alongside Andrew Geoghegan. She remained a newsreader on the ABC throughout the 2010s, most recently as the weekend presenter of ABC News at Noon, and has hosted the ABC's commemorative programs of national events such as Anzac Day and Australia Day.
