= Harry's War =

Harry's War may refer to:

- Harry's War (1981 film), American independent film
- Harry's War (1999 film), Australian short film

== See also ==
- The Secret War of Harry Frigg, 1968 comedy film set in World War II
