= Ignorance Is Bliss (Tiddas song) =

Single by Tiddas

from the album Tiddas
- Released: 8 July 1996
- Length: 2:56
- Label: ID, Mercury Records
- Songwriter(s): Lou Bennett, Sally Dastey
- Producer(s): Joe Camilleri

Tiddas singles chronology
"Changing Times" (1995)	"Ignorance Is Bliss" (1996)	"Walk Alone" (1997)

"Ignorance Is Bliss" is a song recorded by Australian folk band Tiddas. The song was released in July 1996 as the lead single from the band's second studio album, Tiddas. The song peaked at number 97 on the ARIA Charts. The song is inspired by an argument with Bob Geldof while touring in 1993.

At the Deadly Awards 1997, the song won Single Release of the Year.

== Background and release ==
In 2013, Lou Bennett told the story of the song to Deadly Magazine. She recalls Tiddas were performing with American group Sweet Honey in the Rock and Bob Geldof in 1993. Bennett said she remembers the tour well and said Gelfod ‘baited’ the girls into thinking about why they were singing and what they were singing about. “He wanted us to articulate what it was that we were doing, why were we singing about these issues, and in our minds we thought we were doing the right thing presenting songs that affected us and affected our families and friends.” Bennett said this made the group angry and they went back to their room and wrote "Ignorance Is Bliss" in response.

== Track listing ==
single
No.	Title	Writer(s)	Length
1.	"Ignorance Is Bliss"	Lou Bennett, Sally Dastey	2:56
2.	"Neighborhood Houses"	David Juriansz	4:44
3.	"Nan's House"	Bennett, Dastey, Amy Saunders	2:59
Total length:			10:39

== Charts ==
Chart (1996)	Peak position
Australia (ARIA)	97

== Release history ==
Region	Date	Format	Edition(s)	Label	Catalogue
Australia	July 1996	CD single	Standard	ID, Mercury Records	5782672
