= Sing About Life =

Studio album by Tiddas
- Released: November 1993

Tiddas chronology
Inside My Kitchen (1992)	Sing About Life (1993)	Tiddas (1996)

Singles from Sing About Live
- 1. "Waiting" Released: November 1993; 2. "Real World" Released: 1994; 3. "Changing Times" Released: 1995

Sing About Life is the debut studio album by Australian three-piece folk group Tiddas. The album was released in November 1993 and peaked at number 36 on the ARIA Charts and was certified gold in Australia. The album was re-released in 1994 with a bonus live disc.

At the ARIA Music Awards of 1994, the album received two nominations; Breakthrough Artist - Album and Best Indigenous Release, winning the ARIA for Best Indigenous Release.

== Background ==
In 2016, member Lou Bennett recalled that they could sit around the kitchen table and sing all day. They'd start early in the morning, sharing and writing songs, working out harmonies, having short breaks and almost forgetting to eat. They were just too busy having a damn good time together. Bennett recalled that the making of Sing About Life was an "intensely emotional time" and it was not uncommon for the members to argue, make up, then do it all again adding "it wasn't animosity though, it was creative tension." Bennett said the band came to be known as 'difficult women' because they weren't about to say yes to whatever expectations were put on them to fit into a marketing model in order to sell records. Tiddas stood their ground, knowing that being told to lose weight, wear different clothes and pluck their eyebrows had nothing to do with their development as artists.

== Recording ==
Producer Tony Cohen said, "We recorded part of the album in front of a live audience, which was moving. There must have been more than 50 people there. We kept it simple, mic'd up their voices and guitars and off they went. Recorded to 2-inch tape."

== Track listing ==
No.	Title	Writer(s)	Length
1.	"By Your Side"	Lou Bennett	2:38
2.	"My Sister"	Sally Dastey	1:51
3.	"Ann's Song"	Dastey	2:03
4.	"Real World"	Bennett, Dastey	2:19
5.	"Tiddas"		1:14
6.	"Inanay"	Bennett	1:57
7.	"Malcolm Smith"	Richard Frankland	2:35
8.	"Changing Times"		3:10
9.	"Share a Dream"	Bennett, Dastey	2:40
10.	"Holdin' Back"	Bennett, Dastey	2:32
11.	"Poison Blood"	Bennett, Dastey, Amy Saunders	1:48
12.	"She's Dreamin'"		2:32
13.	"Tokoua"		2:43
14.	"Waiting"		3:01
15.	"Caught in a Web"		2:35
16.	"Wasted Time"		2:32
17.	"Nobody Talkin'"		2:38
18.	"Long Time Now"		2:46
19.	"Sing About Life"		5:19

Flat Notes and Bad Jokes (Live)
No.	Title	Writer(s)	Length
1.	"Waiting"		3:22
2.	"Inside My Kitchen"	Bennett	3:50
3.	"Innanay"		2:00
4.	"Tiddas"		1:04
5.	"Malcolm Smith"		3:24
6.	"Spirit of the Winter Tree"		3:33
7.	"Real World"		2:45
8.	"She's Dreamin'"		2:33
9.	"Sing About Life"		1:47

== Charts ==
Chart (1993)	Peak position
Australian Albums (ARIA)	36

== Certifications ==
Region	Certification	Certified units/sales
Australia (ARIA)	Gold	35,000^{^}
^{^} Shipments figures based on certification alone.

== Release history ==
Region	Date	Format(s)	Label	Catalogue
Australia	November 1993	Compact disc	Polygram	5183482
Australia	1994	2xCD	Polygram	5183482/LIVE CD-2
United States of America	1995	CD	Loose Cannon, Island Records	314528583-2
