= Inside My Kitchen =

EP by Tiddas
- Released: October 1992
- Genre: Indie pop; Indie rock; blues
- Producer: Paul Petran

Tiddas chronology
Inside My Kitchen (1992)	Sing About Life (1993)

Singles from Inside My Kitchen
- 1. "Inside My Kitchen" Released: 1992

Inside My Kitchen is the debut extended play (EP) by Australian three-piece folk group Tiddas. The EP was released in October 1992.

In 2018, Lou Bennett said of the title track "I wrote “Inside My Kitchen” after my partner at the time had a psychotic episode. It was one of my first compositions and it helped me cope with this new and traumatic experience. Then a few years later I recorded it with Amy and Sal on our first EP. It was an important song in the lifetime of Tiddas. It became one of our main signature songs and still is today. We created many of our songs around the kitchen table together and after an eight-year spell, it gives me great pleasure to come back to the stage with Amy and Sal to perform it again."

At the ARIA Music Awards of 1993, the EP received two nominations; Best New Talent and Best Indigenous Release.

== Track listing ==
No.	Title	Writer(s)	Length
1.	"My Brother"	Frank Cleary, Sally Dastey	2:06
2.	"Koori Woman"	Lou Bennett	3:18
3.	"Spirit of the Winter Tree"	Bennett, Kym Walker	3:36
4.	"Inside My Kitchen"	Bennett	3:27
5.	"Happy Earth"	Bennett, Dastey, Amy Saunders	2:34
6.	"Things I Can't Undo"	Bennett, Dastey, Saunders	1:39

== Chart ==
Weekly chart performance for "Inside My Kitchen" on single chart
Chart (1992)	Peak position
Australia (ARIA)	145

Weekly chart performance for Inside My Kitchen on album chart
Chart (1993)	Peak position
Australian Albums (ARIA)	193

== Release history ==
Region	Date	Format(s)	Label	Catalogue
Australia	October 1992	Compact disc	Black Heart Music	ID 0002-2
