= David Page (musician) =

Australian music director associated with Bangarra Dance Theatre

- Born: Roy David Page; 1961
- Died: 28 April 2016 (aged 55)
- Other name: Dubboo
- Occupations: Artistic director; Music director
- Known for: Involvement in Bangarra Dance Theatre
- Relatives: Stephen Page (brother), Russell Page (brother), Kirk Page (cousin)

Roy David Page (1961 – 28 April 2016), known as Dubboo to his close friends, was an Australian composer (he preferred the term "songman") who was the music director of the Bangarra Dance Theatre. He was descended from the Nunukul people and the Munaldjali clan of the Yugambeh people of south-east Queensland, and brother of choreographer Stephen Page and dancer Russell Page. He was also an actor, singer and drag artist.

== Early life and education ==
Page was born in Brisbane, the eighth of twelve children, and grew up in Mount Gravatt. His father was Aboriginal/Chinese and his mother was of Maori, Spanish, Irish and Aboriginal heritage. Two of his brothers were Stephen Page and Russell Page, and Kirk Page was his cousin.

Page embarked on a singing career as a teenager under the name "Little Davey Page", and was the first Australian to be signed to Atlantic Records. He released a cover of the Neil Sedaka song Happy Birthday Sweet Sixteen in 1975, and appeared on TV shows including Countdown and The Paul Hogan Show.

Page studied saxophone, voice and composition at the Centre for Aboriginal Studies in Music within the Elder Conservatorium of Music at the University of Adelaide.

He became known as "Dubboo" to his friends.

== Career ==
Page worked at NAISDA Dance College as music producer as well as bus driver and janitor. He joined the Bangarra Dance Theatre in 1991 as resident composer along with his brothers Stephen Page (choreographer) and Russell (dancer), turning it into a "global phenomenon". Page composed the scores for 27 of Bangarra's works. He was appointed Artist-in-Residence in 2011. His last composition was for the company's work Nyapanyapa, which premiered in June 2016. He described himself as a "songman" rather than a composer, saying "I dream it and I'm good at producing it".

Page performed a one-man show of his life story, directed by his brother Stephen, called Page 8, at the Belvoir St Theatre in 1994 and then toured it in Edinburgh and London, restaging it in 2014 for Bangarra's 25th anniversary. He performed in the Queensland Theatre Company's production of Mother Courage and her children in 2013, and the QTC and Sydney Festival production Black Diggers in 2014.

Page appeared on screen in television shows Prisoner and Black Comedy, made a brief appearance in the 1997 film Oscar and Lucinda as an Aboriginal busker and in Bran Nue Dae (2009) as a dancer. He played a DJ, Kenny, in the 2005 half-hour film Green Bush, directed by Warwick Thornton.

Page collaborated with Steve Francis on music for the 2000 Summer Olympics opening ceremony and the Sydney Olympic Arts Festival in 2000, and the Sydney Dreaming Festival in 2002. He composed music for The Australian Ballet's Alchemy in 1997 and Amalgamate (with Elena Kats-Chernin) in 2007. Page composed music for various television programs including Heartland, Songlines, and Living Black. His film scores included Kanyini (2006), Hush (2007), and Jacob (2009).

In 2015, he composed the music for his brother Stephen's directorial film debut, Spear.

He was among the creatives involved in the project Three Brothers, developed from 2013 and performed by Northern Rivers Performing Arts as Djurra in 2017, after his death. It was directed by his cousin Kirk Page.

== Death and legacy ==
Page died on 28 April 2016 at the age of 55. His family declined to reveal the cause of death. A memorial was held at the Queensland Performing Arts Centre with tributes from Wesley Enoch, Christine Anu, Ursula Yovich and Dan Sultan, before he was buried in a private family ceremony.

A show created to honour Page was staged by Bangarra, with guest artists including Archie Roach, Ursula Yovich and others, at Carriageworks in Sydney in 2019, called Dubboo – life of a songman in December 2018. A film of the same name, including some of this performance as well as older documentary footage and tributes by the family and others, was released in 2021.

The David Page Music Fellowship was inaugurated by Bangarra in 2017, "in recognition of David's extraordinary life, his multi-talents and his contribution across so many theatrical productions". It provides mentorship and financial support for one or more music or sound artists to work in a collaborative environment for Fellows spend at least four weeks at Bangarra's studios. If the fellows are not from Sydney, flights and accommodation are paid for, and fees are paid for final compositions as well as for time working at Bangarra

== Awards and nominations ==
=== ARIA Music Awards ===
The ARIA Music Awards is an annual awards ceremony that recognises excellence, innovation, and achievement across all genres of Australian music.

Year	Nominee / work	Award	Result	Ref.
1995	Heartland (as various artists)	Best Original Soundtrack, Cast or Show Album	Nominated	

=== The Deadly Awards ===
The Deadly Awards, commonly known simply as The Deadlys, was an annual celebration of Australian Aboriginal and Torres Strait Islander achievement in music, sport, entertainment and community. The ran from 1995 to 2013.

Year	Nominee / work	Award	Result	Ref.
Deadly Awards 1996	Alchemy (Page)	Excellence in Film or Theatre Score	Won	
Deadly Awards 1997	Fish (Page)	Excellence in Film or Theatrical Score:	Won	
Deadly Awards 2002	Skin by Bangarra Dance Theatre (Page and Steve Francis:)	Excellence in Film or Theatrical Score	Won	

=== Green Room Awards ===
Page won the Green Room Award for Best New Australian Play in 2006 for Page 8.

=== Helpmann Awards ===
The Helpmann Awards is an awards show, celebrating live entertainment and performing arts in Australia, presented by industry group Live Performance Australia (LPA) since 2001.

Year	Nominee / work	Award	Result	Ref.
2004	Unaipon (Clan Act I) (by Bangarra Dance Theatre)	Helpmann Award for Best Original Score	Nominated	
2009	Mathinna (by Bangarra Dance Theatre)	Best Original Score	Won	
2012	Belong with Steve Francis (by Bangarra Dance Theatre)	Best Original Score	Won	
2013	TERRAIN (by Bangarra Dance Theatre)	Best Original Score	Nominated	
2014	Blak with PaulMac (by Bangarra Dance Theatre)	Best Original Score	Nominated	
2016	Ochres (by Bangarra Dance Theatre)	Best Original Score	Nominated	

=== Sidney Myer Performing Arts Awards ===
The Sidney Myer Performing Arts Awards commenced in 1984 and recognise outstanding achievements in dance, drama, comedy, music, opera, circus and puppetry.

Year	Nominee / work	Award	Result
2001	David Page	Individual Award	awarded
