= Nindethana Theatre =

Australian Aboriginal theatre group

- Industry: Theatre
- Founded: 1971; 55 years ago
- Founders: Jack Charles & Bob Maza
- Defunct: 1974
- Headquarters: Melbourne, Australia
- Products: Theatre productions by Aboriginal people

Nindethana Theatre was Australia's first Aboriginal theatre company, founded in Melbourne in 1971, with its last performance in Adelaide in 1974.

== Establishment and aims ==
The theatre company was formed after the Australia Council for the Arts asked Jack Charles to form a group of Aboriginal actors. The initial cohort consisted of seven young people from Aboriginal hostels in Melbourne, four of whom had never acted before.

Nindethana was established by Charles and Bob Maza at the Pram Factory in Melbourne in 1971, with help from New Zealand-born playwright, theatre director, and actor John Smythe and others. Its stated objective was "the performance, encouragement and promotion of Aboriginal drama, music, art, literature, film production and other such cultural activities in the community". It was the first Aboriginal theatre group in the country.

== Productions ==
The first production planned was Rocket Range, by Jim Crawford, but that did not get staged due to production difficulties and lack of trained staff. Their earliest production was The Cherry Pickers, in August 1971, written by Kevin Gilbert and recognised as the first Aboriginal play. In 1972, the theatre staged a performance called Jack Charles is up and fighting (1972).

In November 1972, Brumby Innes: A Play in Three Acts, by Katharine Susannah Prichard, was staged, in a production that was so successful that a grant was given to film it. It was filmed at Channel 0 in Melbourne (later part of Network 10), airing in June 1973, which led to other acting opportunities for some of the cast members. A sound recording produced by the Australian Broadcasting Corporation in 1993, is held at Fryer Library at the University of Queensland Library.

In 1973 the theatre company was awarded a fellowship by the Aboriginal and Torres Strait Islander Arts Board to visit Adelaide, South Australia, to perform at the Adelaide Festival of Arts, as well as Horsham, Murray Bridge and Yalata Aboriginal settlements. They performed Mission and Urban Identity at Nindethana in Melbourne in 1973 and then in Adelaide in 1974.

== See also ==
- National Black Theatre (Australia), in Sydney in the 1970s
