= James Munro (sealer) =

Australian convict and Bass Strait sealer

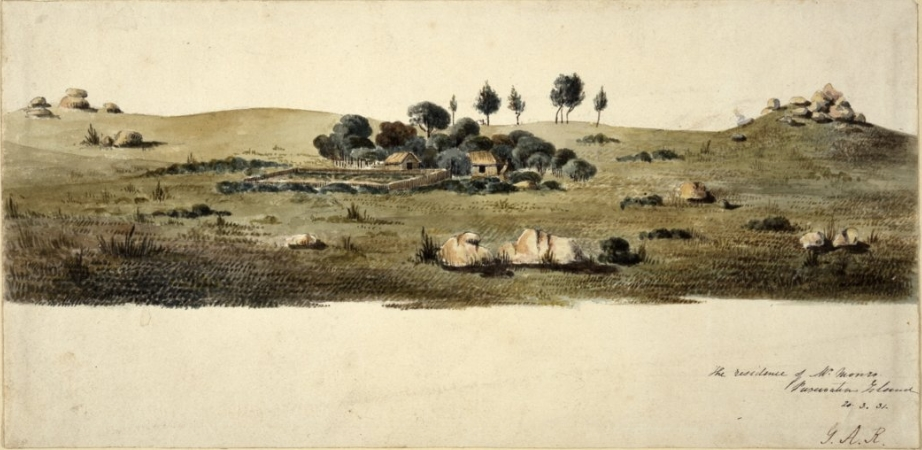
Munro's establishment, surrounded by a cluster of trees (pen and grey ink and watercolour, by Henry Laing, 1831)

James Munro (c. 1779 – c. 1845) was a British convict who was transported to Australia, and later established himself as a farmer on Preservation Island, Tasmania, and community leader of the region's community of European seal hunters, known as "King of the Eastern Straits".

Munro established himself on the island, with him and various Aboriginal female partners being the only inhabitants. He built structures, farmed, raised livestock, and harvested the meat and eggs of mutton birds. At different times, six Tasmanian Aboriginal women, "a native of New Holland" (the historical name for Australia), and a woman from New Zealand lived with him.

Munro was appointed a local constable in 1825, and opposed George Augustus Robinson's attempts to prevent relationships between sealers and Aboriginal women. It is still disputed as to how consensual those relationships were. Some argue that they were often voluntary and mutually beneficial, but Munro was accused in 1830 of leading sealers in raiding parties to capture Aboriginal women.

He died in December 1844 or January 1845 on the and was buried near his home. The Hobart Town Courier published an obituary of him which praised his kindness. It reported that he left three children by an Aboriginal woman. Louisa Briggs was possibly his granddaughter.

Mount Munro and Munro Bay on Cape Barren Island were named after him.

== See also ==
- George Briggs (sealer)
