= Message Stick =

Australian television series

- Country of origin: Australia
- Original language: English

Production
- Running time: 30 minutes

Original release
- Network: Australian Broadcasting Corporation
- Release: 1999 – July 2012

Message Stick is an Australian television series about Aboriginal and Torres Strait Islander lifestyles, culture and issues.

== History ==
The weekly half-hour show began screening in 1999 on ABC Television. It featured profile stories, interviews, video clips, short films and cooking segments. The last show went to air in July 2012.

Presenters included Aden Ridgeway (from July 2006), Miriam Corowa, Rachael Maza, Kelrick Martin, Deborah Mailman, and Trisha Morton-Thomas.

== Selected episodes ==
- "Bill's Wake" (2001) – About the wake held by Bill Neidjie, a traditional owner of Kakadu, while he was still alive
- "Wayne’s World" (2005) – focusing on actor/director Wayne Blair
- "Stephen Hagan" (Sunday 29 January 2006, 1.30 pm) – Aboriginal activist and former diplomat Stephen Hagan is interviewed about his campaign to have an offensive word removed from a Toowoomba sports stadium.
- "Giving Voice" (Sunday 8 November 2009, 1:30pm) – about the Northern Territory National Emergency Response, featuring Bob Randall.
- "Spinifex Man" (2009), featuring actor, writer, director, dancer and musician Trevor Jamieson, interviewed by cinematographer Allan Collins
