= Karla Grant =

Australian journalist

Karla Grant is an Australian presenter, producer and journalist for the SBS's national Indigenous current affairs program Living Black, focusing on issues concerning Aboriginal and Torres Strait Islander communities within Australia.

== Personal life ==
Grant was born in Adelaide to a Dutch father and an Aboriginal mother. She is a descendant of the Western Arrernte people.

Grant was married for 16 years to television presenter Stan Grant until 2000. They have three children.

== Media career ==
Grant hosted Aboriginal Australia on Channel 10, a programme which was also directed towards Australia's Indigenous community.

In 1994, she joined SBS, originally as producer, reporter, director and presenter on the Walkley Award-winning programme ICAM, SBS's first Indigenous current affairs show.

In 2002, she began hosting Living Black.

In 2009, Grant was appointed Executive Producer of the SBS coverage of the Deadly Awards.

During 2018, Grant was awarded a First Nations Media Award for Best Interview for the episode of Living Black in which she interviewed former prime minister Kevin Rudd.

In 2018, Grant was a co-recipient at the Kennedy Awards, where she won the John Newfong Award for Excellence in Indigenous Reporting for her work on the SBS program The Point.
