= Rachael Maza =

Australian actress

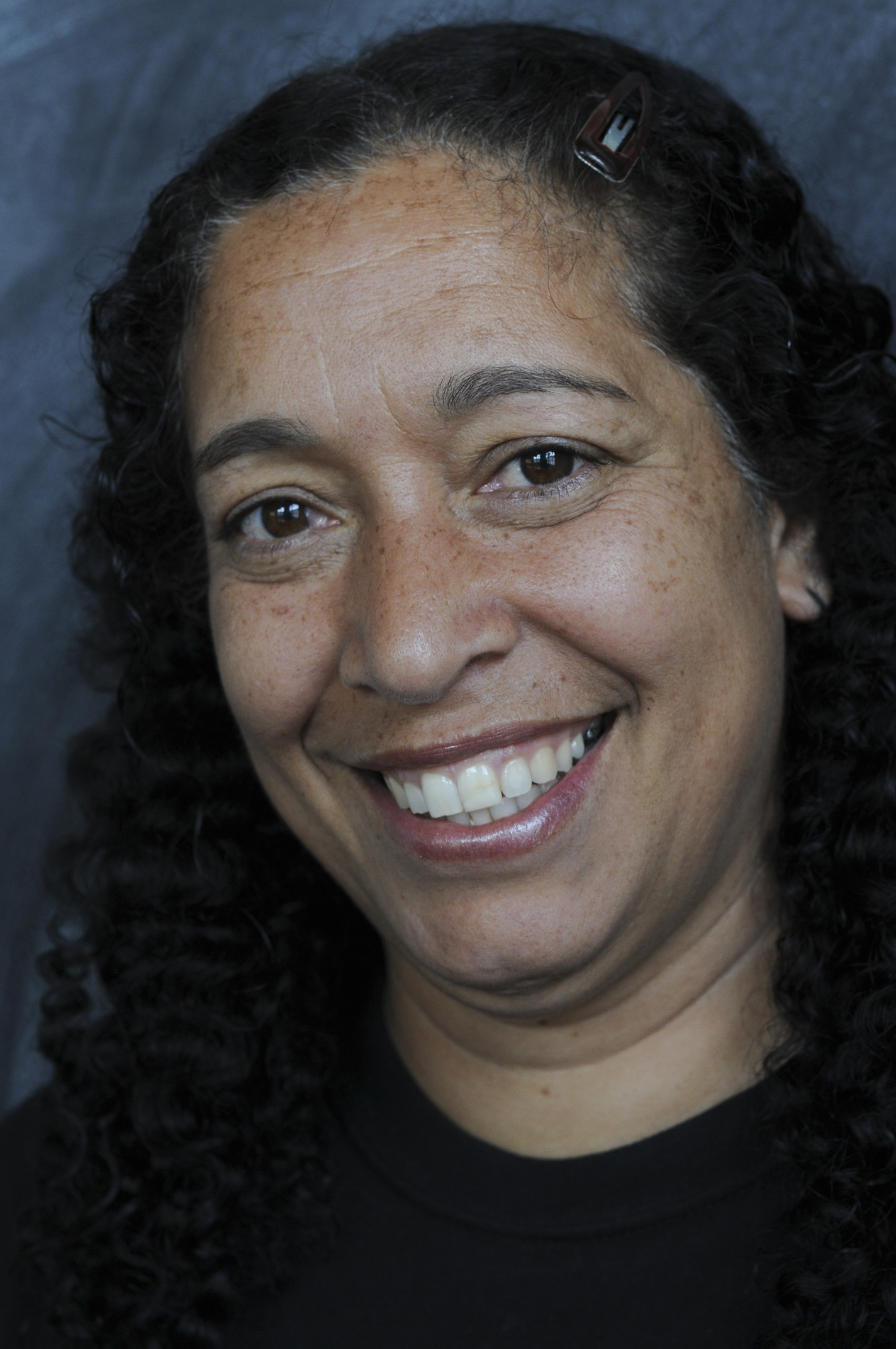
- Rachael Maza c. 2018
- Born: Rachael Zoa Maza; Australia
- Occupations: Actress, stage director, singer
- Years active: 1992–present
- Parent: Bob Maza
- Relatives: Lisa Maza (sister)

Rachael Zoa Maza AM, also credited as Rachael Maza Long, is an Indigenous Australian television and film actress, and stage director. She is known for her role in the 1998 film Radiance, and worked with Company B and Wesley Enoch in Sydney for many years. She was artistic director of Ilbijerri Theatre Company from 2008 to 2025.

== Early life and education ==
Rachael Zoa Maza is of Dutch, Torres Strait Islander (Meriam Mir) and Aboriginal Australian heritage, the daughter of Bob Maza, also an actor. She has a younger sister Lisa, and their father would encourage them to play guitar and sing together.

She is a graduate of the Western Australian Academy of Performing Arts.

== Career ==
=== Stage ===
Maza has numerous stage credits (sometimes credited as Rachael Maza Long), since at least 1992. She worked with Company B and Wesley Enoch for many years, with her performances at the Belvoir St Theatre including leading roles in Conversations with the Dead and The Dreamers. She again worked with Enoch in The Sapphires, staged by the Melbourne Theatre Company and Sydney Festival.

She directed Lou Bennett's play Show Us Your Tiddas! in 2007. In 2009, she appeared on stage with her younger sister, Lisa Maza, in a play that they had co-written. They were also sisters in the play. Also in that year, the sisters co-created Sisters of Gelam, which incorporated cabaret, puppetry, dance, and spoken word to present a story about two sisters who travel to the Torres Strait Island of Mer, their grandfather's Country.

From 2008 to 2025, Maza was artistic director and co-CEO of Ilbijerri Theatre Company. In 2024, for Ilbijerri, she co-directed the musical Big names, no blankets about the formation of the Warumpi Band. Her co-director was Anyupa Butcher, the daughter of band member Sammy Butcher.

In February 2026, Maza is appearing on stage with her sister Lisa at the Malthouse Theatre in Melbourne, in the world premiere of Jada Alberts' play Black Light, directed by Alberts.

=== Television and film ===
Maza's first outing on Australian television was in the ABC Television series Heartland in 1994. She and Lillian Crombie, who also appeared in the series, were fresh out of acting school at that time. The series was written by Aboriginal Australians ans starred many Aboriginal actors, as well as Cate Blanchett in her first screen outing.

She worked as a TV presenter on ABC Television's weekly show focusing on Indigenous Australians, Message Stick. and SBS's ICAM in 1997–1998.

Maza has numerous credits as an actor in television series, including Wentworth, Winners and Losers, Halifax f.p., Stingers, SeaChange, Heartland (in which her father also had a role), A Country Practice, and Miss Fisher's Murder Mysteries.

She acted in the films Cosi (1996), Radiance (1998), and Lilian's Story (1996).

=== Other activities ===
Rachael and Lisa Maza played and sung together as the Maza Sisters, performing at several festivals and events, including the Dreaming Festival in 2009 and the 150th anniversary of the National Gallery of Victoria in 2011.

Maza was deputy chair from 2014, and then, from 2016, chair of The Black Arm Band theatre organisation until it closed down in December 2017.

In September 2024, Maza was appointed co-chair, with Philip Watkins (CEO of Desart), of First Nations Arts, a newly-established division of the Australia Council, for a term of four years.

== Recognition and honours ==
In 2020 Maza was made a Member of the Order of Australia, for significant service to the performing arts as an artistic director.

=== Awards ===
Year	Award	Work	Category	Result
2002	Green Room Awards	Holy Day	Best Female Actor in a Leading Role (Drama)	Won
	Sydney Theatre Critics Circle Awards	Radiance	Best Performance	Won

== Personal life ==
Maza has a son, Ariel, with actor Tom Long.

== Filmography ==
=== Film ===
Year	Title	Role	Type
1996	Cosi	Nurse at Concert	Feature film
1996	Lilian's Story	Shade	Feature film
1996	Fistful of Flies	Dr Powers	Feature film
1996	Goblin Market		Short film
1998	Radiance	Cressy	Feature film
1999	Burnout		Short film
2009	My Year Without Sex	Intensive Care Nurse	Feature film
2009	Aunty Maggie and the Womba Wakgun	Aunty Maggie	Short film
2009	Nia’s Melancholy	Nana	Short film

=== Television ===
Year	Title	Role	Type
1987	Frontier	Marnie Kennedy	Miniseries, 3 episodes
1993	A Country Practice	Ruth Forbes	TV series, 8 episodes
1994	Heartland	Leila Sutton	Miniseries, 8 episodes
1995-2002	ICAM	Presenter	TV series
1996	Naked: Stories of Men	Jessica	TV series, 1 episode
1999	SeaChange	Mrs Armistead	TV series, 1 episode
1999	Stingers	Meagan Quinn	TV series, 1 episode
2000	Round the Twist	Genevieve	TV series, 1 episode
2000	Halifax f.p.	Church Singer	TV series, 1 episode
2001	The Micallef Program	Vanessa O’Malley	TV series, 1 episode
2002	Marshall Law	Davina	Miniseries, 1 episode
2002	Message Stick	Presenter	TV series
2009-10	Rush	Detective Carroll	TV series, 2 episodes
2013	Miss Fisher's Murder Mysteries	Cora Derrimut	TV series, 1 episode
2016	Winners and Losers	Veronica Sewell	TV series, 5 episodes
2016-17	Wentworth	Imogen Fessler	TV series
2017	Newton’s Law	Judge Pauline Evans	Miniseries, 1 episode
2017	The Secret Daughter	Aunty Mim	TV series, 3 episodes
2022	Beep and Mort	Mae (voice)	TV series
2022	Fisk	Bridget	TV series, 1 episode
2022	Looking Black	Self	TV special
2023	Crazy Fun Park	Winnie	TV series, 1 episode

== Stage ==
=== Actor ===
Year	Title	Venue
1992	The Grace of Mary Traverse	The Studio Theatre, Subiaco
1993	Made in Spain	La Mama Theatre
1993	Radiance	Belvoir Street Theatre
1994	Ninni	Enmore Theatre
1995	Tongues of Stone	Belvoir Street Theatre
1996	The Commission / The Aboriginal Protesters	The Performance Space Redfern & German tour
1997	The Tempest (Miranda)	Australian tour - Bell Shakespeare Company
2001	Aliwa!	Subiaco Theatre Centre
2001	The Twilight Series	Collins Street Baptist Church
2001	Holy Day (lead role)	Malthouse Theatre, The Playhouse Adelaide
2002	Enuff	Malthouse Theatre
2002	The Dreamers (lead role)	Belvoir Street Theatre
2003	Conversations with the Dead (lead role)	Belvoir Street Theatre
2003	The Bridge	Trades Hall New Ballroom
2003-04	Stolen	Victorian tour
2004	Riverland	Brisbane Powerhouse
2004	Yandy	Octagon Theatre
2005	The Sapphires	MTC, Sydney Festival, Belvoir Street Theatre, Playhouse Melbourne
2005	Riverland	The Curtin Theatre
2007-08	Show Us Your Tiddas!	Australian tour
2008	Jacky Jacky in the Box	Federation Square
2009	A Black Sheep Walks Into A Baa	Melbourne Town Hall
2006-09	Chopped Liver	Australian tour
2009	Sisters Of Gelam	Malthouse Theatre
2010	Black Sheep: Glorious Baastards	Melbourne Town Hall
2011, 2012, 2013, 2014	Jack Charles V The Crown	Australia/NZ/UK tour
2011, 2012, 2015, 2016	Coranderrk: We Will Show the Country	Sydney Opera House, | La Mama Theatre
2012	Foley	Sydney Opera House, Fairfax Studio
2012, 2015	Beautiful One Day	Belvoir Street Theatre, Cremorne Theatre
2014	20 Questions	Belvoir Street Theatre
2015-16	The Rabbits	Australian tour
2016, 2018, 2020	Jack Charles V The Crown	Fairfax Studio, Canadian tour, NZ tour, Online
2017	Which Way Home	Belvoir Street Theatre
2019	The Honouring	La Mama Theatre
2018-19	My Urrwai	The Butter Factory Theatre, Belvoir Street Theatre
2020	Black Ties	Australia/NZ tour
2026	Black Light	Malthouse (world premiere)

=== Director ===
Year	Title	Venue
	Chopped Liver	Australian / international tour
2003-04	Stolen	Victorian tour
2007-08	Show Us Your Tiddas!	Australian tour
2008	Jacky Jacky in the Box	Federation Square
2009	Sisters Of Gelam	Malthouse Theatre
2009	A Black Sheep Walks Into A Baa	Melbourne Town Hall
2010	Black Sheep: Glorious Baastards	Melbourne Town Hall
2012	Foley	Sydney Opera House, Fairfax Studio
