= ICAM (TV series) =

Australian television show

- Presented by: Karla Grant
- Country of origin: Australia
- Original language: English

Original release
- Network: SBS
- Release: 1995 – 2002

ICAM was an Australian television program focusing on Indigenous affairs that aired on SBS from 1995 until 2002.

ICAM was the first Indigenous affairs program on SBS, and during its run was the only prime time Indigenous affairs program broadcast on national television in Australia. ICAM aired weekly and was hosted by Karla Grant. Rachael Maza was a presenter on the program, at least during 1997 and 1998, when it changed its airing slot to a Sunday.

Production wound back in 2001, and Grant went on to develop ICAM's successor, Living Black. In its final year of production, the program won a Walkley Award for Coverage of Indigenous Affairs, for journalist Julie Nimmo's story "No Fixed Address".
