= David Ngoombujarra =

Australian actor

David Ngiombujarra
- Born: David Bernard Starr; 27 June 1967; Meekatharra, Western Australia, Australia
- Died: 17 July 2011 (aged 44); Fremantle, Western Australia, Australia
- Occupation: Actor
- Relatives: Ernie Dingo (cousin)

David Ngoombujarra (27 June 1967 – 17 July 2011) was an Indigenous Australian actor of the Yamatji people. Born David Bernard Starr in Meekatharra, Western Australia, his acting career spanned over two decades from the late 1980s to 2010; he won three Australian Film Institute Awards. On 17 July 2011 he was found in a park in Fremantle, and taken to Fremantle Hospital where he was pronounced dead.

== Personal life ==
Ngoombujarra was adopted by Amy and Derek Sloan, and met his birth mother when he was 14. He moved to Sydney with plans for stardom and picked up some minor film roles in Young Einstein and others after being spotted busking in Circular Quay. His wide smile and booming laugh were very marketable. Ngoombujarra fell into petty crime and battled alcohol addiction which may have contributed to his death.

It was revealed that Ngoombujara fathered a daughter who was later adopted by his cousin, actor Ernie Dingo.

== Filmography ==
=== Film ===
Year	Title	Role	Notes
1988	Breaking Loose	Davie	Film
1988	Young Einstein	Aboriginal dancer	Feature film
1993	Blackfellas	Floyd 'Pretty Boy' Davies	Feature film
1994	Dallas Doll	Storyteller	Feature film
1996	No Way to Forget	Shane Francis	Short film
1999	The Missing	Willie	Feature film
1999	Harry's War	Harry Saunders	TV short film
2001	Serenades	Joseph	
2001	Crocodile Dundee in Los Angeles	Arthur	Feature film
2002	Rabbit-Proof Fence	Rabbit hunter	Feature film
2002	Black and White	Young Max Stuart	Feature film
2003	Kangaroo Jack	Snr. Sgt. 'Mr Jimmy' Inkamale	Feature film
2003	Yamajti Man	Narrator	
2003	Ned Kelly	Tribesman	Feature film
2005	The Adventures of Roman Pilgrim	Albert	Short film
2008	Australia	Magarri	Feature film

=== Television ===
Year	Title	Role	Notes
1994	Heartland	Majadi Burunga	TV series, 4 episodes
1995	Janus	Ray	TV series, episode: "Fit to Plead"
1995	Correlli	Warren 'Budgie' Keating	TV miniseries, episode: "Spoons"
1995	Snowy River: The McGregor Saga	Ninawunda	TV series, episode: "Man and Boy"
1998	Kings in Grass Castles	Burrakin	TV series, 2 episodes
2004	Parallax	Otto	TV series, 6 episodes
2007-2010	The Circuit	Harry Pope	TV series, 6 episodes, (final appearance)

== Awards ==
- AFI Best Supporting Actor in Television Drama for The Circuit (2007)
- AFI Best Actor in a Supporting Role for Black and White (2002)
- AFI Best Actor in a Supporting Role for Day of the Dog (1993)
