= Black Arm Band =

Australian music theatre organisation

Black Arm Band is a former Aboriginal Australian and Torres Strait Islander music theatre company. Founded in 2006, it mounted large productions in many major festivals and showcased the talents of many Indigenous Australians over the years, until its closure in December 2018.

== History ==
The organisation was founded in 2006 by Steven Richardson, who was then artistic director of Arts House in Melbourne. The organisation's name comes from a speech by former Australian prime minister John Howard, who referred to a "black armband view of history".

Their first show, murundak (meaning "alive" in Woiwurrung), debuted in the Hamer Hall at the October 2006 Melbourne International Arts Festival and afterwards played around Australia and internationally in London. Their second show, Hidden Republic, debuted at the 2008 Melbourne International Arts Festival. Black Arm Band continued to mount productions at many major festivals in the following years.

In 2009 the new artistic director of the renamed Melbourne Festival, Brett Sheehy, continued the relationship with Black Arm Band. This saw the commissioning and presentation of the world premiere of Dirtsong, a piece of musical theatre conceived and directed by Steven Richardson, in 2009. With words written by Miles Franklin Award-winner Alexis Wright, Dirtsong, included both contemporary and traditional songs, and was a celebration of preservation of Indigenous languages. The show was reprised for the 2014 Adelaide Festival, with performers including Trevor Jamieson (who was not in the 2009 version), Archie Roach, Lou Bennett, Emma Donovan, Paul Dempsey, and many other singers and musicians. Some of the songs were sung in Aboriginal languages.

Seven Songs to Leave Behind (2010) was also conceived and directed by Richardson. Seven Songs was an international collaboration by contemporary Indigenous singers and musicians, including Gurrumul Yunupingu, joined by Sinéad O'Connor, John Cale, Rickie Lee Jones, and Meshell Ndegeocello. In 2010, Black Arm Band appeared at the Queen Elizabeth Hall in London and at the Winter Olympics in Vancouver, Canada.

Notes From the Hard Road And Beyond (2011, also by Richardson) saw Mavis Staples, Joss Stone, Emmanuel Jal and Paul Dempsey join Black Arm Band to celebrate protest music from the 1960s through to contemporary Indigenous songs of activism.

In 2017, Black Arm Band celebrated its 10th anniversary with a concert at the City Recital Hall in Sydney.

=== Governance and funding ===
Steven Richardson was the founding chair or director. For several years the organisation's affairs were handled by Melbourne consultants Auspicious Arts, but in 2011 it became an autonomous company. Funding initially came from the Australia Council, but after the funding cuts in 2015, it received funding from Creative Victoria and some private foundations, corporate sponsors, and philanthropists. In 2016, the Office of the Registrar of Indigenous Corporations found housekeeping problems and other irregularities in the organisation's governance, record-keeping, and financial management.

Richardson left Black Arm Band in May 2014. In that year, Brook Andrew became chair and Rachael Maza deputy chair. In 2016, Andrew left, with Maza taking his place as chair. The organisation closed down in December 2017, after experiencing a series of financial difficulties.

== Members ==
Members were drawn from around Australia and include both blackfella and white musicians with diverse musical backgrounds.

Members have included:

- David Arden
- Mark Atkins
- Lou Bennett
- Deline Briscoe
- George Burarrwanga
- John Butler
- Liz Cavanagh
- Sally Dastey
- Emma Donovan
- Kutcha Edwards
- Dewayne Everettsmith
- Leah Flanagan
- Carole Fraser
- Joe Geia
- Shane Howard
- Ruby Hunter
- Paul Kelly
- Bunna Lawrie
- Jimmy Little
- Yirrmal Marika
- Lisa Maza
- Rachael Maza
- Djolpa McKenzie
- Shellie Morris
- Stephen Pigram
- Archie Roach
- Amy Saunders
- Dan Sultan
- Bart Willoughby
- Ursula Yovich
- Gurrumul Yunupingu
- Gabanbulu Yunupingu

== Productions ==
- murundak, 2006
- Hidden Republic, 2008
- Dirtsong, 2009
- Seven Songs to Leave Behind, 2010
- Notes from the Hard Road and Beyond, 2011
- Mamiaith - Mother Tongue, 2012
- Ngangwarra means heart, 2013
- Nyami, a collaboration with the Bangarra Dance Theatre, in production 2018

== Discography ==
=== Albums ===
Title	Details
Murundak Live	Released: October 2006; Label: Art House; Format: CD, DD; Recorded at Hamer Hall, Melbourne
Hidden Republic Live (with The Melbourne Symphony Orchestra)	Released: October 2008; Label: Art House; Format: 2xCD, DD; Recorded at State Theatre, Melbourne
Dirtsong (as The Black Arm Band Company)	Released: 2009; Label: MGM Distribution; Format: CD+DVD, DD

== Awards ==
- In 2013, the group won the Building Health through the Arts Award.

=== The Deadly Awards ===
The Deadly Awards, commonly known simply as The Deadlys, was an annual celebration of Australian Aboriginal and Torres Strait Islander achievement in music, sport, entertainment and community. The ran from 1995 to 2013.

Year	Nominee / work	Award	Result	Ref.
Deadly Awards 2008	Black Arm Band	Band of the Year	Won	

=== Helpmann Awards ===
The Helpmann Awards is an awards show, celebrating live entertainment and performing arts in Australia, presented by industry group Live Performance Australia since 2001. Note: 2020 and 2021 were cancelled due to the COVID-19 pandemic.

Year	Nominee / work	Award	Result	Ref.
2010	Dirtsong (with Steven Richardson and Alexis Wright)	Helpmann Award for Best New Australian Work	Nominated	

=== Sidney Myer Performing Arts Awards ===
The Sidney Myer Performing Arts Awards commenced in 1984 and recognise outstanding achievements in dance, drama, comedy, music, opera, circus and puppetry.

Year	Nominee / work	Award	Result	Ref.
2010	Black Arm Band	Group Award	awarded	
