= Alex Pearce (Australian footballer) =

Australian rules footballer (born 1995)

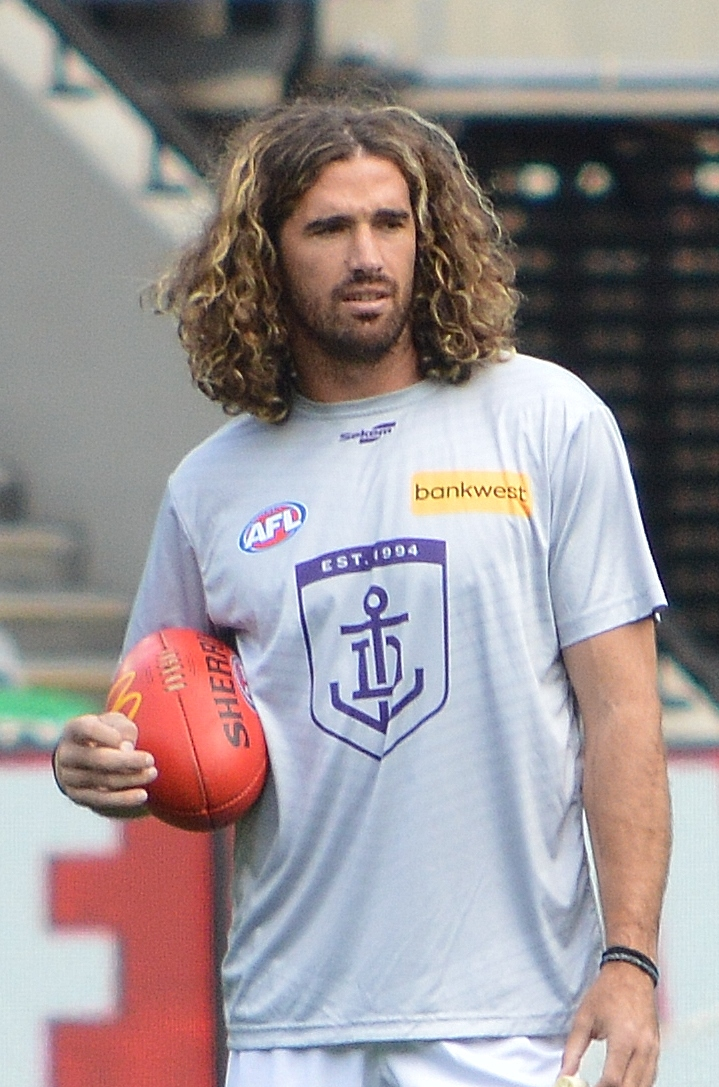
- Pearce in April 2025

Personal information
- Full name: Alex Pearce
- Nickname: Moose
- Born: 9 June 1995 (age 31)
- Original team: Ulverstone/Devonport (TSL)
- Draft: No. 37, 2013 National draft, Fremantle
- Height: 201 cm (6 ft 7 in)
- Weight: 99 kg (218 lb)
- Position: Key defender

Club information
- Current club: Fremantle
- Number: 25

Playing career^{1}
Years	Club	Games (Goals)
2014–	Fremantle	161 (9)
- ^{1} Playing statistics correct to the end of the preliminary finals, 2026.

Career highlights
- Beacon Award: 2015; Fremantle captain: 2023–; 3× Fremantle Players' Award: 2024, 2025, 2026

Alex Pearce (born 9 June 1995) is an Australian rules footballer who plays for and captains the Fremantle Football Club in the Australian Football League (AFL). Pearce was selected by Fremantle with pick 37 in the 2013 national draft and made his debut in 2015, playing as a key defender.

After several injury-interrupted seasons, Pearce established himself as a part of Fremantle's defence and was appointed club captain ahead of the 2023 season, succeeding Nat Fyfe.

== Early career ==
Pearce was born in Ulverstone, Tasmania to mother Karen and father Scott. He is of Indigenous (Palawa) descent and traces his lineage to Mannalargenna, a Chief of the Trawlwoolway clan. He grew up supporting Carlton.

Pearce played both junior football and cricket for the respective Ulverstone clubs. Attracting the eye of AFL talent scout Troy Davies, Pearce was selected in the Under 16 Tasmanian side that competed in Sydney in 2011. He impressed at the Under 18 carnival in 2012 solidifying his AFL prospects.

Drafted with the 37th selection in the 2013 AFL draft from Devonport Football Club in the Tasmanian State League, he played most of his junior football as a key forward. However, after moving to Fremantle, he played mainly as a key defender for Peel Thunder in the West Australian Football League (WAFL), Fremantle's reserve team.

== AFL career ==
=== 2015–2018: Early career and injury struggles ===
Pearce made his AFL debut for Fremantle in Round 6 of the 2015 AFL season at Domain Stadium against Essendon, replacing the injured Luke McPharlin. He was the first player to make his debut for Fremantle in 2015. He is not related to either of his former teammates who share his surname, Danyle Pearce and Clancee Pearce.

Pearce suffered a broken leg in Round 9 of the 2016 AFL season. He required surgery and didn't play another game that year. In January 2017, Pearce reinjured the same leg during a training session, causing him to miss the entire 2017 AFL season.

Ahead of the 2018 AFL season, Pearce was voted into Fremantle's leadership group. He made his return for the Dockers in Round 1 of the 2018 AFL season against Port Adelaide at Adelaide Oval. Pearce played a career-best 21 out of a possible 22 games in 2018, establishing himself as a key member in Fremantle's defensive structure.

=== 2019–2023: Return and captaincy ===
Pearce started 2019 in astonishing fashion, and was considered to be in contention for All-Australian honours. However, he broke his ankle in the win against Collingwood at the MCG in Round 11 and was subsequently ruled out for the remainder of the season.

Pearce missed the entire 2020 AFL season after complications with his recovery from a broken ankle sustained the season prior. He missed almost half of the 2021 AFL season after injuring his knee in Round 1 against Melbourne. He played three games in the WAFL, before returning to Fremantle's line-up in Round 13 against Gold Coast. He finished the season strongly playing the last nine consecutive games.

Pearce served as Fremantle's stand-in captain for a large portion of the 2022 AFL season, due to captain Nat Fyfe struggling with injury throughout the year. He finished the season having played an equal career-high 21 games. On 23 February 2023, Pearce was permanently appointed as Fremantle captain, succeeding Nat Fyfe.

Pearce played his first game as captain in the opening round of the 2023 AFL season against St Kilda, recording 20 disposals. He played his 100th game in Round 17 against Carlton at Optus Stadium. He was arguably Fremantle's best player in Round 20 during their seven-point win over Geelong at Kardinia Park, collecting 18 disposals, a game-high 15 intercepts, six rebound 50s, and leading all players for clearances with eight. He finished the game polling a perfect ten coaches' votes and received a maximum three Brownlow votes. Pearce finished the season having played every game.

=== 2024 ===
Pearce started the 2024 AFL season in excellent form with his ability to shut down some of the league's most dangerous forwards. He captained the Dockers to just their third three-nil start in the club's history, and was labeled the best key defender in the competition by Port Adelaide coach Ken Hinkley in Round 5, following Fremantle's narrow loss to Port Adelaide during their two-week stint in Adelaide. His career-best form led to media speculation he could be inline for All-Australian honours at the end of the season.

The eleventh round saw Fremantle face Collingwood at Optus Stadium. The match would turn out to be a see-sawing affair, with Fremantle dominating early before succumbing to a 25-point deficit with seven minutes left in the final quarter. However, the Dockers would mount an unlikely comeback and in the final minutes of the game, with Collingwood leading by seven points, Pearce was switched forward in a last-gasp effort. He made an immediate impact marking 25 metres out before kicking a captain's goal to secure a draw for Fremantle. in Round 15 against the Gold Coast Suns, Pearce injured his forearm in a marking contest, causing him to miss the next three games. He returned to the Dockers line-up for their annual Starlight Purple Haze fundraiser game in Round 19 against Melbourne at Optus Stadium. Unfortunately, he reinjured the same arm during the match and missed the rest of the season.

=== 2025 ===
Pearce managed 16 games for the 2025 AFL season, captaining the Dockers to a sixth-place finish on the ladder. Pearce made a memorable impact in Round 22 against Port Adelaide. In similar circumstances to his goal against Collingwood the year prior, with scores level, Pearce switched forward in the final minute of the match; he took a big pack mark 20 metres out before kicking a captain's goal to win the game by six points.

=== 2026 ===
In Round 4 of the 2026 AFL season against Adelaide at Adelaide Oval, Pearce laid a last-minute smother on Adelaide player James Peatling's attempted kick on goal to help win the game by 2 points. After the game, Pearce was swarmed by his teammates and praised by Fox Footy commentators Ken Hinkley and Dwayne Russell. Pearce played 20 games for the home-and-away season, captaining the Dockers to a first-place finish on the ladder to claim just their second minor premiership in club history, with a 19–4 win–loss record. He also received his first All-Australian selection, being named in the initial 46-man All-Australian squad.

== Personal life ==
He attended secondary school Ulverstone High School (now Ulverstone Secondary College). He competed his final two years of school at Don College.

Pearce is currently studying a Bachelor of Arts (Psychology) at Deakin University. In 2021, Pearce was named as Deakin University's Indigenous Sportsperson of the Year.

== Honours & Achievements ==
Team

- 2x AFL minor premiership (Fremantle) 2015, 2026
- McClelland Trophy (Fremantle): 2015

Individual

- Beacon Award: 2015
- Fremantle captain: 2023–
- 3× Fremantle Players' Award: 2024, 2025, 2026

== Statistics ==
Updated to the end of round 22, 2026.

Legend
G	Goals	K	Kicks	D	Disposals	T	Tackles
B	Behinds	H	Handballs	M	Marks

Season	Team	No.	Games	Totals							Averages (per game)							Votes
Season	Team	No.	Games	G	B	K	H	D	M	T	G	B	K	H	D	M	T	Votes
2014	Fremantle	25	0	—	—	—	—	—	—	—	—	—	—	—	—	—	—	0
2015	Fremantle	25	13	3	3	73	65	138	50	20	0.2	0.2	5.6	5.0	10.6	3.8	1.5	0
2016	Fremantle	25	8	0	1	36	41	77	20	17	0.0	0.1	4.5	5.1	9.6	2.5	2.1	0
2017	Fremantle	25	0	—	—	—	—	—	—	—	—	—	—	—	—	—	—	0
2018	Fremantle	25	21	0	0	109	118	227	72	36	0.0	0.0	5.2	5.6	10.8	3.4	1.7	0
2019	Fremantle	25	11	0	0	56	63	119	36	24	0.0	0.0	5.1	5.7	10.8	3.3	2.2	0
2020 (Note: The 2020 season was played with 17 home-and-away matches per team (down from 22) and 16-minute quarters with time on (down from 20-minute quarters with time on) due to the impact of the COVID-19 pandemic.)	Fremantle	25	0	—	—	—	—	—	—	—	—	—	—	—	—	—	—	0
2021	Fremantle	25	10	0	1	56	40	96	27	10	0.0	0.1	5.6	4.0	9.6	2.7	1.0	0
2022	Fremantle	25	21	1	0	154	76	230	90	25	0.0	0.0	7.3	3.6	11.0	4.3	1.2	1
2023	Fremantle	25	23	0	0	134	96	230	90	49	0.0	0.0	5.8	4.2	10.0	3.9	2.1	3
2024	Fremantle	25	15	1	0	95	81	176	68	25	0.1	0.0	6.3	5.4	11.7	4.5	1.7	2
2025	Fremantle	25	16	4	0	101	76	177	79	20	0.3	0.0	6.3	4.8	11.1	4.9	1.3	2
2026	Fremantle	25	18	0	0	83	75	158	70	18	0.0	0.0	4.6	4.2	8.8	3.9	1.0	0
Career			156	9	5	897	731	1628	602	244	0.1	0.0	5.8	4.7	10.4	3.9	1.6	8
