= Deadly Awards 1997 =

Australian Aboriginal and Torres Strait Islander annual music awards

Winners of the Deadly Awards 1997.The awards were an annual celebration of Australian Aboriginal and Torres Strait Islander achievement in music, sport, entertainment and community.

== Music ==
- Outstanding Contribution to Aboriginal Music: Jimmy Little
- Most Promising New Talent: Aim 4 More
- Male Artist of the Year: Archie Roach
- Female Artist of the Year: Maroochy Barambah
- Single Release of the Year: Ignorance Is Bliss, Tiddas
- Album Release of the Year: True Believer, Troy Cassar-Daley
- Band of the Year: Yothu Yindi

== Arts ==
- Excellence in Film or Theatrical Score: Fish by David Page

== Community ==
- Aboriginal Broadcaster of the Year: Tiga Bayles, Radio 4AAA
