= No Way to Forget =

- Directed by: Richard Frankland
- Written by: Richard Frankland
- Produced by: John Foss
- Starring: David Ngoombujarra; Christina Saunders; Shane Franzis
- Distributed by: Golden Seahorse Productions
- Release date: 1996
- Running time: 12 minutes
- Country: Australia
- Language: English

No Way to Forget is an Australian short film. It is written and directed by Richard Frankland, produced by John Foss and stars David Ngoombujarra in the lead role of Shane Francis.

It is the first film by an Indigenous director to win an AFI Award in 1996 and it won in three fields. It screened at the 1996 Cannes Film Festival in the category of Un Certain Regard.

No Way to Forget is based on Frankland's experiences while working as a Field Officer for the Royal Commission into Aboriginal Deaths in Custody.

It was broadcast nationally on SBS TV.

== Awards ==
- AFI Award (1996) – Best Short Film
- AFI Award (1996) – Best Screenplay in a Short Film
- AFI Award (1996) – Best Sound in a Documentary
- Cannes International Film Festival (1996) – Un Certain Regard
- St Kilda Film Festival (2000) – Best New Director
