= Kirk Page =

Australian actor and dancer

- Occupations: Actor, theatre director
- Notable work: Redfern Now
- Children: 2

Kirk Page is an Australian dancer, singer, actor of stage and screen, movement director, and theatre director. As of 2024 he is associate director of Northern Rivers Performing Arts (NORPA) in Lismore, New South Wales.

== Early life and education ==
Kirk Page is of Mulandjali, Badu Island (Torres Strait Islander), German, and Welsh descent. He is the cousin of Stephen, David, and Russell Page.

He grew up in South East Queensland.

Page was working in a factory when he was accepted into NAISDA, and in 1994 he moved to Sydney to start his career, training as a dancer and performer at the college.

== Career ==
Page is known for his physical theatre, dance, and aerial work. He has developed his skills as a performer as well as movement director, and has started developing his own work. He has worked in film, television, and theatre as a movement director.

=== Stage and events ===
Page was only 20 when he joined Bangarra Dance Theatre, which he says changed his life. He received training by Bernadette Walong-Sene, and understudied many of the roles in their performances. He did some backup vocals with Christine Anu, and in Ochres partnered with Frances Rings (later artistic director of Bangarra), Gina Rings, and Marilyn Miller. He performed in an international tour of Ochres in 1995, Earthdancer in 2005, and in Wudjang: Not the Past in 2022, As part of Bangarra, he also participated in the 1996 Summer Olympics closing ceremony in Atlanta, Georgia.

Page performed in A Midsummer Night's Dream for Opera Australia, and did acrobatics in many productions for Legs on the Wall, including Eora Crossing and Runners Up.

In musical theatre, Page appeared in Corrugation Road for Black Swan Theatre Company in the late 1990s; The Sunshine Club for Sydney Theatre Company (STC) in 2000; and Priscilla, Queen of the Desert for Back Row Productions in 2007-8.

He appeared in the STC's all-Indigenous production of A Midsummer Night's Dream in 1997, staged as part of the Festival of the Dreaming and directed by Noel Tovey. He also appeared in Belvoir's Coronation Road and The Dreamers. In 2003 he acted with Company B Belvoir alongside Wayne Blair, Luke Carroll, Elaine Crombie, her mother Lillian Crombie, and Vic Simms in Conversations with the Dead, written by Richard J Frankland and directed by Wesley Enoch. The subject matter referred suicide and Aboriginal deaths in custody, of which some of the actors, including Page, had had personal experience.

He choreographed some of the Indigenous segment of the 2006 Commonwealth Games opening ceremony in Melbourne, called My Skin, My Life, which was directed by Wesley Enoch.

In 2009 he played the tracker in the 2009 stage adaptation of One Night the Moon. by Malthouse Theatre.

In January 2012 he took part in two productions for the Wominjeka Festival at the Footscray Community Arts Centre: Hunted, with the resident theatre company Brown Cabs, and in the "Black Screen" program. In March 2012 he was assistant director for Bloodland, a co-production of Sydney Theatre Company and Bangarra for the Adelaide Festival, at the Dunstan Playhouse in Adelaide.

In 2013 he participated in dance company Force Majeure's "Cultivate" program to help develop his choreography skills.

In other stage work, he appeared in My Lover's Bones at the 2014 Melbourne Festival; and in crime thriller play The Demon in 2022.

Page played Cuddlepie in Snugglepot and Cuddlepie (based on the book by May Gibbs) in July 2015 and toured nationally with the show in 2016.

=== NORPA ===
In February 2017, Page was appointed associate director of Northern Rivers Performing Arts (NORPA) in Lismore, where the artistic director was Julian Louis. The position was created with the support of Arts NSW. The role includes running the community engagement program, in particular a series of dance workshops for Indigenous young people. He was also tasked with using studio space at Lismore City Hall for workshops and developing new works, including providing for artists in residence.

One of his first assignments was to further develop the Three Brothers project, which had been under development since 2013. The story is based on a Bundjalung creation story involving three brothers. The project had been devised by Rhoda Roberts and Julian Louis, who would co-direct, and the creative team included Page, Romaine Moreton, Tibian Wyles, Djon Mundine, Guy Simon, and Mitch King. Other contributing artists included choreographer Frances Rings, writer Melissa Lucashenko, and performers Billy McPherson, Thomas E S Kelly, and Damion Hunter. David Page (a cousin of Kirk Page), who had been also involved in the project, died in 2016, which had a significant impact on the rest of the crew. The Three Brothers project developed into Djurra, which was presented in November 2017 as a performance of dance, song, storytelling, and imagery. The performance tells the story of three Bundjalung brothers growing up in a small town, and examines family relationships, generational trauma, and other issues affecting Aboriginal people.

In late August 2024, Page directed a play by Rhoda Roberts, My Cousin Frank, with NORPA in Lismore and Byron Bay. It is about her cousin Frank Roberts, a boxer who was the Aboriginal Australian to participate in the Olympics, at Tokyo in 1964. Roberts narrates the story of "a family's journey from the tumultuous era of dispersal and silence to navigating a world controlled by government policy". Page talked about the play on the Awaye! program on ABC Radio National.

=== Film and TV ===
Page appeared in a short film called Shit Skin, released in 2002, opposite Freda Glynn.

In 2013 he featured in the first episode of the second season of the TV series Redfern Now, where he played Peter, who is fighting for custody of his daughter after the death of his partner. On screen he also appeared in five episodes of season 2 of Mystery Road in 2020.

Other film and TV credits include in children's TV series My Place and the film of Bran Nue Dae (2009).

=== Mentoring ===
Page mentored young people at the PACT Centre for Emerging Artists.

In 2014, he participated in "Rekindling", a youth dance program run by Bangarra with the aim of connecting Aboriginal teenagers in regional areas with their culture, and encourage them to develop any skills they may have in the performing or other arts. As part of this, he visited Lismore several times.

== Recognition and awards ==
For his performance in Redfern Now, Page was nominated for the Most Outstanding Actor in the 2014 Logie Awards.

Both Redfern Now and Mystery Road won an Equity Award for Most Outstanding Performance by an Ensemble in a Drama Series.

== Personal life ==
Page He had a brother, who took his own life around 2002.

He has two daughters.

He was living in Sydney before moving to the Northern Rivers to fill the role at NORPA.
