= Tiddas (band) =

Australian folk band

- Origin: Victoria, Australia
- Genre: Folk
- Years active: 1990–2000, 2018
- Labels: Polygram; Mercury Music; Festival Music
- Members: Amy Saunders; Lou Bennett; Sally Dastey

Tiddas were an Australian all-female folk trio from Victoria.

== History ==
=== 1990–1992: Career beginnings and Inside My Kitchen ===
Originally the three women, Amy Saunders (a Gunditjmara woman from Portland), Lou Bennett (a Yorta Yorta Dja Dja Wurrung woman from Echuca) and Sally Dastey (from West Heidelberg) combined their vocal talents as backing singers for Aboriginal band Djaambi, led by Saunders' brother Richard Frankland in 1990. The group were invited to perform at a musical celebration for women's artistic achievement, 'Hot Jam Cooking', in Richmond, Victoria. Their performance was well received and inspired Ruby Hunter to dub the trio Tiddas, which is Koori for the "sisters".

After performing together for over a year the band came to the attention of Paul Petran, host of ABC National Radio show 'Music Deli', who assisted Tiddas to record their debut EP, Inside My Kitchen in 1991. Inside My Kitchen was released in October 1992 and received two nominations, for ARIA Award for Best New Talent and ARIA Award for Best Indigenous Release, at the ARIA Music Awards of 1993. The single peaked at number 145 on the ARIA charts.

=== 1993–1997: Sing About Life and Tiddas ===
Tiddas quickly became live favourites, touring with Sweet Honey in the Rock and Midnight Oil, adding didgeridoo player Tim "Froggie" Holtze for their first studio album Sing About Life which was released in November 1993. The album peaked at No. 36 on the ARIA charts, achieved gold record sales in Australia (35,000 copies sold), was nominated 'Breakthrough Artist – Album', and won 'Best Indigenous Record' at the ARIA Music Awards of 1994. National and international tours followed, including several WOMAD concerts. Sing About Life was released in the United States in September 1995, spurring tours of North America and Europe.

The group's second studio album was produced by Joe Camilleri titled Tiddas and was released in Australia in August 1996 reaching No. 26 on the ARIA charts. The album was nominated for 'Best Indigenous Release' at the ARIA Music Awards of 1997. The first single, "Ignorance is Bliss", was reputedly inspired by an argument with Bob Geldof while touring in 1993. Backing musicians on the album included the Black Sorrows' Jen Anderson on violin, Joe Camilleri on sax (on "Waving Goodbye"), Peter Luscombe on drums, Steve Hadley on bass, and Weddings, Parties, Anything's Mark "Squeezebox Wally" Wallace on piano accordion. A second single "Walk Alone" was released in 1997.

=== 1998–2000: Lethal By the Kilo, Show Us Ya Tiddas and split ===
In 1998, the girls sang on "Yil Lull" which was released as Singers For The Red Black & Gold. The third studio album, Lethal By the Kilo, was recorded in Melbourne's ABC studios in late 1998. The album received almost no promotion from the record company and failed to chart. On 11 September 1999, Tiddas recorded a live performance at Continental Café which was released as Show Us Ya Tiddas later in 1999.

In May 2000 Tiddas announced they were to break up, and spent months on a national tour to say farewell to their fans. In 2000 Tiddas were awarded a Deadly Award for 'Outstanding Contribution to Aboriginal Music'.

=== 2018: Reformation and NIMA Hall of Fame ===
In 2018, the trio announced they were reuniting for a one-off national tour to celebrate the release of Archie Roach's "lost" album, Dancing with My Spirit, which was recorded in the 1990s and released in April 2018.

In August 2019, Tiddas were inducted into the National Indigenous Music Awards Hall of Fame.

== Members ==
- Sally Dastey
- Amy Saunders
- Lou Bennett

== Discography ==
=== Studio albums ===
List of studio albums, with selected details and chart positions
Title	Album details	Peak chart positions
Title	Album details	AUS
Sing About Life	Released: November 1993; Label: Polygram (518 3482); Formats: CD, Cassette	36
Tiddas	Released: 5 August 1996; Label: Black Pig/Polygram (532799-2); Formats: CD	26
Lethal By the Kilo	Released: September 1998; Label: Mercury Music (538 277-2); Formats: CD	192

=== Live albums ===
List of live albums, with selected chart positions
Title	Album details
Show Us Ya Tiddas	Released: 1999; Label: Festival Music (23768185); Formats: CD

=== Extended plays ===
List of extended plays, with selected details and chart positions
Title	EP details	Peak chart positions
Title	EP details	AUS
Inside My Kitchen	Released: October 1992; Label: Black Heart Music (ID 0002-2); Formats: CD	193

=== Singles ===
List of singles, with selected chart positions
Title	Year	Peak chart positions	Album
Title	Year	AUS	Album
"Inside My Kitchen"	1992	145	Inside My Kitchen
"Waiting"	1993	88	Sing About Life
"Real World"	1994	148	Sing About Life
"Changing Times"	1995	148	Sing About Life
"Ignorance is Bliss"	1996	97	Tiddas
"Walk Alone"	1997	—	Tiddas
"Yil Lull" (as Singers For The Red Black & Gold)	1998	—	non-album single

== Awards and nominations ==
=== ARIA Awards ===
The ARIA Music Awards are a set of annual ceremonies presented by Australian Recording Industry Association (ARIA), which recognise excellence, innovation, and achievement across all genres of the music of Australia. They commenced in 1987. Tiddas has received one ARIA Music Awards from six nominations

Year	Nominee / work	Award	Result
1993	Inside My Kitchen	Best New Talent	Nominated
1993	Inside My Kitchen	Best Indigenous Release	Nominated
1994	Sing About Life	Best Indigenous Release	Won
1994	Sing About Life	Breakthrough Artist - Album	Nominated
1995	"Changing Times"	Best Indigenous Release	
1997	Tiddas	Best Indigenous Release	Nominated

=== Australian Women in Music Awards ===
The Australian Women in Music Awards is an annual event that celebrates outstanding women in the Australian Music Industry who have made significant and lasting contributions in their chosen field. They commenced in 2018.

Year	Nominee / work	Award	Result
2018	Tiddas	Auriel Andrew Memorial Award	Nominated

=== Deadly Awards ===
The Deadly Awards, (commonly known simply as The Deadlys), was an annual celebration of Australian Aboriginal and Torres Strait Islander achievement in music, sport, entertainment and community. They ran from 1996 to 2013.

Year	Nominee / work	Award	Result
1996	"Themselves"	Band of the Year	Won
1997	"Ignorance is Bliss"	Single Release of the Year	Won
1999	"My Island Home" (with Alister Jones)	Excellence in Film or Theatrical Score	Won
2000	"Themselves"	Outstanding Contribution to Music	Won

=== National Indigenous Music Awards ===
The National Indigenous Music Awards (NIMA) recognise excellence, dedication, innovation and outstanding contribution to the Northern Territory music industry. They commenced in 2004.

Year	Nominee / work	Award	Result
2019	Themselves	Hall of Fame Inductee	Inductee
