= Mannalargenna =

Aboriginal Tasmanian leader and warrior

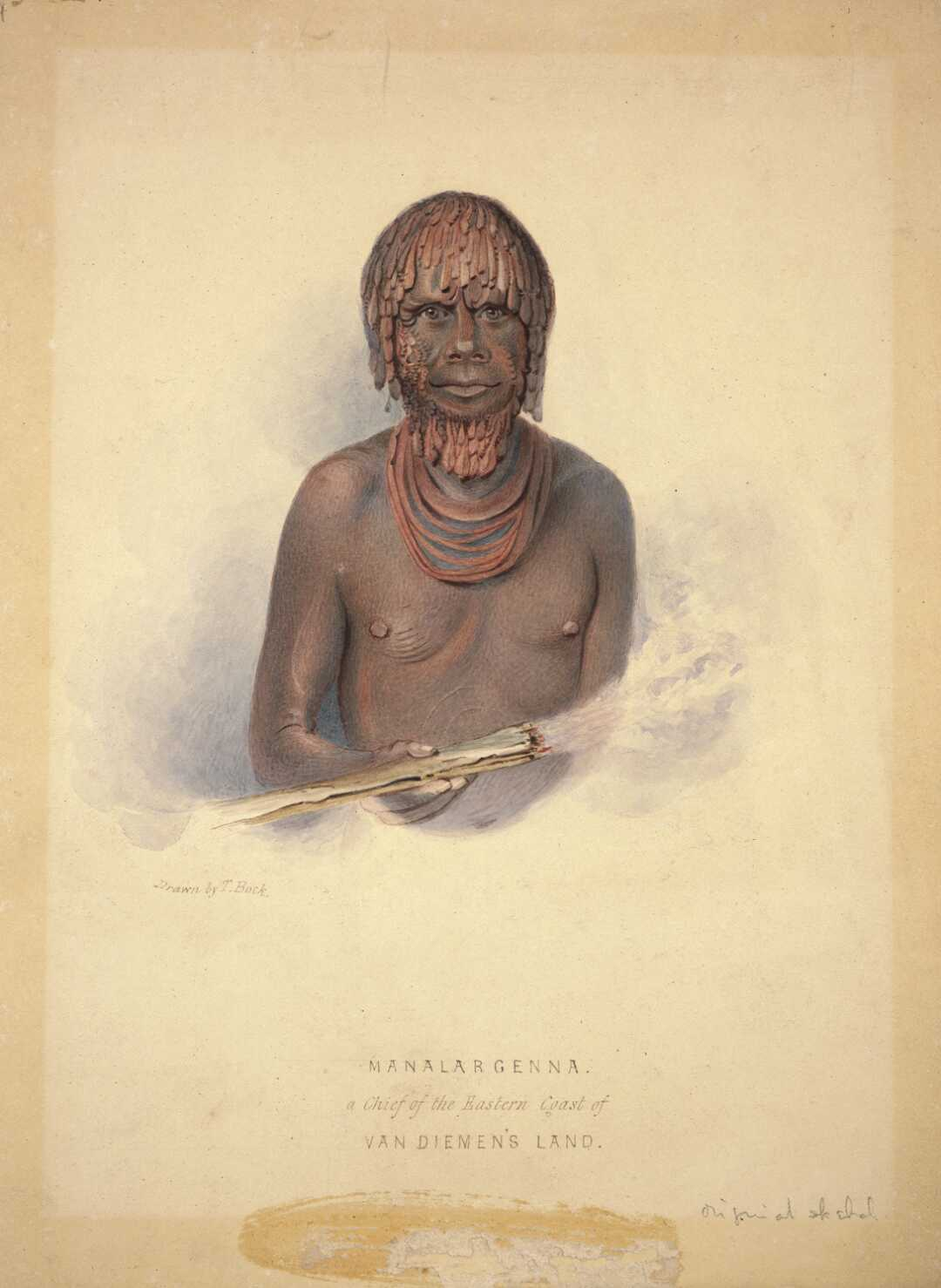
- Born: c. 1770; Tasmania
- Died: 1835; Wybalenna, Tasmania
- Known for: Leader of Tasmanian Aboriginal groups before and during colonisation
- Spouse(s): Unknown (deceased), Tanleboneyer (deceased)

Mannalargenna, also spelt Manalakina (c.1770–1835), was an Aboriginal Tasmanian leader and warrior.

== Biography ==
Mannalargenna was a Chief of the Trawlwoolway clan in what is now the North East Nation. He is described as being 5' 8" and wearing grease and red ochre all over his body. Following the arrival of British in the area, he led a series of guerrilla-style attacks against British settlers in the colony of Van Diemen's Land during the period known as the Black War. In 1829, he freed four Native women and a boy from John Batman's house where they had been held for a year.

While it seems as though he joined George Robinson's mission to persuade Native people to "surrender", it is claimed that he was actually directing Robinson away from the people. He was promised that if he helped Robinson he would not be sent to Flinders Island. However, this promise was broken, and he died in captivity at Wybalenna in 1835. When he arrived at Big Green Island in 1835, Mannalargenna symbolically cut off his ochred hair and beard.

== Family ==
Mannalargenna had two wives. His first wife's name is unknown, but together they had at least six children: a son, Neerhepeererminer, and daughters Nellenooremer, Woretemoeteryenner, Wottecowidyer, Wobbelty and Teekoolterme. His second wife was Tanleboneyer, with whom he had no children. She was one of George Robinson's early guides.

Uncle Jack Charles (1943–2022) was his five times great-grandson, via his daughter Woretemoeteyenner (1797–1847). Australian rules football player Alex Pearce, born in 1995, is also a descendant.

== Recognition and legacy ==
"Mannalergenna Day" has been celebrated in early December in Little Musselroe Bay in Tasmania since 2015, in commemoration of Mannalargenna and for celebrating Palawa or Pakana culture.

There is a monument to Mannalargenna at Wybalenna Mission Site Cemetery.

A sketch of Mannalargenna by artist Thomas Bock is held in the British Museum in London, England.

During the 19th century, George Augustus Robinson had also collected a word list of his native language.

== See also ==
- Dolly Dalrymple
- List of Indigenous Australian historical figures
