= Richard Frankland =

Indigenous Australian playwright and musician

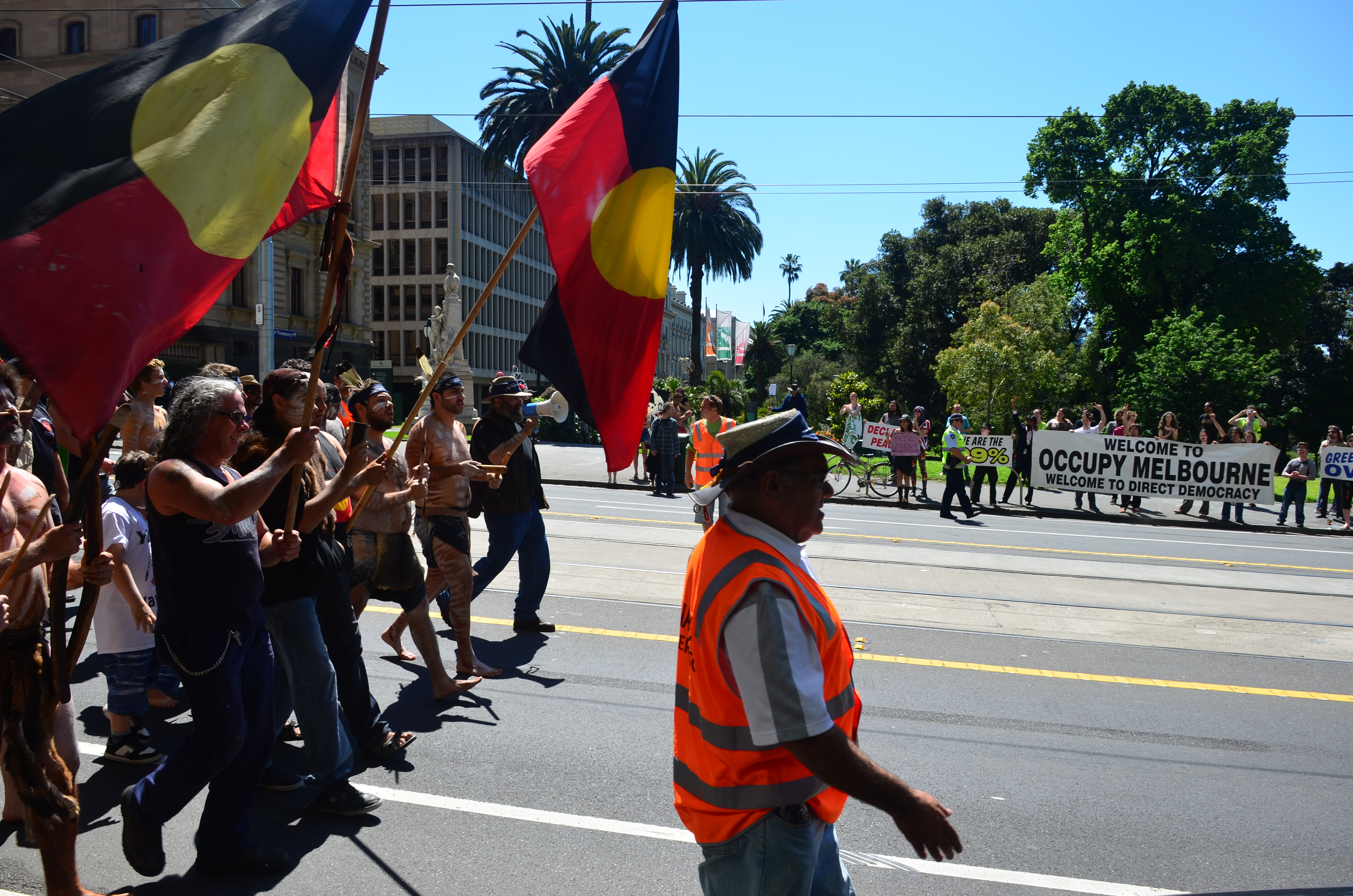
Richard Frankland (with megaphone) at the Thousand Warrior march passing Occupy Melbourne in Treasury Gardens, 5 November 2011

Richard Joseph Frankland is an Australian playwright, scriptwriter and musician. He is an Aboriginal Australian of Gunditjmara origin from Victoria. He has worked significantly for Aboriginal Australian causes.

== Early life ==
Richard Joseph Frankland was born in Melbourne, but grew up mainly on the coast in south-west Victoria. He is a Gunditjmara man.

== Career ==
Frankland worked as a soldier, a fisherman, and as a field officer to the Royal Commission into Aboriginal Deaths in Custody (RCIADIC), which ran from 1987 until its final report was issued in 1991. His experience with RCIADIC inspired him to write several plays, including No Way to Forget, Who Killed Malcolm Smith, and Conversations with the Dead.

Frankland won an AFI Award for Best Screenplay in a Short for his 1996 short film No Way to Forget. It was the first film by an Indigenous director to win an AFI Award. It screened at the 1996 Cannes Film Festival in the category of Un Certain Regard, and was broadcast nationally in Australia on SBS TV.

He wrote and directed Harry's War (1999), a feature film based on his uncle's role in World War II on the Kokoda Trail. The film was screened at the British War Memorial in London and won Best Short Film at Spike Lee's alternative Oscars for black film-makers in Hollywood.

His 2002 play, Conversations with the Dead, was staged in 2003 by Company B Belvoir, directed by Wesley Enoch and featuring Wayne Blair, Luke Carroll, Kirk Page, Elaine Crombie, her mother Lillian Crombie, and Vic Simms. In 2004, the play was performed at the United Nations.

=== Music ===
Frankland is also a musician, whose music features on the soundtracks to many of his films. In 1992 his first band Djaambi supported Prince on his Australian tour. He formed The Charcoal Club in 1990, with a number of Indigenous and non-Indigenous members. They released three albums on CD: The Charcoal Club (2002), Cry Freedom (2005) and Hearts Full of Rust (2010).

== Other activities ==
In the early nineties he founded Mirimbiak Nations Aboriginal Corporation (MNAC) which was the first Indigenous statewide land organisation in some 25 years. MNAC was responsible for representing traditional owners and lodging all native title claims throughout the state of Victoria (excepting the already lodged Yorta Yorta, claim but including the recently successful Gunditjmara claim). Richard was also instrumental in forming Defenders of Native Title (DONT), which later became Australians for Native Title and Reconciliation (ANTAR).

In 2004, he helped form the Your Voice political party, after the abolition of ATSIC, saying,

It's time that we as Indigenous Australians put the onus of equity back on non-Indigenous Australians and ask them straight out, 'Is this a racist society? Would you like to see Indigenous Australians in the halls of Parliament? Do you believe in an equitable voice in this society? With the abolition of ATSIC, Aboriginal people now have no voice. We have no point of political dialogue.

— Richard Frankland

== Academia ==
Frankland served as Head of the Wilin Centre for Indigenous Arts and Cultural Development at the University of Melbourne, and in 2015 was appointed as an Associate Professor in Cross-Disciplinary Practice in the Division of Fine Arts and Music at the Victorian College of the Arts.

== Bibliography ==
=== Plays ===
- Conversations with the Dead (2002)
- Walkabout (2005)

=== Films ===
- Who Killed Malcolm Smith
- No Way to Forget (1996)
- After Mabo – The Amendments
- Harry's War (1999)
- Stone Bros. (2009)

=== Books ===
- Frankland, Richard (2007). Digger J Jones : Holy Snapping Duckpoo. Gosford, New South Wales: Scholastic Press. ISBN 978-1-86504-856-7.

=== Poem ===
- Two World One, this poem explores themes of Indigenous Australian identity, dual heritage and the difficulties in navigating two worlds and it is included in several anthologies including the Anthology of Australian Aboriginal literature (2008).

== Discography ==
- Down Three Waterholes Road – Larrikin (1997)
- Dingo's Brekky Richard Frankland and the New Senate – Blackhorn Productions (2000)
- The Charcoal Club: Meeting One The Charcoal Club – Taram Records(2002)
- Cry Freedom: Meeting Two The Charcoal Club – Taram Records (2005)

== Awards and nominations ==
- 2008 – Roz Bower Awards (Australia Council) – Awarded to Richard for his innovative leadership and significant artistic contributions, which have focused on reconciliation and social justice.
- 2007 – 'Winner Outstanding Achievement' – Deadly Awards – The Circuit
- 2006 – 'Band of The Year' (nominee) – Deadly Awards – Charcoal Club Band
- 2004 – Uncle Jackie Charles Award – Awarded to Richard Frankland for services to Indigenous Theatre – Ilbijerri Theatre Company
- 2000 – 'Best Short Film' – St Tropez Film Festival – Harry's War
- 2000 – 'Best Short Film'/'3rd Most Popular Film Overall' – Black Filmmakers Hall of Fame (US) – Harry's War
- 2000 – 'Best Short Film' – Atom Awards – Harry's War
- 2000 – 'Best Screenplay', 'Open Craft Award' (David Ngoombujarra) – St Kilda Film Festival – Harry's War
- 2000 – 'Best International Short Film' (Jury Award) – Hollywood Black Film Festival – Harry's War
- 2000 – 'Best Australian Short Film' – Flickerfest – Harry's War
- 1999 – 'Best Short Australian Film promoting Human Values' – Melbourne International Film Festival – Harry's War
- 1998 – 'Best Visual Design (editing)' – Australian Film Institute Awards – After Mabo
- 1997 – 'Best Film' – Bathurst Film Festival – No Way to Forget
- 1997 – Invitation to participate in Australian Retrospective – Denver International Film Festival – No Way to forget Denver, USA
- 1996 – 'Best Short Film', 'Best Sound in a Short Film' – Australian Film Institute Awards – No Way to Forget
- 1996 – 'Best New Director' – Richard Frankland – St Kilda Film Festival – No Way to Forget
- 1993 – 'Best Documentary' – Australian Film Institute Awards – Who Killed Malcolm Smith
