= Woretemoeteryenner =

Tasmanian Aboriginal woman, sealer and pioneering traveller

Woretemoeteryenner (c. 1795 – 13 October 1847), also known as "Bung", "Pung", "Maria" and "Margaret", was an Aboriginal Tasmanian woman who was taken from her family and had children with George Briggs, an English convict and sealer. She worked as a sealer and kangaroo hunter in the Bass Strait and on Kangaroo Island and was sold on to other sealers. She was one of five Aboriginal Tasmanian women who were taken to harvest seals at Île Saint-Paul in the southern Indian Ocean, and were later abandoned at Rodriguez Island near Mauritius. Upon being returned to Van Diemen's Land, Woretemoeteryenner became part of George Augustus Robinson's "friendly mission" to round up all the remaining Aboriginal Tasmanians. She, along with the other surviving Aboriginal Tasmanians, was placed into exile at the Wybalenna Aboriginal Establishment on Flinders Island. In 1841, Woretemoeteryenner was allowed to leave Wybalenna and live with her daughter's family near Perth, Tasmania where she died in 1847.

Woretemoeteryenner and her sisters are among the few Indigenous Tasmanian people whose lives bridge the experience of Aboriginal people before and after British colonisation. She is the ancestor of many of today’s Tasmanian Aboriginal people.

== Early life ==
Woretemoeteryenner was born in the Cape Portland area of Van Diemen's Land (Tasmania). She was a member of the Cape Portland Tasmanian tribe, one of the nine Aboriginal nations in what is now Tasmania. Her father Mannalargenna was a leader of the Cape Portland Tasmanians. She had three sisters: Wapperty (Wobberrertee), Wottecowidyer, and Teekoolterme. Woretemoeteryenner and her sisters are among the few Aboriginal Tasmanians whose lives bridge the experience of Aboriginal people before and after European contact on the island.

== Arrival of the British ==
The life of the Aboriginal Tasmanians changed significantly after the late 1790s when the British began to colonise the region. The first capitalist industry to exploit the resources in Woretemoeteryenner's homeland was the hunting of seals for skins and oil. Approximately two hundred European men came to the Bass Strait islands in the early 1800s to work as sealers. Some of them abducted Aboriginal women to be used as workers or concubines in slave-like conditions. In 1803 and 1804, the first British settlements were formed at Risdon Cove and Port Dalrymple, respectively.

=== Taken by George Briggs ===
George Briggs, born in England, came to what is now Australia in 1805 when he was fourteen years of age. Briggs became a sealer. He took Woretemoeteryenner and they likely lived together beginning around 1810. Whether she was abducted by force by Briggs or if the relationship was made with Mannalargenna's approval is unclear. (Note: There are some sources, though that said that she was abducted by Briggs.) She was later referred to as "Mrs. Briggs" by Colonial officials and on her death certificate.

Woretemoeteryenner gave birth to her children on the Bass Strait islands. She had a daughter named Dalrymple (Dolly) about 1812. She had three more daughters: Eliza, Mary (also known as Margaret), and an unnamed daughter, born in 1817, 1818 and 1819, respectively, who all died young. The unnamed daughter was killed during an attack by a group of Aboriginal people. A son named John was born in 1820. (Note: When Dolly was seven she lived with Dr. Jacob Mountgarrett and his family. Dolly had eleven children with her husband, Thomas Johnson, whose descendants lived primarily in north-west Tasmania. In 1853, John married Louisa Strugnell, an Aboriginal women. They lived in Victoria at the Coranderrk Aboriginal station, near Healesville. They had eight children who reached adulthood. John and Louisa's descendants have lived mostly in New South Wales and Victoria.)

Woretemoeteryenner was sold by Briggs to another sealer for a guinea sometime after 1820.

== Sealing in the Indian Ocean ==
Woretemoeteryenner became an experienced sealer but by 1820, most of the seals had been hunted out at the Furneaux Group of the Bass Strait islands and it was needed to travel farther to find seals to hunt. Woretemoeteryenner and four other Tasmanian Aboriginal women, being at this stage the property of the sealer Thomas Taylor, were boarded onto boats to go to the remote Île Amsterdam and Île Saint-Paul islands in the southern Indian Ocean. After harvesting seals here, these Aboriginal women and their children were left by the ship's captain at Rodriguez Island. Abandoned, the group were eventually picked up and transported to the nearby island of Mauritius. Woretemoeteryenner lived at Rodrigues and Mauritius from 1826 to 1827 and learned to communicate in French. Woretemoeteryenner was one of three women who survived the ordeal and was repatriated in the latter half of 1827.

== Wybalenna ==
Upon returning to Van Diemen's Land, Woretemoeteryenner again lived with the sealers on the Bass Strait Islands. In 1830, she was removed from these men by George Augustus Robinson and became part of his "friendly mission" to round up all the remaining Indigenous Tasmanians. In 1833, she was exiled with the surviving Aboriginal people at the Wybalenna Aboriginal Establishment on Flinders Island where she was given the name "Margaret".

== Permitted to live in British society ==
In 1841, Woretemoeteryenner's daughter, Dolly Briggs, who was married to and living with a British settler named Thomas Johnson at Perth, Tasmania, requested that her mother be allowed to leave the terrible conditions at Wybalenna and live with her and her husband. The request was approved and in a highly unusual circumstance, Woretemoeteryenner was permitted to leave Wybalenna and live in the relative freedom of British colonial society, albeit mostly confined to her daughter's residence where she was a loving grandmother to her grandchildren.

== Death ==
She died at Perth, Tasmania on 13 October 1847.

== See also ==
- List of Indigenous Australian historical figures
