= Harry's War (1999 film) =

- Directed by: Richard Frankland
- Written by: Richard Frankland
- Produced by: John Foss; Richard Franklin
- Starring: David Ngoombujarra
- Cinematography: Peter Zakharov
- Edited by: Jill Bilcock
- Distributed by: Golden Seahorse Productions
- Release date: 1999
- Running time: 28 minutes
- Country: Australia
- Language: English

Harry's War is an Australian short film. It is written and directed by Richard Frankland produced by John Foss and Richard Franklin and stars David Ngoombujarra. It was broadcast nationally on SBS and ABC TV.

Harry's War is based on Frankland's Uncle, Harry Saunders (brother of Reg Saunders), who fought for Australia in the South Pacific in World War Two, and was killed in 1942. Saunders fought for his country in the hope that his actions would help Aboriginal people gain citizenship.

== Awards ==
- AFI Award (1999) - Best Screenplay in a Short Film (nominated)
- Melbourne International Film Festival (1999) - OCIC Award
- Hollywood Black Film Festival (2000) - Jury Prize for Best Short Film
- St Kilda Film Festival (2000) - Best original Screenplay
- Atom Awards (2000) - Best Short Film
- Saint Tropez Film Festival (2000) - Best Short Film
