= Living Black =

- Presented by: Karla Grant
- Country of origin: Australia
- No. of series: 24 (as of 2017)

Production
- Running time: 30 minutes

Original release
- Network: SBS
- Release: 2003 – present

Living Black is a current affairs program aired on SBS, Australia, addressed primarily to the interests of Australia's indigenous community. Karla Grant has been executive producer of this program, which she developed, since 2002. She has also been fronting the show since 2004.

== Programming ==
The series began on SBS TV on 23 March 2003.

In 2010, the show aired on SBS with repeats airing during daytime programming during the week on SBS Viceland.

From 2013 the show screened on SBS and was repeated at a later time on National Indigenous Television (NITV) each week. From 2017, the show screened initially on NITV and was repeated at a later time on SBS. Over the years, in the Asia Pacific region, it has also aired on the ABC Australia.

== See also ==
- List of Australian television series
- List of programs broadcast by Special Broadcasting Service
