= Lou Bennett (Australian musician) =

Australian actress and musician

Lou Bennett AM
- Born: Cindy Louise Bennett; Echuca, Victoria, Australia
- Genres: Indigenous Australian, blues, country
- Occupations: Musician, singer-songwriter, actor, writer, artistic director
- Instruments: Vocals, guitar

Cindy Louise Bennett AM is an Indigenous Australian musician, actress and academic researching Aboriginal languages and their retrieval.

== Early life and education ==
Bennett is a Yorta Yorta and Dja Dja Wurrung woman born in Echuca, Victoria.

In October 2015 Bennett completed a PhD on Aboriginal language retrieval and reclamation at RMIT University. Her thesis was entitled "Sovereign Language Repatriation".

== Career ==
Bennett started her musical career with her uncle's band "The Shades", before later joining Richard Frankland's band "Djaambi", where she met Sally Dastey and Amy Saunders—Bennett, Dastey and Saunders later formed the Australian Recording Industry Association (ARIA) Award-winning band Tiddas.

After Tiddas disbanded in 2000, Bennett performed with a new band Sweet Cheeks and has worked as a stage actor—the latter has included an autobiographical show Show Us Your Tiddas!. Show Us Your Tiddas! follows Bennett's life as she recounts a series of stories that include the occasion when she revealed her sexuality to her family, her first live performance, moving into an urban environment and her time with Tiddas.

Bennett was a member of The Black Arm Band, for which she was an artistic director, composer, vocal supervisor and performer. This included directing, arranging, and performing in Dirtsong, both the world premiere at the 2009 Melbourne International Arts Festival and the second performance at the 2014 Adelaide Festival. The songs were written by Alexis Wright, with some in Aboriginal languages.

Bennett also contributed vocals to the 2012 Australian film The Sapphires, following her involvement with the 2004 Melbourne stage production.

== Honours and recognition ==
In 2017, Bennett was inducted onto the Victorian Honour Roll of Women. She was invited by the University of New England to give the 2018 Frank Archibald Memorial Lecture.

Her "significant service to the performing arts, particularly to music, and to the Indigenous community" was recognised by the award of Member of the Order of Australia (AM) in the 2019 Australia Day Honours. At the 2023 Art Music Awards the artist won Performance of the Year: Notated Composition for nyernur nyarkur (to see, to hear) as performed by Omega Ensemble and Lou Bennett.

== Theatre projects ==
- Magpie (2000) – Melbourne Workers Theatre
- Conversations with the Dead (2001) – Ilbijerri Theatre, Playbox, La Mama
- Yanagai! Yanagai! (2003) – Melbourne Workers Theatre, Playbox
- The Sapphires (2004) – Melbourne Theatre Company
- Show Us Your Tiddas! (2007) – Melbourne Workers Theatre
- Our Home Our Land (2011) – Boites 2009 Millennium Chorus
