= Ian Darling =

Australian filmmaker

Ian Darling AO
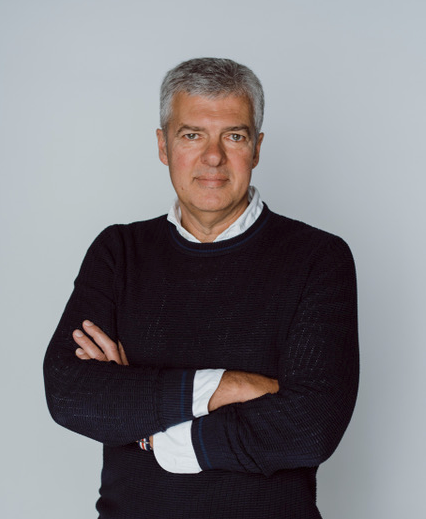
- Born: Melbourne, Victoria, Australia
- Occupations: Documentary Film Director; Producer

Ian David Darling AO is a documentary film director and producer.

He is the executive director of Shark Island Institute and its production arm, Shark Island Productions in Sydney, Australia.

His documentary producer and director credits include The Pool, The Twins, The Department, The Final Quarter, Paul Kelly - Stories of Me, The Oasis, Suzy & The Simple Man, Life After The Oasis, Polly and Me, The Soldier, In The Company of Actors, and Alone Across Australia. He is an executive producer of Wash My Soul in the River's Flow, Paper and Glue, On the Record, Woodstock for Capitalists, 2040, The Fourth Estate, The Bleeding Edge, Unrest, Inventing Tomorrow and How to Change the World.

He was founder of GoodPitch^{2} Australia which funded 19 films, including 2040, The Hunting Ground, That Sugar Film, Gayby Baby, Prison Songs, Frackman, Zach's Ceremony, The Opposition, Ghosthunter, Whiteley, Blue, The Leadership, and In My Blood It Runs.

Darling has been chair of The Caledonia Foundation since 2001, and was co-founder and managing director of the Caledonia Investments group from 1992 to 2004.

He is a member of the Impact Partners Advisory Board in New York, founder and patron (and former chair) of Documentary Australia, and Patron of the ArtsLab, Kangaroo Valley.

He was chair of the Sydney Theatre Company and the STC Foundation, from 2006 to 2010. He has been a director of the National Institute of Dramatic Art (NIDA), chair of The Oasis Youth Support Network, and member of The Salvation Army Advisory Board.

Darling received the Byron Kennedy Award for innovation and the relentless pursuit of excellence at the 2018 AACTA Awards.

Darling's photographs have been finalists in the Doug Moran National Portrait Prize, the National Photographic Portrait Prize, the Sydney Life Photography Prize and his portrait of Jon Muir was hung in "The Look" in 2019 and is now part of the permanent collection at the National Portrait Gallery in Canberra.

In 2021 Darling co-wrote and acted in The Twins with comedian Greg Fleet. The play opened at the 2021 Adelaide Fringe Festival and won the Mental Health Awareness Award. It went on to tour to Sydney, Kangaroo Valley, Canberra and Melbourne.

== Biography ==
Darling's first documentary in 2001 Woodstock for Capitalists was a film featuring investors and philanthropists Warren Buffett and Charlie Munger and won the CINE Golden Eagle Award. His next film in 2004 Alone Across Australia about extreme adventurer Jon Muir was voted one of the "20 best adventure films of all time" by Men's Journal Magazine and won over 32 international awards.

In The Company of Actors was a 2007 film that followed the journey of the Sydney Theatre Company cast of Hedda Gabler from rehearsal room in Sydney through to opening night in New York. The cast featured Cate Blanchett, Hugo Weaving and Robyn Nevin.

The Oasis was a multi-award-winning documentary that was filmed over two years about Australia's homeless youth. The film had a social and education outreach campaign which led to the most significant national inquiry into youth homelessness in 20 years. The Oasis was named one of "Australia's Top 50 Philanthropic Gifts of All Time". The Oasis became the inspiration to Darling filming two docu-dramas Polly and Me (a tale of child abuse and neglect, seen through the eyes of an 8-year-old girl), and Wall Boy (about a runaway forced into teenage prostitution and the courageous outreach worker who attempts to rescue him).

The Soldier was a documentary on Ken Depena, a devotee of the Salvation Army since 1949 who featured in The Oasis, the film garnered a 'Special Mention' at the Antenna Documentary Film Festival.

Paul Kelly - Stories of Me based on prominent Australian singer songwriter Paul Kelly opened at the Melbourne International Film Festival in 2012 and won the Film Critics Circle of Australia Best Documentary Award.

Stories From the Inside looked into a group of young first time offenders in Port Philip Prison. Suzy & The Simple Man an environmental love story featuring Suzy and Jon Muir, discusses sustainability and survival in a remote country community. The film premiered in 2016 at the Sydney Film Festival and had sold out screenings at Melbourne International Film Festival. Life After The Oasis re-connected with original participants from The Oasis ten years later, premiering in the Sydney Film Festival in 2019.

The Final Quarter (2019) re-examines the final three years of Sydney Swans footballer Adam Goodes’ playing career. Made entirely from archival footage, photos and interviews sourced from television, radio and newspapers, the film reviews the national conversation that took place over this period. Darling directed the music clip video for the end credit song by Paul Kelly "Every Day My Mother's Voice" released for Mother's Day 2019.

The Pool (2024) was filmed at Bondi Icebergs Club, Bondi, Australia and premiered at Sydney Film Festival before screening at the Adelaide Film Festival, CinefestOz, Byron Bay Film Festival with an International premiere at DocEdge.

Darling shared some of his personal story in the 2021 play "The Twins" co-written by school friend Greg Fleet and Sarah Butler, Darling and Fleet played themselves on stage. The play toured to the Adelaide Fringe Festival (one of only a handful of performances originating outside of South Australia during the pandemic) and then Sydney, Canberra and Melbourne.

Darling is the founder and patron of Documentary Australia, a not for profit organisation which encourages collaboration between philanthropic grant makers, charities and documentary filmmakers and winner of the Stanley Hawes Award in 2013. He was chair of the Documentary Australia Foundation from 2006 to 2011. Darling is chair of Good Pitch^{2} Australia, a not-for-profit event hosted in Australia by Shark Island Institute and Documentary Australia. The three Good Pitch events raised more than $15 million in philanthropic grants for the funding of 19 social impact documentaries and their impact campaigns.

Darling was chair of The Caledonia Foundation from 2001 to 2022, a private foundation focusing on the education, training and welfare of disadvantaged young Australians. He was the founder and managing director of the Caledonia Investments group from 1992 to 2003. He is supporter of the Arts, he is patron of the Kangaroo Valley Upper River Hall ArtsLab, and a member of Impact Partners New York. He has been an Ambassador of Antenna Documentary Film Festival and a Patron of Human Rights Arts Film Festival (HRAFF), he was also a Foundation Donor for the Marriage Equality Campaign.

Darling was chair of the Sydney Theatre Company (STC) and STC Foundation from 2006 to 2010. He appointed Cate Blanchett and Andrew Upton as Co-Artistic Directors in 2008 and after leaving STC as chairman, his position was replaced by David Gonski. He has been a member of the advisory board of The Salvation Army and Chair of The Oasis Youth Support Network, and a Director of the National Institute of Dramatic Art (NIDA).

Darling was recipient of the 2007 Creative Partnerships Australia (formerly Australia Business Arts Foundation) Business Leadership Award, and recipient of Australia's Leading Philanthropist Award from Philanthropy Australia in 2017. In 2018 Ian Darling was made an Officer of the Order of Australia (AO) for "distinguished service to documentary film production, to the performing arts, education and community engagement, and to social welfare organisations through philanthropic endeavours". Also in 2018, Darling was the recipient of the Byron Kennedy Award for brave, innovative and wide-ranging pursuit of excellence, presented by the Australian Academy of Cinema and Television Arts (AACTA). He was named Australian National University's 2020 Alumnus of the Year.

Darling holds an MBA from the International Institute for Management Development (IMD) in Switzerland, a BA from the Australian National University and has studied at the New York Film Academy.

== Filmography ==
- 2001 Woodstock for Capitalists Director, Producer
- 2004 Alone Across Australia Director, Producer
- 2007 In The Company of Actors Director, Producer
- 2008 The Oasis Director, Producer
- 2009 Wall Boy producer
- 2009 Polly and Me Director, Producer
- 2011 The Soldier Director, Producer
- 2012 Paul Kelly - Stories of Me Director, Producer
- 2013 Stories From the Inside Producer
- 2015 How to Change the World Executive Producer
- 2015 Last Cab to Darwin Executive Producer
- 2015 The Hunting Ground Executive Producer produced in association with Shark Island Institute
- 2016 Suzy & The Simple Man Director, Producer
- 2017 Unrest Executive Producer
- 2018 The Fourth Estate Executive Producer produced in association with Shark Island Productions
- 2018 Inventing Tomorrow Executive Producer produced in association with Shark Island Productions
- 2019 Life After The Oasis Producer (premiering Sydney Film Festival in June 2019
- 2019 2040 Executive Producer produced in association with Shark Island Productions
- 2019 The Bleeding Edge Executive Producer produced in association with Shark Island Productions
- 2019 The Final Quarter Director, Producer (premiering Sydney Film Festival in June 2019)
- 2020 On the Record Executive Producer produced in association with Shark Island Institute
- 2020 The Department Producer
- 2021 Paper & Glue Executive Producer produced in association with Shark Island Institute
- 2021 Allen v. Farrow Executive Producer
- 2022 "The Twins" Director
- 2024 "The Pool" Director, Producer

== Awards ==
- 2001 CINE Golden Eagle Film and Video Competition (winner) CINE: Woodstock for Capitalists
- 2004 Crystal Heart Award (winner) Heartland Film Festival: Alone Across Australia
- 2005 Telecast-Professional Non-Fiction Division: People and Places (winner) CINE: Alone Across Australia
- 2008 Best Documentary (Nominee) Inside Film Awards: The Oasis
- 2008 Best Direction in a Documentary, (winner) Australian Film Institute Awards: The Oasis
- 2008 Best Documentary (Nominee) Australian Film Institute Awards: The Oasis
- 2008 Best Multimodal Production (winner) ATOM Awards: The Oasis
- 2008 Best Tertiary Education Resource (winner) ATOM Awards: The Oasis
- 2008 Best Education Multimodal Production (Nominee) ATOM Awards: The Oasis
- 2008 Best Documentary Social and Political Issues (Nominee) ATOM Awards: The Oasis
- 2008 Best Documentary Human Story (Nominee) ATOM Awards: The Oasis
- 2008 Best Documentary General (Nominee) ATOM Awards: The Oasis
- 2008 Best Documentary Film (Nominee) Santa Barbara International Film Festival: In The Company of Actors
- 2008 Best Direction (Nominee), Australian Directors' Guild: The Oasis
- 2009 Best Documentary Film (Nominee) Santa Barbara International Film Festival: The Oasis
- 2009 Most Outstanding Documentary (Nominee) Logie Awards: The Oasis
- 2012 Best Documentary (winner) Film Critics Circle of Australia Awards: Paul Kelly - Stories of Me
- 2013 Best Documentary (winner) Film Critics Circle of Australia Awards: Paul Kelly - Stories of Me
- 2013 Best Direction in a Documentary Feature (Nominee) Australian Directors' Guild: Paul Kelly - Stories of Me
- 2013 Best Short Film (winner) Rencontres Internationales du Cinéma des Antipodes: Polly and Me
- 2018 Byron Kennedy Award, Australian Academy of Cinema and Television Arts (AACTA)
- 2019 Best Reporting of an Issue in Sport (winner) Sport Australia Media Awards: The Final Quarter
- 2019 Best Documentary (Nominee) Australian Academy of Cinema and Television Arts (AACTA) Awards: The Final Quarter
- 2019 Best Documentary, Australia & New Zealand (winner) Asian Academy Creative Awards: The Final Quarter
- 2019 Best Documentary, Regional Grand Final (winner) Asian Academy Creative Awards: The Final Quarter
- 2019 Best Documentary (Nominee) Sydney Film Festival: The Final Quarter
- 2019 Feature Documentary of the Year (finalist) Screen Producers Australia Awards
- 2019 For Excellence in Journalism (finalist) Walkley Awards
- 2019 Racism It Stops With Me (winner) Australian Human Rights Commission: The Final Quarter
- 2019 Best Sound in a Documentary (Nominee) Australian Screen Sound Guild
- 2019 Audience Award (Runner Up) Sydney Film Festival
- 2020 Best Feature Documentary (winner) Film Critics Circle of Australia: The Final Quarter
- 2020 Best Documentary History (winner) ATOM Awards: The Final Quarter
- 2020 Best Documentary Social & Political Issues (winner) ATOM Awards: The Final Quarter
- 2020 Best Educational/Training Video or Website (Primary/Secondary) (winner) ATOM Awards: The Final Quarter
- 2020 Best Documentary General (winner) ATOM Awards: The Final Quarter

== Good Pitch Australia ==
Shark Island Institute and Documentary Australia Foundation host Good Pitch^{2} Australia, and brought the first of these events to Sydney in October 2014. The 2015 event was held in September and the last in a trilogy of events was held at the Sydney Opera House in November 2016. The community partners for the event are Philanthropy Australia and Pro Bono Australia. Since 2014, more than $14 million has been raised in philanthropic grants for the funding of 19 social impact documentaries and their impact campaigns, forging priceless pro bono support and 300+ powerful strategic partnerships between community groups, the corporate sector, NGOs and policy makers. Supported documentaries include: That Sugar Film, Frackman, Gayby Baby, Zach's Ceremony, Call Me Dad, Constance On The Edge, Blue, Happy Sad Man, The Hunting Ground, Prison Songs, The Opposition, On Richard's Side, Whiteley (about Australian artist Brett Whiteley), Guilty, 2040, Ghosthunter, Dying to Live, In My Blood It Runs, The Leadership. Good Pitch is a BRITDOC project in partnership with Ford Foundation and the Sundance Institute Documentary Film Program.

== Honours ==
- 2007 Recipient of the Creative Partnerships Australia (Formerly AbaF) Business Arts Leadership Award.
- 2008 one of the AFR Magazine Influential Australians.
- 2017 Recipient of Australia's Leading Philanthropist Award from Philanthropy Australia.
- 2018 Officer of the Order of Australia (AO) for "distinguished service to documentary film production, to the performing arts, education and community engagement, and to social welfare organisations through philanthropic endeavours".
- 2018 Recipient of the AACTA Byron Kennedy Award for brave, innovative and wide-ranging pursuit of excellence.
- 2020 Australian National University Alumnus of the Year
