= Paul Charlier =

Australian composer and sound designer

Paul Charlier is an Australian composer, sound designer and writer who works in both theatre and film. He has also worked as a writer/producer for ABC Radio and was a founding member of the Sydney post-punk band SoliPsiK. His theatre work includes the Sydney Theatre Company productions of RBG: Of Many One, A Streetcar Named Desire (Sound Designer) and Uncle Vanya (Composer and Sound Designer), as well as the Company B productions of Faith Healer (Composer) and The Diary of a Madman (Sound Designer) and the Griffin Theatre world-premiere production of Prima Facie. His film credits include The Pool, The Final Quarter (Composer), Looking for Alibrandi (Sound Designer), Candy (Composer and Sound Designer), Paul Kelly - Stories of Me (Sound Designer) and Last Ride (Composer).

He has taught performance sound design at the National Institute of Dramatic Art and lectured in and presented about film sound at the Australian Film, Television and Radio School and the University of Technology Sydney, and about automata at TISEA and Sound Culture. In 1996 he presented the two Ear/Shot sessions on film sound at the Sydney Film Festival.

== Awards and nominations ==
=== Film ===
- The Final Quarter (2019)
- Paul Kelly - Stories of Me (2012) Winner 2013 Australian Screen Sound Guild Best Sound for a Documentary.
- Paul Kelly - Stories of Me (2012) Nominated AACTA Award for Best Sound in a Documentary.
- Candy - Nominated for a 2006 FCCA Award (Best Music Score)
- The Projectionist - Nominated (with Ian McLoughlin) for a 2003 AFI Award (Best Sound in a Non-Feature Film)

=== Theatre ===
- The Diary of a Madman - Won (with Alan John) a 2010 Sydney Theatre Award (Best Score or Sound Design)
- A Streetcar Named Desire - Won a 2009 Sydney Theatre Award (Best Score or Sound Design) and a 2010 Helpmann Award (Best Sound Design)
- Buried Child - Nominated for a 2003 Helpmann Award (Best Sound Design)

=== Physical theatre ===
- Honour Bound - Won a 2006 Sydney Theatre Award (Best Score or Sound Design) and a 2006 Greenroom Award (Outstanding Composition/Sound Design)

== Body of work ==
=== Film ===
- The Pool - Dir. Ian Darling. (2024) Shark Island Productions
- The Comedian Dir. Ian Darling. Featuring Greg Fleet. (2020)
- The Final Quarter Dir. Ian Darling. (2019) Shark Island Productions
- Suzy & The Simple Man - Dir. Ian Darling, Jon Muir, Suzan Muir (2016) Shark Island Productions
- Holding the Man (film) - Dir. Neil Armfield. (2015)
- Paul Kelly - Stories of Me - Dir. Ian Darling (2012) Shark Island Productions
- Last Ride - Dir. Glendyn Innis. (2009)
- Candy - Dir. Neil Armfield. (2006)
- The Cost of Living - Dir. Lloyd Newson. (2005)
- The Projectionist - Dir. Michael Bates. (2003)
- Looking for Alibrandi - Dr Kate Woods. (2000)
- Aftershocks - Dir. Geoff Burton. (1998)
- Amongst Equals - Dir. Tom Zubrycki. (1991)
- Friends and Enemies - Dir. Tom Zubrycki. (1987)

=== Theatre - original music and sound design ===
- And The There Were None - Dir: Robyn Nevin. Cossroads Live (2025)
- Gaslight - Dir: Lee Lewis. New Theatricals (2024)
- RBG: Of Many, One – Dir: Priscilla Jackson, Sydney Theatre Company (2022)
- Prima Facie - Dir: Lee Lewis. Griffin Theatre Company (2019)
- The Dance of Death - Dir: Judy Davis. Belvoir St Theatre (2018)
- Faith Healer - Dir: Judy Davis. Belvoir St Theatre (2016)
- Uncle Vanya - Dir: Tamas Ascher. Sydney Theatre Company. (2010)
- Tot Mom - Dir: Steven Soderbergh. Sydney Theatre Company. (2009)
- A Streetcar Named Desire - Dir: Liv Ullmann, Sydney Theatre Company. (2009)
- Afterlife - Dir: Michael Blakemore. Royal National Theatre. (2008)
- Toy Symphony - Dir: Neil Armfield. Company B. (2007)
- The Cherry Orchard – Dir: Howard Davies, Sydney Theatre Company (2005)
- Influence - Dir: Bruce Myles, Sydney Theatre Company. (2005)
- Victory - Dir: Judy Davis with Ben Winspear. Sydney Theatre Company. (2004)
- Last Cab To Darwin – Dir: Jeremy Simms, Porkchop Theatre (2004)
- The Lieutenant of Inishmore - Dir: Neil Armfield. Company B. (2003)
- The Way of the World - Dir: Gale Edwards. Sydney Theatre Company. (2003)
- Buried Child - Dir: Gale Edwards. Company B. (2002)
- Suddenly Last Summer - Dir: Neil Armfield. Company B. (2000)
- The Seagull - Dir: Neil Armfield. Company B. (1997)
- The Blind Giant Is Dancing - Dir: Neil Armfield. Company B. (1995)
- Aftershocks - Dir: Neil Armfield. Company B. (1993)
- Slippery When Wet – Dir: Peter Kingston, Griffin Theatre Company
- The Hamletmachine - Dir: Jean-Pierre Mignon, Anthill Theatre
- To Have Done with The Judgement of God – Dir: Jean-Pierre Mignon, Anthill Theatre (1981)

=== Theatre - sound design ===
- The Diary of a Madman - Dir: Neil Armfield. Company B. (2010)
- Deuce - Dir: Michael Blakemore. Music Box Theatre. (2007)
- Ying Tong - Dir: Richard Cottrell. Sydney Theatre Company. (2007)
- Hedda Gabler - Dir: Robyn Nevin. Sydney Theatre Company. (2006)
- Democracy - Dir: Michael Blakemore. Sydney Theatre Company (2005)
- The Real Thing - Dir: Robyn Nevin. Sydney Theatre Company. (2003)
- Waiting For Godot - Dir: Neil Armfield. Company B. (2003)
- Copenhagen - Dir: Michael Blakemore. Sydney Theatre Company. (2002)
- The Judas Kiss - Dir: Neil Armfield. Company B and The Festival Of Sydney. (1999)
- Night On Bald Mountain - Dir: Neil Armfield. Company B. (1997)
- Hamlet - Dir: Neil Armfield. Company B. (1994)

=== Physical theatre and dance - original score and sound design ===
- Jurrungu Ngan-ga/Straight Talk - Chr: Dalisa Pigram with the performers Dir: Rachael Swain. Marrugeku and Carriageworks (2022)
- Wireless – Dir: Lisa Wilson and Paul Charlier. Judith Wright Centre (2017)
- Honour Bound - Dir: Nigel Jamieson, Chr: Garry Stewart. Sydney Opera House and Malthouse Theatre. (2006)
- Already Elsewhere - Chr: Kate Champion. Force Majeure and Sydney Festival. (2005)
- DV8: The Cost Of Living / Can We Afford This? - Dir/Chr: Lloyd Newson. DV8 Physical Theatre. (2000)
- Blood Vessel - Dir: Rachael Swain. Stalker Theatre Company. (1998)
- Echo Point – Chr: Meryl Tankard, Off-Broadway Theatre (1984)

=== Radio features - script and music ===
- E-Dice: A Plan For Eurydice - Commissioned by ABC Radio. (1991)
- A Fall - Commissioned by ABC Radio. (1991)
- The Touring Machine - Commissioned by The Museum of Contemporary Art, Los Angeles. Co-produced by ABC Radio. (1989)
- Remembrance Day - ABC Radio 'Surface Tension'. (1985)

=== Installation Soundtracks ===
- Proxy – Dev: Andre Lepecki and Rachel Swain, The Performance Space (2002)
- Line of Fire – Dev: Dennis Del Favero. Script by Paul Charlier and Dennis Del Favero. Art Gallery of NSW (1987). Soundtrack broadcast ABC-FM (1987). Soundtrack Special Commendation, Prix Italia 1988.
- Quegli ultimi momenti (Those Final Moments) Dev: Dennis Del Favero. Australian Centre for Photography and Art Gallery of NSW (1984). Soundtrack broadcast ABC-FM (1987)

== Discography ==
=== Soundtracks ===
- Last Ride OST - Level 2 Music. (2009)
- Candy OST - Inertia. (2006)

=== SoliPsiK ===
- See Saw (single track) on Can't Stop It 2 – Australian Post Punk 1979-84 (compilation), Chapter Music. (2006)
- Leichenschrei (1982)
- Zombod (single track) on "A Sampler" (compilation), M-Squared Records. (1982)
- See Saw (single), M-Squared Records. (1981)

=== Other ===
- The Touring Machine - The Museum of Contemporary Art, Los Angeles. (1990)

== Other reading ==
- "Faith Healer at Belvoir". smh.com.au.
- "Sonic boom". The Australian. 11 June 2011.
- Volley Up by Brian Reesman in Stage Directions USA
