= In the Company of Actors =

- Directed by: Ian Darling
- Produced by: Ian Darling; Susan MacKinnon
- Cinematography: Simon Smith
- Edited by: Sally Fryer
- Release date: 2007
- Running time: 75 minutes
- Country: Australia
- Language: English

In the Company of Actors is a 2007 Australian documentary film directed by Ian Darling and produced by Shark Island Productions. It features Cate Blanchett, Hugo Weaving, Justine Clarke, and Aden Young as they prepare a stage production of Hedda Gabler, from rehearsals at the Sydney Theatre Company to opening night at the Brooklyn Academy of Music in New York City.

== Synopsis ==
The documentary shows actors rehearsing for a play in the rehearsal room. While the action of re-staging the play Hedda Gabler, the film also has interspersed talking heads of the cast talking about the craft of acting. The education materials also have short films from the technical crew and production staff.

== Release ==
The film was broadcast in Australia on ABC1 February 2008. It was selected for screening at the following film festivals: Sydney Film Festival in 2007, Melbourne International Film Festival, Vancouver International Film Festival, St Tropez Internationales du Cinema des Antipodes, Santa Barbara International Film Festival, Mumbai International Film Festival, OzFliz Ontario, the London Australian Film Festival, River Run International Film Festival.

== Education and outreach ==
The film and study guide package was donated to English, Drama and Media departments in all secondary schools across Australia with support from the Caledonia Foundation. The education version of the film is available online and has specific Australian Curriculum linked lessons developed in association with Sydney Theatre Company.
