= Doomadgee (disambiguation) =

Doomadgee is a locality in Queensland, Australia.

Doomadgee may also refer to:

== People ==
- Alec Doomadgee, Indigenous Australian actor and community leader
- Mulrunji Doomadgee, a.k.a. Cameron Doomadgee, Indigenous Australian man who died in custody on Palm Island in 2004, sparking riots
- Zach Doomadgee, son of Alec, who features in the documentary film Zach's Ceremony

== Places ==
- Aboriginal Shire of Doomadgee, a local government area in North West Queensland, Australia
  - Doomadgee Airport, in Doomadgee
