= Wash My Soul in the River's Flow =

2021 film directed by Philippa Bateman

- Directed by: Philippa Bateman
- Written by: Philippa Bateman
- Release date: 2021
- Country: Australia

Wash My Soul in the River's Flow is an Australian film about singer-songwriters Archie Roach and Ruby Hunter, who were children of the Stolen Generation. It was written and directed by Philippa Bateman. Archie Roach was also a producer of the film and the team worked closely with Ruby Hunter’s surviving family. The film is a combination of concert film, biography and history. The film was winner of the top prize for Best Documentary Feature at the Australian International Documentary Conference in 2023. The award jury commented in their statement: “Elegant, confident, and intimate to its magnetic subjects, Bateman’s film so impressively captures a setting and a stage where music compels the story of their lives, and where it stands proudly in resistance against the injustices of our history.”

== Synopsis ==
The film is an intimate portrait of First Nations Australian singer-songwriters Ruby Hunter and Archie Roach. It is a story about love and loss, connection to Country and the transformative power of music. The narrative is built around rehearsals, songs, conversations and opening night footage of a 2004 concert, Kura Tungar, which premiered to a full house and standing ovation at Hammer Hall, Melbourne.

In spoken word and song, Roach and Hunter tell their stories about being stolen from their Aboriginal families in the 1960s, finding each other on the streets as teenage runaways in search of the families they were stolen from, falling in love, overcoming alcoholism, the healing power of music and Aboriginal culture, and their return to family and country. Sharing the screen with Hunter and Roach are cinematic images of Ngarrindjeri Country - the Coorong and lower Murray River in South Australia, where Ruby Hunter was stolen when she was eight years old. As adults, Hunter and Roach returned there to raise their family.

The film also uses photographs, super 8 film, black and white abstract images, and direct quotes from Ruby Hunter, as well as Archie Roach’s memoir, Tell Me Why: The Story of My Life and Music.

== Production ==
In 2004, Roach and Hunter, in collaboration with Paul Grabowsky and the Australian Art Orchestra, created Kura Tungar. Philippa Bateman’s production company filmed the rehearsals, concert and conversations between the creators, after Kura Tungar’s director Patrick Nolan approached Bateman to document the creative process and concert. At the time, the Australian government had not apologised to the Stolen Generations. Kura Tungar was conceived, in part, as an act of reconciliation through artistic collaboration between Indigenous and non-Indigenous artists.

Ruby Hunter’s surviving brothers Eric Richards and Jeff Hunter were involved with the filmmakers in the production, in particular shooting on Ngarrindjeri Country. Rosslyn Richards, Hunter’s sister-in-law, working with Ngarrindjeri Elders, translated and supplied the subtitles in Ngarrindjeri language which appear with English text on screen.

An Enigma Machine Production, the film was produced by Archie Roach, Kate Hodges and Philippa Bateman. Executive producers are Ian Darling and Emma Donovan. It was funded by Screen Australia, Shark Island Institute, philanthropic funders and Screen NSW.

== Release (Australia) ==
The film was to premiere at MIFF on 20 August 2021 but the festival was cancelled due to Covid. It screened at the Sydney Film Festival in November 2021. It was released in Australian cinemas on 7 March 2022. Following its theatrical release, the film was released on streaming platform Stan, Apple TV and others. It was shown on ABC TV 1 in July 2023.

== Reception ==
It was ranked the top documentary in The Guardian’s “Top Ten Films of 2022” with Luke Buckmaster writing “On the many occasions this film soars, it’s sublime”. David Stratton, of The Australian, awarded it four stars out of five, "This beautiful film is, in every way, a memorable experience". Sarah Ward, Concrete Playground, writes “Combined with the movie's music, plus its dedication to unflinchingly diving into the problematic past, Wash My Soul in the River's Flow becomes a quintessential portrait of Australia"

Philippa Bateman was nominated for an Australian Director’s Guild Award for Best Direction in a Debut Feature (2022).
