= Australian Sports Commission Media Awards =

Sports award

The Australian Sports Commission (ASC) Media Awards were established in 2002 to recognise excellence in Australian sports journalism and broadcasting. The awards focus on analytical and insightful reporting and the presentation of sport and sporting issues. The awards are the only dedicated sports media awards in Australia. The Walkley Awards do have several sports categories.

The most prestigious award is the Lifetime Achievement Award that recognises exceptional service to sports journalism over an extended period of time. This award is determined by the Sport Australia Board.

== Lifetime Achievement Award ==
Year	Journalist
2002	Harry Gordon
2003	Norman May
2004	Johnny Warren
2005	Alan Trengove
2006	Ian Heads
2007	Mike Gibson
2008	Bruce McAvaney
2009	Les Murray
2010	Caroline Wilson
2011	Roy Masters
2012	Peter Wilkins
2013	Ron Reed
2014	Ken Sutcliffe
2015	Mike Coward
2016	Rebecca Wilson
2017	Debbie Spillane
2018	Dennis Cometti
2019	Karen Tighe
2020	Jim Maxwell
2021	Mike Sheahan
2022	Tracey Holmes
2023	Ray Warren
2024	Margie McDonald
2025	Phil Hillyard

== Best Reporting of an Issue in Australian Sport ==
Year	Journalists	Comments
2002	Kate McClymont and Anne Davies (Sydney Morning Herald)	Bulldogs salary cap scandal
2003	Kyle Patterson (SBS)	Soccer's Crawford Reform Process.
2004	Michael Davis (The Australian)	His Fragile Brilliance (James Hird)
2005	Neil Jameson (Inside Sport)	‘Professional Foul’
2006	Nick McCallum (Fox Footy)	'Blowing the whistle'
2007	Robert Drane and Ian Kennins (Inside Sport)	Goodbye Grassroots
2008	Gerard Ryle and Jacquelin Magnay (Sydney Morning Herald)	Firepower
2009	Mike Hurst (Daily Telegraph)	Caster Semenya
2010	Adrian Proszenko, Brad Walter, Greg Prichard and others (Fairfax Media)	Thunderstruck
2011	Greg Prichard and Chris Barrett (Sydney Morning Herald)	Want a Bet?
2012	Daniel Lane (Fairfax Media)	'For 30 years, they had a monster in their midst'
2013	Andrew Holden (The Age)	Essendon FC drug scandal
2014	Michael Warner, Mark Robinson and Chip Le Grand (Herald Sun and The Australian)	Essendon drugs scandal
2015	Caro Meldrum-Hanna, Sam Clark and Max Murch (ABC Four Corners)	‘Making a killing’
2016	Nick Tabakoff (Daily Telegraph)	Gotcha: The Parramatta Eels Salary Cap Scandal
2017	Louise Milligan, Lisa McGregor and Trish Drum (ABC Four Corners)	‘After the Game’,
2018	Leo Schlink (Herald Sun)	'The big fix'
2019	Shark Island Productions	The Final Quarter
2020	Jessica Halloran and Julian Linden, The Australian and The Daily Telegraph	'On Thin Ice: Katia's Story'
2021	Selina Steele, Michael Cain, Julian Linden; Adrian Arciuli, Anna Henderson, Abdullah Alikhil	Tackling abuse in football, The Daily Telegraph; The Taliban Takeover, SBS
2022	Julian Linden News Corp	Swimming takes the plunge
2023	David Mark, ABC News; Scott Gullan, Herald Sun	The investigation into paedophile rock climbing coach Stephen Mitchell; Peter Bol drugs scandal
2024	Julian Linden, News Corp	‘China's secret doping cover-up’
2025	Jessica Halloran and Stephen Rice, The Australian	The abuse of athletes, including Olympic gold medallist Nina Kennedy, by pole vault coach Alex Parnov.

== Best Coverage of a Sporting Event ==
Year	Journalists	Coverage title
2005	1197 RPH Adelaide	South Australian National Football League (SANFL).
2006	SBS	
2007	Nine Network	Amazing Adelaide
2008	SBS	Cycling
2009	Inside Sport	
2010	Broadcast Media - Nine Network; Print Media - Sydney Morning Herald	State of Origin 2010; Sport coverage
2011	Broadcast Media - SBS; Print Media - (The Sunday Telegraph)	Cycling; Sport coverage
2012	Broadcast Media - Fox Sports; Print Media - The Sunday Age	2011-12 KFC T20 Big Bash League; Winners, sinners, grinners
2013	Broadcast Media - Fox Sports; Digital Media - Toby Forage SBS	Rugby; 2013 Tour de France
2014	Sporting Event - Network Ten; Digital Media - Fox Sports and News Corporation)	Big Bash Cricket; Network Sport — ‘Taking the world game to every Australian’
2015	Sporting Event - The Age; Digital Media - cricket.com.au	2014 AFL grand final 2015 Ashes test series
2016	Sporting Event - Network Ten; Digital Media - Seven Network	2015-16 Big Bash League; Olympics on 7
2017	Sporting Event - Fox Sports; Digital Media - Seven Network	Horn v Pacquiao – World Title’ ‘Summer of 7Tennis 2017’
2018	Sporting Event - Seven Network	2018 Commonwealth Games
2019	The Age & The Sydney Morning Herald	2019 Ashes series
2020	Sporting Event - Fox Sports Australia	Boxing Day Test
2021	Sporting Event - Seven Network	Tokyo 2020 Olympics
2022	News Corp	Commonwealth Games, Birmingham
2023	Optus Sport	2023 FIFA Women’s World Cup
2024	Nine Network; News Corp	Paris 2024 Olympic and Paralympic Games; Paris 2024 Olympic and Paralympic Games
2025	Seven Network	Bathurst 1000

== Best Individual Sport Coverage ==
Year	Journalists
2006	Robert Drane (Inside Sport)
2007	Michael Dodge (Herald Sun)
2008	Will Swanton (Fairfax Media)
2009	Gerard Whateley (ABC)
2010	Broadcast Media - Gerard Whateley (ABC); Print Media - Mike Colman (The Courier-Mail)
2011	Broadcast Media - Michael Tomalaris (SBS); Print Media -David Sygall (The Sun-Herald)
2012	Broadcast Media - Gerard Whateley (ABC) and (Fox Sports); Print Media - Richard Hinds (Sydney Morning Herald)
2013	Television - Gerard Whateley (Fox Footy and ABC); Print Media - Caroline Wilson (The Age); Radio - Gerard Whateley (ABC
2014	Television - Gerard Whateley (ABC) and Fox Footy); Radio - Gerard Whateley (Grandstand AFL); Print Media - Will Swanton (The Australian)
2015	Broadcast Media - Gerard Whateley (ABC and Fox Footy); Print media - Will Swanton (The Australian); Digital Media - David Weiner (Fox Sports)
2016	Broadcast Media - Bruce McAvaney (Seven Network); Print Media - Will Swanton (The Australian); Digital Media - Jack Kerr (freelancer)
2017	Broadcast Media - Kelli Underwood (Fox Sports and ABC); Print Media - Konrad Marshall (Good Weekend Magazine)
2018	Broadcast Media - Lucy Zelic (Special Broadcasting Service); Print Media - Andrew Webster (The Sydney Morning Herald); Digital - Michael Chammas (NRL.com)
2019	Broadcast Media - Gerard Whateley (SEN Radio and Fox Footy); Print Media - Konrad Marshall (Good Weekend); Digital - Mary Konstantopoulos (Ladies Who League)
2020	Audio - Quentin Hull, ABC Radio; Written -Peter Badel, The Courier-Mail; Video - Joint winners: Zac Bailey, NRL.com and Kelli Underwood, ABC and Fox Sports Australia
2021	Audio - Neroli Meadows, Ordineroli Speaking; Video - David Culbert, Seven Network; Written - Phil Lutton, The Sydney Morning Herald
2022	Audio - Neroli Meadows, Ordineroli Speaking; Written - Phil Lutton, The Sydney Morning Herald; Written - Peter Badel, News Corp
2023	Broadcast - Gerard Whateley, SEN / Fox Footy; Written - Tom Decent, The Sydney Morning Herald
2024	Broadcast - Corbin Middlemas, ABC Sport; Written -Will Swanton, The Australian
2025	Broadcast - Bruce McAvaney - Seven Network / SBS; Written - Peter Badel – The Courier Mail

== Best Sport Profile ==
Year	Journalists	Story coverage
2005	Angus Fontaine (Inside Cricket)	The Warrior Within’ (Justin Langer)
2006	Broadcast Media - Ben Cheshire (ABC Australian Story); Print Media - Peter Lalor (The Australian)	'One Perfect Day' (Death of cyclist Amy Gillett) 'Mongrel Streak'
2007	Broadcast Media - Wendy Page and Ian Harley (ABC Australian Story); Print Media - Anthony Sharwood Alpha Magazine	'Man of the Century' (Barry 'Nugget' Rees) 'Running for his life'
2008	Broadcast Media - (ABC Australian Story); Print - Media - Caroline Wilson (The Age)	'She's not there' (Sally Robbins) 'How football failed one of its own'
2009	Broadcast Media - Roger Carter (ABC Australian Story); Print Media - Jessica Halloran (Fairfax Media)	'When We Were Racers' (Sir Jack Brabham) 'Jelena Dokic'
2010	Broadcast Media - John Taylor (ABC); Print Media - Amanda Hooton (Good Weekend Magazine)	'Boxing hopeful' (Dane Mulivai) 'Mark Webber – Mark 1’
2011	Broadcast Media - Mary Gearin(ABC 7.30 Report); Print Media - Robert Drane (Inside Sport)	'Mick and David' (Mick Malthouse and David Buttifant) 'Bloodlines' (Adam Goodes)
2012	Broadcast Media - Denise Reardon (Fox Sports); Print Media - Paul Connolly (The Global Mail)	Profiles: Julian Huxley ‘The fastest man you've never heard of’ (Josh Ross)
2013	Broadcast Media - Caitlin Shea and Roger Carter (ABC); Print Media - Wayne Smith (The Australian)	Know Thy Enemy; That Sinking Feeling
2014	Broadcast Media -Ryan Smith, Denise Reardon, Frank Chidiac, Maria Cardomatis and Lisa Shaunessy (Fox Sports) and South Sydney Media); Print Media - Jake Niall (The Age)	‘Slammin’ Sam’ (Sam Burgess) ‘Inside the world of Liam Jurrah’
2015	Broadcast Media - Brad Smith, Mike Hirchfield and Mick Neill (Fox Footy); Print media - Robert Drane (Inside Sport)	‘Dan Menzel – a long way home’ ‘The blame game’ (Ahmed Saad)
2016	Broadcast Media - Winsome Denyer, Tim Wilson and Marc Smith(ABC Australian Story); Print Media - Will Swanton (The Australian)	'True Grit – David Pocock' 'Jarryd Hayne'
2017	Broadcast Media - Adrian Brown (Whooshka Media); Print Media - Grantlee Kieza (The Courier-Mail); Digital Media - Nathan Ryan (Fox Sports), ‘	‘Outsiders’ ‘Prized Fighter - Jeff Horn’ 'Beyond the Game: Inside the NRL World'
2018	Broadcast Media - Andy Maher (1116 SEN); Print Media - Will Swanton (The Australian)	Jarrod Lyle interview 'Is this bloke a thug' (Robert Whittaker)
2019	Broadcast Media - Josh Cable, Marcus Cobbledick (Good Thing Productions); Print Media - Samantha Lane (The Sydney Morning Herald & The Age)	‘Collingwood: From the Inside Out’, ‘Adam Goodes’
2020	Broadcast - Adrian Brown, Richard Ostroff, Whooshka Media and Cricket Australia; Iain Payten, The Sydney Morning Herald	‘The Test – A New Era for Australia’s Team’ ‘Judging Jane Saville’
2021	Broadcast Media - Australian Story ABC TV; Written Media - Konrad Marshall, Good Weekend	Luc Longley: One Giant Leap; Patty Mills: All the right moves
2022	Broadcast - Fearless, JamTV / Disney; Written - Emma Kemp and Carly Earl, The Guardian	The inside story of the AFLW; The Medal Maker
2023	Broadcast, JamTV / Stan; Written - Greg Baum, The Age	Danielle Laidley: Two Tribes; But wait, there’s Moore: why the Collingwood captain is not a conventional footballer
2024	Written - Kirby Short	Cricket Australia: ‘Comes in waves, the fall and rise of Josie Dooley
2025	Written - Andrew Webster - The Australian	

== Best Sport Podcast ==
Year	Title
2022	Head Noise, The Australian
2023	The Howie Games, Mark Howard / Listnr
2024	The Final Word Cricket Podcast, Adam Collins and Geoff Lemon
2025	In The Beginning - Liam Flanagan and Courtney Atkinson

== Best Sports Documentary ==
Year	Title
2024	Came From Nowhere - Western Sydney Wanderers FC SBS
2025	Unbreakable: The Jelena Dokic Story - In Films / Nine Network

== Best Coverage of Sport for People with a Disability ==
Year	Journalists	Story Title
2010	Dwayne Grant (Gold Coast Publications)	‘Never Say Never’
2011	Leanne West (Network Ten)	‘David and Michelle’
2012	Stathi Paxinos (Fairfax Media)	‘London Paralympic Games’
2013	Mike Dalton (Nine Network)	Special Olympics Junior Games
2014	Emma Greenwood (Gold Coast Bulletin)	‘He who dares lives’
2015	Amanda Shalala (ABC Radio Grandstand)	‘Grandstand para-sport profiles’
2016	Seven Network	'Rio 2016 Paralympic Games'
2017	Jim Callinan (Sky News Australia)	‘Oz Day 10K Wheelchair Road Race'
2018	Matt Carmichael (Seven Network)	2018 Winter Paralympics and 2018 Commonwealth Games
2019	Australian Broadcasting Corporation	2018 Invictus Games
2020	Matt Carmichael (Seven Network)	Paralympic Presence
2021	Tom Decent (Sydney Morning Herald / The Age)	The power of the Paralympics
2022	Matt Carmichael (Seven Network)	
2023	Bowls Australia	
2024	Elizabeth Wright ABC Sport	
2025	Elizabeth Wright ABC Sport	

== Best Sports Journalism from Rural or Regional media ==
Year	Journalists	Story title
2002	Brett Kohlhagen (Border Mail)	
2003	Gerard Walsh (Warwick Daily News)	Polocrosse World Cup Coverage
2004	Daniel DeNardi (The Liverpool Champion)	‘No Place to Call Home’
2005	Kim Sporton (Bayside Weekly)	Exploration of VFL football team, the Sandringham Zebras
2006	Luke Turgeon (Gold Coast Bulletin)	'Body of work'
2007	Aaron Kearney ABC Radio	'Bringing the World Game to Newcastle'
2008	Richard Schmeiszl Sentinel-Times Newspaper	'Football Crisis'
2009	Samantha Derrick WIN News Wollongong	'Never Too Old: Seniors in Sport'
2010	Andrew Piva (Cairns Post); Tim Doutré (Star News Group)	‘All about the game for life’ ‘Are player payments killing the game?’
2011	Allison Jess (ABC Goulburn Murray)	'Coby's Back'
2012	Newcastle Herald Sports Department	‘Trouble in Tinkler Town’
2013	Michael Warren (Mackay Telegraph)	Barba Inc
2014	Robert Dillon (Newcastle Herald)	‘Bye, bye boganarie’
2015	Matthew McInerney (APN Fraser Coast Chronicle)	‘Body of work’
2016	Robert Dillon (Newcastle Herald)	'Dreams and Knightmares'
2017	Grant Edwards (Sunshine Coast Daily)	‘Multisport Mecca’
2018	Mackenzie Colahan (Central and North Burnett Times)	Decline of rugby league in outback Queensland'
2019	Stuart Walmsley	RUGBY.com.au
2020	Kieran Pender, Mike Bowers, Freelance and Guardian Australia	"From the ashes of catastrophe: how 'aqua therapy' is helping a town through 2020'
2021	Donna Page (Newcastle Herald)	Newcastle cricket's turf war
2022	Zoe Keenan and Dinushi Dias (ABC South West WA)	Racism and sexism in country football
2023	ABC News Tasmania	Stacking the Odds: Inside a Tasmanian harness racing juggernaut
2024	James Gardiner (Newcastle Herald)	‘Newcastle Jets - a turbulent year for Newcastle’s flagship football side
2025	James Gardiner (Newcastle Herald)	

== Best Depiction of Inclusive Sport ==
From 2009 to 2017 called Best Coverage of Women in Sport.

Year	Journalists	Coverage title
2009	Merryn Sherwood (Canberra Times)	'Canberra United - Making a Difference for Women's Sport' (Special commendation)
2010	Raelee Tuckerman (Bendigo Advertiser)	
2011	Luke Waters (SBS)	‘A Belt that Fits’
2012	Canberra Times	‘A capital season for women in Canberra’
2013	Warren Partland (The Advertiser)	Raising Netball's Status
2014	Matt Weiss, Denise Reardon and Kelli Underwood (Fox Sports)	‘Breaking Ground’
2015	SBS	The 2015 women's FIFA World Cup
2016	Network Ten	2015-16 Women's Big Bash League
2017	Fox Footy	AFL Women's coverage
2018	Australian Broadcasting Corporation	The Outer Sanctum Podcast
2019	Media Stockade	‘Power Meri’
2020	Amanda Shalala, ABC	'In Her Words'
2021	Peter Dickson	The Ripple Effect, Dickson Films
2022	Johnny Taranto	I’m Not a Runner, Adventure Time Films
2023	Konrad Marshall, Good Weekend Magazine	Life changes tomorrow and I’m just being me
2024	That Pacific Sports Show, ABC	
2025	Vicki Schwarz, Nine News Adelaide	

== Best Coverage of Sport by a Club or Organisation ==
Year	Organisation
2022	GWS Giants
2023	Football Australia Matildas’ World Cup Campaign
2024	Surfing Australia 2024 Australian Boardriders Battle
2025	Box Hill Hawks 2025 VFL season

== Best Sports Photography ==
Year	Photographer	Image Title
2002	Bruce Long (The Courier-Mail)	‘Grabba’
2003	Kristi Miller (The Sunday Telegraph)	The Gus and Joey saga
2004	Ray Kennedy (The Age); Vincent Long (Inside Sport)	Doubles’ photo of US doubles pair, Mike and Bob Bryan 'Park Life'
2005	Nicole Garmston (Herald Sun)	‘Bird Strike’
2006	Warren Clark (Inside Sport)	'The Fight'
2007	Michael Dodge Herald Sun); Alex Coppel Sunday Herald Sun	Dream Catchers; Tiwi Magpies
2008	Michael Dodge Herald Sun)	Football Life
2009	Quinn Rooney (Getty Images)	Water Relief
2010	Craig Golding (Getty Images)	2010 World Masters Games
2011	Mark Dadswell (Getty Images)	PNG Cricket
2012	Scott Barbour Getty Images	Rugby League 2012
2013	Rohan Thomson (Canberra Times)	Canberra Cavalry
2014	Cameron Spencer (Getty Images)	‘Rain Dance’
2015	Brett Costello (Daily Telegraph)	‘Shark Splash’
2016	Cameron Spencer (Getty Images)	Say Cheese
2017	Michael Dodge (Getty Images)	‘Cyril Magic’
2018	Ryan Pierse (Getty Images)	'‘Cop it on the Chin’
2019	Michael Willson	‘The Kick’ AFL Photo of Tayla Harris
2020	Scott Barbour, Australian Associated Press	'The Melbourne Cup'
2021	Jay Town	Eye on the ball, Tennis Australia
2022	Quinn Rooney (Getty Images)	Diving for gold
2023	Robert Cianflone	Heart of a Nation
2024	Delly Carr	Jess Fox celebrates Noèmie Fox’s win
2025	Martin Keep	AFP - All eyes on Gout Gout

== Rising Star Award ==
Year	Person
2024	Ellie Cole
2025	Dan Batten - Geelong Advertiser

== Best Analysis of the Business of Sport ==
Year	Journalists/Media	Story Title
2013	John Stensholt (Australian Financial Review)	Cricket Broadcast Rights
2014	Ramy Haidar (Inside Sport)	‘The Cyberscrimmage’
2015	Simon King (The Australian's Deal Magazine)	‘Charting a bold course’
2016	Jeff Centenera (Inside Sport)	'The 0.1 percenters'
2017	Jack Kerr (Freelance)	‘Sports Betting Industry Analysis’
2018	John Stensholt and Max Mason (Australian Financial Review)	'Cricket Broadcast Rights'
2019	Tracey Holmes	The Ticket, ABC

== Best Contribution to Sport via Digital Media ==
Year	Media
2018	PlayersVoice (Interviews with leading Australian athletes)
2019	Herald Sun ‘Sacked' - Mick Malthouse talks about his sacking from Collingwood Football Club

== Innovation in Sports Media ==
Year	Media
2020	Fox Sports Audio, Virtual Crowd and Flying Fox Camera, Fox Sports Australia
2021	Optus Sport, Social Media Innovation, UEFA EURO 2020

== Best Depiction of the Value of Sport to Australians in a Community Setting ==
Up until 2009 named Community Sports Award

Year	Journalists	Story Title
2002	David Pearson and Brian Webb of 104.1FM, Darwin	
2003	Nick McCallum (Nine Network Today Show)	'Manangatang Horse story'
2004	Mark Howard (Seven Network)	'Footy From the Hearts'
2005	Brad McEwan (Network Ten)	‘Local Hero’ series
2006	Nick McCallum (Fox Footy Channel)	Footy Fanatics
2007	Travis Cranley (Inside Sport)	'Disabling sports'
2008	Paul Kennedy	'Drug Game'
2009	Travis Cranley (Inside Sport)	'Kiddie Wars'
2010	Mary Gearin – (ABC 7.30 Report)	‘Majak Daw’
2011	Grantlee Kieza (The Courier-Mail)	‘Million Dollar Noby’
2012	Luke Waters (SBS)	‘Race Game’
2013	Will Swanton (The Australian)	'Life saver'
2014	McGuire Media (Foxtel)	‘The Recruit — Indigenous Carnival episode’
2015	Dan Goldberg, Adam Kay and Anthony De Sylva (Mint Pictures and ABC)	‘Pitch battle’
2016	Tim Sheridan and Matt Weiss (Fox Footy)	'From Little Things'
2017	Allyson Horn (ABC)	‘Afghan AFL’

=== Best Journalism on Australian Sports Commission-related Programs ===
Year	Journalists	Comments
2002	Robert Drane (Inside Sport)	Indigenous sport
2003	Janelle Miles (Australian Associated Press)	Athletes blood worth bottling
2004	Jesse Fink (Inside Sport)	‘Silent Witness’
2005	Jacquelin Magnay (Good Weekend Magazine)	Wired World of Sports"
2006	Andrea Ulbrick and Sally Regan (Film Australia)	'Nerves of Steel'

=== Youth Sport Media Award ===
Year	Journalists
2002	Amanda Smith of ABC Radio National
2003	Steve Grove and Tony Thomas (Daily Telegraph)
2004	Shaun Hollis (The Messenger)
