= Paul Kelly – Stories of Me =

Paul Kelly - Stories of Me
- Film poster
- Directed by: Ian Darling
- Produced by: Ian Darling; Susan McKinnon; Mary Macrae
- Starring: Paul Kelly
- Cinematography: Simon Smith
- Edited by: Sally Fryer
- Production company: Shark Island Productions
- Distributed by: Madman Entertainment Aust/Nz
- Release date: 1 October 2012
- Running time: 96 minutes
- Country: Australia
- Language: English

Paul Kelly – Stories of Me is a 2012 Australian documentary film about singer-songwriter Paul Kelly. It was directed by Ian Darling and produced by Shark Island Productions.

The film premiered on 1 October 2012 at the 2012 Melbourne International Film Festival. Before its official cinema release on 25 October 2012, it had a sold-out national tour as special event releases with Kelly and director Ian Darling appearing on stage after the screening. Paul Kelly – Stories of Me was broadcast on the ABC Television on 27 October 2012.

== Synopsis ==
This feature-length documentary explores Kelly's life from his childhood in Adelaide as the sixth of nine children and grandson of two famous opera singers, through to his reputation as one of Australia's best singer-songwriters, with a career spanning more than 30 years. The relationship of Kelly's art to his life and personal journey are revealed, as are the many hurdles he faced along the way. The interview subjects include various members of Kelly's family; many of his fellow musicians and friends, including novelists Richard Flanagan and Fiona Kelly McGregor; film director Rachel Perkins; and musicians Megan Washington and Archie Roach.

== Social impact ==
As part of the film's social impact and educational outreach program, Shark Island Productions and The Caledonia Foundation launched Paul Kelly & The Portraits at the National Portrait Gallery by The Hon Tony Burke MP and Paul Kelly - Portrait of an Artist Schools' Education and Curriculum program by Peter Garrett, developed in association with the English Teachers Association NSW.

The report Music to Our Ears with the Music Council of Australia was commissioned to increase parental engagement to advance music education in schools.

Paul Kelly - The Essays is a companion paperback book and e-book to the film, tracking Kelly's life from aspiring cricketer as a young boy through to his status as one of Australia's most popular musicians.

== Awards and nominations ==
- Won ATOM AWARD (2013) Best Educational/Training Resource (Primary/Secondary)
- Won ATOM AWARD (2013) Best Documentary Arts
- Finalist ATOM AWARD (2013) Best Documentary General
- Finalist ATOM AWARD (2013) Best Documentary Biography
- Won Australian Screen Sound Guild Award (2013) Best Sound in a Documentary
- Won FCCA Award (2012) Best Documentary
- Nominated AACTA Award (2013) Best Sound in a Documentary Paul Charlier
- Nominated ADG Award (2013) Best Documentary Feature Ian Darling
- Won ASE Award (2013) Best Documentary Editing Sally Fryer
- Official Selection at the Melbourne International Film Festival 2012
- Official Selection at the Canberra International Film Festival 2012

== Production ==
Cast

- Paul Kelly (musician)

Production

- Ian Darling as Director
- Sally Fryer ASE as Editor
- Susan Mackinnon as Producer
- Mary Macrae as Producer
- Toby Creswell as Executive Producer
- David Leser as Executive Producer
- Simon Smith as Director of Photography
- Benjamin Cunningham as Cinematographer
- Paul Charlier as Sound Designer and Music Mixer

Music

- Paul Kelly (musician)
