= Alone Across Australia =

- Official film poster
- Directed by: Ian Darling; Jon Muir
- Produced by: Ian Darling; Jon Muir
- Starring: Jon Muir
- Edited by: Sally Fryer
- Music by: Kim Green
- Release date: April 2004 (Full Frame Film Festival)
- Running time: 52 minutes
- Country: Australia
- Language: English

Alone Across Australia is a fifty-two-minute documentary released in 2003, which is based on adventurer Jon Muir's solo and unsupported journey across Australia in 2001. The motion picture introduces Muir and his exploits all over the world, mainly focusing on his journey throughout the Australian continent, from Porte Augusta in South Australia to Burketown in Queensland.

The documentary has three executive producers: Philippa Bateman, Mitchell Block, and James Hersov of Shark Island Production Ltd, Australia. It was written by Muir and Ian Darling, edited by Sally Fryer and the music was supervised by Kim Green. In April 2004, the documentary was broadcast at the Full Frame Festival.

== Background ==
Muir was born in 1961 and grew up in Wollongong, New South Wales, Australia.

He went to Fig Tree High School, where he started becoming interested in rock climbing and mountaineering. He dropped out of high school at 16 years, two years before graduation, to be a professional rock climber.

Muir married his first wife Brigitte Muir but got divorced in 2002. He then began dating his current wife Suzy Muir. The couple currently reside on a 60-hectare property near The Grampians National Park in Western Victoria.

Muir is known for his international and Australian exploits.

=== International achievements ===
Muir climbed and explored the New Zealand and European Alps. He explored both poles during expeditions without animal or technological support. He walked through the South Pole in 1999 and through the North Pole in 2002. He also traversed 6000 km in a kayak in the ocean. (Huntsdale 2017).

Muir participated in the Australian Bicentennial Everest Expedition in 1984 but was unsuccessful at reaching Mount Everest. In 1988, he tried again to reach the summit without sherpa support and became the first man to climb Mount Everest unsupported. After that, he became a tour guide on the mountain. (Huntsdale 2017).

=== Australian achievements ===
His achievements in Australian mainly consist of trekking across extreme conditions over a long distance. Muir completed the first trek barefoot across dry Lake Eyre (Huntsdale 2017).

He walked from the Spencer Gulf, South Australia to the center of Australia unsupported, encompassing 17 000 kilometers. Finally, in 2001, he was the first man to walk 1,650 km across the Australian continent from Port Augusta to Burketown (Huntsdale 2017).

== Content ==
Alone Across Australia shows the journey of Muir from Port Augusta, South Australia to Burketown, Queensland. Seraphine, his Jack Russell, accompanied him during his journey as he walked 2500 kilometres (1600 miles), unsupported (Harvey 2004).

During his trek, he had a cart attached to him to carry the equipment, which comprised fifty-five maps and a compass for direction. Regarding resources, he brought rice and muesli and a gun to defend himself.

He walked without any localization tools or mobile phone. During the trek, he did not have the opportunity to get more supplies (Muir & Darling 2003). Instead, he hunted and gathered food and found water in the Australian Outback. He established a goal of 20 km a day and started walking as soon as the sun was up.

The documentary is divided into several parts and follows Muir as he crosses the Australian Outback (Muir & Darling 2003). The first part includes his crossing of the salt lakes. The second part follows his crossing of the deserts, and the final part follows him crossing the rivers north.

=== Salt Lakes ===
The first natural obstacle that Muir crosses in the film is the salt lakes in South Australia. Due to the lack of available drinking water, the film shows Muir's desalinization process. The second half of this section focuses on Muir's lack of progress for a couple of days due to rain. It was the heaviest rain event in Australia in 14 years. At the end of this part, Muir realized that he was two weeks behind schedule (Muir & Darling 2003).

=== Deserts ===
Muir conquered his second natural challenge: the deserts. These include the Tirari and Simpson deserts. During this expedition, Muir had to pass through the longest dingo fence in Australia. He also encountered the first people of his journey. The documentary includes their testimonies that Muir refused any support. Firstly, he met Malcolm and Colleen Michelle at Muloorina station, followed by John Hammond, at Mungerannie and finally a group of bikers at Adria Downs station, but only Bob Crombie was interviewed. This part also follows some events, including the couple of days off that Muir took to rest in order to finish the walk. It also shows the night where he and Seraphine were attacked by five dingoes, where he was forced to shoot one. He also visited the remains of the Annandale Station (Muir & Darling 2003).

=== North rivers ===
The final section of the documentary shows the last couple of days where the trek crosses the North Rivers. Muir abandoned his cart and reached Burketown with just a backpack. He also lost his sleeping bag, and in order to be able to sleep in the cold, he had to go back to where he left his cart, which caused delay (Muir & Darling 2003).

This section also shows the death of Seraphine, his Jack Russell, who ate a poison bait for dingoes (Muir & Darling 2003). After burying his dog, he had to finish the trek alone.

The last 100 km of Muir's trek was not recorded as his camera failed, but he arrived safely. The film's conclusion shows Muir's 25-kilogram weight loss and troubles with malnutrition (Muir & Darling 2003).

== Production and soundtrack ==
The documentary mainly comprises recorded sequences by Jon Muir himself using his camera during the crossing from South Australia to Queensland. It also includes sequences of his previous attempts and previous achievements around the world. Sequences are followed by interviews with experts and Muir's friends that were filmed during the previous and following years.

The soundtrack for the documentary was supervised by Kim Green. Muir also provided narration over the course of the film.

Interviews with the people he met along his journey were also recorded by Muir himself.

The documentary was edited by Sally Fryer and completed in 2003.

== Broadcast and streaming ==
The documentary was broadcast at the 2004 Annual Full Frame Documentary Film Festival, one year after its release date in 2003. It was also broadcast to 12 different festivals such as The Down Under Film Festival in 2005 and London Australian Film Festival in 2005.

Australian and international sales are owned by Ian Darling.

The documentary was made available online on the streaming platform: DocPlay, Amazon Prime.

== Awards and nominations ==
Jon Muir was awarded the Order of Australia for services to mountaineering and the Australian Geographic Society's Adventurer of the Year in 2002 (French 2016).

Alone Across Australia has been nominated at fourteen international festivals:

- Down Under Film Festival (2005)
- London Australian Film Festival (2005)
- Heartland Film Festival (2005)
- Columbus International Film & Video Festival (2005)
- San Francisco Documentary Film Festival (2004)
- Taos Mountain Film Festival (2004)
- Mezinárodn˘ Festival Horsk˘ch Filmov (2004)
- Kendal Mountain Film Festival (2004)
- Trento International Festival of Mountain and Exploration Films (2004)
- International Festival of Mountain and Adventure Films (2004)
- Heartland Film Festival (2004)
- Graz Mountain Film Festival (2004)
- Dundee Mountain Film Festival (2004)
- Banff Festival of Mountain Films (2004)
