= Life After the Oasis =

Life After The Oasis
- Poster
- Directed by: Sascha Ettinger Epstein
- Produced by: Ian Darling; Mary Macrae
- Edited by: Sally Fryer
- Music by: Rafael May
- Release date: 13 June 2019 (Sydney Film Festival)
- Running time: 78 minutes
- Country: Australia
- Language: English

Life After The Oasis is a 2019 Australian documentary film produced by Shark Island Productions and directed by Sascha Ettinger Epstein.

== Subject ==
Life After The Oasis premiered at Sydney Film Festival in June 2019.

In 2008, feature documentary The Oasis, shocked Australia with its gritty insight into the lives of wayward teens at the Oasis Youth Network, a youth refuge in inner-city Sydney. A decade later, with social inequality and homelessness worse than ever, the original participants reveal where their lives have taken them.

=== Education and outreach ===
Life After The Oasis was broadcast by SBS in 2019.

The education and outreach work around the film builds on the first film. Over the last ten years youth homelessness has not halved, as was pledged with bi-partisan support in 2008, but has increased.

The issue of youth homelessness in Australia gained national media attention in Youth Week 2008 via the release of the National Youth Commission's "Australia's Homeless Youth" report and ABC1's premiere of The Oasis documentary on youth homelessness This report influenced the Australian Governments Green Paper Which Way Home? and the White Paper, which set out the Government's national plan of action.

The roadmap of recommendations developed by the National Youth Commission imagined a truly strategic homelessness response, not just more crisis responses and band-aid measures, but a national effort that would begin to reduce and ultimately end youth homelessness in Australia. Ahead of the film premiere at Sydney Film Festival, a Report Card was presented to the National Youth Homelessness Conference held on 18–19 March 2019. This Report card makes an assessment of how much progress has actually been made since 2008 against the NYC Roadmap's 10 'must do' strategic areas for action. Referencing the NYC Roadmap, the Report Card is a review of responses to youth homelessness over the past decade from a national perspective.

In 2019, Shark Island Institute with YLab Global and supported by The Caledonia Foundation launched The Oasis Homelessness Project. The Project was co-designed with teachers, schools and young people with an experience of homelessness.

== See also ==
- Youth homelessness
