= The Oasis (film) =

- Directed by: Ian Darling, Sascha Ettinger Epstein
- Produced by: Ian Darling
- Release date: 2008
- Running time: 88 minutes
- Country: Australia
- Language: English

The Oasis is a 2008 Australian documentary film produced by Shark Island Productions and directed by Ian Darling and Sascha Ettinger Epstein. The film explores the lives of homeless youth living in the Salvos Oasis youth refuge in Sydney. A 'ten years later' film was published in 2019 - Life After The Oasis.

== Subject ==
Every night, Oasis accommodates 55 homeless and disadvantaged youths. Filmed over two years at The Oasis Youth Support Network refuge run by the Salvation Army in Surry Hills, Australia, the documentary follows Captain Paul Moulds, Robbin Moulds and the daily lives of both the young people and the Salvation Army staff who care for them and work with them to try to make a difference in their lives. The film takes an unflinching look at the difficulties and triumphs that happen each day and night. Many of these young people have ongoing problems with drug abuse; violent and abusive behaviour and resistant to attempts to help. But whatever is happening in their lives, Paul and Robbin Moulds are there to work with them to assist in turning their lives around.

== Impact ==
The issue of youth homelessness in Australia gained national media attention in Youth Week 2008 via the release of the National Youth Commission's "Australia's Homeless Youth" report on 8 April and ABC1's premiere of "The Oasis" documentary on youth homelessness on 10 April, followed by a panel discussed hosted by Tony Jones. This report influenced the Australian Governments Green Paper Which Way Home? and the White Paper, which set out the Government's national plan of action.

Documentary filmmaking as a tool for social change is relatively new to Australia – with philanthropic foundations traditionally reluctant to fund in this area. The Oasis demonstrated the latent power of documentary film to deliver a high return on social capital. More than two years after the initial screening and live panel discussion on ABC Television in April 2008, supported by a comprehensive education and outreach campaign, the documentary has helped ensure that youth homelessness remains on the national agenda.

The partnership with ABC Television was teamed with two major initiatives funded by The Caledonia Foundation: 1) the National Youth Commission (NYC) Report on Youth Homelessness; and 2) a comprehensive education and outreach campaign. The NYC Report was the result of an independent, national inquiry which informed the range of evidence-based recommendations. In 2007, the NYC held 21 days of hearings in all states and territories. Formal evidence was given by 319 individuals and 91 written submissions were received, including seven from government departments. The NYC report launched by Tanya Plibersek at Oasis in 2008 provided context and credibility to images presented by the documentary, it showed that the experience of The Oasis youth was representative of a greater problem, not an isolated case.

The education and outreach campaign based on The Oasis documentary was designed to combine grassroots support for vulnerable young people, with the possibility of effecting long-lasting social change. In 2008, all Australian secondary schools and philanthropic foundations were provided with The Oasis DVD, comprehensive Study Guide and a copy of the NYC Report. The Study Guide was updated in 2010 and is linked to the curriculum of every state and territory.

In 2010, The Caledonia Foundation launched the second phase of its Oasis initiative, with two short films Polly & Me and Wall Boy. The second phase had a specific focus to engage philanthropic and community partners, attempt to raise awareness and encourage early intervention into the issues around child abuse and neglect.

"Robbin and I have been overwhelmed and enormously humbled by the reaction to the documentary. So many people have stopped us on the street, emailed us, rang us, messaged us, wrote to us and encouraged us…Even locals who misunderstood and opposed us have told us they now know what we are trying to achieve and do. Every Salvation Army centre across Australia is reporting increased giving from the public. I sense we have changed the nation."

Captain Paul Moulds, Director, The Oasis Youth Support Network.

Philanthropy Australia established an inaugural Homelessness Affinity Group in Melbourne and Sydney in 2009. The groups aim to share knowledge and build collaborative funding arrangements for projects that address homelessness.

In 2011 The Oasis Homeless Short Film Competition was launched by patron Cate Blanchett and Peter Garrett, encouraging youth to make a three-minute film about any aspect of homelessness.

The Oasis Initiative was listed as one of Top 50 Philanthropic Gifts of All Time by Pro Bono Australia in 2013.

== Awards and nominations ==
=== Wins ===
- Best Direction in a Documentary, Best Editing in a Documentary, AFI Awards 2008
- Best Tertiary Education Resource and Best Educational Multi-Modal Production ATOM Awards 2008
- Special Jury Prize FIFO Tahiti

=== Nominations ===
- Finalist: Best Documentary General, Best Documentary Human Story, Best Documentary Social and Political Issues, Best Education Multimodal Production ATOM Awards 2008
- Best Documentary Logie Awards 2009
- Finalist: Walkley Awards 2008
- Best Documentary and Best Sound non-feature AFI Awards 2008
- Best Direction ADG Awards 2008
- Best Documentary IF Awards 2008
- Social Justice Award for Documentary Santa Barbara International Film Festival 2009

== See also ==
- Homelessness in Australia
- Youth homelessness
