= Shark Island Productions =

Australian film company

- Industry: Documentary
- Founded: 2001
- Headquarters: Sydney, Australia
- Key people: Ian Darling, Sally Fryer, Mary Macrae, Malinda Wink
- Website: Official website

Shark Island Productions is a documentary film production company based in Sydney, Australia, creates extensive education, outreach and community engagement campaigns with its films. It is the production arm of Shark Island Institute.

== The company ==
Shark Island Productions film production company based in Sydney that focuses on making documentaries. established in 2001 by Ian Darling.

Shark Island Productions is a certified B corporation Company that meets standards of social and environmental performance, and is carbon-neutral since 2014.

== Shark Island Institute ==
Through Shark Island Institute, the company builds partnerships with foundations, philanthropists, and not-for-profit organisations to raise awareness and make a social impact.

The organisation partnered with BRITDOC and the Sundance Documentary Film Program to bring GoodPitch^{2} Australia to the Sydney Opera House in 2014, 2015 and 2016, an international forum that connect filmmakers with foundations, financiers, not-for-profits, philanthropists and policy-makers. Money is raised in philanthropic grants for funding social impact documentaries and powerful strategic partnerships between community groups, the corporate sector, NGOs and policy-makers are formed.

Supported documentaries from the Good Pitch slate include That Sugar Film, Frackman, Gayby Baby, Zach's Ceremony, The Hunting Ground, Whiteley (about Australian artist Brett Whiteley) and Constance On the Edge.

Shark Island Institute works with international documentary filmmakers in The Portfolio, resulting in films such as The Hunting Ground, The Bleeding Edge, The Fourth Estate, Inventing Tomorrow, 2040, Unrest, How to Change the World and Bully.

== Films ==
=== The Final Quarter (2019) ===
The Final Quarter premiered at the 2019 Sydney Film Festival, where it was an official selection, and had five further on-demand screenings. It was also screened at the 2019 Perth International Film Festival and Castlemaine Documentary Film Festivals. It then went to broadcast with Channel 10 on 18 July 2019.

The film was nominated for several awards and won a number of those.

=== Life After the Oasis (2019) ===
Life After the Oasis reflects on the last decade with original participants from the 2008 ABC TV documentary The Oasis. It premiered at the 2019 Sydney Film Festival, and was broadcasts on SBS Television on 10 November 2019.

=== Suzy & the Simple Man (2016) ===
Suzy & the Simple Man was screened as official selection at the following film festivals:

- Sydney Film Festival 2016 (premiere)
- Melbourne International Film Festival 2016

Official Selection at Mountainfilm 2017

- Byron Bay Film Festival 2017
- Earth Talks International Film Festival 2017
- Bali International Film Festival 2017
- Wild & Scenic Film Festival 2018

=== Stories From The Inside (2013) ===
In Stories From The Inside (2013), a group of first time offenders reveal the crimes that led to their incarceration into the Youth Unit at Port Phillip Prison. The inmates tell their stories around the choices, mistakes and the effects of their actions on themselves, families and victims, and discuss the harsh reality of prison life, the daily grind, boredom, depression, and the fear of rejection when they return to the outside world. Made in association with Igniting Change, the film and study guide is made available as a free resource for all schools in Australia.

=== Paul Kelly – Stories of Me (2012) ===
Paul Kelly – Stories of Me, about the musician Paul Kelly, was in the official selection at the 2012 Melbourne International Film Festival and Canberra International Film Festival, and was broadcast on ABC Television on 27 October 2012. It was nominated for and won several awards.

=== The Soldier (2011) ===
The Soldier is a short film directed by Ian Darling and Sascha Ettinger-Epstein. It is about an 80-year-old volunteer who has worked for The Salvation Army since 1949. He was then receptionist at their youth refuge, Oasis. It was an official selection and won a Special Mention as Best Australian Documentary at the Antenna Documentary Festival.

=== Polly and Me (2010) ===
In Polly and Me is a short film released in 2010. An eight-year-old girl lives alone with her mother and dreams of a better life beyond the walls of their small and dingy apartment. Isolated and lonely, the girl's only friend is her doll, Polly. The film was launched on ABC Television on 9 September 2010, during Child Protection Week, followed by a live audience discussion hosted by Geraldine Doogue.

Polly and Me is endorsed by leading family and child abuse prevention organisations including: Australian Research Alliance for Children and Youth, Benevolent Society, CREATE Foundation, Good Beginnings, Families Australia, Lighthouse Foundation, Lou's Place, Mirabel Foundation, National Association for Prevention of Child Abuse and Neglect, The Salvation Army, and The Smith Family.

It was nominated Best Achievement in Sound for a Short Fiction Film ASSG Award 2010.

=== Wall Boy (2010) ===

Wall Boy is a 17-minute drama written and directed by Sascha Ettinger Epstein, depicting the role of Salvation Army officers in rescuing a rent boy from his pimp after he requested assistance, and is claimed to be "based on a true story". The film was sponsored by the Caledonia Foundation for the Salvation Army.

The film was introduced by Salvation Army Officer Paul Moulds.

Cast:
Tom Keegan Joyce
Youth Worker 1 Ben Wood
Youth Worker 2 Danny Adcock
Pimp Terry Serio

Original music was composed by Felicity Fox

For Wall Boy, Nicola Daley was given an award for Cinematography in the Fiction Drama Shorts at the Australian Cinematographers Society. Official Selection at Santa Barbara Film Festival, Ojai Film Festival, L.A Shortsfest, NYC International Film Festival, Korea Asiana Film Festival.

=== The Oasis (2008) ===
The Oasis was filmed over two years at The Oasis Youth Support Network refuge run by the Salvation Army in Surry Hills, Sydney, to highlight youth homelessness in Australia.

It was broadcast on ABC Television on 10 April 2008, and won a number of awards.

In 2011 The Oasis Homeless Short Film Competition was launched by patron Cate Blanchett, encouraging youth to make a three-minute film about any aspect of homelessness.

=== In The Company of Actors (2007) ===
In The Company of Actors was screened in the Official Selections of the Sydney Film Festival in 2007; Melbourne International Film Festival, Vancouver International Film Festival, St Tropez Internationales du Cinema des Antiodes, Santa Barbara International Film Festival, Mumbai International Film Festival, OzFliz Ontario, London Australian Film Festival, River Run International Film Festival.. It was broadcast in Australia on ABC1 February 2008.

The film and study guide package was donated to English, drama, and media departments in all secondary schools across Australia, with support from the Caledonia Foundation.

=== Alone Across Australia (2003) ===
Alone Across Australia has won more than 25 awards, and has screened at over 60 international film festivals. It was listed as one of the 20 Best Adventure DVDs of all Time by Men's Journal magazine in the US.

It was broadcast on the ABC on 8 September 2004.

It was voted one of the "20 Best Adventure Films of All Time" Men's journal Magazine, USA, and was the winner of 32 international film festival awards and official selection in over 30 film festivals around the world.

=== Woodstock for Capitalists (2001) ===
Woodstock for Capitalists was about a millionaire's convention in Omaha, Nebraska, at which "15,000 fanatical shareholders gather to pay homage to their hero Warren Buffett".

It was broadcast on ABC Television on 15 March 2001.

It won the 2001 CINE Golden Eagle Award, and was selected to screen at Hot Springs Documentary Film Festival; Columbus International Film Festival; York Independent Film Festival; Pennsylvania Film Festival; Newport International Film Festival; Maui Film Festival; and Tahoe International Film Festival.

== Social impact ==
All Shark Island Productions films have education and outreach initiatives built around them. The Documentary film The Oasis had the most extensive outreach campaign of any film made in Australia and The Oasis Initiative was listed as one of Top 50 Philanthropic Gifts of All Time by Pro Bono Australia in 2013. The issue of youth homelessness in Australia gained national media attention in Youth Week 2008 via the release of the National Youth Commission's “Australia’s Homeless Youth” report on 8 April and ABC1’s premiere of The Oasis documentary on youth homelessness on 10 April, followed by a panel discussed hosted by Tony Jones. This report influenced the Australian Governments Green Paper Which Way Home? and the White Paper, which set out the Government's national plan of action. The partnership with ABC Television was teamed with two major initiatives funded by The Caledonia Foundation: 1) the National Youth Commission (NYC) Report on Youth Homelessness; and 2) a comprehensive education and outreach campaign.

The NYC Report was the result of an independent, national inquiry which informed the range of evidence-based recommendations. In 2007, the NYC held 21 days of hearings in all states and territories. Formal evidence was given by 319 individuals and 91 written submissions were received, including seven from government departments. The NYC report launched by Tanya Plibersek at Oasis in 2008 provided context and credibility to images presented by the documentary, it showed that the experience of The Oasis youth was representative of a greater problem, not an isolated case.

The companion short films POLLY AND ME and WALL BOY involved Community Partners and Philanthropic Partners to widen the outreach of the films and broaden community discussion of the issues of addiction, abuse and neglect. The three films provoke much discussion about dealing with complex social problems, and raise issues about the adequacy of service levels surrounding prevention and response programs in the community.

An outreach and education initiative with The Caledonia Foundation launched Paul Kelly & The Portraits at the National Portrait Gallery by The Hon Tony Burke MP and Paul Kelly - Portrait of an Artist Schools' Education and Curriculum program by The Hon Peter Garrett AM and developed with the English Teachers Association NSW. The report Music to Our Ears with the Music Council of Australia was commissioned to increase parental engagement to advance music education in schools. The report Music to Our Ears with the Music Council of Australia was commissioned to increase parental engagement to advance music education in schools.

== Awards ==
Year	Award	Category	Title	Result
2019	AACTA	Sally Fryer - Best Editing in a Documentary	The Final Quarter	Won
2019	AACTA	Best Documentary 2019	The Final Quarter	Nominated
2019	Australian Screen Editors Guild	Sally Fryer - Best Editing in a Documentary Feature	The Final Quarter	Won
2019	Film Critics Circle of Australia	Best Documentary	The Final Quarter	Won
2019	Australian Human Rights Commission	Racism. It Stops With Me Award	The Final Quarter	Won
2019	Asian Academy Creative Award	Best Documentary - Regional	The Final Quarter	Won
2019	Asian Academy Creative Award	Best Documentary - Grand Final	The Final Quarter	Won
2019	Sport Australia Media Awards	Best Documentary	The Final Quarter	Won
2019	Walkley Awards	Television Current Affairs, Documentary Feature or Broadcast	The Final Quarter	Finalist
2019	Australian Screen Sound Guild	Best Sound for a Documentary	The Final Quarter	Nominated
2019	Screen Producers Australia Awards	Documentary Feature of the Year	The Final Quarter	Finalist
2018	AACTA Byron Kennedy Award	Outstanding creative enterprise within the film and television industries	Ian Darling	Won
2013	ATOM Awards	Best Educational/Training Resource (Primary/Secondary)	Paul Kelly - Stories of Me	Won
2013	ATOM Awards	Best Documentary Arts	Paul Kelly - Stories of Me	Won
2013	ATOM Awards	Best Documentary General	Paul Kelly - Stories of Me	Finalist
2013	ATOM Awards	Best Documentary Biography	Paul Kelly - Stories of Me	Finalist
2013	Australian Directors Guild Award	Ian Darling - Best Documentary Feature	Paul Kelly - Stories of Me	Nominated
2013	Australian Academy of Cinema and Television Arts	Best Sound in a Documentary	Paul Kelly - Stories of Me	Nominated
2013	Australian Screen Sound Guild	Best Sound for a Documentary	Paul Kelly - Stories of Me	Won
2012	Film Critics Circle of Australia	Best Documentary	Paul Kelly - Stories of Me	Won
2012	Australian Screen Editors Guild	Sally Fryer - Best Editing in a Documentary Feature	Paul Kelly - Stories of Me	Won
2010	Australian Screen Sound Guild	Best Achievement in Sound for a Short Fiction Film	Polly and Me	Nominated
2008	Australian Film Institute	Ian Darling and Sascha Ettinger Epstein - Best Direction in a Documentary	The Oasis	Won
2008	Australian Film Institute	Best Editing in a Documentary	The Oasis	Won
2008	ATOM Awards	Best Tertiary Education Resource	The Oasis	Won
2008	ATOM Awards	Best Multimodal Production	The Oasis	Won
2008	ATOM Awards	Best Documentary General	The Oasis	Finalist
2008	ATOM Awards	Best Documentary Human Story	The Oasis	Finalist
2008	ATOM Awards	Best Documentary Social and Political Issues	The Oasis	Finalist
2008	ATOM Awards	Best Education Multimodal Production	The Oasis	Finalist
2008	Australian Directors Guild Award	Ian Darling, Sasha Ettinger Epstein - Best Direction in a Documentary	The Oasis	Nominated
2008	FIFO	Special Jury Prize	The Oasis	Won
2008	Australian Film Institute Awards	Best Documentary	The Oasis	Nominated
2008	Australian Film Institute Awards	Best Sound	The Oasis	Nominated
2008	Inside Film Awards	Best Documentary	The Oasis	Nominated
2008	Walkley Awards	Television Current Affairs, Documentary Feature or Broadcast	The Oasis	Finalist
2009	Logie Awards	Best Documentary	The Oasis	Finalist
2005	CINE Golden Eagle Award	Documentary	Alone Across Australia	Won
2005	Santa Barbara International Film Festival	Special Jury Award	Alone Across Australia	Won
2004	Heartland Film Festival	Crystal Heart Award	Alone Across Australia	Won
2004	San Francisco Docfest	Audience Award	Alone Across Australia	Won
2004	BANFF Mountain Film Festival	People's Choice Award, Best Mountain Film	Alone Across Australia	Won
2001	CINE Golden Eagle Award	Documentary	Woodstock For Capitalists	Won

== Distribution ==
Shark Island documentaries are available for home use online at their website, through ABC shops and distributors Roadshow Entertainment and Madman Entertainment.
