= Antenna Documentary Film Festival =

- Location: Sydney, Australia
- Founded: 2011
- Website: antennafestival.org

Antenna Documentary Film Festival was established in 2011. It is an international documentary film festival held annually every October in Sydney, Australia. The festival was set up to promote documentary as an art form, with programming focusing on independent and innovative filmmaking that breaks new ground in the documentary landscape.

Films that have had their national or local premieres at Antenna include Minding the Gap, Aquarelle, Cameraperson, Grace Jones: Bloodlight and Bami, Web Junkie, Faces Places, Mr Gay Syria, 5 Broken Cameras, Leviathan and Virunga.

In addition to film screenings, the festival's program includes talks, masterclasses, and industry-focused events, offering a space for the documentary community to get together to network, learn and develop their filmmaking practices. The 9th Antenna Documentary Film Festival was held between 17 and 27 October 2019.

== Awards ==
Antenna have three competitive sections; Award for Best International Documentary, Award for Best Australian Documentary and Award for Best Australian Short Documentary.

Award for Best International Documentary

Year	Film/s	Director/s	Country
2018	Happy Winter	Giovanni Totaro	Italy
2018	América (Special Mention)	Erick Stoll & Chase Whiteside	USA
2017	Small Talk	Hui-chen Huang	Taiwan
2016	Behemoth	Zhao Liang	China
2016	Starless Dreams (Special Jury Award)	Mehrdad Oskouei	Iran
2015	Spartacus & Cassandra	Ioanis Nuguet	France
2014	Waiting for August	Teodora Mihai	Romania
2013	Let The Fire Burn	Jason Osder	USA
2012	Planet of Snail	Seung-jun Yi	South Korea
2011	Into Eternity	Michael Madsen	Denmark

Award for Best Australian Documentary

Year	Film/s	Director/s
2018	The Scribe	Ruth Cullen
2018	Two Wolves (Special Mention)	Example
2017	Kings of Baxter	Jack Yabsley
2016	Mother With a Gun	Jeff Daniels
2015	Shock Room	Kathryn Millard
2015	Another Country (Special Mention)	Molly Reynolds
2014	Sons & Mothers	Christopher Houghton
2014	The Land Between (Special Mention)	David Fedele
2013	The Dark Matter of Love	Sarah McCarthy
2012	My Thai Bride	David Tucker
2012	The Soldier (Special Mention)	Sascha Ettinger Epstein & Ian Darling
2011	The Triangle Wars	Rosie Jones

Award for Best Australian Short Documentary

Year	Film/s	Director/s
2018	Handout	Vedrana Music
2018	Barbara (Special Mention)	Larissa Behrendt
2017	Wolfe	Claire Randall
2017	Marrimarrigun (Special Mention)	Kimberly West
2016	Heart Of The Queen (shared)	Matthew Walker
2016	Lightning Ridge: The Land Of The Black Opals (shared)	Alena Lodkina
2015	Maratus	Simon Cunich
2014	Ghost Train	James Fleming & Kelly Hucker
2014	Sticky (Special Mention)	Jilli Rose
2013	E-Wasteland	David Fedele
2012	Feel Home	Lee Blignaut
2011	Ol’ Blue Eyes	Matt Cooney
