= Brigitte Muir =

Belgian-born Australian mountain climber (born 1958)

Personal information
- Born: Brigitte Leonce Suzanne Koch; 8 September 1958 (age 68) Ougrée, Seraing, Belgium
- Spouse: Eric Renz

Climbing career
- Major ascents: Mount Everest (1997); Seven Summits (1997); Shivling (1986)

Brigitte Leonce Suzanne Muir OAM (born 8 September 1958) is a Belgian-born Australian mountain climber. Her climbing career spanned over thirty years.

== Early life and education ==
Muir was born Brigitte Koch in Ougrée, Belgium.

== Climbing career ==
In 1986, she made, with husband at the time Jon Muir and friend Graeme Hill, the first ascent of the South West Pillar of Shivling in Northern India.

On the 27th of May 1997, she became the first Australian woman to summit Mount Everest. and the first Australian, male or female, to climb the Seven Summits (the highest summit on each of the continents).

In 1998, Penguin (Viking) published her autobiography, The Wind in My Hair.

In 2008, SBS broadcast The Eighth Summit, a documentary directed and produced by wife and husband team Anne and Wayne Tindall, and based on Brigitte’s life.

After her career in mountaineering and adventure, Brigitte became a film maker and an inspirational speaker. She leads community building treks in the village of Lura in Eastern Nepal, where she started a women’s literacy and empowerment program.

== Awards and citations ==
- Australian Geographic Society Spirit of Adventure Awards, 1997
- Australia Day Achievers Award 1998
- Order of Australia Medal, for services to mountaineering, 2000
- Centenary Medal, For service to Australia through mountaineering, 2001
- Victorian Honour Roll of Women, 2001

== Bibliography ==
- Ross MacDowell, Inside Story. 20 Famous Australians Tell Their Story, Hobson Dell, Brighton, 2001
- Susan Geason, Australian Heroines, stories of courage and survival, ABC Books, Sydney, 2001
- Martin Flanagan, Faces in the Crowd, One Day Hill, 2004
- Everest. Reflections from the Top. Edited by Christine Gee, Garry Weare and Margaret Gee, Rider, 2003.

== Other sources ==
- https://web.archive.org/web/20130430153031/http://www.curriculum.edu.au/cce/default.asp?id=17576
- http://www.girlsoutdoors.org/profiles/brigitte_muir_-_mountaineering/
- http://whoswhowomen.com.au/profile/brigitte-muir/
