= Aaron Kearney =

Australian broadcaster and journalist

Aaron Kearney OAM
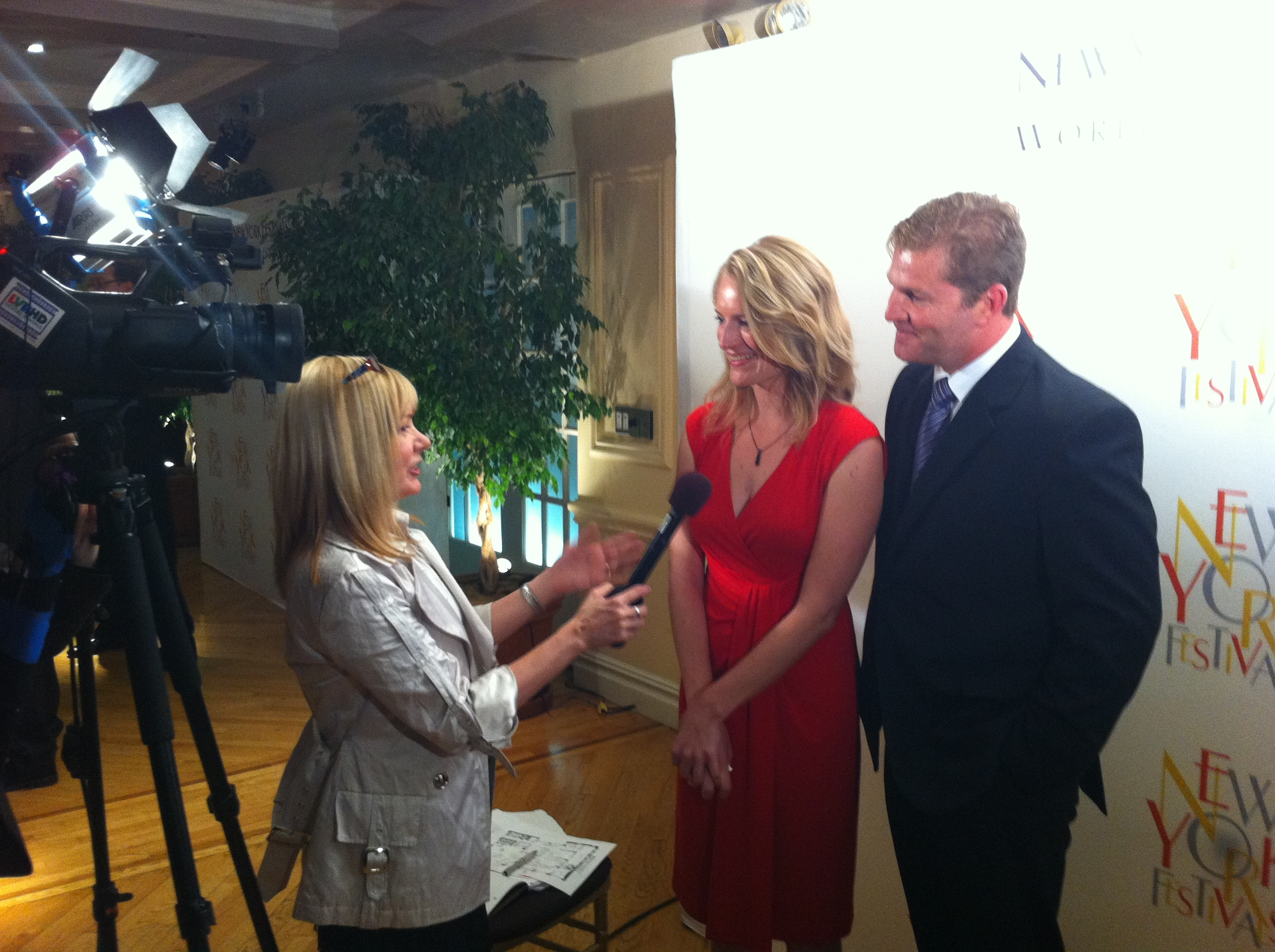
- Born: 3 July 1971 (age 55)
- Occupations: Broadcaster, journalist, sports commentator

Aaron Kearney OAM (born 3 July 1971) is an Australian broadcaster, journalist, sports commentator and the 44th MEAA Prodi Journalist of the Year.

He has covered the Olympics, to the FIFA and Rugby League World Cups and AFC Champions League and Commonwealth Games.

He is the creator of a 'Sports Broadcast for Development Commentary' system used at the 2019 FIFA Women's World Cup in France. It was first adopted in Australian indigenous communities in Tiwi Islands and later the basis for Pacific-wide coverage of the 2015 Pacific Games in Papua New Guinea.

On 7 June 2020, he was awarded the Medal of the Order of Australia for service to the broadcast media as a radio presenter.

He works in media consultancy, sports diplomacy and broadcast development in Australia and overseas.

== Early years ==
Born in Newcastle, Kearney is the son of journalist Malcolm Kearney and Pennie Kearney, a former schoolteacher and now Chief Executive of welfare organisation Mai-Wel.

Kearney's family moved to Woodville, near Maitland when he was five years old. He has three younger sisters. Kearney was school captain of St Peter's High School and earlier attended Maitland Marist Brothers and St John's Primary School.

He studied Communications at the University of Newcastle, Australia and holds a master's degree and Graduate Certificate in Communications from Griffith University, Australia.

== Early career ==
Kearney began his career as a cadet journalist for Fairfax Media in 1990 and was the Chief Writer and co- Editor of the Hunter Valley Weekend newspaper before joining Prime Television's fledgling Hunter news service in 1993, working as a police a political reporter before becoming the Sports presenter.

Kearney has had the opportunity to cover a range of sports across Australian media. In 2000, Kearney was the chief reporter for Prime's Olympic Team at the Sydney Olympics, and sports presenter and sports editor for Prime Television from 1994 to 2001.

He was also master of ceremonies for the arrival of the Olympic Torch in the Hunter in front of an estimated crowd of 50,000.

He has previously presented and produced Pirate TV, a television show about the now-defunct Hunter Pirates basketball club, and provided radio commentary for National Basketball League games.

Kearney hosted a popular sports/talk drive time program on 2HD from 2001 to 2003, and was a sports correspondent for Austereo Stations KOFM and NXFM in the early 2000s.

His works as a documentary producer and presenter include 'Inner Mongolia' – a one-hour documentary tracing a four-wheel drive expedition from the far south to the northernmost regions of Asia, 'Hunter Holidays' – a Getaway style program that was co-hosted with well-known Australian presenter Penny Cook, 'Knight Fever' – a one-hour documentary tracing the Newcastle Knights historic win in the 1997 Australian Rugby League Grand Final, and 'Cape Town to Cairo – The Ultimate African Safari.'

== Radio and sport career ==
Kearney joined the ABC in 2005, initially presenting 1233 ABC Newcastle's Drive radio program and moving on to present the Breakfast program in 2007.

In 2011, the program returned its best ratings in 30 years, beating the main talk rival for the first time.

During his time as an ABC Newcastle radio host, Kearney was also a sports commentator for the ABC, having called a range of major sports from the Asian Cup of football (soccer) and FIFA World Cup, to the Rugby League World Cup and National Rugby League. This commentary work was recognised by ABC Radio with an Outstanding Contribution to Sport Award in 2006.

In July 2011, he was awarded a Gold Medal at the World Radio Awards in New York City for 'Andrew's Story, a documentary on a young paraplegic man from the Hunter.

During his time on 1233's Breakfast program, Kearney has been nominated for 30 media awards, has won a Walkley Award for Best Use of Media, and was nominated for a Best Radio Reporting Walkley for work covering devastating storms that hit eastern Australia in June, 2007.

Kearney is also a freelance writer, with his work appearing in Fairfax Media, football website The Roar and ABC's The Drum. This freelance work was recognised when he was awarded the MEAA Prodi for Best Print Feature Writing 2011 for an ANZAC feature carried by the Fairfax press and the MEAA Prodi Best Specialist Journalist.

The judges said: "Aaron Kearney is a deserving winner of this award: he has demonstrated considerable talent, extending across media with apparent fearlessness and aptitude. [He] writes with style and verve, shares an intrinsic sense of sentiment and nuance, and challenges modern ideology."

Kearney's 2011 piece "Apocalyptic Hyperbole Leave Journalism Speechless" is a widely cited in journalistic and academic circles.

Additionally, as a freelance reporter, his work has been carried by SkyNews Australia, C7 Sports Network, TV3 New Zealand, the BBC and NBC America.

Kearney worked alongside Matildas goalkeeper Melissa Barbieri as play-by-play commentator of ABC TV's W-League coverage in late 2012, while regular commentator Peter Wilkins was calling Champions League Hockey. Kearney is the creator of a Sports Commentary Training Course that has been adopted by the Papua New Guinea National Broadcasting Corporation and by indigenous broadcasters in the Tiwi Islands. An article on his course was featured in the June 2013 edition of industry journal, Walkley Magazine.

Kearney was a finalist for Travel Writer of the Year at the Kennedy Awards for "Kicking Tiwi Goals", written for Fairfax.

He released a CD, Kokoda – Steps to Healing, after completing the Kokoda Track in 2008.

1233's Breakfast Story Box interview segment was named the Best Two-Way Telephone Talk Interview Show at the 2013 New York Festival Radio Awards. Kearney handed a telephone to a listener in May 2012 and it has been passed from one person to another each day ever since. Each recipient is interview by Kearney live on his show.

In early 2016, Kearney transferred from ABC Newcastle to ABC International.

Here he developed a sports broadcast for development commentary system called 'Commentary for Good'. It was first adopted in Australian Indigenous communities in the Tiwi Islands and then used for the Pacific-wide coverage of the 2015 Pacific Games in Papua New Guinea.

It will be used again at the FIFA Women's World Cup in 2019.

He has also created Sport Storytelling programs that have been adopted in six Pacific nations.

His work on the Pacific Sports Partnerships earned two New York Festival World Radio Awards for Best Sports Coverage and Best News Report/Feature and two nominations, including Best Digital Sports Coverage, at the Australian Sports Commission Media Awards.

== Media consultancy and sports diplomacy ==
In April 2019, Kearney left his full time role at ABC Newcastle to start a media and sports diplomacy consultancy AKS Media International.

Kearney has worked for the Griffith Asia Institute as a Sports Diplomacy researcher.

His 'Sports Broadcast for Development Commentary' system will be used at the 2019 FIFA Women's World Cup in France.

== Personal life ==
He has two daughters and is married to ABC and former BBC journalist Karen "Kip" Shrosbery.

== Awards ==
- 2020 Medal of the Order of Australia for service to the broadcast media as a radio presenter.
- 2019 AIPS Sports Awards – Switzerland – Audio Silver – Orchids Bloom
- 2018 UNESCO Photography Award
- 2018 Bronze Medal – New York Festival Radio Awards 2018 for "World's Best Radio Programs" – Best Sports Feature
- 2017 – Australian Sports Commission Media Awards – Finalist – Best Coverage of Sport for People with a Disability.
- Bronze Medal – New York Festival Radio Awards 2017 for "World's Best Radio Programs" – Best Sports Coverage
- Australian Sports Commission Media Awards – Finalist – Best Coverage of a Sport by an Individual
- Silver Medal – New York Festival Radio Awards 2015 for "World's Best Radio Programs" – Social Issues
- Kennedy Awards – Travel Writer of the Year 2013 – Finalist
- Silver Medal – New York Festival Radio Awards 2013 for "World's Best Radio Programs" – Best Two-WayTelephone Talk Interview Show
- Gold Medal – New York Festival Radio Awards 2011 for "World's Best Radio Programs".
- Walkley Award – Best Use of Media – 52nd Walkley Awards for Excellence in Journalism
- MEAA Prodi Journalist of the Year 2011
- MEAA Prodi Best Print Feature Writing 2011
- MEAA Prodi Best Specialist Journalist 2011
- MEAA Prodi Best Radio Journalist 2011
- MEAA Prodi Best Radio Current Affairs Special 2011
- ABC Radio Best Use of Medium Finalist 2011
- Commonwealth Government Sports Achievement Award – 1233 Challenge Cup – 2011
- Yooralla Media Award – Best Radio Documentary – 2011
- Two-time winner Australian Sports Commission Media Award for football coverage/commentary – 2007 and 2009
- ABC Radio 2010 Broadcaster of the Year Finalist
- Walkley Award Nominee – Radio News Reporting – 52nd Walkley Awards for Excellence in Journalism- for coverage of June Long weekend Storms
- ABC Radio Award – Outstanding Contribution to Sport −2006
- 2009 MEAA Prodi Awards – 2009 Radio Journalist of the Year
- 2009 MEAA Prodi Awards – Radio Current Affairs Special of the Year
- Paul Bodington Award for Outstanding Radio Feature/Package 2009
- 2009 Voiceless Media Awards – Finalist
- ABC Radio – Program of the Year Finalist – 2008
- OPSO Media Award – Inter-Generational Journalism- 2008
- ABC Radio Award – Best New Talent finalist – 2006
- Key contributor to ABC Radio Metropolitan Station of the Year Award won by 1233.
- Australian Deaf Association Clear Speech Award – First Sports Presenter to win the award in 30 years – previously won by the likes of Trish Goddard and Ross Symonds
- Australian Lawn Bowls Reporter of the Year
- Speedway Journalist of the Year
- Australian Journalists' Association Highly Commended Sports Feature of the Year
- Australian Journalists' Association Prodi Sports Feature Writer of the Year
- Australian Journalists' Association PF Adams Prize for Cadet Journalist of the Year
