= Peter Lalor (journalist) =

Australian journalist

Peter Lalor is an Australian journalist and author.

== Biography ==
Lalor was born in Bendigo, Victoria and attended University of Melbourne. He worked as a journalist for News Limited for 30 years - initially as a news and feature reporter and then as The Australian chief cricket writer. Lalor played cricket in his youth but ceased playing when he moved to Melbourne to study.

== Career ==
His first Test series in “cricket writer” capacity alone was 2004. Lalor retired as The Australian's chief cricket writer in February 2024. He provides commentary for Channel 7 and SEN. Lalor and fellow The Australian journalist Gideon Haigh produced the cricket podcast "Cricket, Et Al".

He has written biographies on Phillip Hughes and Ron Barassi, Australian murderer Katherine Knight, the history of the Sydney Harbour Bridge and beer. He is a member of the Chappell Foundation Board that raises funds for youth homelessness in Australia.

== Incidents ==
In 2019, he was overcharged for a beer and paid £55,000 before realising the mistake. The bar eventually reimbursed him.

In February 2025, Lalor was sacked by radio station SEN for his social media posts about the Gaza genocide, with CEO Craig Hutchinson claiming that his posts "made Jewish people in Melbourne feel unsafe". Lalor said he "didn’t want anyone to feel unsafe. Of course, I care. I have friends who are frightened and have heard the fear in their voices during conversations. It is an awful situation. But so is Gaza". He was supported by Usman Khawaja, who said "Standing up for the people of Gaza is not antisemitic nor does it have anything to do with my Jewish brothers and sisters in Australia, but everything to do with the Israeli government and their deplorable actions". Khawaja refused an interview with Lalor's former radio station in June 2025 because of its treatment of Lalor.

== Journalism Awards ==
- 2003 - Ned Kelly Award for Best True Crime in 2003
- 2006 - Australian Sports Commission Media Awards - Best Print Profile "'Mongrel Streak' (The Australian)
- 2018 - Kennedy Foundation Peter Frilingos Award – Outstanding Sport Reporting (The Australian)

== Books ==
- Australian beer yarns / edited by Peter Lalor. Sydney, HarperCollins, 2002.
- Blood stain by Peter Lalor. Sydney, Allen and Unwin, 2002.
- The Bridge: the epic story of an Australian icon—the Sydney Harbour Bridge by Peter Lalor. Sydney, Allen and Unwin, 2005.
- Barass : the biography by Peter Lalor. Sydney, Allen and Unwin, 2010.
- Phillip Hughes the official biography by Malcolm Knox and Peter Lalor. Sydney, Pan MacMillan Australia, 2015.
