= Nikki Visser =

Australian television personality and former model

- Born: 24 March 1975 (age 51); Broken Hill, New South Wales, Australia
- Modeling information
- Height: 5 ft 10 in (178 cm)
- Hair color: blonde
- Eye color: blue

Nikki Visser (born 24 March 1975) is an Australian former model and television personality. She is most famous for her cover appearances in Inside Sport, FHM and Ralph magazines during the 1990s and early 2000s.

== Early life ==
Born in Broken Hill, Nikki Visser was raised in Adelaide. At age four, she began dancing classes that she took until she was 17. Her early interest was watching and playing sport, particularly softball, which she played for six years, coached by her mother. Visser also supported the Adelaide Crows in the Australian Football League.

== Biography ==
Visser was first noticed as a cheerleader for the Adelaide 36ers, but rose to fame in 1993, when at 18 she was crowned Miss Calendar Girl Australia, after receiving the highest number of votes by the people who had bought the calendars.

Later in 1993, Visser won the Miss Calendar Girl International competition held in Atlantic City, USA where one of the presiding judges was billionaire businessman and celebrity Donald Trump.

In 1994, a 19-year-old Visser was named by Australian men's magazine Ralph as Australia's sexiest woman. Shortly afterwards, she followed that title with a fourth placing in the world only beaten by megastars such as Denise Richards and Jennifer Lopez in Ralph's 101 sexiest women on the planet.

Visser appeared regularly as a co-host on Channel Seven's The Crows Show in Adelaide during 1996. Around this time, Visser also became the television face of Forty Winks, a bedding and bedroom furniture specialist.

In March 1997, Visser was voted the Inside Sport Sportsmodel of the Year and was a finalist in the Inside Sport Model of the Year Contest in 2001. She has appeared on the cover of Inside Sport four times; July 1996, July 1998, April 1999 and March 2002. On 27 September 1997, she won the Venus Swimwear International Model Search held in Florida, USA.

After an overseas holiday in 1997, Visser moved to Melbourne permanently in early 1998 to further her career. Shortly after relocating to Melbourne, Visser established a Day Spa in Hawthorn, specialising in solariums, body waxes, and sports massage. Visser also graduated from Tanya Powell's Model Agency in Melbourne and subsequently became a Sale of the Century hostess.

In late 1999, Visser played the role of Katie Freeman in several episodes of Neighbours. That same year, she also starred in a very successful TV commercial for Rev Milk. She also landed the role of television presenter with OzLotto on Wednesday nights.

In 2004, Visser had a small role in the Australian film comedy Thunderstruck.

== Career highlights ==
- Miss Calendar Girl Australia – 1993.
- Miss Calendar Girl International - 1993.
- Inside Sport's Sportsmodel of the Year – 1997.
- Venus International Model Search - 1997.
- Inside Sport Cover Girl – July 1996, July 1998, April 1999, March 2002.
- Ralph Magazine's Australia's Sexiest Woman – 1994.
- Rev Milk TV advert - 1999.
- Ralph Magazine Cover Girl – May 2002.
- Ralph Magazine 200 Sexiest Women – #18 in 2002.
- OzLotto television presenter.
- Face of Forty Winks.
- Sale of the Century hostess.
- Role in film Thunderstruck - 2004.
