= Elizabeth Wright (swimmer) =

Australian Paralympic swimmer

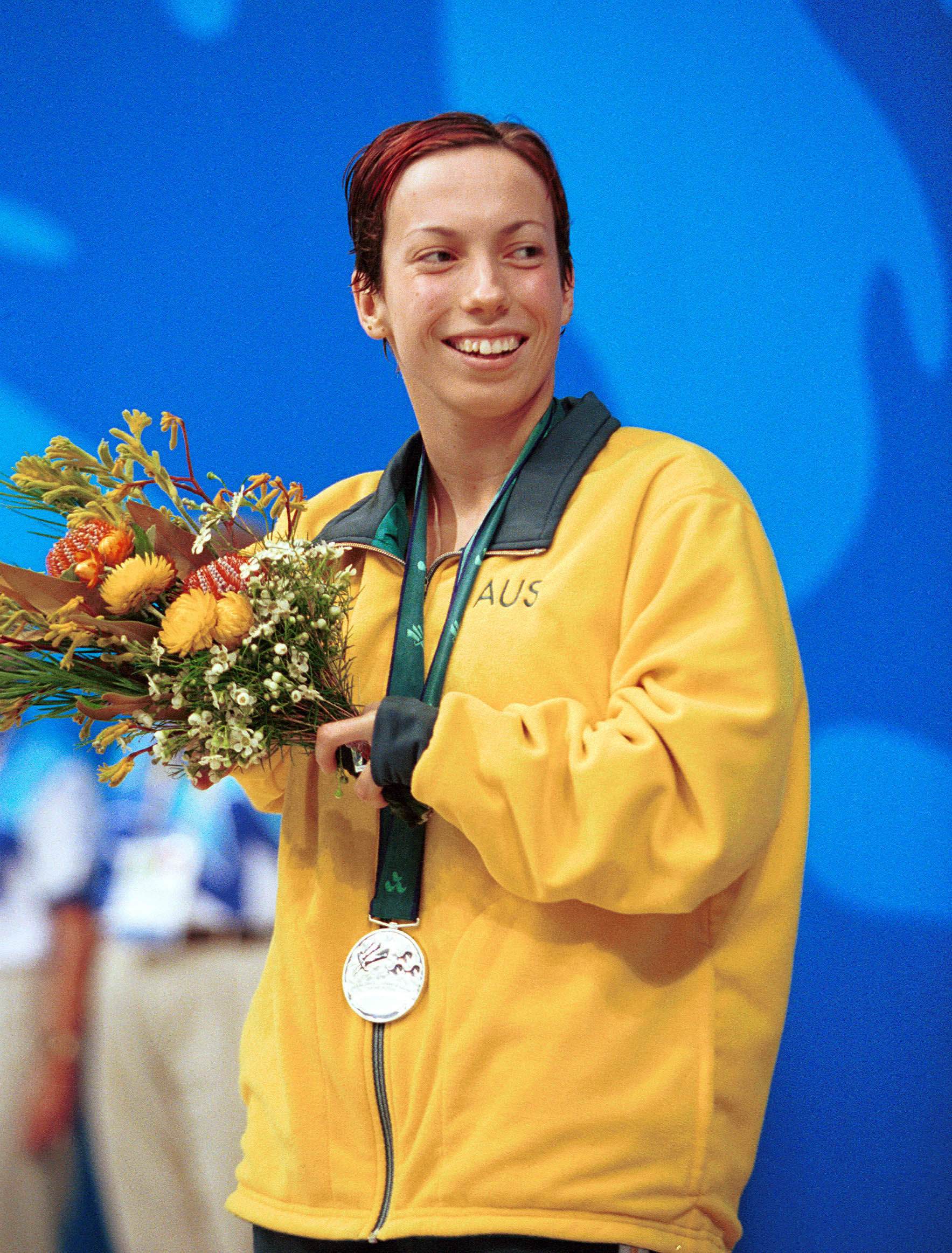
- Wright on the silver medal podium for the 400 m freestyle S6 at the 2000 Summer Paralympics

Personal information
- Nationality: Australia
- Born: 9 November 1979 (age 46)
Medal record
Swimming
Paralympic Games
Silver medal – second place	2000 Sydney	Women's 400 m Freestyle S6
Bronze medal – third place	1996 Atlanta	Women's 50 m Butterfly S6
Bronze medal – third place	2000 Sydney	Women's 4x50 m Freestyle relay 20 pts
IPC Swimming World Championships
Silver medal – second place	1998 Christchurch	Women's 4 x 50 m Freestyle Open
Bronze medal – third place	1998 Christchurch	Women's 50 m Butterfly S6
Bronze medal – third place	1998 Christchurch	Women's 4 x 50 m Medley Open

Elizabeth Wright (born 9 November 1979) is an Australian Paralympic swimmer who won one bronze at the 1996 Summer Paralympics and a bronze and silver at the 2000 Summer Paralympics. She also has a Master of Philosophy in fine arts (photography).

== Early life ==
Wright was born on 9 November 1979, and is from the New South Wales town of Cooranbong. She was born with a congenital limb deficiency. Her right arm is missing at the elbow, her right leg is "severely shortened" requiring the use of a prosthesis and she is lacking two fingers and the forearm bone of her left hand.

== Swimming career ==
Wright's swimming career at the highest level lasted for seven years. Her classification during this time was S6. She swam for the Gosford Amateur Swimming Club. and was a New South Wales Institute of Sport swimmer. She attended the opening of the Wesley Mission's Mangrove Mountain Retreat swimming pool. At the 1996 Atlanta Games she won a bronze medal in the Women's 50 m Butterfly S6 event. In January 2000, she attended the Australia Day Celebrations in Forest Park as a Paralympic Ambassador. She competed in the 2000 Sydney Games where she won a silver medal in the Women's 400 m Freestyle S6 event, and a bronze medal as part of the Australian women's team in the 4 x 50 m Freestyle Relay.

== Academic career ==
Wright first attended the University of Newcastle in 2003 at her mother's urging to explore her love of art in that setting. She enrolled in the university's Open Foundation program, which is intended for students over twenty years old who are entering university for the first time, before transitioning to Central Coast campus to complete a Bachelor of Fine Arts. She studied abroad at University of Leeds in her third year at the university. In 2008, she attended the University of Newcastle, where she completed a Master of Philosophy in Fine Art (Photography). She later attended the University of Leeds as a Doctorate of Philosophy student doing research in the fine arts. At the Canadian Association for Women's Public History Conference, "Women’s Bodies in a Public History Context" in Ottawa, Ontario, Canada, she presented a paper titled "self (un)contained: revealing the authentic experience of disability within a feminist context". She had a paper published in the University of Edinburgh’s Postgraduate Journal of Culture and the Arts titled "My Prosthetic and I: identity representation in bodily extension." Currently Wright is working with the overseas disability charity CBM as their Sports Ambassador. She is also the founder and editor of Conscious Being, a magazine "by disabled women, for disabled women".

== Journalist ==
Since 2022, she is a reporter with the Australian Broadcasting Corporation covering disability affairs and sport. At the 2024 Australian Sports Commission Media Awards, she was awarded the 'Best coverage of sport for people with disability'.
