= Alec Doomadgee =

Australian actor, television host

- Born: Gulf of Carpentaria, Australia
- Occupations: Actor, community leader

Alec Doomadgee is an Australian actor, television host and presenter. He is also an Indigenous Australian community leader, mentor and activist.

== Background ==
Born and raised on the born and raised with his extended family on the Waanyi / Garawa Land Trust, he is from the Doomadgee community in the Gulf of Carpentaria. He is also a descendant of Waanyi, Garawa and Gangalidda tribes. In 2004, Doomagee's brother died in police custody while being held in the Palm Island police watchhouse. Involved in native title issues, he is also chairman for the Waanyi PBC.

== Film and television ==
In 2008, he appeared in the short film, Joonba then later Benjamin Sniddlegrass and the Cauldron of Penguins. He also played the role of Wesley, Grace's husband in episode 1. of Redfern Now. He also made another appearance in the series in episode "Starting Over", this time as Koorioke Announcer. He also had recurring roles as Darana in the 2017 series, Cleverman.

Doomadgee was the driving force behind the 2016 documentary, Zach's Ceremony which took ten years to make. It covered his son's initiation into tribal lore. Doomadgee both directed and produced the film which was shown at New York's Margaret Mead Film Festival. He received a Best Documentary Award for the film at the 2016 Byron Bay Film Festival.

== Qantas boomerang incident ==
In 2015, he was stopped by security at Brisbane Airport when he tried to take his boomerangs onto a flight. The reason given, as he was told later, they were considered to be weapons. He told staff that they were not weapons, they were spiritual items. In spite of that he was still not allowed to take them on. He did later get an apology from a Qantas spokeswoman.

== Filmography ==
Film
Title	Role	Director	Year	Notes #
Joonba		Dean Gibson	2008	
Benjamin Sniddlegrass and the Cauldron of Penguins	Pentangle	Jeremy Dylan	2011	
Welcome to Country	Mayor Neville	Dean Gibson	2017	

Television roles (dramatic)
Title	Episode	Role	Director	Year	Notes #
The Strip	"Murdered, Chopped Up, and Frozen"	Gardener #2	Ken Cameron	2008	
Redfern Now	"Family"	Wesley	Catriona McKenzie	2012	
Redfern Now	"Starting Over"	Koorioke Announcer	Rachel Perkins	2013	
Ready for This	"Brand New Me"	Lily's Dad	Daina Reid	2015	
Cleverman	"Bindawu"	Darana	Wayne Blair	2017	
Cleverman	"Dark Clouds"	Darana	Wayne Blair	2017	
Cleverman	"Muya"	Darana	Leah Purcell	2017	
Cleverman	"Skin"	Darana	Leah Purcell	2017	

Documentary and non dramatic roles
Title	Role	Director	Year	Notes #
On the Edge	Self	Ben Rose	2010	
Blow Away The Smokes	Presenter	Fil Baker, Gillian Gould	2011	Documentary short
Blackfellas, Bulls & Bucking Broncos	Director, Producer	Alec Doomadgee, Martin Guinness	2012	
Zach's Ceremony	Himself, associate producer	Aaron Petersen	2016	

Host
Title	Role	Director	Year	Notes #
Volumz	Self, host		2011 - 2012	Production company NITV

== Links ==
- Imdb
