= The Bleeding Edge =

- Official poster
- Directed by: Kirby Dick
- Written by: Kirby Dick
- Produced by: Amy Ziering; Amy Herdy
- Cinematography: Thaddeus Wadleigh
- Edited by: Derek Boonstra; Andrew McAllister
- Music by: Jeff Beal
- Production companies: Chain Camera Pictures; Shark Island Productions
- Distributed by: Netflix
- Release dates: April 21, 2018 (Tribeca); July 27, 2018 (United States)
- Running time: 100 minutes
- Country: United States
- Language: English

The Bleeding Edge is a 2018 Netflix original documentary film that investigates the $400 billion medical device industry. Written and directed by Kirby Dick and produced by Amy Ziering and Amy Herdy, it premiered at the 2018 Tribeca Film Festival, where it was billed as "the stuff of dystopian nightmares". The film was released for streaming on Netflix on July 27, 2018.

== Synopsis ==
In The Bleeding Edge, Academy Award-nominated investigative filmmakers Kirby Dick and Amy Ziering turn their sights on the $400 billion medical device industry, examining lax regulations, corporate cover-ups, and profit-driven incentives that put patients at risk daily. Weaving emotionally powerful stories of people whose lives have been irrevocably harmed, it asks: What lifesaving technologies may actually be killing us? According to the director, "Very few people know about the medical device industry and the fact that it is even less regulated than pharmaceuticals". The film explores the process of regulating medical devices, primarily in the United States, and the impact of certain faulty devices on patients.

One of the primary focuses of the film is Bayer's permanent birth control device Essure, and the filmmakers highlight the device's failures that led to pain, discomfort, lost pregnancies, and death for multiple women. Other devices profiled include artificial hips that can lead to cobalt poisoning and vaginal mesh devices that injured multiple women. The film also explores the FDA's 510(k) process, which allows a medical device to be fast-tracked onto the market with less clinical study and without human testing.

== Reception ==
=== Critical reception ===
Upon its July 27, 2018, release, the film was chosen as the "New York Times Pick of the Week", and Rotten Tomatoes indicated that 100% of critics gave the film positive reviews. Frank Scheck of The Hollywood Reporter called the film "a terrifying eye-opener", and noted that it "concludes by informing us that no one from the FDA or any of the companies involved agreed to be interviewed." Owen Gleiberman of Variety stated that "Kirby Dick's disturbingly powerful exposé nails a corporatized America." IndieWire predicted the film "stands a good chance at enlightening more people who have been (or might be) hoodwinked."

A review on Flavorwire said the film "alternates history with the stories of those who are suffering under the side effects of a handful of poorly tested devices, and their descriptions of their conditions are visceral, scary, and horrifying, accumulating in a film that's hard to watch and harder to ignore." April Wolfe of The Village Voice analyzed how Ziering and Dick continued their "legacy of equally infuriating and enlightening documentaries" with the film, while the Los Angeles Times declared that "The Bleeding Edge can already be called an agent for change."

=== Impact ===
A week before its release, The Bleeding Edge became part of a national news story when Bayer removed the birth control device Essure, one of the devices most heavily criticized in the film, from the U.S. market. Entertainment Weekly promptly added the film to their list of "documentaries that have changed the world".

The film quickly generated discussion in the medical industry. The website Medical Device and Diagnostic Industry noted that The Bleeding Edge "has rattled the medical device industry and left countless viewers speechless", while The BMJ's Sexual and Reproductive Health Journal tweeted that the film was "an excellent, disturbing documentary about the need for better trials and evidence around medical devices, especially when it comes to women's health." Stat News quoted a neurosurgeon who stated that the film made him "wonder what the misuse of medical technology means for patients and for doctors" and led him to "believe we need a change of culture to avoid overuse of procedures or misuse of drugs and devices." The podcast Mike on Medtech called the film a "mandatory watch for everybody working in the medical device industry", and Healthcare Analytics News noted that it "inspired anger among those inside and outside healthcare, prompting calls for change."

== Awards and nominations ==
Year	Organization	Award	Category	Result
2018	George Polk Awards	George Polk Award	Medical Reporting	Won
2019	Peabody Awards	Peabody Award	Documentary Film	Nominated
2019	Grierson Awards	Grierson Award	Best Science Documentary	Nominated
