= Jacquelin Magnay =

Australian journalist

- Education: Trained as a teacher
- Occupation: Journalist
- Employer(s): Sydney Morning Herald, Telegraph Media Group, The Australian
- Notable work: Coverage of the 2000 Sydney Olympics, Articles on Australian Institute of Sport cyclists drugs scandal, Shane Warne drug scandal, Firepower Pill investigation
- Television: Offsiders, The Footy Show
- Awards: Walkley Award (2004)

Jacquelin Magnay is an Australian journalist who wrote for the Sydney Morning Herald from 1992 to 2009. In November 2009 she was appointed as Olympics editor for the Telegraph Media Group in the United Kingdom. As at 2022, Magnay was European correspondent for The Australian.

== Career ==
Trained as a teacher, Jacquelin Magnay started in journalism at the St George & Sutherland Shire Leader and within six months was the sports editor. Magnay started at the Sydney Morning Herald in 1992 and has worked in the paper's Canberra bureau. She was the Herald's Olympics writer in the lead up to the Sydney Olympics and continued to cover the Olympics for the paper.

Magnay made headlines in 1993 by demanding access for female reporters to after-game locker rooms for interviews. She was prompted to take action when radio commentator and Balmain Tigers coach Alan Jones told her to stop behaving like a temperamental schoolgirl. Magnay was successful in her complaint to the Human Rights and Equal Opportunities Commission about dressing room access, forcing the Balmain rugby league club to issue a public apology in late 1995. This action set a universal standard of gender equality involving sports journalism across Australian sports. But Magnay's actions have attracted harsh comments from male Australian counterparts, such as being told to "get home and wash the dishes" by former AFL footballer-turned-Triple M radio commentator Danny Frawley.

Magnay won a Walkley Award in 2004 for a series of articles on a drugs scandal involving Australian Institute of Sport cyclists. She was highly commended by the Walkley judges in 2003, along with her colleague Roy Masters for the coverage of the Shane Warne drug scandal. She was a finalist in the Walkley awards, with co-author Gerard Ryle in 2007 and in 2008 for investigation of the Firepower Pill.

She was a regular contributor to the Sunday morning Australian Broadcasting Corporation sports program Offsiders, hosted by Barrie Cassidy. She was also a regular panellist on The Footy Show and contributed a weekly radio segment on ABC Radio Canberra.

In November 2009 Magnay was appointed to the new post of Olympics editor for the Telegraph Media Group in the United Kingdom, covering the 2010 Winter Olympics in Vancouver and the 2012 Summer Olympics in London for the Daily Telegraph and the Sunday Telegraph. As at 2022, Magnay was European correspondent for The Australian.
