= Inside Sport =

Australian magazine

- Cover of April 2015 issue featuring Shaun Burgoyne
- Categories: Sports magazine
- Frequency: Monthly
- Publisher: Nextmedia
- Founded: 1991
- Final issue: June 2020
- Country: Australia
- Language: English
- Website: www.insidesport.com.au

Inside Sport was an Australian sport magazine published by nextmedia. It began publication in 1991 and produced its last issue in June 2020. Its website still exists, essentially as a portal to articles on other Nextmedia-owned sports brands.

During its print tenure, Inside Sport largely comprised articles by freelance journalists, covering a wide array of sports. It focused on sporting content, sports photography, and the attention given to models and their photo shoots. In 2000, the publication won the award for Magazine of the Year in Australia. In 2003, an article published in Inside Sport by Anthony Sharwood entitled "Brothers In Arms" won a Walkley Award for best sports coverage across all media.

== Cover models ==
Australian television personality and model Nikki Visser appeared on the cover of Inside Sport four times: July 1996, July 1998, April 1999 and March 2002. The magazine also organised an annual national model contest—The Inside Sport Model Search—which ran from 1996 until 2008. Notable contestants included Visser, Nicky Whelan, Imogen Bailey and Jennifer Hawkins.

In May 2007, the magazine's editors made the decision to cease using scantily-clad 'sports models' to illustrate the cover and centre-pages of each issue (many of the women featured were professional models or entertainment celebrities rather than actual athletes). Instead, a notable sportsperson, male or female, would adorn the cover each month.

This decision was made to improve sales, which in mid-2007 had fallen to 23,000 per month (down from a monthly peak circulation of 80,000 in the late 1990s). The new policy was also intended to change the 'blokey' image of the magazine and to establish it as a serious sports publication rather than just another lad mag. However, in 2008, the November issue of Inside Sport attracted some criticism for featuring a photo of Australian swimming champion Stephanie Rice on its cover which was allegedly heavily airbrushed.

== Sales ==
In May 2012, it was reported that sales for Inside Sport had increased by 7%, defying a current trend of declining sales for male-orientated sports & lifestyle magazines. By November 2012, sales had increased by over 27%. In March 2014, it was reported that the magazine's readership had declined by over 21% in the previous 12 months.

Roy Morgan Research indicated the magazine's readership increased by over 21% between March 2016 and March 2017. This was in contrast to the previous year (March 2015 to March 2016) when readership declined by 25%.

== Closure ==
In January 2021, online sports site Northern Beaches Sports Tribune posted an article claiming that Inside Sport had shut down. There have been no print or digital issues of Inside Sport released since June 2020. There has been no official announcement and the magazine's website continues to operate, although the majority of the site's content comprises links to articles in Nextmedia's other sports-related publications such as Golf Australia & AMB and links to other sports-related websites.
