= The Final Quarter =

- Directed by: Ian Darling
- Produced by: Mary Macrae and Ian Darling
- Edited by: Sally Fryer
- Music by: Paul Charlier
- Distributed by: Roadshow Entertainment
- Release date: 7 June 2019 (Sydney Film Festival)
- Running time: 75 minutes
- Country: Australia

The Final Quarter is a 2019 Australian documentary, directed by Ian Darling and produced by Shark Island Productions, about the final stages of the Australian football career of Adam Goodes, during which he was the target of repeated booing by opposition fans.

== Background ==
Goodes, an Aboriginal Australian, was drafted by the Sydney Swans in the 1997 AFL draft and went on to have a successful career with the Swans, featuring in their 2005 and 2012 premiership teams and being awarded a number of accolades for his performances including the AFL Rising Star award in 1999, the Brownlow Medal (2003 and 2006), the Bob Skilton Medal (2003, 2006 and 2011), and All Australian selection (2003, 2006, 2009 and 2011). In 2014 he was named Australian of the Year in recognition of his community work supporting Indigenous Australian youth, the efforts of the Go Foundation (co-founded with his Sydney Swans teammate Michael O'Loughlin), and his efforts to combat racism.

On 24 May 2013, during the AFL's annual Indigenous Round (the Sir Doug Nicholls Round), a 13-year-old Collingwood supporter called Goodes an "ape". Upon hearing the abuse, Goodes pointed the girl out to security, who ejected her from the stadium. Goodes was deeply affected by the incident, but said repeatedly that the girl should not be blamed; the environment that she grew up in had shaped her response. The girl phoned to apologise, saying that she hadn't realised the impact of her words.

Over the following years, and particularly in 2015, Goodes was repeatedly and loudly booed by opposition fans at most matches. The motivation for, and acceptability of, the booing generated wide public debate, which dominated media coverage from both sports and political commentators for weeks at a time.

During a match against Carlton in May 2015, again during the Indigenous Round, Goodes celebrated a goal by performing an Aboriginal war dance, in which he mimed throwing a spear in the direction of the Carlton cheer squad. Goodes said after the incident that the dance was based on one he learned from under-16s Indigenous team the Flying Boomerangs, and that it was intended as an expression of Indigenous pride during Indigenous Round, not as a means of offending or intimidating the crowd. The booing of Goodes intensified in the months after the war dance. Goodes took indefinite leave from the game in August of the 2015 season. Many clubs and players in the AFL supported Goodes in the week of his leave. He returned the following week and played for the remainder of the season after an outpouring of support from fans, actors, politicians, celebrities and teammates, including two spontaneous standing ovations.

Goodes retired from the AFL in September 2015. He did not attend the Grand Final, where retiring players traditionally take part in a parade, one of only a handful of players to decline this invitation since the parade for retiring players was established.

== Documentary ==
The documentary uses only archival footage and newspaper headlines from the last few years of Goodes' career, with no new interviews or footage. It includes footage of the incidents, as well as interviews and comments from media personalities, politicians, players, officials, and members of the public. Goodes himself was not interviewed for the documentary, although he was consulted and gave permission for it to go ahead.

Many commentators and Goodes himself believed that the booing was racially motivated, while others believed that it was motivated by dislike of his playing style or of his response to a 13 year old girl who shouted a racially charged insult at him. The director's statement about the film states that he did not want to explicitly choose a side but instead wanted to present the footage and allow "the audience to see and hear for themselves what had happened, to ask their own questions and to come to their own conclusions".

== Release ==
The Final Quarter was shown to the 2019 playing group of Indigenous players in a preview screening in February 2019. It had its World Premiere at the 2019 Sydney Film Festival. It was shown as part of the 2019 Perth International Film Festival and the Castlemaine Documentary Film Festival, both in July 2019, and aired on Network Ten on 18 July 2019.

Darling also announced that the film will be made freely available to schools and clubs across Australia.

== Reception ==
The documentary was widely praised by critics. Luke Buckmaster, writing for The Guardian, called it "confronting" and "inspiring", while Blake Howard, writing for Flicks, gave it five stars and called it exhilarating and powerful. Garry Maddox, for the Sydney Morning Herald says "It is a powerful work that stirs deep emotions", while Screenhub's Sarah Ward calls it 'crucial'.

The Go Foundation reported that it had received several messages from members of the public who had seen the documentary and wanted to express their remorse for having booed Goodes.

Paul Kelly wrote the end credit song "Every Day My Mother's Voice" for the film, and won Best Original Song Composed for the Screen, 2019 Screen Music Awards.

== Awards ==
- 2019 Best Reporting of an Issue in Sport (Winner) Sport Australia Media Awards
- 2019 Best Documentary Feature, Asian Academy Creative Awards: Grand Final winner (World) and Regional Winner (Australia and New Zealand)
- 2019 Best Documentary Feature Nominee, AACTA Awards
- 2019 Best Documentary Feature, (winner) Film Critics Circle of Australia Awards
- 2019 Racism. It Stops With Me Australian Human Rights Commission Award
- 2019 Best Documentary Feature Nominee, Screen Producers Australia Awards
- 2019 Finalist Walkley Awards
- 2019 Best Editing in a Documentary - Sally Fryer (Winner) AACTA Awards
- 2019 Best Editing in a Documentary Feature - Sally Fryer (Winner) Australian Screen Editors Ellie Awards
- 2019 Audience Award (Runner Up) Sydney Film Festival
- 2019 Best Sound in a Documentary (Nominee) Australian Screen Sound Guild

== Responses ==
=== Apology ===
On 7 June 2019, on the day of the documentary's premiere, the AFL and all of its 18 clubs issued an unreserved apology for the sustained racism and events which drove Goodes out of the game. They said:

Adam, who represents so much that is good and unique about our game, was subject to treatment that drove him from football. The game did not do enough to stand with him, and call it out. Failure to call out racism and not standing up for one of our own let down all Aboriginal and Torres Strait Islander players, past and present. Our game is about belonging. We want all Australians to feel they belong and that they have a stake in the game. We will not achieve this while racism and discrimination exists in our game... We will stand strongly with all in the football community who experience racism or discrimination. We are unified on this, and never want to see the mistakes of the past repeated.

The statement also said that the football community "pledged to continue to fight all forms of racism and discrimination, on and off the field".

=== Responses by AFL clubs and players ===
The Western Bulldogs released their own statement about the documentary. The Hawthorn players all wore number 37, Goodes' jersey number, during their warm ups before their match against Sydney on 21 June 2019 in a gesture of support.

== See also ==
- The Australian Dream (2019 film), documentary film about Goodes' treatment, and racism in Australia, written by Stan Grant (journalist)
- Nicky Winmar, another Australian Rules footballer who was the target of racially motivated abuse
- Racism in sport in Australia
