= London Australian Film Festival =

Film festivals

The original London Australian Film Festival (LAFF) was an annual film festival held at the Barbican Theatre in London, England between 1994 and 2011. It was supported by agencies of the Australian Government.

In 2017, the volunteer-run London Australian Film Society founded a new festival, initially named Oz Film Festival, but later renamed London Australian Film Festival (also referred to as LAF Film Festival). Held at three cinemas across London, the 5th edition took place in September 2023.

== History ==
=== LAFF at the Barbican ===
London Australian Film Festival, supported by the Australian Film Commission (AFC), was held at the Barbican Theatre. The inaugural film festival in March 1994 screened 12 feature films and eight short films. It continued to screen most major Australian feature films and documentaries made each year, along with selected shorts and films from the archive. It was founded by The Barbican's director of cinema and festival director, Englishman Robert Rider, with support from the AFC (which later closed its London office), after he had previously organised two successful short seasons of Australian films.

In 2003, the ninth edition of the festival, half of the screenings were sold out before opening night, and the week-long program was extended to 11 days. In that year, Indigenous Australian films had a significant presence, including Rabbit-Proof Fence and The Tracker.

In 2005, National Australia Bank was its chief commercial sponsor, which gave it naming rights to this 11th edition, while it continued to be supported by the AFC, in partnership with the Australia International Cultural Council (AICC), an initiative of the Department of Foreign Affairs and Trade, and the Australian High Commission in London. The festival included a program of shorts (one before each feature), presented for the second year in association with Flickerfest, as well as the London edition of Tropfest. In addition, for the first time, several feature films and documentaries selected from the festival toured the UK between April and June 2005, including Manchester, Cardiff, and Edinburgh.

By the 15th edition in 2009, after Screen Australia had been created to absorb some of the functions of the AFC, the new funding regime was a generous one, especially to established Australian filmmakers. Films screened that year included Baz Luhrmann's Australia and Gillian Armstrong's Death Defying Acts.

In its 16th edition in 2010, the festival included two genre sections, featuring horror and comedy films. Warwick Thornton's debut feature Samson and Delilah played on the opening night, and other films included Robert Connolly's documentary feature Balibo and Rachel Perkins' musical Bran Nue Dae.

The 17th edition in 2011 appears to be the final edition.

== Current festival ==
In 2017, the volunteer-run London Australian Film Society founded a new festival, initially named Oz Film Festival but later renamed London Australian Film Festival (also referred to as LAF Film Festival). Although the name is identical, it has nothing to do with the LAFF at the Barbican. This festival is still active, with the 5th edition taking place 21-24 September 2023. The four-day festival featured six Australian premieres, with films being shown at Picturehouse Central, Finsbury Park Picturehouse, and The Garden Cinema.
