= Jon Muir =

Jon Robert Muir OAM (born 1961) is an Australian mountaineer who has walked through many terrains, supporting himself through his travels, becoming very skilled at bushwalking, hunting and finding resources. He is well known for walking alone across Australia, the North pole, South pole, Mt. Everest and kayaking in the ocean. He has many different achievements that are listed below, in chronological order.

== Biography ==
Muir grew up in Australia. He began adventuring after being inspired while sailing with a friend. He started rock climbing professionally. At age sixteen, Muir decided to drop out of school and pursue adventuring and climbing full time, beginning in New Zealand. He climbed Mount Everest solo and walked across Australia without assistance or re-supply.

Muir lives on an off-grid property, adjacent to the Grampian ranges in Victoria, Australia.

== Achievements ==
=== Year ===	== Achievements ==
1982	Summited Mont Blanc (4807m) via the Freney Pillar
1982	Summited Grandes Jorasses (4208m) via the Walker Spur.
1982	Summited Changabang (6864m) via the south-west pillar.
1983	Summited the Matterhorn (4478m) solo via North Face
1983	Summited Piz Badile (3370m) solo via the North Face, setting a speed record in the process.
1985	Completed a winter traverse of Mont Maudit, Mont Blanc du Tacul and Mont Blanc.
1985	Summited the Kedarnath Dome (6850m) in a day.
1986	Summited Shivling via the south-west pillar.
1986	Again summited Mont Blanc solo, this time setting a speed record via the Frontier ridge.
1987	Summited the Kedarnath Group of mountains, with a solo ten-kilometre traverse of the peaks in 41 hours.
1988	Summited Mount Everest from the south as a member of the Australian Bicentennial Expedition. Jon reached the summit alone, and set a record when climbing the south side without sherpas.
1989	Summited Aconcagua (6960m) in a day.
1989	Recipient of the Order of Australia for services to mountaineering.
1995	Completed a 900 km sea kayaking trip down the Daintree River to Cape York in 62 days.
1996	Completed a solo waterless 620 km desert trek through Lake Eyre and the Tirari Desert in 34 days, pulling a 260 kg cart.
1999	Reached the South Pole as part of an expedition with Eric Philips and Peter Hillary. Arrived via the Shackleton Glacier, covering a distance of 1500 km over a period of 84 days.
1999	First solo traverse on foot of Australia's largest salt lakes – Lake Eyre, Lake Frome and Lake Gairdner.
2000	Completed an 800 km solo sea-kayaking trip along east coast of the Cape York Peninsula in 52 days.
2001	First ever unassisted crossing of Australia from Port Augusta to Burketown, covering 2500 km over 128 days.
2001	Australian Geographic Society's Adventurer of the Year.
2002	Reached the North Pole from Siberia, with Eric Philips.
2003	Recipient of the Centenary Medal for contributions made to Australian society.
2007	Completed a solo walk to geographic centre of Australia, covering a distance of 1800 km in 70 days.
2011	Made first human-powered traverse of flooded Lake Eyre, with Suzan Muir in a double kayak, a distance of 120 km in 24 hours, from mouth of the Warburton River down the Warburton Groove to Dulhunty Island then to shore at Belt Bay.

== See also ==
- Alone Across Australia
- List of people who have walked across Australia
- Australian Geographic Society Adventure Awards
