= ATOM Award =

ATOM Awards
- Awarded for: Achievements in film, television, multimedia, and multi-modal productions
- Country: Australia and New Zealand
- Presented by: Australian Teachers of Media (ATOM)
- First award: 1982
- Website: ATOM Awards Official Website

The ATOM Awards are a group of awards offered to Australian and New Zealand "professionals, educators and students", honoring achievements in the making of film, television, multimedia, and from 2007 multi-modal productions.

The Awards were established in the year 1982 by the Australian Teachers of Media, "an independent, non-profit association to promote media education and screen literacy in primary, secondary and tertiary education and the broader community".

Awards are now offered in 36 different categories as of 2005, broken down into awards for students, tertiary students, educational resources, and general. There is also a teacher's award. This Award is made at the discretion of the judges, and recognizes the commitment, dedication and inspiration of a teacher or school, and which the judges can observe informing a body of student work as submitted in either the primary, secondary or tertiary categories of the ATOM Awards. The Teachers’ Award can neither be sought nor applied for, and is given solely at the judges’ discretion.

The awards attract student filmmakers, educational films, and even professional industry practitioners. This makes it one of the only awards of its kind.

Entries are open to Australian and New Zealand students and media industry professionals.

== 2007 ATOM Awards categories ==
Schools

- Best Junior (K-8) Film Video Production. (includes music clips, short drama, documentaries, experimental)
- Best Junior (K-8) Multimedia Production
- Best Senior (9-12) Multimedia Production. (Multimedia production: combination of image, text, audio, video & interactivity)
- Best Secondary Animation (claymation, drawing, cell 2D & 3D)
- Best Secondary Documentary
  - Images of Age Sub-category (open to Vic residents only)*
- Best Secondary Fiction
- Best Secondary Music Video

Tertiary, A production made by a student or individual enrolled at a tertiary or TAFE institution at the time of the production

- Best Short Fiction
- Best Experimental
- Best Documentary
  - Images of Age Sub-category (open to Vic residents only)*
- Best Animation
- Best Music Video
- Best Multimedia (includes web)
- Best Interactive Game

General

- Best Short Fiction (50 minutes or less)
- Best Experimental
- Best Animation
- Best Music Video
- Best Children's Television Series
- Best Multi-modal production†
- Best Documentary Short Form (30 minutes or less)
- Best Documentary General
  - Images of Age Sub-category (open to Vic residents only)*
- Best Documentary Social & Political Issues
- Best Documentary Science, Technology & The Environment
- Best Documentary Human Story
- Best Multimedia (inc. installations and web)
- Best Interactive Game

Educational/Vocational

These category entries will be judged cross platform. Judges will be assessing best teaching/training practice, methodology, suitability to the audience, delivery and content. These entries may be websites, TV programs, videos, film, DVD, CD-ROMs or a convergence of the above, including installations.

- Best Primary Education Resource
- Best Secondary Education Resource
- Best Tertiary Education Resource
- Best Instructional/training Resource
- Best Multimedia Learning Reference (includes web)
- Best Multi-modal production†
- Best Indigenous Resource

== Notable past ATOM Award nominees and winners ==
- Ibrahim
  - (Ivan Gaal, Rob McCubbin production; Ivan Gaal direction, Tony Lintermans writing)
  - ATOM Best Social Issues Award 1986
  - ATOM Children's Award, Australian Section 1986
- Hunt Angels
  - Hunt Angels Productions
  - ATOM Award winner 2006
- The Mysterious Geographic Explorations of Jasper Morello
  - 2005 Academy Award nominee
  - (Anthony Lucas, 3D Films)
  - ATOM Award winner 2005
- Noah & Saskia
  - (ACTF)
  - ATOM Award winner 2005
- Adam Elliot
  - 2003 Academy Award winner
  - ATOM Award winner 1998
- Wildness
  - (Big and Little Films in association with Film Australia)
  - ATOM Award winner 2004
- The 20 Cent Quest
  - (Matthew Heilbronn and Nicholas Bouvier, Lara Primary School)
  - ATOM Award winner 2003, K-8 (both categories)
- A Wedding in Ramallah
  - (Sherine Salama, Habibi Films)
  - ATOM Award winner 2003
- Gulpilil – One Red Blood
  - (Darlene Johnson, JOTZ Productions)
- Martha's New Coat
  - (Rachel Ward, New Town Films)
  - ATOM Award winner 2003
- Harry’s War
  - (Richard Frankland, Golden Seahorse Productions)
- Tulip
  - (Rachel Griffiths)
  - ATOM Award Nominee 1999
- Wicked Science
  - (Jonathan M Shiff Productions)
  - ATOM Award winner 2004
- Round the Twist
  - (ACTF)
- FrontLine
  - (Working Dog Productions)
  - ATOM Award Winner 1998

== See also ==
- List of television awards
