= Zach's Ceremony =

1999 film

- Directed by: Aaron Petersen
- Written by: Sarah Linton
- Produced by: Sarah Linton
- Starring: Zac Doomadgee, Alec Doomadgee
- Release dates: 2 May 2016 (Hot Docs Canadian International Documentary Festival); 30 March 2017 (Australian cinema release)
- Country: Australia
- Language: English

Zach's Ceremony is an Australian coming of age documentary film. It looks at the transition to adulthood from an Indigenous cultural perspective. It features Zach Doomadgee and his father Alec Doomadgee.

== Synopsis ==
The film looks at what it means to be an Indigenous Australian and Zach Doomadgee's cultural journey. Zach who is of Indigenous and Caucasian descent is influenced by two cultures. It also looks at how Zach is affected by being one of the few Aboriginal children at his Sydney school, being too dark. It also looks at his being too light-skinned when he visits his father's community in far-north Queensland.

== Production and cast ==
The film was written and produced by Sarah Linton and directed by Aaron Petersen.

Alec Doomadgee played a major part in the film in both direction and production.

The film was begun in 2009 when Zach was aged around 10.

== Release ==
Zach's Ceremony premiered at the Hot Docs Canadian International Documentary Festival in May 2016. The film was also shown at the Margaret Mead Film Festival in New York City.

It was announced by FilmInk that the documentary would open across Australia from Thursday 30 March 2017, and screen at Cinema Nova in Carlton, Victoria.

== Awards ==
At the Byron Bay Film Festival, Zach's Ceremony, along with Brendan Shoebridge's film, The Bentley Effect, took the top awards. Alec Doomadgee was also winner of the Festival's Best Documentary Award.

It also won Best Documentary awards at both the Melbourne International Film Festival and the Sydney Film Festival
