= Australian Screen Sound Guild =

Audio production and post-production industry association formed in 1988

- Logo of the Australian Screen Sound Guild
- Abbreviation: ASSG
- Formation: 1988; 38 years ago
- Type: Guild
- Headquarters: Sydney, New South Wales, Australia
- President: Nigel Christensen
- Website: www.assg.org.au

The Australian Screen Sound Guild is a professional association for people working in audio engineering and post-production in film, television, multimedia, and related industries across Australia. It recognises excellence in the industries by a set of annual awards known as the Australian Screen Sound Awards.

== History ==
The Australian Screen Sound Guild was formed in 1988.

== Description ==
The organisation represents people working in audio engineering and post-production in film, television, multimedia, and other related audio industries. It includes those involved with location sound, sound editing, audio engineers, sound mixers and engineers, television audio production, and multimedia.

The guild is headquartered in Sydney, New South Wales, and is directed by a committee which includes representatives from each Australian state, except New South Wales.

== Governance ==
The ASSG is governed by an elected committee. As of August 2024 the president of ASSG is Nigel Christensen.

== Awards ==
The guild recognises people working in the Australian screen sound industry by the Australian Screen Sound Awards. Members of the guild nominate work they completed in the previous year, the nominations are judged by the members en masse.

The guild offers awards for best sound, best sound design, best sound mixing and a members' choice award.

The 28th edition of the awards were held in Adelaide in November 2024, and included a Student Encouragement Award and a Lifetime Achievement Award.
