= Rhoda Roberts =

Australian arts executive (1959–2026)

Rhoda Roberts AO
- Born: 8 July 1959; Canterbury, New South Wales, Australia
- Died: 21 March 2026 (aged 66)
- Occupations: Actress; director; arts executive
- Years active: 1986–2025
- Spouse: Bill Hunter (m. 1993; died 2011) (Note: Had been separated since 1999.)
- Partner: Steven Field
- Children: 3

Rhoda Ann Roberts (8 July 1959 – 21 March 2026) was an Australian theatre and arts director, arts executive, television presenter, and actress. She was head of Indigenous programming at the Sydney Opera House from 2012 until 2021. She was also a highly respected Aboriginal elder, being afforded the title "Aunty" (Aunty Rhoda). She introduced the term "Welcome to Country" in the 1980s, giving contemporary expression to an ancient custom, and originated the idea of performing the ceremony before significant cultural events, which gained widespread acceptance in Australia.

Roberts' parents, a mixed-race couple, were politically active, and Roberts was taught Aboriginal culture by her Bundjalung / Widjabul father. Roberts first studied nursing in her home town in Lismore, New South Wales, qualifying as a nurse at Canterbury Hospital in Sydney in 1979, undertaking further studies in England, and working as a nurse in India and other countries. On her return to Sydney, she studied performing arts.

Roberts was a co-founder of the Aboriginal National Theatre Trust in 1987. She became the first Indigenous Australian presenter on television in 1989, appearing on the SBS Television show First In Line; she later wrote for, produced, and presented work on television. She was a producer at the Indigenous media agency Vibe Australia from 1992 until 2014. During this time, was a co-founder of the Deadly Awards; founded the Festival of the Dreaming in 1997; and was cultural advisor for the 2000 Summer Olympics in Sydney. From 2008 until 2011, she was creative director for the Sydney New Year's Eve celebrations. She also acted in, wrote, and directed numerous stage productions, including a starring role in Belvoir's 1993 production of Louis Nowra's play Radiance. Her final performance, in December 2025, was in her own play, My Cousin Frank, about her cousin, boxer Frank Roberts, who was the first Aboriginal Australian to participate in the Olympics Games.

In October 2026, Creative Australia established the Rhoda Roberts Trailblazer Award in her honour.

== Early life and education ==
Rhoda Ann Roberts was born in Canterbury Hospital in Sydney on 8 July 1959. She was a Bundjalung woman of the Widjabul/Wiyebal clan on her father's side, and her totem was the lizard. She had a twin sister, Lois Roberts, and two brothers (Phillip and Mark); her parents also raised several cousins with them.

Her paternal grandfather, Frank Roberts, a pastor with the Church of Christ, was active in the Aborigines Progressive Association (APA), and ran an Aboriginal settlement called Cubawee at Tuncester, near Lismore, which was bulldozed in 1964. He was educated at the segregated school on the Aboriginal reserve on Cabbage Tree Island. (Note: The Sydney Morning Herald article by Candice Baker in 2019 confuses father with grandfather in the link to the ADB in the first paragraph. Both were called Frank.)

Her parents were politically active: her father, Frank Roberts Jnr, also grew up on the reserve on Cabbage Tree Island under the Aboriginal Protection Board. He later attended Oral Roberts University, an evangelical university in Tulsa, Oklahoma, US, where he prayed with Martin Luther King Jr. and experienced the birth of the American civil rights movement, before attending the Woolwich Bible College in Sydney. He was a pastor with the Church of Christ, and the first Indigenous person appointed to the Australian Board of Missions, and was a board member of the Federal Council for the Advancement of Aborigines and Torres Strait Islanders, who campaigned for the yes vote in the 1967 referendum. He was also active in the APA, and joined the Aboriginal Tent Embassy in Canberra in 1972, where he talked to Gough Whitlam about Indigenous land rights. Roberts's mother, Muriel, was white, well-educated, and worked at David Jones, and was also a dressmaker. They met at church, when Muriel was 26 and Frank 42. Both parents were also interested in the arts.

The family moved to Lismore when the twins were 18 months old, where, unlike Sydney, the local citizens were shocked at the mixed-race children. She attended Lismore Heights Primary and Richmond River High in Lismore. As a teenager she and her family spent some years in Sydney, where she attended Canterbury Girls' School, but they returned to Lismore because her father was homesick. She completed Year 10 in Lismore, becoming one of the first Aboriginal students to do this. The only reason she did not go on to do year 12 was that it was discouraged for Aboriginal students at her school; she later wrote that a careers advisor told her that "as a mission kid, she'd only end up unemployed". At the time, Aboriginal people experienced much discrimination in Lismore, including being refused entry to cafes, and she was often called a "darkie" at school. Her father had taught her and her siblings to ignore racism directed at them, and not to become victims.

Roberts initially wanted to study journalism, but was discouraged by her mother, who feared that nobody would employ her because of her race. She first trained as a nurse's aide, and was refused access to nurse training by the matron at the Lismore Base Hospital. She then moved back to Sydney, where she qualified as a nurse at Canterbury Hospital in 1979.

After a stint on Hayman Island, Queensland, Roberts went to London, England, in 1981 to train in accident and emergency nursing at Westminster Hospital, gaining a certificate. She then travelled to several other countries, including India, volunteering as well as doing paid work as a nurse. On her return to Sydney, she studied for a diploma in performing arts for three years at Brian Syron's acting studio, alongside fellow students Ernie Dingo and Lydia Miller. During this time, Roberts worked at Manly Hospital to support herself.

== Career ==
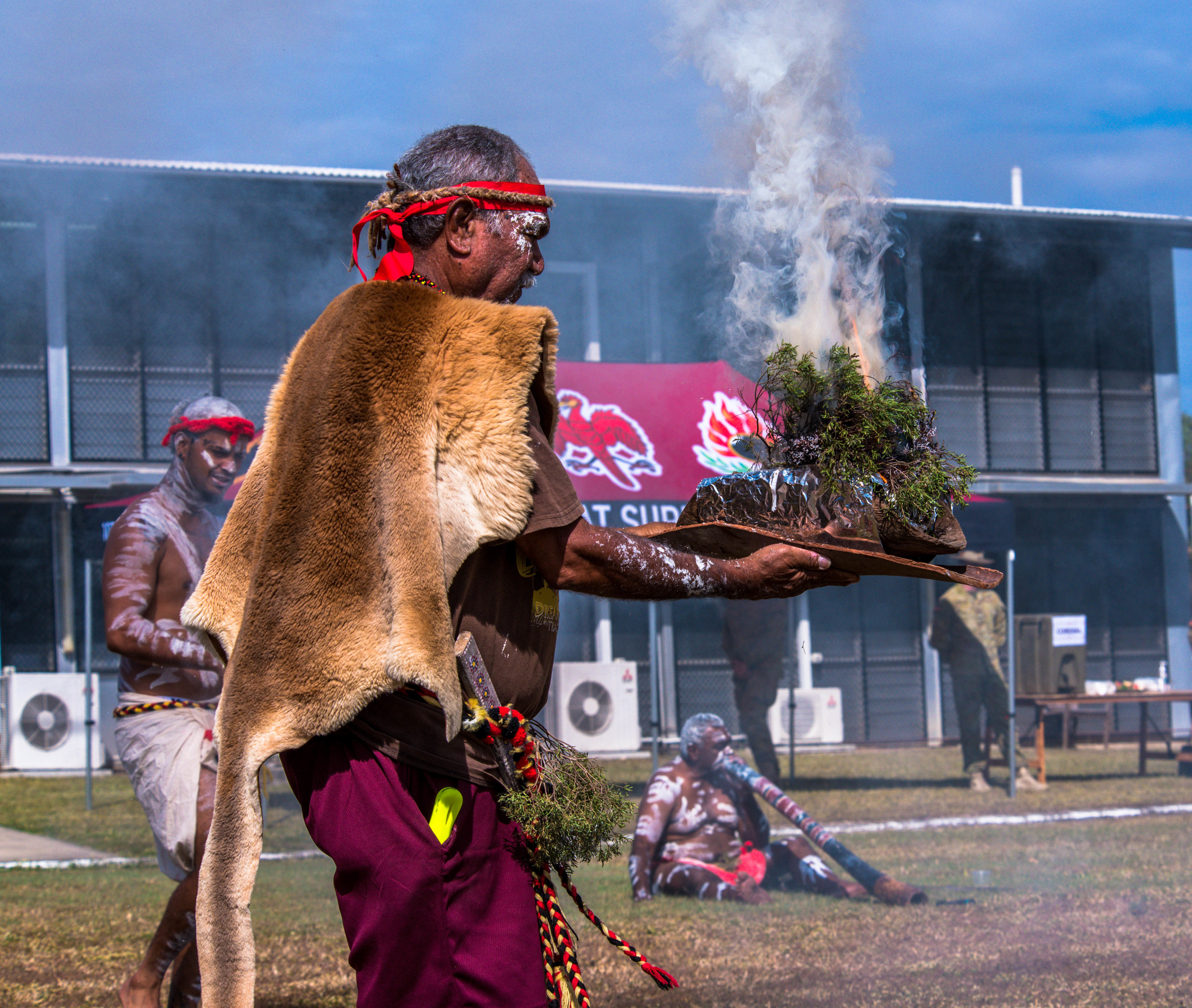
Bindal Elder Uncle Alfred Smallwood performs the smoking ceremony at a Welcome to Country at Lavarack Barracks, Townsville, Queensland, 2021

Roberts was a co-founder of the Aboriginal National Theatre Trust (ANTT) with Brian Syron, Lydia Miller, and others, with Justine Saunders as adviser. The ANTT arose out of the First National Black Playwrights Conference and Workshop in Canberra, in 1987, becoming formally incorporated in 1988. Second (1989) and Third National Black Playwrights Conferences followed. In 2016, Roberts said that the living person she most admired was Lydia Miller, as a "true Cultural Custodian who pass[es] on knowledge to ensure there is wealth and richness of understanding the environment and country and they do it with such humility and spirit of generosity always astounds me". Miller had also been a nurse, and they became friends and continued to work together. Roberts was the originator of the idea to do Welcomes to Country before the conferences, and galleries and arts organisations followed suit.

Roberts started her radio career at Radio Redfern as a volunteer, before being offered a position at the ABC and subsequently applying for a position at Special Broadcasting Service (SBS). In 1989, she presented the SBS Television program First In Line along with Michael Johnson, becoming the first Indigenous presenter on prime-time television. Roberts was employed as presenter of Vox Populi, an SBS Television program, in 1990, becoming the first Indigenous Australian to present a prime time current affairs program. She also wrote, produced, and directed several documentaries for SBS, including In the gutter, no way?, offering a Black perspective on substance abuse, in 1990.

From 1992 until 2014, Roberts was a producer at the Indigenous media agency Vibe Australia, where she produced and was broadcaster on its Deadly Sounds national weekly radio program until 2012. Along with Vibe founder Gavin Jones, in 1995 she established the Deadly Awards, which ran for 20 years. During this period she also worked for Network 10 and Radio National (RN). In 1998 Roberts founded the Dreaming Festival, an Indigenous arts festival which ran in Sydney until 2004, relocating to become part of the Woodford Folk Festival, Queensland in 2004. She remained artistic director of the festival until 2009. The success of this event let to further appointments as director of large-scale public cultural events.

In 1995, Roberts was appointed Indigenous Cultural Advisor for the Olympic Games in Sydney. As part of this role, she was artistic director of the Aboriginal event in the first of four years of festivals, dubbed "The Festival of the Dreaming", first held in 1997. In 2000, she oversaw Awakening, the Indigenous segment of the opening ceremony of the 2000 Olympics choreographed by Stephen Page.

On the morning of each Australia Day (26 January) between 2003 and 2013, she directed the Woggan-ma-gule (later renamed WugulOra) ceremony at Barangaroo in Sydney, which celebrated First Nations' culture, honouring the past and celebrating the future. (Note: The ceremony has continued under a new name, WugulOra, which means "one mob".) From 2005 until 2007 she was a presenter on the Indigenous culture program Awaye! on RN. From 2008 until 2011, she was creative director for the Sydney New Year's Eve celebrations, which in 2016 she regarded as her greatest achievement. In 2010 Roberts was consultant festival director of the Garma Festival. In December 2012, she co-hosted the inaugural broadcast of National Indigenous Television (NITV) with Stan Grant from Uluru.

Having been a trustee of the Sydney Opera House from 1998 until 2006, Roberts was appointed head of Indigenous programming there in 2012, a job which was created for her. She held the position until March 2021. During her tenure there, in 2014 she established Homeground, an annual free outdoor festival featuring Indigenous music, dance, and culture. Roberts presented the weekly national program Deadly Voices from the House, which included live talks and a monthly podcast. In 2016 she oversaw Songlines, when the roof was lit up with Indigenous artwork, and on the eve of NAIDOC Week in 2018, one side of the Opera House was lit with art, as part of the daily "Badu Gili" projections.

Roberts was a driving force behind the Parrtjima Festival in Alice Springs, becoming its creative director in 2017 and curating the festival through to its 10th anniversary in 2025. Other major cultural event work included the 2003 Rugby World Cup, Vivid Sydney, the 2023 FIFA Women's World Cup opening ceremony, and Dubai Expo 2021. She worked on several film and TV projects, including documentary films about Tom E. Lewis (Balang) for SBS, and Henrietta Maree (Bukal).

In late 2025, Roberts was consulting development director on the NITV documentary The Colleano Heart, about the Colleanos, an Aboriginal circus family, created by Pauline Clague.

=== Stage productions ===
In 1988, Roberts performed in Akwanso, Fly South, which went on tour, playing at the Belvoir St Theatre in Sydney, ANU Arts Centre in Canberra, and Space Theatre in Adelaide. She co-starred with Rachael Maza and Lydia Miller in Belvoir's 1993 production of Louis Nowra's play Radiance. This was a groundbreaking play, that was the first of a number of touring performances of Indigenous plays. In 1998 she performed in a one-woman show Please Explain, written by Mick Barnes and directed by David Field at the Belvoir, and created the solo production Bible Boxing Love, which toured the east coast in 2008.

In October 2009, Roberts directed an international production of the opera Miracle in Brisbane by the Italian composer Giorgio Battistelli for the Brisbane Festival at the Judith Wright Centre of Contemporary Arts. In 2010, she directed and produced BodymARKS, which featured at the 2010 Darwin Festival. In 2012, she wrote and directed Yarrabah the Musical for Opera Australia, as well as directing and producing BodymARKS, which featured at the 2010 Darwin Festival.

In June 2016, she was co-creator and director of the theatrical piece Three Brothers at NORPA, which was inspired by a Bundjalung creation story. She was a board member at NORPA at that time.

In October 2019, Roberts's production Natives Go wild was staged at the Sydney Opera House. She was involved in the creation of the World Indigenous Art Orchestra from 2021 until her death.

In late August 2024, Roberts presented a new play, My Cousin Frank with Northern Rivers Performing Arts (NORPA) in Lismore and Byron Bay. It was about her cousin Frank Roberts, a boxer who was the first Aboriginal Australian to participate in the Olympics Games, at Tokyo in 1964. Directed by Kirk Page, Roberts narrated the story of "a family's journey from the tumultuous era of dispersal and silence to navigating a world controlled by government policy". The show included the story of Cubawee, the self-managed reserve established by her grandfather. My Cousin Frank was a lead-in to a planned production in 2025, called The First Aboriginal Olympian, and Roberts hoped to unite the community of Lismore in their pride in being the home of this significant man and family history. Despite having been diagnosed with terminal cancer, she performed the play at Sydney Opera House in December 2025, which was her last performance.

=== Other acting credits ===
Roberts appeared in the 1988 Australian teenage horror film Kadaicha (Stones of Death in the US), the German director Wim Wenders' 1991 film Until the End of the World, as well as several short films. She also had guest appearances in Home and Away, A Country Practice, and Blue Heelers.

== Other roles and activities ==
From 1979 until 1982, Roberts taught windsurfing.

Musée du Quai Branly

In 1991, she appeared in the documentary film Satellite Dreaming, about the development of media for and by Indigenous people, including the creation of Central Australian Aboriginal Media Association (CAAMA) in Alice Springs. In the film, Roberts talks about her role in First in Line, and how they built their audience. A website called Satellite Dreaming Revisited, funded by the Leverhulme Trust and developed by Tony Dowmunt at Goldsmiths, University of London (who had co-produced the 1991 film), in collaboration with Nicolas Lee and others at CAAMA Productions, was launched on 11 February 2022, hosted by the Menzies Australia Institute in London. Roberts appears in an interview on the website, which looks at progress made in Indigenous media since the original film, recorded in March 2018.

Roberts worked with the museum Quai Branly in Paris for its opening ceremony in 2006, and with other First Nations groups worldwide.

In 2010 she worked on the opening of the Japan Expo. After Ruby Hunter died in 2010, Roberts was artistic director of a series of tribute concerts to the musician and partner of Archie Roach, called Nukkan Ya Ruby. She was an ambassador for the Archie Roach Foundation. From 2012 until 2014 she was guest curator of the Queensland Performing Arts Centre's Clancestry Festival. Around 2014, she established Dance Rites, a dance competition for Indigenous dancers.

In October 2013 Roberts launched the Boomerang Festival at Byron Bay, an Indigenous multi-arts festival. As of 2016, she was creative director of Rhoda Roberts Gallery & Events, and still festival director of Boomerang Festval. She also undertook consultancy work for Northern Rivers Performing Arts (NORPA), JUTE Theatre in Cairns, and Opera Australia.

In 2016, Roberts, holding the Aboriginal flag, walked in the front row of a large march called Walk for Respect held in the streets of Lakemba, Sydney, to advocate for upholding legislative protections against racial hate speech.

In 2021 she became First Nations consultant for the National Institute of Dramatic Art (NIDA). In this role she recruited their First Nations team, and established structures in the organisation to ensure ongoing teaching of First Nations knowledge. In January 2022, she was still working for NIDA, director of Boomerang, and First Nations programming creative director at NORPA.

Roberts advised Robynne Quiggin, Pro-Vice-Chancellor for Indigenous Affairs and Engagement at University of Technology Sydney on Indigenous cultural and intellectual property (ICIP), and co-authored a work on protocols.

Late in life, Roberts was appointed the cultural lead at the national Aboriginal-owned newspaper, The Koori Mail, which had been co-founded by her father Pastor Frank Roberts, along with Owen Carriage, in May 1991. Roberts served on many boards over the course of her life, including the NSW Anti-Discrimination Board, Welcome to Country, Actors Equity, National Aboriginal and Islander Skills Development Association (NAISDA), the NSW Australia Day council, the Yothu Yindi Foundation, Indigenous Tourism Australia, Australia International Cultural Council, Playwriting Australia (chair), Sydney Opera House Trust, and Darling Harbour Authority. She wrote a novel, Tullymorgan.

== Recognition ==
=== Awards and honours ===
- 1997: Sidney Myer Facilitator's Award
- 1998: Deadly Award for Broadcasting
- 2016: Officer of the Order of Australia (AO) in the 2016 Queen's Birthday Honours for "distinguished service to the performing arts through a range of leadership and advocacy roles in the development, promotion and presentation of contemporary Indigenous culture"
- 2017: Centenary Sue Nattrass Awards, presented at the 18th Helpmann Awards by Live Performance Australia
- 2019: Ros Bower Award from the Australia Council
- 2022: Honorary Master of Fine Arts from NIDA
- 2025: Lifetime Achievement Award at the First Nations Media Awards
- 2026: Lifetime Achievement Award (posthumous) at the 2026 National NAIDOC Week Awards, for "elevating First Nations voices through storytelling, performance, creative direction and cultural leadership".

=== Other recognition ===
British photographer Penny Tweedie's image of Roberts, taken around 2000, is held by the National Portrait Gallery in Canberra. In March 2021, actress Deborah Mailman paid tribute to Roberts's power as a role model as well as her achievements and legacy during her tenure at the Sydney Opera House: "Her ability to change things. Her fierceness in making sure the Opera House doors are open to our mob. Creating those events not just for our mob but for all audiences alike to celebrate First Nations stories".

She was a highly respected Aboriginal elder, by the 2020s being afforded the title "Aunty". In September 2021, Roberts was named as the inaugural elder-in-residence at SBS Television, a new position, in which the office-holder was intended to be a "guide and counsel" on Indigenous content. The initial term of one year was extended, and she held the position until her death in March 2026. In September 2024 she was appointed a member of First Nations Arts, a newly established division of the government arts funding body Australia Council focused on Aboriginal and Torres Strait Islander arts, for a term of four years, also curtailed by her death.

== Personal life ==
Roberts's twin sister Lois, a hairdresser, was involved in a car accident around 1980, aged 20, and received severe brain damage. In July 1998, aged 38, Lois went missing, after being seen getting into a white car while hitchhiking near Nimbin. Police were dismissive and would not file a missing person's report when her family went to them within two days. Her body was found in Whian Whian State Conservation Area six months later. Investigators believe that she was held captive for around 10 days, and tortured and sexually abused before being murdered. The crime was still unsolved as of 2024, and the trauma continued to affect the family. Ivan Sen made a documentary film about the event and the grief of the family, called A Sister's Love. The film was screened in Lismore and aired on ABC TV in 2007. Lois left a daughter, Emily.

In 1993, Roberts married actor Bill Hunter, and they lived together and raised Emily together from the time she was born. Around 1999 he suddenly announced that he wanted to leave the marriage. Roberts did not know why until he visited her shortly before his death from liver cancer in 2011, when he told her that he had not wanted her to have to nurse him during his illness. They did not, however, get divorced.

Her later partner was Steven Field, a landscape designer and stonemason whom she met around the time of her sister's disappearance, and he stepped in as stepfather to Emily. They also had two children together. In 2019 they built a home at Jacky Bulbin Flats, in Bundjalung country. Roberts intended to hold a number of "women-only cultural retreats" in places across the Northern Rivers.

Roberts had a cousin called Frank, who was a champion boxer. There were a number of other boxers in the Roberts family, and the Robertses became known as "the fighting family of Lismore". As well as her family, people she has cited as her major influences include Djon Mundine, Oodgeroo Noonuccal, Lowitja O'Donoghue, Lydia Miller, and Peter Noble (producer of the Boomerang Festival).

== Later life, death, and legacy ==
Roberts was diagnosed with a rare form of ovarian cancer in late 2025. An event to celebrate her life and pay tribute to Roberts was held in December 2025 at the Sydney Opera House at the last performance of My Cousin Frank, attended by hundreds, including the Governor-General of Australia, Prime Minister Anthony Albanese, and many prominent arts leaders. She continued her work at NORPA and NIDA until her last few days.

She died on 21 March 2026, at the age of 66. A funeral was held for her on Bundjalung country in northern New South Wales on 31 March, with over 1,000 people in attendance. A smoking ceremony was held before the service, and Troy Cassar-Daley and Casey Donovan performed songs in the church. Djakapurra Munyarryun sang a song in his Yolngu language, and there was ceremonial dancing, including by the Jannawi Women's Dance Group. The service was streamed live and subsequently made available on various platforms. A series of tribute programs titled Rhoda Roberts AO: A Lasting Legacy aired on NITV and SBS On Demand from 31 March to 6 April.

In the 1980s Roberts introduced the term "Welcome to Country", which became a common practice for introducing events. While the original protocols of welcome lay in an ancient traditions among Aboriginal peoples, Roberts found the contemporary expression for it. She was inspired by her Uncle Lyle Roberts, who, with songman Uncle Dickee Donnelly, conducted a ceremony for the 1973 Aquarius Festival at Nimbin, on Bundjalung Country, welcoming visitors to their Country. According to Wesley Enoch: "In the 1980s she helped give the practice the language that became part of the national vocabulary: Welcome to Country... Through festivals, broadcasting, the Festival of the Dreaming, cultural institutions and events of enormous national visibility", and by the time of the 2000 Sydney Olympics, it played a central part. (Note: Wesley Enoch describes the background and evolution of the phrase, and Roberts' part in it, in his address for the inaugural Rhoda Roberts Oration. "Her gift was not invention so much as translation, not translation as simplification, and certainly not as making Aboriginal culture comfortable for non-Aboriginal audiences, but translation as finding contemporary forms through which old principles could keep doing their work. In the 1980s she helped give the practice the language that became part of the national vocabulary: Welcome to Country".) She also played a key role in establishing protocol manuals for Indigenous arts. Her legacy continues in the festivals she created and transformed, her impact on theatre and media, and her personal example of how important it is to engage with one another with respect.

Roberts raised the voices on Indigenous Australians by curating them on the international stage, and many Indigenous creatives and advocates paid tributes to her enormous influence on their careers and personal lives. After her death, the National Institute of Dramatic Art (NIDA) called Roberts "a towering cultural leader whose influence reshaped Australia's creative landscape and whose legacy will endure for generations... [She] was a visionary, a strategist and a relentless advocate for First Nations voices. She stood at the forefront of cultural leadership in this country, not only opening doors but rebuilding the rooms behind them. Her work ensured that First Nations stories were recognised as central to the nation's cultural life". Deputy chair of NIDA, Darren Dale, emphasised her personal influence on people in her orbit: she was "a deeply respected mentor, leader, and friend to so many of us", who affected the lives of individuals as well as the industry.

A tribute to Roberts was published on the Prime Minister's website, with quotes honouring her by Prime Minister Anthony Albanese, Minister for the Arts Tony Burke, and Malarndirri McCarthy, Minister for Indigenous Australians, for whom she "was a confidant and mentor" as a journalist in the 1990s. Burke and shadow Arts Minister Angie Bell paid tribute to her in Parliament. Brett Sheehy, director of Vivid Sydney, wrote that her "legacy is monumental – she altered the nation's cultural landscape in deep and everlasting ways". Many obituaries and tributes, including those by the prime minister and governor-general of Australia, referred to Roberts as "a trailblazer".

At the end of an interview in 2025, Roberts shared one of her father's sayings which she always remembers:

You know who you are. We've been here for thousands of years. How extraordinary that is. So always be generous and kind.

=== Rhoda Roberts Oration ===
The inaugural Rhoda Roberts Oration was held at Byron Writers Festival in August 2026, delivered by Wesley Enoch. Of her legacy, he said: "Three issues keep returning: identity, the sense of excellence, and the need for Blak spaces". He spoke at some length of the evolution of the ancient tradition that morphed into Roberts' phrase that became part of the national vocabulary, "Welcome to Country". Regarding "Blak spaces", he said "Real diversity is not achieved by inserting one representative into an existing structure. It occurs when there are enough people that nobody has to represent everybody".

=== Rhoda Roberts Trailblazer Award ===
In October 2026 the Rhoda Roberts Trailblazer Award was announced by Creative Australia as a new category within the Creative Australia First Nations Arts and Culture Awards, with the inaugural award to be given in 2027.
