= Mick Miller (Aboriginal statesman) =

Aboriginal Australian activist and politician

- Born: 16 January 1937; Palm Island, Queensland, Australia
- Died: 5 April 1998 (aged 61); Cairns, Queensland, Australia
- Resting place: Cairns
- Citizenship: Australian
- Education: Kelvin Grove Teachers College
- Occupations: Social activist, land rights campaigner and statesman
- Known for: Promoting and advocating Australian Aboriginal social justice, rights, and opportunity
- Board member of: Federal Council for the Advancement of Aborigines and Torres Strait Islanders (FCAATSI); Aboriginal Arts Board; North Queensland Land Council; Aboriginal Development Commission; State Tripartite Forum.
- Spouse(s): Pat O'Shane, Barbara Russell
- Children: Lydia, Marilyn & Michael Miller

Michael John "Mick" Miller (16 January 1937 – 5 April 1998) was a notable Aboriginal Australian activist, politician, and statesman who campaigned for most of his life seeking greater social justice, land rights, and improved life opportunities for Aboriginal Australians in North Queensland and the rest of Australia.

== Early life and education ==
Michael John Miller was born on 16 January 1937 on Palm Island, Queensland, son of Michael Miller Senior (Waanyi) and Cissie Miller (née Sibley) (Kuku Yalanji), and eldest of seven children (five girls and two boys).

Miller received his primary school education at St Michael's Catholic School at Palm Island. He completed his secondary schooling at Mt Carmel Boarding College at Charters Towers, Queensland.

By 1959 Miller had graduated from Kelvin Grove Teachers College in Brisbane, where he was one of the first Aboriginal Australians in Queensland to become a fully qualified teacher.

== Career ==
After qualifying as a teacher in 1959, Miller was posted to Cairns, Queensland to teach at the North Cairns State Primary School. Some years later he resigned from this position, having encountered some resistance and difficulties within the Department of Education regarding his political activities and attendance at a World Council of Indigenous Peoples in Samiland (Sweden).

In the mid-1960s he obtained some early political training and encouragement by joining the local Aboriginal Advancement League and later the Federal Council for the Advancement of Aborigines and Torres Strait Islanders (FCAATSI), during which time he attended a World Council of Indigenous Peoples meeting at Kiruna in Samiland (Sweden).

Having left teaching, Miller instead became an active member of the local branch of the Aboriginal Advancement League, and, by 1971-1972 had become vice-president of a Federal Council for the Advancement of Aboriginal and Torres Strait Islanders. He also helped establish the original, politically active and influential North Queensland Land Council, of which he was chair for some time.

Miller also sat as a board member of the Aboriginal Arts Board, and by the 1980s had become a Commissioner with the Aboriginal Development Commission (ADC) and, later, deputy chair of the ADC, from where he sought to promote economic development as the key to getting Aboriginal people off welfare and government dependence.

In 1985, the Commonwealth Government appointed Miller to head up a federal government review of employment, education and training, ultimately producing what came to be known as the "Miller Report". This was a significant Commonwealth Aboriginal and Torres Strait Islander training and employment policy document that was to become an Aboriginal employment and training blueprint with "pivotal impact on Government program policies for some time to come".

During the 1990s Miller chaired the State Tripartite Forum (a Queensland Government-sponsored Aboriginal health organisation) and in this way he became involved in many founding state policies and programs to improve the health of the Aboriginal people in Queensland.

== Activism ==
By the early 1970s Miller, along with other local Aboriginal Australians in the Cairns region (including ex-boxing champion and close friend Clarry Grogan), had become active members of a local predominantly Aboriginal branch of the Aboriginal Advancement League; had become effective advocates on the Federal Council for the Advancement of Aborigines and Torres Strait Islanders (FCAATSI); were involved in founding an Aboriginal Legal Service to bring legal assistance to Aboriginal peoples in the North Queensland region; and, with the formation of the North Queensland Land Council in January 1976 were campaigning for Aboriginal land rights.

It was during this period that, following national success in the 1967 referendum winning Aboriginal Australians the right to be included on Australian electoral rolls, Miller and Clarry Grogan chose in 1977 to accompany Fred Hollows and his National Trachoma and Eye Health Program team on visits to North Queensland Aboriginal and Torres Strait Islander reserves. While visiting Aboriginal and Torres Strait Islander communities, Miller and Grogan assisted people to sign onto electoral rolls, so confirming their reputation with the Queensland Government, and Premier Joh Bjelke-Petersen for being trouble-makers and political dissenters:

"On Thursday Island, our team encountered political discrimination and harassment against two Aboriginal liaison officers, Mick Miller, a Kalkadoon man, and Clarrie Grogan, a Kuku Yalanji man [..] At this time, the Queensland government did not encourage the inclusion of Aboriginal and Islander people on the electoral roll (a right they only gained after the 1967 referendum), and both incurred the government's wrath when it was alleged that they helped their people to sign on to the electoral roll [...] So-called political dissidence like this was not tolerated in Queensland .. Grogan and Miller were dismissed. Shortly after, the NTEHP in Queensland was stopped."

== Film: Couldn't Be Fairer ==
We treat them the same as everyone else - couldn't be fairer. Queensland Premier, Joh Bjelke-Petersen - 1983"

In 1984 Miller wrote and narrated a film named Couldn't Be Fairer (the expressed point of view of the then Premier of Queensland) about that state's treatment of Aboriginal peoples. The film was produced in collaboration with filmmaker Dennis O'Rourke to bring attention to the social injustices that were endured by Aboriginal people. The film included television footage and clips of politicians and businessmen openly expressing racist views (including Western Australian mining magnate, Lang Hancock suggesting mass sterilisation; a town mayor calling Aboriginal people "savages", and a Queensland Graziers Association spokesperson dividing people into "true Aborigines" and "hybrids".)

== Personal life ==
Miller married then-schoolteacher Pat O'Shane on 5 May 1962 at St Monica’s Catholic Cathedral in Cairns, and together they had two daughters, Lydia Caroline and Marilyn Rose Miller.

He met Queensland-born journalist Barbara Joyce Russell in 1973, she moved in with him in 1974. In 1977 Miller dissolved his marriage to O'Shane, and married Russell on 23 July 1978 in the Cairns Botanical Gardens. They had a son together, but split up in 1987.

== Death and legacy ==
Miller died from a heart seizure on 5 April 1998. It was reported that his funeral was attended by over a thousand people.

In 1998 Queensland's Land Rights newspaper summarised and described Miller and his life's contribution as follows:

Mick Miller was a respected elder statesman and a long-time mover and shaker in the Aboriginal struggle for social justice and land rights in Australia ... From early struggles and fights for recognition of basic rights for Indigenous people, such as proper health care, adequate housing, freedom of movement and land rights, Mick Miller led from the front ... one of the foremost national Indigenous leaders, a man of great vision, tremendous generosity of spirit ..., possessed of an infallible sense of humour, incredible optimism against all odds and great staying power in the Aboriginal movement ...
