= Hyllus Maris =

Aboriginal rights campaigner, educator

Hyllus Noel Maris (25 December 1933 – 4 August 1986) was an Aboriginal Australian activist, poet and educator. Maris was a Yorta Yorta woman. She was a key figure in the Aboriginal rights movement of the 1970s and 1980s, a poet, an educator and a scriptwriter.

== Early life ==
Hyllus Noel Maris was born on 25 December 1933 in Echuca, Victoria, and identified as a Yorta Yorta woman. Her mother, Geraldine Briggs, née Clements, was a Yorta Yorta and Wiradjuri woman. Her father, Selwyn Briggs, was a Wurundjeri and Yorta Yorta man. Both of her parents were prominent community activists; Maris was the third of their nine children. The family lived on the Cummeragunja Reserve until 1939, when Maris' parents participated in the Cummeragunja walk-off, a protest against the management of the reserve. They then settled at "The Flat" in the Mooroopna-Shepparton region of Victoria. Selwyn Briggs was the first Aboriginal man to be employed by Shepparton council. Maris studied dietetics and worked as a hospital dietician before moving to Melbourne in 1970.

== Activism and community work ==
In 1970 Maris, along with her mother and sister, was one of the founders of the National Council of Aboriginal and Island Women in Melbourne. She worked for the council as a liaison officer and in 1973 helped to set up the Victorian Aboriginal Legal Service and Victorian Aboriginal Health Service in Fitzroy, along with Alma Thorpe, Bruce McGuinness, and others. She helped to establish similar services in Queensland, and chaired the Victorian Council for Aboriginal Culture.

She travelled to London in 1977 to study social policy and community development with sociologist Richard Hauser, having won a Commonwealth scholarship, before returning to Melbourne where she continued her community work.

She was later chair of the Green Hills Foundation, which in 1983 helped to establish Worawa Aboriginal College, the first registered independent Aboriginal school in Victoria. It opened at Frankston and later moved to Healesville.

== Writing ==
With Sonia Borg, Maris co-wrote Women of the Sun, a 1981 television series about the experiences of Aboriginal women during the 200 years of British colonisation. The series won a United Nations Association Media Peace Award, a Banff Television Festival Award, two AWGIE (Australian Writers’ Guild) Awards and five Penguin (Television Society of Australia) Awards. It was later taught widely in Australian schools as a script (published in 1983) and a novel (1985).

She also wrote and published short stories, including "Concrete Box", "Joey Comes to the City" and "The Way Forgotten", and poetry, including "Spiritual Song of the Aborigine".

== Recognition and awards ==
In 1980, Maris received the FAW Patricia Weickhardt Award to an Aboriginal Writer.

== Death and legacy ==
Maris died of cancer on 4 August 1986 at Kew in Melbourne and was buried at Cummeragunja cemetery.

A primary school named in her memory opened at Ardmona in 1987, later closing in 1992.

La Trobe University established an annual memorial lecture in her honour in 1999.

A street in Franklin in the ACT is named for her.

A house at Melbourne Girls' College in Richmond, Victoria is named in her honour.

She was inducted into the Victorian Honour Roll of Women in 2001.
