= Maroochy Barambah =

Australian Aboriginal mezzo-soprano singer (1955–2026)

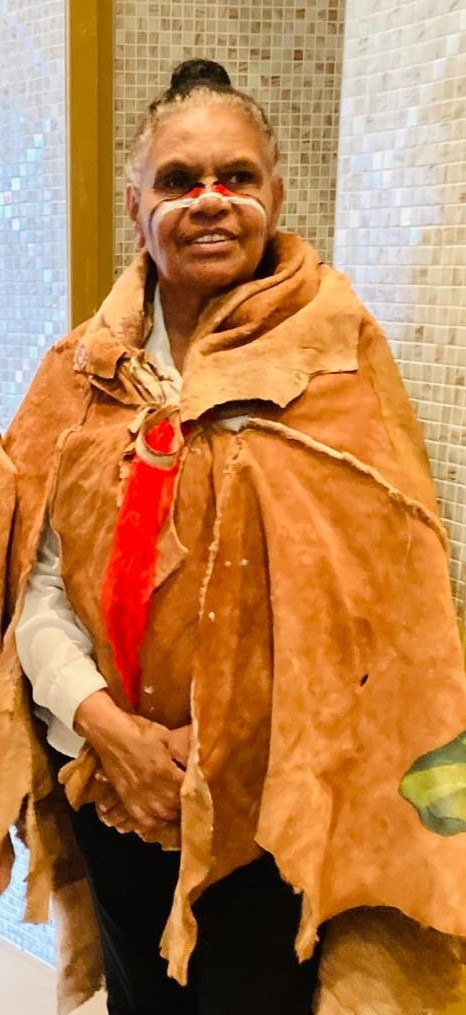
Barambah in 2021

Maroochy Barambah (12 February 1955 – 28 January 2026) was an Australian Aboriginal mezzo-soprano singer. She was a song-woman, law-woman and elder of the Turrbal people.

== Early life ==
Barambah was born Yvette Isaacs in Cherbourg, Queensland, on 12 February 1955. She was of the Turrbal-Gubbi Gubbi people and was a member of the Stolen Generations. She considered herself a beneficiary of her removal. As a tribute to her Aboriginality she took the names Maroochy (meaning "black swan") and Barambah (meaning "source of the western wind"). Maroochy Barambah was of Turrbal and Gubbi Gubbi ancestry with additional bloodline connections to Wakka Wakka, Kamilaroi and Birri Gubba Country.

== Career ==
Maroochy Barambah attended the Melba Conservatorium of Music in Melbourne and was Australia's first Aboriginal Dramatic Arts graduate in 1979, completing her studies at the Victorian College of the Arts in Melbourne. She became lead singer with indigenous rock band Quokka and participated in the Rock Against Racism concert in Hobart, Tasmania.

Her musical career spanned the genres of jazz, rock, musical theatre and classical opera. She rose to fame for her part in the 1989 Sydney Metropolitan Opera production of Black River, by Julianne Schultz and Andrew Schultz, an opera about black deaths in custody, and later starring in the 1993 film adaption which was awarded the Grand-Prix, Opera Screen at Opera Bastille, Paris. She also appeared in the indigenous musical Bran Nue Dae, the 1981 television series Women of the Sun and in the opera Beach Dreaming (written for and about her by Mark Isaacs).

She released two singles, one of which, "Aborigine", reached the top 10 on the U.S. Billboard Dance chart.

In 1991 she was awarded the inaugural Aboriginal performing arts fellowship by the Aboriginal Arts Committee to pursue classical opera singing as a career.

In 1993, Songwoman Maroochy became the first Australian to perform at the United Nations in New York in honour of the International Year for the World’s Indigenous Peoples.

She performed at the 1993 AFL Grand Final, singing "Waltzing Matilda" and "Advance Australia Fair".

In 1995, Barambah starred in the American opera Porgy & Bess and became the first Indigenous Australian to perform in an opera at the Sydney Opera House.

Barambah's translation of "Advance Australia Fair" into Turrubul, the native language of the Aboriginal people of the Brisbane region, was performed at the 2013 Indigenous All Stars Rugby League match at Suncorp Stadium, Brisbane, on 9 February 2013.

On 15 November 2014, Barambah featured in the Welcome to Country ceremony at the formal opening of the 2014 G-20 Australia Summit, held in Brisbane, Australia, performing in front of national leaders and international dignitaries.

== Death ==
Barambah died on 28 January 2026, at the age of 70.

== Discography ==
=== Albums ===
List of albums
Title	Details
Once Upon a Dreamtime	Released: 1997; Label: Daki Budtcha Records; Formats: CD

=== Singles ===
Title	Year
"Mongungi"	1994
"Aborigine"	1996

== Appears on ==
- Women of the sun (1981) miniseries
- Black River (1997) soundtrack - MusicArtsDance Films

== Awards ==
- 2000 - Honorary Senior Fellowship of the University of the Sunshine Coast for her outstanding and sustained contributions to the community.
