= Lydia Miller =

Australian actress and arts administrator

- Occupations: Arts administrator, actress, director,
- Notable work: Backlash; Deadly; Jindalee Lady

Lydia Miller is an Australian arts administrator, formerly an actress and theatre director. She is known for her acting in films in the 1980s and 90s, including Jindalee Lady (1992), and extensive work on stage, as well as directing plays and undertaking various roles in art administration, notably as executive director of the Aboriginal and Torres Strait Islander Arts Board of the Australia Council (now Creative Australia) from 1997 until 2021.

== Early life ==
Lydia Miller is the daughter of jurist Pat O'Shane and statesman Mick Miller, who were both activists for Aboriginal rights and advocates for Aboriginal people in Australia. She is a Kuku Yalanji and Waanyi woman from Far North Queensland.

== Career ==
=== Acting and directing ===
Miller featured in the films Backlash, Deadly and Jindalee Lady On the television she featured in R.F.D.S. and Heartland.

She played Sophia/Tatiana and Tuovi in Diary of a Madman at the Playhouse and Belvoir St Upstairs Theatre in 1989-90, which also toured to Moscow in 1992. In 1992 she played Cressy in the debut of Radiance at Belvoir St Upstairs, in a production directed by Rosalba Clemente. This play was written by Louis Nowra after Miller and Rhoda Roberts had asked him to write something for them. They were cast in two of the three main roles, with Rachael Maza playing the third.

She played Tocky in Capricornia at Belvoir St Upstairs in 1988, and Deborah Fielding in Corporate Vibes at Drama Theatre, Opera House in 1999,

She directed, with David Kennedy and Rhoda Roberts, Close to the Bone at Eora Centre in 1991, and with Mark Gould Gunjes at Belvoir St Upstairs Theatre in 1993.

=== Arts administration ===
Miller co-organised the National Black Playwrights Conference for 1989, and cofounded the Aboriginal National Theatre Trust. and a co-founder of the Aboriginal National Theatre Trust with Brian Syron, and Rhoda Roberts.

She was appointed executive officer and director of the Australia Council's Aboriginal and Torres Strait Islander Arts Board in 1994, remaining in the position until February 2021, when her replacement, Franchesca Cubillo, was announced.

Miller was project head for the inaugural Festival of the Dreaming in 1997, with Rhoda Roberts as founding artistic director. This was the first of four leading up to the 2000 Summer Olympics in Sydney, before the festival relocated to Woodford, Queensland.

After leaving the Arts Council in 2021, Miller was appointed program director for the Indigenous Women's Leadership Program "Deadly Women". She was also cultural producer for the Shine on Gimuy Festival, a First Nations multi-arts cultural Festival held in Cairns from 2023, headed by artistic director Rhoda Roberts.

In April 2025 she was appointed interim CEO of Agency, an Aboriginal and Torres Strait Islander-led not-for-profit that creates cultural and other activities in Australia and overseas that provide opportunities for Indigenous people. She was succeeded in this role in January 2026 by Glenn Iseger-Pilkington.

Miller has also had experience in public policy and administration in health, community services, and criminal justice.

== Board memberships and other activities ==
As of April 2025 Miller was chair of the Queensland Theatre Company Indigenous Reference Group, a member of the QMusic board, and a member of the Cairns Music Industry Working Group. In April 2025, she was appointed to the board of the Circa Contemporary Circus.

== Recognition ==
In 2016, Rhoda Roberts said that the living person she most admired was Lydia Miller, as a "true Cultural Custodian who pass[es] on knowledge to ensure there is wealth and richness of understanding the environment and country and they do it with such humility and spirit of generosity always astounds me".

In 2020, Miller presented the second Awaye anniversary lecture on Radio National. In her talk, she explored Australian Aboriginal identity.
