= Women of the Sun =

- Genre: Historical drama
- Written by: Sonia Borg and Hyllus Maris
- Directed by: James Ricketson; David Stevens; Stephen Wallace; Geoffrey Nottage
- Country of origin: Australia
- Original languages: English, Yolngu Matha
- No. of episodes: 4

Production
- Producer: Bob Weis
- Editor: Edward McQueen-Mason
- Running time: 60 mins

Original release
- Network: SBS; ABC
- Release: July 1982

Related
- Women of the Sun: 25 Years Later

Women of the Sun is an Australian historical drama television miniseries that was broadcast on SBS and later ABC. The series, co-written by Sonia Borg and Hyllus Maris, was composed of four 60-minute episodes to portray the lives of four Aboriginal women in Australian society from the 1820s to the 1980s. It was the first series that dealt with such subject matter, and later received several awards including two Awgies and five Penguin Awards following its release. It also won the United Nations Association of Australia Media Peace Award and the Banff Grand Prix in 1983.

== Plot ==
The first episode, titled "Alinta: The Flame", dealt with the first contact between tribal Aboriginal people and Europeans. Set in 1820s, the story begins when two English convicts are found washed up on the beach by the Nyari. They are nursed back to health by the tribe, providing them with food and shelter, despite warnings by the tribal elders. The tribe is eventually encountered by early Australian settlers searching for grazing land. Their culture and rituals are threatened by these newcomers, who begin to settle on their lands, and leads to the annihilation of the tribe. Alinta (Yangathu Wanambi) and her child are the only survivors and the episode ends with Alinta determined that her daughter "carry the torch for her culture and the future".

"Maydina: The Shadow" takes place in the 1860s and follows a young Aboriginal woman, Maydina, who lives with a group of seal-hunters. It is revealed that she was abducted by the hunters as a child and, after years of abuse by her captors, she attempts to escape with her half-caste daughter Biri. They are taken in by Mrs. McPhee, founder and head of a church mission, where mother and daughter are separated when Maydina is employed into service with the church. While there, she and another Aboriginal man fall in love and attempt to leave with Biri so that can return to their traditional life and culture in the Australian Outback which the Europeans think is devil art. Mrs. McPhee sends troopers after the three and soon catch up to them. The man is shot and killed by the soldiers while Maydina's child is presumably taken away from her permanently.

"Nerida Anderson" is the third episode in the series and is based on the real-life events of the "Cummeragunja walk-off" which transpired in 1939. The political actions of the titular character Nerida (Justine Saunders), are loosely based on the exploits of Aboriginal civil rights leader Jack Patten. Nerida is a young and rebellious Aboriginal woman, who returns to the government-established Aboriginal reserve after working in the city as a bookkeeper. She finds the conditions on the reservation have seriously deteriorated since leaving and attempts to encourage the rest of the tribe to improve conditions themselves. Her activities are opposed by the reserve manager who, in anger, orders Nerida and her family tried for treason. The charge is dismissed but the manager keeps his position. As the young men of the tribe are drafted into the Australian Army during the Second World War, life on the reservation continues to worsen. Finally, Nerida leads her family and the rest of the tribe to leave the reserve, never to return.

The fourth and final segment, "Lo-Arna", is set in the then-present 1980s and focuses on 18-year-old Ann Cutler, who lives with her adoptive parents, Doug (Max Phipps) and Joy Cutler (Fiona Spence), in a small country town. Ann's relationship with her parents suddenly changes when she discovers she is of Aboriginal descent and not French Polynesian as she believed. She also learns that she is the biological child of her adopted father Doug Culter and Alice Wilson, an Aboriginal woman who lives in a nearby shanty town. In an attempt to "resolve her emotional turmoil", she considers contacting her birth mother.

== Characters ==
=== 1: Alinta: The Flame ===
- Young Alinta (Naykakan Munung)
- Alinta (Yangathu Wanambi)
- Murra (Gordon Lunyupi)
- McNab (William Zappa)
- Towradgi (Gatja Munyarryun)
- Turuga (Garrala Gurruwiwi)
- Morrorra (Walumarri Wunungmurra)
- Kiah (Wurrandilngawuy)
- Finlay (Adam Joseph)
- Waroo (Nippuranydja Munungurr)
- Young Wonda (Beyawuy Murawili)
- Goodman (Tony Hawkins)
- Fisher (David Scott)
- Bosun (Ken Grant)
- Stuckey (Reg Evans)

=== 2: Maydina: The Shadow ===
- Maydina (Mawiyul Yanthaluway)
- Mrs. McPhee (Julia Blake)
- Charlie/Joala (Freddie Reynolds)
- Rev. Bligh (Bill Johnson)
- Biri (Sonia Pozzana)
- Little Johnny (Doug Briggs)
- Edward (James Laurie)
- Maggie (Essie Coffey)
- Matilda (Anne Saward)
- Mr. Johnson (Roger Oakley)
- Old Tommy (Wandjuk Marika)
- Old Timothy (Alfred Austin)
- Muller (Michael Duffield)
- Alf (Chris Haywood)
- Joe (Tommy Dysart)

=== 3: Nerida Anderson ===
- Nerida Anderson (Justine Saunders)
- Mr. Felton (Graham Rouse)
- Mrs. Felton (Felicity Gordon)
- Grannie Anderson (Minnie Patten)
- Ivy Anderson (Lorraine Mafi-Williams)
- Bill Anderson (Stan Roach)
- Ron Anderson (Paul Pryor)
- Auntie Rachel (Joyce Johnson)
- Andy (Monty Prior)
- Maisie (Yvette Isaacs, a.k.a. Maroochy Barambah)
- Frank Reilly (Ed Thurley)
- Mr. Short (Robin Cuming)
- Mr. Watson (Geoff Parry)
- Peter (Jack Charles)
- Eddy (Wesley Williams)
- Alma (Phemie Day)

=== 4: Lo-Arna ===
- Ann Cutler (Michelle Lanyon)
- Doug Cutler (Max Phipps)
- Joy Cutler (Fiona Spence)
- Alice Wilson (Eva Birrit)
- Val Pearce (Mollie Dyer)
- Nick (David Cameron)
- Jimmy Randle (Bob Maza)
- Peter Randle (Michael Cockatoo)
- Jamie Randle (Gordon Edwards)
- Grannie Johnson (Margaret Tucker)
- Secretary (Amanda Muggleton)
- Receptionist (Adele Lewin)
- Public Servant (James Wright)
- President (Osvaldo Maione)

== Production ==
The original concept for the series, in which the colonisation of Australia would be told through the eyes of Aboriginal women, came from Aboriginal poet, sociologist and educator Hyllus Maris. She formed a successful collaboration with Sonia Borg, an award-winning screenwriter, and spent five years working on the script.

A television series was eventually commissioned by SBS Television, partly because of the efforts of producer Bob Weis, who later recalled his first meeting with the network.

When the series was first commissioned by SBS I'd read the script, loved it, made a commitment to the writers to make it, sent the scripts to SBS and I got a phone call one week later from Bruce Gyngell (SBS' founding manager) who, fortunately, had been in Canberra the week before.
Someone asked him in a senate committee hearing "what are you doing about Aboriginal Australia?" And he replied, "I just got these scripts that I'm going to do". He rang me and said, "Bob, I love the scripts, we're going ahead".

The series was directed by James Ricketson, David Stevens, Stephen Wallace and Geoffrey Nottage, then some of the top directors in the industry, and shot on location in Victoria. While many of the Aboriginal cast members were non-professional actors, the series also featured a number of high-profile television actors and actresses, including William Zappa, Adam Joseph, Reg Evans, Julia Blake, Roger Oakley, Chris Heywood, Tommy Dysart, Justine Saunders, Graham Rouse, Robin Cuming, Max Phipps, Fiona Spence, Bob Maza and Amanda Muggleton. Singer, Yvette Isaacs (Maroochy Barambah) appeared in episode 3. Australian Indigenous rights activists Essie Coffey and Wangjuk Marka also made a cameo appearances.

Yolngu artist Banduk Marika worked as a translator on the series.

== Reception ==
The series was aired on SBS in Sydney and Melbourne in 1982, and nationally on ABC in 1983. Its unique and ground-breaking storytelling challenged conventional Australian history and received almost immediate international and national acclaim following its release. Women of the Sun won several awards during the next two years including two Awgies, five Penguin Awards, the United Nations Media Peace Prize and the Banff Grand Prix.

The series, more importantly, for the first time provided the opportunity to tell the Aboriginal story through the eyes of its women, in their own language, and made available to national audience. It also had a significant impact on Aboriginal communities as the series brought up key issues affecting its culture.

In 2006, series producer Bob Weis interviewed the leading actresses who appeared in each of the four episodes. He then discussed with them the impact it had had on their lives, as well as on his own, and the issues facing them and the Aboriginal culture today. A feature-length documentary was released based on these interviews titled Women of the Sun: 25 Years Later and which premiered at the Melbourne International Film Festival.

The series was presented by Macleay Museum at the University of Sydney's Old Geology Lecture Theatre on 25 January 2007, the day before the anniversary of Australian colonization. It was accompanied by the final viewing of the Macleay Museum's "Living Water" art exhibition which featured "artistic expressions of Aboriginal identity".
