= Vox Populi (TV series) =

Vox Populi was a weekly current affairs program broadcast by the Australian public broadcaster Special Broadcasting Service television channel "SBS TV" (now SBS One).

The program first went to air in July 1986. Vox Populi was broadcast for nine years. The program's first presenter was journalist Vladimir Lusic. In 1990 he was replaced as presenter by Rhoda Roberts. Roberts was the first indigenous Australian to present a prime time current affairs program.
