= Fiona Spence =

Australian actress

- Born: c. 1946 (age 79–80); Bromley, Kent, England, UK
- Occupation: Actress (Retired)
- Years active: 1973–2019
- Known for: Prisoner (TV series) as Vera Bennett (1979-1981); Home and Away as Celia Stewart (1988–1990, 2000, 2002, 2005, 2012–2013)
- Notable work: Glenview High (TV series); Packed to the Rafters (TV series) as Eleanor McCormick (recurring)
- Partner(s): Denise Morgan (1979–2011)

Fiona Spence (born c. 1946) is an English-born retired stage and television actress and drama teacher. She is known for her television roles in Australia including Prisoner (1979–81) as prison officer Vera "Vinegar Tits" Bennett and Home and Away as the unlucky-in-love spinster Celia Stewart (1988–90).

She has made numerous returns to Home and Away reprising her role of Celia. Her other television roles include Packed to the Rafters as Eleanor McCormick (2013). Alongside her former Prisoner co-stars Val Lehman and Colette Mann (who played inmates Bea Smith and Doreen Anderson respectively), Spence was one of three actresses who filmed cameos for the Prisoner remake series Wentworth in 2019, in what was intended to be the series finale. However, the series was unexpectedly renewed for another 20 episodes and the cameos were cut and never went to air.

== Early life ==
Fiona Spence was born in c. 1946 in Bromley, Kent, (now in Greater London) United Kingdom to an Irish mother, Pauline, (née Connolly) and an Australian-born father, Dr. John Walton Spence, whilst serving with the British Army, Fiona's parents married in 1940, in Jaffa, Mandatory Palestine. When her father finally left the service, Spence and her family (including her sister-in-law, casting director Kerry Spence) moved to Hong Kong when she was three and then to Australia when she was six. After leaving school, she was trained as a secretary and later travelled to Montreal where she was a hostess for the Australia Pavilion (Expo 67) at the Canadian Expo.

After living in Canada for a year, she left for England and lived in London for a time working as a saleswoman for the Fortnum & Mason department store. It was while seeing several plays in London's West End, she became interested in acting. She was engaged aged 22, but broke it off. After returning to Australia, wanting to become an actress, she trained with The Independent Theatre.

== Early career ==
Spence began acting professionally during the early 1970s, when she was already 27. She became engaged a second time, but again the relationship ended around 1978. While living in Sydney, she appeared in her first television role in the teen drama Glenview High in 1977.

== Television roles ==
=== Prisoner ===
In 1979 she first found fame playing the sadistic, authoritarian prison officer Vera Bennett, in cult soap opera Prisoner. It was on the set of Prisoner that she first met her long-term life partner, scriptwriter Denise Morgan. They remained together until Morgan's death in 2011. The character of Vera Bennett, one of the show's main antagonists, was nicknamed "Vinegar Tits" by the inmates. The role continued from the show's premiere in 1979 until 1981, appearing in episodes 1 to 224. Spence, who played Vera with her hair in a tight bun, was hardly recognisable if she let her hair down. Spence herself commented she wasn't readily recognised in real life as Vera whenever she wore her hair down.

When producer John McRae took over day-to-day running of the series in 1981, plans were made to write Spence out of the series. Her character had become immensely popular during her two-years on the show and, when news of her departure was announced, the Ten Network received at least 100 phone calls and countless fan mail asking for Spence to remain. Spence however quietly left the show later stating "I loved playing Vera. But it was time to wash that dame right out of my hair."

=== Home and Away and others ===
During her last year with Prisoner, Spence appeared in supporting roles in both the television mini-series Women of the Sun and the television movie I Can Jump Puddles, which also featured a number of other former Prisoner co-stars including Sigrid Thornton, Sandy Gore, Lesley Baker and Anne Phelan.

From 1988 until 1990, Spence became well known for playing spinster Celia Stewart in Home and Away. While working on the show, she attended Monash University earning an arts degree in English. She also made sporadic television appearances during the next several years as a celebrity guest on game shows Cluedo and Sale of the Century as well as making a guest appearance on the television series Law of the Land and as Eleanor McCormick in Packed to the Rafters.

In 2018, Spence joined former Prisoner co-stars Colette Mann and Val Lehman in a cameo for series seven of Wentworth in the what was intended to be the final episode of the series, but the show was unexpectedly renewed for a further 20 episodes and the cameo scene was cut and never aired. Mann revealed in 2022, during an interview with podcast series Talking Prisoner, the cameo was the three of them standing in the yard and waving goodbye to one of the characters.

== Theatre and pantomime ==
In March 1984, Spence starred alongside Geraldine Cook in the 60-minute "softcore feminist" black comedy Mums, at Melbourne's La Mama Theatre. The play was about the "manic lives" of two trapped women in a high-rise flat, in which Spence played the tough, aggressive Jo, while Cook played the more light-hearted Toots. She played Bonnie in the 1986 Melbourne Theatre Company production of the play Hurlyburly at the Russel Street Theatre.

She returned to the theatre in the early 1990s recreating the role of Vera Bennett in a British stage play version of Prisoner. She also starred in a theatrical pantomime of Aladdin with fellow Home and Away co-star Greg Benson at the Theatre Royal, in Hanley, Stoke-on-Trent during December 1991 and January 1992, as well as a short-lived stage show, Lipstick Dreams, in the United Kingdom.

== Filmography ==
=== Film ===
Year	Title	Role	Notes
1984	Lysistrata		TV movie
2013	Mirrors	Lola	Short film

=== Television ===
Year	Title	Role	Notes
1978	Glenview High	Maxine	Season 1, episode 29: "After the Loving"
1979–1981	Prisoner	Vera Bennett	Seasons 1–3, 222 episodes
1979	The Franky Doyle Story	Vera Bennett	TV movie (edited from episodes of Prisoner)
1981	Women of the Sun	Joy Cutler	Mniseries, episode 4: "Lo-Arna"
1981	I Can Jump Puddles	Mrs. Wilson	Miniseries, episode 4: "Crutches are Nothing"
1983	Home	Carol Davidson	TV series, episodes 29–32
1983; 1984	Cop Shop	Nora Fitzgerald / Heather Ramsay	Episodes 456, 537
1985	The Fast Lane	Peg	Season 2, episode 6: "Holding the Mirror up to Itself"
1988–1990, 2000, 2002, 2005, 2012–2013	Home and Away	Celia Stewart	Seasons 1–3 (regular); Seasons 13, 15, 18, 25–26, 37 (guest) 551 Episodes
1990	Richard & Judy		1 episode
1990	The Nightshift		1 episode
1992	Acropolis Now	Joan	Season 5, episodes 2 & 13
1992	Cluedo		1 episode
1993	Law of the Land	Magistrate Maggie Mulcahy	Season 2, episodes 1-14
1995	The Feds: Vengeance	Lisa	Miniseries
2013	Packed to the Rafters	Eleanor McCormack	Season 6, episodes 1-6 & 11-12
2019	Wentworth	New prisoner	Season 7, episode 10 (scene deleted)

=== Other appearances ===
Year	Title	Role	Notes
1995	Sale of the Century: Battle of the TV Classics	Contestant (with Val Lehman, Colette Mann & Maggie Kirkpatrick)	1 episode
2016	All Star Family Feud	Contestant (with Ian Smith, Val Lehman & Colette Mann)	1 episode

== Theatre ==
Year	Title	Role	Notes
1984	Mums	Jo	La Mama Theatre, Melbourne
1986	Hurlyburly	Bonnie	Russell St Theatre, Melbourne with MTC
1990	Prisoner	Vera Bennett	UK tour
1990	Snow White and the Seven Dwarfs	The Wicked Queen	Theatre Royal, Hanley
1991	Lipstick Dreams		UK tour with Fairbank Productions
1991–1992	Aladdin	The Empress	Theatre Royal, Hanley
1993	St James Infirmary	Norma Lockwood	Russell St Theatre, Melbourne with MTC
