= Eva Johnson =

Aboriginal Australian poet, actor and playwright (born 1946)

- Born: 1946 (age 79–80); Daly River, Northern Territory
- Other name: Eva Birrit (film credit)
- Occupation: Playwright
- Awards: 1993 Red Ochre Award

Eva Knowles Johnson (born 1946) is an Aboriginal Australian poet, actor, director, and playwright. She is known for directing the first Aboriginal Women's Arts Festival in Adelaide, South Australia, in 1985, for which she wrote the play Tjindarella.

== Early life and education ==
Eva Knowles Johnson was born in 1946 at Daly River in the Northern Territory. She belongs to the Malak Malak people, an Aboriginal people of the Northern Territory. At the age of two, Johnson was taken from her mother and placed on a Methodist Mission on Croker Island, Northern Territory. Aged 10, she was transferred to an orphanage in Adelaide.

Johnson gained an associate diploma in community development at the South Australian Institute of Technology and also studied for a degree in Aboriginal studies at the University of Adelaide.

== Career ==
Johnson has worked as an enrolled nurse, poet, actor, director, playwright, and teacher.

She began writing in 1978. Her first poem became the title of the first play ever produced by Black Theatre in Adelaide, When I Die You'll All Stop Laughing. The satirical revue was performed in the Union Hall at the University of Adelaide in 1978.

Johnson played the part of Alice Wilson (credited as Eva Birrit) in the fourth segment of the 1981 award-winning TV series Women of the Sun.

=== Aboriginal Women's Arts Festival and Tjindarella ===
Johnson's play Tjindarella examined the oppression of Aboriginal Australians and highlighted the effects of government policy on the forced removal of children from their parents and culture.

In February to March 1985 Johnson directed the first Aboriginal Women's Arts Festival in Adelaide, at which Tjindarella was performed from 1 to 16 February 1985. (Note: It was reported int at least two sources as being performed at the Adelaide Fringe Festival in 1984, but this is not correct, as there is no record to confirm this in Trove, and according to AustLit, the play was written for the Aboriginal Women's Arts Festival.) A grassroots group called Black Women In Focus had been formed in 1983, dedicated to organising this nation-first gathering of Aboriginal women artists. The event took place over two and a half weeks, and showcased Aboriginal women's art, performance, and ceremony in high-profile venues in Adelaide, such as the Adelaide Festival Centre, for the first time. The group had to apply for an exemption to the Sex Discrimination Act to bar men from attending a sacred women's ceremony on the River Torrens, which as run by senior law women of a desert people.

At least two runs of T-shirts were printed for the event: one in yellow, with the word "Tjindarella" and a design used for the play posters; and a white T-shirt emblazoned with the words "1st Aboriginal Women's Arts Festival Adelaide 1985", with both designs now held in the National Museum of Australia. An original poster for Tjindarella is also held at the museum, showing the subtitle "Cinderella in black with dance, music and song".

The festival was remembered by participants 40 years later, including Wakka Wakka woman Jo Willmot, who had been working in the Office of the Status of Women at the time it was conceived. In March 2025, the Festival Centre mounted the "Black Women BACK in Focus" retrospective exhibition, organised by First Nations programming executive Celia Coulthard. The displays included newspaper clippings, photographs, and interviews.

=== Other plays ===
In 1988, her play Murras was produced at the Adelaide Fringe, and later for the Black Theatre Season at Belvoir Street Theatre in Sydney. In 1989 Johnson's play Mimini's Voices was produced by Magpie Theatre in Adelaide and later restaged in 1990 as part of the Hiroshima Arts Festival in Japan, where it won the Festival Peace Prize awarded by the Lord Mayor of Hiroshima.

In January 1990 her play What Do They Call Me? was produced at the inaugural Lesbian Festival in Melbourne, directed by Venetia Guillot and performed by Johnson. It was also performed at the Lion Arts Centre for the 1990 Adelaide Fringe Festival, at the 4th International Feminist Book Fair in Barcelona, Spain, and in Sydney in 1991. The play tells the story of one family's experience of the Stolen Generation as told by the mother and her two daughters, with all three characters performed by Johnson. Three actors performed the play in a production directed by Eva Grace Mullaley in Perth in 2014. The play was included in Australian gay and lesbian plays, edited by Bruce Parr and published in 1996.

Other plays written by Johnson in the 1990s include Heart Beat of the Earth, Two Bob in the Quid, and Mimini's Voices. Johnson's writing addresses themes of cultural identity, Aboriginal Australian women's rights, the Stolen Generations, land rights, slavery, sexism, and homophobia.

== Other activities ==
In 1987, Johnson was writer/director of the first National Black Playwrights Conference in Canberra, organised by Brian Syron, from which the Aboriginal National Theatre Trust was developed.

As of 2012, Johnson was living in Adelaide, and was invited to various educational institutions as a guest speaker.

== Influence and awards ==
Johnson contributed to the representation of Aboriginal women on the stage.

In 1985, Johnson was awarded the Aboriginal Artist of the Year Award.

In 1993, she was awarded the inaugural Red Ochre Award by the Australia Council for the Arts, which is presented to an outstanding Aboriginal Australian or Torres Strait Islander artist who has made substantial contributions to arts and culture nationally or internationally.

== Selected works ==
- "A letter to my mother" (poem, 1985)
- When I Die You'll All Stop Laughing (poem and then play)
- Faded Genes (revue, 1979)
- Mimini's Voices
- Murras (play, 1989)
- Onward To Glory (play)
- Tjindarella (play, 1985)
- What do they call me (play, 1990)
- Heartbeat of the Earth
