= Delta Downs Station =

Pastoral lease in Queensland

Coordinates: 16.99244°S 141.31471°E

Location in Queensland

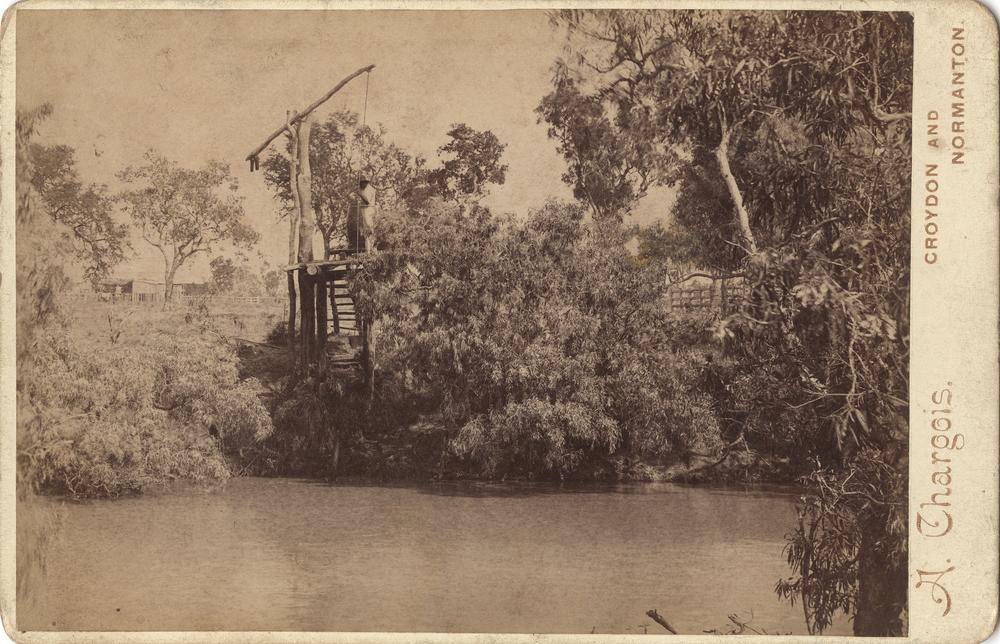
Landing stage on the Delta Downs Station ca. 1895

Delta Downs Station, also known as Morr Morr, is a pastoral lease that currently operates as a cattle station in Queensland.

== Description ==
The property is situated approximately 74 kilometres (46 mi) north east of Karumba and 174 kilometres (108 mi) south of Kowanyama in the Gulf Country of Queensland. It is well watered by 15 miles (24 km) double frontage on the Gilbert River and more along Smithsons River. Numerous creeks flow through the property, including Lily, Delta, Rose, Duck, Sandy and Spring Creeks.

Currently the property occupies an area of 4,000 square kilometres (1,544 sq mi) and has approximately 126 kilometres (78 mi) of frontage along the Gulf of Carpentaria. The station is an aggregation of three leases: Delta Downs, Karumba Downs and the Maggieville outstation.

== History ==
The station had been established at some time prior to 1889 and in 1895 was trading cattle and owned by the London Bank of Australia. In 1901 the 472.5-square-mile (1,224 km^{2}) property was put up for auction. It was stocked with 10,500 head of cattle and 200 horses with a homestead and four sets of yards. The property was described as compact surrounded on three sides by water with one 60 square miles (155 km^{2}) bullock paddock fenced.

In 1912 the executors of Captain T. W. Robinson put Delta Downs as well as Maggieville and Milgarra Stations up for auction. At this time Delta Downs had a total area of 638 square miles (1,652 km^{2}) and was stocked with 9,000 head of cattle and 400 horses. The tenure of the leasehold area was due to expire in 1930 with the property nearly completely fenced.

In 1931 the station manager, Mr. H. J. Nielson, committed suicide by shooting himself.

The federal government acquired the property in 1983 for A$2 million with the intention of transferring the lease to the traditional owners, the Kurtijar people.

The property was featured at the end of the 1984 film, Couldn't Be Fairer. The million acre property is one of the largest Aboriginal owned cattle stations in Australia, and supports a herd of 43,000 cattle. The property is regarded as a model of Aboriginal enterprises and when the cattle industry is going well the station supports 30 salaried workers and puts A$2 million back into the local community. In 1988 the station returned a profit of approximately A$800,000 and was expected to be one of the first properties to meet new tuberculosis and brucellosis eradication standards.

In 2002 the property was officially handed over to the Kurtijar Aboriginal people by ATSIC; it had been valued at about A$20 million at this time.

By 2013 the property was A$1 million in debt and had to lay off 19 of their workers. Since 2011 the station had suffered from the demise in the live export trade, severe drought and being placed under quarantine from suspected Bovine Johne's Disease, meaning no cattle can leave the property for a period of three years.

== See also ==
- List of ranches and stations
