= Black River (1993 film) =

- Directed by: Kevin Lucas
- Written by: Kevin Lucas
- Produced by: Aanya Whitehead; Kevin Lucas; Sue Maslin
- Starring: Akiko Nakajima; James Bonnefin; Maroochy Barambah; John Pringle; Bangarra Dance Theatre
- Cinematography: Kim Batterham
- Edited by: Dany Cooper
- Music by: Andrew Schultz
- Release date: 1993
- Running time: 55 minutes
- Country: Australia
- Language: English

Black River is a 1993 Australian film directed and produced by Kevin Lucas and starring Aboriginal mezzo-soprano Maroochy Barambah. It is a film adaptation of an eponymous opera (1989) by Andrew Schultz and Julianne Schultz that tells the story of an Aboriginal death in custody and its consequences. The film was nominated for the 1993 Australian Film Institute Award for Award Best Screenplay and won the 1994 Montréal International Festival of Films on Art Jury Prize for Adapted Screenplay of the Year.
