= Jindalee Lady =

- Directed by: Brian Syron
- Written by: Briann Kearney
- Produced by: Briann Kearney
- Starring: Lydia Miller; Patrick Ward
- Production company: Donobri International Communications
- Release date: 1992
- Running time: 86 mins
- Country: Australia
- Language: English

Jindalee Lady is a 1992 Australian film about an Aboriginal Australian woman who is a successful fashion designer. Directed by Brian Syron, it is the first feature film directed by an Aboriginal person in Australia. It is also notable for featuring dancers from the Bangarra Dance Theatre.

== Plot ==
Lauren, a successful and ambitious Aboriginal fashion designer, discovers that her husband David, a white record producer, has been having affairs, and decides to leave him. She meets Greg, a black filmmaker who inspires her to rediscover her Aboriginality.

== Cast and crew ==
- Lydia Miller as Lauren
- Patrick Ward as David
- Michael Leslie as Greg
- Joanna Lambert as Julia
- Bangarra Dance Theatre as dancers, including
  - Raymond D. Blanco as lead dancer
  - Silvia Blanco as lead dancer
- Larissa Behrendt as a model
- David Banula Marika as didgeridu player
- Larry Yapuma Gurruwiwi as didgeridu player
- Su Cruickshank as singer
- Lillian Crombie as a dresser
- Justine Saunders

== Production ==
Filming took place in Sydney from 1988 to 1990. Scenes were shot in the Leichhardt Japanese-themed home of renowned chef Tetsuya Wakuda, while the fashion parades were filmed in the AFTRS studios. Owing to funding delays, the first print was only released on 10 September 1992.

== Release ==
The film did not have a theatrical release in Australia, but it was given a charity screening in Canberra at The Playhouse on 13 May 1992 and screened at the Brisbane International Film Festival later in the year. It also travelled to the Hawaii International Film Festival and was also shown in Edmonton, Alberta, in Canada.

== Reception ==
Described as a soap opera by several reviewers, the film received a lukewarm reception, but Miller, Ward and Leslie were praised for their performances.

Marcia Langton, in her work commissioned by the Australian Film Commission (AFC), Well I Heard It on the Radio and I Saw It on the Television (1993), gives the film a detailed and somewhat scathing treatment in the context of an academic analysis of black cinema in general, but it is questioned whether she actually saw the film. Because of this, Langton was drawn into the feud that existed at the time between Syron and the AFC.
