= Bowraville murders =

Unsolved murders in New South Wales, Australia

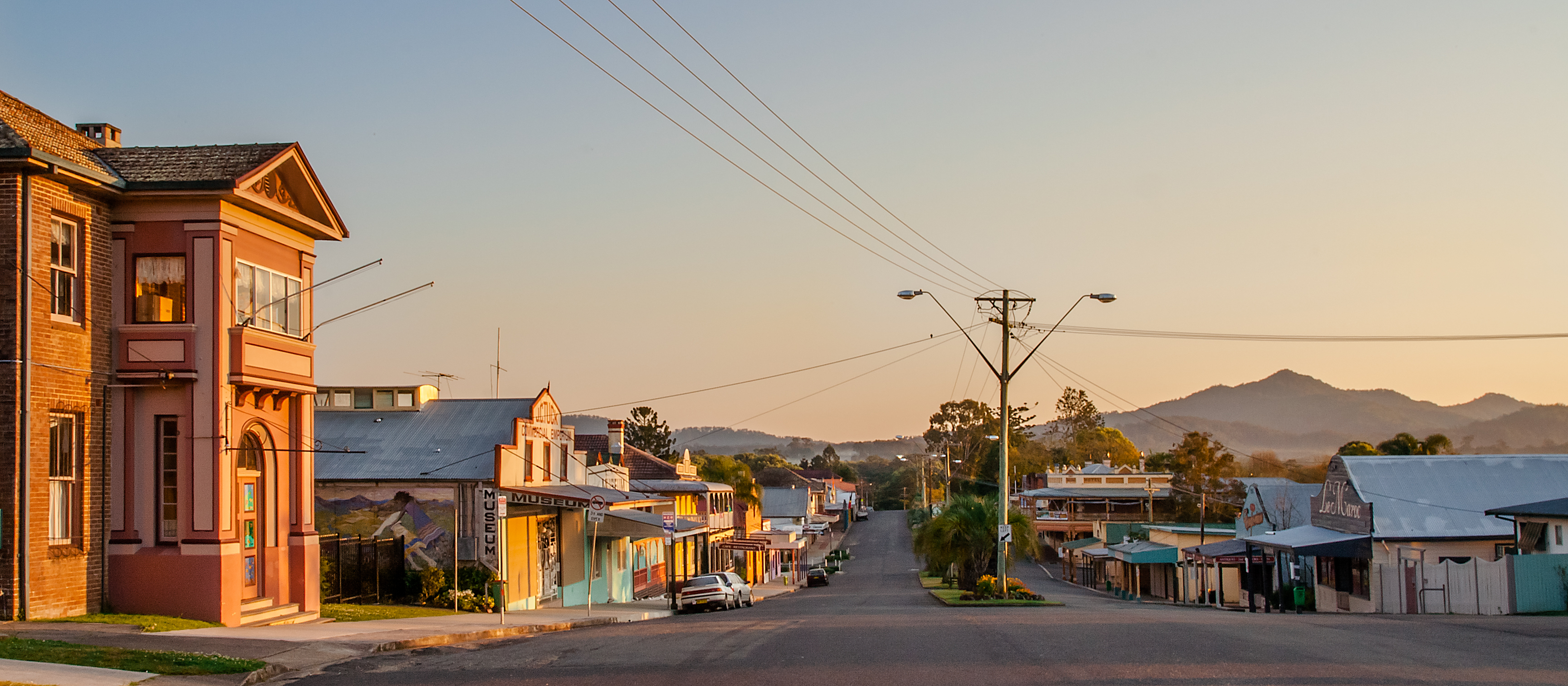
Bowraville, New South Wales

The Bowraville murders is the name given to a suspected case of serial murder, relating to three deaths that occurred over five months from September 1990 to February 1991 in Bowraville, New South Wales, Australia. All three victims were Aboriginal, and all disappeared after parties in Bowraville's Aboriginal community, in an area known as The Mission. The Mission is on Gumbayngirr Road, (formerly Cemetery Road) and is approximately 2 kilometres (1.2 mi) outside of the town centre. A local labourer, who was regarded by police as the prime suspect, was charged with two of the murders but was acquitted following trials in 1994 and 2006. On 13 September 2018, the New South Wales Court of Criminal Appeal decided that the man could not be retried for the murders. On 22 March 2019, the High Court of Australia refused an application by the Attorney General of New South Wales to bring an appeal against that decision.

== Victims ==
Locations
1 Colleen Walker last sighting, The Mission, Bowraville
2 Colleen Walker clothing Nambucca River
3 Evelyn Greenup last sighting
4 Evelyn Greenup skeletal remains found near Congarri Road
5 Clinton Speedy-Duroux last sighting, The Mission, Bowraville
6 Clinton Speedy-Duroux skeletal remains found near Congarri Road

=== Disappearance of Colleen Walker ===
The first victim, 16-year-old Colleen Walker of Sawtell, New South Wales, was in the rural timber town of Bowraville visiting relatives. She was last seen alive on 13 September 1990, walking away from a party in the Aboriginal community of The Mission. Thomas Jay Hart, a local man who later became the prime suspect, was noted to have been loitering around the party house. The following day, Walker's family reported to the police that she was missing. Despite the family believing something terrible had happened, the missing person's report was not taken seriously by local police; no search parties were formed and no formal action was taken. Walker's body has never been located, although in April 1991 articles of her clothing were later found weighed down by rocks in the Nambucca River.

=== Death of Evelyn Greenup ===
On 4 October 1990, Walker's cousin, four-year-old Evelyn Greenup, disappeared after a party at her grandmother's house. She was last seen by her mother's side after she was put to bed that night, but had vanished when she awoke the next morning. Evelyn's mother reported that she felt very tired and unwell that evening, and had gone into a deep sleep, waking up to find her clothes were removed. Greenup's grandmother later recalled hearing Evelyn briefly cry out during the night, but did not think much of it at the time. Several attendees recalled that the prime suspect was in attendance at this party, and had been awake late into the night. On 27 April 1991, Greenup's skeletal remains were found in bushland near Congarinni Road. An autopsy could not conclusively determine the cause of death, but noted that a skull injury was "consistent with a forceful penetration by a sharp instrument".

=== Death of Clinton Speedy-Duroux ===
On 31 January 1991, 16-year-old Clinton Speedy-Duroux went missing after a party at The Mission. Friends noted that Clinton appeared to be drunk that evening. This was noted as strange, as Clinton was not known to drink to intoxication. He was last seen on the morning of 1 February, and had stayed with his girlfriend in a yellow Viscount caravan used by the prime suspect. When his girlfriend awoke the next morning, Clinton was gone and some of her clothes had been removed. The prime suspect was outside, and stated that he had witnessed Clinton leave the caravan at 5am, but never returned. On 2 February 1991, Clinton's father, Thomas Duroux, reported his son missing to the local police, and a search was launched. On 18 February 1991, Speedy-Duroux's remains were discovered in bushland near Congarinni Road about seven kilometres outside Bowraville. A pillowcase from the prime suspect's caravan was located underneath his clothing.

== Initial police response ==
Colleen was the first of the Bowraville children to vanish, and so her case was treated in isolation by local police, who categorised her disappearance as a likely runaway. Colleen's family, however, rejected this view, insisting that something more serious had befallen her. Concerned for her safety, members of the local community, alongside Catholic priest Bernie Ryan, established an office where residents could come forward and document their memories of the night Colleen went missing. These statements were carefully transcribed and provided to police, to assist with the investigation.

Despite compelling evidence such as Colleen's intention to depart the following morning, her packed belongings, and her positive mood (all factors that could complicate the runaway theory) local authorities insisted that the majority of teenage disappearances are runaways, and Colleen would likely return home within two weeks. Colleen's family persisted in reporting her as missing, and encountered increased police scrutiny and accusations of child abuse in response. Research suggests that when reporting possible crimes or presenting as victims of crime, Aboriginal Australians commonly experience confrontational reactions, outright dismissal, and suspicion from police.

Members of Evelyn's family also encountered significant issues when reporting Evelyn missing, and police initially refused to take a statement or report the 4-year-old as missing. In a statement to the Standing Committee on Law and Justice, Evelyn's aunt stated, "... they just kept asking us where she was. They thought we had sent her up to Queensland. They just wouldn't listen to us when we said she had disappeared. I don't understand why they didn't believe us." Similarly to Colleen's family, Evelyn's mother was subjected to unfounded accusations when continuing to report her daughter missing,

"The Police kept telling me that my mother and I sold her and I was so disgusted in the thought of what they were saying this about me and my mother. My daughter was missing and it seemed like they just didn't want to find her."

Clinton's disappearance prompted a more immediate response from police compared to Colleen's and Evelyn's cases, with officers visiting the suspect's caravan later that day. By the time officers arrived, the bedding (sheets, pillow slips, and blankets) had been removed, and there was no visible sign of where Clinton had slept. The suspect was informally questioned at Macksville Police Station later that day, and on February 4, was formally interviewed about Clinton's disappearance. The caravan was officially searched on February 7, six days after Clinton had disappeared. This delay exemplifies a recurring criticism of the initial police investigations: police took too long to search pertinent locations and question key witnesses, risking the loss or contamination of potential evidence. At the time of Clinton's disappearance the police were treating each case as unrelated and possible runaways, and no formal connection was made between the three disappearances.

A crucial additional witness account, now referred to as the 'Norco Corner' evidence, further implicated possible foul play in Clinton's disappearance. On the early morning of February 1, two truck drivers were making early deliveries near Norco corner, roughly 200 metres from the caravan. They observed a white man standing over a barefoot Indigenous teenage boy beside a red car. When the truck drivers stopped and offered assistance, the man responded curtly, claiming he was trying to get the boy off the road and had already contacted police. Although this witness sighting was reported to law enforcement at the time, it was not pursued by the original investigative team and never reached the courts. It resurfaced only in 2006 through a renewed investigation, though by then its evidentiary value had diminished significantly due to the passage of time.

== Investigation ==
Police eventually agreed that the disappearances were likely criminal. However, they rejected the idea that the cases were directly linked and instead suspected the disappearances were a result of domestic child abuse, calling in the NSW Child Mistreatment Unit to investigate the community. Despite being under investigation, Bowraville's residents were sceptical of the police's claims and maintained their own search of the local area for their missing children.

After Clinton and Evelyn's bodies were found, the case officially became a homicide investigation. However, the investigation was not transferred to a homicide squad, and the Child Mistreatment Unit was ordered to continue on the case, despite having zero experience with homicide investigations. This decision has never been clearly explained, and is noted as a crucial mistake in the investigation. Several distinct similarities between the disappearances and murders led the local community and police to believe they were committed by the same person:

- All took place within the short time frame of five months.
- All three victims were Aboriginal.
- Autopsies of the two bodies that were found, indicate both suffered trauma to the head.
- All three victims disappeared after parties in the area locally known as "The Mish", a former Mission located on the outskirts of Bowraville.

Due to these similarities, investigators moved away from the initial 'child abuse' theory, to instead focus on a single prime suspect, Thomas Jay Hart, a 25-year-old, white, local labourer.

=== Trials ===
On 8 April 1991, a 25-year-old local Bowraville labourer, Thomas Jay Hart, was arrested for the murder of Speedy-Duroux. He was well known in the Aboriginal community in Bowraville and often attended the parties at The Mission. On 16 October 1991, while out on bail awaiting trial, Hart was arrested and charged with the murder of Greenup. Despite the prosecution intending to try the cases together, Justice Badgery-Parker ruled that the trials for Clinton and Evelyn's murders had to be held separately, as the law at the time restricted the use of coincidence (aka similar fact) evidence. This meant that evidence from one case could not be used in the other, posing a significant challenge for the prosecution and shaping the course of the Bowraville proceedings. With the cases separated, the prosecution had to present a much weaker circumstantial case. Hart was acquitted of Speedy-Duroux's murder by an NSW Supreme Court jury on 18 February 1994, the third anniversary of the discovery of his body. Significant concerns were later raised regarding how the jury interpreted Aboriginal witnesses. After the acquittal, prosecutors did not proceed with the trial against him for the murder of Greenup.

In 1997, the New South Wales Police Commissioner Peter Ryan set up "Task Force Ancud" to continue the investigation into the unsolved murders. On 9 February 2004, the NSW Coroner John Abernethy reopened the inquests into Greenup's death and the suspected death of Walker. On 10 September 2004, he recommended the man be charged afresh with Greenup's murder. As a result, he was charged again, this time for the murder of Greenup. The trial was conducted in February 2006. The prosecution produced two supposed confessions made by him, but he was acquitted on 3 March 2006.

=== Aftermath ===
The initial police response to the disappearances and murders, and the fact that no one has been convicted of the crimes, is a source of pain and bitterness for the Aboriginal community in Bowraville. After the acquittal in 2006, the NSW Police Minister raised the reward to $250,000 for information leading to the conviction of the persons responsible for the murders. The previous reward was $100,000, and it was only for information related to the disappearance of Walker.

In 2006, due to direct activism and campaigning by the children's families, changes were made to double jeopardy legislation in NSW opening the way for retrial of any person acquitted of a life-sentence offence if "fresh and compelling evidence" was uncovered. In October 2011, Walker's family found bones in bushland near Macksville, New South Wales, but forensic testing indicated that they were animal remains.

=== Application for a retrial ===
In 2016, the detective inspector leading the investigation made a submission to the NSW Attorney General calling for a retrial based on new evidence. In the same month, the suspect said that he was not necessarily opposed to a retrial. In May there was a protest march by the families of the victims and their supporters calling for legislative change to the NSW Parliament building.

On 9 February 2017, police laid a murder charge against the suspect, and the NSW Attorney General applied to the Court of Criminal Appeal for a retrial. The Attorney General's application was heard by the Court of Criminal Appeal beginning on 29 November 2017. The Attorney General needed to identify "fresh and compelling" evidence in order to have the man's acquittals quashed and to obtain an order for a retrial. On 13 September 2018, the court dismissed the application, concluding that none of the evidence was "fresh and compelling" and that he therefore could not be retried for the murders. The court concluded that most of the evidence relied upon was not "fresh", because it was available to be tendered or brought forward prior to the earlier trial of the man for the murder of Greenup.

On 22 March 2019, the High Court of Australia refused an application by the Attorney General for special leave to appeal against the decision of the Court of Criminal Appeal, concluding that there was no reason to doubt the correctness of that decision. The campaign for a retrial continues.

== Media ==
The Bowraville Murders have been covered by an episode of Four Corners, "Unfinished Business" and occasional segments on Australian current affairs shows such as Australian Story and 60 Minutes. In 2013, the families of the victims worked with Eualeyai/Kamillaroi filmmaker Larissa Behrendt on Innocence Betrayed, a documentary film detailing the experience of the Aboriginal families and communities pursuing justice. The film was shortlisted for both a Walkley Award and an Australian Human Rights Award in 2014 and won a UTS Human Right Award.

Since the release of Innocence Betrayed and the increased popularity of true crime podcasting, the case has received increased media attention. Dan Box, a crime reporter with The Australian, hosted a five-part Australian crime podcast that detailed the murders, released in May 2016, called Bowraville. Box also released a book of the same name in July 2019. The case was also featured in an episode of the true crime podcast Casefile. In 2021, a new documentary film directed by Stefan Moore and Dan Goldberg, The Bowraville Murders, was released. The documentary film won an award at the Sydney Film Festival that same year.

== Legal and scholarly significance ==
The Bowraville murders have attained a broad significance in contemporary Australian criminal justice. Scholars consider the legal response to the Bowraville murders as highlighting major questions around justice for Indigenous Australians, the importance of cultural competency in police investigations and courtrooms, and the implications of double jeopardy law reforms in NSW. These issues, while central to the Bowraville case, are likely to affect homicide cases across Australia more widely. Scholars have emphasised that the Bowraville families' campaign to amend Double Jeopardy, including marches, petitions, and a Tent Embassy on NSW Parliament Lawn, constitutes "grassroots transitional justice," challenging state reluctance to revisit prosecutorial failures.

Academic lawyers have used Bowraville as a case study in critiquing the restrictive "fresh and compelling" test under the Crimes (Appeal & Review) Act 2001 (NSW). They have argued that the Act's narrow construction of "freshness" (requiring that evidence not be reasonably discoverable at the first trial), fails to account for systemic investigative deficits that disproportionately affect Indigenous victims. Scholars further contend that post-2006 double-jeopardy amendments, while progressive in theory, offer illusory relief when courts retain traditional deference to jury verdict finality. While some operational reforms followed government inquiries into the case, e.g. culturally informed witness protocols, key legal reforms regarding admissibility of tendency evidence and double jeopardy remain ultimately unrealised.

In relation to media studies, scholars have placed Dan Box's podcast Bowraville alongside the podcast Phoebe's Fall, highlighting their genre conventions (chronological structure, investigator-narrator voice) and their greater access to primary participants. These analyses conclude that audio storytelling can pressure institutions, though risk re-traumatising families when ethical safeguards are weak.

== See also ==
- List of fugitives from justice who disappeared
- List of unsolved murders (1980–1999)
- Lois Roberts
- Murder of Jaidyn Leskie
- Lists of people who disappeared
- List of Australian crime podcasts
