= The Cake Man =

1975 Australian play

The Cake Man is a 1975 play by Aboriginal Australian writer Bob Merritt, notable for being the first play written by an Indigenous Australian person to be published, televised and to tour out of Australia. A telemovie was made of a 1977 performance of the play. The Aboriginal Theatre Company was formed by Bob Merritt and Brian Syron especially to produce the play for a tour to the United States in 1982.

== Background ==
The Cake Man was written by Merritt while an inmate at Bathurst Gaol, having been jailed for a minor offence. He was assisted by Jim McNeil.

== Synopsis ==
The play opens with a tableau showing a missionary in the early days of white settlement in Australia giving an Aboriginal woman a Bible after her husband has just been shot by a British soldier. It goes on to tell the story of Sweet William, a sad Aboriginal man living in contemporary Sydney with his wife Ruby, still practising Christianity, and children. Sweet William has lost both self-respect and his 11-year-old son Pumpkinhead's respect.

The story is partly drawn from Merritt's experience of growing up on Erambie Mission in Cowra, New South Wales. The eponymous Cake Man is a character who is sent with gifts of love by Jesus for Aboriginal children, but has been blinded by a villain so that he can only see white children on his wanderings in the bush. Bible stories are mixed with mythology, as the Cake Man represents the hope of Christian love held by Ruby. The story tells of a family struggling to survive on a mission.

== Style and tone ==
The coordinator of a course in Aboriginal theatre at the Western Australian Academy of Performing Arts wrote in a masters thesis (2010):

It moves in time and space between the pre-invasion and protection eras, the "two realities" referred to by Sweet William in the Epilogue. Characters step out of naturalism and directly address the audience. Songs and dreamtime stories are used to express the "two realities". Although the pre-invasion era is idealised in Act One, and the harshness of mission life presented in detail, the tone of The Cake Man is hopeful rather than bitter.

== Performances ==
=== 1975–1982 ===
The Cake Man was the first full-length play staged by the National Black Theatre, with its first run of performances taking place at the Black Theatre Arts and Culture Centre in Redfern, Sydney on 12 January 1975, directed by Bob Maza, and with Zac Martin playing Sweet William and Justine Saunders as Ruby. Merritt, escorted by prison guards, attended the opening night in handcuffs. The actors refused to commence the performance until Merritt's handcuffs were removed.

In 1977 a production directed by George Ogilvie was performed at the Bondi Pavilion Theatre in 1977, making it the first play by an Indigenous Australian playwright presented by professional actors at a mainstream Australian venue. Brian Syron took the role of Sweet William, in his first performance in 10 years. On opening night, on 29 April 1977, there were equal numbers of black and white people in the audience, which included Mum Shirl, founder of the Aboriginal Medical Service, and Paul Coe, both former residents of Erambie, as well as Merritt's mother and brothers. Both gave speeches in which they expressed the meaning of the play to them, and Coe, then president of the Aboriginal Legal Service, said "This play means more to me than my life". After playing for six weeks in Sydney, it toured other states, and was invited to the Negro Ensemble Company's theatre in New York City. The production, in which Syron again played Sweet William and Justine Saunders played Ruby, was filmed by ABC Television.

In early July 1982 The Cake Man played at the Parade Theatre in Kensington, as a warm-up run before touring to the United States. Syron said at the time that the play was "about dispossessed people everywhere". Later than month, The Cake Man was performed at the World Theatre Festival in Denver, Colorado, with Justine Saunders as Ruby, in a role which she later said was one of her favourite roles. The tour was eventually funded mostly by the Aboriginal Arts Board of the Australia Council, the Australian Elizabethan Theatre Trust (AETT), the New South Wales Government, Department of Foreign Affairs, and CBC Bank (later National Australia Bank). Syron and Merritt had formed the Aboriginal Theatre Company in order to produce the play, and had approached the AETT first. The AETT sent out 140 letters requesting a donation of $500 to help fund the play, with only CBC responding, and the total amount raised was still not enough, so Syron raised a second mortgage on his own home to top it up. There were invitations to perform it elsewhere and to televise or film it in the United States, and Syron had hoped to put it on stage at the Kennedy Center in Washington, DC.

In October 1982, it was staged at the Edward Street Theatre in Brisbane, with Brian Syron and Justine Saunders in the main roles.

=== 21st century ===
In 2012, a play-reading was performed by Moogahlin Performing Arts, presented by the Sydney Festival and Carriageworks in association with the Australian Broadcasting Corporation, and on 16 January 2015 Moogahlin did a reprise at Eora College (which was founded by Merritt) in Redfern to mark the 40th anniversary of the play.

The play was notably revived for performances in Sydney and Perth in Belvoir and Yirra Yaakin co-production in 2013, with Luke Carroll and Irma Woods as Sweet William and Ruby. George Shevtsov, who was in the original production of the play, while Kyle Morrison directed the new version. The Perth performance was the first time it had been staged in Western Australia.

== Reception and significance ==
The Cake Man was highly successful during its Australian runs, and was met with standing ovations at its 1982 performance in Denver.

Julian Meyrick, Professor of Creative Arts at Flinders University, described it as being "about the mission experience for Indigenous Australians, and the indignity, injustice and often outright exploitation that came from being 'protected' by white Australians with little knowledge and less interest in the traditional culture their arrival had near-fatally disrupted", and the style as "a beautifully nuanced realism".

It was the first play written by an Indigenous Australian person to be presented by professional actors at a mainstream Australian venue, published, televised and to tour out of Australia, having toured abroad in 1982.

== Film ==
The Cake Man was restructured and shortened to make it into a film for television by ABC Television, directed by Douglas Sharp, and a copy is held at the National Archives of Australia AIATSIS, and the University of Queensland library. Merritt co-produced the film, along with Sharp and two others, with Brian Syron and Justine Saunders as Sweet William and Ruby. Its release date is cited as 9 October 1977. Other actors appearing include Teddy Phillips (Pumpkinhead), Graham Rouse, Neil Fitzpatrick and Hugh Keays-Byrne.

This was first television production of a play by an Aboriginal playwright in Australia.
