= First in Line (TV show) =

Australian current affairs television show (1989)

First in Line is an Australian current affairs program that aired on SBS that covered subjects primarily in the interests of Australia's indigenous community. It was the first primetime program focused on Aboriginal people and was created by Aboriginies and Torres Strait Islanders. It was presented by Rhoda Roberts and Michael Johnson and debuted in April 1989. Originally scheduled for 13 episodes it ran for 27 episodes over two seasons plus 5 documentary specials.
