= Festival of the Dreaming =

Indigenous Australian arts festival

Festival of the Dreaming, later The Dreaming: Australia's International Indigenous Festival, was an Indigenous arts and culture festival in Australia. It was held from 1997 until 2005 in Sydney, New South Wales, and then in Woodford, Queensland, until it was incorporated into the Woodford Folk Festival around 2012.

== History ==
The inaugural Festival of the Dreaming was first held in 1997. The name refers to the Aboriginal Australian concept of The Dreaming. The first edition of the festival, which was founded by artistic director Rhoda Roberts, was the first of four leading up to the 2000 Summer Olympics in Sydney, with some events held at the Sydney Opera House. It included an Aboriginal cast performing Shakespeare's A Midsummer Night's Dream, as well as Samuel Beckett's Waiting for Godot performed in the Bundjalung language. Lydia Miller was project head for the inaugural festival.

The festival took place in Sydney until 2004, when it relocated to Woodford, Queensland. Roberts was artistic director of the festival until 2009.

The festival was first held at Woodford on 10 to 13 June 2005, billed as "The Dreaming: Australia's International Indigenous Festival". It was held annually until it was incorporated into the Woodford Folk Festival in 2011–2012.
