= Couldn't Be Fairer =

- Directed by: Dennis O'Rourke
- Written by: Mick Miller
- Produced by: Dennis O'Rourke
- Cinematography: Dennis O'Rourke
- Edited by: Tim Litchfield, Ruth Cullen
- Release date: 1984
- Running time: 50 minutes
- Country: Australia

Couldn't Be Fairer is a 1984 Australian documentary film directed by Dennis O'Rourke and narrated by Aboriginal activist Mick Miller, which paints a disturbing portrait of Indigenous life in Queensland. The title of the film references a 1983 statement about Aboriginal Australians made by Joh Bjelke-Petersen, the Premier of Queensland at the time: "We treat them the same as everyone else – couldn't be fairer."

== Synopsis ==
Couldn't Be Fairer reveals how Australia's first people are still suffering from social oppression, with many living on reservations where alcoholism is rampant and unemployment the major occupation. Aboriginal land rights are a central theme: Miller clearly demonstrates the contrast between the attitudes of European Australians, who see the land only as a resource to be mined, farmed, grazed and built upon, and Aboriginal Australians, who regard the land as sacred. Archival footage compares the original lifestyle of Aboriginal Australians to their current pitiful condition, and shows how European settlers attempted to "civilize" mixed blood children by taking them away from their parents and enrolling them in boarding schools.

The film ends on an optimistic note, with Miller introducing the audience to a cattle station in northern Queensland called Delta Downs Station, which is owned and successfully run by Aboriginal Australians. Miller asserts that if the government would give sovereignty of the land and reserves back to the Aboriginal people, they would be able to show the world what they are capable of achieving.

Mick Miller died in 1998.

== Production ==
Noting the importance of a documentary about Aboriginal Australian rights in Queensland, Mick Miller stated that:

A film had to be made to show that in the little outback towns, nothing has really changed. Blacks are still being bashed and arrested for minor offences and it’s very difficult to lay charges against those responsible. We wanted to show that, in Queensland, Blacks are still being treated the way they were 30 years ago, and that in some of the pubs in the little towns there are still separate bars for Blacks and whites. We Blacks still aren’t allowed to drink with the local ringers and land owners.

— Mick Miller, Tribune.

== Reviews ==
Robert Milliken, of the National Times (Sydney) wrote:

Couldn't Be Fairer is a devastating account of the Aboriginal land rights battle in Queensland. It reveals white Australians at their most beer-sodden and hypocritical. O'Rourke has captured scenes showing how racism and vulgarity which the middle class of Sydney and Melbourne like to think died with the 1950s are alive and thriving in the Australian heartland.
With unflinching honesty, it depicts the problems of alcoholism, racial violence and political oppression still faced today by the first Australians. Using astutely selected archival footage to give historical depth to scenes of contemporary desolation and abuse, the film is a hard-hitting statement about racial conflict. ... [It] is also a profile of aboriginal activist Mick Miller, who ... narrates the film and forcefully expresses his view of race relations in Australia.
