= Brian Syron =

Indigenous Australian film director

- Born: 19 November 1934; Balmain, New South Wales, Australia
- Died: 14 October 1993 (aged 58); Sydney, New South Wales
- Occupations: actor, director, teacher, advocate, producer
- Years active: 1950s-1993

Brian Gregory Syron (19 November 1934 – 14 October 1993) was an actor, teacher, Aboriginal rights activist, stage director and Australia's first Indigenous feature film director; who has also been recognised as the first First Nations feature film director. After studying in New York City under Stella Adler, he returned to Australia and was a co-founder of the Australian National Playwrights Conference, the National Black Playwrights Conference, and the Aboriginal National Theatre Trust. He worked on several television productions and was appointed head of the ABC's new Aboriginal unit in 1988.

== Life ==
Brian Syron was born on 19 November 1934 in the inner Sydney suburb of Balmain. His mother, Elizabeth Murray, was from Newcastle-upon-Tyne, England, and his father, Daniel Syron, a general labourer, was a Birrippi-Worimi Aboriginal man. Brian was one of eight children.

Syron also spent half of his childhood living with his paternal Birripi-Worimi grandmother, Susie Syron, in his ancestral Worimi lands at Minimbah, New South Wales, 11 km (6.8 mi) up the Coolongolook River from Forster. Minimbah means "home of the teacher" in the Birrippi-Worimi shared language of Gathang. His traditional country encompassed Taree, Forster and the Great Lakes area of the Wang Wauk and Coolonglook rivers on the North Coast. His paternal Dreaming was the eagle, although he described himself as a magpie – half black, half white. He was also exposed to Aboriginal reserve life at Purfleet and Forster through the 1930s and early 1940s, and spent time as a 14- and 15-year-old in Grafton Correctional Centre. Even with this background, Syron told the Human Rights and Equal Opportunity Commission (HREOC) on 15 November 1992:

I have no mortgage on being dispossessed or having a tough life. We've all had it. Every Aboriginal person I know of in my generation has had one hell of a time. Nobody has a mortgage on that. We've all been through it. Our obligation, our mandate, as artists is to communicate with our people first.{Syron, HREOC, 15.11.92}

Brian Syron died of leukaemia on 14 October 1993 in Sydney and was buried in Botany Cemetery in Matraville.

== Theatre ==
Syron did not identify as Aboriginal through the 1950s and 1960s. He moved to King's Cross in Sydney, and began his artistic career in 1960 at the Ensemble Theatre in Kirribilli, Sydney under the guidance of New York-trained American actor/director and esteemed teacher of the Strasberg Method, the late Hayes Gordon.

=== New York and London ===
Syron decided to go to the United States because he was unhappy with the English style of acting being taught in Australia. He was forced to deny that he was Aboriginal in order to obtain an Australian passport. This was because Indigenous Australians were not allowed to have passports. Syron left Australia in 1961 to work in Europe as a fashion model with Dior, Cardin and Balenciaga. In 1961, he moved to New York City, living initially on Fifth Avenue with one of Australia's first "supermodels", Pauline Kiernan. He was accepted as a student with the Stella Adler Studio, where he studied with fellow students Robert De Niro, Warren Beatty and Peter Bogdanovich, and became a teacher himself.

Completing his American training, he spent 12 months in Britain studying with Cicily Berry as well as Doreen Cannon, head of acting, at the Royal Academy of Dramatic Art before returning to New York. There, he co-founded a theatre company based around the Caffè Lena in Saratoga Springs in 1966, upstate New York while touring as a director with the Boston Herald-Traveler's Shakespeare Company and doing stints as a teacher for Adler's studio. Syron then returned to New York, where he worked as an actor on various American Shakespeare festivals and with the La MaMa Experimental Theatre Club and The New Theatre, and also toured through the southern states.

=== Return to Australia ===
Syron returned to Australia, in 1968, following the 1967 referendum. He moved first to Perth, where he directed at Aarne Neeme's The Playhouse, for a short time, before being invited to return to Sydney and direct Fortune and Men's Eyes at his old alma mater the Ensemble. For this he received the inaugural Drama Critics' Award for Best Production and his leading man Max Phipps received Best Actor for his role of "Queenie". He began teaching master classes to in the Stella Adler method to Aboriginal students.

Syron was invited to join Sydney's Old Tote Theatre by Robert Quentin, Head of Drama at the University of New South Wales, and Robin Lovejoy, Artistic Director. He was the first Indigenous Australian to work as a director in the mainstream Australian theatre industry and in 1972 was appointed Theatre Consultant for the Aboriginal Arts Board of the inaugural Australia Council for the Arts, headed for the first time by an Indigenous person, the artist Wandjuk Marika.

=== Australian National Playwrights Conference ===
The following year, 1973, Syron co-founded the Australian National Playwrights Conference (ANPC) with Katharine Brisbane, which continued to take place annually until at least 2006. Lloyd Richards, then head of acting at Yale University and artistic director of the American National Playwrights Conference wrote to the Aboriginal Arts Board of the Australia Council in September 1993:

The National Playwrights Conference of Australia exists because Brian Syron visited the National Playwrights Conference in Waterford, Conn. and recognised it as an important idea for Australia, and he went back to champion the possibility. Others visited and the rest is history." {Lloyd G. Richards, 9.5.1993}

Syron returned to the theatre again in 1976 with his direction of Dimboola (written by Jack Hibberd) in Newcastle as well as at Bonapartes Theatre Restaurant, Kings Cross, Sydney, where his stage production ran continuously for the next two years and four months. He followed "Dimboola" with a production of the American play Falling Apart by Monte Merrick at the New Theatre, Newtown, Sydney, and in 1978 he played the role of "The Actor" in a production of Maxim Gorky's The Lower Depths which ran for six weeks at the Sydney Opera House. In this same year, he opened the New Group Theatre at the All Nations Club, Kings Cross, where he directed among other productions A Tribute to Tennessee Williams, before the ongoing costs of keeping an independent theatre going forced Syron to close after 12 months.

=== Aboriginal Theatre Company ===
He co-founded the Aboriginal Theatre Company (ATC) in 1981 with scriptwriter/playwright/director Bob Merritt in order to tour Merritt's play The Cake Man, under Syron's direction, to the 1982 World Theatre Festival in Denver, Colorado, where the play received a tremendous audience response. Following this success, the play then toured various colleges around the United States. The Cake Man was performed at the World Theatre Festival in Denver, Colorado, Returning to Australia, Syron directed a season of The Cake Man at the Universal Theatre in Fitzroy, Melbourne after which it was funded by Australian federal government's Ministry of Aboriginal Affairs to play at the 1983 Warana – Commonwealth Arts Festival, Brisbane in Queensland where it was performed at the Edward Street Theatre.

In 1986, Syron, on behalf of the Aboriginal Arts Board, published a "Questionnaire seeking support for establishment of National Aboriginal Theatre Company", ahead of a National Black Playwrights Workshop at James Cook University in Townsville.

=== National Black Playwrights Conference ===
In January 1987, Syron founded the National Black Playwrights Conference (NPBC), which was held at the Australian National University, Canberra. In an interview with Angela Bennie, Australia's leading Indigenous actress Justine Saunders commented :

It was Brian Syron, in fact, who was the instigator not only of the first National Black Playwrights Conference but the National Playwrights Conference. Syron always said our culture is an oral one, it comes through our painting, through our singing, through our stories that's how we pass down our laws, that's how we have passed down our history for 60,000 years

Eva Johnson was writer/director of the conference. During the conference, the delegates awarded Syron the 1987 inaugural Harold Blair Award for his Lifetime Achievements in the Performing Arts, which brought with it the additional honour of the title "Elder".

=== ANTT ===
As a result of the first NBPC, Syron, as a member of a steering committee which included Rhoda Roberts, Kevin Gilbert, Lydia Miller, Michael Johnson (who presented two SBS Television series in 1989 and 1991), Suzanne Butt, and Lesley Fogarty, with Justine Saunders as adviser, proposed and co-founded the Aboriginal National Theatre Trust (ANTT).

ANTT was constituted as a limited company in May 1988, and was staffed by Aboriginal artists who were committed to the promotion and protection of all Aboriginal arts. It founded a National Aboriginal Theatre, and provided advice to a number of Aboriginal and non-Indigenous production companies, theatre companies and educational institutions, and individuals.

In May 1988 ANTT staged The Keepers, by Bob Maza, at the Belvoir Street Theatre, which was the first all-Aboriginal production staged in Australia.

The Second National Black Playwrights Conference was held in 1989 at Macquarie University, which gave rise to the Corroboree of Aboriginal National Storytellers.

In March 1990 ANTT staged the world premiere of Munjong, by Richard Walley and directed by Vivian Walker (son of Oodgeroo Noonuccal), at the Victorian Arts Centre. The actor David Field (brother of Rhoda Roberts' partner Steve Field) played a violent husband of Roberts' character, a woman who doesn't know that she's Aboriginal. Roberts later related a story about an elderly Aboriginal woman, who had never been in a theatre before and was sitting in the front row, who got up to help protect the actress from the husband's blows. Roberts said: "That was when I realised we'd really made a point. Aboriginal people were seeing art that mirrored their lives".

In June 1991, after its board of directors in protest against the lack of financial support from government, the ANTT ceased operations.

=== Last work ===
Syron carried out a two-week workshop, a stage reading, plus a production in 1991 at the Belvoir Street Theatre, Redfern, Sydney of Mudrooroo Narogin's "courageous and brave new play" The Aboriginal Demonstrators Confront the Declaration of the Australian Republic on 26 January 2001 with the Production of "Der Auftrag" by Heiner Muller and starring Justine Saunders, Michael Watson, David Kennedy, Pamela Young, Ray Kelly and Graham Cooper. The play and the production are also the subject of Mudrooroo Narogin's book The Mudrooroo/Muller Project – A Theatrical Casebook, with a chapter by Syron and edited by Gerhard Fischer in collaboration with leading Indigenous academic Paul Behrendt and Syron. Syron was too ill to do more than direct the stage reading of the play.

== Teaching ==
Following the success of "Fortune", Syron was approached by Sydney drama professionals to set up the Actors Master Class for those interested in studying the Stanislavski/Adler technique and for which Syron had applied to his award-winning production. Following the success of the Master Class, Syron was requested to introduce an Intermediate classes and then a Beginners class, both of limited numbers. The School was kept open on an ad hoc basis over the next 23 years and moved many times between 1969 and 1992.

In 1969 Syron taught the first group of urban Aboriginal actors to every study Stanislavski or acting from an Indigenous perspective. The classes were held at the Foundation of Aboriginal Affairs, George Street (near Central railway station), Sydney CBD and the actors included political and cultural historian/actor Denis Walker and actor/director/historian Gary Foley. The situation was still so bad that at the end of each evening the actors had to be ferried back by taxi to their homes in Redfern, about 10 minutes' walk away, to avoid arrest by the police.

He followed this in the early 1972 with workshops and acting classes held at the Black Theatre Arts & Cultural Centre (aka Black Theatre), Cope Street, Redfern where his pupils included Jack Davis, Hyllus Maris, Lester Bostock, Maureen Watson and Gerry Bostock.

In 1973, as a foundation member of the Peter Summerton Foundation, Syron organised with his mentor Stella Adler to travel to Australia and conduct a series of master classes for people from all areas of the Australian entertainment industries. He then instigated The Artists' Group Theatre, with the first workshops being held in the sculpture studio of Ron Robertson-Swann before moving to The Stables, Kings Cross. During this year he was invited to teach drama to The Resurgent Society inmates of Parramatta Gaol, and became involved with the Society for the next 12 months. His group included playwrights Jim McNeil and Robin Thurston, and Syron is believed to be the first drama teacher to work in the prison system of New South Wales.

At the end of 1974 Syron went to Los Angeles to take up a Adler's invitation to work at the Stella Adler Los Angeles Acting Studio on Hollywood Boulevard.

Leading Indigenous academic and Harvard University graduate Roberta Sykes set up the Black Women's Action (BWA) group in 1976 with Syron as a foundation member, joining other Indigenous and non-Indigenous Australians in the support of the educational advancement of Indigenous women in their pursuit of academic success at leading international universities.

Over the period 1986–1987 Syron became the first Indigenous Australian to lecture at the Australian Film, Television and Radio School (AFTRS). In Australia's Bi-Centennial Year, 1988, Syron, as representative of actors and the Aboriginal National Theatre Trust, was invited back to AFTRS as a guest lecturer for the "Writing '88" Course.

== Television ==
Syron was employed as children's dialogue coach on ABC Television's award-winning television production Seven Little Australians (1974), a series adapted from the Ethel Turner novel of the same name. In 1976 Syron was cast as Sweet William in the television adaptation of the Robert Merritt play The Cake Man (1977). Almost immediately after this production Syron was cast as Ray in "Ray's Story" a one-hour episode of Pig in a Poke (1977) a five-part series screened on ABC TV starring Justine Saunders, Athol Compton, Gary Foley and Paul Coe, and described as the first modern urban Aboriginal drama screened on Australian television. Syron then played the leading role of "The Wife Abuser" in director Stephen Wallace's telemovie Women Who Kill (1983) which screened on ATN Channel 9.

In 1987 Syron was executive producer of the documentary-drama film production Karbara: First Born (1987), directed and produced by Richard Guthrie, during and following the 1987 Australian National Playwrights Conference. The film featured Lydia Miller and Ernie Dingo and screened at the Sydney Film Festival in 1987 and on ABC TV.

In 1988 he was appointed head of the ABC's new Aboriginal unit. Syron and Saunders were co-presenters of the ABC TV Aboriginal entertainment series The First Australians (1988–1990). This series of 18 × 1-hour programs featured leading Aboriginal people in the fields of performance, music and art, and presented Indigenous Australian political and commercial leaders in discussions on various topics important to Indigenous Australians.

== Film ==
In 1970 Syron left Australia for the USA where he took up a position as Attachment / Assistant on the feature film What's Up Doc? directed by Peter Bogdanovich. Syron's next film project was the short film Jeremy and Teapot (1976) starring Patrick Thompson as Jeremy and Syron as Teapot with the Narrator Jack Thompson, shot on location at Thompson's property at Upper Bo Bo, via Ulong, northern New South Wales. The film went on to win Best Film, 1982 Women's International Film/Video Festival, Tucson, Arizona, USA.

Syron was employed on director Peter Weir's feature film The Last Wave (1977) as a consultant.

The Australian Film Commission awarded Syron a grant in 1980 for his script Australian Aboriginal Achievers (1980), which was a biographical documentary recounting the achievements of seven leading Aboriginal achievers: actor/historian Gary Foley, potter Thancoupie, artist Jean Jimmi, bureaucrat Charles Perkins, academic Miriam Rose Ungunmeer-Bauman and artists Jimmy Bienderry and Stumpy Martin Jempijimpa. The script never received production funding and was later used as the basis for the Clare Dunn book People Under the Skin – An Irish Immigrant's Experience of Aboriginal Australia.

In 1981, Syron played a small role of "The Neighbour" in The City's Edge (1983) (aka Running Man Edge of the City)", co-written by Robert Merritt the first Australian Indigenous scriptwriter of a feature film and the Nightclub Manager in Coolangatta Gold (1983).

Backlash (1986) directed and produced by Bill Bennett featured Lydia Miller with Syron in the role of The Executioner or Kadachi Man. Syron and the lead actors were the co-writers of this production although they were uncredited by Bennett. The script improvisation by the actors is confirmed by Encore

"Bill Bennett's "Backlash", for instance, is a film for which the principals improvised their dialogue...in this his latest effort he tested this technique to its limit" (Encore, 24 April – 7 May 1986 : 6)

Syron and Rosalie Kunoth-Monks were employed as Co-Aboriginal Consultants on the television production Naked Under Capricorn (1989) directed by Rob Stewart, produced by Syron's brother-in-law Ray Alchin and starring Nigel Havers.

From 1990 to 1992 Syron directed the first feature film by an Indigenous Australian, Jindalee Lady (1992), and he is recognised as being the first First Nations director of a feature film. Nearly all cast and crew were also Aboriginal, and one scene featured the Bangarra Dance Theatre. Lowitja O'Donoghue, Chair of the Aboriginal and Torres Strait Islander Commission wrote saying

Mr Syron is held in high esteem by both indigenous and non-indigenous Australians for his work as our first indigenous feature film director..He has made a valuable contribution to indigenous art in this country and has been a strong and articulate advocate in the movement to raise and promote the status of indigenous theatre and film as an integral part of Australia's cultural heritage" (O'Donoghue, letter to Russell Mulvey, Edmonton, Canada, 8.12.1992)

Briann Kearney and Syron applied in a joint application for a Literary Fellowship from the Australia Council and were awarded $20,000 to co-write Kicking Down the Doors – a History of Indigenous Filmmaking from 1968–1993 including non-Indigenous films for and about Indigenous people, based on research collected by Syron for his submission to the 1992 HREOC submission.

== Founder / member ==
- Black Theatre Arts & Cultural Centre (1972) – artistic director / foundation member
- Bondi Pavilion Theatre (1973) – co-founder / artistic director
- Peter Summerton Foundation (1969) – foundation member / organiser "Stella Adler Master Classes" (1973)
- The Artists' Group Theatre (1973) – foundation member
- The Australian National Playwrights Conference (1973) – co-founder
- The New Group Theatre(1978) – founder
- The Aboriginal Theatre Company (1981) – co-founder
- Black Women's Action Group (1985) – foundation member / honorary secretary
- The Australian Black Playwrights Conference (1987) – founder
- The Aboriginal National Theatre Trust (1987) – co-founder / co-director

== Recognition ==
- 1969 Winner, Inaugural Drama Critics Award – Best Production, Fortune and Men's Eyes
- 1970 Polish Government Scholarship to study with Jerzy Grotowski in Wrocław ($10,000)
- 1978 Script development grant, Australian Film Commission, "Cape Hawk – A Work in Progress"
- 1978 Department of Aboriginal Affairs, Aboriginal Overseas Study Grant
- 1978 BBC TV Specials Directors' Course for Emerging Nations
- 1987 Winner, inaugural Harold Blair Award for Lifetime Achievement in the Performing Arts
- 1987 Awarded the title of "Elder" by BNPC Delegates
- 1990 Ikkeman Sacred Feather, International First Nations Film and Art Festival, Canada
- 1992 Best Feature Film and first feature film by a First Nations Director, Dreamspeaker International Film and Arts Festival, Edmonton, Alberta, Canada
- 1992 Nominee, East West Award – Best Feature Film, Hawaii International Film Festival, Hawaii, USA
- 1993 Co-recipient, Literary Fellowship – Australia Council, for "Kicking Down the Doors: A History of Australian Indigenous Filmmakers: 1968 to 1993"

== Selected publications ==
- Entertainment Arts in Australia, 1968, Ed. John Allen, Paul Hamlyn, Dee Why, Australia, 81:82
- People Under the Skin – An Irish Immigrant's Experience of Aboriginal Australia, Clare Dunne, Lotus Publishing House, Carlingford, Australia. 1988 : vi:viii + ISBN 1-86305-000-0
- Aboriginal Voices – Contemporary Aboriginal Artists, Writers and Performers 1990, 138:142, Liz Thompson, Simon & Schuster, Brookvale, Australia, ISBN 1-55643-131-7
- Voices of the First Day – Awakening in the Aboriginal Dreamtime, 1991, 1 : 5, Robert Lawlor, Inner Traditions International, Vermont, USA, ISBN 0-89281-355-5
- Interview – 23 June 1993 – Brian Syron with Trevor Ellis, National Films Canberra, ACT, Australia – 16 mm – Last Interview
- "Screening the Past : The Sixth Australian History & Film Conference Papers – Aboriginal Cultural Identity", 1993, 54 : 58, Media Centre, La Trobe University, Bundoora, Melbourne, Australia, ISBN 0-642-22138-3
- Kicking Down the Doors – A History of Indigenous Filmmakers from 1968-1993, 1996, with co-author Briann Kearney, Donobri International, Hawaii/Sydney, ISBN 0-646-26594-6 (2nd Edition 2007. Lulu Inc. ISBN 978-1-84799-364-9)
- Mudrooroo/Mueller Project – A Theatrical Casebook, Edited by Gerhard Fisher, Paul Behrendt, 1993, New South Wales University Press, Kensington, Australia, ISBN 0-86840-237-0
- Media Ethics, an Aboriginal Film and the Australian Film Commission, 2002, Thomas G. Donovan, Brody T. Lorraine, Universe, Lincoln, U.S.A., ISBN 0-595-25266-4

=== Papers ===
- "The Population Future of Indigenous Peoples", 1983 United Nations Working Group on Indigenous Populations, Representative of the Aboriginal Arts Board of Australia Council, Bucharest Romania
- "Colonialism, Loss of Land & Our Legal Rights", 1988 Fifth Festival of Pacific Arts, Representative of the Aboriginal National Theatre Trust, Townsville, North Queensland, Australia
- "Indigenous Feature Filmmaking", 1991 World Festival of Indigenous Motion Pictures, Pincher Creek, Canada
- "Indigenous Fimmaking in Australia". 1991 AFC Film Funding Policy Conference, Institute of Cultural Policy, Griffith University, Brisbane, Qld. Australia.
- 1992 Human Rights & Equal Right Commission submission dealing with Australian Film Commission's denial of Equal opportunity in the Australian feature film industry.
- "The Making of an Indigenous Feature Film", 1992 Hawaii International Film Festival, Honolulu, Hawaii, USA
- "Aboriginal Films in Focus", The 1993 Writers Festival, Mitchell Library, Sydney, NSW, Australia
- "History of Indigenous Oppression", 1993 Pacific Islanders in Communication, Honolulu, Hawaii
- "Aboriginal Theatre in the 90s – Still Working from the Fringe", 1993 National Playwrights Conference, Australian National University, Canberra, ACT, Australia
