= Murder of Lois Roberts =

Murder of Australian woman

Lois Roberts
- Born: Lois Martha Roberts; 8 July 1959
- Disappeared: 31 July 1998
- Died: c. 31 July 1998; Nimbin Police Station
- Body discovered: January 1999

Lois Martha Roberts (8 July 1959 – c. 31 July 1998) was an Australian murder victim, whose death near Nimbin, New South Wales, in 1998 remains unsolved.

== Background ==
Lois Martha Roberts was the daughter of Pastor Frank Roberts, a minister with the Church of Christ and an Aboriginal activist, and Muriel Roberts. She was the twin sister of the arts administrator and broadcaster Rhoda Roberts, and the sister of Philip and Mark. Brought up and educated in the Lismore region in northern New South Wales, Roberts trained as a hairdresser until, at age 20, she was seriously injured in a car accident, sustaining permanent brain damage.

She was rehabilitated sufficiently to care for herself and went to live on her own near Lismore, but was not able to manage relationships well. Subsequently, she had two children who were raised by her mother and twin sister Rhoda.

== Disappearance ==
Roberts was last seen outside Nimbin Police Station on 31 July 1998. It would appear that she was abducted while hitch-hiking between Nimbin and Lismore and then tortured and abused before being killed. Her badly mutilated body was found about six months after her disappearance, in January 1999. A bushwalker found the remains in Whian Whian State Forest, near Dunoon, deep in thick bush some way off a fire trail.

== Investigation and aftermath ==
An inquest was held in June 2002. The senior stipendiary magistrate of the Lismore Court Circuit, Jeff Linden, sitting as a coroner returned an open finding after a two-week hearing.

The perpetrator or perpetrators of the crime have never been identified.

== Film ==
Indigenous filmmaker Ivan Sen made a documentary film about the murder and its impact on the family, A Sister's Love. It was released in 2007 and shown on ABC Television.

== See also ==
- Bowraville Murders
- List of solved missing person cases: 1950–1999
- List of unsolved murders (1980–1999)
