= Sonia Borg =

Australian screenwriter (1931–2016)

- Born: Sonia Ingeborg Borg; 20 February 1931; Vienna, Austria
- Died: 4 February 2016 (aged 84); Apollo Bay, Victoria, Australia
- Citizenship: Australian
- Occupation: Screenwriter

Sonia Ingeborg Borg AM (20 February 1931 – 4 February 2016) was an Austrian-Australian writer and producer, one of the leading screenwriters of Australian films and TV in the 1960 and 70s. After extensive experience in theatre in Germany, India and South-East Asia she moved to Australia in 1961 and worked as a stage and television actress before becoming joining Crawford Productions in Melbourne. She wrote, produced and acted at Crawfords until the mid-1970s and worked on most of the company's dramas of the period in a range of roles.

In the late 1970s, she also became known for writing children's films, often about animals, such as Storm Boy and Blue Fin both based on books by Colin Thiele.

== Awards and honours ==
In 1985, Borg was awarded a Member of the Order of Australia for her services to the film and television industry.

== Select Writings ==
- Homicide (1964–73; TV series)
- Division 4 (1970–75; TV series)
- Matlock Police (1971–75; TV series)
- A Time for Love – Episode: "Next Time Will Be Better" (1972)
- Rush (1974; TV series)
- Power Without Glory (1976; mini series)
- Solo One (1976; TV series)
- Lasseter (1976; unmade film about Lasseters search
- Storm Boy (1976)
- Blue Fin (1978)
- The Min Min (1978; unmade feature)
- Women of the Sun (1981; TV series)
- I Can Jump Puddles (1981; TV movies)
- Dusty (1983)
- Colour in the Creek (1985; TV series)
- Dark Age (1987)
- Ratbag Hero (1991; TV miniseries)
