= Justine Saunders =

Australian actress (1953–2007)

- Saunders in a scene from TV series Number 96.
- Born: Justine Florence Saunders; 20 February 1953; Quilpie, Queensland, Australia
- Died: 15 April 2007 (aged 54); Sydney, New South Wales, Australia
- Occupation: Actress
- Years active: 1974–2002
- Known for: Number 96 (TV series), as Rhonda Jackson; Prisoner (TV series), as Pamela Madigan
- Awards: Aboriginal Artist of the Year Award (1985); Order of Australia (1991, rejected 2000); Red Ochre Award 1999

Justine Florence Saunders (20 February 1953 – 15 April 2007) was an Australian stage, television and film actress. She was a member of the Woppaburra, an Australian Aboriginal people, from the Kanomie clan of Great Keppel Island in Queensland. On the small screen she appeared in numerous series, mini-series and telemovies.

== Screen roles ==
Saunders having started her career in theatre, made her screen debut in the television serial Rush in 1974, but first came to prominence as a cast member of soap opera Number 96 in 1976, as Rhonda Jackson. in a brief story arc portraying a character defending the rights of indigenous Australians. Subsequently, in 1986 she became best known for her role as social worker Pamela Madigan in the serial Prisoner.

Other television credits include: Skyways, Women of the Sun (1981), Farscape, Blue Heelers, and MDA.

Her film work includes The Chant of Jimmie Blacksmith and The Fringe Dwellers.

== Personal ==
Saunders was born next to a railway track. At the age of 11, as a member of the Stolen Generation, she was removed from her mother Heather and taken to Brisbane and placed in a convent. Heather was not told of Justine's whereabouts for more than ten years, and spent much of that time searching for her.

In April 2007, Saunders died of cancer at Hawkesbury District Hospital, Sydney, aged 54.

== Honours and awards ==
=== Order of Australia Medal ===
In 1991, Saunders was awarded a Medal of the Order of Australia (OAM), for her services to the performing arts, her services to the National Aboriginal Theatre, and for her assistance in setting up the Black Theatre and the Aboriginal National Theatre Trust.

In 2000, through the indigenous Senator Aden Ridgeway, she returned the medal in protest at the emotional turmoil her mother was suffering over the Howard government's denial of the term "stolen generation".

=== Other awards ===
- 1985 inaugural Aboriginal Artist of the Year award.
- 1999 Red Ochre Award - Australia Council for the Arts

== Filmography ==
=== Film ===
Year	Title	Role	Type
1974	Essington		TV movie
1977	The Cake Man	Ruby	TV movie
1978	The Death Train	Greg's wife	TV movie
1978	The Chant of Jimmie Blacksmith	Nancy	Feature film
1983	Chase Through the Night	Mary	TV movie
1984	Mail Order Bride	Irid	TV movie
1986	Charley's Web	Joan Lynch	TV movie
1986	The Fringe Dwellers	Mollie Comeaway	Feature film
1988	Touch the Sun: Top Enders	Elva	TV movie
1991	Until the End of the World	Maisie	Feature film
1992	Jindalee Lady		Feature film
1997	The Tower	Louise	TV movie

=== Television ===
Year	Title	Role	Type
1974	Rush	Werowey	TV series
1975	Ben Hall	Jununji	TV series
1976	Luke's Kingdom	Aboriginal girl	TV series
1976	Number 96	Rhonda Jackson	TV series
1977	Pig in a Poke	Maureen	TV series
1977; 1984; 1985	The Mike Walsh Show	Guest	TV series, 3 episodes
1978	Against the Wind	Ngilgi	TV miniseries
1979	Top Mates	Mrs. Jackson	TV miniseries
1979	Skyways	Flight attendant Helen Smith	TV series
1981	Women of the Sun	Mérida Anderson	TV miniseries
1982	Silent Reach	Allison Burnie	TV miniseries
1986	Prisoner: Cell Block H	Pamela Madigan	TV series
1987	A Country Practice	Brenda Dwyer	TV series, episode part 1 and 2: "Birds of Prey"
1988	The First Australians	Co-presenter	TV anthology series
1992	G.P.	Dolly	TV series
1989-1992	The Flying Doctors	Bessie / Magistrate Krum	TV series
1992	The Midday Show	Herself (with Jack Thompson)	TV series, 1 episode
1994	Heartland	Millie Carmichael	TV miniseries
1996	House Gang	President of Australia	TV series
1998	The Violent Earth	Aunt Junie	TV miniseries
2000	Farscape	Altana	TV series
	Blue Heelers	Annie Baker	TV series
2002	MDA	Ruby McKinnon	TV series

== Theatre ==
=== As actor ===
Year	Title	Role	Type
1975	The Cake Man		Black Theatre Arts and Culture Centre
1976	Basically Black		Space Theatre, Adelaide
1977	The Cake Man	Mother / Ruby	Bondi Pavilion
1980	Bullie's House	Duluma (Doolie)	Nimrod Upstairs
1981	Buckley's!	Del	Playhouse, Adelaide
1982	The Cake Man		University of NSW Parade Theatre, Universal Theatre, Melbourne
1983	The Marginal Farm		Russell Street Theatre
1984	The Cake Man		Phillip Street Theatre
1985	Bullie's House	Duluma (Doolie)	Long Wharf Theatre
1987	No Trouble		Universal Theatre, Melbourne
1987	Coordah		Curtin University
1988	Not the 1988 Party!		Belvoir Street Theatre
1988	Capricornia		Belvoir Street Theatre, Parramatta Cultural Centre, Darwin Performing Arts Centre, Canberra Theatre
1988	The 16th Australian National Playwrights' Conference		UNSW Parade Theatre
1989	A Special Place		Cremorne Theatre
1989	The Currency Lass		Q Theatre, Penrith
1990	Capricornia	Junie / Sally / Fat Anna	Playhouse, Adelaide, Playhouse, Melbourne
1991	The Crucible		Sydney Opera House
1994	No Sugar		Ballina Street Bridge, Lismore
1994	Sistergirl		Russell Street Theatre
1995	Because You are Mine		ANU
1996	The Commission / The Aboriginal Protesters		Weimar, Germany, Berlin, Germany, The Performance Space Redfern
1996	Island in the Sun		Price Theatre, Adelaide
1996	Black Mary		Sydney Street Theatre, Brisbane
1997	A Midsummer Night's Dream	Kangaroo	Wharf Theatre with Sydney Theatre Company
1999	Conversations at the Ryan Hotel		Star Court Theatre, Lismore
2000	La Dispute	Carise	Wharf Theatre
2000	Black Medea		Wharf Theatre
2001	Sydney Gay & Lesbian Mardi Gras Festival 2001: The Stars Are Brightly Shining		State Theatre, Sydney
2001	The Twilight Series		Collins Street Baptist Church, Melbourne
2003-04	Last Cab to Darwin		Octagon Theatre, Perth, Sydney Opera House, Broken Hill Entertainment Centre, Orange Civic Theatre, Glen Street Theatre, Manning Entertainment Centre, Newcastle Civic Theatre, Theatre Royal, Hobart, Princess Theatre, Launceston, IMB Theatre, Wollongong, Darwin Entertainment Centre, The Butter Factory Theatre, Wodonga
2005	Black Medea		Belvoir Street Theatre, Malthouse Theatre

=== As director ===
Year	Title	Role	Type
1989	The Second National Aboriginal Playwrights' Conference	Director	Macquarie University
