= Backlash (1986 film) =

Australian drama directed by Bill Bennett

- Directed by: Bill Bennett
- Written by: Bill Bennett
- Produced by: Bill Bennett
- Starring: David Argue; Gia Carides; Lydia Miller
- Cinematography: Tony Wilson
- Edited by: Denise Hunter
- Music by: Michael Atkinson; Michael Spicer
- Distributed by: Dendy Films
- Release date: 1986
- Running time: 89 minutes
- Country: Australia
- Language: English
- Budget: AU $225,000 or $200,000

Backlash is a 1986 Australian film directed by Bill Bennett.

== Plot ==
Police officers Trevor Darling (David Argue) and Nikki Iceton (Gia Carides) escort a young Aboriginal woman Kath (Lydia Miller) to the New South Wales outback to stand trial. After getting stranded in the desert a bond grows between them. By the time they are rescued, both Nikki and Trevor believe Kath is innocent.

== Cast ==
- David Argue as Trevor Darling
- Gia Carides as Nikki Iceton
- Lydia Miller as Kath
- Brian Syron as The Executioner
- Jennifer Cluff as Waitress

== Production ==
Bill Bennett had raised $175,000 from the BBC and ABC to make a documentary about black tracker Jimmy James but was reluctant to proceed. He came up with the idea for the film and wondered if he could use the money to make a feature. Bennett got approval from the tax department and most investors to do this, with J C Williamson Ltd stepping in for the BBC and ABC. The final $50,000 of the budget came from Bennett himself.

Bennett later said "when I start to think about a film, I don't think about it in terms of plot, I think about it in terms of theme. Then I often contrive a plot to explore a theme. In Backlash the theme that I really wanted to explore was, in broad terms, racism, but, specifically, people who are different. That was really what I wanted to explore. I was also interested in the Aboriginal spirituality, which I tried to get across in the Brian Syron character and the sense of the spiritual aspect of the man."

Bennett wrote a 27 page scene breakdown with no dialogue - this would be improvised by the cast. "It has been my contention that in Australian films actors have always been treated as props... so I decided to give them more power," he said. Bennett wanted to add some levity in the material and so cast David Argue, who had impressed him on stage. He was impressed by Gia Carides' improvisational skills in theatresports and cast her to act alongside him. Nurse Lydia Miller rounded out the main cast.

The film was shot chronologically over 18 days. Bennett said "David's character was very volatile and aggressive, so was Gia's at times. There wa a thin line between what happened on camera and off." During filming out near Broken Hill Bennett often clashed with David Argue, who quit a week before shooting ended. However he came back and completed the film. Argue later called making the movie "a total bloody nightmare, but I think it's the best thing I've ever done."

== Release ==
Bennett won 2 awards at the 1987 Cognac Festival du Film Policier for the film. The film was screened in the Un Certain Regard section at the 1986 Cannes Film Festival.

=== Box office ===
Bennett said "I gave no thought about how it was going to be received, because I figured that it was made on such a low budget that, if it bombed, if nobody ever saw it, then it wouldn't really matter. At least I'd be able to get some money from somewhere to pay the investors back. But as it turned out, the film was probably, per dollar spent, the most successful film I've done."

=== US release ===
The film was sold to a US distributor, who asked for the ending to be re-shot. Bennett was given $50,000 to re-shoot it using the original cast. However the executive who asked for the new ending was replaced by another executive who disliked the new ending, and asked for a happy ending. Bennett estimated he spent $40,000 in legal fees to restore the original ending. "I was naive, I had no clout and they gutted me," he said.

=== Critical ===
Filmink wrote Bill Bennett "managed to capture the magic of Argue – it’s impossible to take your eyes off him in Backlash, he looks like someone capable of anything."
