= Andrew Schultz =

Australian composer (born 1960)

Andrew Schultz (born 18 August 1960 in Adelaide, South Australia) is an Australian classical composer. He has, since 2008, lived in Sydney, New South Wales. He studied at the Universities of Queensland and Pennsylvania and at King's College London and he has received many awards, prizes and fellowships including a Fulbright Award (1982), the Albert H. Maggs Composition Award (1985), Grand-Prix, Opera Screen de Opéra-Bastille (1991), the APRA Award for Classical Composition of the Year (1993), the Schueler Award (2007), the Paul Lowin Prize (2009) and the Centenary of Canberra Symphony Commission (2012). He holds a Bachelor of Music (Hons), Master of Music, and Doctor of Philosophy in musical composition.

His compositions cover a broad range of chamber music, orchestral and vocal works and have been performed, recorded and broadcast widely by leading groups and musicians internationally. He has held many commissions, including from the major Australian orchestras, and five Artist Fellowships from the Australia Council for the Arts.

Schultz has written a number of large scale works including three symphonies and three operas. The operas – Black River (1989), Going into Shadows (2001) and The Children's Bach (2008) – have been presented live and on film around the world (see: Black River). Other major works include Violin Concerto (1996), Journey to Horseshoe Bend (2003, based on the book by Ted Strehlow), Song of Songs (2004) and To the evening star (2009). Each of these works has been recorded, and likewise many other of his chamber and orchestral works have been released on compact disc or on-line. Journey to Horseshoe Bend and Black River are considered innovative in their socially relevant topics and their use of indigenous performers to support narratives that encompass the clash of native and settler cultures in Australia.

Schultz has held residencies and academic posts in the UK, France, the US, Canada and Australia. He is Professor of Music at the University of New South Wales in Sydney, Australia having previously been Professor of Composition at the University of Wollongong, Australia, and Head of Composition and Music Studies at the Guildhall School of Music and Drama, London.
