= Radiance (play) =

1993 play by Louis Nowra

Radiance is a play by Australian author and playwright Louis Nowra and was first performed at Belvoir Street Theatre in 1993. The play focuses on three Aboriginal half-sisters, who have gone their separate ways in life, and are reunited when they arrive for their mother's funeral service. Radiance has been written both as a stageplay and a screenplay.

== Characters ==
=== Mother ===
The mother's name is not given in the stageplay, in the screenplay she referred to by the priest as Mary McKenna. She is already deceased at the start of the play, her daughters give their views of their common mother whilst reminiscing.

It is revealed that the mother was very naive and carefree, however, her promiscuous nature was what she was most known for. Her two daughters Mae and Cressy most likely do not have the same biological father, and when child services came for them (see Stolen Generation), she willingly handed them over. Her granddaughter Nona appeared to be her favourite 'child', and she was hidden when officials visited.

The house in which she lived was given to her by Harry Wells, a local sugar cane plantation owner, most likely, as Mae believes, to keep her quiet about his affair with her. However, the mother truly believed that he loved her. She lived there for the rest of her life, with Mae caring for her in old age and her descent into senility.

=== Mae ===
The middle of the three main characters, she is the most cynical and pessimistic of them. Mae appears to be one of the poor cases of the Stolen Generation, where children of Aboriginal descent were taken by the government to be raised in boarding homes or religious institutions.

Mai worked as a nurse, however, she became attracted to a married doctor, and tried winning his affection with gifts bought with money she stole from hospital funds. When found out, she was sentenced to community service, and chose to look after her mother. When arriving, she was dismayed at the condition of the house, and repaired it whilst caring for her elderly mother. Whilst it is believed that the mother appreciated Mae's work, she really wanted Cressy or Nona instead.

When her mother went senile, Mae tried keeping her under control in public, however after a string of incidents, including biting the priest's finger and spitting on Harry Wells, Mae's final resort was to tie her mother to the chair each day. Their last confrontation was them both screaming at each other, as Mae was finally fed up with her mother refusing to tell her anything about her heritage or even to admit if she loved her daughter.

=== Nona ===
Initially, it is believed that Nona is the youngest of the three siblings, however at the end it is revealed to Nona's insistent disbelief that Cressy is her mother. Nona is very much different from her 'siblings', in fact she is almost a living representation of her grandmother. She is shown to be immature, insensitive, and naive.

Aside from various mentions of flings with different men, Nona often fantasises about 'The Black Prince', a handsome man that supposedly was her father that her grandmother made up. At first Cressy tried giving a little half-truth to Nona, in that her father was just another loser who forced himself upon her 'mother', however Nona rejects this idea. It isn't until the end, when Nona is sharing her incest fantasy about the Black Prince, that Cressy snaps and screams the complete truth out, which Nona also denies as real and runs off with her grandmother's ashes. In the screenplay, it is possible that she eventually accepts that Cressy is her mother, however she won't openly admit it.

== Film adaptions ==
Adapted in 1998 as an Australian independent film, it is the first feature film by Aboriginal director Rachel Perkins.
