= Building Bridges (1989 album) =

Studio album by Various
- Released: 1989, 1990
- Labels: CAAMA, CBS, ABC

Building Bridges (subtitled Australia Has a Black History) is an Australian compilation album containing tracks from both Aboriginal and non-Aboriginal performers, inspired by a 1988 community concert called Building Bridges. The concert was held in Australia's Bicentennial year, which included many Aboriginal protests.

The vinyl album was released in 1989 to raise money for the National Coalition of Aboriginal Organisations. It includes songs sung in Aboriginal languages. The album was released by CAAMA Music and distributed by CBS in 1989, followed by a CD album released by ABC in 1990.

It reached #47 on the Australian album charts and may have symbolised "the embrace of indigenous rock by the mainstream".

The original double-vinyl release features 27 tracks, while the later CD release features nineteen.

== TV special ==
On 24 January 1991 (two days before Australia Day), the Indigenous Australian TV series Blackout screened a special program to commemorate the original concert. With live music simulcast on Triple J featuring Midnight Oil, Yothu Yindi, Archie Roach, Mixed Relations, all-female band Mirror Mirror, Kev Carmody, and Crowded House, the special also included band members and members of the audience talking about the future of black/white relations in Australia. The program was produced by ABC TV in co-operation with the Building Bridges Association Inc.

== Track listing ==
1. Special Treatment – Paul Kelly
2. Gudurrku (The Brolga) – Yothu Yindi
3. Justice Will Be Done – Les Shillingsworth
4. Solid Rock – Goanna
5. Birth Of A Nation – Wild Pumpkins At Midnight
6. Breakneck Road – Hunters & Collectors
7. Yil Lull – Joe Geia
8. Warakurna – Midnight Oil
9. Woma Wanti – Areyonga Desert Tigers
10. Strychinine – Swamp Jockeys
11. That Hanging Business – Do-Re-Mi
12. Injustice – V. Spy V. Spy
13. Hungry Years – Weddings Parties Anything
14. Do It Rite – Cal Callaghan
15. Bad Blood – The Stetsons
16. Original Sin – INXS
17. Broken Down Man – Scrap Metal
18. Dancing In The Moonlight – Coloured Stone
19. Heaven On A Stick – James Reyne
20. Speak No Evil – Dragon
21. Tjamu Tjamu – Ilkari Maru
22. Mansion In The Slums – Crowded House
23. Spirit Of The Land – The Gravy
24. Bullant – Gondwanaland
25. Swing For The Crime – The Saints
26. Living In The Land Of Oz – Ross Wilson
27. We Have Survived – No Fixed Address
