= Building Bridges =

Building Bridges may refer to:

- Building Bridges (1989 album), an Australian multi-artist album
- Building Bridges (Paul Field album)
- "Building Bridges" (song), a country music song recorded by Larry Willoughby, Nicolette Larson, and Brooks & Dunn
- Building Bridges (residential program)
- "Building Bridges", the theme and official song of the Eurovision Song Contest 2015
- USPS Building Bridges Special Postal Cancellation Series
