= Bart Willoughby =

Australian musician

Bart Willoughby OAM
- Born: Bartholemew Edwin Willoughby; 1960 (age 65–66); Koonibba Mission, near Ceduna, South Australia, Australia
- Genres: Aboriginal rock, reggae rock
- Occupation: Musician
- Instruments: Drums, guitar, bass, piano, pipe organ
- Years active: 1978–present
- Formerly of: No Fixed Address; Coloured Stone; Mixed Relations; Yothu Yindi; Jimmy Chi & Kuckles; Goanna; Shane Howard & The Great Heart Band

Bartholomew Edwin Willoughby OAM (born 1960) is an Aboriginal Australian musician, noted for his pioneering fusion of reggae with Indigenous Australian musical influences, and for his contribution to growth of Indigenous music in Australia. A multi-instrumentalist, songwriter, and singer, he is known as a founder member and leader of the No Fixed Address, which was the first Aboriginal rock band in Australia, and the first Aboriginal band to travel overseas.

In 2024, Willoughby received the Ted Albert Award For Outstanding Services to Australian Music at the APRA Music Awards of 2024.

== Early life and education ==
Bartholomew Edwin Willoughby was born in 1960 at Koonibba Mission, near Ceduna in South Australia. He is Pitjantjatjara and Mirning on his mother's side (Southern right whale dreaming) and Kokatha on his father's side (wedge-tailed eagle dreaming). His father is from the Simpson Desert, and was raised traditionally, with Warlpiri as his first language, and artist Clifford Possum his best friend. His mother's family connections go as far as Kalgoorlie in Western Australia.

He was removed from his family at Koonibba when he was three and placed in a children's home, making him one of the Stolen Generations. He contracted bone marrow disease when he was six years old, and was encased in plaster for two and a half years. However he discovered music at a young age in the children's home, as there were pianos and organs available.

When he was 16, Willoughby found his way to the Centre for Aboriginal Studies in Music (CASM) at the University of Adelaide, where he was introduced to music and met the members of his future band, who are all related. Among other teachers, he was impressed by opera singer Howard Bellaire. Leila Rankine, a founding member of CASM, helped to care for him and guide him during this time. His first professional performance was with a Salvation Army band.

== Career ==
=== Music ===
Willoughby's musical career commenced in 1978, and in this period he developed as a distinctive Indigenous Australian musician notable for his pioneering fusion of reggae music with Aboriginal musical influences. He formed his first band, also Australia's first Indigenous rock band, No Fixed Address, in 1978, with Ricky Harrison, Leslie Lovegrove Freeman (aka Les Graham), John John Miller, and Veronica Rankine (daughter of Leila Rankine), who played saxophone. All of the members are related.

He also played with Jimmy Chi's newly-formed band Kuckles.

In 1979, No Fixed Address played its first large concert at the National Aboriginal Day event held in Taperoo, South Australia, and over the years played at numerous concerts for Aboriginal causes, including Rock Against Racism, the Artists Newsletter Association, the Campaign Against Racial Exploitation, and the National Aboriginal Country Music Festival. They toured with Cold Chisel (December 1980), Ian Dury and the Blockheads (November 1981), The Clash (February 1982),

Their 1982 single "We Have Survived", written by Willoughby when he was just 18, became an instant classic of protest music.

Willoughby and his band toured Australia in support of Peter Tosh in 1982, and a documentary of this tour was screened by SBS TV entitled Peter Tosh in Concert, featuring Willoughby and No Fixed Address. During 1982, Willoughby also played drums with Shane Howard and Goanna. After the success of the Peter Tosh tour, Willoughby and his band became the first Aboriginal band to travel overseas in 1983, and played at Madison Square Gardens. The band toured the UK in 1984, playing at nine cities including London, Bristol, Leeds, Plymouth, and Manchester. They played at the Elephant Fayre rock festival. and appeared at a concert for striking miners. A documentary of this tour No Fixed Address on Tour UK 1984 was produced and screened on SBS TV and is available on YouTube.

Returning to Australia, Willoughby joined his cousin Bunna Lawrie, and his band Coloured Stone, founded in 1977. He played drums for them between 1985 and 1986, including on their Scottish tour where they appeared with k.d. lang at the 1986 Edinburgh Festival. Coloured Stone then returned to Australia, where Coloured Stone were awarded Best Indigenous Album at the 1986 Australian Music Awards for their debut album Human Love.

Willoughby reformed No Fixed Address in 1987, and in 1988, the band toured Eastern Europe before the fall of the Berlin Wall, on a tour initiated by the Soviet Union.

Late in 1988, Willoughby was asked to play drums for Yothu Yindi and native American author and activist John Trudell, supporting Midnight Oil on their 1989 US and Canada Diesel & Dust tour. In 1989, Willoughby left Yothu Yindi to form a new band, Mixed Relations. From its inception, Mixed Relations toured extensively throughout the Aboriginal communities, Australian cities, Pacific Islands, New Zealand, and Hawaii.

Following work in Alice Springs, Northern Territory, and Surfers Paradise, Queensland, on the film Until the End of the World, Willoughby toured Australia with Shane Howard and his band. He then continued working with Mixed Relations, representing Australia at the 1990 and 1992 South Pacific Music Festival and the 1990 and 1992 Asian Music Festival.

He also played as a member of the musical theatre organisation Black Arm Band.

In 1993, the International Year of Indigenous Peoples, Willoughby and Mixed Relations were guests at indigenous festivals in Los Angeles, London, and the Wanchai Music Festival in Hong Kong.

In 2007 he formed the Bart Willoughby Band. He was the first Indigenous artist to do play the pipe organ, and played the Grand Organ in Melbourne Town Hall for a concert "We Still Live On", as part of the Melbourne Indigenous Arts Festival in 2014. In 2017, he released his second album of organ music, called Resonance.

After an hiatus of 20 years, No Fixed Address re-formed in 2008, and played at the Dreaming Festival in Woodford, Queensland, where they released a limited edition CD copy of From My Eyes. In November 2008, Willoughby played with the band at the Tarerer Festival at Killarney, and a week later at the Australasian World Music Expo in Melbourne.

From October 2013 through 2014 Willoughby was bandleader for the Malthouse Theatre production of The Shadow King, an Australian play based on King Lear, starring Jada Alberts and Jimi Bani. touring Australia at the Melbourne, Sydney, Perth, Darwin, Adelaide, and Brisbane arts festivals.

In 2016, Willoughby headlined the Yabun Festival at Victoria Park, Camperdown, Sydney.

As of 2024 he continues to front the Bart Willoughby Band. He has said that the aim of his music is to impart love, hope, and unity. He plays drums, guitar, bass, and piano.

=== Film and television ===
In 1980, Willoughby starred with another Indigenous band, Us Mob, in Ned Lander's film about Aboriginal musicians, called Wrong Side of the Road. This film was a semi-biographical drama concerning the racism levelled against Aboriginal musicians trying to get gigs in country pubs, and won the Australian Film Commission-funded Australian Film Institute's (AFI) 1981 Jury Award for its director.

No Fixed Address were the first Aboriginal band to perform on the long-running ABC Television show Countdown in October 1982, which was guest hosted by Tina Turner.

A documentary film was made of the band's UK tour in 1984.

Willoughby directed, composed, and recorded the music track with his band for Always Was - Always Will Be, which was produced, directed, and written by Indigenous filmmaker Madelaine McGrady.

In 1990, Willoughby was cast as "Ned the Computer Expert" in German director Wim Wenders' Until the end of the World starring William Hurt, Sam Neill, Ernie Dingo, David Gulpilil, and Jimmy Little.

In 1992, Willoughby was invited by Australia's first Indigenous feature film director Brian Syron to become the first Aboriginal person to compose, play and direct the music track of a feature film Jindalee Lady. The film was invited to the Dreamspeakers International Film Festival in Edmonton, Canada, in 1992, where it was acknowledged as the first feature film to be directed by a First Nations director, and to have a music track composed and directed by a First Nations composer. Following this festival, both Syron and Willoughby were invited to attend the 1992 Hawaii International Film Festival, where Jindalee Lady was nominated for the Best Feature Film. In 1993 Jindalee Lady was invited to screen at the Tinker Theatre, Woodstock, New York, as part of the Woodstock Tribute to the International Year of Indigenous People.

In 1994, Willoughby with his eldest son Woonun Willoughby appeared in the docudrama La Perouse for the Museum of Sydney and Historic Houses Trust of New South Wales, directed by Michael Riley and narrated by Justine Saunders.

In 2011, Willoughby appeared with other artists of the Black Arm Band in the documentary film Murundak: Songs of Freedom, directed by Natasha Gadd and Rhys Graham.

=== Teaching ===
During 1995 Willoughby took time out to work with his Pitjantjantjara community as music instructor to secondary school students at Yalata Anangu School, Yalata, South Australia, where he taught drums, guitar, and songwriting.

In 2023, he led one of a series of music and art workshops for children organised by Yarra City Council, "The Colour and Sound of My Totem".

== Recognition, awards, and honours ==
British punk band The Clash were fans of No Fixed Address.

In 1993 Willoughby received the inaugural Indigenous ARIA Australian Lifetime Achievement Award for his Outstanding Contribution to Indigenous Music in Australia. The award was presented by Will Smith and screened on Channel 10. Sol Bellear, acting commissioner of the Aboriginal Torres Strait Islander Commission, in presenting the award to Willoughby, said :

"Indigenous music has certainly come a long way in recent times. From 10 years ago out back of Australia, in outback hotels to internationally through Yothu Yindi, through Kev Carmody, through Archie Roach and many, many more. Let me tell you that the recipient of this very first Indigenous trophy has stood out clearly as an innovator for those people. He notched up a list of firsts that paved the way for a lot of Indigenous artists. He was the first to perform on Countdown, his was the first Aboriginal band to make a documentary, the first Aboriginal band to sign a record deal and the first, the very first, to tour overseas, and Willoughby was the first, the very first to score, play and direct the music track of a feature film itself the first to be directed by an Indigenous director. Bart's contribution to Aboriginal music in Australia is prodigious in book, film and record." Bellear, Channel 10,

There is a photographic portrait of Willoughby taken by British photojournalist Penny Tweedie in 2000, held in the collection of the National Portrait Gallery in Canberra.

In 2004, 2005 and 2006, he was nominated for the Lifetime Achievement Award at the Deadly Awards for his contribution to Indigenous music in Australia.

In 2013, Willoughby was a finalist in the Melbourne Prize for Music, and in 2016 was awarded a music fellowship by Australia Council.

In 2023, Bart Willoughby was awarded a Medal of the Order of Australia in the General Division, for service to the performing arts, particularly through music.

The APRA Awards have been presented annually since 1982 by the Australasian Performing Right Association (APRA), "honouring composers and songwriters". Willoughby was honoured in the APRA Music Awards of 2024 with the Ted Albert Award for Outstanding Services to Australian Music.

In May 2024, an exhibition celebrating his work went on display at the Australian Music Vault in Arts Centre Melbourne.

== Discography ==
List of albums, with selected details
Title	Album details
Pathways	Released 1997; Label: Formats: CD
Frequencies	Released: 2000; Label: Speaking Image (SW20017); Formats: CD
Proud (as The Bart Willoughby Band)	Released: 2012; Label: Rize of the Morning Star; Formats: CD
We Still Live On (with Deline Briscoe & Friends)	Released: 2013; Label: Regency Recordings (143206.1); Formats: CD
