= St Mary Magdalene's Church, Adelaide =

Anglo-Catholic church in Adelaide, South Australia

St Mary Magdalene's Anglican Church
- Interactive fullscreen map
- 34.9308°S 138.60340°E
- Location: City of Adelaide
- Address: 26 Moore St, Adelaide SA 5000, Australia
- Country: Australia
- Denomination: Affirming Catholicism
- Website: https://stmarymagdalenes.weebly.com/

History
- Status: Active
- Founded: 12 March 1887
- Consecrated: 4 May 1893

Administration
- Diocese: Adelaide

St Mary Magdalene's is an Anglo-Catholic church in the City of Adelaide.

== History ==
The building was constructed as mission church using materials retained from the demolition of the first St John's church. The foundation stone of the Mission Chapel of Ease was laid on 18 December 1886, and the first service held on 12 Mar 1887. The church was consecrated in the name of St Mary Magdalene by Bishop Kennion on 4 May 1893.

== School ==
In the 1970s, Leila Rankine and her sister Veronica Brodie advocated for the establishment of a new school to accommodate children living in the south-eastern corner of Adelaide city centre who were not thriving in mainstream education. The Department of Education rented a room from the church, which was initially established as the South-East Corner School. In mid-1980 the Moore Street Alternative School was established on the site, as a co-educational secondary school for Aboriginal and non-Aboriginal students. The school moved to Glandore, and today (2025) is located in Thebarton, called Warriappendi Secondary School.

== Heritage listing ==
The church building was added to the South Australian Heritage Register on 11 September 1986.
