= Leila Gurruwiwi =

Australian television presenter

- Born: 1988 (age 37–38); Nhulunbuy, Northern Territory, Australia
- Occupation: Media commentator
- Known for: The Marngrook Footy Show

Leila Gurruwiwi (born 1988) is an Australian media commentator and television show producer. She is a panel member on The Marngrook Footy Show and co-producer of an up-coming reality TV show with the working title Dance Off, currently being filmed in Arnhem Land.

== Early life ==
Gurruwiwi was born at the Gove District Hospital in Nhulunbuy and spent the first 18 months of her life in the Yolngu community of Galiwin'ku on Elcho Island in north-east Arnhem Land and is one of a group of eight siblings. She is the first cousin of Geoffrey Gurrumul Yunupingu and the aunt of Magnolia Maymuru. She is part of the Galpu clan, which is one of the many Yolngu peoples.

Gurruwiwi moved to Bendigo at 18 months of age in order to have a better education. She learnt English in school there, having previously only spoken an Indigenous language. She was educated at St Killian's Primary school and later Bendigo Catholic College.

At the age of 12 she spent 6 months in hospital with pneumonia, which severely reduced her lung capacity. This prevented her from ever playing sports or singing professionally, which had been her ambitions, and eventually led to her choice of a career in the media. Gurruwiwi also overcame significant self-esteem issues stemming from bullying in order to find a place for herself in the public eye.

== Career ==
Gurruwiwi began her career on radio station 3KND in Melbourne. When Grant Hansen first created the popular television show The Marngrook Footy Show in 2007, he invited her to work as a reporter. Having been with the show since its inception, she is often mentioned as voicing the perspectives of two under-represented groups in the AFL community: women and Indigenous Australians. Gurruwiwi's presence on the show, along with her colleague Shelley Ware, is specifically calculated to make women feel more comfortable and represented. The situation is analogous to the dearth of Indigenous representation which spawned the original idea for The Marngrook Footy Show; 50% of AFL club memberships are held by women and yet that level of participation is not reflected in the associated media.

Gurruwiwi's particular interest in Indigenous culture led to her co-producing a show with the working title "Dance Off" currently filming in Arnhem Land, Northern Territory. The show focuses on groups of Indigenous dancers competing in a dancing competition and their cultural ties. It also led to her emceeing the Survival Day activities in Belgrave in 2011.

== Filmography ==
Year	Title	Role	Notes
2014	See Me Now		Short film
2015	The Secret River	Mallabu	2 episodes
2015–2017	Glitch	Kalinda	5 episodes
