= Shelley Ware =

Australian media presenter

- Born: Adelaide, South Australia, Australia
- Occupations: Media presenter and educator
- Children: 1
- Website: www.shelleyware.com.au

Shelley Ware is an Australian television presenter, primarily known for her role in sports media such as NITV's The Marngrook Footy Show.

== Early life ==
Ware is a Yankunytjatjara and Wirangu woman from Ceduna and Adelaide (Tarndanya) in South Australia. Her father, Bob Ware, was an Indigenous rights activist and the first known Aboriginal police officer in South Australia.

== Media career ==
Ware is primarily known for her role on The Marngrook Footy Show, (Note: "Marn grook" means "ball game" in the Woiwurrung language) an Australian Football League (AFL) panel show from the National Indigenous Television (NITV) channel. Marngrook was also originally a radio show before coming to television, and Ware was a presenter on the radio version as well. She left the show for some time to raise her family, before returning to the television version of Marngrook in 2010.

Ware was one of two female reporters on The Marngrook Footy Show, with the other being Leila Gurruwiwi. Ware and Gurruwiwi were field correspondents for the show. Ware's run on the show ended when it was cancelled in 2019, and later replaced with Yokayi Footy.

She also made regular appearances on the Channel 7 show, Live and Kicking, and Morning Broad on Broad Radio. She is a member of the Outersanctum podcast.

Ware hosted AFL.com's Ware2Now? and The Colour of Your Jumper.

Ware writes a fortnightly opinion column for the Koori Mail, (Note: "Koori" is a denonym for Indigenous peoples throughout parts of the states of and New South Wales.) mainly on the topic of AFL. For Koori Mail, she has also written about other subjects such as racism in Australia towards First Nations peoples, changing the date of Australia Day/Invasion Day, and news stories related to Indigenous people.

== Other ventures ==
Ware has worked as an educator for over twenty years, as well as contributing to the Australian curriculum through writing teachers' resources for many pieces of Indigenous media. She authored a textbook for primary school teachers titled Sunshine Classics Teaching Notes.

She also wrote a short story for the children's comedic fiction anthology book, Total Quack Up Again.

== Advocacy ==
Ware is a Lifetime Ambassador of the Indigenous Literacy Foundation (ILF), an Australian charity which supports and advocates for better literacy outcomes for Indigenous people. She is involved in the ILF's Creative Initiative, which offers week-long writing and illustration workshops for high school students, at the end of which they complete and publish their own book.

Ware is a member of the Carlton Football Club's Reconciliation Action Plan (RAP) committee. The Carlton RAP aims to encourage acceptance and support of Indigenous Australians' cultures, histories and communities, as well as forming an anti-racism policy within the club, combating racism in Australian rules football.

== Awards and honours ==
In 2019, Ware was the recipient of the Essendon Football Club's Fujitsu General Football Woman of the Year award, presented by the Essendon Women’s Network. She was honoured for her two decades of contributions to AFL and advocacy for women and Indigenous people in sport.

== Personal life ==
Ware is married to her husband, Steven, and has one son. They now live in Melbourne (Naarm), Victoria.
