= 1981 Australian Film Institute Awards =

Australian film awards ceremony in 1981

- Date: Wednesday, 16 September 1981
- Site: Regent Theatre; Sydney, New South Wales
- Hosted by: John Bluthal

Highlights
- Best Film: Gallipoli

Television coverage
- Network: ABC

The 23rd Australian Film Institute Awards (generally known as the AFI Awards) were held at the Regent Theatre, in Sydney, New South Wales on 16 September 1981. Presented by the Australian Film Institute (AFI), the awards celebrated the best in Australian feature film, documentary and short film productions of 1981. The ceremony was televised in Australia on ABC for the third year running, with John Bluthal presiding over the event.

Gallipoli won nine of the twelve awards it was nominated for, including Best Film. Other films with multiple nominations were Hoodwink with eight, Winter of Our Dreams, The Club and Fatty Finn with seven, The Survivor and Roadgames with four, Wrong Side of the Road with three, and Grendel Grendel Grendel with two. Phillip Adams was the recipient of the Raymond Longford Award

== Winners and nominees ==
Gallipoli (1981) received the most feature-film nominations with twelve, winning in nine categories including Best Film, Best Achievement in Directing for Peter Weir, Best Screenplay for David Williamson, Best Achievement in Cinematography for Russell Boyd, Best Performance by an Actor in a Leading Role for Mel Gibson and Best Performance by an Actor in a Supporting Role for Bill Hunter. Other films with multiple nominations were Hoodwink with eight, Winter of Our Dreams, The Club and Fatty Finn with seven, The Survivor and Roadgames with four, Wrong Side of the Road with three, and Grendel Grendel Grendel with two.

Individuals with multiple nominations were sound designer Peter Fenton with three for Best Sound, winning for his work on Gallipoli; sound designer Andrew Steuart received two nominations in the Best Sound category without a win; Judy Davis was nominated for Best Performance by an Actress in a Leading Role and Best Performance by an Actress in a Supporting Role for her roles in Winter of Our Dreams and Hoodwink, respectively, picking up both prizes; Wendy Weir gained two nominations for Best Achievement in Art Direction and Best Achievement in Costume Design, winning in the former category; David Williamson, who was given the Best Screenplay award, was also further nominated for his adapted screenplay of The Club in the same category.

=== Feature film ===
Best Film	Best Achievement in Directing
Gallipoli – Robert Stigwood and Patricia Lovell; The Club – Matt Carroll; Winter of Our Dreams – Richard Mason; Wrong Side of the Road – Ned Lander and Graeme Isaac	Peter Weir – Gallipoli; Bruce Beresford – The Club; John Duigan – Winter of Our Dreams; Claude Whatham – Hoodwink
Best Performance by an Actor in a Leading Role	Best Performance by an Actress in a Leading Role
Mel Gibson – Gallipoli as Frank Dunne; John Hargreaves – Hoodwink as Martin Stang; Graham Kennedy – The Club as Ted Parker; Mark Lee – Gallipoli as Archy Hamilton	Judy Davis – Winter of Our Dreams as Lou; Jenny Agutter – The Survivor as Hobbs; Lorraine Bayly – Fatty Finn as Maggie McGrath; Noni Hazelhurst – Fatty Finn as Myrtle Finn
Best Performance by an Actor in a Supporting Role	Best Performance by an Actress in a Supporting Role
Bill Hunter – Gallipoli as Major Barton; Max Cullen – Hoodwink as Buster; Harold Hopkins – The Club as Danny Rowe; Bill Kerr – Gallipoli as Jack	Judy Davis – Hoodwink as Sarah; Cathy Downes – Winter of Our Dreams as Gretel; Marion Edward – Roadgames as Madeleine "Frita" Day; Rebecca Rigg – Fatty Finn as Tilly
Best Achievement in Cinematography	Best Achievement in Film Editing
Gallipoli – Russell Boyd; Roadgames – Vincent Monton; The Survivor – John Seale; The Club – Donald McAlpine	Gallipoli – William Anderson; Fatty Finn – Robert Gibson; Hoodwink – Nicholas Beauman; Roadgames – Edward McQueen-Mason
Best Original Music Score	Best Sound
Fatty Finn – Rory O'Donoghue and Grahame Bond; Grendel Grendel Grendel – Bruce Smeaton; Roadgames – Brian May; Wrong Side of the Road – No Fixed Address and Us Mob	Gallipoli – Don Connolly, Greg Bell and Peter Fenton; Hoodwink – Gary Wilkins, Andrew Steuart and Peter Fenton; The Survivor – Peter Fenton, Jack Friedman, Bruce Lamshed and Tim Lloyd; Winter of Our Dreams – Lloyd Carrick, Andrew Steuart, Phil Judd and Phil Hayward
Best Achievement in Art Direction	Best Achievement in Costume Design
Gallipoli – Herbert Pinter and Wendy Weir; Fatty Finn – Lissa Coote; Grendel Grendel Grendel – Alex Stitt; The Survivor – Bernard Hides; Winter of Our Dreams – Lee Whitmore	Fatty Finn – Norma Moriceau; Gallipoli – Terry Ryan and Wendy Weir; Hoodwink – Ross Major; The Club – Ruth De la Lande
Best Screenplay
Gallipoli – David Williamson; The Club – David Williamson, based on the play of the same name by David Williamson; Hoodwink – Ken Quinnell, based on the story of con artist Carl Synnerdahl; Winter of Our Dreams – John Duigan

=== Non-feature film ===
Best Documentary Film	Best Animated Film
Stepping Out – Chris Noonan; Backs to the Blast – Harry Bardwell; Public Enemy Number One – David Bradbury; Waiting for Harry – Australian Institute of Aboriginal and Torres Strait Islander Studies and Kim McKenzie	The Animation Game – Eric Halliday and David Johnston; Bushed – Swinburne Institute of Technology and Steve French; Foxbat and the Mimi – Swinburne Institute of Technology and John Skibinski
Best Short Fiction Film	Best Experimental Film
Captives of Care – Don Catchlove and Stephen Wallace; Mallacoota Stampede – Peter Tammer; Piece of Cake – Pamela H. Vanneck and Mitch Mathews; The Report – Pam Scott and Tony Wheeler	Drink the Moon – Mark Foster; Refined Fire – George Gittoes; Suburban Windows – Robert Wyatt; Urban Spaces – Paul Winkler
Best Cinematography in a Documentary
Desire – Louis Irving; Ant – David Collyer and Geoff Hall; The Silent Conversation – Joseph Pickering

=== Special awards ===
Wrong Side of the Road received the Jury Prize. The Raymond Longford Award given to a person for their life's work in the Australian film and television industry, was presented to Australian journalist and producer Phillip Adams.
