= Side of the road =

Side of the road may refer to:

- Driving on the left or right
- Shoulder (road), a reserved area alongside the verge of a road or motorway
- Sidewalk, also known as a pavement or footpath

== See also ==
- "Bright Side of the Road", song by Van Morrison
- Wrong Side of the Road, a low-budget film made in South Australia in 1980
