= Brenda Gifford =

Australian composer and musician

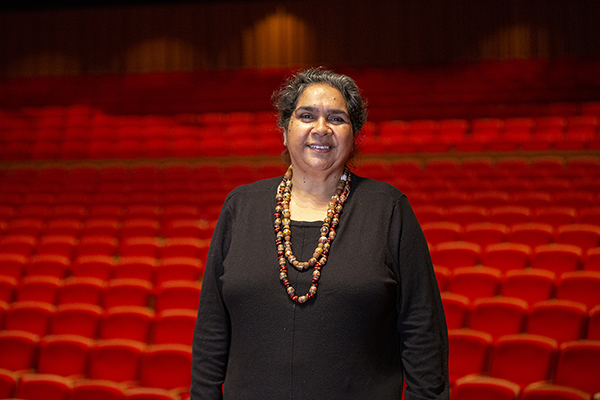

Background information
- Born: 1968 (age 57–58); Australia
- Genres: Classical
- Occupations: Composer, music archivist

Brenda Gifford (born 1968) is an Australian Yuin classical composer, saxophonist and pianist. She was a member of the Australian rock band Mixed Relations. She is based in Canberra and was an archivist in the Indigenous Collection Branch of the National Film and Sound Archive of Australia (NFSA).

== Career ==
Gifford was born in 1968 and grew up in Sydney and Wreck Bay, near Jervis Bay, New South Wales.

Beginning in the late 1980s Gifford played saxophone and piano as a member of the band Mixed Relations with Bart Willoughby. During the 1990s she contributed to Kev Carmody's 1991 album Eulogy (For A Black Person), and taught music at Eora College in Redfern, New South Wales. She left her teaching job to focus on the band as it became more popular.

Mixed Relations toured internationally and gained local success when their single Aboriginal Woman reached #89 on Triple J's Hottest 100 in 1993. The group disbanded by the end of the 1990s, and after a break of several years, Gifford began a new career as a composer.

In 2016, Gifford participated in the AMPlify Indigenous Composer Initiative pilot program, which aimed to support the creation of new work by Aboriginal and Torres Strait Islander composers. The works were then performed by Ensemble Offspring in concerts between 2017 and 2018. This led to Gifford being commissioned by Canberra International Music Festival to create her Gambambarawaraga suite. The nine part suite, which takes its name from the word for seasons in the Dhurgha language, was performed at the festival in 2018. Songs from the suite were later included on the album Music for the Dreaming which was nominated for an ARIA Award for Best Children's Album in 2019. The album contained new versions from Gifford's Gambambarawaraga suite performed by Ensemble Offspring with Kamil Ellis.

In 2017 Gifford was one of the first group in the Ngarra-Burria: First Peoples Composers program and in 2018 took part in the 2018 Composing Women Program with the Sydney Conservatorium of Music where Claire Chase worked with Gifford and four other Australian composers in creating new works. The five composers then travelled to New York where their work was performed with Chase. Gifford's Mungala (Clouds) featured Chase on flute accompanied by traditional clap sticks played by percussionist Bree van Reyk. Gifford was also included in the 2020-2021 program and developed a new project with Sydney Dance Company. As part of her work she scored dancer Joel Bray's Wagan (Wiradjuri for 'Raven') which was performed in 2020.

In 2020, Gifford worked with Ensemble Offspring again when she became their inaugural First Nations Composer in Residence. In the same year she was also commissioned to create a new work Djiribawal to open the Canberra International Music Festival 2020. The work was later reimagined for performing with additional instruments and electronic soundscapes in 2021 and 2022.

All concerts by Sydney Chamber Choir in 2021 opened with a performance of Gifford's Mother Earth/Minga Bagan, an acknowledgement of country commissioned by the choir.

In her work at the National Film and Sound Archive she curated notes and blogs for the NFSA website, and her work was used as liner notes for a reissue of Vic Simms' album The Loner.

In 2023, Gifford was the recipient of the Merlyn Myer Music Commission.

She was awarded the First Nations Fellowship, at the 2024 First Nations Arts and Culture Awards.

== Selected works ==
2021 - Dharawa Miriwa (night sky) - Commissioned by PLEXUS

2021 - Minga bagan

2020 - Djiribawal

2020 - Wagan

2018 - Mungala (Clouds)

2018 - Music for The Dreaming
