= Indigenous music of Australia =

Music of Aboriginal Australians and Torres Strait Islanders

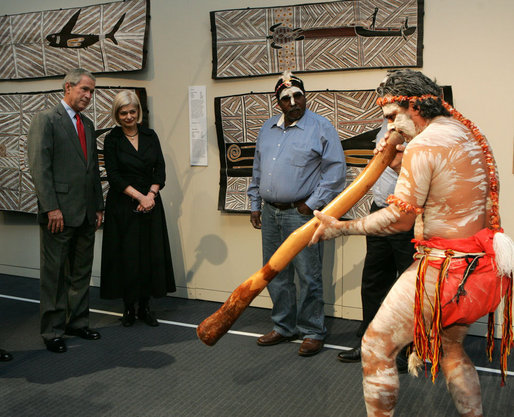
Performance of Aboriginal song and dance in the Australian National Maritime Museum in Sydney for US president George W. Bush.

Indigenous music of Australia comprises the music of the Aboriginal and Torres Strait Islander peoples of Australia, intersecting with their cultural and ceremonial observances, through the millennia of their individual and collective histories to the present day. The traditional forms include many aspects of performance and musical instrumentation that are unique to particular regions or Aboriginal Australian groups; and some elements of musical tradition are common or widespread through much of the Australian continent, and even beyond. The music of the Torres Strait Islanders is related to that of adjacent parts of New Guinea. Music is a vital part of Indigenous Australians' cultural maintenance.

In addition to these Indigenous traditions and musical heritage, ever since the 18th-century European colonisation of Australia began, Indigenous Australian musicians and performers have adopted and interpreted many of the imported Western musical styles, often informed by and in combination with traditional instruments and sensibilities. Similarly, non-Indigenous artists and performers have adapted, used and sampled Indigenous Australian styles and instruments in their works. Contemporary musical styles such as rock and roll, country, rap, hip hop and reggae have all featured a variety of notable Indigenous Australian performers.

== Traditional instruments ==
=== Didgeridoo ===
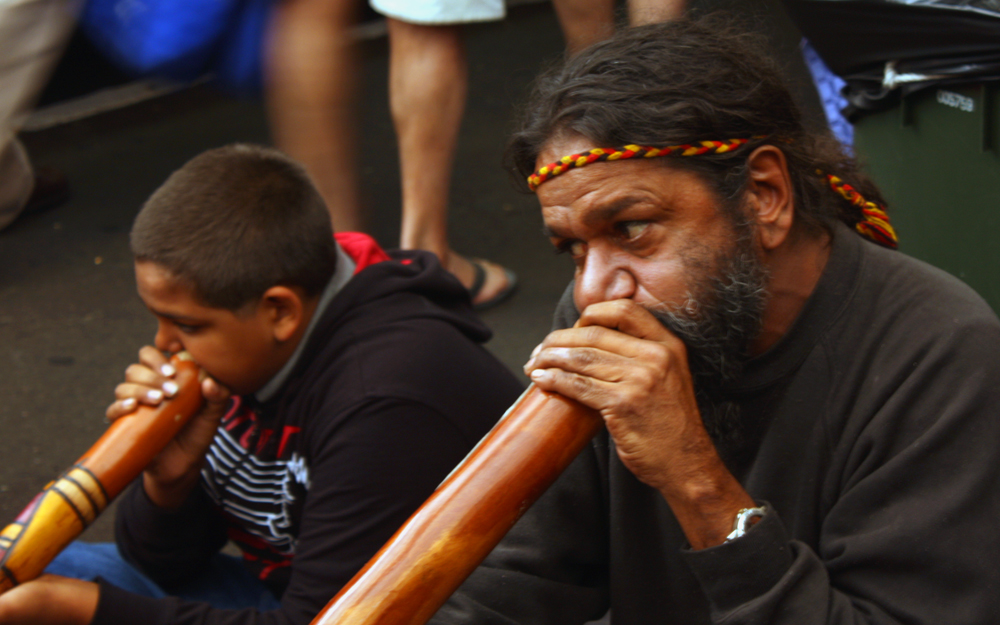
Buskers playing didgeridoos at Fremantle Markets, 2009

A didgeridoo is a type of musical instrument that, according to western musicological classification, falls into the category of aerophone. It is one of the oldest instruments to date. It consists of a long tube, without finger holes, through which the player blows. It is sometimes fitted with a mouthpiece of beeswax. Didgeridoos are traditionally made of eucalyptus, but contemporary materials such as PVC piping are used. In traditional situations it is played only by men, usually as an accompaniment to ceremonial or recreational singing, or, much more rarely, as a solo instrument. Skilled players use the technique of circular breathing to achieve a continuous sound, and also employ techniques for inducing multiple harmonic resonances. Although traditionally the instrument was not widespread around the country - it was only used by Aboriginal groups in the most northerly areas - today it is commonly considered the national instrument of Aboriginal Australians and is world-renowned as a unique and iconic instrument. However, many Northern Aboriginal people continue to strenuously object to its frequent, inappropriate, use by both uninitiated Indigenous people of either gender, and by non-Indigenous Australians. Famous players include Djalu Gurruwiwi, Mark Atkins, William Barton, David Hudson, Joe Geia and Shane Underwood as well as white virtuoso Charlie McMahon.

=== Clapsticks ===
A clapstick is a type of musical instrument that, according to western musicological classification, falls into the category of percussion. Unlike drumsticks, which are generally used to strike a drum, clapsticks are intended for striking one stick on another, and people as well. They are of oval shape with paintings of snakes, lizards, birds and more. Also called 'tatty' sticks.

=== Gum leaf ===
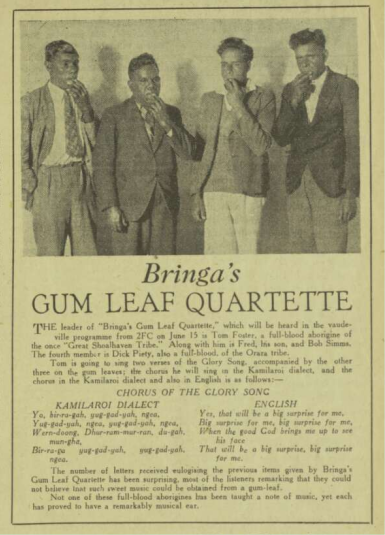
Tom Foster conducts his Gum Leaf Band

The leaf of the Eucalyptus gum tree is used as a hand-held free reed instrument. The instrument was originally used to call birds. An example is the "Coo-ee" call seen in the opening credits of hit television series Skippy.

=== Bullroarer ===
The bullroarer (or bull roarer) is an instrument used in ceremonial ritual. It consists of a few feet of cord attached to a flat piece of wood. The player holds the free end of the cord and swings the piece of wood around in circles, thus creating a humming sound. The intensity of the sound can be varied by changing the velocity of the rotation.

=== Rasp ===
Percussive rasp similar to a Güiro or serrated club, along which the edge of a boomerang is drawn to produce a trill.

== Traditional forms ==
=== Clan songs/manikay ===
Manikay are "clan songs" of some groups of Yolngu people of north-east Arnhem Land, including Yirrkala. These songs are often about clan or family history or other historical or mythological events of the area, social relationships and love, and are frequently updated to take into account popular films and music. Similar clan songs are known as emeba on Groote Eylandt. Manikay have been described as the "sacred song tradition performed by the Yolŋu when conducting public ceremonies...a medium through which the Yolŋu interpret reality, define their humanity, reckon their ancestral lineages, and evidence ownership of their hereditary homelands through their ability to sing in the tradition of their ancestors". It is often translated as a "clan song", and ethnomusicologists and social anthropologists have studied the form since the 1950s.

Manikay is often used to describe the song component of the Arnhem Land ceremony, while bunggul (see below) refers to the dance, although each word on its own is also sometimes used to refer to both components.

=== Songlines ===
Songlines, also known as "dreaming tracks", represent paths across the land or sky marking the routes followed by creator beings during The Dreaming. The paths of the songlines are recorded in traditional song cycles, stories, dance, and art, and are often the basis of ceremonies. Intricate series of song cycles identify landmarks and tracking mechanisms for navigation.

=== Transcription ===
Early visitors and settlers published a number of transcriptions of traditional Aboriginal music. The earliest transcription of Aboriginal music was by Edward Jones (Bardd y Brenin) in London in 1793, published in Musical Curiosities, 1811. Two Eora men (of the Sydney area in New South Wales), Yemmerrawanne and Bennelong, had travelled to England with Arthur Phillip, and while they were in London gave a recital of a song in the Dharug language.

=== Northern Australia ===
==== Bunggul ====
The Yolngu term Bunggul refers to song, music and dance, which form a ceremony in central to eastern Arnhem Land, Northern Territory. It is performed east of the Mann River as far south as Mainoru and southeast across the Rose River region to Numbulwar. The songs contain specific words and use a similar structure, and there is often a "final recitative", where lyrics are sung for a long period after the didjeridu and stick beating has stopped. Some songs tell of epic journeys in the far past, of ancestors in the Dreaming; Elkin cited an example of a song series from consisting of 188 songs. Those of the Djatpangarri style, tell of everyday events. The lyrics differ much from song to song, and can vary from performance to performance, improvised by the musicians and lead "songman", within certain structures and patterns. The leader of the ritual choreographs not only the dancers, but also the music, in this form, in contrast to western Arnhem Land, where the songman leads.

Bunggul is often used to describe the dance component of the ceremony, while manikay refers to the songs.

The Garma Festival has a nightly bunggul performance. In 2014, The Monthly's "Best of Australian Arts" edition described the bunggul as "an exhilarating performance" and "an example of one of the world’s oldest musical traditions. We must do everything to recognise its enormous value to our lives as Australians". In 2023, a special bunggul was performed in honour of the recently deceased Yolngu leader and land rights champion Galarrwuy Yunupingu.

==== Kun-borrk ====
Kun-borrk (also spelt kunborrk and gunborg) originated east of the Adelaide, southeast towards Katherine and across to just east of the Mann River and southeast almost to Rose River, then along the coastline beyond Borroloola.

Kun-borrk songs always include actual words, in contrast to other song styles of the region which may consist of sounds, and there are often brief breaks in the songs. The songs nearly always start with the didjeridu, soon followed by sticks (percussion) and vocals in that order. Kun-borrk songs from Kunbarllanjnja (Gunbalanya) almost always follow the order of didjeridu, voice then sticks. Kun-borrk songs terminate most commonly with the didjeridu first, often in conjunction with vocals. Sometimes the vocals finish first, sometimes the clap sticks, but the didjeridu never starts last or finishes last.

David Blanasi is known as a master of the tradition of Kun-borrk, with his grandson Darryl Dikarrna continuing the tradition.

==== Wajarra ====
Wajarra are non-sacred songs originating in the Gurindji region of the Northern Territory and performed for fun and entertainment. During the twentieth century they spread great distances across northern and western Australia, including along the stock routes of the pastoral industry, as Aboriginal workers and their families travelled between stations. Wave Hill Station was the site of much of this exchange.

==== Wangga ====
Wangga originated near the South Alligator River. An extremely high note starts the song, accompanied by rhythmic percussion, followed by a sudden shift to a low tone. Wangga is typically performed by one or two singers with clapsticks and one didgeridoo player. The occasion is usually a circumcision ceremony or a ceremony to purify a dead person's belongings with smoke.

== Contemporary trends ==
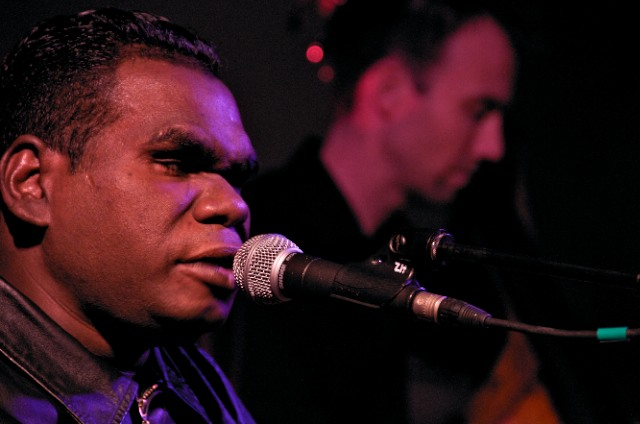
Geoffrey Gurrumul Yunupingu was a contemporary Indigenous performer who sang in the Yolŋu Matha languages.

A number of Indigenous Australians have achieved mainstream prominence, such as Jimmy Little (pop), Yothu Yindi (Australian aboriginal rock), Troy Cassar-Daley (country), Jessica Mauboy (pop, R&B), NoKTuRNL (rap metal) and the Warumpi Band (Australian aboriginal rock). Indigenous music has also gained broad exposure through the world music movement and in particular the WOMADelaide festivals. Geoffrey Gurrumul Yunupingu, formerly of Yothu Yindi, attained international success singing contemporary music in English and in one of the languages of the Yolngu people.

Successful Torres Strait Islander musicians include Christine Anu (pop) and Seaman Dan.

Contemporary Indigenous music continues the earlier traditions and also represents a fusion with contemporary mainstream styles of music, such as rock and country music. The Deadlys provide an illustration of this with rock, country, pop among the styles played. Traditional instruments such as the didjeridu and clapsticks are commonly used, giving the music a distinctive feel.

Country music has remained particularly popular among the Australian Aboriginal and Torres Strait Islander peoples for decades, as documented in Clinton Walker's seminal Buried Country. Tom Foster, Dougie Young and Jimmy Little were pioneers and Troy Cassar-Daley is among Australia's successful contemporary Indigenous performers of country music. Aboriginal artists Kev Carmody and Archie Roach employ a combination of folk-rock and country music to sing about Aboriginal rights issues, using the song type called barnt. The documentary, book and soundtrack Buried Country showcases significant Indigenous musicians from the 1940s to the 1990s.

The movie Wrong Side of the Road and its soundtrack (1981), highlighting Indigenous disadvantage in urban Australia, gave broad exposure to the bands Us Mob and No Fixed Address.

Australian hip hop music and rap music has a number of Aboriginal exponents, including the award-winning Baker Boy, 2019 Young Australian of the Year, who raps and sings in Yolngu Matha.

The genre-defying Mojo Juju has been nominated for or won several awards since 2018, and their music has been featured in a number of television shows including Underbelly: Razor, Underbelly: Squizzy and Roadtrip Nation.

Thelma Plum released her debut album, Better in Blak, in July 2019.

DOBBY is an Aboriginal/Filipino musician, mostly rapper and drummer, who has played with the Sydney band Jackie Brown Jr. As a member of the Murrawarri Republic, he sings in Murrawarri language as well as English, and is a political activist for Aboriginal issues.

The nephew of Dr M. Yunupiŋu and the son of Stuart Kellaway, both founding members of Yothu Yindi, started their own band, King Stingray, whose sound they call "Yolngu surf rock". Their first single, written by Yirrnga Yunupiŋu and Roy Kellaway, was released in October 2020.

In 2024, and at the age of 80, blues musician Kankawa Nagarra (Olive Knight)'s debut album, Wirlmarni, won the prestigious Australian Music Prize (AMP).

== Training institutions ==
The Centre for Aboriginal Studies in Music (CASM), founded in 1972, now exists as part of the National Centre for Aboriginal Language and Music Studies at the University of Adelaide, located within the Elder Conservatorium. While it has in the past (1980s) offered three-year diploma courses, as of 1993 it offers only a one-year foundation course, owing to funding cuts over the years. CASM has access to a state-of-the-art dedicated recording studio, along with teaching and practice rooms, a dance room, a keyboard suite, and computer suites. Notable alumni include the bands Coloured Stone, No Fixed Address, Kuckles, and Us Mob, as well as musicians Zaachariaha Fielding (of the duo Electric Fields), Ellie Lovegrove, Nathan May, Tilly Tjala Thomas, and Simi Vuata.

== See also ==
- 3KND community radio station, streaming on the internet and broadcasting in Melbourne and in Brisbane.
- Aboriginal rock music
- Buried Country, film and book about Indigenous country music
- Central Australian Aboriginal Media Association (CAAMA), organisation promoting Aboriginal music
- National Indigenous Music Awards
- Deadly Awards
- First Nations Media Australia, national peak body for Indigenous broadcasting, media and communications
- Indigenous Australian hip hop
- Stompen Ground, Broome
- Vibe Australia
- Skinnyfish Music
