= Blackfire (Australian band) =

Australian rock band

- Genres: Australian Indigenous
- Years active: 1992–2004, 2022–present
- Label: CAAMA Golden Robot Records
- Members: Grant Hansen; Brad Brown; Selwyn Burns; Daniel Jauregui; Rod Crundwell; David Leha; Peter Moore; Leonie Whyman; Monica McDonald
- Past members: Kutcha Edwards; Kelli McGuinness; Leroy Cummins; Corey Noll; Heath Ramzan; Paul hester

Blackfire were an Australian Indigenous band. They were formed in late 1992 and took a long break in 2004. The original members were Bradley Brown, Selwyn Burns, Kutcha Edwards, Grant Hansen and Kelli McGuinness. They released two albums, A Time to Dream (1994) and the Paul Hester produced Night Vision (1998). The band played spasmodically over the next few years but reformed with a new line up in 2023. They then released two new albums, Regeneration 2024 and Solar Eclipse 2025.

== History ==
Blackfire were formed in Melbourne in late 1992 by Bradley Brown (ex-Watbalimba, Interaction) on bass guitar, drums and vocals; Selwyn Burns (ex-Coloured Stone, Mixed Relations, No Fixed Address) on lead guitar and vocals; Kutcha Edwards on lead vocals, Grant Hansen (ex-Interaction, Mercury Blues) on rhythm guitar and vocals, and Kelli McGuinness (ex-Dr Koori, Interaction, Watbalimba) on drums, bass guitar, guitar and vocals. Their first album, A Time to Dream, was released in 1994 by Central Australian Aboriginal Media Association (CAAMA).

Leroy Cummins (ex-Christine Anu Band) joined the group on guitar in 1997 to expand the line-up, as did Corey Noll later on. Blackfire toured extensively throughout Australia before travelling to Asia (Japan, China and Taiwan), alongside Archie Roach and the Naroo Dancers. They recorded their second album, Night Vision (1998), with Paul Hester producing at his studio, the Lodge, in Melbourne. Hansen compared their two albums, "some different sounds and different range of music. I'd say that it's much more universal than the first album. The first one was about being Kooris living in the city. It was a full-on rock album. This one's much more about hope for the future. The style of songs is a bit different – they’re not as quick paced and rocked up, it's more mellow."

The Band reformed in the early 2020s, following the COVID-19 pandemic, with a new line up. David Leha on Lead Vocals, Rod Crundwell, Peter Moore, Daniel Jauregui, Leonie Whyman and Monica McDonald were added with original members Grant Hansen, Brad Brown, and Selwyn Burns.

== People ==
Kelli McGuinness is the son of activist Bruce McGuinness, who made two films associated with the band: Black Fire in 1972, and A Time to Dream in 1974.
