= Blackout (Australian TV show) =

Australian current affairs television show (1989–1995)

Blackout was an Australian current affairs program aimed at an Indigenous audience, that aired on ABC Television from 1989 to 1995. It varied in style, content, frequency, and length over the years.

The show addressed primarily the interests of Aboriginal and Torres Strait Islander people community, and was made by Indigenous Australians and produced by ABC-TV's Aboriginal unit from 1989 to 1994. Presenters included Malcolm Cole, Lillian Crombie, John Harding, Kylie Belling, Daryl Sibosado, Llew Cleaver, Clayton Lewis, Aaron Pedersen, and Michelle Tuahine.

The first four seasons aired weekly and focused mainly on current events affecting Aboriginal people, described by Canberra Times reporter as "a pretty heavy series" which was aired in "an inaccessible timeslot". The first series was launched on Friday 12 May 1989 at 10:40pm. The series of six programs was presented by Lillian Crombie, John Harding, and Malcolm Cole, and focused on controversial Aboriginal issues, as well as featuring music. The second series, comprising six shows, aired from Thursday 21 December 1989 at 8 pm. The program director was Aboriginal producer, director, writer, and actor Lorraine Mafi Williams, a veteran of the film industry since 1973, who had worked on films such as The Chant of Jimmie Blacksmith, The Last Wave, and The Fringe Dwellers.

On 24 January 1991 (two days before Australia Day), Blackout screened a special program to commemorate the original concert that led to the compilation album Building Bridges. With live music simulcast on Triple J featuring Midnight Oil, Yothu Yindi, Archie Roach, Mixed Relations, all-female band Mirror Mirror, Kev Carmody, and Crowded House, the special also included band members and members of the audience talking about the future of black/white relations in Australia. The program was produced by ABC TV in co-operation with the Building Bridges Association Inc.

The 5th series, which aired from 8 December 1992, aired three times a week at 10:40pm, and was geared towards a wider audience. It featured music, comedy and a lifestyle magazine on Tuesdays and Thursdays, and continued the weekly documentary on Wednesdays. was featured, and a sketch comedy called "The Land of the Oppressed White People". Its run was extended from six programs to 21, presented by radio announcer Clayton Lewis, and the new format allowed more Aboriginal directors, performers, and artists to showcase their work. Musicians such as Archie Roach, Mixed Relations, Bush Dokta, The Tiddas, Jimmy Little, and Kev Carmody were featured in this series.

The 6th series began airing in November 1993, in a new hour-long format was hosted and produced by Aaron Pedersen and Michelle Tuahine. Tuahine interviewed African American singing star Eartha Kitt in the first episode, and the Tiddas performed their new single, "Waiting".

The 7th series commenced on Tuesday 22 November 1994 on ABC TV, comprising 12 weekly half-hour episodes aired at the prime time of 9.30 pm. Three new reporters joined the team: Brisbane Broncos rugby league player, Wendell Sailor, reporting from Sydney and Brisbane; Michelle White, in Perth; and reporter/producer Barbara McCarthy-Grogan, formerly with ABC News Darwin. Each episode covered a number of themes, such as spirituality, family, culture, law, reconciliation, and love. Pedersen interviewed Neville Bonner in this series, while Sailor interviewed "new Aboriginal singing sensation" Leah Purcell, as well as athlete Cathy Freeman. The music segment continued, as well as "Face the Facts", presented by Michael Watson.
