= The Marngrook Footy Show =

2007–2019 Australian TV series

- Created by: Grant Hansen
- Directed by: Darcy Bonser
- Presented by: Grant Hansen; Gilbert McAdam; Leila Gurruwiwi; Shelley Ware
- Theme music composer: Grant Hansen; Ross Wilson
- Opening theme: It's Marngrook
- Country of origin: Australia
- Original language: English
- No. of seasons: 13
- No. of episodes: 299

Production
- Executive producer: Jay Estorninho
- Producer: Grant Hansen
- Running time: 90 minutes
- Production company: Toombak Indigenous Production

Original release
- Network: NITV (2007–11, 2013–2019); C31 (2007–10); ABC2 (2011–12)
- Release: July 2007 – September 2019

The Marngrook Footy Show was a sport panel show broadcast in Australia focusing on Australian rules football and aimed at Indigenous viewers. Debuting on television in 2007 after 10 years on radio, the show first aired on NITV and on Channel 31 Melbourne, moving to ABC2 during 2011 and 2012 before moving back to NITV. The show was cancelled in October 2019, replaced by Yokayi Footy in March 2020.

As of April 2021, the show continues as a weekly radio show on Saturday mornings on 3KND in Melbourne.

== Origins and format ==
Marn Grook ("game ball") is a name given to a range of traditional Aboriginal Australian recreational pastimes, which some historians claim had a role in the formation of Australian rules football.

The show is the brainchild of Grant Hansen, who was tired of the lack of Indigenous football commentators and hosts on the radio and TV. It first aired in 1997 as a radio show in Melbourne, and with popularity increasing it was soon beamed across the country via satellite the following year. The first radio show was hosted by Hansen and Alan Thorpe, with correspondents around the country including Derek Kickett, Michael McLean, Gilbert McAdam, Chris Johnson and Robert Ahmat.

After 10 years on the radio it was then developed as a television show and was shown in 2007 on C31 Melbourne and NITV. It featured interviews, weekly tips, AFL Gripes and live music performances, as well as including local stories from around the country featuring indigenous footballers talking about their backgrounds, origin clubs and towns, heritage and current affairs.

Between 2011 and 2012, the program was broadcast on ABC2, and was shown live in 2012, but had its time-slot moved several times. From 2013 the show was produced by Toombak Indigenous Productions and broadcast on NITV/SBS. The show was produced at the Burwood campus of Deakin University in its professional-standard television studio.

The show was cancelled in October 2019 after 12 years. In March 2020, it was replaced by Yokayi Footy.

== Hosts ==
=== Main ===
- Grant Hansen (2007–2019)
- Gilbert McAdam (2007–2019)
- Derek Kickett (2007–2008, 2018–2019)

=== Supporting ===
- Leila Gurruwiwi (2007–2019) (presenter)
- Shelley Ware (2010–2019) (presenter)
- Rohan Connolly (2017–2019) (presenter)
- Kevin Bartlett (2015–2019) (rotating panellist)
- Robert Walls (2016–2019) (rotating panellist)
- Doug Hawkins (2014–2019) (rotating panellist)
- Robert DiPierdomenico (2014–2019) (rotating panellist)
- Shaun Burgoyne (2014–2019) (rotating panellist)
- Ronnie Burns (2007–2013, 2018–2019)
- Phil Krakouer (2014–2019) (rotating panellist)
- Simon Madden (2017–2019) (rotating panellist)
- Alan Thorpe (2007–2012)
- Chris Johnson (2009–2016)

== Awards and nominations ==
Year	Award	Category	Recipients and nominees	Result	Refs.
2015	Logie Awards of 2015	Most Popular Sports Program	The Marngrook Footy Show	Nominated	
2016	Logie Awards of 2016	Best Sports Program	Marngrook Footy Show	Nominated	

== See also ==
- List of Australian television series
- List of programs broadcast by Special Broadcasting Service
- List of longest-running Australian television series
