= Warriappendi Secondary School =

School for Indigenous Australian students in Adelaide

Warriappendi Secondary School, founded as Moore Street Alternative School and renamed Warriappendi School in 1983, is a secondary school for Aboriginal and Torres Strait Islander students in western Adelaide, South Australia. Established in the early to mid 1980s by community members Leila Rankine and her sister Veronica Brodie, the school has undergone several moves. It opened its new building in Thebarton on 3 November 2025, at which time there are around 80 students enrolled. There is space for growth, to accommodate up to 150 students.

== History ==
In the 1960s and 1970s, teachers and parents found that mainstream South Australian schools were not suitable for all children, especially a large group of Aboriginal children who lived in the south-eastern corner of Adelaide city centre. Leila Rankine (1992–1993) and her sister Veronica Brodie (1941–2007) are regarded as the founders of the school as it was by their efforts that it was established. They also contributed to its ongoing development through subsequent moves.

The Department of Education rented a room from the Church of England in Moore street, at the location of the St Mary Magdalene's Church, which was called the South-East Corner School for a while. In mid-1980, a new school, the Moore Street Alternative School, was established on the site. This was a co-educational secondary school for Aboriginal and non-Aboriginal students who were not doing well in mainstream schools. Greg Winner was appointed as principal, and around 30 students enrolled at the school initially.

The building was in poor condition, so the Education Department obtained 25 Naldera Street in Glandore, which at different times in its history been the site of Edwardstown Girls Reformatory (1891–1898); Edwardstown Industrial School (1898–1949); Glandore Industrial School (1949–1958); Glandore Children's Home (1958–1966); renamed Glandore Boys' Home in 1966, eventually being closed on 4 February 1973. (Note: Now (2025) Glandore Community Centre.) Staff and programs were developed on this site.

A new home was found for it on the site of the Richmond Infant School on South Road, Marleston, in February 1983, when it was renamed Warriappendi. The school took on an Aboriginal focus, and the new name was chosen by the founders in association with Narungga man Peter Buckskin (Note: Formerly Dean of Aboriginal Engagement and Strategic Projects at the University of South Australia, as of 2025, chair of the South Australian Aboriginal Education and Training Consultative Committee and the Co-Chair of the National Aboriginal and Torres Strait Islander Education Corporation) and in consultation with Kaurna people. The word Warriappendi means "to seek" or "searching for" in the Kaurna language, and marked the first time that Kaurna people themselves had chosen ta Kaurna word for public naming purposes.

In February 2025, Warriappendi Secondary School relocated to a new site in Ann Nelson Drive, Thebarton, due to the River Torrens to Darlington road-building project.

== Description and governance ==
Warriappendi Secondary School is a high school for Aboriginal students, located at 7 Ann Nelson Drive, Thebarton. As of November 2025 around 80 students are enrolled at the school. As of 2025, Craig Bailey is principal of the school.

The school accommodates up to 150 students, and includes spaces for yarning, cultural learning, drama and music, as well as STEM laboratories, a library, a commercial kitchen, visual and digital arts spaces, and a 900-square-metre (9,700 sq ft) gymnasium.

== Building ==
The new building, which opened on 3 November 2025, was designed by JPE Design Studio and built by BADGE Constructions, in consultation with the school community and with employment of Aboriginal and Torres Strait Islander workers in mind.

A large mural, titled Foundation of the Future, was painted at the front entrance of the school by Aboriginal artist Scott Rathman. According to Rathman, the design "represents the school community's journey, recognising the foundations laid at the old school site that shape the present and building new foundations at the new site for future generations.. The central spiral symbolises continuous growth through learning with pathways reflecting the diverse journeys, all interconnected, strengthening our shared experiences and developing community...".

== Programs ==
At Warriappendi, a program was developed using sport to help students learn about their cultures and histories. This has been taken up by other schools, and the South Australian Aboriginal Sports Training Academy (SAASTA) was established in 2005. Warriappendi is a member of the academy.

== See also ==
- Tauondi Aboriginal College, an independent college in Port Adelaide
