= Dark Place (film) =

- Directed by: Kodie Bedford; Perun Bonser; Rob Braslin; Liam Phillips; Bjorn Stewart
- Written by: Kodie Bedford; Perun Bonser; Rob Braslin; Liam Phillips; Bjorn Stewart
- Cinematography: László Baranyai
- Edited by: Adrian Powers; Lawrie Silvestrin
- Music by: Jed Palmer
- Production companies: Australian Broadcasting Corporation; Noble Savage Pictures; Screen Australia
- Distributed by: One Eyed Films (UK)
- Release date: 2019
- Running time: 75 minutes
- Country: Australia
- Language: English

Dark Place is a 2019 Australian horror anthology film. The shorts in the film were written and directed by Indigenous filmmakers Kodie Bedford, Perun Bonser, Rob Braslin, Liam Phillips, and Bjorn Stewart. All five shorts centre on Aboriginal peoples and the long-reaching impact of colonialism in Australia.

== Synopsis ==
=== "Scout" (Kodie Bedford) ===
A group of Indigenous women have been kidnapped and forcibly sex-trafficked, however it seems like their captors may have darker plans for them. The women must try to not only escape, but also get their revenge against their white captors.

=== "Foe" (Liam Phillips) ===
After a tragic event upsets her life, Eleanor begins to experience strange sleeping habits. She decides to record her sleeping patterns, but begins to notice something even stranger happening.

=== "Vale Light" (Rob Braslin) ===
Forced to move after their last place caught on fire, Shae and her daughter Isabelle find themselves creeped out by their new neighbour Diane. While Diane initially seems friendly, it doesn't take long for her true, awful personality to emerge.

=== "The Shore" (Perun Bonser) ===
Selena finds herself mesmerised by a figure in the water that may or may not be a vampire.

=== "Killer Native" (Bjorn Stewart) ===
A British couple has travelled to Australia in hopes of finding a place to make their dream home. They do not expect it to be easy, but they did not expect to find themselves hunted.

== Cast ==
- Nelson Baker as Jamie
- Katherine Beckett as Scout
- Shakira Clanton as Jodie
- Bernard Curry as Barry
- Jolie Everett as Isabelle
- Charlie Garber as Thomas
- Luka May Glynn-Cole as Selena
- Sara Pensalfini as Diane
- Clarence Ryan as Blackfella
- Tamala Shelton as Andy
- Hugh Sheridan as Mike
- Lily Sullivan as Sally
- Josh Quong Tart as Doctor
- Natasha Wanganeen as Ghoul
- Leonie Whyman as Elena
- Tasia Zalar as Shae
- Nicholas Hope as Boss
- Clarence Ryan as Blackfella

== Production ==
Filming for the shorts took place largely in 2018. All of the shorts are directed by indigenous filmmakers and deal with the topic of how colonialism has impacted the Aboriginal populations in Australia. Directors Kodie Bedford and Bjorn Stewart commented upon their creative process in an article for the Special Broadcasting Service. Stewart commented that creating a film about "blackfella zombies" had been a desire of his ever since he saw Dawn of the Dead, the 2004 remake of the 1978 film by the same name. For her short, "Scout", Bedford wanted to make it both female-centric and empowering. She has described it as "the black Kill Bill" and that it “is about exploring females, in particular, Aboriginal females who are exploited in society and they're finding their place in the world”.

== Release ==
Dark Place had its world premiere during August 2019, at the Sydney Film Festival. It later had its Canadian premiere on 24 October 2019 at the imagineNATIVE Film + Media Arts Festival, where it screened at the TIFF Bell Lightbox in Toronto, Ontario.

== Reception ==
Dark Place has a rating of 100% on Rotten Tomatoes, based on nine reviews. Common elements of praise centered upon the themes presented in the anthology, as well as the choice of shorts. SciFiNow commented that "It’s never an easy task putting together a range of shorts in this format and finding the desired outcome, but with a lean running time of 75 mins, Dark Place provides an enjoyable and intriguing variety of themes and genres."

The Alliance of Women Film Journalists commented upon the themes of colonialism, writing "Scout typifies what it is that largely makes Dark Place so special; the directors of this anthology understand the power of horror to address real issues in a contemporary Australia haunted by an ugly and at times terrifying colonial past." Starburst held similar opinions and noted that the last short, "Killer Native", was "a high point, despite being tonally out of sorts compared to what has come before."

== Killer Native feature film ==
In May 2020 Screen Australia announced that it would fund eleven feature films, one of which would be a feature-length adaptation of Bjorn Stewart's "Killer Native", entitled Invasion of the Killer Natives. The film will be produced by Noble Savage Pictures' Majhid Heath and Hayley Johnson, who also worked on Dark Place.
