= JPE Design Studio =

Architectural firm based in Adelaide, Australia

Practice information
- Founders: Daniel Garlick
- Founded: 1851; 175 years ago
- Location: Adelaide, South Australia

Significant works and honors
- Buildings: Adelaide Aquatic Centre; Mayfair Hotel; The Wave; Margaret Tobin Centre; Thebarton Theatre
- Awards: Thorndon Park Playground, National Award of Excellence for Playspace; 'The Nest', Kidsafe - National Playspace Award

Website
- www.jpe.com.au/

JPE Design Studio is an architectural firm based in Adelaide, South Australia. Tracing its origins to 1851 and its founder, Daniel Garlick, the firm is Australia's oldest surviving continuously operating architectural practice. It offers architecture, interior design, landscape architecture and urban design services, and has been responsible for the design of many of Adelaide's most recognisable buildings and outdoor public spaces.

== History ==
The biographies of many architects associated with JPE Design Studios and its predecessor firms are included on the Architects of South Australia database. These include:

- Daniel Garlick (1818–1902) - founder and prominent architect during the establishment and development of the colony of South Australia.
- Thomas English (1819–1884)
- George Abbott (1794–1869)
- William McMinn (1844–1884)
- Rowland Rees (1840–1904)
- George Soward (1857–1941)
- Arthur Garlick (1862–1901)
- Sydney Jackman (1878–1944) - After Jackman's death, the practice was renamed Garlick and Jackman and Gooden in 1945.
- H.M. Jackman (1897–1968)
- H.L. Jackman (1867–1936)
- Lance Gooden (1898–1987)
- George Parker (1918–2007)
- Earle Scott (1924–2012)
- Adrian Evans - In 2002, Evans joined Jackman Gooden Architects as a director, and the practice was renamed Jackman Parken Evans.

From the time of its foundation in 1851, the architectural practice's partners and name changed many times. The firm has been known as JPE Design Studio since 2008, an abbreviation of Jackman Parken Evans Design Studio. It is South Australia's (and Australia's) oldest surviving continuous architectural design firm.

As of March 2026, the current directors at JPE Design Studios are Josephine Evans, Sharon Mackay, Simon Dodd and Tom Vinall.

== Notable projects ==
Recent projects with which JPE Design Studio has been associated include:

- Adelaide Aquatic Centre
- Mayfair Hotel redevelopment, 41-49 King William Street, Adelaide
- The Edge, King William Street and The Wave, Gilles Street, Adelaide
- Margaret Tobin Centre, Bedford Park
- New Learning Centre at Adelaide High School
- Pridham Hall at the University of Adelaide (in collaboration with Snøhetta)
- Thebarton Theatre
- Warriappendi Secondary School (2025)

== Awards ==
JPE Design Studio has received multiple awards from the Australian Institute of Landscape Architects and the Australian Institute of Architects, amongst others.

At the 2025 South Australian Architecture Awards, JPE Design Studio received a commendation in the Sustainable Architecture category for the Ngutungka Henley project, a combined library and community centre.

In 2023, the Thorndon Park Reserve Playground won the National Award of Excellence for Play Spaces.

At the 2018 South Australian Landscape Architecture Awards, 'The Nest' at Alberton Primary School was awarded the Play Spaces Landscape Architecture Award.

== Gallery ==
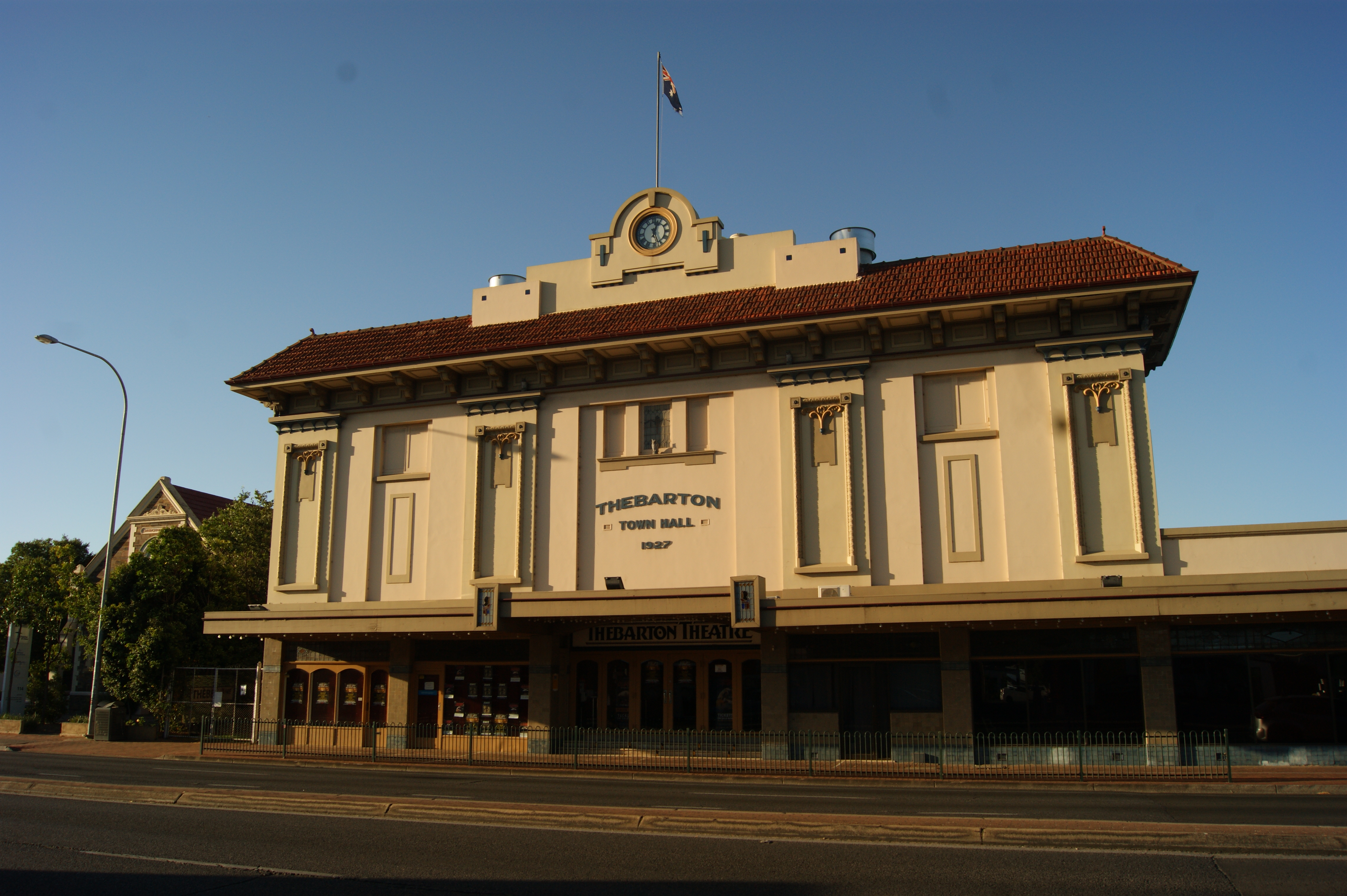
Thebarton Theatre, Torrensville, South Australia

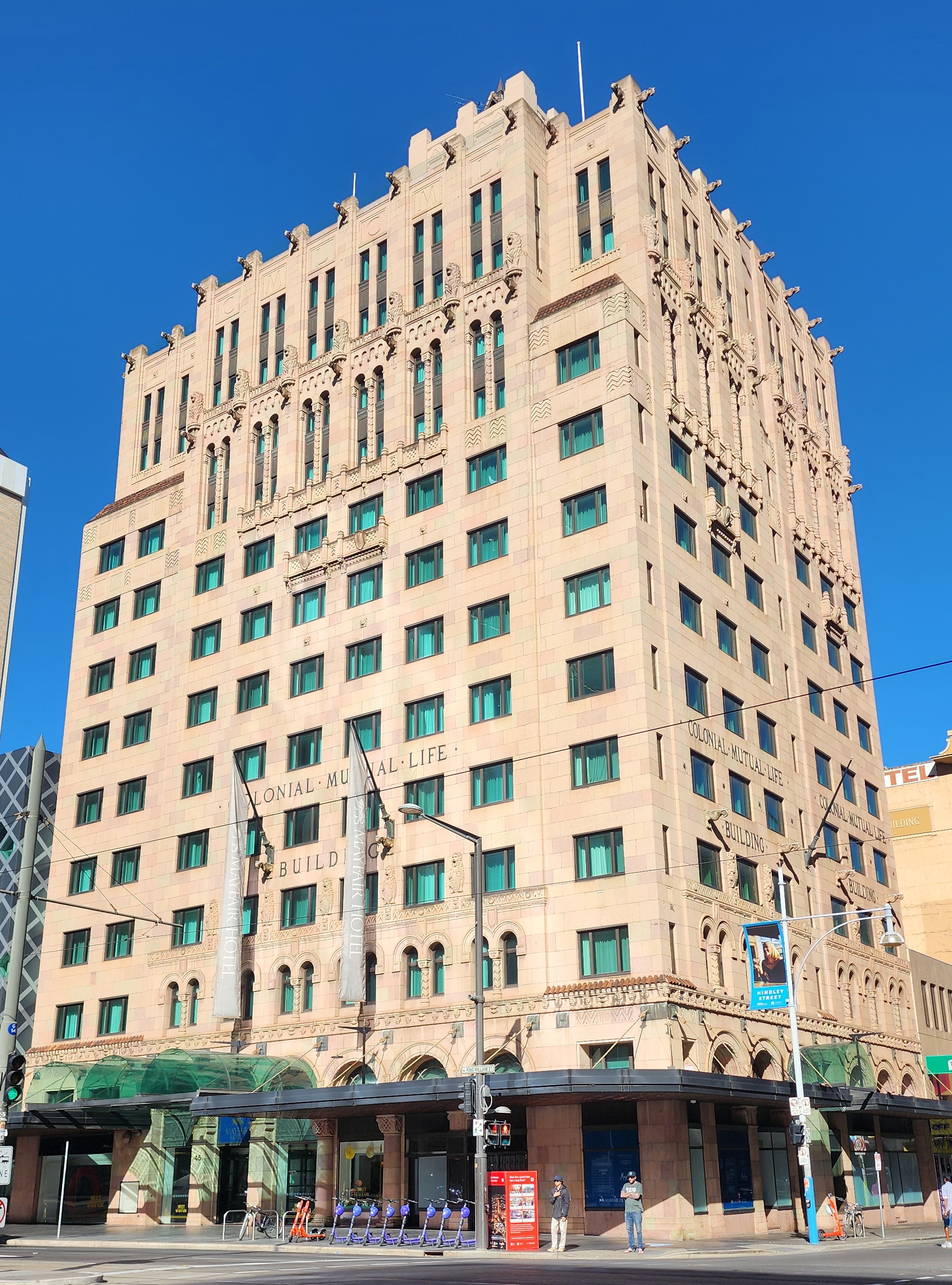
Mayfair Hotel, Adelaide
