= Wendy Stites =

Australian costume and production designer

- Born: 1949 (age 76–77)
- Other names: Wendy Weir
- Occupations: Costume designer; production designer
- Spouse: Peter Weir (m. 1966)
- Children: 2

Wendy Stites (born 1949), also known as Wendy Weir, is an Australian retired costume designer and production designer, best known for her frequent collaborations with director Peter Weir. Her accolades include an AACTA Award and a BAFTA Award, in addition to a nomination for an Academy Award.

== Personal life ==
In 1966, Stites married filmmaker Peter Weir. Together they had two children, Ingrid and Julian.

== Filmography ==
Year	Title	Director	Credited as		Notes
Year	Title	Director	Costume Designer	Production Designer	Notes
1975	Picnic at Hanging Rock	Peter Weir	Associate	No	
1979	The Plumber	Peter Weir	No	Yes	Credited as Wendy Weir; Television film
1981	Gallipoli	Peter Weir	No	No	Credited as Wendy Weir; Design coordinator
1982	The Year of Living Dangerously	Peter Weir	No	No	Credited as Wendy Weir; Design coordinator
1985	Witness	Peter Weir	No	No	Credited as Wendy Weir; Associate producer
1989	Dead Poets Society	Peter Weir	No	Yes	
1990	Green Card	Peter Weir	No	Yes	
1993	Fearless	Peter Weir	No	No	Special design consultant
1998	The Truman Show	Peter Weir	No	No	Special design consultant
2003	Master and Commander: The Far Side of the World	Peter Weir	Yes	No	
2010	The Way Back	Peter Weir	Yes	No	

== Awards and nominations ==
Awards
Year	Film	Award / ceremony	Category	Result	Ref.
1981	Gallipoli	23rd Australian Film Institute Awards	Best Achievement in Art Direction (shared with Herbert Pinter)	Won	
1981	Gallipoli	23rd Australian Film Institute Awards	Best Achievement in Costume Design (shared with Terry Ryan)	Nominated	
1982	The Year of Living Dangerously	25th Australian Film Institute Awards	Best Achievement in Production Design (shared with Herbert Pinter)	Nominated	
2003	Master and Commander: The Far Side of the World	76th Academy Awards	Best Costume Design	Nominated	
2003	Master and Commander: The Far Side of the World	57th British Academy Film Awards	Best Costume Design	Won	
2003	Master and Commander: The Far Side of the World	8th Golden Satellite Awards	Best Costume Design	Nominated	
