= Sequin in a Blue Room =

2019 Australian coming-of-age independent drama film

- DVD cover
- Directed by: Samuel Van Grinsven
- Written by: Samuel Van Grinsven; Jory Anast
- Produced by: Sophie Hattch
- Starring: Conor Leach; Simon Croker; Anthony Brandon Wong; Jeremy Lindsay Taylor
- Cinematography: Jay Grant
- Edited by: Tim Guthrie
- Music by: Brent Williams
- Production companies: Sequin in a Blue Room; AFTRS
- Distributed by: Peccadillo Pictures
- Release date: 14 June 2019 (Sydney Film Festival)
- Running time: 83 minutes
- Country: Australia
- Language: English
- Budget: $45,000
- Box office: $12,872

Sequin in a Blue Room is a 2019 Australian independent queer coming-of-age, mystery and drama film directed by Samuel Van Grinsven, in his feature film debut. It was written by Van Grinsven and Jory Anast. The film stars Conor Leach in his feature film debut, Simon Croker, Anthony Brandon Wong and Jeremy Lindsay Taylor. It had its world premiere on 14 June 2019 at the Sydney Film Festival, where it won an award for Best Narrative Feature, and was released in theatres in August 2020. The film received generally wide acclaim, and American review aggregator Rotten Tomatoes certified the film fresh with a score of 92%. It was filmed on location in Sydney.

== Plot ==
Sixteen year old Sequin is queer and comfortable with his sexuality and has a healthy relationship with his father. He prefers anonymous and unconditional sexual encounters over having a serious and meaningful relationship. Sequin meets his one-night-stands through a dating app, and quickly ghosts them after their sexual liaison, in order to remain emotionally detached. But that all changes when he has a sexual encounter with B, a much older married man, who becomes obsessed with him and wants to meet up with him again. Back in school, he is asked out on a traditional date by Tommy who has a crush on him, and Sequin accepts. When Sequin gets invited by D to a group sex party at 'The Blue Room', B spots him and begins chasing him, until he is suddenly rescued by Edward, who he then has sex with. Immediately afterwards, Edward leaves telling Sequin to find him "out there", but he doesn't know who he is or anything about him, so he decides to track him down. After returning home from the sex party, Tommy arrives for their date, but Sequin has forgotten about it and blows him off. The next day he hesitantly reconnects with B, and has sex with him again in order to steal his phone to look for clues about The Blue Room. But after his wife keeps on calling the phone now in Sequin's possession, B starts stalking Sequin and pursuing him in order to get his phone back. Later, Sequin finds some contacts in the phone which lead him to an encounter with Virginia, a drag queen, who he ends up getting high with. Sequin is so wasted that he doesn't go home, and his dad gets mad and messages him that he has been kicked out. Near the end, he gets tricked into returning to The Blue Room based on false information on how to find Edward, but when he arrives, he is ambushed by B who savagely beats him. Having nowhere to go, he returns to Virginia's place, where he nurses his wounds, and they end up discussing his obsession with finding Edward. Virginia reveals information that leads to Sequin finally finding Edward, but when he follows him home, he discovers that Edward is in a relationship already. In the end, he reconciles with his dad and goes home, and the final scene shows Sequin and Tommy in his room watching Twilight together.

== Cast ==
- Conor Leach as Sequin
- Simon Croker as Tommy
- Anthony Brandon Wong as Virginia
- Jeremy Lindsay Taylor as Dad
- Samuel Barrie as Edward
- Joshua Shediak as A
- Ed Wightman as B
- Patrick Cullen as C
- Damian de Montemas as D
- Tsu Shan Chambers as Teacher
- Darren Kumar as Henry
- Nancy Denis as Ari

== Production notes ==
In an interview with The Queer Review, Van Grinsven said that many of the storylines in the film were directly based on his own coming-of-age experiences, and his film was also influenced by New Queer Cinema, and the early works of Gregg Araki and Gus Van Sant. He also revealed that the movie was his graduate work from Australian Film, Television and Radio School, so it was filmed on a meager budget of only $45,000. Van Grinsven said the colour blue was almost entirely removed from the film; the outside scenes had no blue skies, and it was not visible in the costumes, set design and grading. He wanted to reserve it for the scene in 'The Blue Room', where the anonymous group sex party takes place. His reasoning for excluding the colour was to explore the effect it had on the audience when a certain colour is withheld and then you are suddenly immersed in it.

Van Grinsven disclosed that Conor Leach was cast in the role of Sequin in a very unconventional way. Having no track record at filmmaking, a lot of agents and actors were reluctant to work with him. Leach had no prior film experience, but his agent sent Van Grinsven an email about Conor anyway, and he asked for an audition tape. He only watched the first two lines of Leach's tape, and said he knew "in an instant that he captured the self-awareness, quiet confidence, and the cunning energy of the character". After meeting with him in person, he was offered the role on the spot. Simon Croker who appears in the film as Tommy, a love interest of Sequin, is an alumnus of Australian Film, Television and Radio School, along with the film's producer, editor and cinematographer.

== Release ==
The film had its world premiere in June 2019 at the Sydney Film Festival, where it won an award for Best Narrative Feature. It had additional film festival screenings at the Australian Academy of Cinema and Television Arts and Oldenburg International Film Festival, where it received two nominations respectively for Best Film. The movie had a limited theatrical release in August 2020, and grossed $12,872 at the box office.

== Critical reception ==
Harry Windsor of The Hollywood Reporter gave it a positive review, saying actor Conor Leach is "quietly riveting at the film's centre" and overall the film is an "auspicious feature debut...and upholstered by an impressive command of good old-fashioned craft" by director Samuel Van Grinsven. Peter Sobczynski from RogerEbert.com said the film "moves with a confidence and style that keeps you hooked throughout", and said Leach gives an "impressive performance". Overall, Sobczynski rated the film. Peter Debruge writes that director Van Grinsven "opts not to dwell on the cautionary side of his striking 21st-century coming-of-age fable", and the film expertly "blends elements of fantasy and thriller", for a generally "illuminating" experience. Gary Kramer wrote in his review for Gay City News that director Van Grinsven is definitely talented, "but despite its potential, this intriguing coming-of-age film never quite excites". However, Kramer did note that the cinematography is "gorgeously lensed" by Jay Grant.

The Guardian said that although coming-of-age stories are not at all uncommon, Van Grinsven directs this film with "lustre and style", and praised the performance of Leach as a "silky, feline presence who owns every moment that he's on screen". Tara Brady from The Irish Times, along with several other film reviewers, (Note: The Hollywood Reporter, RogerEbert.com, Variety, Gay City News, British Film Institute, Metro Weekly and The Queer Review) commented on the opening title card: "A Homosexual Film by Samuel Van Grinsven", comparing it to Gregg Arakis films, who introduced his movies in a similar fashion like The Living End and The Doom Generation, and citing Araki as an influence on Van Grinsven's directorial debut. Brady also noted that "this clever, compelling project was completed as the director's masters project". Alex Davidson from the British Film Institute said the absence of women in the film is noticeable, but you don't ever see Van Grinsen directly address that absence. In conclusion, Davidson said the film "is a riveting and constantly surprising debut...and all the performances are strong".

Randy Shulman from Metro Weekly said that while the film is visually appealing, the narrative is a little thin, but actor Conor Leach makes the film worthwhile, saying his performance was "magnificent, multi-layered, and a canny mix of sensuality, teenage cockiness, vulnerability and, when needed, utter panic". The London Times also praised Leach's performance, but criticised the ending.

Rotten Tomatoes certified the film fresh with a score of 92%, with the critics consensus saying the film "proves the coming-of-age genre still has fresh stories to tell and establishes debuting director Samuel Van Grinsven as a strikingly talented filmmaker."

== Accolades ==
- Sydney Film Festival (winner Audience Award Best Narrative Feature)
- Australian Academy of Cinema and Television Arts (nominee Best Indie Film) in the AACTA Awards
- Australian Directors Guild Awards (nominee Best Direction in a Feature Film)
- Oldenburg International Film Festival (nominee Best Film)
