= Indigenous Literacy Foundation =

Australian charity

- Predecessor: Indigenous Literacy Project
- Formation: 2011
- Founder: Suzy Wilson
- Type: Nonprofit
- Purpose: literacy for Indigenous children and young people
- Headquarters: Ultimo, New South Wales, Australia
- Co-Chairperson: Marnie O'Bryan
- Co-Chairperson: Tony Dreise
- Key people: Ben Bowen, Chief Executive Officer; Mike Milnes, Chief Operating Officer
- Awards: Astrid Lindgren Memorial Award, 2024
- Website: https://www.indigenousliteracyfoundation.org.au

The Indigenous Literacy Foundation (ILF) is an Australian not-for-profit founded in 2011 that works to address the educational disadvantages faced by Indigenous Australian children and young people by providing access to books and literacy programs.

ILF was set up in 2011, taking over from the Indigenous Literacy Project (ILP) which had been associated with The Fred Hollows Foundation. In 2010 the ILP had raised $607,000. Juliet Rogers, formerly CEO of Murdoch Books, was the inaugural chair.

Patrons of the ILF, as of 2021, are Quentin Bryce AD CVO (appointed February 2015) and June Oscar AO (appointed September 2019).

Lifetime ambassadors of the ILF include Justine Clarke, Andy Griffiths, Kate Grenville, Anita Heiss, Alison Lester, David Malouf, Shelley Ware and Josh Pyke.

In September 2021 Karen Williams, who had been member of the ILP and executive director of the ILF, stepped down and was replaced by Ben Bowen as Chief Executive Officer, with Mike Milnes appointed Chief Operating Officer.

The ILF won the Astrid Lindgren Memorial Award in 2024. It was one of several Australian nominees for this award in both 2021 and 2022.

== Indigenous Literacy Day ==
Each year, the ILF organises and promotes Indigenous Literacy Day, held on Wednesday in the first week of September. The day is meant for raising awareness of literacy in remote Aboriginal and Torres Strait Islander communities, as well as celebrating Indigenous stories, languages and cultures.

== Mentorship programs ==
The ILF runs three programs for young First Nations people to create and publish books.

The Creative Initiative program is for high school students, and involves a three-to-five day workshop in which students write, illustrate and publish their own book.

The Pamela Lofts Bequest Workshop assists young First Nations people from remote communities in Western Australia and the Northern Territory to travel to Sydney, New South Wales, for a week-long art workshop. Pamela Lofts was an Australian children's book illustrator who left a significant bequest to the ILF when she died in 2012.

In 2025, the ILF launched the Talent Pathways program, for 17-to-24 year old First Nations young people from remote communities who are not presently in education or training. Four young creatives are chosen to participate every two years, to learn and gain experience in publishing, graphic design or writing, as preparation for their future careers.
