= Stompen Ground =

Music and art festival at Broome, Western Australia

Stompem Ground Festival is a contemporary and traditional music, dance, art exhibitions and ancestral storytelling festival in Broome, in the Kimberley region of Western Australia. Stompem is an Aboriginal and Torres Strait Islander owned, designed and managed arts and cultural festival. It was created by Mark Bin Baker.

The festival includes:

- Music development workshops
- Battle of the bands
- Country music night
- Dance forums & traditional dance presentations
- Book launches

== See also ==
- Garma Festival of Traditional Cultures
- Indigenous Australian music
- Survival Festival
