= Kutcha Edwards =

- Born: 1965 (age 60–61); Balranald, New South Wales, Australia
- Occupation: Singer-songwriter
- Years active: 1991–present
- Website: www.kutcha-edwards.com

Kutcha Edwards (born 1965) is an Aboriginal Australian singer and songwriter. He is known as a former member of the band Blackfire during the 1990s. More recently, he has fronted the Kutcha Edwards Band, and is part of The Black Arm Band. He has been nominated for several Music Victoria Awards, and was inducted into the Hall of Fame in the 2023 Music Victoria Awards. He won the Melbourne Prize for Music in 2016.

== Early life and education ==
Kutcha Edwards was born in Balranald, New South Wales in 1965. A survivor of the Stolen Generations, he was removed from his parents at the age of 18 months. He is a Mutti Mutti man.

== Career ==
Edwards' music career began in 1991 as a member of the band Watbalimba. He later joined the band Blackfire who he was with during the 1990s.

He contributed lyrics to a revised version of "Advance Australia Fair"-collaborating with Judith Durham, and singing the anthem not only with her, but also in a solo version.

He released his third album, Blak & Blu, in October 2012. It was produced by Craig Pilkington and features Jeff Lang as well as guest appearances by Dan Sultan, Rebecca Barnard, and others.

Edwards now fronts the Kutcha Edwards Band and is part of The Black Arm Band.

== On television ==
Edwards has appeared as a guest on the SBS TV series RocKwiz.

Kutcha's Koorioke, a docu-series about Edwards made for NITV, was directed and co-produced by John Harvey and Anna Grieve. It ran for two series, in 2019 and 2022. Each series consists of 10 episodes of 6 or 7 minutes, and several other actors and musicians feature in the series, including Jack Charles, Shiralee Hood, Elaine Crombie, Dan Sultan, Archie Roach, Emily Wurramara, Alice Skye, Bunna Lawrie, and Bart Willoughby.

== Discography ==
=== Albums ===
List of albums, with selected details
Title	Details
Cooinda	Released: 2001; Format: CD; Label: Kutcha Edwards (KE1)
Hope	Released: 2007; Format: CD; Label: Sound Vault Records (SV0578)
Blak & Blu	Released: 2012; Format: CD, Digital; Label: MGM
Beneath the Surface	Released: 2015; Format: CD, Digital; Label: MGM
Circling Time	Released: 2021; Format: CD; Label: Wantok Musik (W0030)
Warta-Kiki: Come Together (with Melbourne Youth Orchestra)	Released: February 2026; Format: digital, LP; Label: ABC Music

== Awards and nominations ==
Edwards was named Indigenous Person of the Year at the 2001 NAIDOC Awards and won a Deadly for Male Artist of the Year in the same year.

In 2016, Edwards was awarded the Melbourne Prize for Music and Distinguished Musicians Fellowship

=== Environmental Music Prize ===
The Environmental Music Prize is a quest to find a theme song to inspire action on climate and conservation. It commenced in 2022.

Year	Nominee / work	Award	Result	Ref.
2023	"Singing Up Country"	Environmental Music Prize	Nominated	

=== Music Victoria Awards ===
The Music Victoria Awards are an annual awards night celebrating Victorian music. They commenced in 2006.

Year	Nominee / work	Award	Result	Ref.
2013	Kutcha Edwards	Best Indigenous Act	Nominated	
2014	Kutcha Edwards	Best Indigenous Act	Nominated	
2016	Kutcha Edwards	Best Indigenous Act	Nominated	
2022	Kutcha Edwards	Soul, Funk, RNB & Gospel Work	Nominated	
2023	Kutcha Edwards	Hall of Fame	awarded	
