= New Gold Mountain (TV series) =

Australian drama series on 19th century Chinese migration to the Ballarat goldfields

- Genre: Drama
- Created by: Peter Cox
- Written by: Peter Cox; Yolanda Ramke; Benjamin Law; Greg Waters; Pip Karmel
- Directed by: Corrie Chen
- Starring: Yoson An; Alyssa Sutherland; Christopher James Baker; Sam Wang; Mabel Li; Chris Masters Mah; Leonie Whyman; Rhys Muldoon; Alison Bell; Dan Spielman
- Composer: Caitlin Yeo
- Country of origin: Australia
- Original languages: English, Cantonese
- No. of seasons: 1
- No. of episodes: 4

Production
- Executive producers: Kylie du Fresne; Rosemary Blight; Ben Grant
- Producers: Elisa Argenzio; Peter Cox; Liam Heyen
- Cinematography: Matthew Temple
- Running time: 55 minutes
- Production company: Goalpost Television

Original release
- Network: SBS
- Release: 13 October – 21 October 2021

New Gold Mountain is an Australian four-part drama miniseries which premiered on 13 October 2021 on SBS.

== Synopsis ==
In 1855, not long after the Eureka Stockade, the body of murdered white woman is found near a Chinese mining camp in the Ballarat Goldfields. Head of the camp, Leung Wei Shing is concerned that white authorities will blame the Chinese, while Indigenous worker Hattie is worried the local Indigenous mob will be held accountable. Several people vow to discover the truth, including Irish miner Patrick and recently widowed Belle Roberts.

== Cast ==
=== Main ===
- Yoson An as Leung Wei Shing
- Alyssa Sutherland as Belle Roberts
- Christopher James Baker as Patrick Thomas
- Sam Wang as Leung Wei Sun
- Mabel Li as Zhang Lei
- Chris Masters Mah as Gok
- Leonie Whyman as Hattie
- Rhys Muldoon as Commissioner Wright
- Alison Bell as Clara Wright
- Dan Spielman as Frederick Standish

=== Supporting ===
- Samuel Gaskin as Daniel Carney
- Sebastian Li as Chen
- Maria Angelico as Annie Thomas
- Freya Stafford as Rosie
- Travis Cotton as Frank Harken
- James Lau as Ah Chau
- John Orcsik as Gregor
- Li Weng as Mong Jun
- Mark Mitchell as Linus Cummins
- Paul Ireland as Ramsey
- Darcy Kent as Burke
- Conor Leach as Price
- Zach Blampied as Tom (Durrumang)
- Richard Davies as Earle

== Production ==
The miniseries is a Goalpost Television production which was created by Peter Cox, directed by Corrie Chen and executive produced by Kylie du Fresne.

Major production investment was provided by Screen Australia. The series was financed with support from Film Victoria and Screen NSW, with all3media International as global partner.

=== Filming locations ===
The series was filmed in Sovereign Hill, around the city of Melbourne and in regional Victoria.

== Release ==
The series premiered on SBS on 13 October 2021. Following the series finale on 21 October, SBS aired a half-hour special, New Gold Mountain Unwrapped, about the making of the series.

== Reception ==
Matt Neal from the ABC reviewed the series, saying: "It is a beautifully realised world... using the backdrops of Ballarat's Sovereign Hill... and an array of excellent costumes and sets that convey a vivid sense of time and place" and "For the most part, New Gold Mountain is a deeply satisfying series that, dare I say it, strikes gold by digging up a rich vein of new perspectives in well-trodden territory."

Katrina Trinh of Harper's Bazaar said: "Though with themes of class, immigration and race at its core, New Gold Mountain is not just an emblem of injustices and discriminatory policies. The series is a powerful exploration of the tensions between family and a cinematic portrait of daughters."

Eric Jiang of Screen Hub gave the series four stars, saying: "New Gold Mountain is a captivating achievement that centres on Chinese-Australian characters fighting to make their way in an unforgiving world. Though dense at times, the show has an exciting sense of place, wonderful performances, and steadily builds towards a rewarding conclusion."

== Awards ==
Year	Award	Category	Result	Ref.
2021	AWGIE Awards	Best Miniseries or Telemovie	Won	
2021	AACTA Awards	Best Costume Design in Television (Episode 1: "Propriety" – Cappi Ireland)	Won	
2021	AACTA Awards	Best Original Music Score in Television (Episode 1: "Propriety" – Caitlin Yeo)	Won	
2021	AACTA Awards	Best Miniseries or Telefeature	Nominated	
2021	AACTA Awards	Best Production Design in Television (Paddy Reardon)	Nominated	
2022	Equity Ensemble Awards	Outstanding Performance by an Ensemble in a Miniseries /Telemovie	Won	
2022	APDG Awards	Best Costume Design (Cappi Ireland)	Won	
2022	Logie Awards	Most Outstanding Miniseries	Nominated	
2022	Logie Awards	Silver Logie Award for Most Outstanding Supporting Actress	Nominated	

== See also ==
List of Australian television series
