= Conor Leach =

Australian actor

Conor Leach is an Australian actor who starred in Sequin in a Blue Room (2019). He grew up in Brisbane and graduated from the Victorian College of the Arts, Melbourne with a degree in theater in 2017.

He has also appeared in television series New Gold Mountain (2021) and Preacher (2019).

In 2022 Leach starred in Fourteen, a play about a teenager growing up in Queensland.
