= Leonie Whyman =

Australian actress

- Born: Newcastle, New South Wales, Australia
- Other name: LEO
- Occupations: Actress, musician
- Years active: 2011–present

Leonie Whyman is an Australian actress and musician. She has appeared in the television series New Gold Mountain and Deadloch. She also performs music under the stage name LEO as a solo artist, and is part of the Australian band Blackfire.

== Early life and education ==
Leonie Whyman is from Newcastle, New South Wales. She is part of the Paakantji nation from her grandfather's side of the family, and the Wiradjuri nation from her grandmother's side. She is an only child.

Whyman attended a performing arts high school, where she originally majored in trumpet before switching to guitar and vocals, due to being inspired by her father's musical background. She began acting on television during high school, and had to drop out of school during her last year for one of her acting jobs.

== Acting career ==
Whyman's first major role was in two 2011 episodes of the ABC3 series My Place, portraying Waruwi, a young Indigenous girl living in 1788. In 2012 and 2013, she appeared in two episodes of Redfern Now.

In 2015, Whyman acted in a main role on the teen drama series Ready For This. She played Lily, a high school student with a talent for school debating, dealing with grief after her mother's death.

In 2017, she appeared in Dance Academy: The Movie, a film based on the TV show Dance Academy. She also appeared in a short film titled Brown Lips in the same year. In 2018 starred in a short film, FOE, as part of the Dark Place horror anthology film.

Whyman had another major role in New Gold Mountain (2021), a historical drama series set during the gold rush in Victoria during the 19th century. In the miniseries, she played Hattie, a young Indigenous tracker. In 2022, Whyman had roles in the Australian-New Zealand film We Are Still Here, and the Australian TV series Mystery Road: Origin.

Whyman acted in the first season of the Australian black comedy crime series Deadloch in 2023. She and Kartanya Maynard played a pair of teenagers from a small Tasmanian town who become embroiled in a murder mystery. The two First Nations characters have their own subplot in the show.

She starred in the short film It Will Find You in 2024 and appeared in the Lords of the Soil in 2025.

In 2026, Whyman acted in the miniseries Goolagong, about the famous Australian tennis player Evonne Goolagong Cawley. She portrayed Goolagong's older sister, Barbara. She also starred in the short film G.O.A.T. as Lilah, a young queer woman living in Broome, Western Australia. The short premiered at the Melbourne International Film Festival in August 2026.

Whyman has also appeared in guest roles in Black Comedy.

== Music career ==
Whyman writes and sings music in several genres, often performing under the stage name "LEO". She performed in Melbourne for NAIDOC week in 2026.

In addition to her solo career, Whyman is a member of the Australian band Blackfire. In the early 2020s, following the band's return from a long hiatus and the release of their third album, Regeneration, Whyman and another musician, Monica McDonald, were inducted into the band to provide backing vocals and play percussion. They released a new album titled Solar Eclipse in 2025. The band is based in Naarm (Melbourne) and is affiliated with Golden Robot Records.

== Filmography ==
=== Film ===
Year	Title	Role	Notes
2017	Brown Lips	Keira	Short film
2017	Dance Academy: The Movie	Student Tilly	Credited as "Leonie Joy Whyman"
2018	Dark Place	Elena	Anthology film; segment: "Foe"
2022	We Are Still Here	Janet	Anthology film
2024	It Will Find You	Jackie	
2025	Lords of the Soil	Gira	
2026	G.O.A.T	Lilah	Short film

=== Television ===
Year	Title	Role	Notes
2011	My Place	Waruwi	2 episodes
2012–2013	Redfern Now	Selene	2 episodes
2015	Ready For This	Lily Carney	Main cast; 13 episodes
2016	Black Comedy	Guest roles	
2021	New Gold Mountain	Hattie	Miniseries; (all) 4 episodes
2022	Mystery Road: Origin	Cissy	
2023	Deadloch	Tammy Hampson	Season 1; 8 episodes
2026	Goolagong	Barbara	Miniseries; 2 episodes
