= Tom Foster (musician) =

Tharawal Aboriginal musician

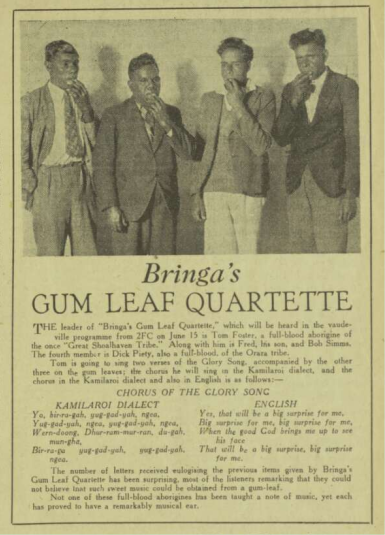
- Fred Foster, Tom Foster, Bob Simms & Dick Petty 1932 Bringa's Gum Leaf Quartet
- Born: Tom Foster; 1870; New South Wales, Australia
- Died: December 1940 (aged 69–70); Kingsford, New South Wales
- Musical career
- Genres: spiritual
- Occupations: Performer; musician; accordion player
- Instruments: Vocals, accordion

Tom Foster (1870–1940) was an Australian Aboriginal musician. A member of the Tharawal people, he was born in New South Wales and lived for some time on the mission at La Perouse. He composed at least two spiritual songs which were performed for public occasions. The music was well received in Christian circles.

Foster was active in representing Aboriginal people.

Foster married and had three sons, Fred, Amos and Tommy, who each continued his performing legacy. He died in Kingsford in December 1940.

== Works ==
- 1930 My Thoughts
- 1930 I'm Happy Today

== Performances ==
In 1935, Foster entertained the Governor of New South Wales at a ball for charity.

Foster's gum-Leaf band was regarded as famous at the 1935 celebration of the silver jubilee of King George V.

Foster also promoted his Aboriginal culture through his use of boomerangs.

A photograph of Foster demonstrating his boomerang technique is preserved in the National Library of Australia. Some of the boomerangs he manufactured are also preserved.

My Thoughts by Tom Foster
MIDI file of My Thoughts 1930 Australian Aboriginal spiritual by Tom Foster
