= Wrong Side of the Road =

- Directed by: Ned Lander
- Produced by: Jordy Butler
- Starring: No Fixed Address, Us Mob
- Music by: Jordy Butler
- Release date: 1981
- Running time: 75 minutes (or 66 minutes?)
- Country: Australia
- Language: English
- Budget: $60,000

Wrong Side of the Road is a 1981 low-budget feature film made in South Australia. It is distinctive for being one of the first attempts to bring modern Australian Aboriginal music to a non-Indigenous audience, featuring all-Aboriginal rock reggae bands No Fixed Address and Us Mob.

== Production ==
The film grew out of the work that a white musician, Graeme Isaac, was doing with disaffected Aboriginal youths in Adelaide, South Australia, in the late 1970s. He encouraged them to move beyond country music (which had been the principal idiom for non-traditional Aboriginal musicians), and to explore rock and reggae. Out of this, a number of garage bands were formed, and attained a limited but ardent following in South Australian indigenous communities. The marginalised lifestyle of the musicians often brought them into contact with police and the courts, and Isaac recognised that this provided the raw material for a story that could be made into a film.

Isaac approached Ned Lander (an established socially-committed documentary film-maker from Sydney) with his idea, and a script was written, loosely based on the real lives of two of the bands Isaac had nurtured, Us Mob (who played straightforward rock) and No Fixed Address (whose music was strongly reggae-influenced). The script interspersed the music of the bands with episodes of conflict with the police, and finished with a triumphant homecoming gig at an Aboriginal community. The musicians, their families, and their community committed to the movie, and largely played themselves, under their own names, even though the story was fictionalised.

With limited funding, mostly from an Australian Government film-funding scheme, and the support of a group of non-Indigenous film technicians and actors, shooting on 16mm film took place over a period of four weeks in 1980.

== Release ==
The film, combining elements of road-movie and musical, drama and documentary, was released in 1981.

It was one of the first attempts to bring modern Australian Aboriginal music to a non-Indigenous audience, featuring all-Aboriginal rock reggae bands No Fixed Address and Us Mob.

The harassment and discrimination that Indigenous Australians routinely endured was exposed to an audience that had been largely oblivious, and contributed to an increased awareness of those issues in the wider Australian and international communities. Both bands in the film gained increased popularity, with No Fixed Address in particular achieving ground-breaking (though limited) exposure on mainstream Australian AM and FM radio.

Wrong Side of the Road won a number of awards, both in Australia and internationally. At the 1981 Australian Film Institute Awards, it received the Jury Prize and was also nominated for Best Film and Best Original Music Score.

== Soundtrack ==
The film's soundtrack was released in 1981 on Black Australia Records. Side 1 was No Fixed Address and Side 2 was Us Mob. It was produced by Philip Roberts and Graeme Isaac.

=== Track listing ===
No Fixed Address

1. "We Have Survived" (Bart Willoughby)
2. "Get a Grip" (Chris Jones)
3. "The Vision" (Jones)
4. "Black Mans Rights" (Willoughby)
5. "Greenhouse Holiday" (Willoughby)
6. "The Vision" (version) (Jones)

Us Mob

1. "Genocide" (Pedro Butler, Wally McArthur)
2. "Wrong Side of the Road" (Butler)
3. "Suicidal Contemplation" (Butler, Ronnie Ansell)
4. "Sunshine" (Butler)
5. "Tough Living" (Butler)
6. "Survive" (Ansell)

=== Charts ===
Chart (1981)	Peak position
Australia (Kent Music Report)	67

=== Personnel ===
No Fixed Address

- Les Graham – lead guitar
- Chris Jones – guitar, vocals
- Veronica Rankine (Note: Later Brodie - sister of Leila Rankine.) – saxophone, vocals
- John John Miller – bass
- Bart Willoughby – drums, vocals, percussion, didgeridoo

Us Mob

- Ronnie Ansell – bass
- Wally McArthur – drums
- Carroll Karpany – guitar
- Pedro Butler – guitar, vocals

== Restoration and reunion ==
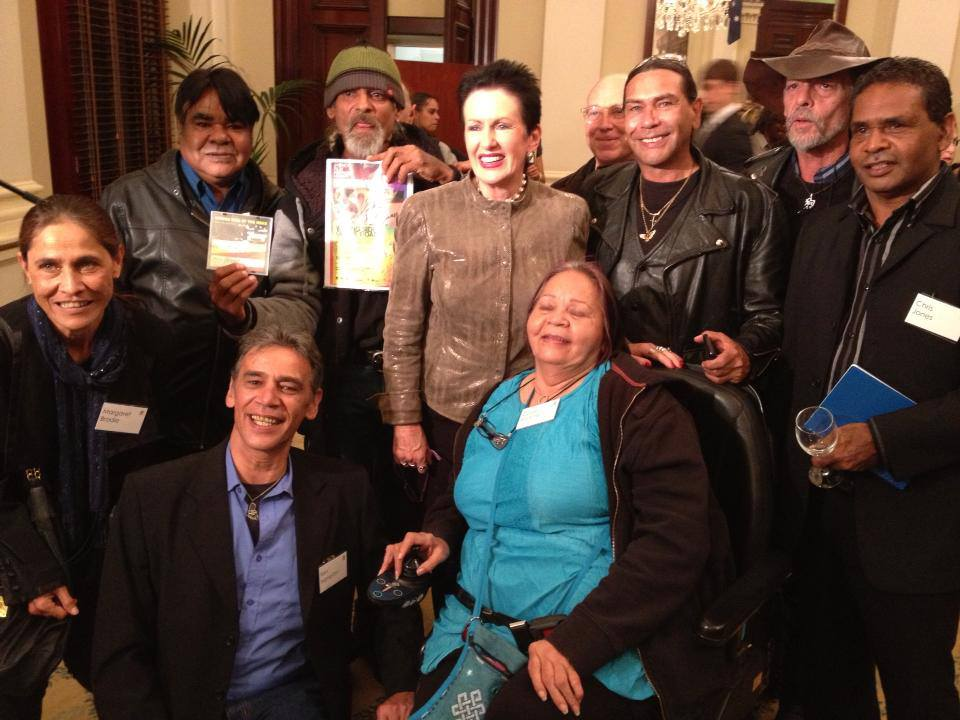
Wrong Side of the Road cast and crew with Clover Moore, Lord Mayor of Sydney. Left to right: (crouching) Veronica Brodie (Rankine); (standing) John Miller; (kneeling) Ken Hampton; (standing, holding photo) Donald (Ducky) Taylor; Lord Mayor, Clover Moore; (in wheelchair) Gayle Rankine; (in black leather jacket) Les Graham; (in hat) Peter (Pedro) Butler; (holding blue folder) Chris Jones, aka Ricky Harrison

A digital restoration of Wrong Side of the Road premiered at the 60th Sydney Film Festival (SFF) on 14 June 2013. The restoration was presented by the National Film and Sound Archive (NFSA).

With the expert technical support of Efilm/Deluxe, the film was restored frame by frame, and is now preserved in both analogue and digital formats.

Working with director Ned Lander and producer Graeme Isaac, the Indigenous Collections team of the NFSA gathered the ten surviving Aboriginal cast members back together in Sydney to conduct a series of oral history interviews to capture some of the stories about making the film as well as explore the impact this film has had on their lives and that of communities across Australia.

The interviews gave band and cast members an opportunity to tell their stories about their involvement in the film, its social and political message and the connection with their music. A wide range of issues was discussed ranging from racism, deaths in custody, identity and land rights.
