= ABC Television (Australian network) =

Main Australian public television broadcaster

- ABC Television logo used since 2018
- Type: Public broadcaster
- Branding: ABC
- Country: Australia
- Founded: 1956; 70 years ago
- Headquarters: ABC Ultimo Centre; 700 Harris Street; Ultimo NSW 2007
- Broadcast area: Australia
- Owner: Australian Broadcasting Corporation
- Launch date: 5 November 1956; 70 years ago
- Digital channels: Channel 2/21, 20 (HD), 22, 23, 24
- Picture format: 576i (SDTV); 1080i (HDTV)
- Television: In Australia: ABC TV / ABC TV HD; ABC Kids / ABC Family; ABC Entertains; ABC News; In the Pacific Islands and Southeast Asia: ABC Australia
- Official website: www.abc.net.au
- Language: English

ABC Television is the national television network of the Australian Broadcasting Corporation (ABC), the country's public broadcaster. It is one of the five main free-to-air networks in Australia, and holds the third-highest viewership as of 2025.

The ABC provides five non-commercial channels within Australia, headed by its flagship ABC TV channel. The local ABC stations in capital cities carry opt-outs for local programming, used mainly for nightly news broadcasts. Some radio channels are also broadcast via the television network. For the Pacific Islands and Southeast Asia region, the network carries a satellite channel, ABC Australia. Programming can be streamed online via ABC iview, its video on demand service.

The broadcaster's television service was launched in November 1956 from its first television station in Australia, ABN Sydney. This was the second one in the country, with the commercial channel TCN having launched two months earlier. An ABC television network covering every state and territory was completed by 1971, and in 2000 the television operations joined the ABC radio and online divisions at the corporation's Ultimo headquarters in Sydney in 2000.

== History ==
=== 1950s to 2000 ===
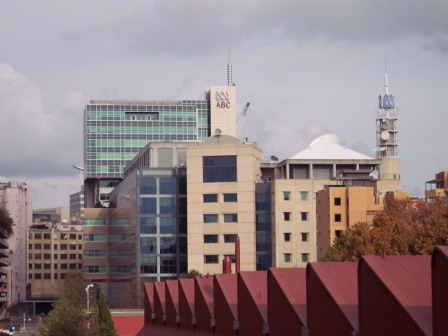
The ABC's Sydney headquarters in Ultimo

The first ever broadcast of ABC Television – presented by Michael Charlton, 5 November 1956.

The history of the ABC's television operations can be traced back to 1953, when the federal Television Act was passed, providing the initial regulatory framework for both the ABC and commercial television networks. Over the next three years, planning for the introduction of a national television service was put in place, land for studios and transmitters in Sydney and Melbourne was acquired, and overseas tutors were brought to Australia to assist with training. The ABC's 1956 Annual Report stated that it aimed to create a “television service as truly national in character as its resources will permit”.

Commercial station TCN-9 Sydney was the first to broadcast in Australia, in September 1956. The ABC's Sydney station, ABN, started transmission on 5 November 1956. Its first television broadcast was inaugurated by Prime Minister Robert Menzies at the Gore Hill studios in Sydney, and a couple of weeks later, ABV transmission began in Melbourne on 19 November 1956, in time to cover the 1956 Summer Olympics in Melbourne.

Outside broadcasting was also initiated on 5 November, from the ABC's first outside broadcast van. The van, now in the collection of the National Museum of Australia, was instrumental in the production of thousands of outside broadcasts. It was restored in time to be displayed at the 2000 Summer Olympics in Sydney and was used to film the visit of Queen Elizabeth II to the site of the National Museum in 2000.

ABQ in Brisbane was the third ABC TV station to launch, in November 1959; it was followed in 1960 by counterparts in Perth (ABW), Hobart (ABT), and Adelaide (ABS). ABC (also known as ABC3) opened in Canberra in 1962, with (ABD) in Darwin (13 August 1971) finally completing the ABC's television coverage of every state in 1971.

Although radio programs could be broadcast nationally by landline, television relay facilities were not put in place until the early 1960s. This meant that news bulletins had to be sent to each capital city by teleprinter, to be prepared and presented separately in each city, with filmed materials copied manually and sent to each state. A purpose-built television studio was built in Sydney, and opened on 29 January 1958, replacing temporary sound studios used since the ABC's television services launched in 1956. In the same year, technical equipment was also moved to permanent locations, while main transmitters were introduced to Melbourne and Sydney in 1957 and 1958, respectively.

Direct television relays between Sydney and Melbourne were established in 1961, replacing temporary microwave relays as a means of simultaneously airing programs across multiple stations. In 1963, using microwave transmission as a temporary measure, television programs from Adelaide were viewed simultaneously across the four eastern capitals. Videotape equipment, allowing the sharing of footage with much greater ease and speed, was installed in each state capital by 1962.

The organisational structure and internal processes of the network developed and changed over time, with local coverage incorporated in a network structure, which allowed the ABC to build state-based audiences for coverage of sports and news. Live coverage of sports was still limited to the location of the studio, for example for the West Indies cricket series in 1960/61, live broadcasts were limited to the four cities which hosted the test matches. The separate production and broadcast centres could only reach about 100 kilometres (62 mi) from a broadcast tower. It was only after considerable developments in technology and construction of further infrastructure, that in 1970/71 that test cricket was broadcast live in every state and the ACT.

Colour television was introduced in Australia on 1 March 1975.

Teletext services were introduced to ABC TV in 1983 to allow hearing-impaired viewers access to closed captions. International television service Australia Television International was established in 1993. Australia Television was sold to the Seven Network in 1998; however, the service continued to show content from ABC News until its closure in 2001.

==== Programming ====
ABC Television was one of the first television networks in Australia to embrace the rock 'n roll revolution of the late 1950s, most notably with Six O'Clock Rock, hosted by Johnny O'Keefe. During the 1960s and early 1970s the channel continued to broadcast programmes on popular music, including the pop show Hitscene, performance specials by groups such as Tully and Max Merritt & The Meteors, as well as the magazine-style programme GTK, which premiered in 1969 and screened for 10 minutes, four nights per week at 6:30 pm, immediately prior to Bellbird and the 7:00 pm news bulletin. The hugely popular rock music program, Countdown began in 1974, produced at ABC Melbourne's Ripponlea studios and hosted by Molly Meldrum, and ran until 1987.

The weekly current affairs program Four Corners was broadcast from Sydney from 1961, and in 1967, the weeknightly television current affairs programme This Day Tonight began.

In 1989, Aboriginal dancers Lillian Crombie and Malcolm Cole were the first co-presenters for Blackout, a program developed for Aboriginal and Torres Strait Islander audiences.

=== 2000 to present ===
The ABC's television operations joined its radio and online divisions at the corporation's Ultimo headquarters in 2000.

In 2001 a new logo was launched, featuring a modification to a three-dimensional metallic design, to celebrate the introduction of digital terrestrial television in Australia, when digital television was introduced to most of the network's coverage area on 1 January 2001, soon followed by the gradual introduction of widescreen and high definition programming. Between 2001 and 2003, the ABC operated two separate digital channels, ABC Kids and Fly TV, which opened soon after the launch of DTV.

In 2002, the ABC launched ABC Asia Pacific (now ABC Australia), the replacement for the defunct Australia Television channel operated previously by the Seven Network. Much like its predecessor, and companion radio network Radio Australia, the service provided a mix of programming targeted at audiences throughout the Asia-Pacific region. Funding cuts in 2003, meanwhile, led to the closure of Fly and the ABC Kid's Channel.

Also in 2002, to celebrate 70 years of the Australian Broadcasting Corporation, ABC TV's logo reverted to the "over and under" design seen in the previous decades; however it retained the three-dimensional metallic design. The channel's idents featured elements – fire, leaf and ice, and the slogan was updated to Everyone's ABC. The idents also featured the silver ring that morphs into the ABC logo. This however did not last, as later in 2003, the channel's idents were modified to feature everyday Australians.

In February 2005, the ABC switched from the Supertext logo to their own closed captioning logo. On 19 December that year, the channel's idents were revamped featuring a modified ABC logo transforming to a television.

ABC Family, a second attempt at a digital-only television channel, was launched on 7 March 2005, running on a budget of $3 million per year. Minister for Communications Helen Coonan inaugurated the channel at Parliament House three days later. Genre restrictions limiting the types of programming the channel could carry were lifted in October 2006; ABC2 (now ABC Family) was henceforth able to carry programming classified as comedy, drama, national news, sport and entertainment.

The ABC Guide broadcast on ABC2 in 2007

The ABC Guide was a regular television broadcast shown during the off-air periods for both ABC HD and ABC2 (now ABC Family) on their respective channels. It was launched on 30 May 2006 and was initially available in Sydney, with all other digital ABC broadcast regions launching the guide at a later date. The channel provided a live audio-stream of DiG Radio, and also provided weather reports. The guide advertised new and popular television programs from both channels via informational slides. The design and colour scheme were based on ABC Online's branding of the time, with the use of light blue, orange, and white, with each slide using elements from the respective channel's on-air branding. It was removed from channel 20 on 1 January 2008 when ABC HD relaunched as a full-time simulcast of ABC TV, and closed on 8 February 2008 when ABC2 (now ABC Family) was moved from channel 21 to channel 22 and began 24-hour broadcasting.

In the lead-up to the 2007 federal election, the Australian Government (then Liberal) endorsed a proposal submitted to the Australian Communications and Media Authority by the ABC to launch a second digital channel targeted at children. The new channel, titled ABC3 (now ABC Entertains), was to aim to provide at least 50% Australian-made content for children under 15. Unlike its predecessor, the ABC Kids channel, ABC3 (now ABC Entertains) would run from 6 am to 9 pm each day, and feature drama, comedy, animation and music. On 22 April 2009, the Labor government announced its commitment to the proposal as part of its response to the Australia 2020 Summit conducted in 2008, and ABC Entertains was launched on 4 December.

At midday on 8 February 2008, the original ABC Television channel was rebranded as ABC1, complementing the existing ABC2 (as of 2024, ABC Family) digital-only channel launched on 7 March 2005.

As of 2009, the ABC announced an Australia-wide upgrade to its digital service, and that it would provide a seven-day Electronic Program Guide (EPG) and give new logical channel numbers for all of ABC's television services.

June 2010 saw ABC1's ABC HD, the high definition digital TV channel, terminated, to be replaced with a fourth channel, ABC News 24 (now ABC News). In the same month playout was moved to a new facility shared with WIN Television at Ingleburn.

On 20 July 2014, ABC1 changed its name back to just "ABC TV" and at the same time, they introduced new idents featuring the 1975 Lissajous curve logo being drawn by itself of videos of people doing activities (taken from ABC Open's video library). Then, the words "It's (Insert Words Here)'s ABC" (the words change depending on the ident) fade in on the left side of the logo. The words then change to "#OurABC", which is the network's new slogan. In 2018, these idents were updated. The "#OurABC" slogan at the end of each ident was changed to "Yours". The new 2014 idents are all very similar to that of the 1996–1998, 1998–2000, 2003–2005, 2008–2011 and 2011–2014 ABC station idents in the past.

On 6 December 2016, ABC upgraded its HD picture resolution from 720p to 1080i.

Between July 2017 and June 2018, the whole of the ABC underwent an organisational restructure, after which the Radio and Television Divisions were no longer separate entities each under a director, instead being split across several functional divisions, with different teams producing different genres of content for television, radio and digital platforms. The Entertainment & Specialist (E&S) team focussed on comedy, kids' programs, drama, Indigenous-related programs, music, other entertainment and factual content; the new ABC Specialist team created content across the arts, science, religion & ethics, education and society & culture; while the Regional & Local team focussed on regional and local content.

The 1975 version of the ABC logo was reinstated in February 2019. On 3 September 2019, several additional ABC Digital Radio channels were added to complement the ABC Jazz and Double J services being simulcast on digital TV.

In 2024, the ABC announced a refreshed television strategy. It would rebrand ABC TV Plus (formerly ABC2, then ABC Comedy) to ABC Family, and ABC Me (formerly ABC3) to ABC Entertains. The latter would shift its target audience from primary school children and teenagers to adults. Former ABC Me content was mainly moved to the ABC iview app.

By 26 June 2025, the ABC Entertains and ABC News channels would be converted to HD (in MPEG-4).

== Services ==
=== Australia ===
==== National ====
As of 2026, the ABC operates five television stations within four channels, all of them non-commercial. These services are available nationally through digital terrestrial television, and all the digital TV services are also available through the VAST free-to-air satellite service.

List of ABC television channels with LCN, logo, resolution and notes
LCN	Logo	Service	Resolution	Notes
02 and 21		ABC TV	720x576i50	Main ABC television channel with first-run comedy, drama, documentaries, and news and current affairs. In each state and territory a local news bulletin is shown at 7 pm nightly. Formerly ABC1.
20		ABC TV HD	1920x1080i50	The ABC's first high-definition channel.
22		ABC Kids	720x576i50	Preschool children's channel programming block from 5:00 am to 7:30 pm. Formerly ABC 4 Kids and ABC For Kids on 2.
22		ABC Family	720x576i50	Family and teen entertainment programming block from 7:30 pm and 3:00 am. Formerly ABC2, ABC Comedy and ABC TV Plus.
23		ABC Entertains	1920x1080i50	General adult entertainment. Formerly ABC3 and ABC Me.
24		ABC News	1920x1080i50	Dedicated news channel featuring local programming, including parliamentary question time, plus BBC and Deutsche Welle coverage. Formerly ABC News 24.

The ABC also broadcasts several of its radio channels on their television service.

List of ABC radio channels with LCN and notes
LCN	Service	Notes
25	ABC Local Radio	State capital city channel simulcast, e.g. ABC Radio Sydney
26	RN	Radio channel simulcast
27	ABC Classic	Radio channel simulcast
28	Triple J	Radio channel simulcast
29	Triple J Unearthed	Radio channel simulcast
200	Double J	Radio channel simulcast
201	ABC Jazz	Radio channel simulcast
202	ABC Kids Listen	Radio channel simulcast
203	ABC Country	Radio channel simulcast
204	ABC NewsRadio	Radio channel simulcast

==== State-based programming ====
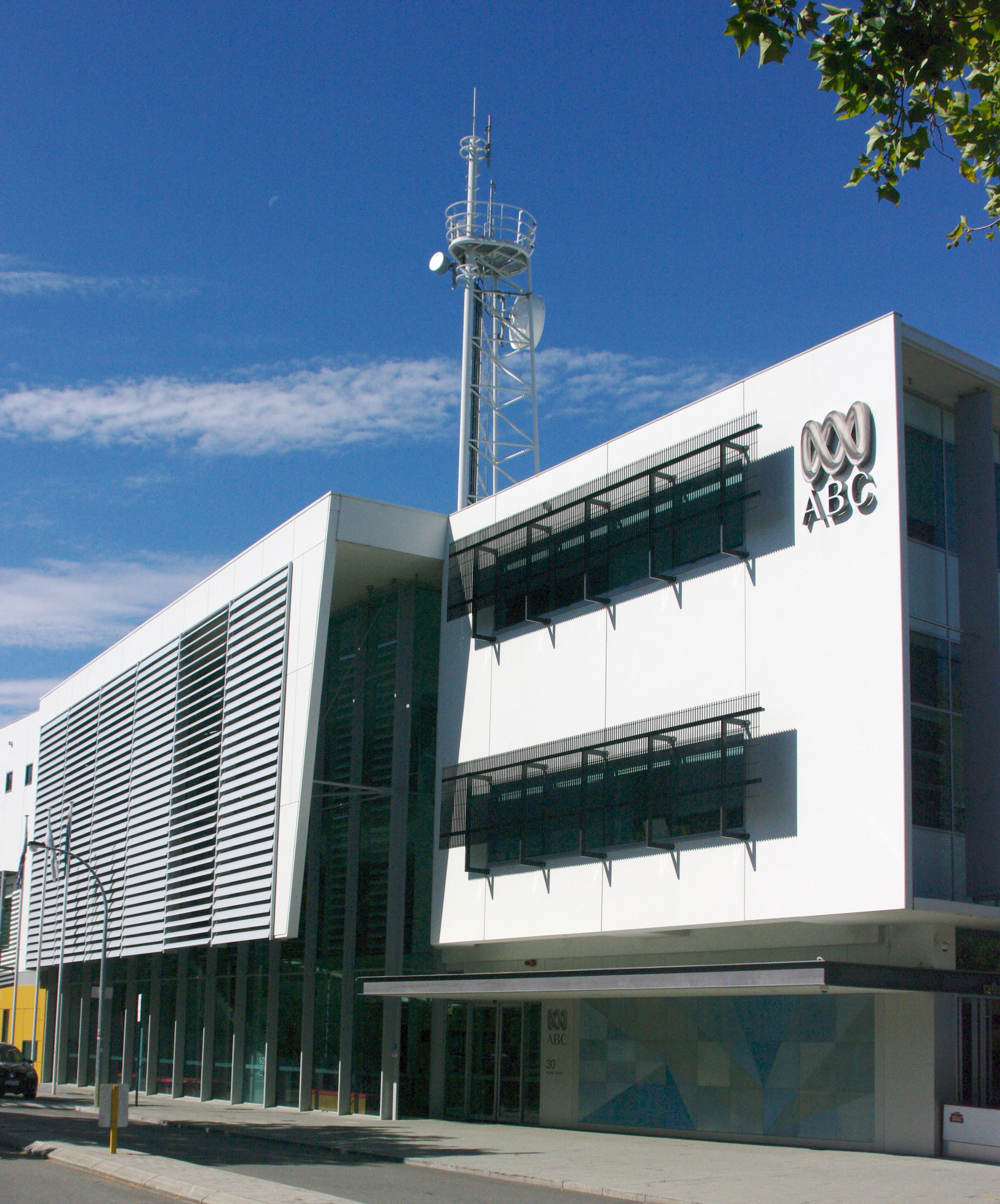
ABC digital studios in East Perth opened in 2005

Although the ABC's headquarters in Sydney serve as a base for program distribution nationally, ABC Television network is composed of eight state- and territory-based centres, once separate stations with their own branding, until 5 December 2014. In addition to the nightly 7 pm news, ABC broadcast 7.30 on Friday evenings, state election coverage and in some states and territories carried live local sport on weekends.

ABC Local includes more than 50 newsrooms across regions within each state. They are responsible for broadcasting local news and radio broadcasting for the region.

=== ABC iview ===
ABC iview is a video on demand and catch up TV service, which became available on 24 July 2008. This was the next step after the podcasting of radio programmes from July 2006. Iview can only be viewed by users in Australia. The iview website streams video at 650 kbit/s in the H.264 format, and uses the RTMP protocol, which makes it accessible to web browsers installed with Adobe Flash. Iview is also available through native apps for iOS and Android smartphones, tablets, and HDMI devices, as well as on some brands of internet-connected TVs. These use a HTTP stream to deliver video to the client.

=== Overseas ===
ABC Australia is an international satellite television service operated by the ABC, funded by advertising and grants from the Department of Foreign Affairs and Trade. The service is available via subscription to viewers across East Asia, South Asia, South-East Asia and Pacific Islands, including India, Japan, Vietnam, Afghanistan, the Philippines, Papua New Guinea and Vanuatu, and broadcasts a mixture of English-language programming, including general entertainment, sport, and current affairs.

== Ratings ==
As of 2025, the ABC is the third-highest rating network in Australia, behind the Seven Network and Nine Network, but ahead of Network 10 and the secondary public broadcaster Special Broadcasting Service.

== Funding ==
ABC television services within Australia carry no advertising by external sources; it is banned under the Australian Broadcasting Corporation Act 1983, which also ensures its editorial independence. The ABC receives most of its funding from the Australian Government (some revenue is earned by ABC Commercial), but has suffered progressive funding cuts under Liberal governments since the 1996 Howard government, with particularly deep cuts in 2014 under the Abbott government, and an ongoing indexation freeze as of 2021. In spite of these cuts, in April 2023 social media platform X (formerly Twitter) tagged ABC as "government-funded media"; in August 2023, ABC announced the closure of all but four of its X accounts.

ABC Australia, which broadcasts throughout the Asia-Pacific region, receives additional funds through DFAT and some advertising on the channel.

== See also ==
- Children's programming on ABC Television
