= Mixed Relations =

Australian band playing reggae, pop, rock

- Origin: Sydney, New South Wales, Australia
- Genres: Reggae rock
- Years active: 1988–1995
- Labels: Red Eye
- Past members: Bart Willoughby; Murray Cook; Sue Irvin; Sharon Carpenter; Brenda Gifford; Leroy Cummings; Alvin Duffin; Alice Haines; Vanessa Lucas; Selwyn Burns; Meg Briansky; Rachel Perkins

Mixed Relations were an Australian band formed by Bart Willoughby. They played a mixture of reggae rock, pop and jazz. Mixed Relations toured Aboriginal communities, Australian cities, Pacific Islands, New Zealand, United States, Europe, Canada and Hong Kong. Their song, "Aboriginal Woman" was listed at No. 89 on the Triple J Hottest 100, 1993.

== History ==
Mixed Relations were formed in Sydney by Bart Willoughby on percussion, lead vocals, guitar and didgeridoo in late 1988. Willoughby had been a member of No Fixed Address, Coloured Stone and Yothu Yindi. Australian musicologist, Ian McFarlane, felt that Mixed Relations played "an infectious and funky hybrid of reggae, pop, rock and jazz. The band established a solid live reputation." Their debut performance was at the Aboriginal Music Festival, Darwin, in December 1988.

In August 1991 the group toured Europe and Canada. Kaarin Davies-Cassin of Green Left Weekly described their sound, which "blends syncopation and counterpoint harmony, weaving traditional Australian rhythms and melodic form with traditional and Western instruments."

In October 1992 Mixed Relations issued their debut extended play, Take It or Leave It, on Red Eye Records. Alongside Willoughby the group included Murray Cook (not the one from the Wiggles) on keyboards and bass guitar (ex-Warumpi Band, Happening Thang), Leroy Cummings on guitar, Alvin Duffin on drums and percussion (ex-Mantaka), Brenda Gifford on saxophone, piano and backing vocals, Alice Haines on vocals and percussion, Vanessa Lucas on bass guitar, violin and backing vocals (ex-Tall Tales & True). They followed with their single, "Aboriginal Woman" (February 1993), and their debut album, Love, appeared in April. The Canberra Times' Nic Haygarth opined that the album was "a concoction of joyous sounds urban and outback, indigenous and electric, with the spirit of Aboriginal culture at its core."

Willoughby explained his stylistic philosophy to Haygarth, "There are people who came from radio to black and white television, and people who came from black and white television to colour, and there are people born to go from colour to virtual reality. We are the ones that remember the change from black and white to colour. And now you've got no corroboree rock, but a black and white sort of thing. I had to find some way to change from No Fixed Address. Mixed Relations allows me to work with whoever I want and play whatever I want. This style is like the middle where I am."

"Aboriginal Woman", was listed at No. 89 on Triple J's listener's poll: Hottest 100 for 1993. In November 1993 Willoughby was presented with the best indigenous performer award at the Australian Music Awards.

Other musicians in Mixed Relations included Megan Briansky on keyboards and vocals, Sharon Carpenter on percussion and vocals, and Suzanne Irvin on keyboards. The group disbanded in 1995 when Willoughby returned to his Pitjantjatjara community as a music teacher. From 1997 he worked as a solo artist and in 2008 he reformed No Fixed Address.

Alice Haines departed the band in 1992 to play the part of Rosie in the national touring production of Bran Nue Dae. She subsequently starred in the film Serenades, in the female lead role of Jila, her own stage musical show Alice in 2001 and releasing a solo album Matter of Time in 2005. After the disbandment of Mixed Relations Murray Cook joined Mental As Anything. Selwn Burns played with No Fixed Address, Coloured Stone and Blackfire. Vanessa Lucas was a short-term member of Tall Tales and True. Brenda Gifford, a music teacher, later recalled her time with Mixed Relations, "It was a really great experience, I got to see Australia – urban, regional, remote, traditional. And we got to see a bit of the world."

== Discography ==
=== Albums ===
- Love (April 1993)

=== Extended plays ===
- Take It or Leave It (October 1992) Red Eye Records

=== Singles ===
- "Aboriginal Woman" (1993)
