= Grant Hansen =

Australian singer

Grant Hansen is an Australian Indigenous musician and broadcaster who has worked as a host of the Marngrook footy show, broadcast on National Indigenous TV network as well as Channel 31, Foxtel, ABC and SBS . He has worked as a radio announcer / presenter on Melbourne's Indigenous radio station 3KND. Hansen won a Deadly in 2000 for Aboriginal Broadcaster of the Year. He has also worked at 3CR, SBS and SEN sports station.

== Musical career ==
Hansen was one of the founding members of Blackfire who were one of Australia’s most successful indigenous acts of the 90s. They were awarded a NAIDOC award for Artists of the year and received an international songwriting award for the song My Island Paradise. Hansen was the manager of Blackfire for ten of their 12 years, taking over from Anthony Brown.

He also founded the Kutcha Edwards Band when Blackfire took a break after being on the road for 12 years .

Hansen released a solo album Big City Combo (2007) which features guest appearances from Wilbur Wilde, Ross Wilson, Paul Kelly and Paul Hester.

Hansen’s Big City Combo Band now features former members of OL’55, Swanee, Delltones, Dynamic Hepnotics and Mental as Anything. Grant has also played with and managed Koori acts including Interaction, Mercury Blues, Deniece Hudson, Bob Wilson and Vic Simms. He has toured all over Australia as well as China, Japan, Taiwan, Canada, Mexico, and is a leading indigenous musician in the Australian music scene.

He was a founding member and former CEO of Songlines Music Aboriginal corporation. He worked as the CEO for 12 years. In 2003, he created the biggest indigenous music concert Share the Spirit held every year in Melbourne on 26 January.

== Television career ==
Hansen was the creator and host of Australia’s most popular indigenous TV show Marngrook, and worked on the show as a presenter, writer, producer. Marngrook aired on NITV for twelve years.

He has acted and appeared in the Chinese series Rich Dad Poor Dad, and starred in the live theater production Up the Road. He has worked on other TV programs including Staying Healthy Staying Alive, ABC’s Songlines, and served as host of the Treaty TV Show on SBS.
