= Leila Rankine =

(1932–1993) Aboriginal musician and community worker

- Born: Dorothy Leila Rankine; 31 December 1932; Rose Park, South Australia
- Died: 15 January 1993 (aged 60); Adelaide, South Australia
- Employer: Centre for Aboriginal Studies in Music

Dorothy Leila Rankine (31 December 1932 – 15 January 1993) was an Aboriginal community worker, musician, and poet. Known as Leila Rankine, she was a founding member of Adelaide Aboriginal Orchestra and the Centre for Aboriginal Studies in Music.

== Early life and education ==
Leila Rankine, of Ngarrindjeri and Kaurna descent, was born on 31 December 1932 in the Adelaide suburb of Rose Park. She was the daughter of Rebecca Kumi (née Harris) and Daniel Wilson. She grew up and was educated at the Point McLeay Mission Station (now Raukkan) on Lake Alexandrina.

== Life and work ==
Married and with five children, Rankine joined the Council of Aboriginal Women of South Australia at its inception in 1966. Alongside Ruby Hammond and Gladys Elphick, she strove to improve education for Aboriginal people.

With her sister, Veronica Brodie, she lobbied for the establishment of the Warriappendi School, developed to better meet the needs of Aboriginal children in the 1980s.

Rankine was a founding member of the Adelaide Aboriginal Orchestra in 1972 and co-founded the Centre for Aboriginal Studies in Music (CASM). In both, students were taught by Aboriginal Elders and encouraged to reconnect with their cultural heritage. Musician Bart Willoughby OAM, who attended CASM, credits Rankine helping to care for him and guide him during this period.

In 1975, Rankine was appointed a member of the Aboriginal Arts Board, which had been established two years earlier. She was served on the steering committee for the Festival of Pacific Arts in 1988.

=== Films ===
Rankine was featured in the 1975 documentary film, Sister If Only You Knew, on Aboriginal women who had grown up on reserves but later moved to the city to give their children better opportunities. She contributed to the 1981 film Wrong Side of the Road, which won the Australian Film Institute's jury prize at the 1981 AFI Awards.

== Personal life and death ==
Rankine married James William Rankine (died 1969) in 1954. They had five children before moving to Adelaide in 1965.

Their daughter Aunty Leila Gayle Rankine was a lifelong advocate for Aboriginal people with disabilities, and chair of the First Peoples Disability Network. Another daughter, Veronica Rankine, became played tenor saxophone in the highly successful reggae rock band No Fixed Address, led by Bart Willoughby. She died in 2001, and was posthumously inducted into the SA Music Hall of Fame.

Rankine suffered from diabetes and complications led to the amputation of a leg. She died on 15 January 1993 and her ashes were scattered on the Coorong.

== Legacy ==
A rehabilitation facility, the Leila Rankine House of Hope was opened in 2018 at Monarto and run by the Aboriginal Sobriety Group, on whose board she had earlier served.

The Leila Rankine Award for Excellence in SACE Stage 2 Aboriginal Studies was established in her memory. Administered by Humanities and Social Sciences SA, it recognises both the "highest achieving student" and "their teacher for excellence in teaching".
