= Building Bridges (residential program) =

Program in Thompson Falls, Montana

Building Bridges is a program located in Thompson Falls, Montana, designed to help adolescent males with addiction and behavior issues. It was created in 1996 to house male teenagers, aged 14 to 18, in a natural and highly structured environment. Building Bridges is a private, small, long-term residential program, of a self-reported average duration of 12–18 months. It is a member of the National Association of Therapeutic Schools and Programs (NATSAP).

== See also ==
- Adventure therapy
- Wilderness therapy
