= We Have Survived =

Song by No Fixed Address

from the album From My Eyes
- Released: 1982
- Recorded: 1981
- Studio: The Production Workshop, Melbourne
- Genre: Reggae
- Length: 4:40
- Label: Rough Diamond
- Songwriter: Bart Willoughby

"We Have Survived" is a song originally performed by No Fixed Address (NFA). It was composed by Bart Willoughby when he was 18. It first appeared in the film Wrong Side of the Road and on its soundtrack and was later included on NFA's album From My Eyes. It has since been included in The Black Arm Bands concert murundak.

"We Have Survived" is considered to be an Aboriginal Australian anthem and an "anthem of cultural persistence"

In 2008 it was added to the National Film and Sound Archive's Sounds of Australia registry.
