= Ilkari Maru =

- Origin: Amata, South Australia, Australia
- Genres: Country rock
- Label: CAAMA Music
- Past members: Warren Tunkin; Larry Brady; Andrew Ken; Adam Tunkin; Leonard Jacob

Ilkari Maru are an Australian Indigenous band from the 1980s. They played country rock music and sing in English and Pitjantjatjara. They released two albums through CAAMA Music, Ilkari Maru (1984) and Lightning Strikes (Wangangarangk Rungkanu) (1987).
