= Us Mob =

Us Mob were an Aboriginal reggae rock band from South Australia.

== History ==
The band, comprising Aboriginal Australian members from South Australia, was formed in the late 1970s at the Centre for Aboriginal Studies in Music in Adelaide in the 1980s. It played rock reggae music.

Us Mob appeared in the 1981 film Wrong Side of the Road with fellow CASM band No Fixed Address The recording of the soundtrack made the two bands the first contemporary Aboriginal bands to be recorded.

They relocated to Sydney and broke up after their equipment was destroyed by a fire.

== Recognition ==
Along with No Fixed Address they were nominated for the 1981 AFI Award for Best Original Music for the music from the film Wrong Side of the Road.

Us Mob was the subject of an ABC Message Stick documentary in February 2000, which said that they were "one of those who paved the way for others like Yothu Yindi and Christine Anu, staying true to their culture.

== Members ==
- Ronnie Ansell - Bass
- Pedro Butler - Guitar/vocals
- Carroll Karpany - Guitar
- Wally McArthur - Drums

== Discography ==
=== Soundtrack ===
List of albums, with Australian chart positions
Title	Album details	Peak chart positions
Title	Album details	AUS
Wrong Side of the Road (with No Fixed Address)	Released: 1981; Label: Black Australia Records (YPRX-1905)	67
