= No Fixed Address (band) =

Australian musical group

No Fixed Address (NFA)
- Origin: Adelaide, South Australia
- Genre: Reggae rock
- Years active: 1979–1985, 1987–1988, 2008, 2016–present
- Labels: Rough Diamond; Astor; PolyGram; Mushroom
- Members: Bart Willoughby; Ricky Harrison; Tjimba Possum Burns; Sean Moffat
- Past members: see Members list

No Fixed Address (NFA) are an Australian reggae rock group whose members are all Aboriginal Australians, mostly from South Australia. The band formed in 1979, split in 1984, with several brief reformations or guest appearances in 1987–1988 and 2008, before reuniting in 2016 and continuing to perform into 2024. The original members were Bart Willoughby, Les Graham (aka Leslie Lovegrove), Ricky Harrison, John Miller, and Veronica Rankine. As of 2024 the members are Willoughby, Harrison, Tjimba Possum Burns, and Sean Moffat. They were the first Aboriginal band to travel overseas. They have been inducted into the Hall of Fame at the inaugural National Indigenous Music Awards as well as the SA Music Hall of Fame, and have had a laneway in Adelaide CBD named after them.

== Biography ==
=== 1979–1984 ===
No Fixed Address formed in 1979 at the Centre for Aboriginal Studies in Music (CASM) in North Adelaide, South Australia. Most of the band members were students at CASM, where they first heard reggae music from Jamaica, including Bob Marley, Peter Tosh, and Jimmy Cliff.

The all-Aboriginal band was led by Pitjanjatjara man Bart Willoughby (lead vocals and drums), from Koonibba Mission near Ceduna in the far south-west of South Australia, and included Gunaikurnai man Ricky Harrison (rhythm guitarist and principal songwriter) from Morwell in Victoria; Ngarrindjeri man Leslie Lovegrove Freeman (lead guitarist; also known as Les Graham) from Murray Bridge in South Australia; John Miller (bass) from Port Lincoln in South Australia; and Ngarrindjeri woman Veronica Rankine (tenor saxophone; daughter of Leila Rankine), from the south-east of South Australia. All of the members were related through family ties. Veronica was very talented and could also play piano, flute, and clarinet.

In 1979, NFA played its first large concert at the National Aboriginal Day held at Taperoo, South Australia, and were especially supported by community radio station 5MMM after this. Four of their songs made the Top 5 playlist on Three D Radio (then 5MMM). The band became a very popular pub rock outfit among students and the alternative music scene.

In July 1980, the band performed at the second "Rock Against Racism" concert at the Northcote Town Hall in Northcote, Melbourne, along with bands including Men at Work, and Ross Hannaford's Lucky Dog, and feminist circus troupe Wimmin's Circus.

In 1980 the band made a feature film titled Wrong Side of the Road with another CASM band, Us Mob. The movie dealt with the trials and joys of touring and the contrasting receptions they received in Indigenous and non-Indigenous communities. With the recording of the soundtrack, No Fixed Address, and Us Mob became the first contemporary Aboriginal bands to be recorded. The film won the Jury Prize for best picture at the 1981 AFI Awards. The soundtrack album to Wrong Side of the Road, with six tracks from each of the bands, sold well and received plenty of airplay on indie radio stations. Mick Pacholli became their manager.

They toured to Perth, where 13 of their 20 booked gigs were cancelled when the promoters found out they were Aboriginal. Cold Chisel happened to be there and helped them to book some gigs. Willoughby broke his right arm in Perth, and the band had to get a replacement drummer for a concert that was filmed by ABC Television for Rock Arena.

On the strength of their live performances and airplay of their demo recordings on 5MMM they were the cover story on the August 1980 edition of national rock magazine Roadrunner. In December 1980, the band supported Cold Chisel on its "Summer Offensive" tour to the east coast, with the final concert on 20 December at the University of Adelaide.

In 1982 the band were contracted to Rough Diamond Records, a subsidiary of Polygram Records and released their debut mini-album From My Eyes, produced by David Briggs, former guitarist with Little River Band. The album was launched at the Hilton Hotel by the Australian Prime Minister, Bob Hawke. The video for the single, "From My Eyes" was filmed at Hanging Rock in Victoria and the Old Melbourne Gaol. The band toured Australia in 1982, in support of Peter Tosh. Following the success of the Peter Tosh tour, the band became the first Aboriginal band to travel overseas, touring Great Britain, playing at nine cities including London, Bristol, Leeds, Plymouth, and Manchester, as well as the Elephant Fayre festival and at a concert for the coal miners' strike.

Didgeridoo player Billy Inda made a guest appearance and Joe Geia played the introduction didgeridoo on folk rock band Goanna's single "Solid Rock" from their 1982 album, Spirit of Place. The single peaked at No. 3 in October on the Kent Music Report Singles Chart, the first charting rock song to feature the didgeridoo.

In January 1983, No Fixed Address performed at the Narara Music Festival at Somersby, NSW.

The 1984 video for "We Have Survived" was filmed at Palm Beach and Botany Bay in Sydney. The song has become an unofficial anthem for many of Australia's Indigenous peoples, with its most well-known line "We have survived /The White man’s world /And you know /You can’t change that".

NFA also toured with Ian Dury and the Blockheads (November 1981), The Clash (February 1982), Midnight Oil, Split Enz, Mental as Anything, and others.

Willoughby joined his cousin (Bunna Lawrie)'s band, Coloured Stone in 1984.

=== 1987–1988 ===
In 1987 Willoughby reformed the band and they toured Europe, including a number of Eastern Bloc countries, appearing at the East Berlin Festival. In late 1988 Willoughby joined Yothu Yindi and as result the group disbanded again.

=== 2008 ===
In 2008 the band reformed and played at the Dreaming Festival in Woodford, Queensland, and (in November) the Tarerer Festival in Port Fairy, Victoria, where they released a limited edition CD copy of From My Eyes.

Also in 2008 the band's song "We Have Survived" was added to the National Film and Sound Archive's Sounds of Australia registry.

=== 2016–present ===
In June 2016, Ricky Harrison, Les Graham, John Miller, and Bart Willoughby reunited to perform in Adelaide when they were inducted into the SA Music Hall of Fame. It was announced that Veronica Rankine, who died in 2001, would be posthumously inducted.

On 29 September 2016 the band performed at the Lomond Hotel in Brunswick East, Melbourne.

The band performed on Australia Day at the Share the Spirit Festival in the Treasury Gardens, Melbourne, in both 2017 and 2020. They also performed at the Saltwater Festival in Broome, Western Australia, in 2018.

On 25 March 2021 they performed at The Gov in Adelaide to celebrate the naming of "No Fixed Address Lane" in the city (see below).

A biography of the band, titled No Fixed Address was published in May 2023. It was written by former music journalist Donald Robertson and published by Hybrid Publishers, Melbourne.

In August 2023, the band performed at Her Majesty's Theatre in Adelaide. In 2024, they announced that they would be performing around Australia for the 40th anniversary of their UK tour. In January 2024 they performed at the Sidney Myer Music Bowl in Melbourne for the Share the Spirit Festival in Melbourne, along with Coloured Stone, Blackfire, Stray Blacks, and many other Indigenous musicians. In June 2024 they performed as part of Vivid Sydney and in January 2025 they performed for the Sydney Yabun Festival on January 26.

== Members ==
Various band members have included:

=== Founding members ===
- Bart Willoughby – drums, vocals, guitar, didgeridoo (1979–1985, 1986–1988, 2008–current)
- Les Graham (aka Leslie Lovegrove and Les Graham Kelly) - guitar (1979–1983, 1986–1988, 2008–2022)
- Ricky Harrison (aka Chris Jones) – guitar (1979–1985, 2008-current)
- John Miller – bass (1979–1981, 1986–1988, 2008-2023)
- Veronica Rankine (died 2001) – vocals, saxophone, flute (1979–1980)

=== Other members ===
- John Newchurch - vocals (1979)
- Tony Mullett - bass (1979)
- Donald 'Duckie' Taylor – bass (1979, 1982-1983)
- Carroll Karpeny - guitar (1979)
- Joe Geia – vocals, percussion, didgeridoo (1982–1983)
- Joe Hayes – bass (1981-1982)
- Billy Inda Cummins – percussion, didgeridoo (1981-1983)
- Nicky Moffat (Note: Sometimes incorrectly spelt "Moffatt", but most reliable sources have only a single "t".) – bass (1982–1985)
- Peter Meredith – guitar (1983)
- Billy Gorham – bass (1983)
- Louis McManus – guitar (1983–1984)
- Selwyn Burns – guitar (1984-1985, 2023)
- Monty Lovett - bass (1985)
- David Osborne - guitar (1985)
- Rick Lovegrove (deceased) – guitar (1986–1988)
- Tjimba Possum Burns - bass (2023-current)
- Sean Moffat (nephew of Ricky Harrison) – lead guitar (2023-current)

=== Current lineup ===
As of 2023 the lineup was:

- Bart Willoughby
- Ricky Harrison
- Tjimba Possum Burns
- Sean Moffat

== Discography ==
=== Albums ===
List of albums, with Australian chart positions
Title	Album details	Peak chart positions
Title	Album details	AUS
Wrong Side of the Road (Soundtrack with Us Mob)	Released: 1981; Format: LP, CD, Cassette; Label: Black Australia Records (YPRX-1905)	67
From My Eyes	Released: 1982; Format: LP, CD, Cassette; Label: Rough Diamond/Astor/PolyGram (RDM 8804)	77

=== Singles ===
Year	Title	Album
1982	"From My Eyes"/"We Have Survived"	From My Eyes

== Awards and recognition ==
- "We Have Survived" was added to the National Film and Sound Archive's Sounds of Australia registry in 2008.
- In 2020, Lindes Lane (a street abutting Adelaide's Rundle Mall) was renamed "No Fixed Address Lane", in honour of the band.

=== National Indigenous Music Awards ===
The National Indigenous Music Awards (NIMA) (formally NT Indigenous Music Awards) recognise excellence, dedication, innovation and outstanding contribution to the Northern Territory music industry. They commenced in 2004.

Year	Nominee / work	Award	Result	Ref.
2011	No Fixed Address	Hall of Fame	inducted	

=== South Australian Music Awards ===
The South Australian Music Awards, also known as SA Music Awards, commonly SAM Awards, formerly Fowler's Live Music Awards (FLMA), are annual awards that exist to recognise, promote and celebrate excellence in the South Australian contemporary music industry. They commenced in 2012.

Year	Nominee / work	Award	Result	Ref.
2016	No Fixed Address	South Australian Music Hall of Fame	inducted	
