= List of Indigenous Australian musicians =

This is a list of Indigenous Australian musicians.

== Solo artists ==
- Adam James – country singer
- Alan Dargin – didgeridoo player
- Ali Mills – singer
- Alice Skye – singer-songwriter
- Andrew Gurruwiwi – singer-songwriter
- Archie Roach – singer-songwriter and guitarist
- Ash Dargan – didgeridoo player
- Auriel Andrew – country musician
- Baker Boy (Danzal Baker) – rapper
- Barkaa – rapper
- Bart Willoughby – musician
- Becca Hatch – musician and singer-songwriter
- Bernard Carney – musician
- Birdz – rapper and singer-songwriter
- Black Allan Barker – country/blues singer
- Bob Randall – singer and author
- Bobby McLeod – activist, poet, healer and musician
- Brenda Webb – rock singer
- Briggs – hip-hop performer
- Brothablack – hip-hop performer
- Budjerah – singer-songwriter
- Bumpy – singer-songwriter
- Burragubba – didgeridoo player
- Casey Donovan – pop/rock singer
- Christine Anu – singer-songwriter, actress, producer, and speaker
- Dallas Woods – rapper
- Dan Sultan – rock singer
- David Arden – singer and guitarist
- David Blanasi – didgeridoo player
- David Hudson – didgeridoo player
- David Williams – didgeridoo player
- Deborah Cheetham – opera singer
- Dewayne Everettsmith – singer
- Djalu Gurruwiwi – didgeridoo player
- Djolpa McKenzie – reggae, rock, dub and funk singer
- Dobby – rapper and activist
- Dougie Young – country musician
- Emma Donovan – singer-songwriter
- Emily Wurramara – roots singer-songwriter
- Frank Yamma – indigenous roots musician
- Gawurra – singer-songwriter
- Geoffrey Gurrumul Yunupingu – singer and guitarist
- George Assang – singer and actor
- George Rrurrambu – rock singer
- Georgia Lee – jazz and blues singer
- Glen Heald – musician, songwriter and producer
- Glenn Skuthorpe – folk and country singer-songwriter
- Grant Hansen – musician and broadcaster
- Gus Williams – country musician, community leader
- Harold Blair – tenor
- Herbie Laughton – country singer
- Isaiah Firebrace – soul/pop singer
- Isaac Yamma – country musician
- J-Milla – rapper and singer-songwriter
- Jem Cassar Daley – singer and musician
- Jessica Mauboy – pop and R&B singer
- Jimblah – hip-hop artist
- Jimmy Chi – composer, musician and playwright
- Jimmy Little – country singer
- Joe Geia – musician
- JK-47 – rapper
- Johnny Nicol – jazz singer
- Kaiit – neo-soul singer
- Kankawa Nagarra – blues and gospel singer-songwriter
- Kev Carmody – singer-songwriter
- The Kid Laroi – rapper and singer-songwriter
- Kutcha Edwards – singer-songwriter
- Lady Lash – rapper and singer-songwriter
- Leah Flanagan – singer-songwriter
- Little G – rapper
- Lou Bennett – musician and actor
- Mandawuy Yunupingu – singer and community leader
- Marcus Corowa – blues, soul and jazz musician
- Mark Atkins – didgeridoo player
- Marlene Cummins – blues singer and saxophonist
- Maroochy Barambah – mezzo-soprano
- Mau Power – hip-hop artist
- Miiesha – singer-songwriter
- Miss Kaninna – singer and rapper
- Mo'Ju – songwriter, vocalist and musician
- Munkimuk – hip-hop artist
- Naomi Wenitong – singer-songwriter
- Rachel Perkins – director, producer, screenwriter and singer
- Radical Son – singer
- Reggae Dave – reggae musician
- Richard Frankland – playwright, musician and activist
- Richard Walley – activist and didgeridoo player
- Rita Mills – singer
- Robyn Green – gospel singer
- Rochelle Watson – R&B and soul singer
- Roger Knox – country singer
- RONA.
- Ruby Hunter – singer-songwriter
- Sammy Butcher – guitarist
- Scott Darlow – singer-songwriter and didgeridoo player
- Seaman Dan – singer-songwriter
- Sharnee Fenwick – country singer
- Sharon-Lee Lane – country singer
- Shellie Morris – singer-songwriter
- Sycco (Sasha McLeod) – singer-songwriter
- Tasman Keith – rapper ans singer-songwriter
- Thelma Plum – pop singer-songwriter
- Tia Gostelow – singer-songwriter
- Tom E. Lewis – actor and musician
- Tom Foster – Gospel songwriter
- Toni Janke – soul singer
- Trevor Adamson – country/gospel singer
- Troy Cassar-Daley – country musician
- Ursula Yovich – actress and singer
- Vic Simms – singer-songwriter
- Warren H Williams – country musician
- William Barton – didgeridoo player
- Wilma Reading – jazz singer
- Xavier Rudd – folk singer
- Ziggy Ramo – singer-songwriter

== Indigenous bands ==
- 3% – rap group
- A.B. Original – hip hop duo
- Aim 4 More – Brisbane band
- Amunda – rock band from Alice Springs
- Banawurun – "outback motown" band
- Beddy Rays – punk rock band from Redland Bay, Queensland, frontman 'Jacko' is a Woppaburra man
- The Black Arm Band – concert band of some of Australia's premier Indigenous musicians
- Black Image – North Queensland band
- Blackfire – rock band from Melbourne
- Blackstorm – rock/blues band from Yuendumu
- Blekbala Mujik (Blackfella Music) – band from Arnhem Land
- Busby Marou – folk country pop band from Rockhampton
- Coloured Stone – rock/reggae group from Ceduna
- The Country Lads – country rock band
- Deadheart – rock/pop band from Geelong
- Dispossessed – Sydney heavy metal band
- Djaambi – band from Melbourne
- The Donovans – country band featuring the Donovan family
- East Journey – rock/reggae band
- Electric Fields – electronic music duo
- Fitzroy Xpress – country rock group from Fitzroy Crossing
- Ilkari Maru – rock band from Central Australia
- Iwantja – rock band from Indulkana, South Australia
- King Stingray – punk rock band, descendents from members of Yothu Yindi
- Kuckles – Broome band featuring Jimmy Chi
- Kulumindini Band – rock band from Elliott, Northern Territory
- Lajamanu Teenage Band – rock band from Lajamanu, Northern Territory
- The Last Kinection – hip-hop group from Newcastle, New South Wales
- Letterstick Band – reggae/rock band from Northeast Arnhem Land
- Local Knowledge – hip hop group from Newcastle, New South Wales
- Lonely Boys – rock band from Ngukurr, Northern Territory
- The Medics – rock band from Cairns, Queensland
- Microwave Jenny – singer-songwriters
- Mills Sisters – band from Torres Strait Islands
- Mixed Relations – reggae, pop, rock and jazz band
- Mop and the Dropouts – Brisbane rock band
- Mulga Bore Hard Rock – Rock band from the desert town of Akaye (Mulga Bore)
- Nabarlek – Indigenous roots band from Arnhem Land
- Native Ryme Syndicate – Brisbane rap group
- No Fixed Address – reggae/ska/rock band from Ceduna
- NoKTuRNL – hip hop/metal group from Alice Springs
- North Tanami Band – reggae/ska band from Lajamanu, Northern Territory
- Ntaria Ladies Choir – choir from Hermannsburg, Northern Territory
- The Pigram Brothers – country/folk group from Broome
- Olive and Eva – vocal duo
- Saltwater Band – Indigenous roots band from Galiwin'ku on Elcho Island
- Scrap Metal – country/reggae band from Broome, Western Australia
- Shakaya – two piece girl group
- Soft Sands – country and gospel band from Galiwin'ku on Elcho Island
- South Summit – Indie rock band from Perth
- South West Syndicate – hip hop group
- Spin.FX – reggae, rock, country band from Papunya, Northern Territory
- Spinifex Gum – adolescent choral ensemble
- Stiff Gins – acoustic group from Sydney
- Stik n Move – hip hop duo
- Street Warriors – hip hop group from Newcastle, New South Wales
- Sunrize Band – rock band from Maningrida
- The Merindas – pop duo
- Thylacine – rock band from Darwin, Northern Territory
- Tiddas – three girl folk band from Victoria, Australia
- Tjimba and the Yung Warriors – hip hop group from Melbourne
- Tjintu Desert Band – desert reggae band
- Tjupi Band – reggae band from Papunya, Northern Territory
- Us Mob – rock band from South Australia
- Warumpi Band – rock/reggae group from Papunya
- The Wilcannia Mob – rap/hip hop group from Wilcannia, New South Wales
- Wild Water – reggae, rock, dub and funk band
- Wildfire Manwurrk – rock band from Central West Arnhem
- Wildflower – rock/reggae band
- Harry and Wilga Williams – country music artists
- Wirrinyga Band – rock band from Milingimbi, Northern Territory
- Yabu Band – desert rock/reggae band
- Yothu Yindi – rock/folk group from Arnhem Land
- Yugul – blues band

== See also ==
- Aboriginal Centre for the Performing Arts
- Aboriginal rock
- Buried Country
- Indigenous Australian music
- Indigenous Australians
- List of Indigenous Australian performing artists
- Vibe Australia
