= Australian reggae =

It is weird and mostly reggae

Reggae is a music genre that originated in Jamaica in the late 1960s. Australia has several bands and sound systems that play reggae music in a style faithful to its expression in Jamaica. Australia has a relatively small Jamaican community, but reggae penetrated local consciousness via the popularity of reggae among the non-Jamaican population of England in the 1960s and 1970s. Many indigenous musicians have embraced reggae, both for its musical qualities and its ethos of resistance. Examples include Mantaka, No Fixed Address, Zennith and Coloured Stone.

== History ==
The first Reggae sound system in Australia was Soulmaker, established in 1972 by J.J. Roberts, a Jamaican from Saint Catherine Parish. Bob Marley & The Wailers toured Australia in 1979, playing Brisbane, Adelaide, Perth, Melbourne and Sydney. Reggae had success on the radio charts in New Zealand in the early 1980s when Toots and the Maytals, the first artist to use the term "reggae" in song, went to number one with their song "Beautiful Woman". One of the first Australian reggae bands was Untabu. The original members of the band came from Trinidad & Tobago, Bruce Mc Clean - guitar and Errol H Renaud - steel pan, lead singer Ras Roni from Barbados, percussionist Jorge Morales from Puerto Rico and Fijians Rupeni Davui - bass, James Purmodh - drums and Joel Knight - keys. They had releases on Larrikin Records and were resident in a number of clubs in the Darlinghurst and Manly area of Sydney. They also toured the East coast regularly. They performed original music and reggae covers. The Aboriginal band No Fixed Address from Adelaide also had reggae songs in their repertoire. In 1981, the Australian band Men at work topped the Australian charts with the reggae-rock song Down Under. The same song topped the New Zealand charts in February 1982. The song topped the Canadian charts in October 1982 and, in the United States, the song debuted on the Billboard Hot 100.

In 1984, Australian label Corroboree Records had its first release with Dangerous Times. This 7" single was recorded at Channel One Studios with the Roots Radics, voiced and mixed at King Tubby's with Bugs as engineer, and voiced by Dudley Green and General Justice. It Contains the song "Dangerous Dub" on the B side, which was mixed by King Tubby. It was released in Jamaica, the UK and Australia. In 1985 Larry Maluma arrived in Australia from Zambia with master tapes recorded in Zambia. He remixed a couple of tracks, Black or White and Chimutima Chako at AAV studios in Melbourne for a 45 single vinyl which was released in 1986 under his own newly formed independent (Safari Music) label. In 1987, two years after his arrival from Zambia Larry Maluma released his first album Confusion on his own Safari Music label. The video clip "Black and White" from the same album was aired on Countdown Revolution and Rock Arena on ABC. Larry Maluma went on to release his 14th album, Ndakondwa (I'm Happy), in 2014.

The first notable dub release in Australia was Ten Dubs That Shook The World by Sheriff Lindo and the Hammer, issued on the artist's own label, Endless Recordings, in 1988. The LP was reissued on the Creative Vibes label with five extra tracks in 1998, and again by EM Records of Japan in 2006, on CD (catalogue number EM1049CD) and LP (EM1049LP), limited to 500 copies. The CD version contains five extra tracks.

Melbourne-based band The Red Eyes released their first live CD in 2003 Live at the Evelyn, following it with two CD EPs, two full-length albums (Rudeworld in 2006 and Red Army in 2010) and the 2011 single Circles before disbanding. Their catalog contains reggae, dub and occasional drum 'n' bass tracks. The band's lead singer El Witeri is Maori, and their work has been remixed by New Zealand dub producer, Deep Fried Dub.

In September 2006, Astronomy Class released Exit Strategy on the record label Elefant Traks. The record fused reggae and hip hop music. In February 2007, Melbourne-based producer Mista Savona released Melbourne Meets Kingston on Elefant Traks. It is a 21-track collaboration with Jamaican singers and deejays such as Anthony B, Determine and Big Youth. In September 2008, the Sydney-based band King Tide released their debut album To our Dearly Deported on the UK label Urban Sedated. The single "No Dog War" was used worldwide by the Sony corporation for their Wag the Dog campaign. The commercial shot in Brazil featured members from the cast of the feature film City of God. In December 2009, Australian artist Matty Woods released The Ras Gong Guerrilla EP, a 10-track recording that tackles Australian and international political issues such as Indigenous sovereignty, climate change and human rights.

Waves of migration to Australia in the late 20th and early 21st centuries have brought musicians from Africa and Asia to Australia, where they have continued to write, record and perform reggae music, sometimes in combination with other more directly African forms of music. In South Australia, Ras Minano is one example, and the dancehall artist Sokel is another. In Melbourne, Ras Jahknow and the Irie Band (which has Sri Lankan roots) are two more examples.

Desert Reggae is a developing contemporary style possibly originating in Central Australia and featuring lyrics often sung in Australian Aboriginal languages. As of 2015, many indigenous Australian artists from the Northern Territory represented by the Aboriginal owned and operated music label CAAMA Music identify as reggae or ska artists (often in combination with rock). Artists include Tjintu Desert Band (previously known as Sunshine Reggae) and Tjupi Band. Some also identify as Desert Reggae artists, with examples including Lajamanu Teenage Band, Rising Wind, Irrunytju Band and Eastern Arrernte Band. Annual music event Bush Bands Bash in Alice Springs features many Desert Reggae bands.

Reggaeton, a music genre that blends reggae, hip hop, and traditional Latin American music, is also popular in Australia. The genre first came to prominence when Puerto Rican reggaeton artist Daddy Yankee released his most notable single, "Gasolina," to Australian radio in 2006. Already a hit worldwide, it reached a peak of No. 12 on the ARIA Singles Chart and was certified Platinum, making it one of the few Spanish-language songs to reach that position on the Australian charts.

== Festivals ==
A range of reggae festivals and festivals highlighting reggae music are held around Australia. Queensland hosts more than any other state, with Reggaetown and Kuranda Roots held near Cairns in far north Queensland, and Good Love (formerly One Love) held at the Gold Coast. Good Love Festival is one of New Zealand's largest and most iconic music events, and made its Australian debut in 2020 headlined by Shaggy and Sean Paul. In 2022, the festival changed its name to Good Love.

In 2016, the first Jamaican Music & Food Festival was held in Melbourne, Victoria featuring reggae and other music of Jamaican origin. Sponsored by PBS and with live performances by Australian artists, bands and DJs, the festival has also featured many international artists including Jamaican reggae singer Bushman, British vocalist General Levy and soul singer Richie Stephens. In 2019 the festival also took place in Sydney, NSW and featured Mad Professor as its headline performer.

Byron Bay Reggaefest started at The Brewery (28.64507°S 153.604697°E; previously known as The Buddha Bar) on 4 December 2010 planned a 2-day festival at Missingham Park, Ballina NSW on 17 & 18 September 2011.

South Beach annual Reggae Party Fremantle Western Australia started in 1998.

=== Former festivals ===
Raggamuffin Music Festival was an annual reggae music festival that toured Australia and New Zealand. The festival postponed in 2017 and has not returned since.

Dub in the Park was an annual festival of dub, roots and world music first held in Adelaide, South Australia in 2016. The festival was discontinued in 2019.

== Radio ==
Notable Australian reggae radio programs of the past include Splashdown and The Pounding System. Australia's longest running reggae radio show is Jamdown Vershun which has been broadcasting on 92.1 FM in Perth with selector General Justice since July 1979. The Jamaican singer, producer, and broadcaster Mikey Dread produced and presented a reggae radio special for 2JJJ in the mid to late 1980s.

In Melbourne, the PBS 106.7FM program "Babylon Burning" (formerly known as "Chant Down Babylon") has been presented by Jesse I since the late 1990s.

Foreigndub ran a weekly radio show in Sydney on 94.5FM – FBI radio every Sunday from 5–7 pm called 'Foreigndub Airways'. They broadcast the show 2010–2019, now moved to 3-5pm Sunday slot on 2SER and stream worldwide.

Every Saturday afternoon, 4ZZZ presents The Yard, a Reggae show from 4-6pm with selecta Basmati (Rhythm Collision Sound)

Every Wednesday Morning 12 am −2am Fresh 92.7 a community station based in Adelaide has a reggae dancehall show called Dancehall & Ting which has aired since July 2012 and is hosted by DJ Ragz.

In 2013 An online radio station, Australia Reggae Radio (ARR) began broadcasting from Melbourne. ARR plays 24-hour Reggae and Dancehall music, 7 days a week. Run by a former Jamaican music executive and current selector and MC, Zare Demus, ARR features a broad range of reggae and dancehall shows from both Australian and international DJs including, but not limited to, Robert Ragz – Dancehall and Ting from Adelaide, Australia; Basmati – The Yard from Brisbane, Australia; Zare Demus – The Zare Demus Show from Melbourne, Australia; Mumma Trees – Jamdown Vershun from Perth, Australia; DJ Septik – Slow Bounce from Brussels, Belgium and Young Lion – Young Lion Show from the UK.

== Chart ==
In 2017 The first-ever chart dedicated to reggae and dancehall music established in Australia by radio presenter DJ Ragz, music producer DJ Wade and Dancehall Reggae Australia.

== Notable artists ==
- Blue King Brown
- Kattimoni
- Nicky Bomba
- Dizzy Dee
- King Tide
- Mista Savona
- Errol H Renaud
- Ras Roni
- Pat Powell
- DJ Astro Black
- Ras Jahknow

== Australian releases ==
Singles
Artist	Title	Label	Format	Release year
Pressure Drop	Reggae Riot’ b/w ‘Jah	EMI	7”	1979
Leon De Castro's Babylon	Suspicious Minds' b/w 'Hindley Street	Warner Brothers	7"	1979
Cassava	27 years' b/w 'Stir It Up	EMI		1980
Un Tabu	Open Your Eyes' b/w 'Dem Coming Down	Larrikin	EP	1980
Igniters	Ignition' 'Rubby Dub' b/w 'More Flaming Dub' 'Kent Street Skank	Larrikin	EP	1981
Joe Dolce	Reggae Matilda’ b/w ‘Stick It Out	Ariola 103683	7”	1981
The Allniters	She Made a Monkey Out of Me / Allniters Are Alrighters / She Drives Me Around the Bend	Larrikin/Green	7”	1981
Us Mob/No Fixed Address	Wrong Side of the Road	Soundtrack		1981
Strange Tenants	Something Like That / She Asked Me / Soldier Boy / Ground Point Zero	Bluebeat	12”	1982
No Fixed Address	From My Eyes	Rough Diamond/Astor/PolyGram	EP	1982
The Leftovers	The Lemonade Song’ ‘Double Bay’ ‘Yay Al	Method	7”	1983
The All Nighters	D-D-D-Dance with the Allniters	Powderworks	LP	1983
Strange Tenants	Take One Step/Two Steps Back / Grey Skies / Killer Zombies / Mr & Mrs	Bluebeat	12”	1983
Strange Tenants	I Work At My Machine’ b/w ‘The Firm	Bluebeat	LP	1984
Strange Tenants	Movin' In	Bluebeat	LP	1984
Vegimite Reggae	Trendy Ex-Hippies	Confidential Records	LP	1984
Vegimite Reggae	Send it Out’ b/w ‘Faces	Confidential Records	7”	1984
Club Ska	Black ‘n’ White’ b/w ‘Club Dub	Powderworks	7”	1986
Club Ska	Cupid’ b/w ‘Bottom End	Powderworks	7”	1986
Club Ska	On The Road’ b/w ‘Beside	Beat E Records/Creole Records	7”	1987
Sheriff Lindo and the Hammer	10 Dubs That Shook The World	Endless Recordings ER001	LP	1988
Joe Geia	Yil Lull	Gammin Records	LP	1988
Spy Vs Spy	Working Week (Dub Mix)	WEA	12”	1988
Vegimite Reggae	Too Many Years' b/w 'Love is Gone	M.A.X. Records 7" 1989	7”	1989
The Latenotes	Hallelujah Ska	Unicorn Records	CD	1990
Fraction	Tribute to Bob and Peter' b/w 'Good Times	Rainbow Wirl 12" 1991	12”	1991
Kate Ceberano and MC Kye	Satisfied	Regular Records 12" 1991	12”	1991
The Rockmelons feat. Kye	Bubble & Squeak' from 'Form One Planet	Mushroom	CD	1992
Mixed Relations	Love	Polydor	CD	1993
Christine Anu with Paul Kelly	Last Train	White Records	CD	1993
Dub Congress + Starman	Red Pepper	Self-published	CD	1993
Mixed Relations	Love	Polydor	CD	1993
Bellydance	One Blood	Regular/Festival	CD	1993
Kev Carmody & Tiddas	Sorry Business	Dub Mix	CD	1993
The Natural Mystics	Natural Creation	Self-published	CD	1994
Various	Tribal Heart	AIM	CD	1994
Starman	Wizzdom	Wizzdom Productions	CD	1995
Hoopsnake	Outta My System	rooArt	CD	1995
Sacred Sound System feat. Kye	Mantra Mix	Mushroom	CD	1996
Wicked Beat Sound System	Music from the Core	One Movement	CD	1996
Sheriff Lindo and the Hammer	Ten Dubs That Shook The World: Ten Dubs Ten Years On	Creative Vibes	CD	1998
Backy Skank	Introducing Backy Skank	MGM CD EP	CD	1998
Bellydance	Babylon Mixed Business	Road Show	CD	1998
Danny Rankin’	Zenith	Self published	CD	1998
Various	Dub for the Masses Vol. 1	Creative Vibes	CD	1999
Jeff Dread	The Merchant of Dub	Creative Vibes	CD	1999
Dubble Dub	Deadly Headly	Head Records	CD	2000
Various	Dub for the Masses Vol. 2	Creative Vibes	CD	2001
Backy Skank	Suited and Booted	Maximum	CD	2003
George Rrurrambu	Nerbu Message	Skinnyfish	CD	2004
Mista Savona	Mr Savona Presents Invasion Day	Mr Savona	CD	2004
Secret Masters	The Lost Dub Tapes	Master Tunes	CD	2004
King Tide	To Our Dearly Deported	Vitamin Records	CD	2005
Budspells	Inna Sense	Ruffage Records	CD	2005
Rastawookie	Rastawookie	Self-published	CD	2005
Hot Rubber Glove	Inna Rubba Dub Manor	Rudekat Records	CD	2005
King Tide	Scared New World	Vitamin Records	CD	2006
Blue King Brown	Stand Up	Roots Level Records	CD	2006
Resurrectors	Healing	Future Classic	CD	2006
Various	Island Time	Rudekat Records	CD	2006
Dubmarine	Dub Deep	Rudekat Records	CD	2006
The Red Eyes	Rude World	?	CD	2006
Rastawookie	Perfectly Ordinary	Pollyannaism Polly	CD	2007
Mista Savona	Mista Savona Presents Melbourne Meets Kingston	Elefant Traks	CD	2007
Various	Island Time 2	Rudekat Records	CD	2007
Zennith	I Like It	Zennith	CD	2007
Rumpunch	Sucklin’	Rumpunch	CD	2008
Errol H Renaud	Live	Eman music	CD	2008
Fyah Walk	Sunrise Red	Roots and Stream Productions/Vitamin	CD	2009
King Tide	Roots Pop Reggae	Vitamin records	CD	2009
Various	Champion Sound Sampler Vol. 1	Champion Sound	CD	2009
Elephant Wise	The Reasoning	Dasvibes	CD / Digital	2009
Raz Bin Sam	Life is a Gift	Dasvibes	CD / Digital	2009
Raz Bin Sam	Own This Life	Dasvibes	CD / Digital	2009
Sub-Tribe & The 4'20' Sound	Dub Road	Sub-Tribe	Vinyl / Digital	2020
Errol H Renaud	TBR	Eman music	CD	2011
The Strides	The Strides	Earshift Records	CD	2009
Errol H Renaud	Free	Eman music	CD	2017
Budspells	Nomadik Souls	Vitamin	CD	2009
Fyah Walk	Ocean Sounds	Roots and Stream Productions/Vitamin	CD	2009
Grace Barbé	Kreol Daughter	MGM	CD	2008
Secret Masters	Words	Power	CD	2009

== See also ==
- Music of Australia
