= From the Bush =

Compilation album by Various artists
- Released: 1990
- Label: CAAMA

From the Bush is a compilation album of Australian Indigenous bands released in Australia by CAAMA in 1990. It was nominated for a 1991 ARIA Award for Best Indigenous Release.

Rough Guides calls it "a fine introduction to the contemporary music of Central Australia's desert regions and sparse townships." Penelope Layland writing in the Canberra Times gave it a mostly negative review, saying most of the album was "fairly standard music" and "run-of-the-mill musical forms" but noting the better songs "those which incorporate at least some elements of traditional Aboriginal music or traditional instrumentation".

== Accolades ==
Year	Award	Nomination	Result
1991	ARIA Music Awards	Best Indigenous Release	Nominated

== Track listing ==
1. Don't worry just be happy – Blekbala Mujik
2. Tjana anu wilurara – Chrysophrase
3. Hermannsburg Mountain – Irwin Inkamala & the Country lads
4. Mardaka nyanu – North Tanami Band
5. She's my sister – Daryl Smith
6. Seasons coming – Areyonga Desert Tigers
7. Tjitji tjuta wankanyi – Titjikala Desert Oaks Band
8. To leave this young black girl – Wairuk Band
9. We’re the Wedgetail Eagles – Wedgetail Eagle Band
10. Pitjantjatjara Boy Like Me – Isaac Yamma
11. Pitulu (Petrol) – Punch Thompson
12. Mount Doreen – Western Desert Band
13. Blackmans crying – Frank Yamma
14. Alice don't grow so fast – Amunda
15. Dreamtime blues – Bill Wellington
16. I'm telling you – Irwin Inkamala & the Country Lads
17. Black Boy – Wedgetail Eagle Band
18. Lajamanu – North Tanami Band
19. Nitmiluk – Blekbala Mujik

Tracks 1,4,9,12,16,18 and 19 only appear on the cd version.
