= Deadly Awards 2006 =

Australian Aboriginal and Torres Strait Islander annual music awards

The Deadlys Awards was an annual celebration of Australian Aboriginal and Torres Strait Islander achievement in music, sport, entertainment and community.

== Music ==
- Most Promising New Talent in Music: Sharnee Fenwick
- Single Release of the Year: Lonesome But Free - Troy Cassar-Daley
- Album Release of the Year: Under the Mango Tree - The Pigram Brothers
- Band of the Year: Troy n Trevlyn & The Tribe
- Music Artist of the Year: Troy Cassar-Daley
- Jimmy Little Award for Lifetime Achievement in Aboriginal and Torres Strait Music: Roger Knox
- Excellence in Film & Theatrical Score: David Milroy – Windmill Baby

== Sport ==
- Most Promising New Talent in Sport: Patrick Mills
- Outstanding Achievement in AFL: Adam Goodes
- Outstanding Achievement in Rugby League: Johnathan Thurston
- Male Sportsperson of the Year: Anthony Mundine
- Ella Award for Lifetime Achievement in Aboriginal and Torres Strait Islander Sport: Lloyd McDermott
- Female Sportsperson of the Year Lydia Williams

== The arts ==
- Dancer of the Year: Patrick Thaiday
- Outstanding Achievement in Film and Television: Peter Djiggir, Ten Canoes
- Outstanding Achviement in Literature: Kylie Belling, Gary Foley and John Harding – The Dirty Mile, a History of Indigenous Fitzroy
- Outstanding Achievement in Entertainment: Mark Olive
- Visual Artist of the Year: Gulumbu Yunupingu
- Actor of the Year: Jamie Gulpilil

== Community ==
- DEST Award for Outstanding Achievement in Aboriginal and Torres Strait Islander Education: Stan Grant
- Outstanding Achievement in Aboriginal and Torres Strait Islander Health: Mick Adams
- Broadcaster of the Year: Paulette Whitton, Koori Radio, Sydney NSW
- New Apprentice of the Year Nicole Zimmerman
