= Deadly Awards 2007 =

Australian Aboriginal and Torres Strait Islander annual music awards

The 2007 Deadly Awards took place at the Sydney Opera House Concert Hall. Featured guests included many people associated with the 1967 Referendum. Guest performances included Jessica Mauboy, Casey Donovan, Lou Bennett, Michael Tuahine and Kutcha Edwards, and several South Sydney Rabbitohs. The awards were an annual celebration of Australian Aboriginal and Torres Strait Islander achievement in music, sport, entertainment and community.

== Winners ==
=== Music ===
- Most Promising New Talent in Music: Sharon-Lee Lane
- Single Release of the Year: "Your Love is Like A Song" - Dan Sultan
- Album Release of the Year: Cannot Buy My Soul - Kev Carmody
- Band of the Year: Black Image
- Artist of the Year: Jessica Mauboy
- Jimmy Little Lifetime Achievement Award for Contribution to Aboriginal and Torres Strait Islander Music: Jimmy Little
- APRA Song of the Year: "Going Back Home" - Troy Cassar-Daley

=== Sport ===
- Most Promising New Talent in Sport: Dale Richards
- Outstanding Achievement in AFL: Lance Franklin
- Outstanding Achievement in Rugby League: Johnathan Thurston
- Male Sportsperson of the Year: Anthony Mundine
- Female Sportsperson of the Year: Rohanee Cox
- The Ella Lifetime Achievement Award for Contribution to Aboriginal and Torres Strait Islander Sport: David Peachey

=== The arts ===
- Dancer of the Year: Elma Kris
- Outstanding Achievement in Film, Television or Theatre: Richard Frankland, Director of The Circuit
- Outstanding Achievement in Literature: Dr Anita Heiss - Not Meeting Mr Right
- Outstanding Achievement in Entertainment: Luke Carroll and Catherine Freeman - Going Bush
- Male Actor of the Year: Aaron Pedersen
- Female Actor of the Year: Deborah Mailman
- Visual Artist of the Year: Dennis Nona

=== Community ===
- Outstanding Achievement in Aboriginal and Torres Strait Islander Education: Gavin Khan
- Outstanding Achievement in Aboriginal and Torres Strait Islander Health: Gracelyn Smallwood
- Broadcaster of the Year: Sandy Dann
- Apprentice or Trainee of the Year: Margaret Ross
- Young Leader of the Year: Tania Major, winner of the 2007 Young Australian of the year.
