= Deadly Awards 1999 =

These are the winners of The Deadly Awards in 1999. The Deadly Awards were an annual celebration of Australian Aboriginal and Torres Strait Islander achievement in music, sport, entertainment and community.

== Music ==
- Excellence in Film or Theatrical Score: Tiddas & Alister Jones: My Island Home
- Outstanding Contribution to Aboriginal Music: Coloured Stone
- Most Promising New Talent: Rochelle Watson
- Male Artist of the Year: Jimmy Little
- Female Artist of the Year: Leah Purcell
- Album Release of the Year: Frank Yamma & Piranpa: Playing with Fire
- Band of the Year: Yothu Yindi
- Single Release of the Year: Jimmy Little: "The Way You Make Me Feel"

== Community ==
- Aboriginal Broadcaster of the Year: Rehanna Coulthard 5UMA
