= Lists of Indigenous people =

== North America / Turtle Island ==
- Native American people by occupation
- First Nations people by occupation

=== Academics ===
- First Nations academics
- Indigenous Canadian women academics
- Native American academics

=== Activists ===
- First Nations activists
- First Nations lawyers
- Native American activists
- Indigenous leaders in British Columbia

=== Artists ===
- List of Native American artists
- Professional Native Indian Artists Inc. (The "Indigenous Group of Seven")

=== Authors ===
- First Nations women writers
- 19th-century First Nations writers
- 20th-century First Nations writers
- 21st-century First Nations writers

=== Inventors and scientists ===
- List of Alaska Native inventors and scientists

== The Americas ==
- Indigenous people of the Americas by occupation

=== Academics ===
- Indigenous academics of the Americas

=== Authors ===
- List of Indigenous writers of the Americas

== Europe and Russia ==
- List of Sámi people
- Notable Nenets (the Nenets are Indigenous people in Siberia)

== Australasia (Australia and Aotearoa) ==
Lists of Indigenous Australians by occupation and/or historical contribution:

- List of Indigenous Australian historical figures
- List of Indigenous Australian musicians
- List of Indigenous Australian performing artists
- List of Indigenous Australians in politics and public service, education, law and humanities
- List of Indigenous Australian sportspeople
  - List of Indigenous Australian VFL/AFL and AFL Women's players
- List of Indigenous Australian visual artists
- List of Indigenous Australian writers
