= Dispossessed =

Dispossessed may refer to:

- The Dispossessed, a 1974 novel by Ursula K. Le Guin
- Dispossessed: The Ordeal of the Palestinians 1917–1980, a 1980 history book by David Gilmour
- Dispossessed (band), an Australian heavy metal band active in 2015–2019

== See also ==
- Eviction
