= Risan (surname) =

Risan is a surname. Notable people with the surname include:

- Hank Risan (born 1955), American business executive, scientist, and creator of digital media rights and security patents
- Knut Risan (1930–2011), Norwegian actor
- Leidulv Risan (born 1948), Norwegian screenwriter, film director and professor
