= The Lost Islands =

Australian television series

- Main title screen
- Starring: Tony Hughes; Jane Vallis; Robert Edgington; Amanda Ma; Chris Benaud; Margaret Nelson; Rodney Bell; Ric Hutton; Ron Haddrick; Ron Blanchard; Wallas Eaton; Willie Fennell; Cornelia Frances; Frank Gallacher; Michael Howard; Don Pascoe
- Country of origin: Australia
- Original language: English
- No. of seasons: 1
- No. of episodes: 26

Production
- Running time: 26 x 30 minute episodes
- Production companies: Paramount Television; Network 10

Original release
- Network: The 0-10 Network
- Release: 1 January – 1 December 1976

The Lost Islands is an Australian television series which first aired in Australia on Network Ten. It later screened around the world, including the United Kingdom, France, West Germany, Italy, The Netherlands, Greece (and various other parts of Europe), as well as Israel, New Zealand, South Africa, Sri Lanka, Canada and the United States.

== Plot ==
A hurricane nearly sinks the United World, a sailing ship holding 40 teenagers from all around the world. Most of them flee the ship in lifeboats, but the evacuating children are not counted, and five are left behind. The storm blows the battered ship across a reef into the lagoon of an uncharted island.

The island, Tambu, is ruled by a supposedly 200-year-old immortal tyrant called "Q", who came to the island on one of several ships originally bound for New Holland. In the centre of the island is a valley in which the descendants of the original ship still live, in the manner of an 18th-century colonial community. Adjacent to Tambu is a smaller island, Malo, which is a barren wasteland. It is noteworthy because of a lagoon where prisoners are forced to dive for a "blue weed" which, according to the people of Tambu, is refined into a powder which the Q uses to extend his life.

The five children befriend a local family, the Quinns, who help them remain hidden on the island in a swamp avoided by locals because it is, according to local myth, inhabited by the ghosts of the dead. Most of the episode storylines pit the children against the Q, who fears their knowledge of the outside world is a threat to his dominion of Tambu.

In the final episode, the children do not escape the lost islands but instead remain stranded. As the end credits begin, they are seen celebrating the liberation of the village from the tyrant "Q", who has retreated into exile on the far tip of the island, plotting his revenge.

== Production history ==
Unlike most Australian television series of the time, which were either entirely produced by a TV network, or a TV network in association with a local production company, The Lost Islands was a co-production between the Australian Network 10 and a US studio, Paramount Pictures. Both have been owned by Paramount Global since 2019.

Three early episodes were edited together to make a 35mm feature film released in Australia in December 1975.

Most of the series was considered lost until investigation work by French producer Gilles de Nanterre compiled prints stored in four continents, before ending up in a warehouse in the United States, where all 26 episodes were stored, in order to assemble the French DVD release in 2005.

== Cast ==
=== Protagonists ===
- Tony Hughes as Tony, an Australian and orphan.
- Jane Vallis as Anna, a German.
- Robert Edgington as David, an American.
- Amanda Ma as Su Yin, a Chinese person.
- Chris Benaud as Mark, a Brit.

=== The People of Tambu/The "Q-People" ===
- Margaret Nelson as Helen Margaret Quinn.
- Rodney Bell as Aaron James Quinn, Helen's younger brother.
- Michael Howard as Jason Quinn, Helen's older brother.
- Ron Haddrick as The Q, the tyrant of Tambu.
- Ric Hutton as Rufus Quad, Q's prime minister.
- Willie Fennell as Jeremiah Quizzel, a friend of the Quinns and Q's personal servant.
- Cornelia Frances as Elizabeth Quinn, Helen's mother.
- Don Pascoe as Adam Quinn, Helen's father.
- Frank Gallacher and Ron Blanchard as Quig and Quell, Quad's henchmen.
- Harry Lawrence as the Hermit, an escaped prisoner from Malo and a former friend of Adam Quinn.
- Harold Hopkins as Thomas Quick, one of Q's guards who befriends the children after Su Yin saves his life.
- Wallas Eaton as school headmaster Quilter.
- Kent Strickland as Quimby, the village brat.
- Dianne Berryman as Bess, the Q's ward who befriends Tony.

=== Modern World people ===
- Peter Adams as Jimmy Williams, a pilot who was stranded on Tambu when his plane crashed in episode 8.
- Peter Sumner as Christian Dobler, a German sailor and school teacher who is stranded on Tambu in episode 16 and also appears in episode 17.

== DVD releases ==
The Lost Islands was released on DVD by the French company Les Héros de la Lucarne (as L'ile Perdue in both French and English) and by the German company PIDAX Film (as Die verlorenen Inseln in both German and English).

== Cult status in Israel ==
The series was broadcast many times during the 70s and 80s in the only TV channel that existed then in Israel, airing in the strand given to Israeli Educational Television, usually airing during summer holidays. It had achieved cult status in Israel, which is shown in a 2008 Israeli feature film that is named after it.
