= Airileke =

- Born: Airileke David Ingram; Australia
- Genres: World; dub reggae; hip hop
- Occupations: Musician; producer
- Instruments: Drums (garamuts); percussion

Airileke "Airi" David Ingram, also referred to mononymously as Airileke, is a Papua New Guinean-Australian musician and producer. His album Weapon of Choice (October 2012) was nominated at the ARIA Music Awards of 2013 for Best World Music Album.

== Biography ==
Ingram was born in Australia, his family comes from a village, Gabagaba, Central Province, Papua New Guinea and he is of Melanesian descent. He grew up in both PNG and Darwin, Northern Territory. He learnt traditional drumming techniques from his grandfather. Ingram joined the Australian Youth Orchestra as a percussionist for a world tour. As a drummer and/or percussionist, he has performed with or been a member of Drum Drum, Telek, Bart Willoughby, Wild Water, Gurrumul, Yothu Yindi, Tribe of Jubal and Grrilla Step.

Drum Drum is the English translation for Gabagaba, and the group, which is based in Darwin, is led by Tau Ingram on lead vocals. As of August 2006 the line-up was Airi Ingram on keyboards, percussion, vocals and dance; Phillip Eaton on bass guitar, percussion, dance and vocals; Julia Gray on dance and vocals; Anna Ingram (née Faehse) on vocals, violin and percussion, Paia Ingram on vocals, dance and percussion; Tau Ingram on lead vocals, dance and percussion; Aiva Kadiba on dance, percussion and vocals and Mark Smith on drum kit and percussion. Previous members include Ranu James on percussion.

In 2006 Ingram and David Bridie established the Wantok Musik Foundation. With Tania Nugent he formed Makoda, which directed the opening and closing ceremonies of the Pacific Games, held in 2015. In support of the West Papua Independence movement he co-wrote, recorded and issued the single, "Sorong Samarai" (2016) with the movement's leader, Benny Wenda.

== Discography ==
=== Albums ===
Title	Details	Peak positions
Title	Details	AUS
Weapon of Choice	Released: 15 October 2012; Label: Birds Robe Records /MGM W0009; Formats: CD	—

== Awards and nominations ==
=== ARIA Music Awards ===
The ARIA Music Awards is an annual awards ceremony that recognises excellence, innovation, and achievement across all genres of Australian music. They commenced in 1987.

Year	Nominee / work	Award	Result	Ref.
2013	Weapon of Choice	Best World Music Album	Nominated	

=== Music Victoria Awards ===
The Music Victoria Awards are an annual awards night celebrating Victorian music. They commenced in 2006.

Year	Nominee / work	Award	Result
2013	Airileke	Best Global or Reggae Act	Nominated
