= Banawurun =

Australian band

- Origin: Brisbane, Queensland, Australia
- Years active: 2004-present
- Members: Troy Brady; Trevelyn Brady; Myka Wallace; Josef Muller; Sol Carroll

Banawurun is a band from Brisbane, Queensland. Their music has been described as "outback Motown". They started in 2004 as a duo of Troy Brady and Trevelyn Brady. They expanded and became Troy n Trevelyn & The Tribe and changed their name in 2007 to Banawurun (which means running water). Troy and Trevelyn had previously worked together in a band called Velocity. Banawurun played in the US in 2006, performing in Los Angeles's Viper Room. They won a Deadly in 2007 for Band of the Year. Their single "Power to the People" was also nominated for a Deadly. Troy Brady is a former member of Aim 4 More.

== Discography ==
- Power to the People (2007)
- Stone Cold (2007)
- Insanity (2007)
