= HotSpell =

Australian spelling bee TV series

- Genre: Game show
- Written by: Justine Flynn; Steve Rothwell
- Directed by: Jennifer Cummins
- Presented by: Michael Tuahine
- Composer: Nerida Tyson-Chew
- Country of origin: Australia
- Original language: English
- No. of series: 1
- No. of episodes: 10

Production
- Producers: Jennifer Cummins; Justine Flynn
- Running time: 30 minutes

Original release
- Network: SBS
- Release: 24 August – 2 September 2007

HotSpell is an Australian game show, in which children competed against each other in a Spelling bee competition Hosted by Michael Tuahine, it was broadcast in 2007. Chosen from over 1000 applicants 20 children aged from 9 to 13 competed over a series of ten episodes. It consisted of three rounds, first each contestant is asked to spell four increasingly difficult words, then a timed round trying to spell as many words as possible then finally a round where contestants buzz in for the chance to try spell a word.

Debi Enker in the Age wrote "It might be laudable as an exercise in making good spelling seem exciting but as viewing it's fairly d-u-l-l."
