= Djolpa McKenzie =

- Birth name: Paul Djolpa McKenzie
- Genres: Reggae, rock, dub, funk
- Occupation: Teacher
- Instrument: Vocals

Paul Djolpa McKenzie is a musician and educator from Maningrida, Australia in the Arnhem Land.

McKenzie is a VET teacher at Maningrida Community Education Centre. In 2008 he received a Deadly Award for Outstanding Achievement in Aboriginal and Torres Strait Islander Education.

McKenzie fronts Wild Water, a band which plays a mix of reggae, rock, dub and funk. He sings in Brarra, Kriol and English. Wild Water has toured nationally And released two albums, Baltpa (1996) and Rrawa (2007).

McKenzie was a part of The Black Arm Band, performing in their Hidden Republic and dirtsong shows.
