= Marcia Hathaway =

Australian actress

Marcia Nellie Hathaway (1930 - 28 January 1963) was an Australian actress. Hathaway worked extensively in theatre and on Sydney radio, and appeared in the 1960 film Shadow of the Boomerang She died after being attacked by a Bull shark in shallow water at Sugarloaf Bay, Middle Harbour, Sydney, on 28 January, 1963.

== Select credits ==
- Shadow of the Boomerang (1960 film)
- Harlequinade (1961 film)
- Smugglers Beware (1963 TV series)
