= Shadow of the Boomerang =

1960 film

- Directed by: Dick Ross
- Written by: Dick Ross; John Ford
- Produced by: Dick Ross
- Starring: Georgia Lee; Dickie Jones; Jimmy Little
- Cinematography: Mark McDonald; James B. Drought
- Edited by: Irvin Berlin
- Music by: Ralph Carmichael
- Production company: World Wide Pictures
- Distributed by: MGM
- Release date: 17 August 1961
- Running time: 98 minutes
- Country: Australia
- Language: English
- Budget: £75,000

Shadow of the Boomerang is a 1960 Australian drama film directed by Dick Ross and written by Dick Ross and John Ford. It is a 'Christian Western' about a cattle station manager who learns to overcome his prejudice against aboriginals.

== Plot ==
An American brother and sister, Bob and Kathy Prince, have come to Australia to manage a cattle station owned by their father. Bob is prejudiced against aboriginals. He refuses to let stockman Johnny attend Billy Graham's 1959 crusade of Australia. However Johnny is fatally gored to death after saving Bob from being attacked by a boar. Bob overcomes his prejudice.

== Cast ==
- Georgia Lee as Kathy Prince
- Dickie Jones as Bob Prince
- Jimmy Little as Johnny
- Marcia Hathaway as Penny
- Ken Frazer as stockman
- Keith Buckley as stockman
- Vaughan Tracey as Doctor Cornell
- Billy Graham as Himself
- Hugh Sanders
- Maurice Manson
- Orville Sherman
- Vicky Simms

== Production ==
The film was inspired by Billy Graham's 1959 crusade and was made by World Wide Pictures, the film arm of the Billy Graham Evangelistic Association.

In October 1959, the American director, Dick Ross, and stars arrived in Sydney. Ross co-wrote the script with Australian author John Ford. Filming started in November and mostly took place near Camden. The movie was made with funds raised during the crusade and took 25 days to shoot.

The film starred Marcia Hathaway, who was killed by a shark in 1963. She had become a born again Christian during Billy Graham's visit to Australia in 1959. She is the last person to date to be killed by a shark in Sydney Harbour.

Aboriginal singer Jimmy Little made his film debut in this movie.
