= Tony Hughes (actor) =

Australian actor and singer

- Occupations: Actor, musician
- Years active: 1970–present

Tony Hughes is a British-born Australian actor and singer. As an actor, he starred in The Lost Islands (1976), Chopper Squad (1977–1979) and the film adaptation of Puberty Blues (1981). As a singer he has fronted Bellydance and King Tide.

Hughes was born in England and moved to Australia at age 12. He moved into acting in the 1970s, first appearing in an episode of The Rovers. He then appeared in the entire The Lost Islands and Chopper Squad series. He made his first feature film appearance in a small part in My Brilliant Career. He was then a major cast member of Puberty Blues. After a few more small parts he moved into music, playing with Bellydance until they disbanded and then forming King Tide.

== Filmography ==
=== Television ===
- The Rovers (1 episode)
- Whodunnit? as Shaun Connor (1 episode)
- The Lost Islands (1976) as Tony (26 episodes)
- Chopper Squad (1977–79) as Tim Gray (27 episodes)

=== Film ===
- My Brilliant Career (1979) as Peter McSwatt
- Puberty Blues (1981) as Danny
