= Messenger (Jimmy Little album) =

Studio album by Jimmy Little
- Released: June 1999
- Studio: Karma County Studios and Festival Studios
- Length: 48:56
- Label: Festival
- Producer: Brendan Gallagher

Jimmy Little chronology
Yorta Yorta Man (1997)	Messenger (1999)	Resonate (2002)

Messenger is a studio album by Australian musician Jimmy Little. The album was released in June 1999 and peaked at number 26 on the ARIA Charts.

At the ARIA Music Awards of 1999, the album won the ARIA Award for Best Adult Contemporary Album.

== Track listing ==
1. "Down Below" (Dan Rumour, Jim Elliott, Tex Perkins) – 4:26
2. "Under the Milky Way" (Steve Kilbey, The Church) – 4:57
3. "Way I Made You Feel (Ed Kuepper) – 4:50
4. "Randwick Bells" (Paul Kelly) – 3:25
5. "Quasimodo's Dream" (Dave Mason) – 5:26
6. "Into Temptation" (Neil Finn) – 4:49
7. "Cattle and Cane" (Grant McLennan, Robert Forster) – 4:23
8. "(Are You) The One That I've Been Waiting For" (Nick Cave) – 4:08
9. "Black Fella/White Fella" (George Rrurrambu, Neil Murray) – 4:25
10. "Alone with You" (Jeremy Oxley) – 4:23
11. "Bring Yourself Home to Me" (Mark Snarski) – 3:44

== Charts ==
Chart performance for Messenger
Chart (1999)	Peak position
Australian Albums (ARIA)	26

== Certification ==
Certifications for Messenger
Region	Certification	Certified units/sales
Australia (ARIA)	Gold	35,000^{^}
^{^} Shipments figures based on certification alone.
