= Microwave Jenny =

Australian musical group

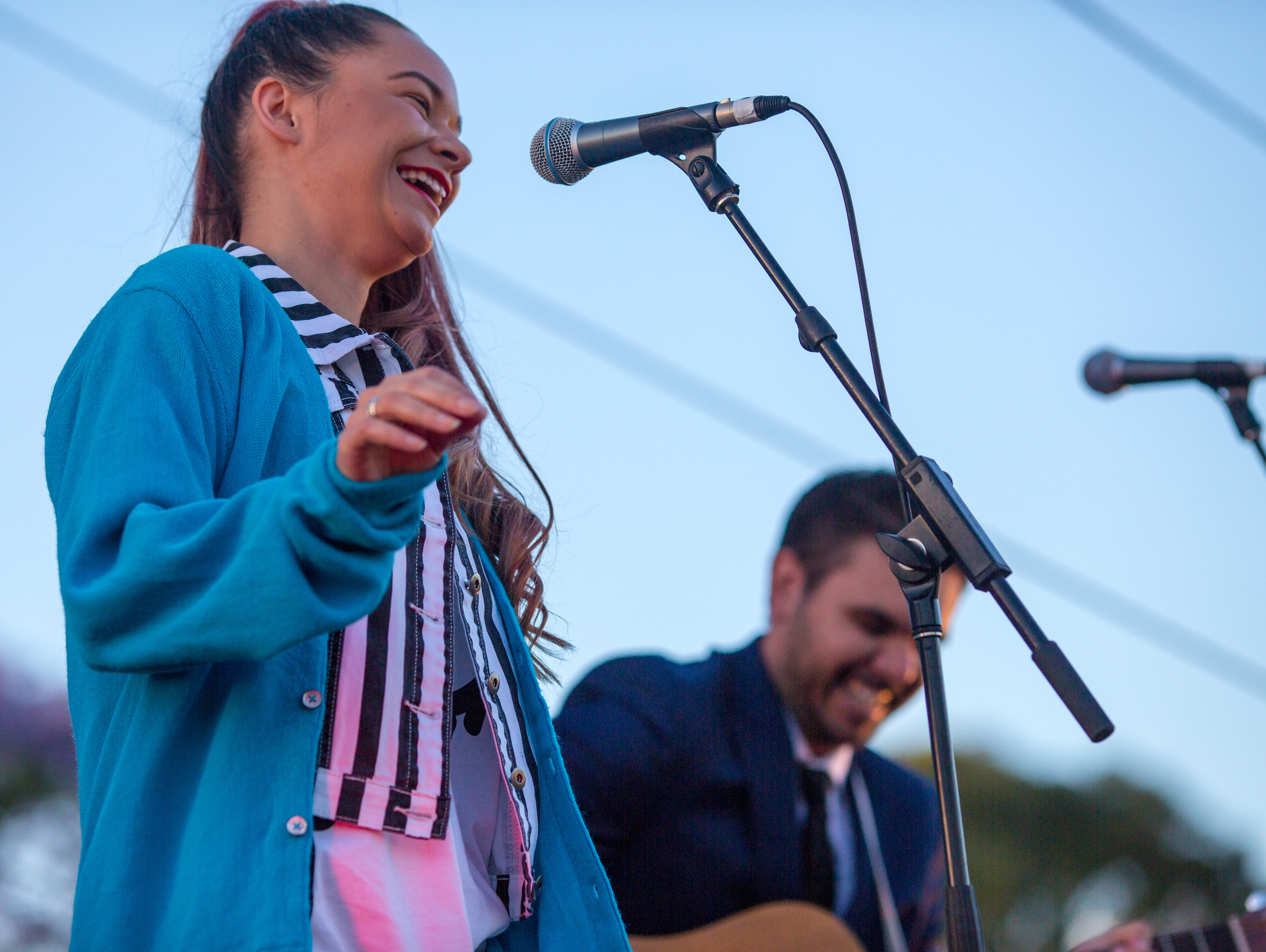
Microwave Jenny, October 2013

Microwave Jenny is an Australian pop/folk/jazz duet that consists of Tessa Nuku on vocals and Brendon Boney on guitar and vocals. They both have Indigenous backgrounds with Brendon having been born and raised in Wagga Wagga, and Tessa having been born in Ulladulla, New South Wales before moving to and growing up in Umina Beach, New South Wales Brendon was the singing voice for the character Willie in film Bran Nue Dae. The phrase 'Microwave Jenny' comes from the 1997 film The Castle. The duo are married and have a daughter. Brendon has a solo alternative, hip/hop project called The Magpie Swoop.

== Live performance ==
The band play live in multiple formats either as an Acoustic Duet, Trio, Quartet or full band. The duo feature heavily on the Australian music festival circuit with notable live performances including Bluesfest, Woodford Folk Festival, Peats Ridge Festival and Nannup Music Festival.

They also supported Thirsty Merc on their 2011 national tour of Australia.

== Influences ==
Microwave Jenny have cited James Taylor, Janis Ian, Bill Withers and Van Morrison as musical influences.

== Awards and nominations ==
They were recipients of the 2009 Peter Garrett Breathrough Grant. Brendon won an APRA Professional Development Award in 2011 for his songwriting and composing. In 2009, Microwave Jenny was nominated for a Deadly Award for Most Promising New Artist but did not win.

== Discography ==
They have released two EPs

=== Summer ===
1. "Mellow" – 3:59 2. "Mr Man in the Moon" – 3:47 3. "I'll Never Learn" – 5:02 4. "Summer" – 3:35

=== Crazy, Crazy Things ===
1. "Stuck on the Moon" – 3:06 2. "Homemade Lemonade" – 3:52 3. "Lyin" – 3:18 4. Locked in the Closet" – 3:54
