= Bellydance (band) =

Australian band

- Also known as: Bellydance Disco
- Origin: Sydney, New South Wales, Australia
- Genres: Dance; funk; soul; reggae
- Years active: 1987–1996
- Labels: Regular/Festival; Roadshow
- Past members: Ted Cavanagh; Tony Hughes; Scott Saunders; Frank Ward; Charlie MacLean; John Swanton; Linda Jannsen; Grant Taylor; Dave Wray; Richard Barry; Terepai Richmond; Theo Silvera

Bellydance were an Australian 9 piece dance, funk band originally known as Bellydance Disco, which formed in Sydney 1987. Mainstays were Tony Hughes on vocals, Frank Ward on bass, Ted Cavanagh on guitar and Scott Saunders (also in Directions in Groove) on keyboards. Featured a range of musicians/vocalists and brass. Their debut album, One Blood (1993), was nominated at the ARIA Music Awards of 1994 for Best Pop Release.

== History ==
Bellydance were formed as a dance, funk band, Bellydance Disco, in Sydney in 1987 by mainstays Ted Cavanagh on guitar, the actor, Tony Hughes on vocals, and Scott Saunders (ex-Deckchairs Overboard, Beatfish) on keyboards. Their line-up changed often and the ensemble sometimes reached 12 members. The group's debut single, "Spittin' Bullets", appeared in July 1987.

According to Australian musicologist, Ian McFarlane, they "built up a strong following on the Sydney dance/pub circuit, and first came to national prominence with the release of the topical single 'Green Revolution' in mid-1992." By that time Saunders had also formed an acid jazz group, Directions in Groove (initially styled as d.i.g.), with Alexander Hewetson on bass guitar, Terepai Richmond on drums, Rick Robertson on saxophone, and Tim Rollinson on guitar. They released an extended play, Fun Dopin', in May 1993 and also supported visiting English reggae singer, Maxi Priest, on his tour of Australia.

Bellydance issued their debut studio album, One Blood, in October 1993 via Regular Records/Festival Records. It had been recorded in the previous year with Stephen Ferris producing. McFarlane observed, "[it] contained a mix of hard funk, smooth soul-pop, dub reggae and jazz-funk." At the ARIA Music Awards of 1994 it was nominated for Best Pop Release. The group released "The Joker" in 1994 and followed with their second album, Babylon Mixed Business, late in the next year, via Roadshow Music. "Ain't no Use" was released in November 1995 and the group disbanded in 1996.

== Band members ==
- Ted Cavanagh – guitar (1987–96)
- Tony Hughes – vocals (1987–96)
- Scott Saunders – keyboards (1987–96)
- Frank Ward – bass guitar, keyboards
- Charlie MacLean – vocals
- John Swanton – percussion & drums
- Linda Jannsen – vocals
- Grant Taylor – guitar
- Dave Wray – saxophone
- Richard Barry – vocals
- Terepai Richmond – drums
- Theo Silvera – drums
- Lisa Maxwell - recording vocalist
- Stephen O'Connell; - saxophone

== Discography ==
=== Albums ===
Title	Album details
One Blood	Released: October 1993; Label: Regular Records/Festival Records (D31043)
Babylon Mixed Business	Released: 1995; Label: Roadshow Music (17536-2)

== Awards and nominations ==
=== ARIA Music Awards ===
The ARIA Music Awards are a set of annual ceremonies presented by Australian Recording Industry Association (ARIA), which recognise excellence, innovation, and achievement across all genres of the music of Australia. They commenced in 1987.

Year	Nominee / work	Award	Result	Ref.
1994	One Blood	Best Pop Release	Nominated	
