= Michael Tuahine =

Australian singer, actor and presenter

- Born: New Zealand
- Occupations: Singer, Actor, Presenter

Michael Tuahine is an Australian singer, actor and presenter.

Tuahine was a singer in the band Aim 4 More. After they broke up he toured nationally with Corrugation Road in 1998, playing Dr Basketcase. Following this he was part of the ensemble in the musical Show Boat at Melbourne's Regent Theatre from 1998 to 1999.

Tuahine graduated from National Institute of Dramatic Art in 2002, performing in their third year play Country Music at the Parade Theatre.

From 2003 to 2004 he played multiple supporting roles touring in Last Cab to Darwin. and in 2005 at the Octagon Theatre was in Ruby's Last Dollar as Ruby's first partner, Lionel. In 2005 he starred in Sa Black Thing, the second film of SBS's Dramatically Black series and later featured in 2008's Valentine's Day. He played the Huntsmen in La Boite's 2016 staging of Snow White at the Roundhouse Theatre. 2023 saw him in Don't Ask What the Bird Look Like at the Bille Brown Theatre. and playing the Wizard in The Wizard of Oz at the QPAC.

Tuahine conceived and starred as Jimmy Little in the 2015 touring musical Country Song.

He hosted the Deadly Awards in 2001 and 2003 and presented from their red carpet in 2008. He hosted SBS TV's HotSpell in 2007.

Tuahine was born in New Zealand to a Ngāti Kahungunu father and a Gungalu mother. His family moved to Australia when he was four.
