= Wild Water (Australian band) =

- Origin: Northern Territory, Australia
- Members: Djolpa McKenzie; Airi Ingram; Geoff Barrett; Noeletta Young; Phillip Eaton

Wild Water is a band which plays a mix of reggae, rock, dub and funk. They sing in Brarra, Kriol and English. They call their music "saltwater style". Wild Water has toured nationally and released two albums, Baltpa and Rrawa. Members of the band come from around Australia (Arnhem Land, Central Australia, Darwin, south-west Western Australia) and internationally (Papua New Guinea and Fiji).

Wild Water won a 1996 Deadly Award for Best New Talent of the Year.

== Discography ==
- Rrawa (2007)
- Baltpa EP (1996)
