= Jimmy Little =

Australian Aboriginal musician (1937–2012)

Jimmy Little AO
- Little performing at Corroboree 2000

Background information
- Also known as: The Balladeer; The Honey Voice; Uncle Jimmy; Gentleman Jim
- Born: James Oswald Little; 1 March 1937; Cummeragunja Aboriginal Reserve, New South Wales, Australia
- Died: 2 April 2012 (aged 75) Dubbo, New South Wales, Australia
- Genres: Acoustic, folk rock, country
- Occupations: Musician, actor, teacher
- Instruments: Vocals, guitar, harmonica
- Years active: 1951–2012
- Labels: Regal Zonophone, Festival, Warner
- Formerly of: The Jimmy Little Trio
- Website: jimmylittle.com.au Jimmy Little Foundation

James Oswald Little, AO (1 March 1937 – 2 April 2012) was an Australian Aboriginal musician, actor and teacher, who was a member of the Yorta Yorta tribe and was raised on the Cummeragunja Reserve, New South Wales.

Little started his professional career in 1951, as a singer-songwriter and guitarist, which spanned six decades. For many years he was the main Aboriginal star on the Australian music scene. His music was influenced by Nat King Cole, Johnny Mathis and American country music artist Jim Reeves. His gospel song "Royal Telephone" (1963) sold over 75,000 copies, and his most popular album, Messenger, peaked at No. 26 in 1999 on the ARIA Albums Chart.

At the ARIA Music Awards of 1999, Little was inducted into the ARIA Hall of Fame and won an ARIA Award for Best Adult Contemporary Album. On Australia Day (26 January) 2004, he was made an Officer of the Order of Australia with the citation, "For service to the entertainment industry as a singer, recording artist and songwriter and to the community through reconciliation and as an ambassador for Indigenous culture".

As an actor, he appeared in the films Shadow of the Boomerang (1960) and Until the End of the World (1991), in the theatre production Black Cockatoos and in the opera Black River. As a teacher, from 1985, he worked at the Eora Centre in Redfern and from 2000 was a guest lecturer at the University of Sydney's Koori Centre.

Little was a diabetic with a heart condition and, in 2004, had a kidney transplant. After his transplant he established the Jimmy Little Foundation to promote indigenous health and diet. On 2 April 2012, Little died at his home in Dubbo, aged 75 years.

== Career ==
James Oswald Little was born on 1 March 1937, a member of the Yorta Yorta people with his mother, Frances, a Yorta Yorta woman and his father, James Little Sr, from the Yuin people. Little's totem is the long-necked turtle. Jimmy Little Sr. was a tap dancer, comedian, musician and singer who led his own vaudeville troupe along the Murray River during the 1930s and 1940s. His mother was a singer and yodeller who had joined Jimmy Sr.'s troupe.

Little grew up, the eldest of seven children, on the Cummeragunja Aboriginal Reserve on the Murray River in New South Wales, about 30 kilometres (19 mi) from Echuca in Victoria. Little later recalled his upbringing, "[my parents] taught me well about the value of life, freedom, love, respect, all those basic things that we need. As Vaudevillians, I loved them. It was part of my dream to follow in the footsteps of Mum and Dad. And I'm so proud that I was able to do that". He became a devout non-denominational Christian. He is an uncle of writer, soprano, and composer Deborah Cheetham and older brother of the late Aboriginal author and singer-songwriter Betty Little. In February 1939, about 200 to 300 members of the mission participated in the Cummeragunja walk-off – in protest at the low standard of living conditions. The Little family moved to his father's tribal land (near Wallaga Lake) and lived for some years on the New South Wales south coast at Nowra and Moruya.

Not long after moving, Frances died from a tetanus infection after cutting her finger on an oyster shell. At the age of 13, Little was given a guitar and within a year he was playing at local concerts. When 16 years old he travelled to Sydney to perform on a radio programme, Australia's Amateur Hour. In 1955 Little left home to live in Sydney and pursue a career in country music, his mellow style earned him the nicknames of "the Balladeer", "Gentleman Jim" and "the Honey Voice".

=== Early years: 1956–1979 ===
Little signed with Regal Zonophone Records in 1956 and released his first single, "Mysteries of Life"/"Heartbreak Waltz". In 1958, Little married fellow singer, Marjorie Rose Peters. By late 1959, Little was living in Granville with his wife and their daughter Frances Claire – he released the single, "Frances Claire", when she was 18 months-old. It was issued on EMI's Columbia label and was soon followed by "Give the Coloured Boy a Chance", which had been written by his father – the first song released in Australia referring to indigenous issues and first both written and recorded by indigenous musicians. He worked at a towelling factory and supplemented his income with performances at concerts and dances, and TV appearances on Bandstand. Little signed with Festival Records and in September 1959, he had his first charting single, "Danny Boy", from the extended play, Jimmy Little Sings Ballads with a Beat, which peaked at No. 9 in Sydney.

In February 1960, his next single was "El Paso", which reached No. 12 in Sydney. Little made his acting debut in the Billy Graham evangelical feature film Shadow of the Boomerang the same year. Little had the role of Johnny, a devout stockman on a cattle station where his American employer's son Bob refers to him as "that nigger". After Johnny dies, while saving Bob's life, from being gored by a wild boar, Bob has a religious conversion to Graham's cause. Little issued the title song as a single backed by "Little by Little". In September 1961, he appeared on the radio program, Col Joye Show, with fellow Bandstand regulars, Patsy Ann Noble and Judy Stone. By 1962, Little joined a touring stage production, All Coloured Show produced by Ted Quigg, and gained wider public exposure. In July 1963, he toured north west New South Wales with Rob E.G., Noleen Batley and Lonnie Lee and was personally booked out till November.

In October 1963, after 17 singles, Little issued his biggest hit with the gospel song, "Royal Telephone", based upon the Burl Ives' version. In November it peaked at No. 1 in Sydney and No. 3 in Melbourne. The following month Australian Women's Weekly's music writer, Bob Rogers described it as "a sincere ballad with a religious feeling" and that "[i]n only three weeks the record was rising to the top all over Australia, one of the fastest-selling records of the year". It was awarded 3× Gold certification by Festival Records and "Best Male Vocal Disk" (1963) in "The Tunetable Awards", Australia's first disk awards from a major radio source for home-produced disks. In March 1964 the Barry Gibb-penned "One Road" reached No. 19 in Sydney and No. 30 in Melbourne. Gibb was 17 years old when he wrote "One Road" and Little became one of the first artists to record a Gibb song. The magazine Everybody's named him Australian Pop Star of the Year. Little was backed by the Jimmy Little Trio which had an all-indigenous line-up of Cyril Green, Doug Peters and Neville Thorn.

Little's final hit of the era came in September 1974 with "Baby Blue" which peaked at No. 8 in Melbourne and No. 37 in Sydney. Further non-charting singles were released until 1978's "Beautiful Woman". From the end of the 1970s, Little turned from his musical career to focus on his family and becoming qualified as a teacher.

=== Middle years: 1980–1999 ===
Little had turned to full-time acting by the 1980s, making his theatre debut in Black Cockatoos before appearing in director Wim Wenders' 1991 film Until the end of the World. As well as appearing in Tracey Moffatt's Night Cries and Andrew Schultz's opera Black River, his teaching and community work earned him the title of NAIDOC Aboriginal of the Year in 1989. After winning that award Little returned to working in the music industry.

In 1992, Little performed at the Tamworth on Parade and Kings of Country roadshows before releasing his 14th album, Yorta Yorta Man, in 1994. The same year, he was inducted into Australian Roll of Renown, the highest honour an Australian country music artist can achieve.

Messenger, a collection of contemporary songs reinterpreted through Little's smooth vocals, was released in June 1999 and peaked at No. 26 nationally, selling over 20,000 copies. It had been organised by Brendan Gallagher (from Karma County) and featured covers of well-known songs by Australian artists: "(Are You) The One I've Been Waiting For?" by Nick Cave, "The Way I Made You Feel" by Ed Kuepper and "Randwick Bells" by Paul Kelly.

At the ARIA Music Awards of 1999 Messenger won the ARIA Award for Best Adult Contemporary Album and Little was inducted into the ARIA Hall of Fame. At The Deadly Awards of 1999 – the annual Aboriginal and Torres Strait Islander Music Awards – he won Best Male Artist of the Year and Best Single Release of the Year. By 2001 Messenger was certified by ARIA with a gold record for shipments of 35,000 units.

=== Later years: 2000–2012 ===
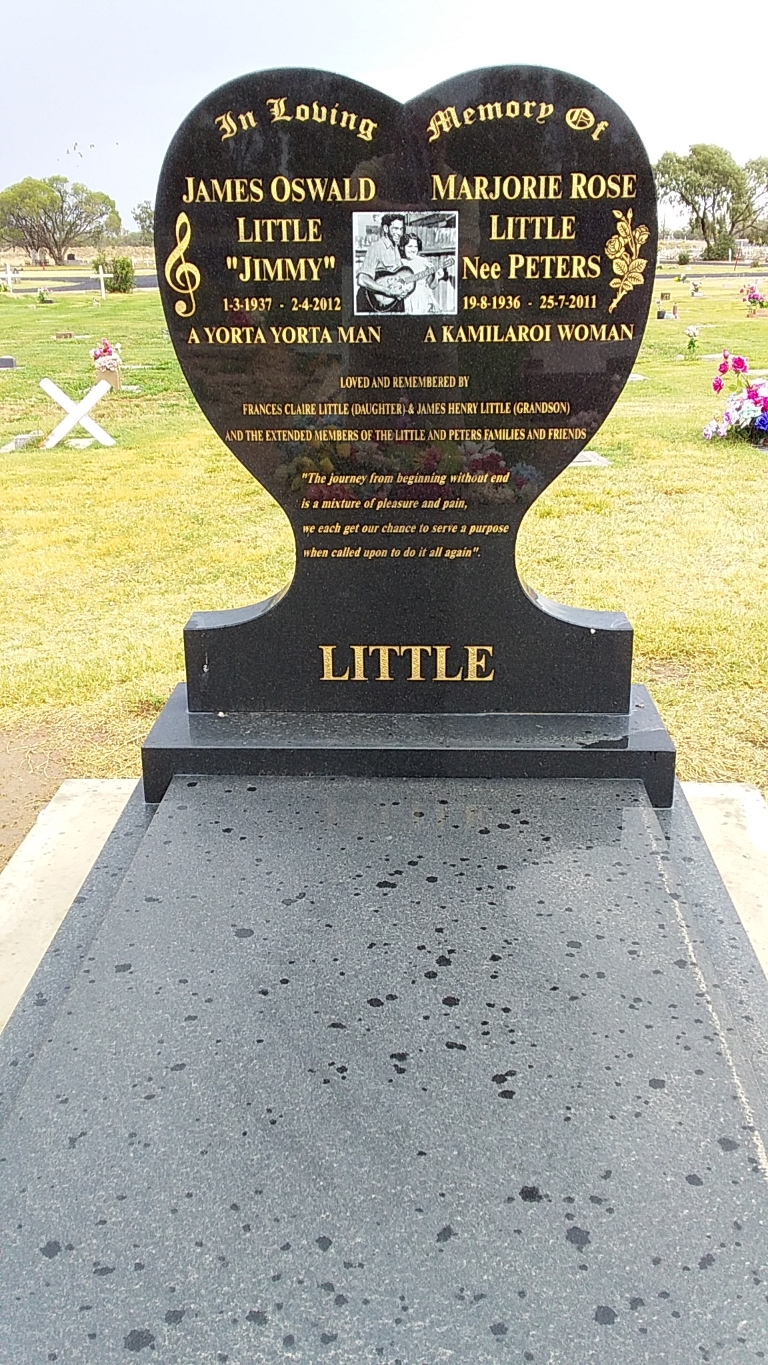

Little returned in September 2001 with Resonate, an album featuring songs written by Paul Kelly, Don Walker, Bernard Fanning (from Powderfinger), Brendan Gallagher and Dave Graney. In 2002 Little won the Golden Gospel Award at the Australian Gospel Music Awards for his lifetime support of Australian gospel music. He also sang "Happy Day" with Olivia Newton-John that year. In 2000 he was a guest of The Wiggles on their children's DVD It’s A Wiggly Wiggly World.

Little released the album Down the Road for ABC Country in 2003. In 2004 he released his 34th album, Life's What You Make It, a collection of distinctive and poignant versions of songs by contemporary artists as diverse as the Red Hot Chili Peppers, U2, PJ Harvey, Neil Young, Brian Wilson, Elvis Costello and Bruce Springsteen.

In 2010 Little retired from performing. On 2 April 2012 Little died of natural causes in Dubbo, aged 75 years. He is buried in Walgett, NSW. The town has a tall water tank with a picture of him painted on it.

== Legacy ==
At The Deadly Awards, from 2005, the Lifetime Achievement Award for Contribution to Aboriginal and Torres Strait Islander Music, was named the Jimmy Little Lifetime Achievement Award for Contribution to Aboriginal and Torres Strait Islander Music.

Actor and musician Michael Tuahine proposed a play based on the life of Jimmy Little. The play was written by Reg Cribb and called Country Song; it won the 2013 Rodney Seaborn Playwrights Award for New Work. It was performed by the Queensland Theatre Company in the Cremorne Theatre at the Queensland Performing Arts Centre in August 2015.

On 27 May 2022, he was honoured with a Google Doodle.

A biography, Jimmy Little: A Yorta Yorta Man, written by his daughter Frances Peters-Little, was published in March 2023 by Hardie Grant.

== Personal life ==
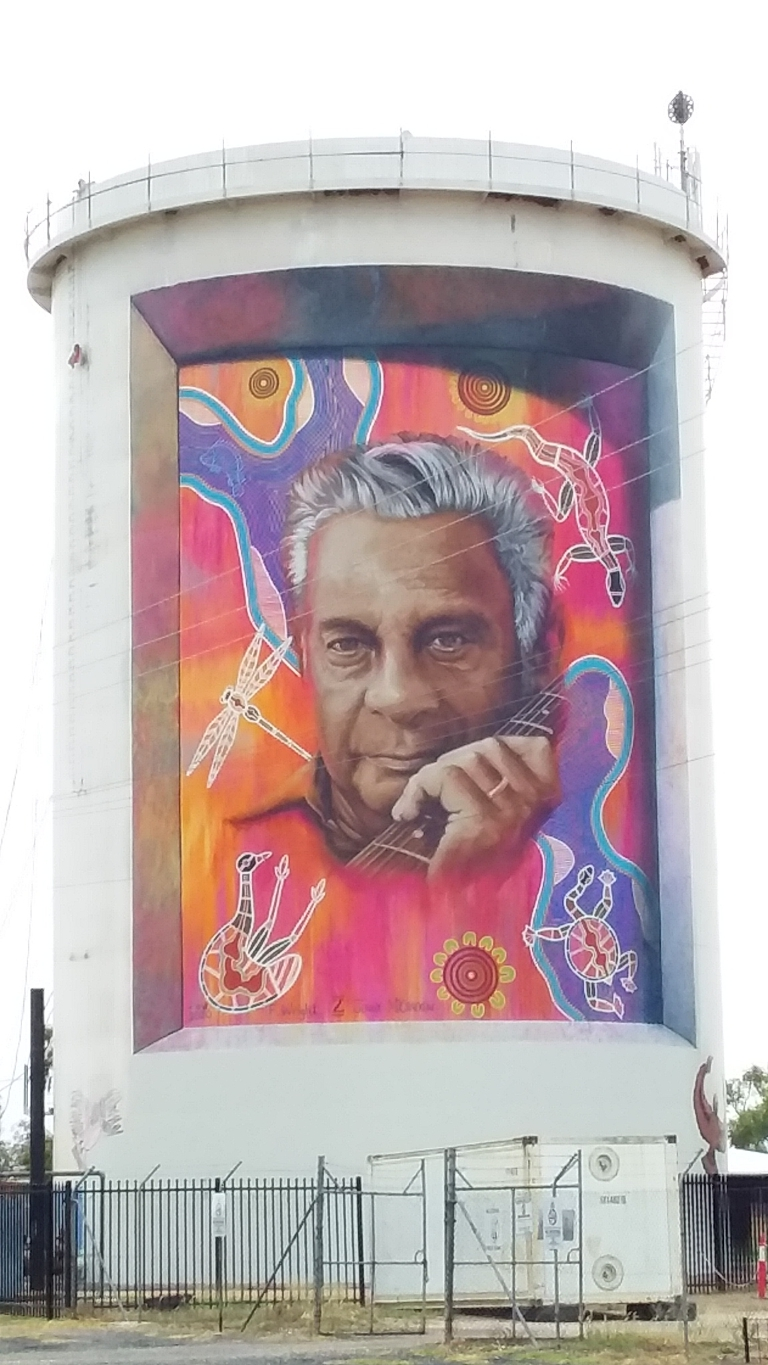
Jimmy Little image on Water Tank in Walgett, New South Wales

Little married fellow singer, Marjorie Rose Peters in 1958 and they had one child, Frances Claire Peters-Little (born ca. March 1958), who is a documentary film-maker, writer and historian. In 1990, Little was diagnosed with kidney disease, "Unfortunately, I didn't get check-ups often enough or soon enough to realise the possibility that my kidneys could fail".

From 1985, Little taught and mentored indigenous music students at the Eora Centre in Redfern, and from 2002 he was an ambassador for literacy and numeracy for the Department of Education. Since 2000, Little was a guest lecturer at the University of Sydney's Koori Centre.

In 2002, he was diagnosed with kidney failure and was placed on dialysis and, in 2004, had a kidney transplant. As a result of immunosuppressants Little developed type 2 diabetes. He also developed a heart condition. In 2006, Little launched the Jimmy Little Foundation to help the many other indigenous Australians who are succumbing to kidney disease. The foundation works with patients in regional and remote Australia and partnered with The Fred Hollows Foundation in 2009 to develop a nutrition and education program for indigenous children to reduce the cycle of bad nutrition leading to diabetes which can lead to kidney failure and diabetic retinopathy.

His wife Marjorie Rose Little died on 25 July 2011, aged 74, in Dubbo – she had been under medical care since early that year for an unspecified illness.

On 2 April 2012, Little died at his home in Dubbo, aged 75. He is survived by his daughter, Frances, and his grandson, James Henry Little. In 2005, Little told Peter Thompson, on the ABC TV program Talking Heads, how he would like to be remembered, "I just want people to remember me as a nice person who was fair-minded and had a bit of talent that put it to good use."

== Awards and nominations ==
On Australia Day (26 January) 2004, Little was made an Officer of the Order of Australia with the citation, "For service to the entertainment industry as a singer, recording artist and songwriter and to the community through reconciliation and as an ambassador for Indigenous culture". Also that year he was named a Living National Treasure.

In June 2005, on the last day of National Reconciliation Week, Little and composer Peter Sculthorpe were awarded honorary doctorates in music by the University of Sydney in recognition of "their joint contribution to reconciliation between indigenous and non-indigenous Australians". Other honorary doctorates have been awarded to Little by Queensland University of Technology and Australian Catholic University.

=== APRA Awards ===
The APRA Awards are held in Australia and New Zealand by the Australasian Performing Right Association to recognise songwriting skills, sales and airplay performance by its members annually.

Year	Nominee / work	Award	Result
2010	Jimmy Little	Ted Albert Award for Outstanding Services to Australian Music	awarded

=== Australia Council for the Arts ===
The Australia Council for the Arts is the arts funding and advisory body for the Government of Australia. Since 1993, it has awarded a Red Ochre Award. It is presented to an outstanding Indigenous Australian (Aboriginal Australian or Torres Strait Islander) artist for lifetime achievement.

Year	Nominee / work	Award	Result
2003	himself	Red Ochre Award	Awarded

=== Australian Roll of Renown ===
The Australian Roll of Renown honours Australian and New Zealander musicians who have shaped the music industry by making a significant and lasting contribution to Country Music. It was inaugurated in 1976 and the inductee is announced at the Country Music Awards of Australia in Tamworth in January.

Year	Nominee / work	Award	Result
1994	Jimmy Little	Australian Roll of Renown	inductee

=== ARIA Music Awards ===
The ARIA Music Awards is an annual awards ceremony that recognises excellence, innovation, and achievement across all genres of Australian music. They commenced in 1987.

Year	Nominee / work	Award	Result
1999	Jimmy Little	ARIA Hall of Fame	inductee
1999	Messenger	Best Adult Contemporary Album	Won
2002	Resonate	Best Adult Contemporary Album	Nominated
2004	Life's What You Make It	Best Adult Contemporary Album	Nominated

=== Country Music Awards (CMAA) ===
The Country Music Awards of Australia (CMAA) (also known as the Golden Guitar Awards) is an annual awards night held in January during the Tamworth Country Music Festival, celebrating recording excellence in the Australian country music industry. They have been held annually since 1973.

Year	Nominee / work	Award	Result (wins only)
1994	Jimmy Little	Australian Roll of Renown	awarded

=== Deadly Awards ===
The Deadly Awards, (commonly known simply as The Deadlys), was an annual celebration of Australian Aboriginal and Torres Strait Islander achievement in music, sport, entertainment and community. They ran from 1996 to 2013.

Year	Nominee / work	Award	Result (wins only)
1997	"himself"	Outstanding Contribution to Aboriginal Music	awarded
1999	"himself"	Male Artist of the Year	Won
1999	"The Way You Make Me Feel"	Single Release of the Year	Won
2002	"himself"	Country Artist of the Year	Won
2007	"himself"	Jimmy Little Lifetime Achievement Award for Contribution to Aboriginal and Torres Strait Islander Music	awarded

=== Helpmann Awards ===
The Helpmann Awards is an awards show, celebrating live entertainment and performing arts in Australia, presented by industry group Live Performance Australia (LPA) since 2001. In 2012, Little received the JC Williamson Award, the LPA's highest honour, for their life's work in live performance.

Year	Nominee / work	Award	Result
2012	Himself	JC Williamson Award	awarded

=== Mo Awards ===
The Australian Entertainment Mo Awards (commonly known informally as the Mo Awards), were an annual Australian entertainment industry awards. They recognised achievements in live entertainment in Australia from 1975 to 2016. Little won two awards in that time.

Year	Nominee / work	Award	Result (wins only)
1996	Jimmy Little	John Campbell Fellowship Award	Won
2003	Jimmy Little	Classic Rock Performer of the Year	Won

== Discography ==
=== Albums ===
- You'll Never Walk Alone (Festival Records, 1960)
- A Tree in The Meadow (Festival, February 1962)
- By Request (Festival, 1963)
- Sing to Glory (Festival, 1963)
- Royal Telephone (Festival, 1964)
- Encores (Festival, 1964)
- Onward Christian Soldiers (Festival, 1964)
- Jimmy Little Sings Country & Western Greats (Festival, 1965)
- 10th Anniversary (Festival, 1966)
- Ballads and Strings (Festival, 1967)
- New Songs from Jimmy Little (Festival, 1967)
- The Best of Jimmy Little (Festival, 1968)
- I Can't Stop Loving You (Festival, 1969)
- Song to Glory (1969)
- The Country Sound of Jimmy Little (1969)
- Goodbye Old Rolf (1970)
- Winterwood (Festival, 1972)
- Waltzing Matilda (Festival, 1972)
- Jimmy by Request (1973)
- Country Boy, Country Hits (Festival, 1974)
- All For Love (Festival, 1975)
- Country Sounds (February 1975)
- I Can't Stop Loving You (February 1975)
- Jimmy Little Sings Country (1975)
- Travellin' Minstrel Man (Festival, 1976)
- The Best of Jimmy Little (Festival, 1977)
- An Evening with Jimmy Little (1978) (2× live album recorded at the Sydney Opera House)
- 20 Golden Country Greats (Festival, 1979)
- The Best of Jimmy Little (June 1994)
- Yorta Yorta Man (Monitor, 1995)
- Messenger (June 1999) - Australia #26 and was certified gold.
- Resonate (October 2001)
- Passage 1959–2001: Jimmy Little Anthology (October 2002) / Jimmy Little: The Definitive Collection (2004) (2×CD)
- Down the Road (September 2003)
- Life's What You Make It (May 2004)
- Songman (December 2012) (3×CD)

=== EPs ===
- The Grandest Show of All (1957)
- Jimmy Little Sings Ballads with a Beat (FX-5126 Festival Records, 1959)
- A Fool Such As I (1960)
- Whispering Hope (1960)
- Too Many Parties & Too Many Pals (1961)
- A Man Called Peter (1962)
- The Way of the Cross (1962)
- Jimmy Little's Big Four (1962)
- The Grandest Show of All (1963)
- Royal Telephone (1963)
- Old Time Religion (1964)
- One Road (1964)
- A Christmas Selection (1965)
- Eternally (1965)
- Lifeline (1965)
- Ring, Bells Ring (1965)
- A Christmas Selection (1966)
- Goodbye Old Rolf (1970)

=== Singles ===
Year	Single	Chart Positions
Year	Single	AUS
1956	"Mysteries of Life"	-
1956	"It's Time To Pay"	-
1956	"Someday You're Gonna Call My Name"	-
1956	"Sweet Mama"	-
1957	"Silver City Comet"	-
1959	"Frances Claire"	-
1959	"Give The Coloured Boy a Chance"	-
1959	"Danny Boy"	18
1960	"El Paso"	21
1960	"The Shadow of the Boomerang"	-
1960	"Bells of St. Marys"	-
1960	"Somebody's Pushing Me"	97
1961	"Kissing Someone Else"	-
1961	"Silent Night"	-
1962	"Little Green Valley"	-
1963	"Pledge of Love"	-
1963	"Royal Telephone"	10
1964	"Eternally"	99
1964	"Lifeline"	-
1964	"One Road"	31
1965	"His Faith in Me"	-
1965	"Bimbombey"	-
1965	"Ring, Bells Ring"	-
1966	"I Want To Be Free"	-
1966	"Too Many Times"	-
1968	"Molly"	-
1969	"I Can't Stop Loving You"	-
1970	"Goodbye Old Rolf"	-
1973	"There's a Heartache Following Me"	-
1974	"Baby Blue"	24
1975	"Ain't It Good (To Feel This Way)"	-
1975	"Goodbye Is Really Good at All"	-
1976	"Where The Blues of The Night Meets The Gold of The Day"	-
1978	"Beautiful Woman"	-
1999	"Randwick Bells"	-
1999	"The Way I Made You Feel"	-
2001	"Bury Me Deep in Love"(with Kylie Minogue)	-
2002	"In a Field in France"	-
2009	"Royal Telephone" (Re-Recording)	-

== Other resources ==
- Jimmy Little: Performing Artist (1997), a 26-minute videocassette produced and directed by Robin Hughes and Linda Kruger for SBS-TV and Film Australia.
- Jimmy Little's Gentle Journey (2003), a 55-minute video written and directed by Sydney-based film-maker Sean Kennedy and released by Indigo Films and Warner Vision Australia.
- Jimmy Little (2005) a 26-minute DVD of a Talking Heads interview by Peter Thompson first broadcast on 29 April 2005.
- Frances Peters-Little. 2023. Jimmy Little: A Yorta Yorta Man. Hardie Grant Books. ISBN 9781743799062. Biography by his daughter.
