= Cannot Buy My Soul =

Compilation album tribute by Various artists
- Released: 17 February 2007
- Genres: Folk; country; bluegrass; pop
- Length: 142:41
- Labels: EMI; Virgin

Cannot Buy My Soul: The Songs of Kev Carmody, or more simply Cannot Buy My Soul, is a 2007 double-CD compilation tribute album featuring various artists performing tracks by Australian singer-songwriter Kev Carmody. They were brought together by rock musician, Paul Kelly, who also performs on a track. Artists include Dan Kelly (Paul's nephew), the John Butler Trio, the Waifs and Clare Bowditch.

The first disc is sub-titled, The Songs of Kev Carmody while the second disc, sub-titled, Originals, is a compilation of Carmody's original versions of the same tracks presented in the same order.

It entered the Australian Recording Industry Association (ARIA) albums chart at No. 31 and stayed in the top 50 for three weeks. It won Album of the Year at Deadly Awards 2007.

On 9 July 2020, EMI Music Australia announced a re-release of Cannot Buy My Soul with six new recordings, to be released on August 21. The 2020 edition will feature new recordings of Kev Carmody songs from Courtney Barnett, Kasey Chambers & Jimmy Barnes, Mo’Ju & Birdz (produced by Trials), Kate Miller-Heidke, Alice Skye and Electric Fields. This will be the first time the album will be available on vinyl.

== Release and reception ==
Paul Kelly met Kev Carmody in the 1980s. They co-wrote a track, "From Little Things Big Things Grow", which was first recorded in 1991 by Kelly and his group, Carmody and Kelly released a version as a single in 1993.

Kelly decided to bring together fellow Australian artists to record a tribute album of Carmody's songs, with the intention of bringing Carmody's music to a wider audience. The album, named after Carmody's song, "Cannot Buy My Soul", was released on 17 February 2007 on EMI Music Australia/Virgin Records.

Writing for The Courier-Mail, Noel Mengel praised the album and said that it was "more than just another tribute album [...] a powerful album in its own right as well as an introduction to a diverse body of work." He noted the diversity of styles of the cover versions and called Paul Kelly, Augie March and Missy Higgins' version of "Droving Woman", "stunning". Patrick Donovan from The Age said that it contained a well-chosen selection of tracks. He felt Clare Bowditch's version of "Blood Red Rose", was "stunning" and said that "This Land Is Mine", sung by Scott Wilson and Dan Sultan, was "evocative".

In October 2010 the tribute album was listed in the top 40 in the book, 100 Best Australian Albums.

== Track listing ==
=== 2007 release ===
All tracks are written by Kev Carmody unless otherwise shown.

The Songs of Kev Carmody
| No. | Title | Artist | Length |
|---|---|---|---|
| 1. | "I've Been Moved" | Dan Kelly | 3:39 |
| 2. | "Thou Shalt Not Steal" | John Butler Trio | 4:50 |
| 3. | "Elly" | Bernard Fanning | 4:47 |
| 4. | "The Young Dancer Is Dead" | The Last Kinection | 3:02 |
| 5. | "From Little Things Big Things Grow" (Paul Kelly, Carmody) | The Waifs | 5:13 |
| 6. | "River of Tears" | The Drones | 4:24 |
| 7. | "On the Wire" | Troy Cassar-Daley | 3:43 |
| 8. | "Cannot Buy My Soul" | Archie Roach | 2:47 |
| 9. | "Moonstruck" | Sara Storer | 3:15 |
| 10. | "This Land Is Mine" (Kelly, Carmody) | Scott Wilson, Dan Sultan | 4:06 |
| 11. | "Darkside" | Tex Perkins | 5:46 |
| 12. | "Blood Red Rose" | Clare Bowditch | 4:59 |
| 13. | "Comrade Jesus Christ" | The Herd | 4:14 |
| 14. | "Images of London" | Steve Kilbey | 5:15 |
| 15. | "Droving Woman" | Paul Kelly, Augie March, Missy Higgins | 8:44 |
| 16. | "Eulogy for a Black Man" | The Pigram Brothers | 4:42 |

Originals
| No. | Title | Length |
|---|---|---|
| 1. | "I've Been Moved" | 2:50 |
| 2. | "Thou Shalt Not Steal" | 4:54 |
| 3. | "Elly" | 4:53 |
| 4. | "The Young Dancer Is Dead" | 3:34 |
| 5. | "From Little Things Big Things Grow" | 5:49 |
| 6. | "River of Tears" | 2:32 |
| 7. | "On the Wire" | 4:39 |
| 8. | "Cannot Buy My Soul" | 2:34 |
| 9. | "Moonstruck" | 4:37 |
| 10. | "This Land Is Mine" | 2:56 |
| 11. | "Darkside" | 5:23 |
| 12. | "Blood Red Rose" | 3:22 |
| 13. | "Comrade Jesus Christ" | 2:13 |
| 14. | "Images of London" | 5:22 |
| 15. | "Droving Woman" | 9:17 |
| 16. | "Eulogy for a Black Man" | 4:12 |

=== 2020 Edition ===
CD3
| No. | Title | Artist | Length |
|---|---|---|---|
| 1. | "Black Bess" | Kasey Chambers & Jimmy Barnes | 3:49 |
| 2. | "Rider in the Rain 2020" | Mojo Juju, Trials & Birdz | 3:47 |
| 3. | "Blue You" | Alice Skye | 4:24 |
| 4. | "From Little Things Big Things Grow" | Electric Fields | 5:13 |
| 5. | "Blood Red Rose" | Kate Miller-Heidke | 4:27 |
| 6. | "Just for You" | Courtney Barnett | 4:06 |
| 7. | "Black Bess" | Kev Carmody | 3:59 |
| 8. | "Rider in the Rain" | Kev Carmody | 6:40 |
| 9. | "Blue You" | Kev Carmody with Andy White and Liam O'Maonlai | 6:04 |
| 10. | "From Little Things Big Things Grow" | Kev Carmody with Paul Kelly and Tiddas | 5:50 |
| 11. | "Blood Red Rose" | Kev Carmody | 3:21 |
| 12. | "Just for You" | Kev Carmody | 2:58 |

- Note: The 2020 digital edition lists the 22 cover versions first, with the 2020 tracks listed before the 2007 tracks. These are followed by the 20 Kev Carmody songs, again, with the 2020 tracks listed before the 2007 tracks.
- Note: The 2xLP edition features 19 cover versions only. It excludes the tracks "From Little Things Big Things Grow" by The Waifs, "Blood Red Rose" by Claire Bowdich and "Images of London" by Steve Kilbey.

== Charts ==
| Chart (2007) | Peak position |
|---|---|
| Australian Albums (ARIA) | 31 |

| Chart (2020) | Peak position |
|---|---|
| Australian Albums (ARIA) | 6 |

== Release history ==
| Region | Date | Format | Edition(s) | Label | Catalogue |
|---|---|---|---|---|---|
| Australia | February 2007 | 2xCD; digital download | Standard | Virgin Records / EMI Music | 377741 2 |
| Various | 21 August 2020 | 3xCD; 2xLP; digital download | 2020 Edition | EMI Music | 0737156 / 0717073 |
