= Vibe Australia =

Defunct media agency serving Indigneous Australians

- Type: Subsidiary
- Industry: Media, communications and events management agency
- Founded: 1993
- Defunct: 2014
- Key people: Gavin Jones; Georgia Cordukes
- Products: Radio, Television and Magazine

Vibe Australia was an Aboriginal media, communications, and events management agency founded by Gavin Jones in 1993. Located in Darlinghurst, Sydney, New South Wales, they worked with Aboriginal and Torres Strait Islander people throughout Australia. The organisation was known for hosting The Deadly Awards, as well as running the music and culture radio show Deadly Sounds. It also published the website and magazine Deadly Vibe, and hosted an annual national music and sporting event called The Vibe 3on3 for Indigenous Australians.

== History ==
Vibe Australia was founded in 1993 by Gavin Jones at the Boomalli Aboriginal Artists Cooperative. Rhoda Roberts was a producer at Vibe through its entire history.

In June 2014, Vibe Australia funding was cut by the Abbott government under Coalition budget measures designed to reallocate funding to Indigenous education programs, despite a recent audit which had been wholly positive. This including cutting the Deadly Awards funding back to $1 million, with no funding provided for future years. On 12 July 2014, Jones died at age 47.

On 14 July 2014, Vibe Australia announced that all Vibe projects including the Deadly Awards concluded on 30 June 2014. After a story was run on Triple J's Hack program on 15 July 2014, a groundswell of community support for saving the Deadly Awards began. A petition on Change.org attracted over 26,000 signatures and a Kickstarter campaign reached A$6,699.

The website, Deadly Vibe, was updated with the news of the project's termination, but kept as an archive of its activities up to that point.

== Productions ==
=== The Deadlys ===
Since 1995, the National Aboriginal and Torres Strait Islander Music, Sport, Entertainment and Community awards, known as the Deadly Awards or simply "The Deadlys", have been held at the Sydney Opera House and broadcast by SBS.

=== Other productions ===
Vibe Australia produced a number of other events and media broadcasts, including:

- Deadly Sounds, a weekly radio program syndicated to over 250 Aboriginal community stations
- Deadly Vibe, a national magazine and website focusing on health, sport, music and lifestyle.
- In Vibe, a magazine for Indigenous people in secure rehabilitation care and at risk, hosted by Rhoda Roberts.
- Move It Mob Style, a children's television show focusing on health, dance, and lifestyle, broadcast by NITV
- The Vibe 3on3, a national music and sporting event to promote health, well-being, Aboriginal identity, and sportsmanship

== Gavin Jones ==
Gavin Jones was born in 1966 in Goulburn, New South Wales and grew up there. He started a cadetship at the Goulburn Post, and then studied communications at the University of Canberra, graduating in 1989. He worked in journalism across various government departments.

In 2008, he launched Vibe TV, which produced the programs Living Strong and Move it Mob Style.

He died on his farm at Goulburn on 12 July 2014, aged 47.
