= Larry Maluma =

Zambian reggae artist based in Australia

Larry Maluma is a Zambian reggae artist based in Australia. He left Zambia in 1985. He sings in a combination of English and the Zambian languages Nyanja, Bemba and Tonga. Some of his songs have reached the top of the Zambian charts.

He has released 12 albums
