= Aim 4 More =

Australian musical group

AIM 4 More
- Origin: Brisbane, Queensland, Australia
- Years active: 1993-1997
- Past members: Troy Brady; Harry Whaleboat; Michael Tuahine; Rodney Stuurman; Wynyard Davis; Jonathan Bullen; Ross Johnson

Aim 4 More (AIM is for Aboriginal and Islander Mob) was an Indigenous Australian band. They released their debut self-titled CD in 1997. They won a Deadly in 1997 for Most Promising New Talent. They were features in the ABC TV show Defining Black.

== Discography ==
- AIM 4 More (1997) - Jamalga Music
