= Black Image =

Australian musical group

- Origin: Queensland, Australia
- Years active: 1997–present
- Members: Anselm Harrigan; Clifford Harrigan; Damien Harrigan; Dylan Harrigan; Vincent Harrigan
- Past members: Quinton Walker; Patrick Nandy

Black Image is an Australian band from Queensland. Hailing from their traditional countries of the Gugu Yimithirr and Kuku Yalangi areas, they are the traditional owners of the Dikarrba, Balganwarra, Dhuppiwarra and Dharrba Warra clans on the east coast of Cape York, Queensland. Band members have been brothers Vincent, Anselm, Dylan, Damien and Clifford Harrigan, their cousin Quinton Walker and Patrick Nandy. They won a Deadly in 2007 for Band of the Year and were finalist again in 2011. Black Image still performs at many private functions and festivals across Australia.

== Discography ==
- Durbbil Dikarrba (2002)
- Beautiful Land and Sea (2007)
- Too Deadly (2012)
