= Rochelle Watson =

Australian R&B and soul singer

- Born: Brisbane, Queensland
- Instrument: vocals

Rochelle Watson is an Australian R&B and soul singer. She won the 1999 Deadly Award for Most Promising New Talent.

== Discography ==
- Black To Reality ep - Junga/Vonu

== Charity ==
In July 2015, Rochelle became an official Ambassador for Kidney Health Australia.
