= Deadheart =

Australian rock/pop band

- Origin: Geelong, Victoria
- Label: CAAMA
- Past members: Ron Thorpe - Vocals, Bass, Percussion, Acoustic Guitar; Glenn Romanis - Didgeridoo, Percussion, Vocals; Chris Davies - Guitar; Ray Moore - Drums; Brian Hore - Congas, Bongos, Percussion; Kelly Itong - Guitar

Deadheart is an Australian rock/pop band from Geelong. The band released two albums in the 1990s and finished in 2000 when singer and songwriter Ron Thorpe was killed in a car accident. Thorpe had previously played with No Fixed Address and performed on the Terrasphere album and had been removed from his parents at the age of five.

== Discography ==
- Deadheart (1994) – CAAMA
- Sista Krista (1998) – CAAMA
