= Boomalli Aboriginal Artists Cooperative =

Artist cooperative in Sydney, Australia

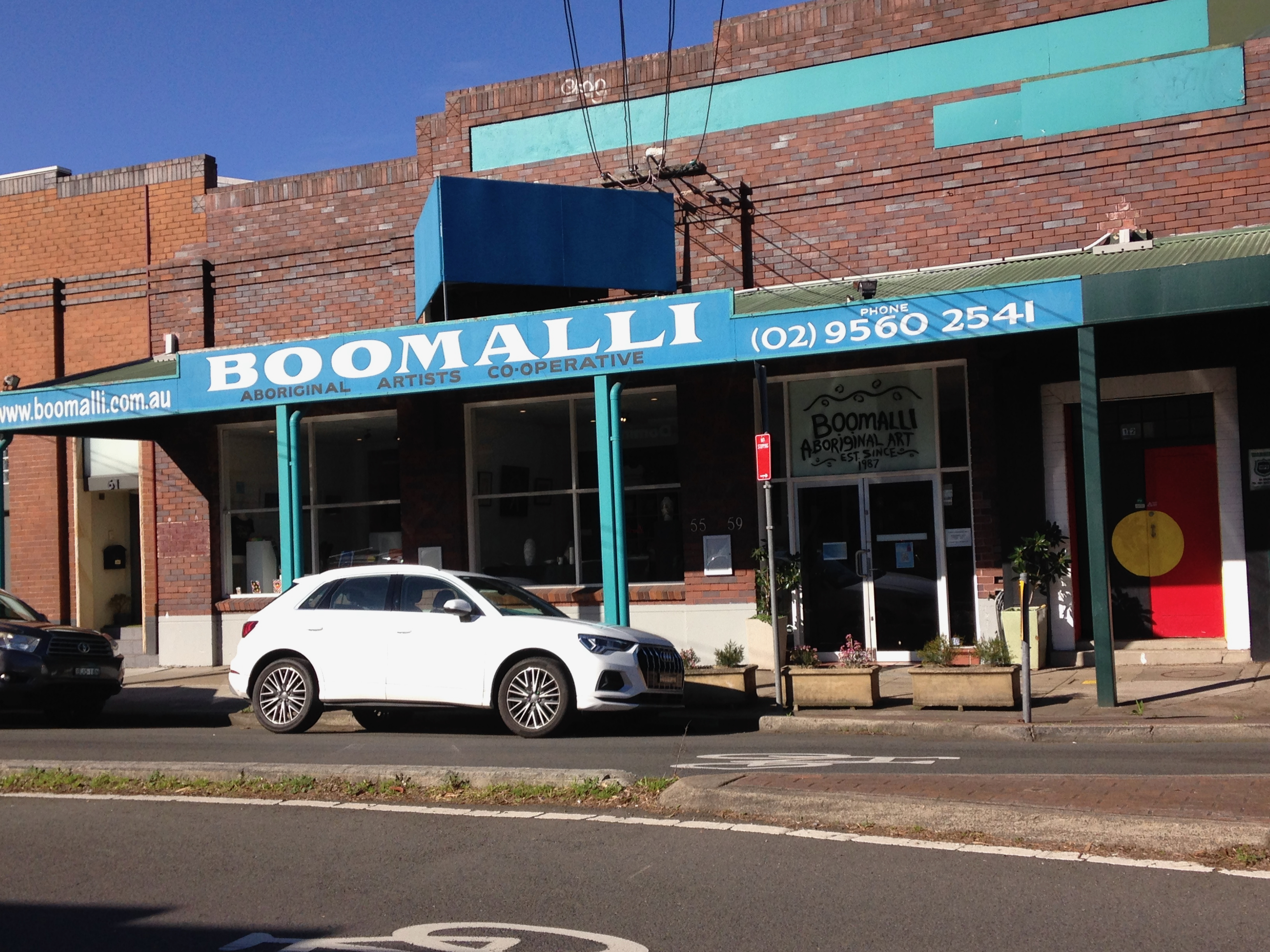
Boomalli Aboriginal Arts Co-Operative in August 2020

The Boomalli Aboriginal Artists Co-operative was founded in 1987 in the Sydney suburb of Redfern, New South Wales. Among the legacies of the Co-operative are the Deadly Awards for achievement in the Indigenous Australian community, which occurred annually from 1995 to 2013. The 20th anniversary of the Co-operative was celebrated in 2007 with an exhibition at the Art Gallery of NSW.

The founding members of the Co-operative are Michael Riley (1960–2004), Avril Quaill, Tracey Moffatt, Fiona Foley, Brenda L Croft, Jeffrey Samuels, Euphemia Bostock, Fern Martins, Bronwyn Bancroft and Arone Meeks.

== History ==
Boomalli has its roots in the National Black Theatre, which operated in Redfern in the 1970s and was part of "an explosion of pride and public confidence" in Aboriginal culture and organisations.

The urban Aboriginal art movement was given attention in 1984 with an exhibition in Woolloomooloo, a suburb of Sydney. This was followed by a 1986 exhibition. A number of critics gave negative comments and called urban Aboriginal art "a passing fad".

The ten artists who founded Boomalli were diverse in their art practices but together were seeking a way to be accepted in mainstream art. They have supported many Aboriginal and Torres Strait Islander artists through their gallery, which is now in the Sydney suburb of Leichhardt. Their primary objective is to support artists from Aboriginal language groups in the state of New South Wales.

The word boomalli means "make a mark" in at least three Aboriginal languages: Bandjalung, Kamilaroi/Gamilaraay and Wiradjuri.

The launch of the Co-operative in 1987 was made possible by photographer Michael Riley and activist Gary Foley, who was a director of the Aboriginal Arts Board and helped to get funding from the Board. But it was not smooth sailing. They were unable to achieve a permanent home and have had to move the Co-operative gallery four times. Government ministers did not respond to requests, and the Australian Taxation Office listed a major debt. With help from pro-bono lawyers the Co-operative was able to resolve their obligations and achieve legal rights to their current location.

By 2012 Boomalli was being run professionally with financial management, governance and marketing. While the Leichhardt council is supportive, the Co-operative has received no funding or support from state or Federal government.

== The Artists ==
The urban Aboriginal art movement presented strong political messages about the history and treatment of Aboriginal Australians, and their treatment in the 1980s.

In the 1990s the popularity of Aboriginal Art was booming nationally and overseas, as the Co-operative built relationships with major Australian and International galleries.

Today Boomalli includes and actively supports 50 Aboriginal artists, many of whom are young emerging artists. Many of these members have had enduring careers.

The Co-operative presents exhibitions each year, and small galleries at the front of their Leichhardt location allow individual artists to self-curate small exhibitions.

They also provide a shop of Aboriginal artists' work both in-gallery and online.
