= Reggae Dave =

Indigenous Australian musician (c1964–2015)

David John Elia Asera (~1964 – 20 December 2015) was a Northern Territory singer, who performed as Reggae Dave. He was inducted into the National Indigenous Music Awards (NIMAs) Hall of Fame in 2009.

Asera was a Torres Strait Islander and moved to the Northern Territory at age 19. He established himself in the local music scene and appeared in TV public safety campaigns. He performed live with his band The Iries (irie meaning feeling good). In 1990 along with Casso (Greg Castillon) he released Love is the Only Drug through CAAMA records. He died from cancer on 20 December 2015, aged 51. His debut solo album, Kaimel Urapun (We Are One), was released posthumously in 2016.

Casso and Reggae Dave

- Love is the Only Drug (1990) - CAAMA

Reggae Dave

- Kaimel Urapun (We are one) (2016)
