= BlueBeat Music =

Internet music service

BlueBeat, Inc.
- Type: Incorporated in Delaware, U.S.
- Founded: 2003; 23 years ago (as Music Public Broadcasting)
- Headquarters: Santa Cruz, California, United States
- Key people: Hank Risan, CEO; Bianca Soros, COO; Ted Fitzgerald, CTO
- Products: Internet music service
- Website: bluebeat.com

BlueBeat Music (BlueBeat; BlueBeat.com) is an internet music service that features unique sound-alike recordings of previously recorded musical works called “Psycho-Acoustic Simulations.”

== Background ==
BlueBeat Music, then called Music Public Broadcasting, launched in 2003. At the time, founder and CEO Hank Risan said that BlueBeat's song catalog would cover the “full gamut of musical tastes, from 15th Century Renaissance music and ragtime to today’s pop idols.” The BlueBeat website currently claims to offer more than 2.2 million tracks.

== Business goals ==
BlueBeat CEO Hank Risan started BlueBeat to restore degraded 20th century sound recordings, develop and patent a Serial Copy Management System (SCMS), protect digital content from piracy, and ensure that artists and composers receive due compensation for their works.

== Psycho-Acoustic Simulations ==
BlueBeat uses proprietary and patent-pending technology to create sound-alike recordings of previously recorded musical works, called “Psycho-Acoustic Simulations,” based on psychoacoustics, a branch of science that studies the psychological and physiological responses associated with sound (including speech and music). In a 2009 interview, Risan said the Psycho-Acoustic Simulations are "akin to songs performed by 'cover' bands."

To create Psycho-Acoustic Simulations, BlueBeat sound engineers (a) analyze and deconstruct original sound recordings into their component parts, (b) create compositional scores based on the deconstructions, (c) synthesize replacement sounds, and (d) fix the sounds in a virtual 3-D sound stage in MP3 format.

== BlueBeat licensing ==
To lawfully create, broadcast, and distribute the simulations, BlueBeat obtained composition licenses from Harry Fox Agency, American Society of Composers, Authors and Publishers (ASCAP), Broadcast Music, Inc. (BMI), and SESAC. BlueBeat also has Section 112 and Section 114 commercial webcasting licenses and pays artist royalties through SoundExchange. To protect the simulations, BlueBeat Music licensed the Media Rights Technologies’ SCMS Patent Portfolio to monetize and secure its content.

=== Beatles controversy ===
In November 2009 BlueBeat sparked a copyright controversy when it offered simulated songs for $0.25 per download, including, for the first time, Beatles songs.

London-based EMI Group Ltd. filed suit, accusing BlueBeat of violating copyright law by offering the Beatles’ entire catalog without EMI's permission. A spokesperson for EMI said the company had "not authorized content to be sold or made available on Bluebeat.com." In court filings, BlueBeat asserted that it legally licensed the Beatles simulations and was paying royalties due. BlueBeat further claimed that it lawfully simulated the Beatles songs under the sound-alike provision of Section 114 (b) of the Copyright Act."

After listening to the BlueBeat simulations, Federal Judge John F. Walter issued a temporary restraining order against BlueBeat.com to stop selling the Beatles song simulations online, opining that differences in the sound recordings were not discernible. BlueBeat agreed to stop selling the Beatles simulations until the U.S. Copyright Office issues a registration for the simulations, and settled the EMI lawsuit with no admission of liability for $950,000.

== See also ==
- Hank Risan
- Harmonic analysis
