= Hank Risan =

American businessman and scientist

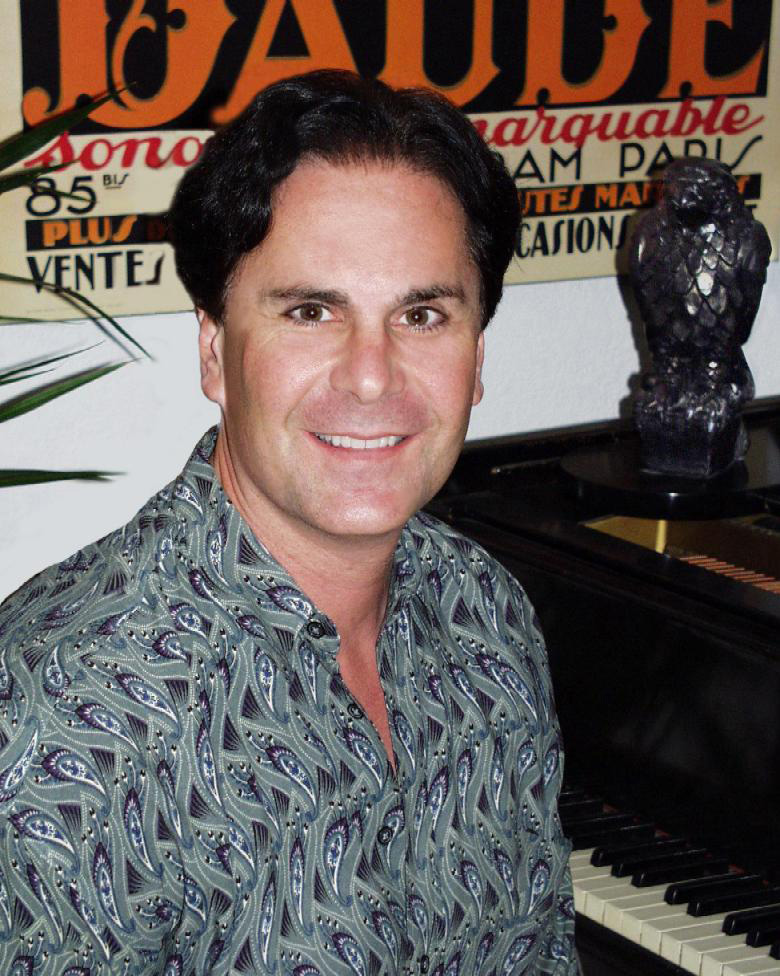
- Born: February 13, 1955 (age 71); Burbank, California, U.S.
- Education: UCLA (1970s); Cal Berkeley (1970s; Phi Beta Kappa); London School of Economics
- Alma mater: UC Santa Cruz – B.S. Math and Biology (1970s)
- Organizations: Media Rights Technologies, Inc. (CEO); BlueBeat Music (CEO); TheMoMI.org (Chairman)
- Known for: Digital rights management; Low-dimensional topology; Psychoacoustics
- Awards: NSF Award in Mathematics (c. 1976)

Hank Risan (born February 13, 1955) is an American business executive, scientist, and creator of digital media rights and security patents. Risan was arrested on August 5th, 2025, and charged with four counts of wire fraud, per the U.S. Attorney's Office, Northern District of California.

== Early life and education ==
Risan was born in Burbank, California in 1955. He began studying the piano at age 5 and the guitar at age 13. At age 15, Risan became an apprentice to fretted instrument maker Jonathan Carmi Simon at the Dulcimer Works in Los Angeles and at age 17 started buying and selling vintage guitars made by C. F. Martin & Company.

Risan worked with noted neurobiologist Dr. Charles Leo Ortiz, head of the Dept. of Biology at University of California, Santa Cruz (UCSC). Risan also did 3-D simulated computer modeling of the tertiary topology of the hemoglobin molecule with a grant from the National Institutes of Health. For Dr. Gerhard Ringel, head of the Math department at UCSC, Risan worked on embeddings on orientable and non-orientable surfaces. He also worked on a non-computer-based solution for the four color theorem.

During the 1970s, Risan studied mathematics for two years at the University of California, Los Angeles (UCLA) and earned bachelor's degrees in mathematics (with Honors) and biology from UCSC. His undergraduate thesis in neurobiology concerned the network topology of the human brain. Risan concurrently attended Ph.D. programs at UCSC and the University of California, Berkeley (where he was Phi Beta Kappa) in mathematics and neurobiology. He also studied topological manifold theory with Robion Kirby, co-inventor the Kirby–Siebenmann class, at UC Berkeley. Risan completed his Ph.D. dissertation at University of Cambridge, England and he attended graduate-level business courses at the London School of Economics.

== Career ==
Risan was a securities trader during his career. Currently, he is CEO of Media Rights Technologies, Inc. and its subsidiary, BlueBeat Music, and chairman of TheMoMI.org, an online repository of articles about musical instruments.

=== Media Rights Technologies, Inc. ===
In 2001 Risan and his business partner, Bianca Soros, founded Media Rights Technologies, Inc. (MRT) (originally called "Music Public Broadcasting") to develop intellectual property and technologies that would enable secure transmission, protection and monetization of digital content within a computer network.

In 1999 Risan funded a team of 16 software engineers to develop technology that would protect record companies, Hollywood studios, and other digital content owners against piracy and ensure accurate monetization of their content. In 2001 Risan began filing domestic and foreign digital media and security patent applications, more than 20 of which have been allowed to date.

==== Beatles controversy ====
In November 2009 Risan sparked a copyright controversy when BlueBeat offered its full catalog of simulated songs for $0.25 per download, including, for the first time, Beatles songs.

London-based EMI Group Ltd. filed suit, accusing BlueBeat of violating copyright law by offering the Beatles’ entire catalog without EMI’s permission. A spokesperson for EMI said the company had "not authorized content to be sold or made available on Bluebeat.com." In court filings, BlueBeat asserted that it legally licensed the Beatles simulations and was paying royalties due. BlueBeat further claimed that it lawfully simulated the Beatles songs under the sound-alike provision of Section 114 (b) of the Copyright Act."

After listening to the BlueBeat simulations, Federal Judge John F. Walter issued a temporary restraining order against BlueBeat.com to stop selling the Beatles song simulations online, opining that differences in the sound recordings were not discernible. BlueBeat agreed to stop selling the Beatles simulations until the U.S. Copyright Office issues a registration for the simulations, and settled the EMI lawsuit with no admission of liability for $950,000.

== Personal life ==
=== Collections ===
Hank Risan musical instrument collection included more than 750 examples of fine 19th and 20th century acoustic instruments. Risan owns an 1835 Martin 2½-17 guitar that is believed to have accompanied Mark Twain (born Samuel Clemens) throughout his life. During a 1999 appearance on National Public Radio's (NPR) "All Things Considered" program Risan played an arrangement of the Stephen Foster classic, "Old Susannah," on the Twain guitar.

In 2014, Risan placed 265 of his classic guitars on the block with boutique auction house Guernsey's in New York. The auction was called "The Artistry of the Guitar". However, many of the guitars, including the Martin--which was ultimately purchased by The Martin Guitar Company--did not reach their pre-auction estimates or reserves.

Risan also owns an authenticated Maltese Falcon prop from the 1941 Warner Bros. film production directed by John Huston and starring Humphrey Bogart.
