= Frank Yamma =

Australian musician

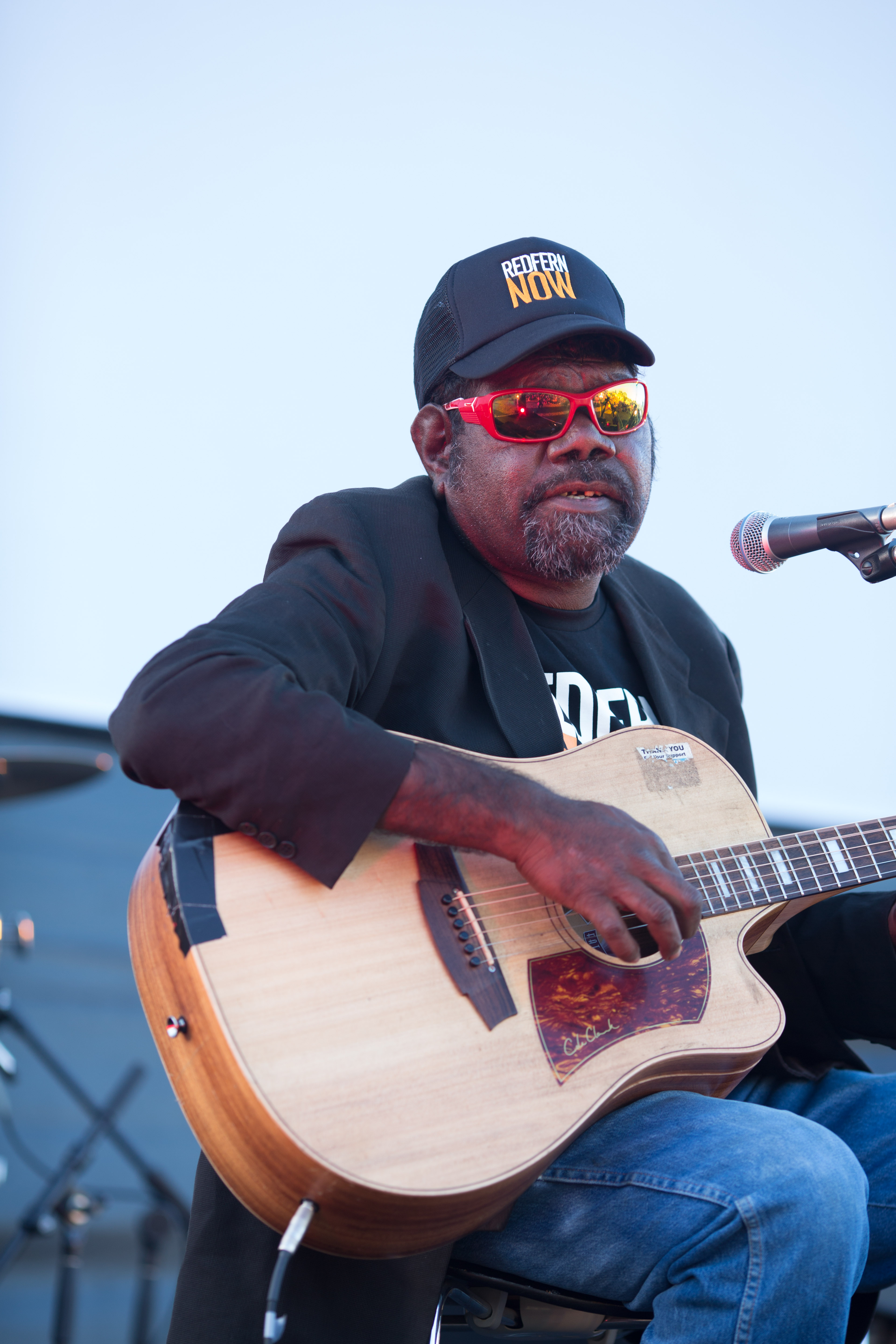
- Yamma performing in October 2013

Background information
- Born: 1969 or 1970 (age 55–56); Northern Territory, Australia
- Genres: Folk, acoustic
- Instruments: Guitar, vocals
- Years active: 1996–present
- Label: Wantok Musik

Frank Yamma (born 1969 or 1970) is an Aboriginal singer and songwriter from Central Australia. He is a Pitjantjatjara man who speaks five languages and sings in both Pitjantjatjara and English. Yamma is the son of Isaac Yamma, an early artist who pioneered singing Western style songs in traditional language.

Starting out singing with his father and brothers Hector, Paul, and Peter, he later formed the band Piranpa. He has toured Australia and internationally, including being invited to perform at festivals such as WOMAD, mainly playing solo.

== Early life and background ==
Frank Yamma was born in 1969 or 1970. He is the son of Isaac Yamma (1940–1990), an early artist who pioneered singing Western style songs in traditional language, and is regarded as one of Australia's most important Indigenous songwriters. He also founded the first national Indigenous radio network.

Frank Yamma grew up in the camps around Alice Springs. He never had any formal training in music, but as a child knew that he wanted to play like his father; he started playing at around seven years of age, and by the age of 10 had his own band.

He is an initiated Pitjantjatjara man who speaks five languages and sings in both Pitjantjatjara and English.

== Career ==
Yamma played in bands for many years, including with his father and three brothers, Hector, Paul, and Peter. During this time he also worked as a stockman, building houses, and other odd jobs.

He had not played outside Central Australia until his career took off after he was invited in January 1997 to play at the Australia Day celebrations. He then started touring Australia and internationally, including many big festivals (see below). He became known for experimenting with a wide range of musical styles and sounds, including blues, lullabies, reggae, and rock music. In January 1998 he released the album Inma Wiru, an album of ambient dance music, in a collaboration with German producer Zeus B. Held.

He formed the band Piranpa, the name derived from a Pitjantjatjara word meaning "skinny white lizards", because all of the other band members were whitefellas. In 1999, Yamma and his band Piranpa released Playing with Fire. His song "Everybody's Talking" from this album was included on the official 2000 Sydney Olympics soundtrack.

In 2005, he composed and performed the song "Pitjantjara" for the film The Alice, and in the same year, his music featured in David Tranter's short documentary film Crookhat and Camphoo.

In 2010, Yamma released the critically-acclaimed Countryman. This album gained international attention, which sparked extensive national and international touring.

In 2014, he released Uncle, to critical acclaim.

In February 2020, Yamma released his debut vinyl album, Tjukurpa: The Story. It received widespread acclaim both in Australia and internationally, including a five-star review in British music magazine Songlines, and earned an ARIA nomination for Best Blues and Roots Album. At the same time, a compilation album called The Kulila Project, featuring longtime collaborators David Bridie and Phil Wales, as well as remixes from Corin, James Henry, and EA Wave's Jinku, Hiribae & Ukweli, was digitally released.

=== Touring and festivals ===
In 2001, he did solo tour of the US, performing in San Francisco, Virginia, Washington, New York, and Santa Fe.

For the 2003 Message Sticks Festival, he wrote and performed 11 songs for three performances at the Sydney Opera House Studio Theatre, with the electronica outfit Wicked Beat Sound System.

His three European tours included playing at WOMAD and the 2012 Cultural Olympiad in the UK; the New Hebridean Festival in Scotland; Festival Bled in Slovenia; and Colours of Ostrava in the Czech Republic.

He has also toured Canada at least twice: the first time in 2014, including at the Vancouver Folk Music Festival, Calgary Folk Music Festival, and Winnipeg Folk Festival, where he shared the stage with Buffy Saint Marie and The Mekons, as well as opening for Joan Baez. In August 2016, he performed at the Lunenburg Folk Harbour Festival in Lunenberg, Nova Scotia; Manitoba Aboriginal Music Week in Winnipeg; at the Wise Hall in Vancouver; and at the Robson Valley Music Festival in Dunster, BC.

Other festivals he has played at include: Livid; WOMAD in the UK and WOMADelaide in Adelaide (2010 and 2021); Moomba; the Yeperenye Festival (2001); Sydney Festival; Byron Bay Bluesfest; Adelaide Guitar Festival On the Road (2022); and Adelaide Fringe (2024).

== Recognition and awards ==
- 1999: Album of the Year at the Deadly Awards 1999, for Playing with Fire
- 2005: Best Original Song Composed for a Feature Film, Telemovie, TV Series or Mini-Series with David Bridie, at the APRA Music Awards of 2005, for "Pitjantjara", from the film The Alice
- 2014: Represented Australia in the official showcase for WOMEX

=== AIR Awards ===
The Australian Independent Record Awards (commonly known informally as AIR Awards) is an annual awards night to recognise, promote and celebrate the success of Australia's Independent Music sector.

Year	Nominee / work	Award	Result
2015	Uncle	Best Independent Country Album	Won

=== APRA Awards ===
The APRA Awards are presented annually from 1982 by the Australasian Performing Right Association (APRA), "honouring composers and songwriters".

Year	Nominee / work	Award	Result
2005	"Pitjantjara" from The Alice (David Bridie & Frank Yamma)	Best Original Song Composed for a Feature Film, Telemovie, TV Series or Mini-Series	Won

=== ARIA Music Awards ===
The ARIA Music Awards is an annual award ceremony event celebrating the Australian music industry. Yamma have been nominated for one award.

Year	Nominee / work	Award	Result
2020	Tjukurpa: The Story	Best Blues & Roots Album	Nominated

=== Deadly Awards ===
The Deadly Awards, commonly known simply as The Deadlys, was an annual celebration of Australian Aboriginal and Torres Strait Islander achievement in music, sport, entertainment and community.

Year	Nominee / work	Award	Result
1999	Playing with Fire	Album Release of the Year:	Won

== Personal life ==
Yamma has lived in Adelaide for many years.

== Discography ==
=== Studio albums ===
Title	Details
Solid Eagle	Released: 1996; Label: CAAMA Music; Format: CD
Playing with Fire (with Piranpa)	Released: 1999; Label: CAAMA Music (CAAMA 326); Format: CD
Keep up the pace (with Piranpa)	Released: 2006; Label: CAAMA Music; Format: CD
Countryman	Released: September 2010; Label: Wantok Music (W0001); Format: CD, digital download
Uncle	Released: 10 October 2014; Label: Wantok Music (W0014); Format: CD, digital download

=== Remix albums ===
Title	Details
The Kulila Project	Released: February 2020; Label: Wantok Music; Format: digital download

=== Compilation albums ===
Title	Details
Tjukurpa: The Story	Released: February 2020; Label: Wantok Music; Format: LP, digital download
