= John Harding (author) =

British author (1951–2017)

- Born: 1951; Ely, Cambridgeshire
- Died: 2017 (aged 65–66); Hammersmith, London
- Education: St Catherine's College, University of Oxford
- Occupation: Author

John Harding (1951 – September 2017) was a British writer and novelist.

== Life and career ==
Harding was born in Prickwillow, a village near Ely, Cambridgeshire, in 1951. He attended local schools before reading English literature at St Catherine's College, Oxford. After university, he moved to London in 1974, where he worked for as a reporter for DC Thomson. After eventually becoming an editor for several popular magazines, Harding went freelance in 1985 to pursue his ambition of becoming a novelist.

His first book novel, What We Did on Our Holiday was published in 2000. The book describes a man taking his father, who has advanced Parkinson's disease, on holiday to Malta. It was adapted for TV in 2006 starring Shane Richie and Roger Lloyd-Pack. Harding would go on to publish four more novels, spanning multiple genres.

Harding was married with two children, and lived in Richmond-upon-Thames. He died in September 2017.

== Works ==
- What We Did on Our Holiday (2000)
- While the Sun Shines (2002)
- One Big Damn Puzzler (2005)
- Florence and Giles (2010)
- The Girl who Couldn't Read (2014)
