= King Tide (band) =

- Genres: Reggae
- Label: Vitamin Records

King Tide is a Sydney-based Reggae band fronted by Tony Hughes. Originally formed for a residency at Bondi's Beach Road Hotel they have since toured around Australia.

== Members ==
- Tony Hughes
- Paul "Snatch" Snashel
- Peter Firth
- Robbie Woolf
- Lindsay Page
- Ross Fotheringham
- Declan Kelly
- Terepai Richmond
- Geoff Innes
- Nathan Shepherd
- Roy Ferrin
- Alex Hewitson
- Tony Gilbert
- Ras Country Man
- Alex Page De Mars
- Sean Collins

== Discography ==
- To Our Dearly Deported (2005) - Vitamin Records
- Scared New World (2006) - Vitamin Records
- Roots Pop Reggae (2009) - Vitamin Records
- Summertime Vibration Pack (2011)
