= Ras Minano =

Ghanaian musician

Ras Minano & the Hope of Africa
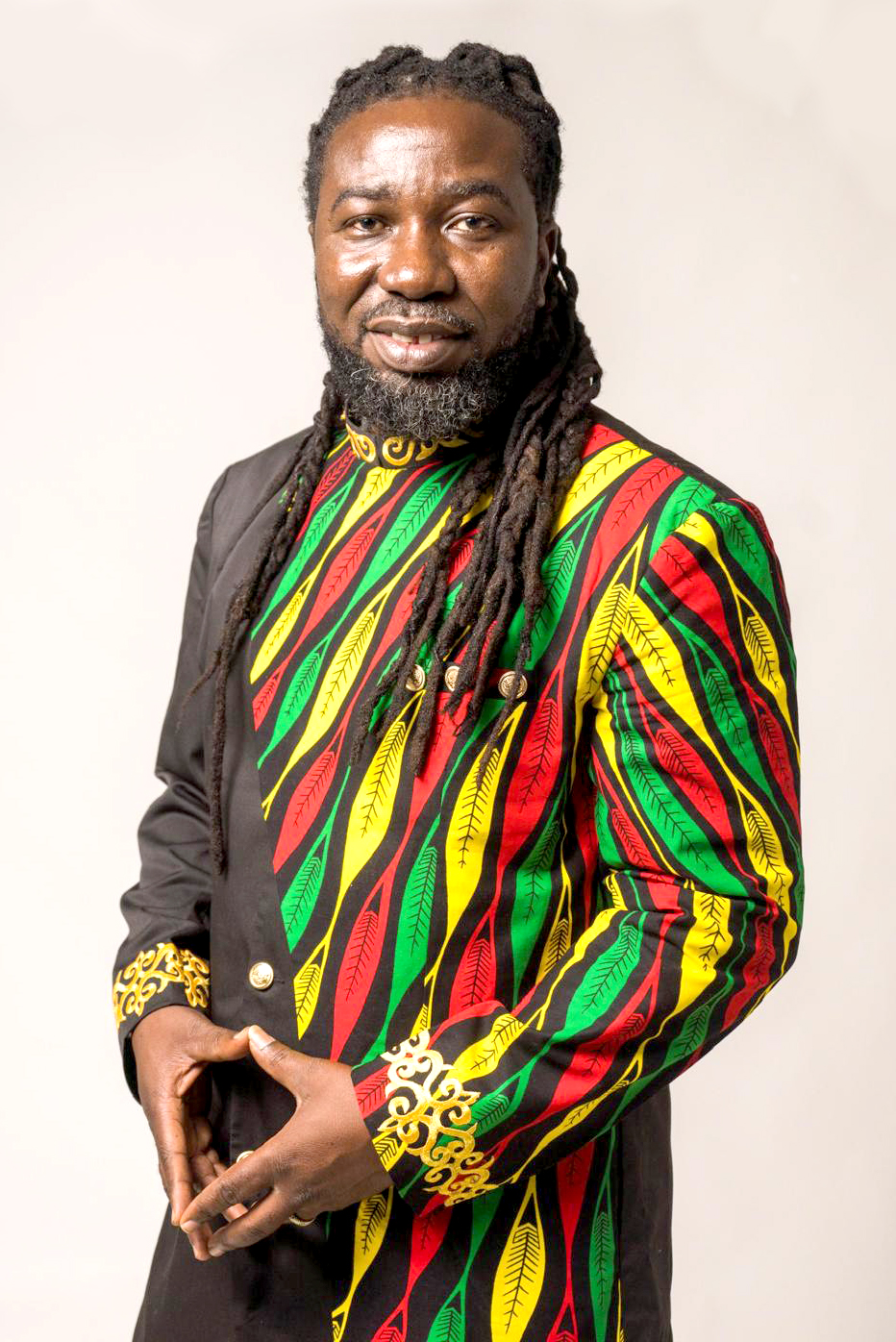
- Ras Minano (2024)
- Born: Accra, Ghana
- Occupations: Drummer, singer, record producer
- Years active: 1999–present

Ras Ekow Minano is a Ghanaian Rastafarian singer, drummer, songwriter and leader of the Hope of Africa Band. He was born in Accra and currently lives in Port Adelaide, South Australia. In 2020, he released his third album, Real Rasta in Australia, following on from previous albums Jah Spirit and Africa is Sick which were released in Ghana. His song Africa Oseeyeii won "Reggae/World Music Song of the Year" at the W.A.M. Awards in 2020. The song also made Minano a semi-finalist in 2020 International Songwriting Contest. In February 2021, Minano released the 3-track EP Womba, the title of which translates to "We are coming" in English. He has released three albums and on EP since 2009. The music of Ras Minano & the Hope of Africa Band combines elements of afrobeat and reggae music and promotes peace, love, harmony and unity.
