= Sharnee Fenwick =

- Genres: Country
- Occupation: Singer
- Instrument: Vocals

Sharnee Fenwick is a country singer from Newcastle, New South Wales. Her song "How 'Bout Never" reached the Top 20 on the Australian Country Music Charts. She won a Deadly in 2006 for best new talent and was nominated in 2007 for single release of the year. She was featured in an episode of SBS's TV series Living Black.

== Discography ==
- Sharnee Fenwick ep (2006)
- "Kiss That Boy" (2007)
