= Sharon-Lee Lane =

Australian country music singer

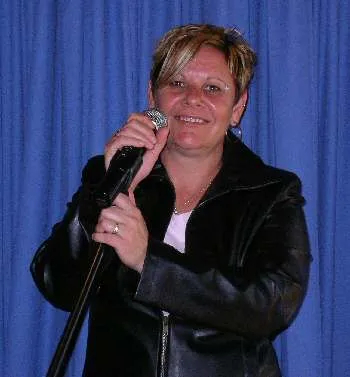
- Sharon Lane around 2007

Background information
- Also known as: Sharon Lane, Shaz
- Origin: Dubbo, New South Wales, Australia
- Genres: Country music
- Occupation: Singer
- Instrument: Vocals
- Years active: 2005-2012

Sharon-Lee Lane is an Australian country music singer. Her music career took off after her battle with cancer was featured on the channel nine TV series RPA, a battle that was revisited on RPA: Where Are They Now?. She won the 2007 Deadly award for most promising new talent.

== Discography ==
- Left It All Behind (2006)
- Second Chance (2007)
