= List of Indigenous Australian performing artists =

This is a list of Indigenous Australian performing artists.

== Circus ==
- Con Colleano – tightrope walker

== Comedy ==
- Mark Bin Bakar – actor and comedian

== Dance ==
- Stephen Page
- Frances Rings

== Film, television and theatre ==
- Kylie Belling – actor
- Burnum Burnum – actor
- Shareena Clanton – actor
- Ernie Dingo – actor and television presenter
- Steve Dodd – actor
- Karla Grant – presenter
- Stan Grant – television presenter
- David Gulpilil – actor
- Leila Gurruwiwi – television presenter, producer
- Grant Hansen – television presenter
- Tom E. Lewis – actor, musician
- Rachael Maza – actor and director
- Gilbert McAdam – television presenter
- Deborah Mailman – actor
- Madeleine Madden – actor
- Roxanne McDonald – actor
- Hunter Page-Lochard – actor, writer, director, television presenter, dancer
- Aaron Pedersen – actor
- Leah Purcell – actor
- Rhoda Roberts – actress, director and arts executive
- Everlyn Sampi – actor
- Justine Saunders – actor
- Ivan Sen – filmmaker
- Mark Coles Smith – actor, musician
- Miranda Tapsell – actor, television presenter
- Noel Tovey – actor
- Robert Tudawali – actor
- Richard Walley – actor, musician
- Brandon Walters – actor
- Sam Watson – novelist and filmmaker
- Thomas Weatherall – actor and playwright
- Googoorewon Knox – actor, dancer and musician

== Indigenous performing arts training institutes ==
- Aboriginal Centre for the Performing Arts
- Aboriginal Islander Dance Theatre
- NAISDA (National Aboriginal and Islander Skills Development Association) Dance College

== Indigenous performing arts companies ==
- Bangarra Dance Theatre

== See also ==
- List of Indigenous Australian musicians
- List of Indigenous Australian writers
- List of Indigenous Australian visual artists
