= Tjupi Band =

Tjupi Band is a Central Australian Indigenous band from the community of Papunya, Northern Territory. They sing in Luritja and English and play desert reggae. The lineup changes depending on who is available and can include Kumunjay Daniels, Sammy Butcher, Jeremiah Butcher, Jason Butcher (from Spin.FX), Malcolm Karpa (from Spin.FX), Esau Marshall (from Spin.FX), Dwayne Abbott, Ethan McDonald, Samuel Inkamala, Desmond Inkamala, George Butcher, Leslie Pearce, keanu Nelson(tjupi band back up vocals) and Peter Lowson. Tjupi Band were featured on an episode of triple j tv's The Hack Half Hour which covered an annual Alice Springs concert, the Bush Bands Bash and won a spot at Triple J's One Night Stand concert in Alice Springs.

== Discography ==
- Kuunyi (Poor Thing) (2004) – CAAMA
- Kutju Ngarala (2008) – CAAMA
- Yananyinya (I'm Going) (2011)
