= Dispossessed (band) =

Australian heavy metal band

- Origin: Sydney
- Genre: Metal
- Years active: 2015–2019
- Past members: Harry Bonifacio; Serwah Attafuah; Jacob Cummins; Jarrod Smith; Marcus Whale; Lauren Guerrera; Birrugan Dunn-Velasco

Dispossessed was an Australian metal band formed in 2015. They sing in a mixture of English and Gumbaynggirr. They have been described as "the most uncompromising, unapologetic and important band in Australia." The band played their final show in November 2019 in Doonside, New South Wales.

== Band members ==
Final line-up

- Serwah Attafuah (guitar)
- Harry Bonifacio Baughan (vocals)
- Jacob Cummins (guitar)
- Jarrod Smith (drums)

Former members

- Birrugan Dunn-Velasco (vocals, guitar)
- Lauren Guerrera (bass)
- Marcus Whale (noise, electronics)

== Discography ==
- Insurgency (2016)
- Warpath Never Ended (2019)
- Dêmocide (2025)
