= Amunda =

Australian rock band

- Origin: Alice Springs, Northern Territory, Australia
- Genres: Reggae/Country/Rock
- Years active: 1985–present
- Labels: CAAMA Music; Larrikin; Stunt
- Past members: refer Member list

Amunda are a rock band from Alice Springs formed in 1985. The band's name is based on Mbantua, the Arrernte word for meeting place, which is associated with the spring at Heavitree Gap in the MacDonnell Ranges at Alice Springs.

In 1992 they played at the Adelaide Fringe Festival, in 1995 the Port Fairy Folk Festival and in 1996 the band played at the Adelaide and Sydney legs of the Big Day Out. They have supported bands including Cruel Sea, Weddings Parties Anything, Ed Kuepper and Things of Stone and Wood.

== Members ==
- Paul Ah Chee – vocals/guitar
- Rachel Perkins – vocals
- Stanley Satour – vocals/bass guitar
- Gerry Laughton – vocals/lead guitar
- Nick Guggisberg – vocals/drums
- Daniel Plain – drums/vocals
- Bill Davis – keyboards
- Kusha Homer – backing vocals
- Rhonda Ross – backing vocals

== Discography ==
=== Studio albums ===
- Better Late Than Never (1989) – Amunda
- Civilised World (1992) – CAAMA/Larrikin
- Pedlar Ave (1995) EP – Stunt

=== Compilation albums (contributing artist) ===
- Beat the Grog (1988) – CAAMA ("Wonder What". Also includes "Ain't No Use In That" by Paul Ah Chee and "Who's Goin' Wipe Their Tears" by Daniel Plain)
- AIDS: How Could I Know (1989) – CAAMA ("How Could I Know")
- Sing Loud, Play Strong (1990) – CAAMA ("1788")
- From the Bush (1990) – CAAMA ("Alice Don't Grow So Fast")
- From the Bush II (1992) – CAAMA ("Heart Beat")
- Our Home, Our Land (1995) – CAAMA ("Climbing The Mountain")
- 25th Anniversary Compilation (2006) – CAAMA ("Climbing The Mountain")
