= The Country Lads =

The Country Lads are an Australian Indigenous band who played country rock with gospel themes. They released two albums through CAAMA Music, The Country Lads (1990) and, with Irwin Inkamala, Hermannsberg Mountain (1990).
