= Spin.FX =

Spin.FX is a Central Australian Indigenous band from the community of Papunya, Northern Territory. They sing in Luritja and play a mixture of reggae, rock, country and traditional sounds. The band's name is a modified spelling of spinifex.

== Members ==
- Stanley Roberts - vocals, guitar
- Derek Williams - vocals, rhythm guitar
- Amos Egan - vocals, lead guitar
- Jason Butcher - drums
- Esau Marshall - bass guitar, keyboards
- Abraham Phillipus - bass
- Leslie Pearce - backing vocals
- Malcom Karpa - backing vocals
- Lance McDonald

== Discography ==
- Ulumburruâ (2000) - CAAMA
- Uluparru (2002) - CAAMA
- Warumpinya (2006) - CAAMA
