= North Tanami Band =

Australian musical group

- Origin: Lajamanu, Australia
- Genres: Reggae, Ska
- Labels: CAAMA Music
- Members: Matthew Patterson - Vocals, Keyboards; Hector Patterson - Lead Guitar, Vocals; Zachariah Patterson - Vocals, Keyboards & Rhythm Guitar; Dwayne Gibson - Drums; Guitar; Roderick Herbert - Rhythm Guitar; Alistair Jigili - Bass; Bradley Rockman - Drums; Dion Patterson - Vocals, Lead Guitar; Michael McDonald - Vocals
- Past members: Ricco Dixon - drums Jarmin Joshua Kelly - bass Rex Patterson - vocals

North Tanami Band are a reggae/ska band from Lajamanu, a town located about 600 km to the north of Yuendumu. The members are Warlpiri and their songs are sung in Warlpiri and English. They were the subjects of the documentary The Traveling Warlpiris (1992).

== Discography ==
Albums

- Warlpiri Warlpiri people (1990) - CAAMA Music
- Travelling Warlpiri (1995) - CAAMA Music
- Warlpiri Tribe (2005) - CAAMA Music
- This Land - CAAMA Music
- Land is our Life (2003) - CAAMA Music
