= Tjintu Desert Band =

Central Australian Indigenous band from Ikuntji

- Also known as: Sunshine Reggae Band
- Origin: Ikuntji Community, Northern Territory
- Genre: desert reggae
- Years active: 2002-
- Label: CAAMA
- Members: Jeffrey Zimran; Joseph Zimran; Terry Marshall; Kieran Multa; Aaron Sharpe
- Past members: Gregory Marshall; Shane Eggley

Tjintu Desert Band is a Central Australian Indigenous band from Ikuntji, a small community 230 kilometres west of Alice Springs. Previously known as Sunshine Reggae or Sunshine Reggae Band they changed their name to include the Luritja word for "sunshine". They sing in a mixture of Luritja and English.

As the Sunshine Reggae Band, they toured with Regional Arts WA Stand Tracks program in 2011 with Nabarlek, and again in 2015 with Rayella as Tjintu Band.

== Discography ==
Sunshine Reggae

- Watjilarrinya Homesick - CAAMA

Tjintu Desert Band

- Tjamuku Ngurra (2014) - CAAMA
