= Isaac Yamma =

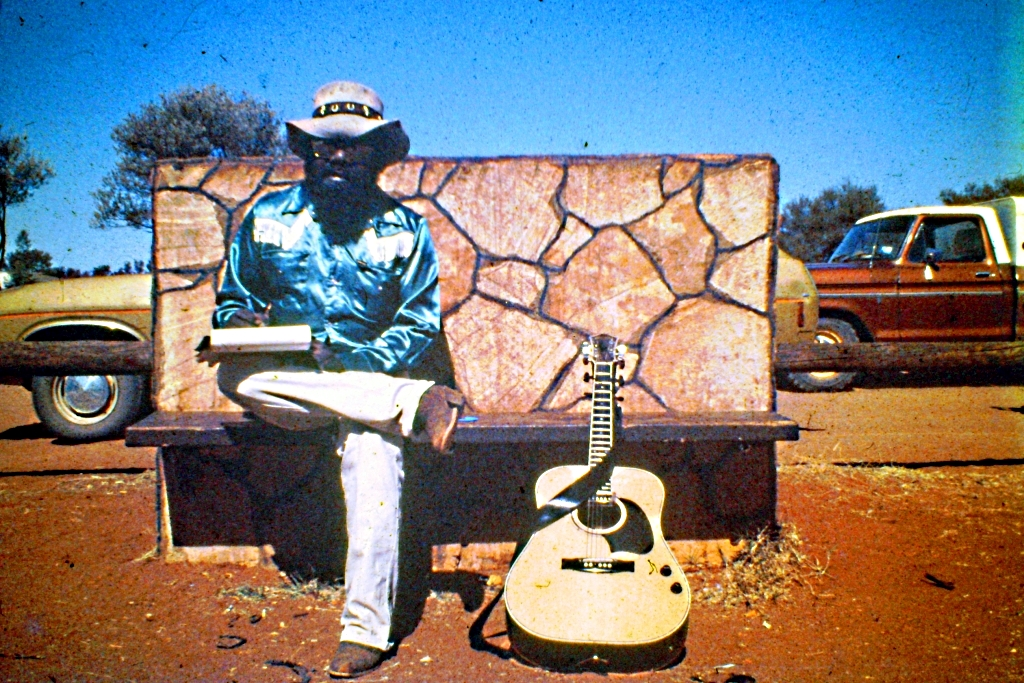
- Isaac Yama outside Ininti Store, Uluru, NT, Australia, in 1983

Background information
- Also known as: Isaac Yama
- Born: 1940; Kaltukatjara, Northern Territory, Australia
- Died: January 1990 (aged 49–50)
- Genres: Country
- Occupation: Musician
- Instruments: Vocals, guitar
- Label: CAAMA Records

Isaac Yamma (1940 – January 1990), also spelt Yama, was a country singer from Central Australia. He is the father of Frank Yamma.

== Early life ==
Isaac Yamma was a Pitjantjatjara man who was born by a waterhole near Docker River (Kaltukatjara) in 1940.

== Career ==
Yamma started his musical career as a member of Areyonga Desert Tigers.

He later performed with his band the Pitjantjatjara Country Band, a band made up of his sons Hector, Frank, Peter, and Paul, and his cousin Russell Yamma. His song were mostly sung in Pitjantjatjara.

He was also a radio host on CAAMA Radio 8KIN FM.

== Death ==
Yamma died in January 1990.

== Discography ==
=== Albums ===
- Isaac Yama and the Pitjantjatjara Country Band (1987) – CAAMA
- Isaac Yama and the Pitjantjatjara Country Band No.2 (1987) – CAAMA

=== Compilations ===
- Papal Concert, Alice Springs (1982) – Imparja
- Desert Songs 1 (1982) – CAAMA
- Desert Songs 2 (1983) – CAAMA
- From the Bush (1990) – CAAMA
- AIDS: How Could I Know (1989) – CAAMA
- 25th Anniversary Compilation 2 (2006) – CAAMA
