= Deadly Awards =

Australian Aboriginal and Torres Strait Islander achievement award

- Awarded for: Australian Aboriginal and Torres Strait Islander achievement
- Country: Australia
- Presented by: Vibe Australia
- First award: 1995
- Final award: 2013
- Website: www.deadlys.com.au

Television/radio coverage
- Network: SBS Television

The Deadly Awards, formally titled National Aboriginal and Torres Strait Islander Music, Sport, Arts and Community Awards and commonly known simply as The Deadlys, was an annual celebration of Australian Aboriginal and Torres Strait Islander achievement in music, sport, entertainment and community. The event was hosted by Vibe Australia, founded by Gavin Jones in 1993, and was held from 1995 to 2013, when government funding was cut.

The Dreamtime Awards are a successor in recognising Indigenous achievements.

== Description ==
The National Aboriginal and Torres Strait Islander Music, Sport, Arts and Community Awards, commonly known as The Deadlys, were an annual celebration of Aboriginal and Torres Strait Islander achievement in music, sport, entertainment and community.

The word "deadly" is a modern colloquialism used by Aboriginal and Torres Strait Islanders to indicate "great or wonderful".

== History ==
The Deadly Awards stemmed from the Boomalli Aboriginal Artists Co-op's 1993 Deadly Sounds music and culture radio show, and were driven by Gavin Jones. Jones created Vibe Australia, a management agency which ran The Deadlys, among other events, and the first Deadlys (then the National Aboriginal and Torres Strait Islander Music, Sport, Arts and Community Awards) were held in 1995 at the Boomalli Aboriginal Artists Co-op in the Redfern suburb of Sydney.

Over the next few years, their venue shifted through The Metro Theatre, the Hard Rock Café, Home in Darling Harbour, Fox Studios, and others. Then 2001 began The Deadlys residency at the Sydney Opera House, from where the annual gala was broadcast by National Indigenous Television.

The Deadly Awards earlier growth continued, along with widening regard as a community and Australian institution. Anchored by their annual event held at the Opera House (hosted by Jones' Vibe Australia), later years added venues in other states. Expansion also happened beyond their original music focus to include sport, entertainment, the arts, health, education and training in the Indigenous Australian community, and candidates began to be nominated and voted on by the public.

The last Deadlys were held in 2013.

== Cancellation ==
In June 2014 it was announced by the Abbott government that funding for the Vibe Project would be cut from 1 July, in measures designed to reallocate funding to Indigenous education programs and other frontline services. Deadly funding in that year was phased back to $1 million and no funding provided for future years. All Vibe projects, including The Deadly Sounds radio show concluded on 30 June 2014.

On 12 July 2014, Gavin Jones was found dead. After a story was run on Triple J's Hack program on 15 July 2014, a groundswell of community support for saving the Deadly Awards began. A petition on Change.org attracted over 26,000 signatures and a Kickstarter campaign reached A$6,699.

Vibe Australia announced on 14 July 2014 that the 20th edition of the event, due to be held at the Sydney Opera House on 30 September 2014, would not occur.

In November 2017, the National Dreamtime Awards were launched to fill the void in recognising Indigenous achievements as a result of the cessation of the Deadly Awards.

== See also ==
- List of television awards
- Indigenous Australian music
