= Amazing: The Best of Alex Lloyd =

Compilation album by Alex Lloyd
- Released: September 2006
- Recorded: 1998–2006
- Genres: Pop rock; alternative rock
- Label: EMI Music Australia
- Producers: Alex Lloyd; Magnus Fiennes; Rick Parashar; Stuart Miller

Alex Lloyd chronology
Alex Lloyd (2005)	Amazing: The Best of Alex Lloyd (2006)	Good in the Face of a Stranger (2008)

Amazing: The Best of Alex Lloyd is the first compilation album released in September 2006 by Australian singer-songwriter Alex Lloyd. The album peaked at number 34, becoming his fifth top 50 album, but first not to peak within the top 10.

== Track listing ==
CD1

1. "Amazing"
2. "Coming Home"
3. "Never Meant to Fail"
4. "Beautiful"
5. "Black the Sun"
6. "Green"
7. "My Way Home" (remix)
8. "Momo"
9. "Save My Soul"
10. "Lucky Star"
11. "Bus Ride"
12. "Downtown"
13. "The Wonder"
14. "Everybody's Laughing"
15. "1000 Miles"
16. "Peepshow"
17. "Something Special"

CD2

1. "A Break Outside"
2. "Once"
3. "Red Guitar"
4. "Pretenders"
5. "Waiting for the Youth to Come In"
6. "Backbird"
7. "Travel Log"
8. "Golden Slumbers"
9. "Distant Angels"
10. "Latino"
11. "Lucky Seven"
12. "Learning How to Run"
13. "Mystery Train"
14. "Summer Garden"
15. "Don't Let It Bring You Down"
16. "Self-Defence"

== Charts ==
=== Weekly charts ===
Chart (2006)	Peak position
Australian Albums (ARIA)	34
