= Acoustica (Alex Lloyd album) =

Studio album by Alex Lloyd
- Released: August 5, 2016
- Recorded: 2016
- Label: Liberation Music

Alex Lloyd chronology
Urban Wilderness (2013)	Acoustica (2016)

Acoustica is the seventh studio album from Australian singer-songwriter, Alex Lloyd. The album features re-recordings of some of his previous material. The album was released in August 2016 and peaked at number 45 on the ARIA Albums Chart.

In an interview with APN, Lloyd said; "When I was asked to do this record last year I didn't have a whole record myself to put out so it was a good opportunity for me to go back and play around with some old stuff" adding "I really just tried to keep it simple and beautiful, minimalizing the amount of instrumentation and really trying to make a nice record in a short amount of time. I gave myself three weeks as I have a tendency to over-produce things."

== Track listing ==
1. "Amazing"
2. "Easy Exit Station"
3. "Better the Less You Know"
4. "Green"
5. "Coming Home"
6. "Good Thing"
7. "Hallelujah"
8. "Beautiful"
9. "Brand New Day"
10. "Black the Sun"
11. "Never Meant to Fail"
12. "Everybody's Laughing"

== Weekly charts ==
Chart (2016)	Peak position
Australian Albums (ARIA)	45

== Release history ==
Region	Date	Format	Label	Catalogue
Australia	August 5, 2016	CD, digital download	Liberation Music	LMCD0284
