= Stephen Pigram =

Australian musician and songwriter (born 1960)

- Born: 1960 (age 65–66)
- Origin: Broome, Western Australia, Australia
- Genres: Calypso; reggae; Indigenous; rock; country
- Occupation: Musician
- Instruments: Vocals; acoustic guitar; harmonica; requinto; valiha; ukulele; dulcimer
- Years active: 1977–present

Stephen Pigram (born 1960) is an Australian musician, songwriter and member of the Yawuru people.

He has been a member of Kuckles (1981–82), Scrap Metal (1983–95) and the Pigram Brothers (1996–present). With his brother, Alan Pigram, and joined by Alex Lloyd, he worked on the soundtrack of Mad Bastards, a film he co-produced with Alan, Brendan Fletcher and David Jowsey. Pigram released a solo album, Wanderer, in 2013.

== Biography ==
Stephen Pigram was born on 20 January 1960 and has performed together with his brothers, Alan and Philip, in Broome, since 1977. Their early groups were Crossfire and then Sunburn.

Pigram was a member of Calypso and reggae band, Kuckles, formed in Adelaide in 1981 with Jimmy Chi on lead vocals. Other members were Mick Manolis, Garry Gower and Patrick Bin Amat. They disbanded late in 1982. The band co-created Chi's musicals, Bran Nue Dae and Corrugation Road.

Along with Alan and Philip, Pigram was a founding member of Scrap Metal, a rock, country and reggae band in 1983. Together they toured nationally and released four albums before breaking up in 1995. Alan, Steven and Phillip then joined up with their other brothers David, Colin, Gavin and Peter to form the Pigram Brothers. In 2006, along with Alan, he was inducted into the Western Australian Music Hall of Fame. They were nominated for an ARIA Music Award in 2012 for Best World Music Album.

He worked on the 2011 film, Mad Bastards, co-produced by Brendan Fletcher, David Jowsey and Alan Pigram. With Alex Lloyd and Alan Pigram he created the film score and recorded the soundtrack album. He received award nominations for the film. Two AACTA Award nominations, AFI Members' Choice Award and Best Film (both with Fletcher, Jowsey and Alan Pigram). An APRA Music Award nomination for Feature Film Score of the Year (with Fletcher and Alan Pigram). An Inside Film Awards win. An ARIA Music Award for Best Original Soundtrack, Cast or Show Album (with Lloyd and Alan Pigram).

== Discography ==
=== Albums ===
List of albums, with selected details
Title	Details
Wanderer	Released: 2013; Format: CD; Label: Stephen Pigram (SPCD12013)

== Awards and nominations ==
Pigram received a Red Ochre Award for Lifetime Achievement in Artistic Excellence in 2026.

=== ARIA Music Awards ===
The ARIA Music Awards is an annual awards ceremony that recognises excellence, innovation, and achievement across all genres of Australian music. They commenced in 1987.

Year	Nominee / work	Award	Result	Ref.
2011	Mad Bastards (as The Pigram Brothers with Alex Lloyd)	Best Original Soundtrack, Cast or Show Album	Nominated	
