= Stephen Albert (actor) =

Indigenous Australian actor and singer (1950–2019)

Stephen "Baamba" Albert (1950 – 13 November 2019) was an Indigenous Australian actor and singer. He starred in the musicals Bran Nue Dae and Corrugation Road.

Albert was born in the Western Australian town of Broome. He grew up with his mother, a Bardi woman, and his stepfather, a Japanese man who had worked in Broome's pearling industry. He was influenced by members of his extended family who had learnt orchestral instruments at the leprosarium near Derby. Initially taking up training as an apprentice diesel mechanic, his professional musical career began in 1968 with the band Broome Beats, which fused Indigenous, Asian, and European musical influences. His performance career included working for Jimmy Chi in Bran Nue Dae and Corrugation Road, as the sidekick for Mary G, appeared in the SBS drama series The Circuit and presented the Bobtales TV series.

Albert was also the first chairman of the National Aboriginal Education Committee and was the director of Goolarri Media.

Albert was part of the local community who formed the Broome Aboriginal Media Association who own the Goolarri Media Enterprises. Goolarri Media operate two TV stations and one radio station broadcasting from Broome in the Kimberley region. He died at a Perth hospital on 13 November 2019, aged 69.
