= Bran Nue Dae (film) =

- Theatrical release poster
- Directed by: Rachel Perkins
- Screenplay by: Reg Cribb; Rachel Perkins
- Based on: Bran Nue Dae by Jimmy Chi
- Produced by: Robyn Kershaw; Graeme Isaac
- Starring: Rocky McKenzie; Jessica Mauboy; Ernie Dingo; Missy Higgins; Geoffrey Rush
- Cinematography: Andrew Lesnie
- Edited by: Rochelle Oshlack
- Music by: Cezary Skubiszewski
- Production companies: Film Victoria; Mayfan; Omnilab Media; Robyn Kershaw Productions; Screen Australia
- Distributed by: Roadshow Films
- Release dates: 9 August 2009 (Melbourne); 14 January 2010
- Running time: 85 minutes
- Country: Australia
- Language: English
- Budget: A$7 million
- Box office: A$7.5 million

Bran Nue Dae is a 2009 Australian musical comedy-drama film directed by Rachel Perkins and written by Perkins and Reg Cribb. A feature film adaptation of the 1990 stage musical Bran Nue Dae by Jimmy Chi, the film tells the story of the coming of age of an Aboriginal Australian teenager on a road trip in the late 1960s.

== Plot ==
In Broome in 1969, Willie Johnson is having trouble wooing his girl Rosie, who ends up with a bandleader named Lester. His mother Theresa sends him back to boarding school in Perth to continue his education for the priesthood. One night, he and several others steal food from the college kitchen but are caught. Willie admits to being the thief, but runs away before he can be punished. He spends the night on the streets of Perth before meeting up with 'Uncle' Tadpole, who offers to help him get home. They go to Fremantle, where Tadpole allows himself to be run over by a Kombi van, hoping that the two hippies inside will help him. Not realising how far it will be to Broome, the hippies, 'Slippery' the German and Annie, his girlfriend, agree to drive them.

Father Benedictus, head of the college, has seen Willie's potential and determines to locate him; through Tadpole's homeless friends, he learns that Willie is heading to Broome. The travellers drive north, stopping at a roadhouse where Willie meets the tarty "Roadhouse Betty". Tadpole steals some food, a bottle of wine, and an audio tape, nearly causing them to get shot by Betty, but they manage to escape. Slippery becomes disillusioned, and leaves Willie and Tadpole behind in the middle of nowhere; Tadpole curses the hippies by pointing a bone, and the van promptly breaks down.

Willie then gets a ride with a passing truck carrying the members of a football team. They end up in Port Hedland where he meets flirty Roxanne, who takes him to the 'condom tree' and offers to 'show him a good time', but her boyfriend turns up and a fight ensues. Willie is rescued by Tadpole, who says that all young men end up there at some point. The next morning, they are driving along a desert road when a hung-over Roxanne emerges from the back seat, startling everyone. While smoking some pot, they are discovered by police and arrested, despite Annie's attempts at stopping the police from arresting them. At the police station, Slippery reveals that his real name is Wolfgang Benedictus. The police then put them in a jail cell for a night.

They are released next morning, and drive on to Broome, where they go to the bar where Rosie is performing. Willie tries to win her back, but ends up in a fight with Lester, only to be disrupted by a church temperance march, which invites everyone to the beach to testify. Willie tells Rosie he loves her, and they kiss. At the beach, Willie's mother reveals that she had a son to another man, who turns out to be Father Benedictus. Wolfgang is their son. Tadpole is spotted by Willie's mother, and she tells Willie that he is Tadpole's son.

== Cast ==
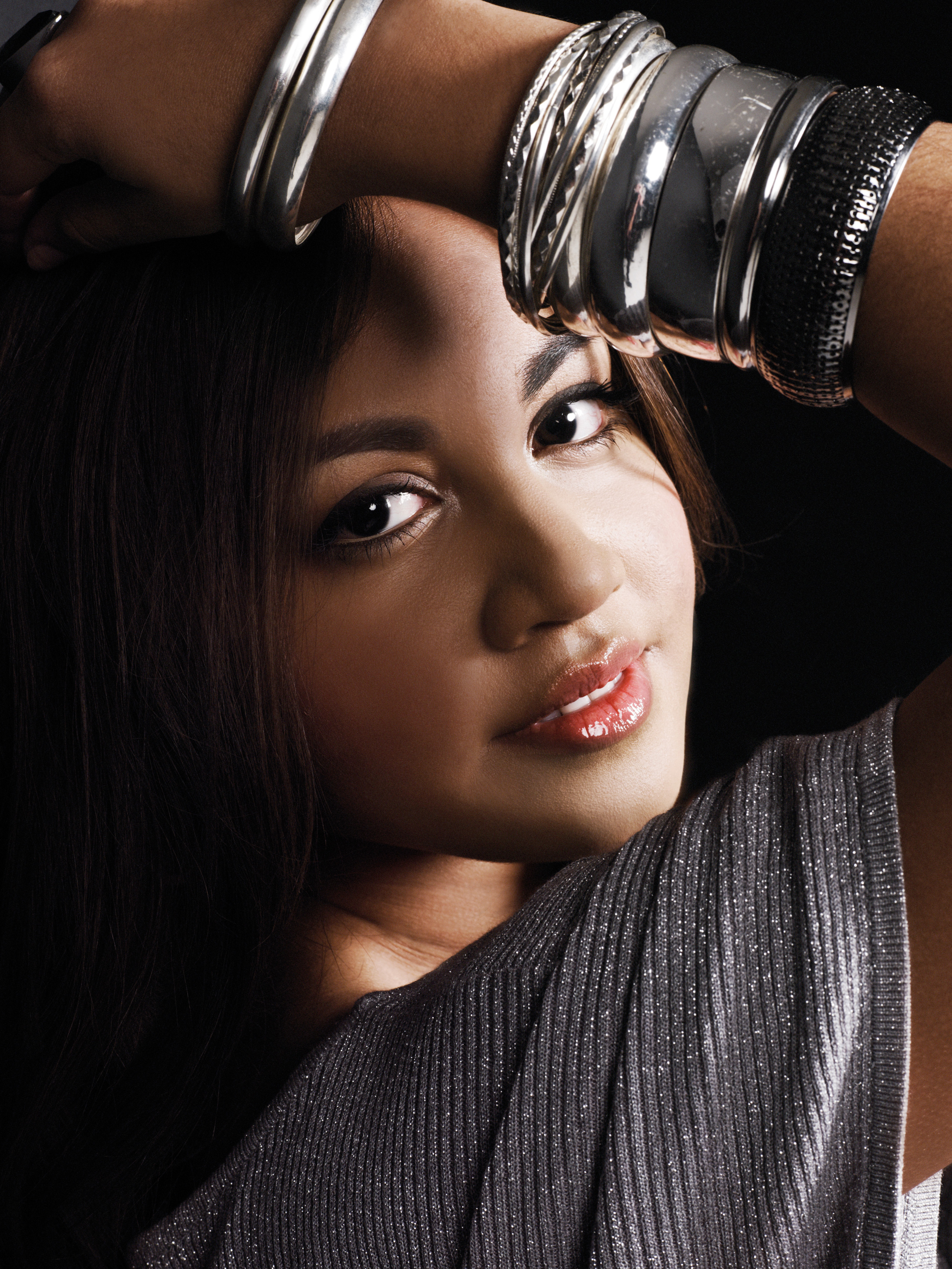
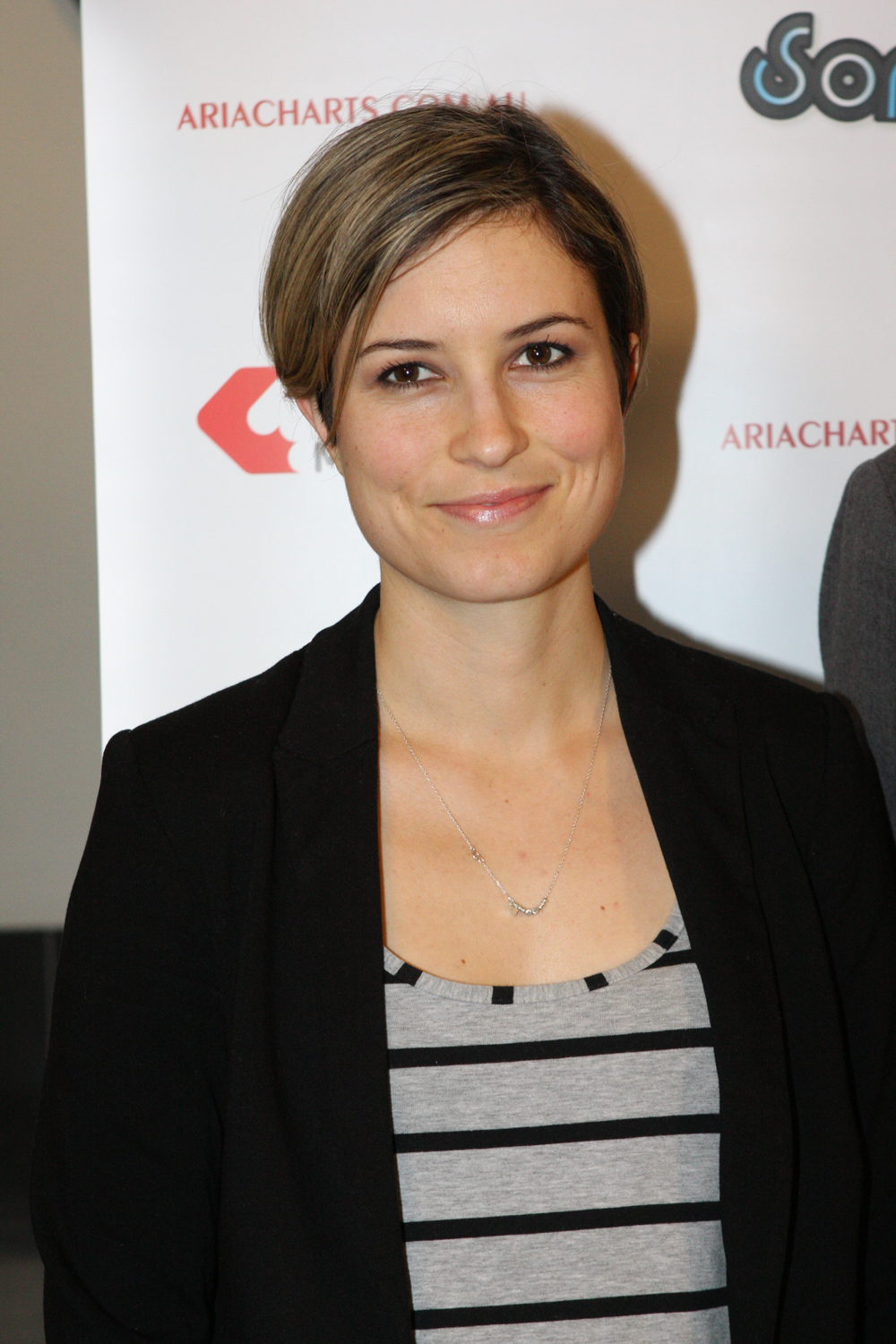
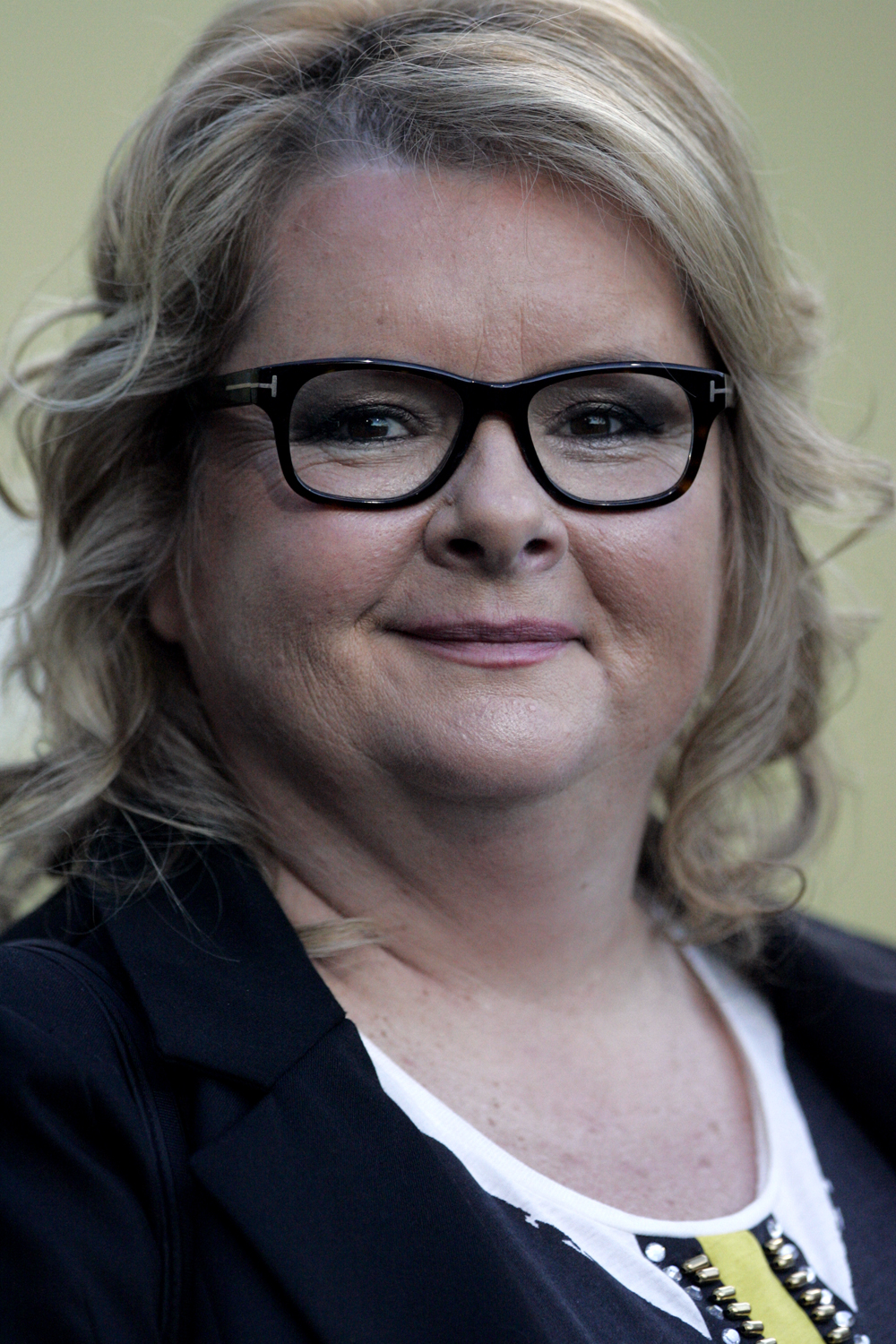
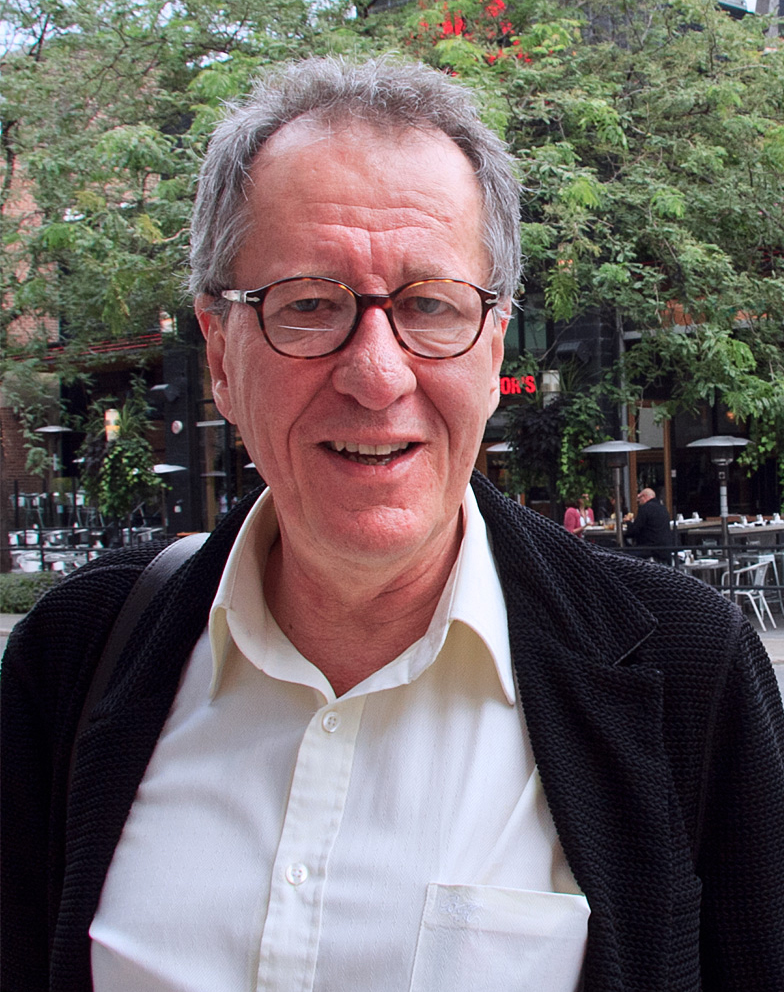
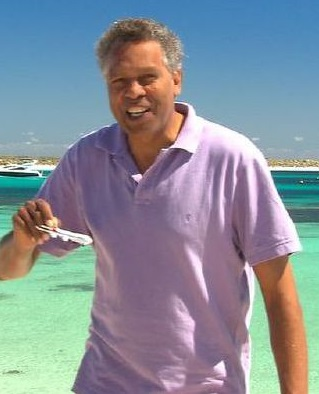
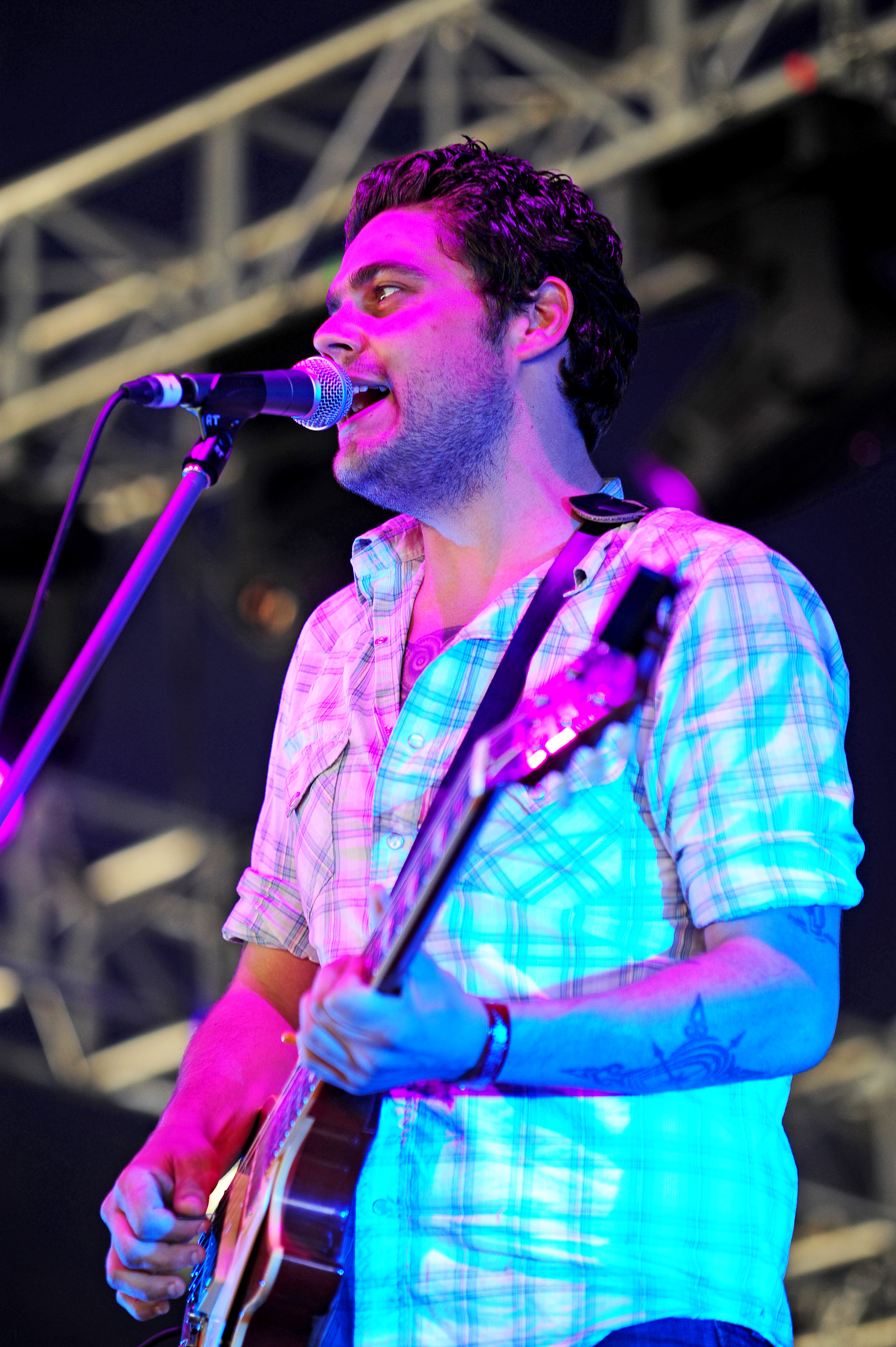
Jessica Mauboy, Missy Higgins, Magda Szubanski, (top) Geoffrey Rush, Ernie Dingo, and Dan Sultan (bottom) play the actors on Australian musician film.
- Rocky McKenzie as William "Willie" Johnson, the film's protagonist; a rebellious teenage boy who escapes the Catholic Mission in Perth to return to his home in Broome.
- Jessica Mauboy as Rosie, an aspiring singer and the love of Willie's life. Mauboy, who was runner-up in the fourth season of Australian Idol, makes her acting debut.
- Ernie Dingo as Stephen "Uncle Tadpole" Johnson, a drunk who accompanies Willie on his adventure. Dingo played the role of Tadpole in the original production of the stage play Bran Nue Dae in 1989.
- Missy Higgins as Annie, Slippery's spiritual girlfriend who is travelling with him to Perth. This is Higgins' acting debut.
- Geoffrey Rush as Father Benedictus, the film's antagonist; as a strict German priest who runs the Catholic Mission in Perth training young men to become priests, he pursues Willie who ran away from the school. The role was offered to Rush by director Perkins.
- Tom Budge as Slippery, a German hippie tourist travelling with his girlfriend Annie in a Kombi van.
- Deborah Mailman as Roxanne.
- Ningali Lawford as Theresa, Willie's mother. Ningali is one of the cast members from the original 1989 stage production of Bran Nue Dae.
- Stephen "Baamba" Albert as Pastor Flaggon. Stephen is also one of the cast members from the original 1989 stage production of Bran Nue Dae.
- Dan Sultan as Lester, the local band leader who finds himself in love with Rosie.
- Magda Szubanski as Roadhouse Betty, the frisky owner of a roadhouse.

== Release ==
Bran Nue Dae premiered at the Melbourne International Film Festival on its closing night on 8 August 2009. The film made its international debut at the Toronto International Film Festival at the Scotiabank Theatre on 12 September 2009. It was also among the lineup of out-of-competition films to be screened at the Sundance Film Festival in 2010, and screened at the Antipodean Film Festival in Saint Tropez, France, in October 2010.

The film made its official theatrical premiere at the Sun Pictures theatre in Broome, Western Australia on 8 December 2009, where the stars of the film walked a "red dirt" carpet. In the lead up to the premiere on the day, stars of the film Mauboy, Sultan, Higgins, and Dingo put on a public performance with the Kuckles band in Broome's Chinatown.

=== Box office ===
The film was theatrically released in Australia on 14 January 2010 and had an opening weekend rank of No. 6, averaging $6,977 at 231 screens for a gross of $1.6 million, $3.7 million in its first two weeks and eventually grossing more than $7.5 million. The film "... has since become one of the Top 50 Australian films of all time at the local box office."

=== Critical reception ===
The film received generally mixed reviews. Review aggregator website Rotten Tomatoes reports that 56% of critics have given the film a positive review, based on 61 reviews with an average score of 5.9/10. The website's critical consensus is: "It's original and high-spirited, but Bran Nue Dae is also uneven and sometimes overly kitschy." On Metacritic, the film has a weighted average score of 54 out of 100, based on 22 critics, indicating "mixed or average reviews".

Dennis Harvey of Variety said "It retains that dated once-almost-hip look – like Up with People", but it contained "blandly stereotypical characters in a trite road-trip narrative" and in regards to younger audiences, claimed "There's scant real dancing, mostly forgettable, showtune-type songs and no ethnic authenticity." Craig Mathieson of SBS Films commented that "Bran Nue Dae has a daffy, garish energy that's reflected in brisk pacing and up-tempo tunes". On director Perkins, he stated "Visually, Perkins is not a natural fit for this material", comparing it to her 1998 feature Radiance, but "here she enthusiastically takes to the moments of farce and productions numbers." Mathieson added that the "frames feel cluttered, with an occasional echo of the amped-up musical melodrama" but concluded approvingly that Bran Nue Dae was similar to the 1982 Australian musical film Starstruck in that it "carries the day with energy and self-belief." The Age's Philippa Hawker praised the cast, stating Dingo was "terrific as Uncle Tadpole", for Rush who "brings an idiosyncratic physical energy and an extravagant German accent to the role" and newcomer Jessica Mauboy brought "sweetness and confidence to the role of Rosie".

=== Accolades ===
The following is a list of awards that Bran Nue Dae or the cast have been nominated for or won:

Wins

- Melbourne International Film Festival awards
  - Audience award for Best Feature

Nominations

- 2009 Toronto International Film Festival
  - People's Choice Award

Award	Category	Subject	Result
AACTA Awards (2010 AFI Awards)	Best Supporting Actress	Deborah Mailman	Won
AACTA Awards (2010 AFI Awards)	Best Original Music Score	Cezary Skubiszewski; Jimmy Chi; Patrick Duttoo Bin Amat; Garry Gower; Michael Manolis Mavromatis; Stephen Pigram	Nominated
AACTA Awards (2010 AFI Awards)	Best Sound	Andrew Neil; Steve Burgess; Peter Mills; Mario Vaccaro; Blair Slater; David Bridie; Scott Montgomery	Nominated
AACTA Awards (2010 AFI Awards)	Best Costume Design	Margot Wilson	Nominated
AACTA Awards (2010 AFI Awards)	Macquarie AFI Award for Best Adapted Screenplay	Reg Cribb; Rachel Perkins; Jimmy Chi	Nominated
FCCA Awards	Best Music Score	Cezary Skubiszewski	Won
FCCA Awards	Best Supporting Actress	Deborah Mailman	Nominated
FCCA Awards	Best Director	Rachel Perkins	Nominated
FCCA Awards	Best Film	Robyn Kershaw; Graeme Isaac	Nominated

== Soundtrack ==
Bran Nue Dae-Official Soundtrack

Soundtrack album by Various Artists
- Released: 15 January 2010
- Genres: Rhythm & Blues; Pop; Rock and Roll
- Length: 58:25
- Label: Sony Music Australia
- Producers: David Bridie; Cezary Skubiszewski

The official soundtrack was released on 15 January 2010. At the ARIA Music Awards of 2010 the soundtrack was nominated for ARIA Award for Best Original Soundtrack, Cast or Show Album.

All tracks are written by Jimmy Chi and Kuckles.

No.	Title	Performer(s)	Length
1.	"Bran Nue Dae"	Dan Sultan	2:06
2.	"All The Way Jesus"	Jessica Mauboy	2:34
3.	"Seeds That You Might Sow"	Dan Sultan	2:19
4.	"Feel Like Going Back Home"	Ernie Dingo & Missy Higgins	2:19
5.	"Light a Light"	Jessica Mauboy & Brendon Boney	2:46
6.	"Nothing I Would Rather Be"	Bran Nue Dae Cast	1:55
7.	"Nyul Nyul Girl"	Dan Sultan	2:42
8.	"Broome Love Theme"	Bran Nue Dae Gypsy Orchestra	2:06
9.	"Long Way Away from My Country"	Ernie Dingo	2:34
10.	"Is You Mah Baby"	Ernie Dingo	2:37
11.	"Six White Boomers"	Rolf Harris	3:22
12.	"Zorba's Dance"	David Bridie	2:12
13.	"Afterglow"	Missy Higgins	3:13
14.	"Listen to the News"	Ernie Dingo	4:43
15.	"Black Girl"	Dan Sultan	4:10
16.	"Stand by Your Man"	Jessica Mauboy	2:56
17.	"Nothing I Would Rather Be"	Brendon Boney and Geoffrey Rush	1:52
18.	"Road Movie Medley"	Bran Nue Dae Gypsy Orchestra	1:54
19.	"Child of Glory"	Bob Faggetter	1:58
20.	"Going Back Home"	Stephen Pigram	3:42
21.	"Bran Nue Dae (Millya Rumarra Recording)"	Jimmy Chi	4:25

=== Charts ===
Chart (2010)	Peak position
Australian ARIA Albums Chart	29

== See also ==
- Cinema of Australia
