= Jimmy Chi =

Australian composer, musician, and playwright (1948–2017)

- Born: 1948; Broome, Western Australia, Australia
- Died: 26 June 2017 (aged 69); Broome
- Writing career
- Notable works: Bran Nue Dae; Corrugation Road

James Ronald Chi (1948 – 26 June 2017) was an Australian composer, musician and playwright. His best known work is the 1990 musical Bran Nue Dae, which was adapted for film in 2009.

== Early life and education ==
James Ronald Chi was born in Broome, Western Australia in 1948 to a father of Chinese and Japanese descent and a mother of Scottish and Aboriginal (Bardi and Nyulnyul) descent.

Chi attended a Catholic school in Perth, and went on to university in WA. However, he was involved in a serious car accident, and, after coming out of a three-week coma, developed bipolar affective disorder. He became severely depressed, but was helped by his faith.

After returning to Broome in 1970, he bought a guitar and started writing songs, initially on his own. Stephen Pigram and Michael Manolis joined him in songwriting, and in the early 1980s the three of them, along with Garry Gower and Patrick Bin Amat moved to Adelaide, South Australia, to study music at the Centre for Aboriginal Studies in Music (CASM) and the University of Adelaide.

== Career ==
The five friends from Broome formed the band Kuckles in 1981, with Chi as one of the three songwriters, along with Manolis and Pigram.

Chi's most acclaimed work is Bran Nue Dae, written in collaboration with his band Kuckles, Scrap Metal, The Pigram Brothers, and friends. Bran Nue Dae is a partly autobiographical work which took many years to write. It celebrates family, forgiveness, and reconciliation, and was a hit at the Festival of Perth in 1990 where it was performed by the Black Swan Theatre. It went on to tour Australia extensively and it was Australia's most successful musical play of the early 1990s. A documentary film about it was made in 1991.

One of the famous verses from a song in the musical sums up Chi's dry humour and sharp political approach:

There's nothing I would rather be

Than to be an Aborigine
and watch you take my precious land away.
For nothing gives me greater joy
than to watch you fill each girl and boy

with superficial existential shit.

The musical won the prestigious Sidney Myer Performing Arts Awards in 1990. The following year the published script and score won the Special Award in the Western Australian Premier's Book Awards. It brought acclaim for many Aboriginal artists, including Ernie Dingo, Josie Ningali Lawford, and Leah Purcell, and its success was key in the establishment of the Black Swan Theatre Company.

Chi also wrote the musical Corrugation Road, which was first performed by the Black Swan Theatre at the Fairfax Studio in Melbourne in 1996 before an Australian national tour. Corrugation Road concerns mental health, abuse, sexuality, and religion.

Chi's songs have been covered by such artists as the Irish singer Mary Black and Aboriginal singer Archie Roach.

Broome's Opera Under the Stars festival has featured Chi's "Child of Glory", from Bran Nue Dae, at every festival since 1993. His hymns are regularly sung at Aboriginal funerals in Broome.

== Other activities ==
Chi was patron of SANE Australia.

== Awards and honours ==
In 1991, Chi was awarded the Human Rights and Equal Opportunity Commission Drama Award for Bran Nue Dae.

Che was awarded the Centenary Medal by the federal government, for his contribution to Australian society, and he was acknowledged by the WA Government as a State Living Treasure.

=== Australia Council for the Arts ===
The Australia Council for the Arts is the arts funding and advisory body for the Government of Australia. Since 1993, it has awarded a Red Ochre Award. It is presented to an outstanding Indigenous Australian (Aboriginal Australian or Torres Strait Islander) artist for lifetime achievement.

| Year | Nominee / work | Award | Result |
|---|---|---|---|
| 1997 | himself | Red Ochre Award | Awarded |

=== Deadly Awards ===
The Deadly Awards were an annual celebration of Australian Aboriginal and Torres Strait Islander achievement in music, sport, entertainment and community. They ran from 1995 to 2013.

| Year | Nominee / work | Award | Result (wins only) |
|---|---|---|---|
| 1998 | Corrugation Road (with Kuckles and The Pigram Brothers) | Excellence in Film or Theatrical Score | Won |

== Later life and death ==
Chi spent most of his later life at home in Broome with his family and friends. He died in Broome Hospital on 26 June 2017.

An inquest into his death published its results in 2019. It said that Chi had been an involuntary patient under the Mental Health Act 2014, and had died in the emergency department from chronic obstructive pulmonary disease and coronary atherosclerosis, although he had also suffered from a number of other diseases.

== Discography ==
| Title | Details |
|---|---|
| Bran Nue Dae - Original Cast Recording (with Kuckles) | Released: 1993; Label: BND Records Pty Ltd, PolyGram (BNDCD 002); Format: CD, Cassette |
| Corrugation Road (with The Pigram Brothers and Kuckles) | Released: 1997; Label: Angoorrabin (AR-8); Format: CD |

== Works ==
- Broome songwriters with Michael Manolis and Ron Harper (Hodja Educational Resources, 1985) ISBN 0-949575-37-2
- Bran Nue Dae (Currency Press, 1991) ISBN 0-86819-293-7
- Corrugation Road (sound recording – Angoorrabin Records, p1996)
