= Pigram =

Pigram is a surname.

== People ==
Notable people with the name include:

- Alan Pigram, Australian musician and songwriter
- Courtney Pigram (born 1985), American professional basketball player
- Dalisa Pigram, Australian choreographer, co-director of Marrugeku dance company
- Ngaire Pigram, Australian singer, dancer, actor, screenwriter, and director
- Wayne Pigram, Australian actor known as Wayne Pygram
- Tom Pigram, English theatre actor

== Fictional characters ==
- William Pigram, a character in a series of crime novels by British author Janet Laurence

== See also ==
- The Pigram Brothers, a seven-piece Indigenous Australian band (including Alan and Stephen Pigram)
