= Deadly Awards 1998 =

Australian Aboriginal and Torres Strait Islander annual music awards

The Deadly Awards were an annual celebration of Australian Aboriginal and Torres Strait Islander achievement in music, sport, entertainment and community. Winners of the 1998 Deadlys were:

== Music ==
- Outstanding Contribution to Aboriginal Music – CAAMA
- Most Promising New Talent – Native Ryme Syndicate
- Male Artist of The Year – Archie Roach
- Female Artist of The Year – Christine Anu
- Album Release of The Year – The Pigram Brothers, Saltwater Country
- Band of The Year – NoKTuRNL
- Single Release of The Year – Warren H Williams, Raining on the Rock

== Arts ==
- Excellence in Film or Theatrical Score – Jimmy Chi, Kuckles, The Pigram Brothers – Corrugation Road

== Community ==
- Aboriginal Broadcaster of The Year – Mary Geddardyu (Mary G alter ego of Mark Bin Bakar), Radio Goolarri
