= Delsinki =

Melbourne based musician and producer

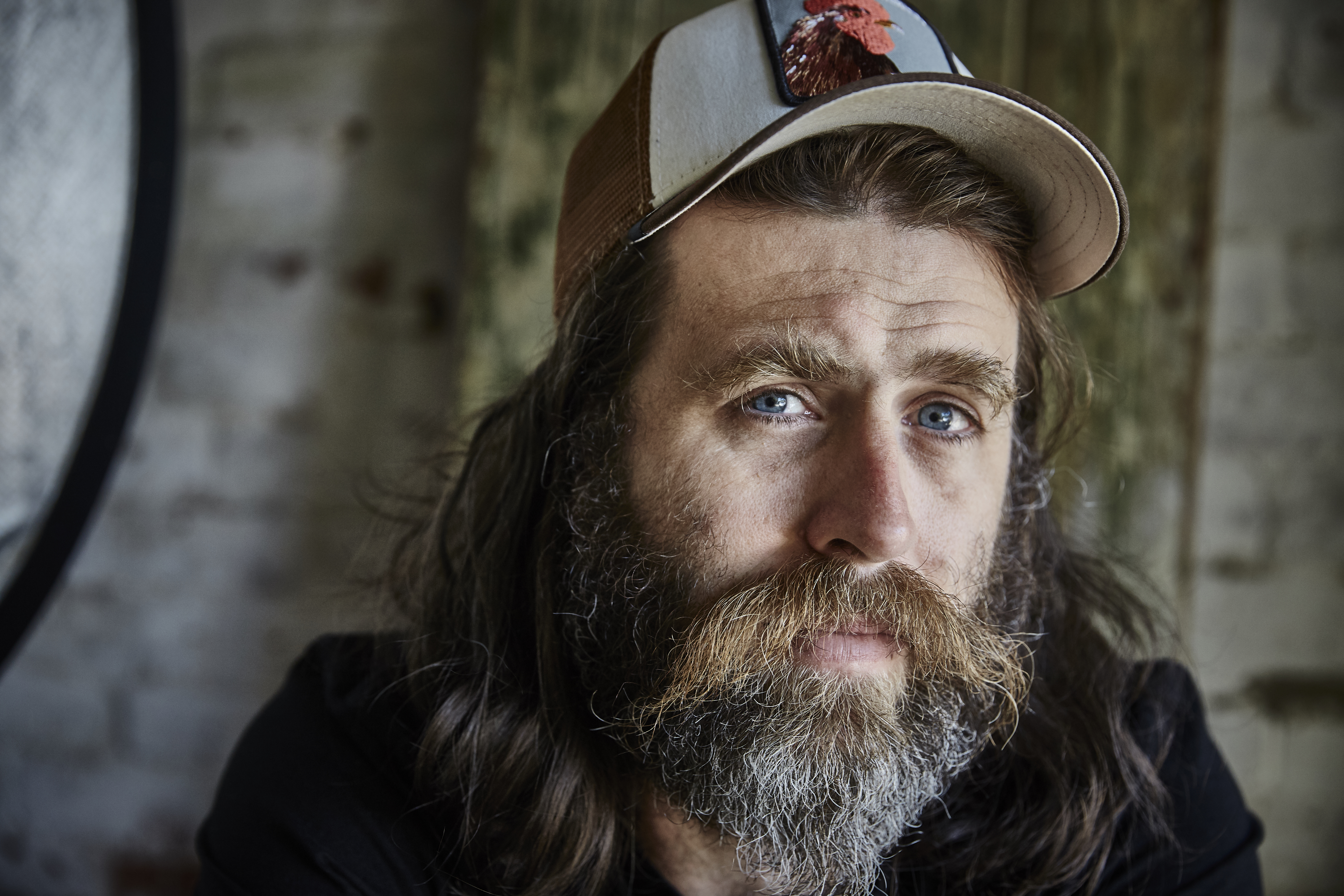

Background information
- Born: Craig Johnston; Hobart, Tasmania
- Genres: Contemporary, AC, Country
- Occupation: Artist/producer
- Years active: 2005–present
- Labels: Green Media, Rocket

Delsinki, stylised as DELSINKI aka Craig Johnston is a Melbourne-based musician. Born in Hobart, Tasmania, Delsinki moved to Melbourne in 1999. He formed the band Gretchen Lewis in 2005; the band recorded their debut album with Lindsay Gravina at Birdland studios and released it independently in 2010. Since 2012 he has operated as solo artist, executive producer and participant of the 'Keep the Circle Unbroken' and 'Sing a Song of Sixpence' touring shows. He has released two albums And There Was Found, No Place For Them and City / Country, the latter debuting at #3 in the ARIA Country Albums chart. Forte Magazine describe Delsinki as 'a type of folk sound that is true to the Australian bush landscape'.

In 2012 Delsinki participated in the Australian Chamber Orchestra production The Reef along with Stephen Pigram, Mark Atkins, Brian Ritchie, Jim Moginie, and other guests. The 2022 KTCU and Sixpence touring shows have featured Mick Thomas, Debra Byrne, Tim Rogers of You am I, Abby Dobson, Kylie Auldist of the Bamboos, and Tania Doko of Bachelor Girl. As of March 2022, about 36 shows (both KTCU & Sixpence combined for this number) have been staged including two appearances at the 2022 Port Fairy Folk Festival.

In March 2022 Delsinki became a semi finalist in the International Songwriting Competition. This is his fourth semi-final nomination for this award.
