= Good in the Face of a Stranger =

Studio album by Alex Lloyd
- Released: 1 November 2008
- Recorded: Home studio in London, 2008
- Genre: Pop rock Alternative rock
- Label: Inertia

Alex Lloyd chronology
Amazing: The Best of Alex Lloyd (2006)	Good in the Face of a Stranger (2008)	Rare Tracks & B-Sides (2011)

Singles from Good in the Face of a Stranger
- 1. "Slow Train" Released: August 2008; 2. "What We Started" Released: March 2009

Good in the Face of a Stranger is the fifth studio album by Australian rock musician Alex Lloyd, released through Inertia on 1 November 2008.

The album is Lloyd's first to be released independently, which is said to have given him more freedom, taking away the pressures of labels and giving him the chance to create a sound more like his debut release, Black the Sun.

The online order of the album through JB Hi-Fi came signed by Alex Lloyd, with three bonus postcards.

== Singles ==
The album spawned two singles. "Slow Train" was released as the album's first single in 2008, with it being available for free from Lloyd's official website. The song's music video was animated with 7,000 hand drawn pictures.

Similarly, "What We Started", the second single released in 2009, was also made available for free as a limited-time download via the Nova 100 website.

== Critical reception ==
Professional ratings
Review scores
Source	Rating
The Dwarf	(Positive)
The Cairns Post	4/5 stars
Faster Louder	(Positive)
The Independent Weekly	(Positive)
Tsunami Mag	4/10 stars

The album received positive reviews upon release, with a number of reviewers likening both the sound and quality of the LP to that of his debut album, Black the Sun;

In all, Lloyd’s fifth album, Good in the Face of a Stranger is an about face and makes a solid impression on the listener. At times it feels like it harks back to the early days and glory of Black The Sun, but there is also a maturity and occasional bursts of positivity, which distinguish this record. Lloyd has moved on (and rightly so) but thankfully he has not forgotten his roots.

Faster Louder attributed the album's similarities to his earlier work on his decision to relocate to England, claiming that the "change of scenery has enabled Lloyd to get into the same creative head space last seen on his debut album" resulting in "a pleasant pop record containing some of his best songs in years". Alexandra Nowak of The Independent Weekly also took a positive view, stating that "Good in the Face of a Stranger ultimately provides beautiful melodic lines with a mix of refined and delicate vocals that presents a basic yet artistically original album".

However, not all reviews were unanimously positive, as Tsunami Mag gave an opposing point of view, noting that by "sticking to his original guns and playing it safe (he) has produced what tends to be a mediocre comeback".

== Track listing ==
No.	Title	Length
1.	"Intro"	0:12
2.	"Special"	3:50
3.	"Slow Train"	4:22
4.	"Something for Nothing"	3:52
5.	"Lonely Town"	4:18
6.	"Last Drinks"	1:08
7.	"Face of a Stranger"	4:33
8.	"Drugs and Love"	3:26
9.	"Hollywood"	4:16
10.	"Same Day"	4:08
11.	"What We Started"	3:42
12.	"Last Bell"	5:29

== Charts ==
Chart performance for Good in the Face of a Stranger
Chart (2008)	Peak position
Australian Albums (ARIA)	80

== Release history ==
Country	Date	Label	Format	Catalogue #
Australia	4 November 2008	Inertia	CD, MP3, limited edition digipak	#LPTAB0001
