= Rocky McKenzie =

Aboriginal Australian chef and actor

- Born: Phillip McKenzie; Broome, Western Australia, Australia
- Occupation: Actor
- Years active: 2009–2010

Phillip "Rocky" McKenzie is an Aboriginal Australian chef and actor from Broome, Western Australia. He played Willie in the film version of Bran Nue Dae. In 2010, he won a Deadly Award for Male Actor of the Year.

In 2015, he became an apprentice chef.

== Career ==
In 2009, McKenzie played the role of the character of Willie in the Australian musical comedy-drama film Bran Nue Dae alongside Jessica Mauboy, Ernie Dingo, Missy Higgins, Geoffrey Rush, Deborah Mailman, Tom Budge, Magda Szubanski, Ningali Lawford, and Dan Sultan.

== Filmography ==
Year	Title	Role	Notes
2009	Bran Nue Dae	Wille	
2010	The Story of Bran Nue Dae	Himself	TV short documentary
2010	The Project	Himself	
