= Distant Light (Alex Lloyd album) =

Studio album by Alex Lloyd
- Released: September 2003
- Genre: Rock
- Label: EMI
- Producer: Stuart Miller

Alex Lloyd chronology
Watching Angels Mend (2001)	Distant Light (2003)	Alex Lloyd (2005)

Singles from Distant Light
- 1. "Coming Home" Released: August 2003; 2. "1000 Miles" Released: November 2003; 3. "Beautiful" Released: April 2004; 4. "Hello the End" Released: 2004

Distant Light is the third studio album by Australian singer-songwriter Alex Lloyd. It was released in September 2003, and peaked at number 9 on the ARIA Charts and it was certified gold.

At the ARIA Music Awards of 2004, the album was nominated for two awards.

== Background and released ==
On the Chaos Music website, Lloyd states that the album is based on homesickness after a long stretch on the road promoting his second album Watching Angels Mend. "That was the headspace of where I was at the time. We went to a lot of strange places, maybe places I don’t want to revisit. It was a pretty lonely time. I think I’d reached a point where I’d just travelled too much."

Distant Light features Jim Moginie and Martin Rotsey of Midnight Oil on several tracks. It was produced by Stuart Miller, who had also produced Watching Angels Mend and mixed by Tony Hoffer who has worked with Air, Beck and Turin Brakes.

== Track listing ==
1. "Hello the End" – 3:53
2. "Distant Light" – 4:02
3. "Coming Home" – 3:06
4. "Far Away" – 4:20
5. "1000 Miles" – 3:02
6. "Save My Soul" – 3:56
7. "Ordinary Boy" – 4:12
8. "Beautiful" – 3:22
9. "This Is a Call" – 4:07
10. "Chasing The Sun" – 2:55
11. "Light Is On" – 3:45
12. "What's Wrong" – 3:49
13. "America" – 3:33

== Charts ==
Chart (2003)	Peak position
Australian Albums (ARIA)	9

== Personnel ==
- Michael Barker – percussion, drums
- Andrew Bickers – horn
- Felix Bloxom – percussion, drums
- Brent Clark – engineer
- Sam Dixon – bass
- George Ellis Choir – chorus
- Georgia Ellis – string copyist
- Brian "Big Bass" Gardener – mastering
- Barbara Griffin – keyboards, backing vocals
- Stuart Hunter – keyboards, horn arrangements
- Alex Hewitson – double bass
- Tony Hoffer – mixing
- Kinnon Holt – guitar
- Andrew Bickers – saxophone
- Anthony Kable – trombone
- Stewart Kirwan – trumpet
- Alex Lloyd – bass, guitar, keyboards, vocals, producer, horn arrangements, string arrangements
- Stuart Miller – producer
- Jim Moginie – guitar, keyboards
- Simon Moor – A&R
- Kim Moyes – vibraphone
- Shane Nicholson – guitar, backing vocals
- John O'Donnell – A&R
- Benny Quinn – creative director
- Terepai Richmond – percussion, drums
- Michel Rose – pedal steel
- Martin Rotsey – guitar
- Luke Steele – guitar
- Simon Weller – photography
