= Catherine Ellis (ethnomusicologist) =

Australian ethnomusicologist (1935–1996)

Catherine Ellis AM FAHA
- Born: Catherine Joan Caughie; 19 May 1935; Birregurra, Victoria, Australia
- Died: 30 May 1996 (aged 61); Adelaide, South Australia

Academic background
- Education: University of Melbourne
- Alma mater: University of Glasgow
- Thesis: A Study of Central Australian Music (1961)

Catherine Joan Ellis AM FAHA (née Caughie; 1935–1996) was an Australian ethnomusicologist. She co-founded the Centre for Aboriginal Studies in Music (CASM) at the University of Adelaide in 1972.

== Early life and education ==
Catherine Joan Caughie was born on 19 May 1935 at Birregurra in Victoria.

At the end of her secondary schooling, Ellis won a Commonwealth Scholarship in 1953. She graduated from the University of Melbourne where she was resident at Ormond College, in 1956 with a Bachelor of Music. She completed a PhD in 1961 at the University of Glasgow, with her thesis "A Study of Central Australian Music", published in book form in 1964.

== Career ==
Ellis began her career researching Aboriginal music as assistant to Professor Ted Strehlow at the University of Adelaide from 1957 to 1958. She based her PhD on her analysis of Strehlow's collected material. On returning to Adelaide in 1962 she resumed her research assistant position but soon won a Postdoctoral Fellowship in the Department of Australian Linguistics. Next she received an ARC Research Fellowship to the Elder Conservatorium of Music.

With Ngarrindjeri poet, Leila Rankine (1932–1993), she established the Centre for Aboriginal Studies in Music at the University of Adelaide in 1972.

Throughout her career she made field trips in South Australia and along the Murray River to study and record Aboriginal music.

In 1985 Ellis was the first professor of music appointed by the University of New England in Armidale, New South Wales. She took the opportunity to share her vision for "integrated music education" in Australia.

== Other roles ==
Ellis served on the Council of the International Society for Ethnomusicology from 1968 to 1971, the first Australian to be elected.

She served as president of the Musicological Society of Australia from 1988 to 1989.

== Death and legacy ==
Ellis died on 30 May 1996 in Adelaide. She was survived by her husband, Max Ellis, three children and their families.

Her research papers, correspondence and unpublished manuscripts are held in the National Library of Australia.

== Honours and recognition ==
Ellis was made a Member of the Order of Australia in the 1991 Australia Day Honours for "service to music education and ethnomusicology, particularly Aboriginal music". She received an Honorary Doctorate of Letters from the University of New England in 1995 and was elected a Fellow of the Australian Academy of the Humanities not long before her death.

== Selected works ==
=== Books ===
- Ellis, Catherine J. (1964), Aboriginal Music Making: A study of Central Australian Music, Libraries Board of South Australia
- Ellis, Catherine J. (1985), Aboriginal Music, Education for Living: Cross-cultural experiences from South Australia, University of Queensland Press (published 1983), ISBN 978-0-7022-1992-4

=== Journal articles ===
- Ellis, Catherine J. (June 1969). "Structure and significance in Aboriginal song". Mankind. 7. Anthropological Society of New South Wales: 3–14.
- Ellis, Catherine J (October 1969). "Aboriginal Music and the Specialist Music Teacher". Australian Journal of Music Education (5): 19–24. ISSN 0004-9484.
- Ellis, Catherine J. (November 1984). "The Nature of Australian Aboriginal Music". International Journal of Music Education. os-4 (1): 47–50. doi:10.1177/025576148400400110. ISSN 0255-7614. S2CID 144179812.
