= Bobtales =

- Directed by: Todd Williams
- Presented by: Stephen (Baamba) Albert
- Narrated by: Stephen (Baamba) Albert; Jodi Hoffmann; Carol Petterson; Lynette Narkle; Vanessa Elliot
- Composer: David Milroy
- Country of origin: Australia
- Original language: English
- No. of episodes: 13

Production
- Producer: Patricia Evans

Original release
- Release: 29 June – 21 September 1998

Bobtales is an Australian animated series of aboriginal dreamtime stories produced in Perth, Western Australia in 1997 and aired in 1998.

Thirteen 5-minute episodes were produced by independent film company Gripping Film and Graphics and the Western Australian Aboriginal Media Association in Western Australia, with funding from Screenwest, Film Australia, and SBS Independent. The series is distributed within Australia and world wide by Screen Australia.

== Episodes ==
1. Waitj and the Djindong
2. The Trials of Yorna
3. Younger and Maak (Kangaroo and Moon)
4. Legend of the Southern Cross
5. How the Parrots got their Colours
6. Three Springs
7. How the Echidna Got its Quills
8. The Emu, Brolga and Eagle
9. The Kingfisher Tribe
10. The Dove and the Mountain Devil
11. Moon Stories
12. Legend of the Kwilena
13. How the Numbat Got Its Stripes / How the Chuditch Has Spots and the Emu Can't Fly
