= Alex Lloyd (album) =

Studio album by Alex Lloyd
- Released: 9 October 2005
- Recorded: London Bridge Studios, Seattle and Ocean Way Studios, Hollywood (dates unknown)
- Genre: Rock
- Length: 43:49
- Label: Epic
- Producer: Rick Parashar

Alex Lloyd chronology
Distant Light (2003)	Alex Lloyd (2005)	Amazing: The Best of Alex Lloyd (2006)

Singles from Alex Lloyd
- 1. "Never Meant to Fail" Released: 12 August 2005; 2. "The Wonder" Released: 30 September 2005; 3. "Brand New Day" Released: 8 April 2006

Alex Lloyd is the fourth studio album by Alex Lloyd, released in October 2005 (see 2005 in music). The album peaked at number 7 on the ARIA Charts. The album was recorded in London Bridge Studios, Seattle, with famed producer Rick Parashar.

== Track listing ==
All tracks written by Alex Lloyd (credited as A. Wasiliev)

1. "Brand New Day" – 4:08
2. "Outside" – 3:31
3. "Never Meant to Fail" – 3:48
4. "All You Need" – 3:03
5. "Still Waiting" – 3:26
6. "Sometimes" – 4:18
7. "The Wonder" – 4:14
8. "Holding On" – 3:44
9. "I Wish" – 3:18
10. "Follow" – 3:16
11. "Stand Down" – 3:27
12. "Speeding Cars" – 3:36

== Charts ==
Chart (2005/06)	Peak position
Australian Albums (ARIA)	7

== Certification ==
Region	Certification	Certified units/sales
Australia (ARIA)	Platinum	70,000^{^}
^{^} Shipments figures based on certification alone.
