= Alan Pigram =

Australian musician and songwriter

Alan Pigram is an Australian musician and songwriter. He has been a member of Scrap Metal and The Pigram Brothers.

== Career ==
Along with his brothers Stephen and Phillip, Pigram was a founding member of Scrap Metal. Together they toured nationally and released four albums before breaking up in 1995.

Alan, Steven and Phillip then joined up with their brothers David, Colin, Gavin and Peter to form The Pigram Brothers. They released several albums.

In 2011 Pigram worked with Alex Lloyd and Stephen Pigram on the soundtrack of Mad Bastards, a film he co-produced with Brendan Fletcher, David Jowsey, and Stephen Pigram.

As of 2016 Pigram runs a Pearl Shell Studio, a recording studio in Broome.

== Recognition and awards ==
In 2006, along with Stephen, he was inducted into the Western Australian Music Hall of Fame.

Award nominations for Mad Bastards (2012):

- Winner, Inside Film Awards, Independent Spirit Award, (with Fletcher, Jowsey and Stephen Pigram)
- Nominated for two AFI Award: AFI Members' Choice Award and Best Film (both with Fletcher, Jowsey and Stephen)
- Nominated, APRA Music Award for Feature Film Score of the Year (with Fletcher and Stephen)
- Nominated ARIA Music Award for Best Original Soundtrack, Cast or Show Album (with Lloyd and Stephen)

They were nominated for an ARIA Music Award in 2012 for Best World Music Album.

== Personal life ==
Pigram was married to Josie Pigram, who died in 2011.

== Awards and nominations ==
=== ARIA Music Awards ===
The ARIA Music Awards is an annual awards ceremony held by the Australian Recording Industry Association. They commenced in 1987.

Year	Nominee / work	Award	Result	Ref.
2011	Mad Bastards (as The Pigram Brothers with Alex Lloyd)	Best Original Soundtrack, Cast or Show Album	Nominated	
