= Nokturnl =

- Origin: Alice Springs, Northern Territory, Australia
- Genres: Rap metal
- Years active: 1996–2005
- Labels: Sputnik, Shock
- Members: Craig Tilmouth : Singer, guitar, drums, bass guitar Damien Armstrong : Lead guitar, bass guitar, vocals
- Past members: Sorbz : Bass guitar Paul Kelly : Drums; Nick Guggisberg : Drums; Martin Lee : Drums; Michael Barker : Drums; Douglas Pipe : Drums; Jamie Ramzan : Bass guitar Brendon Lundstrom : Bass guitar Cameron McGlinchey : Drums; Matt Cornell : Bass guitar
- Website: http://www.nokturnl.com (2003 archive)

Nokturnl is a band formed in 1996 in Alice Springs, Northern Territory, Australia. Sometimes called rap metal; their music is hard to categorise, but their lyrics are influenced by their experience as Indigenous Australians. Nokturnl won "Band of the Year" at The Deadlys in 1998, 2000 and 2003.

They signed with Festival Mushroom offshoot Sputnik Records in December 1999. Their first release, "Neva Mend", was nominated for the ARIA Awards for Best Alternative Release and Best Video.

They have toured in Europe and in Brazil. They toured Australia with Spiderbait, and have supported Powderfinger and Regurgitator, they have recorded with Spiderbait, Machine Gun Fellatio and Primary, and have performed at the Survival Festival Concert (1998) and Big Day Out (2000). On 3 July 2000 they performed a live set for TripleJ's Live at the Wireless. Channel V aired an hour-long documentary on 16 October 2000 featuring live footage shot on 28 July 2000 at a show with Midnight Oil in Alice Springs.

Their music has been featured in the films Radiance, Yolngu Boy and Saturday Night, Sunday Morning.

== Discography ==
=== Studio albums ===
List of studio albums, with Australian chart positions
Title	Album details	Peak chart positions
Title	Album details	AUS
Time Flies	Released: July 2003; Label: Festival Mushroom Records (336422); Formats: CD	-

=== Extended Plays ===
List of EPs, with Australian chart positions
Title	Album details	Peak chart positions
Title	Album details	AUS
Unveiled	Released: October 2000; Label: Sputnik Records (MUSH019742); Formats: CD	-

=== Singles ===
List of singles
Title	Year
"Neva Mend"	2000
"Haterz"	2001

== Awards and nominations ==
=== ARIA Music Awards ===
The ARIA Music Awards is an annual awards ceremony that recognises excellence, innovation, and achievement across all genres of Australian music. They commenced in 1987.

Year	Nominee / work	Award	Result	Ref.
2000	"Neva Mend"	Best Alternative Release	Nominated	
2000	Bart Borghese – Nokturnl – "Neva Mend"	Best Video	Nominated	

=== Deadly Awards ===
The Deadly Awards, (commonly known simply as The Deadlys), was an annual celebration of Australian Aboriginal and Torres Strait Islander achievement in music, sport, entertainment and community. They ran from 1996 to 2013.

Year	Nominee / work	Award	Result (wins only)	Ref.
1998	NoKTuRNL	Band of The Year	Won	
2000	NoKTuRNL	Band of The Year	Won	
2003	NoKTuRNL	Band of The Year	Won	
