= Black Swan State Theatre Company =

Theatre company in Perth, Western Australia

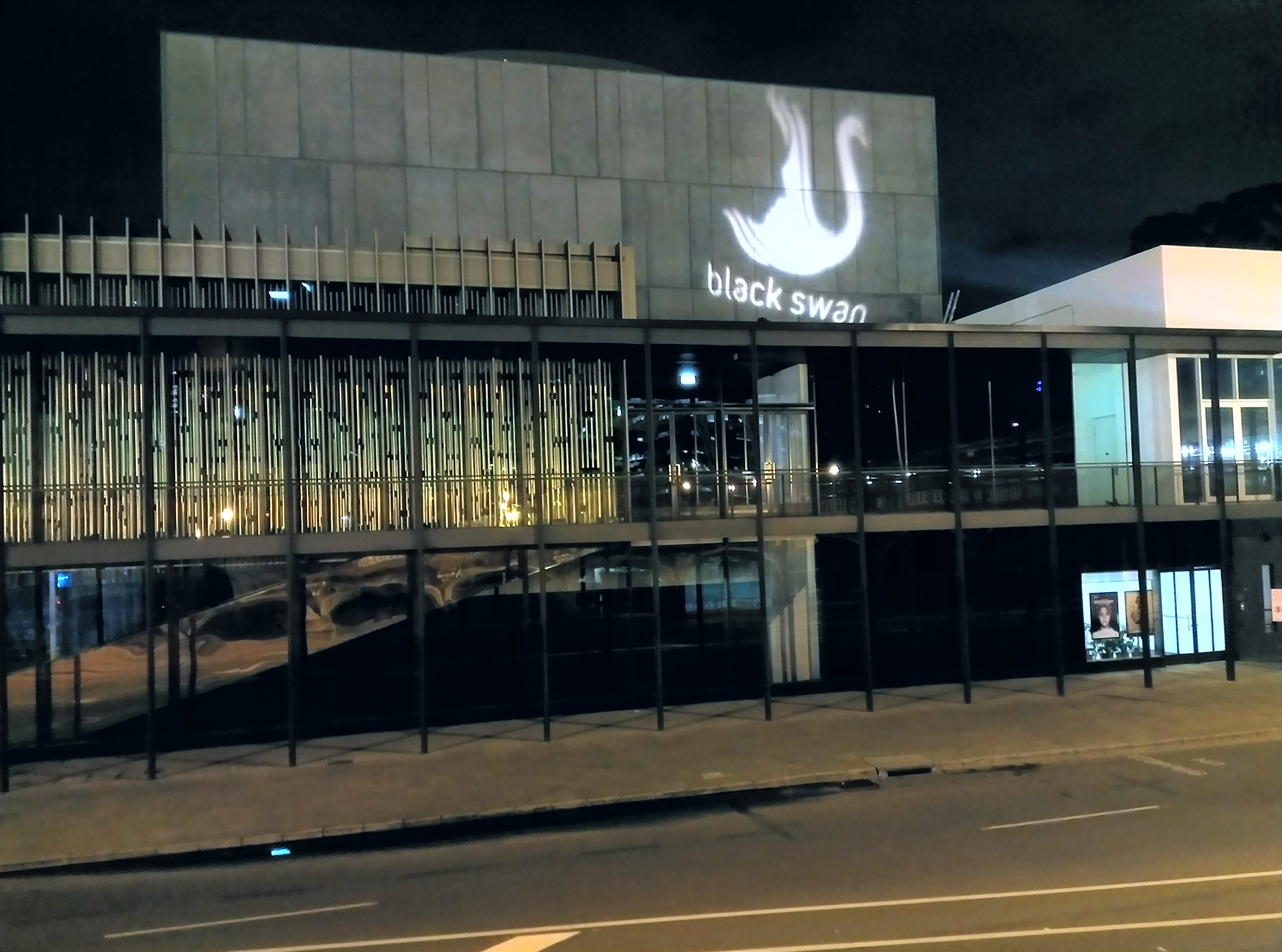
- Address: State Theatre Centre of WA, Level 1, 182 William Street; Perth, Western Australia; Australia
- Production: A Streetcar Named Desire; As You Like It; Dust; The Seagull; Laughter on the 23rd Floor; Gasp!; Flood; The House on the Lake

Website
- http://www.blackswantheatre.com.au/

Black Swan State Theatre Company, formerly known as the Black Swan Theatre Company, is Western Australia's state theatre company. It runs an annual subscription season in Perth at the State Theatre Centre of Western Australia, tours its productions regionally and interstate, and screens live broadcasts around the state. Past artistic directors include Kate Cherry, Andrew Ross, and Tom Gutteridge. In 2022 Kate Champion was announced as the company's director.

== History ==
Black Swan's inaugural production was Twelfth Night in 1991. The Australian’s Alison Farmer claimed that the new company "soared triumphant", and that "at last West Australian theatre can be said to have found its own unique way of dealing with the Bard".

Black Swan's founding artistic director was Andrew Ross; he held the position until 2003. Black Swan's office and rehearsal room was located at the Old Masonic Hall in Nedlands, and its productions were performed in various theatres around Perth. Some of its productions from this period include Bran Nue Dae, Sistergirl, Tourmaline, Corrugation Road (winner of The Age Critics' Award), The Merry-Go-Round in the Sea, Cloudstreet and The Odyssey.

Following Ross' departure in 2003, Peter Kingston was engaged as Black Swan's acting artistic director until the appointment of Tom Gutteridge in 2004.

In 2008, Black Swan was rebranded Black Swan State Theatre Company, an event which coincided with the appointment of Kate Cherry as the company's Artistic Director.

In 2011, Black Swan became a Resident Company in the new State Theatre Centre of WA, performing in the Heath Ledger Theatre or the Studio Underground. In its first year at the State Theatre Centre, Black Swan presented the world premiere of Rising Water, the first piece written by Western Australian novelist Tim Winton specifically for the stage. In the same year, Black Swan was the first Australian theatre company to broadcast a live stage performance, when Shakespeare's A Midsummer Night's Dream, directed by Kate Cherry, was broadcast in real time to audiences across regional Western Australia.

In 2017, Clare Watson took over as the company's new artistic director. In 2022, Kate Champion was announced as the company's artistic director.

== Commissions, programs and past ensembles ==
=== Rio Tinto Black Swan Commissions ===
Black Swan commissions new productions in partnership with the Rio Tinto Group. This partnership has so far produced four mainstage works: Aidan Fennessy's National Interest (2012), Hilary Bell's The White Divers of Broome (2012), Hannie Rayson's The Swimming Club (2010), and Kate Mulvany's The Web (2009). A fifth play, The Damned (2011) by Reg Cribb, received its premiere in the Studio Underground at the State Theatre Centre of WA.

=== Professional development programs ===
==== The HotBed Ensemble (2006–2010) ====
The HotBed Ensemble was Black Swan's professional development program for emerging Western Australian artists directed by Adam Mitchell. The program included skills development and workshop opportunities with local, national and international artists, and the opportunity to create original, contemporary work. More than a third of the HotBed artists went on to work in Black Swan's mainstage program.

The HotBed Ensemble produced The Shape of Things (2010), Yellow Moon: The Ballad of Leila and Lee (2010), The Dark Room (2009), pool [no water] (2009), Caucasian Chalk Circle (2008), Portraits of Modern Evil (2008), The Laramie Project (2007), Falling Petals (2006) and Woyzeck (2006). The Shape of Things, Yellow Moon and Caucasian Chalk Circle all received Equity Guild nominations; Caucasian Chalk Circle won two Equity Guild Awards (Best Director and Best Newcomer), and The Shape of Things won five (Best Production, Best Director, Best Actress and Best Design).

In 2011, the HotBed Ensemble was replaced by the Emerging Artists Program (now the Resident Artists Program).

==== Resident Artists Program ====
Black Swan's Resident Artists Program (formerly the Emerging Artists Program) supports up to five emerging artists annually by offering a year-long involvement working on a minimum of two Black Swan productions. The Resident Artists Program provides access to training, funding opportunities, mentoring and theatre practice in order to facilitate learning and performance.

==== Emerging Writers Group ====
Black Swan's Emerging Writers Group (formerly the Young Writers Program) supports a group of writers through a yearlong process of writing and devising a new work for the theatre. Three completed plays are chosen for full readings by a professional cast; in addition, one play is selected to be part of the Blue Room's ‘Summer Nights’ season the following year.

== Awards and nominations ==
Year	Award	Production	Nominee	Result
2013	Equity Guild Award for Best Actor	Arcadia	Scott Sheridan	–
2013	Equity Guild Award for Best Actress	Arcadia	Whitney Richards	–
2013	Equity Guild Award for Best Supporting Actor	Arcadia	Nick Maclaine	–
2013	Equity Guild Award for Best Supporting Actress	Arcadia	Adriane Daff	–
2013	Equity Guild Award for Best Supporting Actress	Cat on a Hot Tin Roof	Caitlin Beresford-Ord	Won
2013	Equity Guild Award for Best New Play	The Damned	Reg Cribb	–
2013	Equity Guild Award for Best Supporting Actor	The Damned	Greg McNeill	–
2013	Equity Guild Award for Best Supporting Actress	The Damned	Polly Low	–
2013	Equity Guild Award for Best Production	When The Rain Stops Falling	When The Rain Stops Falling	–
2013	Equity Guild Award for Best Director	When The Rain Stops Falling	Adam Mitchell	Won
2013	Equity Guild Award for Best Actor	When The Rain Stops Falling	Steve Turner	–
2013	Equity Guild Award for Best Actress	When The Rain Stops Falling	Julia Moody	–
2013	Equity Guild Award for Best Actress	When The Rain Stops Falling	Alison van Reeken	–
2013	Equity Guild Award for Best Design	When The Rain Stops Falling	Bryan Woltjen	–
2013	Equity Guild Award for Best Design	The White Divers of Broome	Bruce McKinven	–
2013	Equity Guild Award for Best Design	The White Divers of Broome	Trent Suidgeest	–
2017	Matilda Awards, Best Supporting Female Actor & Billie Brown Award for Best Emerging Artist	Moliere's Tartuffe	Emily Weir	Won
2017	Green Room Awards	Picnic at Hanging Rock a co-production with Malthouse Theatre	Ash Gibson Greig (Composition) J. David Franzke (Sound Design)	Won
2017	PAWA, Best Supporting Actor (Female)	Let the Right One In	Alison van Reeken	Won
2017	PAWA, Best Music	Let the Right One In	Rachael Dease, Composition & Sound Design	Won
2017	PAWA, Best Actor (Male)	The Eisteddfod	Brendan Ewing	Won
2017	PAWA, Best Director	The Eisteddfod	Jeffrey Jay Fowler	Won
2017	PAWA, Best Mainstage Production	The Eisteddfod		Won
2017	PAWA, Best New Work	Coma Land a co-production with Performing Lines	Will O'Mahony	Won
