= Watching Angels Mend =

Studio album by Alex Lloyd
- Released: September 2001
- Recorded: The Town House; Rockfield Studios; Dub Shack; Canelot
- Genre: Pop rock
- Label: EMI
- Producer: Magnus Fiennes; Steve Osbourne

Alex Lloyd chronology
Black The Sun (1999)	Watching Angels Mend (2001)	Distant Light (2003)

Singles from Watching Angels Mend
- 1. "Downtown" Released: 9 July 2001; 2. "Amazing" Released: 17 September 2001; 3. "Green" Released: 18 February 2002; 4. "Everybody's Laughing" Released: June 2002; 5. "Bus Ride" Released: 2002

Watching Angels Mend is the second studio album by Alex Lloyd. It was released on 17 September 2001 by EMI Records.

At the ARIA Music Awards of 2002, Lloyd was nominated for seven awards, and won Best Male Artist.

== Reception ==
Professional ratings
Review scores
Source	Rating
AllMusic	3/5 stars
Q	4/5 stars

Daniel Werner from CMJ called the album "one of Australia's biggest homegrown albums of 2002" and "a serious contender for record of the year".

== Track listing ==
All tracks are written by A. Wasiliev, except where noted.

No.	Title	Writer(s)	Length
1.	"Everybody's Laughing"		3:50
2.	"Green"		4:02
3.	"Trigger"		5:05
4.	"My Friend"		3:36
5.	"Lost in the Rain"		3:02
6.	"Sleep"		4:02
7.	"Amazing"		3:23
8.	"Downtown"		4:44
9.	"Bus Ride"	A. Wasiliev/S. Miller	4:31
10.	"Burn"		3:29
11.	"Easy Exit Station"		3:01

== Charts ==
=== Weekly charts ===
Chart (2001/02)	Peak position
Australian Albums (ARIA)	2
New Zealand Albums (RMNZ)	22

=== Year-end charts ===
Chart (2001)	Position
ARIA Albums Chart	31
Chart (2002)	Position
ARIA Albums Chart	37

== Certification ==
Region	Certification	Certified units/sales
Australia (ARIA)	3× Platinum	210,000^{^}
^{^} Shipments figures based on certification alone.

== Personnel ==
- Alex Lloyd - guitar, vocals, programming, keys, bass
- Magnus Fiennes - programming, keys, string arrangement
- BJ Cole - pedal steel guitar
- The Weatherman - programming, drums, percussion
- Ric Featherstone - Programming
- Brian Gascoigne - string conductor
- Tom Windriff - vocals, drums, percussion
- Sedsil Top - vocals
- Bernard Fanning - vocals
- Sharon Finn - vocals
- Lorna Marshall - vocals
- Dean Tidey - guitar
- Graham Kearns - guitar
- William South - piano, Hammond organ
- Jim Hayden - keys
- Guy Pratt - bass
- Shawn Lee - drums, percussion
- Clive Deamer - drums, percussion
- Ged Lynch - drums, percussion
