= Centre for Aboriginal Studies in Music =

Music study centre in Adelaide, Australia

The Centre for Aboriginal Studies in Music (CASM), originally founded as the Adelaide Aboriginal Orchestra in 1972, is an educational centre focused on Indigenous Australian music based at Adelaide University. As of June 2026, CASM is located within the Elder Conservatorium of Music and School of Performing Arts, which is within the College of Creative Arts, Design and Humanities at Adelaide University. Dylan Crismani is the program director.

== History ==
CASM was co-founded by Catherine Ellis, Australian ethnomusicologist, and noted Ngarrindjeri poet Leila Rankine (1932–1993). Then called the Adelaide Aboriginal Orchestra, it was an ad hoc co-curricular music program located in Port Adelaide, designed to provide activities for Aboriginal and Torres Strait Islander youth and to help keep them out of trouble. News of its post-high-school courses spread across the country, and students arrived from as far afield as the Top End, Tasmania, and the Torres Strait Islands.

Rankine was chairperson until her retirement in 1986.

CASM's early programs grew out of collaborations with the Anangu community at Iwantja. Aboriginal elders were granted the status of visiting lecturers. In 1975, the University of Adelaide formally recognised the program, and it was absorbed into the Elder Conservatorium of Music. In that year, Pitjantjatjara songman Minjunga Baker was appointed as a senior lecturer at the centre, which was ground-breaking at the time. The programs were, and continue to be, mostly led by Indigenous people.

In the 1980s, CASM students began to create their own music, resulting in the formation of groups including No Fixed Address, Us Mob, Coloured Stone, and Kuckles. Doug Petherick, a non-Indigenous man, began teaching guitar at CASM in 1988. Federal government funding helped to support trips to the Anangu Pitjantjatjara Yankunytjatjara (APY Lands), where elders taught the students Inma (cultural songs and dances); performances and collaborations with successful musicians, such as Warumpi Band; and also introduced Aboriginal juvenile offenders to CASM. During this period, CASM offered a three-year advanced diploma as well as one-year certificates.

However cuts to education in the 1990s meant that the aim of providing a degree-level course did not materialise, and CASM had to cut its program to a one-year foundation course, which qualified students to enter the Elder Conservatorium's other degrees.

In May 2015, a restructure of the Elder Conservatorium was announced, which included that CASM would be absorbed into the School of Humanities as part of a new Centre for Aboriginal Language and Music Studies. In November 2016, the National Centre for Aboriginal Language and Music Studies (NCALMS) was created, bringing together three units: CASM, Kaurna Warra Pintyanthi, and the Mobile Language Team.

From 14 March 2023 to 2 June 2023, the university's Barr Smith Library mounted an exhibition, Let Our Songs Speak for Us - Celebrating 50 years of the Centre of Aboriginal Studies in Music.

In early April 2023, Grayson Rotumah and Dylan Crismani were appointed joint leaders of CASM, providing Indigenous leadership for the first time in its history. Rotumah had been a lecturer at CASM for over 30 years, and Crismani is a composer of Wiradjuri descent. Rotumah came from the Gold Coast, Queensland, and passed an audition to enter the CASM course at the age of 28. Moving to Adelaide, he had been pleasantly surprised to find Aboriginal culture celebrated rather than discriminated against, as was his experience in the Gold Coast. He completed the three-year advanced diploma at CASM, and then undertook a contemporary music degree at a music school in Byron Bay.

In May 2023 it was announced that musicians from CASM would be playing at the 2023 Primavera Sound music festival in Barcelona, Spain, which runs from 29 May to 4 June. They were invited, along with the APY lands band DEM MOB, by Primavera Pro director Elena Barreras, after she had toured Adelaide as part of the promotion of Adelaide as a UNESCO City of Music.

In June 2026, Ngarrindjeri rapper, songwriter, and record producer Trials (aka Daniel Rankine) started mentoring students at CASM. He is the first Indigenous producer at CASM in 15 years. During the period of his appointment, he will continue to contribute to the Kaurna Songbook, along with community projects in prisons and other places.

== Structure and description ==
As of June 2026, CASM is located within the Elder Conservatorium, which is within the College of Creative Arts, Design and Humanities at Adelaide University. Dylan Crismani is the program director.

The centre offers music education for Aboriginal and Torres Strait Islander musicians, as well as being a major centre for the production of Australian Indigenous music. Wirltu Yarlu, the Aboriginal and Torres Strait Islander student support program, helps to support the students, and scholarships are available. There is a state-of-the-art dedicated recording studio, along with teaching and practice rooms, a dance room, a keyboard suite, and computer suites.

As of 2026 only a 12-month foundation course is offered, allowing musicians to enrol for a degree at the Elder Conservatorium afterwards. The course focuses on music performance, composition, and recording.

== Publications ==
CASM published a newsletter, Tjungaringanyi (later spelt Tjunguringanyi), meaning "all one people coming together", from 1972 to 1992, (Note: In 1991, the spelling of the title changed to Tjunguringanyi, after the convention relating to the transliteration of words in the Pitjantjatjara language tjungu rather than tjunga.) with publication suspended in 1984 and between 1986 and 1990. Co-founder Leila Rankine edited and contributed poems to the magazine from its inception until her retirement in 1986.

Yurikurringa Ngadluku Paltirna: Listen to Our Songs! is a book of songs in the Kaurna language written and compiled by many musicians in collaboration, published in 2025 by CASM and various partners.

== Notable alumni ==
=== Bands ===
- Coloured Stone
- Kuckles
- No Fixed Address
- Us Mob

=== Individuals ===
- Elaine Crombie
- Zaachariaha Fielding (of the duo Electric Fields)
- Joe Geia (of No Fixed Address)
- Ellie Lovegrove
- Nathan May (2012–2015)
- David Page
- Tilly Tjala Thomas (foundation year, 2021)
- Simi Vuata
- Bart Willoughby (of No Fixed Address)
