= The Pigram Brothers =

Australian musical group

- The Pigram Brothers

Background information
- Origin: Broome, Western Australia, Australia
- Years active: 1996–present
- Labels: Pigram Music; MGM Distribution
- Members: Alan Pigram; Stephen Pigram; David Pigram; Colin Pigram; Gavin Pigram; Phillip Pigram; Peter Pigram
- Past members: Paul Mamid
- Website: Pigram Brothers Home Page

The Pigram Brothers are a seven-piece Indigenous Australian band from the pearling town of Broome, Western Australia, formed in 1996.

They were heavily involved in Broome's musical and theatrical exports – forming the original backing band for Jimmy Chi's 1990 musical Bran Nue Dae, which received international acclaim.

The Pigram Brothers had a large music influence from an early age, and grew up in the rich musical culture of Broome. Alan, Steven and Phillip were members of Scrap Metal from 1983 until its separation in 1995.

In 2000 they were the subject of the one-hour documentary, Saltwater Country, part of ABC Television's Message Stick.

In 2006 Steven and Alan were inducted into the Western Australian Music Hall of Fame.

In 2011, Alan and Steven Pigram began touring with Alex Lloyd as part of the Mad Bastards Trio, performing music from the 2011 film, Mad Bastards. Their soundtrack was nominated for an ARIA Award for Best Original Soundtrack, Cast or Show Album at the 2011 ARIA Awards.

== Members ==
- Alan Pigram – guitar, mandolin, ukulele, tiple
- Stephen Pigram – vocals, acoustic guitar, harmonica, requinto, valiha, ukulele, dulcimer
- David Pigram – vocals, acoustic guitar
- Colin Pigram – vocals, acoustic guitar
- Philip Pigram – vocals, drums
- Peter Pigram – bass guitar
- Gavin Pigram – percussion

== Discography ==
=== Studio albums ===
Title	Details
Saltwater Country	Released: 1997; Label: Jigil Records (JR-CD004); Format: CD
Jiir	Released: 2001; Label: Pigram Music (PMCD001); Format: CD
Under The Mango Tree	Released: 2006; Label: Pigram Music (PMCD002); Format: CD

=== Soundtrack albums ===
Title	Details
Corrugation Road (with Jimmy Chi and Kuckles)	Released: 1997; Label: Angoorrabin (AR-8); Format: CD
The Circuit (David Bridie with The Pigram Brothers)	Released: 2007; Label: Sound Vault Records (SV0583); Format: CD
Mad Bastards (with Alex Lloyd, Kasey Chambers & Shane Nicholson)	Released: 2011; Label:Bush Turkey Films (BTF001); Format: CD

=== Live albums ===
Title	Details
Live at the Pearl Luggers, Broome	Released: 2004; Label: The Pigram Brothers (pmdvd0401); Format: DVD

== Awards and nominations ==
=== ARIA Music Awards ===
The ARIA Music Awards is an annual awards ceremony that recognises excellence, innovation, and achievement across all genres of Australian music.The Pigram Brothers have received two nominations.

Year	Nominee / work	Award	Result
2005	Under The Mango Tree	Best World Music Album	Nominated
2011	Mad Bastards - Music from the Motion Picture	Best Original Soundtrack, Cast or Show Album	Nominated

=== Deadly Awards ===
The Deadly Awards were an annual celebration of Australian Aboriginal and Torres Strait Islander achievement in music, sport, entertainment and community. They ran from 1995 to 2013.

Year	Nominee / work	Award	Result (wins only)
1998	Saltwater Country	Album Release of the Year	Won
1998	Corrugation Road (with Jimmy Chi and Kuckles)	Excellence in Film or Theatrical Score	Won
2006	Under the Mango Tree	Album Release of the Year	Won

=== West Australian Music Industry Awards ===
The West Australian Music Industry Awards are annual awards celebrating achievements for Western Australian music. They commenced in 1985.

Year	Nominee / work	Award	Result (wins only)
2005	The Pigram Brothers	Best Indigenous Act	Won
2006	The Pigram Brothers	Hall of Fame	inducted
2007	The Pigram Brothers	Best Indigenous Act	Won
2008	The Pigram Brothers	Best Indigenous Act	Won
