= Scrap Metal (band) =

Australian musical group

- Origin: Broome, Western Australia, Australia
- Genres: Rock, reggae, country
- Years active: 1983–1995
- Labels: Jigil/Larrikin, ABC/PolyGram
- Spinoffs: The Pigram Brothers
- Past members: Michael Ambi; Alan Pigram; Phillip Pigram; Stephen Pigram; Michael Teh; Johnny Albert; Duncan Campbell

Scrap Metal were a reggae, country, rock band from Broome, Western Australia which formed in 1983. The members had Aboriginal, Irish, Filipino, French, Chinese, Scottish, Indonesian and Japanese heritage. The group issued four albums, Just Looking (1987), Broken Down Man (1988), Scrap Metal (1990) and Pub Sweat 'n' Tears (1992). They toured nationally supporting Midnight Oil in 1987 and as part of the Bran Nue Dae musical in 1990 and 1993. They were the first Aboriginal band to sign an international publishing deal. Scrap Metal are the subject of an ABC TV documentary From Broome to the Big Smoke (1991). They won the Best Indigenous Act award at the 1992 West Australian Music Industry Awards. The group disbanded in 1995.

After Scrap Metal, founding mainstays Alan, Stephen and Phillip Pigram, joined their younger brothers David, Colin, Gavin and Peter to form the Pigram Brothers. In 2006 Stephen and Alan Pigram were inducted into the Western Australian Music Hall of Fame.

== History ==
Scrap Metal were formed as a reggae, country, rock band in 1983 in Broome by Michael Ambi on lead vocals, Alan Pigram on guitar, Phillip Pigram on drums, Stephen Pigram on vocals and guitar and Michael Teh on bass guitar. The two eldest Pigram brothers, Alan and Stephen, had performed together in bands since 1977 and Phillip joined for Scrap Metal. Broome had a history of ocean fishing and pearl diving, which attracted culturally diverse groups; the members had Aboriginal, Irish, Filipino, French, Chinese, Scottish, Indonesian and Japanese heritage. Besides local shows, the group would travel 220 km (140 mi) to Derby or 612 km (380 mi) to Port Hedland to perform. Due to the town's isolation, "[they] weren't reared on the traditional Aussie rock and roll ritual - that is, they didn't get their weekly dose of Sunday night Countdown to keep them abreast of music trends." Ambi drowned in 1985 and was replaced on vocals by Johnny Albert. Duncan Campbell, their talent manager, joined on keyboards.

Scrap Metal's debut album, Just Looking (1987), was recorded at Broome's Planet Studio in 1986. Self-financed, it was issued on music cassette. The group gained the attention of Midnight Oil's members, who asked them to join that group's Diesel and Dust Tour in October 1987. Scrap Metal funded their own label, Jigil, to issue their next album, Broken Down Man (October 1988), which was distributed by Larrikin. Kathryn Whitfield of The Canberra Times observed, "[it's] quite impressive in its diversity [with their] blend of rock, reggae, pop and country."

In 1989 the members signed with ABC Music/PolyGram, which released their third album, Scrap Metal (August 1990). Whitfield's colleague, Penelope Layland found it, "a wonderful fusion of simple rock, iced with country pop [where] the music and the lyrics are unpretentious and heartfelt." They became the first Aboriginal artists to sign a music publishing deal with Warner Chappell. Also in that year Alan, Phillip, Stephen and Campbell performed in Bran Nue Dae and reprised their work in the musical in 1993. From Broome to the Big Smoke (1991), an ABC TV documentary, dealt with the band's history and showcased their performances.

Pub Sweat 'n' Tears, their fourth album, was issued in May 1993. For the album Alan, Phillip and Stephen were joined by their brother David Pigram on backing vocals and Paul Mamid on bass guitar. One track, "Beautiful Woman", had been recorded in 1985 with Michael Ambi on lead vocals and Teh on bass guitar. The group disbanded in 1995 and subsequently Alan on lead guitar, mandolin, ukulele and tiple, Stephen on vocals, acoustic guitar, harmonica, requinto, valiha and ukulele, and Phillip vocals and drums, were joined their younger brothers David on vocals and acoustic guitar, Colin on vocals and acoustic guitar, Gavin on percussion and Peter on vocals and bass guitar, to form the Pigram Brothers in the following year. In 2006 Alan and Stephen Pigram were inducted into the Western Australian Music Hall of Fame.

== Members ==
- Michael Ambi – lead vocals (1983–1985, died 1985)
- Alan Pigram – guitar
- Phillip Pigram – drums
- Stephen Pigram – vocals, guitar
- Michael Teh – bass guitar
- Johnny Albert – lead vocals
- Duncan Campbell – keyboards
- Paul Mamid – bass guitar

== Discography ==
=== Albums ===
- Just Looking (1987) – Independent
- Broken Down Man (October 1988) – Jigil/Larrikin (AJLP 1051)
- Scrap Metal (August 1990) – ABC Music
- Pub Sweat 'n' Tears (May 1993) – Jigil (SMJ001)

=== Singles ===
- "Somewhere in the Distance / Magdalene" (1988)
- "Broken Down Man" / "Caught in the Wheel" (1988)
- "Nimunburr" / "In the Night" (1989)
- "Make It Work" (1990)
- "Howling at the Moon" (1991)
