= Mark Bin Bakar =

Australian comedian

- Other name: Mary G "The Black Queen of the Kimberley".
- Spouse: Married (2 children)
- Website: Mary G's Home Page

Mark Bin Bakar is an Indigenous Australian musician, comedian and radio announcer, writer, director/producer as well as an indigenous rights campaigner based in Broome, in the Kimberley region of Western Australia. He is best known for his radio and television character, the acid-tongued Mary Geddarrdyu or Mary G, who has gained a national following and has been described as a Dame Edna Everage in thongs. In character Mary G has hosted a radio program as well as a variety show broadcast nationally on SBS Television.

In 2022 he was appointed to the Western Australian Aboriginal Cultural Heritage Council.

== Career ==
=== Mary G ===
The son of a Catholic Indigenous mother and a Malay Muslim father from Singapore, Bakar created the character Mary G as a Stolen Generations woman like his mother. She first featured on Bin Bakar's radio show in Broome at Radio Goolarri in 1993 where she tackled issues of domestic violence, sexual health and reconciliation, and was particularly popular with Aboriginal women.

The Mary G show has played at the Sydney Opera House and at festivals and conferences right around Australia. The Mary G show has also travelled to rural and remote communities across the country, including an extensive tour across Western Australia.

Bakar continues to present the Mary G radio show for three hours every Wednesday night; it is broadcast to over 100 radio stations via the National Indigenous Radio Service (NIRS). He also tours across the country with his live cabaret show. He is able to combine these two activities only because he carries a portable radio studio whenever he leaves his home base in Broome.

=== Music ===
Bakar was the founder of Stompen Ground, a musical event that was held in Broome and televised nationally. Mary G won a Deadly Award in 2005 for Excellence in Film or Theatrical Score.

Bakar is a musician who performed in Western Australian Indigenous bands including Section 54 and Footprince. Twenty years ago, Bakar established Ab Music in Perth and its subsidiary the Aboriginal and Islander College of Music.

== Activism ==
Bakar has also been actively involved in seeking justice for members of the Stolen Generations; part of this involvement has been through chairing the Kimberley Stolen Generations Corporation. He has also produced two albums of songs about the Stolen Generations. Bakar was also an inaugural deputy convenor of the 'Stolen Generations Alliance' formed in 2006.

On 11 July 2007, he did a three-hour show with The Pigram Brothers, also from Broome, and other musicians in the Berrimah Jail, Darwin. This was broadcast live over the NIRS Network; this concert broadcast is without precedent, being the first national broadcast of a 'jail concert'. In 2009 he appeared at the one movement concert for aboriginal reconciliation.

Bakar gave a number of keynote addresses in 2006 and 2007, including a speech given in the Great Hall of Parliament house in Canberra on Sorry Day 2007.

== Awards ==
In 2007, Bakar was named the NAIDOC Person of the year in recognition of his work.

Also in 2007, it was announced that Bakar was "West Australian of the Year", which made him a finalist for Australian of the Year in 2008.
