= Kuckles =

Australian musical group

- Origin: Broome, Western Australia, Australia
- Years active: 1981–1982
- Past members: Jimmy Chi; Stephen Pigram; Mick Manolis; Garry Gower; Patrick Bin Amat

Kuckles was an Aboriginal Australian band in the early 1980s.

== History ==
Kuckles (Broome kriol for cockles) formed in 1981 after a group of students from Broome, Western Australia moved to Adelaide, South Australia to study at the Centre for Aboriginal Studies in Music (CASM). Their music moved from acoustic calypso toward an electric reggae rock style, but also incorporated country, church music and rock.

Bart Willoughby, who was also at CASM and was a founder member of the band No Fixed Address around that time, played with the band on and off.

They recorded an audition tape, Milliya Rumarra, which won them a trip to Germany to the Third Annual International Cologne Song Festival in 1982. They returned to Broome later that year and disbanded.

Kuckles contributed to Chi's musicals Bran Nue Dae and Corrugation Road.

Chi and Manolis later were part of a new band called Bingurr, which means "moonlight" in Bardi. Pigram played with Scrap Metal and The Pigram Brothers.

== Discography ==
=== Studio albums ===
Title	Details
Milliya Rumarra: Brand New Day	Released: 1981; Label: Imparja; Format: Cassette
Songs from Bran Nue Dae	Released: 1990; Label: Bran Nue Dae Productions; Format: CD, Cassette

=== Soundtrack albums ===
Title	Details
Bran Nue Dae - Original Cast Recording (with Jimmy Chi)	Released: 1993; Label: BND Records Pty Ltd, PolyGram (BNDCD 002); Format: CD, Cassette
Corrugation Road (with Jimmy Chi and The Pigram Brothers)	Released: 1997; Label: Angoorrabin (AR-8); Format: CD

== Awards and nominations ==
=== Deadly Awards ===
The Deadly Awards were an annual celebration of Australian Aboriginal and Torres Strait Islander achievement in music, sport, entertainment and community. They ran from 1995 to 2013.

Year	Nominee / work	Award	Result (wins only)
1998	Corrugation Road (with Jimmy Chi and The Pigram Brothers)	Excellence in Film or Theatrical Score	Won
