= Black the Sun =

Studio album by Alex Lloyd
- Released: 5 July 1999
- Recorded: Q Studios, Sydney; Studios 301, Sydney
- Genre: Singer–songwriter, alternative, lo-fi
- Label: EMI
- Producer: Alex Lloyd, Ed Buller, Trent Williamson

Alex Lloyd chronology
Black the Sun (1999)	Watching Angels Mend (2001)

Singles from Black The Sun
- 1. "Black the Sun" Released: 24 July 1998; 2. "Lucky Star" Released: 23 May 1999; 3. "Something Special" Released: 26 August 1999; 4. "My Way Home" Released: 25 May 2000

Black the Sun is the debut studio album by the Australian singer–songwriter Alex Lloyd, released in July 1999 via EMI Records.

At the ARIA Music Awards of 2000, the album won Best Male Artist.

== Critical reception ==
Professional ratings
Review scores
Source	Rating
Phase9	(Positive)
The Guardian	4/5 stars

Black the Sun received critical acclaim. Triple J listeners voting it their album of the year in 1999. Writing for The Guardian in September 2000, John Aizlewood compared Lloyd's "eclectic approach" and "inspired turn of phrase" to that of Beck, and stated that the album "yields more with each play". He went on to draw comparison with the music of Crowded House, and singled out "Black the Sun", "What a Year" and "Backseat Clause" as the album's highlights, the latter, he noted, is a track which "closes the album in stark, lonesome fashion".

== Track listing ==
All tracks written by A. Wasiliev, except where noted.

1. "Melting"
2. "Momo"
3. "Something Special" (A. Wasiliev/S. Miller)
4. "Desert"
5. "Snow"
6. "My Way Home"
7. "Black The Sun"
8. "Lucky Star"
9. "What A Year" (A. Wasiliev/B. Quinn)
10. "Faraway"
11. "Aliens"
12. "Gender"
13. "Backseat Clause"

== Personnel ==
- Alex Lloyd – co-producer, guitar, vocals, programming, drums, bass

Additional musicians

- Louise Morgan – spoken word
- Trent Williamson – programming, harmonica
- Terapai Richmond – drums
- Daniel Denholm – string arrangement, vocal arrangement
- Clayton Doley – organ

Technical personnel

- Ed Buller – co-producer, programming
- Trent Williamson – co-producer

== Charts ==
=== Weekly charts ===
Chart (1999–2000)	Peak position
Australian Albums (ARIA)	9

=== Year-end charts ===
Chart (2000)	Position
ARIA Albums Chart	82

== Certification ==
Region	Certification	Certified units/sales
Australia (ARIA)	2× Platinum	140,000^{^}
^{^} Shipments figures based on certification alone.
