= Green (Alex Lloyd song) =

2002 single by Alex Lloyd

Single by Alex Lloyd

from the album Watching Angels Mend
- Released: 18 February 2002
- Length: 4:03
- Label: EMI
- Songwriter: Alex Lloyd
- Producers: Magnus Fiennes, Alex Lloyd

Alex Lloyd singles chronology
"Amazing" (2001)	"Green" (2002)	"Everybody's Laughing" (2002)

"Green" is a song by Australian singer-songwriter Alex Lloyd. The song was released on 18 February 2002 as the third single from his second studio album, Watching Angels Mend (2001). It peaked at number 25 in Australia.

== Track listing ==
- CD single (5504392)
1. "Green"
2. "Amazing" (live at Channel V)
3. "Lucky Star" (live at Channel V)
4. "Momo" (live at Channel V)

== Charts ==
Chart (2002)	Peak position
Australia (ARIA)	25

== Release history ==
Region	Date	Label	Format	Catalogue	Ref.
Australia	18 February 2002	EMI	CD	5504392	
