= Everybody's Laughing (Alex Lloyd song) =

Single by Alex Lloyd

from the album Watching Angels Mend
- Released: July 2002
- Genre: Rock
- Length: 3:51
- Label: EMI
- Songwriter(s): Alex Lloyd
- Producer(s): Magnus Fiennes, Steve Osbourne

Alex Lloyd singles chronology
"Green" (2001)	"Everybody's Laughing" (2002)	"Bus Ride" (2002)

"Everybody's Laughing" is a song by Alex Lloyd. The song was released in July 2002 as the fourth single from his second studio album, Watching Angels Mend. It peaked at number 33 in Australia.

== Track listing ==
- CD single 1
1. "Everybody's Laughing" (Radio Edit)
2. "A Break Outside"
3. "Mystery Train"
4. "Red Guitar"
- CD single 2
1. "Everybody's Laughing" (Radio Edit)
2. "In Light"
3. "I'll Be Your Baby Tonight"
4. "Something"

== Charts ==
Chart (2002)	Peak position
Australia (ARIA)	33

== Release history ==
Region	Date	Label	Format	Catalog
Australia	July 2002	EMI	CD single	5511372
