= Coming Home (Alex Lloyd song) =

2003 single by Alex Lloyd

Single by Alex Lloyd

from the album Distant Light
- Released: August 2003
- Label: EMI
- Songwriter(s): Alex Lloyd

Alex Lloyd singles chronology
"'Busride'" (2002)	"Coming Home" (2003)	"'1000 Miles'" (2003)

"Coming Home" is a single by Australian artist Alex Lloyd released in August 2003 by EMI Records. It won the 2003 ARIA Music Award for Best Male Artist.

The single peaked at No. 24 on the Australian ARIA Charts, and was ranked No. 39 on Triple J Hottest 100 for 2003.

"Coming Home" is the theme song for the Run Home program on SEN 1116, and the opening theme for Bondi Vet on Network Ten.

== Official track listing ==
Australian CD single (552867-2)

1. "Coming Home" (Single Version) - 3:11
2. "Golden Slumbers" - 1:45
3. "Bird on a Wire" - 3:33
4. "America" (Acoustic Version) - 3:31

== Peak positions ==
Chart (2003)	Peak position
Australia (ARIA)	24

== Richmond ==
"Coming Home (To Richmond)"

Single by Alex Lloyd
- Released: 21 February 2014
- Genre: Rock music
- Length: 2:36
- Label: Table Music
- Songwriter(s): Alex Lloyd

Alex Lloyd singles chronology
"Waterfall" (2013)	"Coming Home (To Richmond)" (2014)	"Good Thing" (2014)

"Coming Home (To Richmond)" is re-working of Coming Home released on 21 February 2014. The song was used by the Australian Football League team Richmond as their official membership campaign. A music video was also released which takes viewers though the game-day experience of Tiger fans – a grandfather and granddaughter, a group of friends, a dad and his young son, a family at home, as well as player, Brandon Ellis.

Proceeds from the song's sales went towards Richmond's charity partner The Alannah and Madeline Foundation, which assists and protects children against violence and bullying.

=== Charts ===
"Coming Home (To Richmond)" debuted and peaked at number 62 on the ARIA Charts. It was Lloyd's first appearance on the ARIA top 100 for eight years.

Country	Peak position
Australia (ARIA Charts)	62
Australian artist (ARIA Charts)	15

=== Release history ===
Region	Date	Label	Format
Australia	21 February 2016	Table Music	music download
