= Alex Lloyd =

Australian singer and songwriter (born 1974)

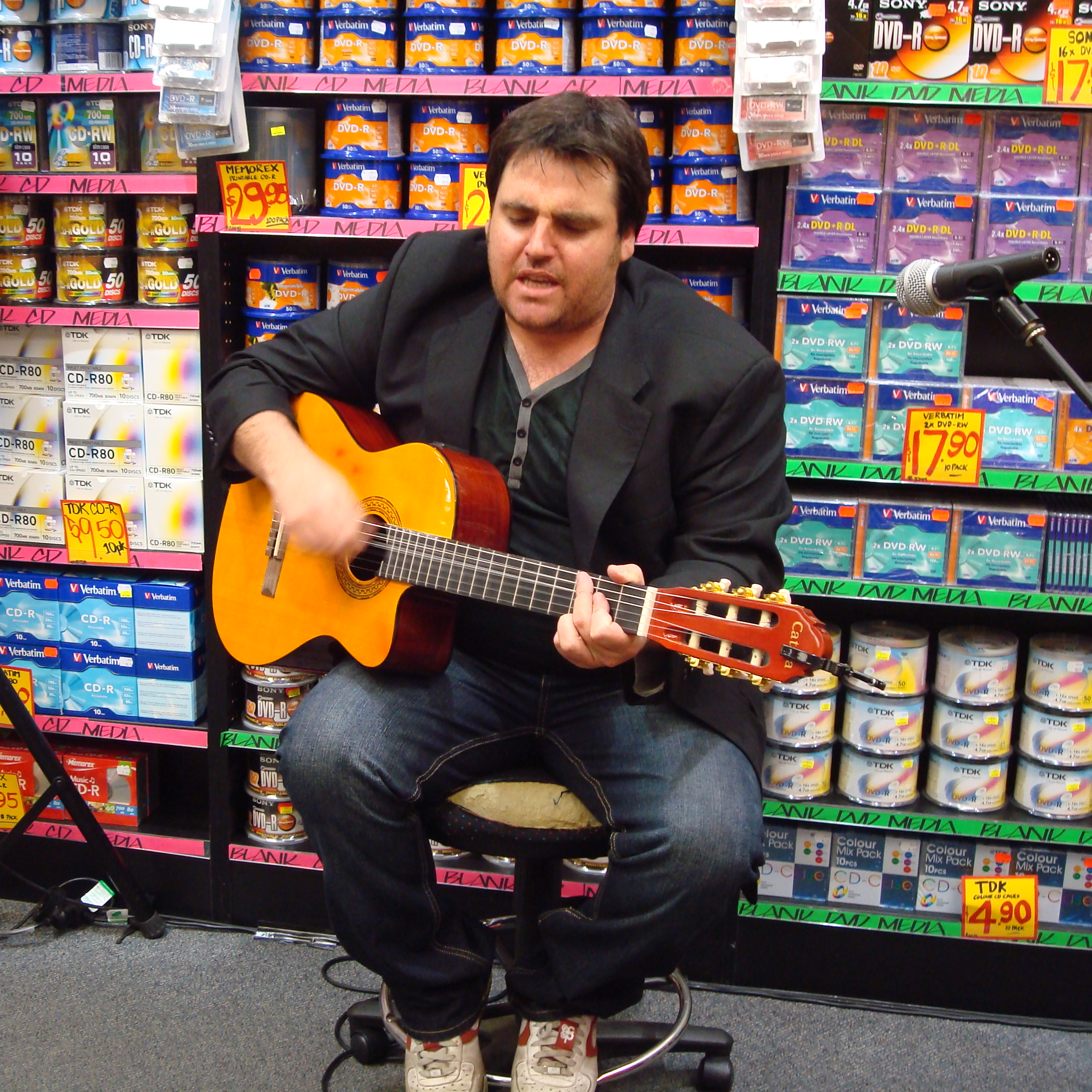

Background information
- Born: Alexander Wasiliev; Sydney, New South Wales, Australia
- Genres: Pop rock, folk rock, alternative rock
- Occupation: Singer-songwriter
- Instruments: Vocals, guitar, keyboards
- Years active: 1997–present
- Label: Table Music distributed by Inertia
- Website: alexlloyd.com

Alexander Lloyd (né Wasiliev) is an Australian singer and songwriter. Four of his albums, Black the Sun, Watching Angels Mend, Distant Light, and Alex Lloyd, released between 1999 and 2005, made the top ten on the ARIA charts. Lloyd has also won the ARIA Award for Best Male Artist on three occasions.

== Early life and education ==
Alexander Wasiliev was born to a father of Russian descent and a mother of Irish descent. Lloyd grew up in the inner Sydney suburb of Balmain, and attended Balmain High School (now Sydney Secondary College Balmain Campus).

At the age of 15, Lloyd was a member of a school rock band that won the 1990 Balmain Battle of the Bands. This mainly blues-rock band evolved into "The Beefs", which began playing in local pubs and clubs and into the indie rock band Mother Hubbard. Lloyd adopted his mother's maiden name 'Lloyd', following her unexpected death in 1991.

== Career ==
=== 1998–2002: Black the Sun and Watching Angels Mend ===
Early in 1998, Lloyd released his debut single "Peepshow/Momo", which did not chart. In July 1998, Lloyd released the single "Black the Sun", the lead from his debut album of the same name. The song peaked at number 86 on the ARIA Charts. Lloyd's debut studio album, Black the Sun was released in July 1999. It peaked at number 9 on the ARIA Charts and was certified 2× Platinum. Triple J listeners voting it their album of the year in 1999. At the ARIA Music Awards of 2000, Lloyd won ARIA Award for Best Male Artist.

In 2001, Lloyd released "Downtown" and "Amazing", the lead singles from his second album. "Amazing" became his best-performing single, peaking within the top 20 in Australia and being certified gold. It was voted in a number 1 on the Triple J Hottest 100, 2001. At the APRA Music Awards of 2002, the song won Single of the Year. The accompanying video was directed by Ryan Renshaw. Watching Angels Mend was released in September 2001 and peaked at number 2 in Australia and was certified 3× platinum. Two further top-40 singles in Australia followed in 2002: "Green" and "Everybody's Laughing". At the ARIA Music Awards of 2002, Lloyd was nominated for seven awards, winning ARIA Award for Best Male Artist for a second time.

=== 2003–2004: Distant Light, Alex Lloyd and Amazing: The Best of Alex Lloyd ===
In August 2003, Lloyd released "Coming Home", the lead single from his third studio album. The song peaked at number 24 on the ARIA Charts. At the ARIA Music Awards of 2003, the song won Lloyd the vARIA Award for Best Male Artist for a third time.

Lloyd's third studio album Distant Light was released in September 2003. The album peaked at number 9 on the ARIA Charts and was certified gold. It spawned two more top 50 singles in "1000 Miles" and "Beautiful".

In August 2005, Alex Lloyd released "Never Meant to Fail", the lead single from his fourth studio album. The song reached the top 30 in Australia. On 25 October 2005, Lloyd released his self-titled fourth studio album. The album peaked at number 7 on the ARIA Charts and was certified platinum. In April 2006, Lloyd performed in the grand finale of Dancing with the Stars, singing his breakthrough song, "Amazing". His performance on the show saw the album re-entered the albums charts.

In September 2006, Lloyd released his first greatest hits album, titled Amazing: The Best of Alex Lloyd. It was his final on EMI Music. A limited edition of the album features a second album of B-sides and rarities and it peaked at number 34.

=== 2008–2011: Good in the Face of a Stranger and the Mad Bastards Trio ===
In November 2008, Lloyd released his fifth studio album Good in the Face of a Stranger through Inertia. The album peaked at number 80 on the ARIA Chart. The album spawned two singles, the first, "Slow Train" featured a video clip made with 7,000 hand-drawn pictures. The album's second single, "What We Started", was released in March 2009 and subsequently used as song on the television show 90210.

In 2011, Lloyd began touring with Steve and Alan Pigram from the Pigram Brothers. The trio had worked on the soundtrack for the Australian film Mad Bastards, and subsequently became known as the Mad Bastards Trio, using the tour to promote the film, which was released on 5 May 2011. The tour ended later that month. The Mad Bastards Trio also performed on Adam Hills in Gordon Street Tonight and also had an interview with George Negus about the music and the film itself. One of Lloyd's songs from Good in the Face of a Stranger, "Slow Train" made it onto the soundtrack, along with songs written by the Pigram Brothers, but the majority of the soundtrack was written as a collaboration between the trio. At the APRA Music Awards of 2011 the trio received three nominations. At the ARIA Music Awards of 2011, the album was nominated for Best Original Soundtrack/Cast/Show Album.

=== 2012–2015: Urban Wilderness and "Coming Home (To Richmond)" ===
In March 2013, Lloyd began road-testing new songs on a limited tour. Speaking to The Newcastle Herald, Lloyd announced the title of the album as Urban Wilderness. In August 2013, Lloyd released the first single from the album, "Better the Less You Know", featuring footage of people listening to the song in London and on the Central Coast. The album was released on 18 October 2013, and was met with a mostly positive reception. Late in 2013, Lloyd performed his first Australian tour in over five years.

In 2014, Lloyd collaborated with the Richmond Football Club, releasing "Coming Home (To Richmond)"; a combination of his original 2003 single with references made to the AFL club. Lloyd subsequently adopted the Tigers as his club. The song became his first re-entry into the Australia Top 100 in over eight years, peaking at number 62 on the ARIA Charts.

A third single from Urban Wilderness was released in April 2014, titled "Good Thing".

=== 2016–2017: Acoustica ===
On 11 February 2016, Liberation Music announced that Lloyd would be releasing an acoustic album as part of their acoustic series, featuring re-imaginings of many of his most successful tracks. The following day, an acoustic version of "Coming Home" was released on their YouTube channel. Lloyd also began touring with Australian rock band Icehouse for their tour dates in Newcastle, Sydney, Melbourne and Canberra throughout February and March 2016.

Acoustica was released on 5 August 2016 and peaked at number 45 on ARIA charts.

=== 2018–2019: Black the Sun 20th Anniversary Tour ===
Following an appearance at A Day on the Green in 2018 and supporting The Whitlams on their national tour of 2018, Lloyd announced a 20th-anniversary release of his debut album Black the Sun. The subsequent national tour, took place from October–November and was a success, with multiple sell out shows.

=== 2021–present: "Amazing" 20th Anniversary Tour and new album ===
Following the reopening of venues during the COVID-19 pandemic, Lloyd announced an eleven-date acoustic tour to celebrate the 20th-anniversary release of "Amazing".

In May 2022, Lloyd released his first single in eight years, "Trojan Horse", coinciding with the commencement of the tour.

In August 2025, Lloyd was the subject of an episode on Australian Story titled Dark Star.

== Personal life ==
Lloyd is married to Amelia Wasiliev and they have three sons and one daughter. Lloyd and Wasiliev separated in 2012.

== Discography ==
=== Albums ===
List of studio albums, with selected chart positions and certifications
Title	Album details	Peak chart positions		Certifications
Title	Album details	AUS	NZ	Certifications
Black the Sun	Released: 5 July 1999; Label: EMI Music	9	—	ARIA: 2× Platinum
Watching Angels Mend	Released: September 2001; Label: EMI Music	2	22	ARIA: 3× Platinum
Distant Light	Released: September 2003; Label: EMI Music	9	—	ARIA: Gold
Alex Lloyd	Released: October 2005; Label: Epic	7	—	ARIA: Platinum
Good in the Face of a Stranger	Released: November 2008; Label: Inertia Records	80	—	
Urban Wilderness	Released: October 2013; Label: Table Music	180	—	
Acoustica	Released: 5 August 2016; Label: Liberation Music	45	—	
"—" denotes the album did not chart or achieve certification

=== Soundtrack albums ===
List of soundtrack albums
Title	Album details
Mad Bastards (with The Pigram Brothers)	Released: 2011; Label: Bush Turkey Films (BTF001)

=== Compilation albums ===
List of compilation albums, with selected chart positions
Title	Album details	Peak chart positions	
Title	Album details	AUS	NZ
Watching Angels Mend / Black the Sun	Released: 2002; Label: EMI Music; Double pack of first two albums	20	—
Amazing: The Best of Alex Lloyd	Released: 2006; Label: EMI Music; First Greatest Hits album	34	—
Rare Tracks & B-Sides	Released: 2011; Label: EMI Music	—	—

=== Extended plays ===
List of extended plays
Title	EP details
Black the Sun	Released: 1998; Label: EMI (724388549820)

=== Singles ===
Year	Single	Peak chart positions					Certification	Album
Year	Single	AUS	AUS JJJ Hottest 100	NLD	NZ	UK	Certification	Album
1998	"Peepshow/Momo"	209	—	—	—	—		non-album single
1998	"Black the Sun"	86	—	—	—	—		Black the Sun
1999	"Lucky Star"	91	21	—	—	—		Black the Sun
1999	"Something Special"	181	—	—	—	—		Black the Sun
2000	"My Way Home"	50	—	—	—	—		Black the Sun
2001	"Downtown"	75	63	—	—	—		Watching Angels Mend
2001	"Amazing"	14	1	91	1	176	ARIA: Platinum	Watching Angels Mend
2002	"Green"	25	—	—	—	—		Watching Angels Mend
2002	"Everybody's Laughing"	33	—	—	—	—		Watching Angels Mend
2002	"Bus Ride"	144	—	—	—	—		Watching Angels Mend
2003	"Coming Home"	24	39	—	—	—		Distant Light
2003	"1000 Miles"	32	—	—	—	—		Distant Light
2004	"Beautiful"	30	—	—	—	—		Distant Light
2004	"Hello the End"	—	—	—	—	146		Distant Light
2005	"Never Meant to Fail"	27	—	—	—	—		Alex Lloyd
2005	"The Wonder"	—	—	—	—	—		Alex Lloyd
2006	"Brand New Day"	53	—	—	—	—		Alex Lloyd
2008	"Slow Train"	—	—	—	—	—		Good in the Face of a Stranger
2009	"What We Started"	—	—	—	—	—		Good in the Face of a Stranger
2013	"Better the Less You Know"	—	—	—	—	—		Urban Wilderness
2013	"Waterfall"	—	—	—	—	—		Urban Wilderness
2014	"Coming Home (To Richmond)"	62	—	—	—	—		Non-album single
2014	"Good Thing"	—	—	—	—	—		Urban Wilderness
2016	"Coming Home"	—	—	—	—	—		Acoustica
2016	"Mockingbird"	—	—	—	—	—		Non-album single
2022	"Trojan Horse"	—	—	—	—	—		TBA
"—" denotes the single did not chart or achieve certification

== Awards and nominations ==
=== ARIA Awards ===
The ARIA Music Awards are a set of annual ceremonies presented by Australian Recording Industry Association (ARIA), which recognise excellence, innovation, and achievement across all genres of the music of Australia. They commenced in 1987. Lloyd has won four awards.

Year	Award	Work	Result
1999	Breakthrough Artist – Single	"Lucky Star"	Won
1999	Best Male Artist	"Lucky Star"	Nominated
2000	Breakthrough Artist – Album	Black the Sun	Nominated
2000	Best Male Artist	Black the Sun	Won
2000	Album of the Year	Black the Sun	Nominated
2002	Producer of the Year	Watching Angels Mend	Nominated
2002	Best Rock Album	Watching Angels Mend	Nominated
2002	Best Male Artist	Watching Angels Mend	Won
2002	Highest Selling Album	Watching Angels Mend	Nominated
2002	Album of the Year	Watching Angels Mend	Nominated
2002	Highest Selling Single	"Amazing"	Nominated
2002	Single of the Year	"Amazing"	Nominated
2003	Best Male Artist	"Coming Home"	Won
2004	Engineer of the Year	Distant Light	Nominated
2004	Best Male Artist	Distant Light	Nominated
2011	Best Original Soundtrack/Cast/Show Album	Mad Bastards (Music from the Motion Picture) (with the Pigram Brothers)	Nominated

=== APRA Awards ===
The APRA Awards are several award ceremonies run in Australia by the Australasian Performing Right Association (APRA) to recognise composing and song writing skills, sales and airplay performance by its members annually.

Year	Award	Work	Result
2002	Song of the Year	"Amazing"	Won
2011	Best Original Song Composed for the Screen	"Won't Look Back" (with the Pigram Brothers)	Nominated
2011	Best Soundtrack Album	"Mad Bastards – Music from the Motion Picture" (with the Pigram Brothers)	Nominated
2011	Feature Film Score of the Year	"Mad Bastards – Music from the Motion Picture" (with the Pigram Brothers)	Nominated
