= Corrugation Road =

Australian musical

- Poster for 1998 Australian tour
- Music: Jimmy Chi and Kuckles
- Lyrics: Jimmy Chi and Kuckles
- Book: Jimmy Chi
- Productions: 1996 Melbourne; 1998 Australian tour

Corrugation Road is an Australian musical set in a mental hospital, about an Aboriginal schizophrenic patient. It was written by Jimmy Chi, his band Kuckles and friends, the creators of Bran Nue Dae. It is based on Chi's own experiences at Perth's Graylands Hospital.

== Production history ==
Corrugation Road was produced by Perth's Black Swan Theatre and had two successful theatre runs in 1996–1997 and 1998.

The musical previewed at the Canberra Theatre from 10 October 1996 during the National Festival of Australian Theatre. It subsequently had its official premiere in Melbourne at the Fairfax Studio, Victorian Arts Centre from 17 October 1996 as part of the Melbourne International Festival of the Arts. The tour then played Perth (Subiaco Theatre Centre) and Adelaide (Playhouse, Adelaide Festival Centre) through late 1996 and early 1997.

The production was remounted in June 1998 at the Playhouse Theatre in Perth before undertaking an Australian national tour.

== Reception ==
The musical won The Age's award for creative excellence at the 1996 Melbourne International Festival of the Arts (shared with the performance art work Urban Dream Capsule). It also won the Deadly for Excellence in Film or Theatrical Score in 1998 for Jimmy Chi, Kuckles and The Pigram Brothers. For the Melbourne season of Corrugation Road, Andrew Ross (director), Steve Dolan (set and costumes), Iain Grandage (musical director and arranger), and Anna Mercer (choreographer) all received nominations in the music theatre Staging and Musical Direction category of the 1996 Green Room Awards.
