= Amazing (Alex Lloyd song) =

2001 single by Alex Lloyd

Single by Alex Lloyd

from the album Watching Angels Mend
- B-side: "Downtown"; "My Way Home" (live); "What a Year" (live)
- Released: 17 September 2001
- Studio: Town House (London, England)
- Length: 3:22
- Label: EMI
- Songwriter: Alexander Wasiliev
- Producers: Magnus Fiennes; Alex Lloyd

Alex Lloyd singles chronology
"Downtown" (2001)	"Amazing" (2001)	"Green" (2002)

Audio sample
- file; help

"Amazing" is a song written by Australian singer-songwriter Alex Lloyd. The song was released on 17 September 2001 as the second single from his second studio album, Watching Angels Mend (2001). It was a success in Australia, reaching number 14 on the ARIA Singles Chart, and in New Zealand, where it topped the RIANZ Singles Chart in March 2002. It was also ranked number one on the Triple J Hottest 100 of 2001, Australia's largest annual music poll.

At the ARIA Music Awards of 2002, the song was nominated for Single of the Year and Highest Selling Single, losing out on both to "Can't Get You Out of My Head" by Kylie Minogue. At the APRA Music Awards of 2002 the song won the 'Song of the Year' award. In January 2018, as part of Triple M's "Ozzest 100", the 'most Australian' songs of all time, "Amazing" was ranked number 80. Lloyd was interviewed on Double J for the 20th anniversary of the song topping Triple J "Hottest 100". He stated that the song was written as a "beautiful goodbye" to a relationship with an older, more experienced partner.

== Music video ==
The video clip of this song was filmed around the Southern Highlands in New South Wales. It features a schoolgirl named Sarah living in the year 1976. One day while travelling to school by bus, Sarah notices a young man walking near the road. She decides to skip school and have her own freedom including writing her name in a local toilet, rowing a boat, drawing a picture and walking around the streets in her local town. Sarah's freedom is cut short when her mum sees her in a library. At the end, Sarah is shown in uniform waiting for a bus to get to school.

== Track listings ==
- Australian CD single
1. "Amazing" – 3:24
2. "Downtown" – 4:45
3. "My Way Home" (XFM live session) – 4:20
4. "What a Year" (XFM live session) – 4:00
- UK CD single
1. "Amazing"
2. "My Way Home" (XFM live session)
3. "What a Year" (XFM live session)

== Credits and personnel ==
Credits are adapted from the Australian CD single liner notes.

Studios

- Recorded and mixed at the Town House (London, England)
- Additional recording at Dubshack
- Engineered at the Town House (London, England)

Personnel

- Alex Lloyd – writing (as Alexander Wasiliev), acoustic guitar, electric guitars, bass, production, additional recording, programming
- Magnus Fiennes – keyboards, string arrangement, production, additional recording, programming
- Shawn Lee – drums
- Ged Lynch – percussion
- Brian Gascoigne – string conducting
- Jeremy Wheatley – mixing
- Niven Garland – engineering
- The Weatherman – additional Pro Tools
- Rick Featherstone – additional Pro Tools
- Kevin Wilkins – art direction

== Charts ==
=== Weekly charts ===
Chart (2001–2002)	Peak position
Australia (ARIA)	14
Netherlands (Single Top 100)	91
New Zealand (Recorded Music NZ)	1

=== Year-end charts ===
Chart (2001)	Position
Australia (ARIA)	71

Chart (2002)	Position
New Zealand (RIANZ)	10

== Certification ==
Region	Certification	Certified units/sales
Australia (ARIA)	Platinum	70,000^{^}
^{^} Shipments figures based on certification alone.

== Release history ==
Region	Date	Format(s)	Label(s)	Catalogue	Ref.
Australia	17 September 2001	EMI	CD	8798972	
United States	19 August 2002	Nettwerk	Triple A radio	—N/a	

== Lawsuit ==
In 2008, Lloyd was sued for copyright over the song's lyrics by truck driver Mark O'Keefe. O'Keefe claimed that he wrote the lyrics on the back of a coaster after both Lloyd and O'Keefe played a gig at a Sydney pub back in 1991 and demanded royalties from Lloyd. The lawsuit was dismissed by the Federal Court in October 2009.

== Other uses ==
In 2004 the song was licensed for use in advertisements for the Ford Territory 4-wheel drive (SUV) vehicle. It has been used in two other TV advertisements, reportedly earning Lloyd payments of "hundreds of thousands of dollars".

In 2024 Woolworths used the song as the background to their 'Fresh Fuels The Best In All Of Us' campaign featuring Paralympic swimmer Col Pearse.

In 2026 Qantas used an instrumental version of the song as the background to their preflight safety video.
