= Bran Nue Dae =

1990 Australian stage musical

- Poster of 1993 production in Melbourne
- Music: Jimmy Chi; Kuckles
- Lyrics: Jimmy Chi; Kuckles
- Book: Jimmy Chi
- Productions: 1990 Perth; 1990–1991 national tour 1993 Melbourne/Perth; 2009 Film Adaptation

Bran Nue Dae is a 1990 musical set in Broome, Western Australia, that tells stories and of issues relating to Indigenous Australians. It was written by Jimmy Chi and his band Kuckles and friends, and was the first Aboriginal Australian musical. The name is a phonetic representation of "Brand New Day".

== Background and description ==
The musical was originally directed by Andrew Ross and choreographed by Michael Leslie. It premiered at the Octagon Theatre in February–March 1990 as part of the Festival of Perth, and later toured nationally.

The musical won the Sidney Myer Performing Arts Awards in 1990. The following year the published script and score won the Special Award in the Western Australian Premier's Book Awards. Theatre critic Katharine Brisbane wrote in 1999:

Bran Nue Dae in 1989 was a turning point in the short history of Aboriginal writing for the theatre. Twenty years of evolution: in writers, political activists, actors, dancers, singers and song-writers, preceded it.

Gail Mabo performed in the Sydney run of the musical in 1991. A 1991 television documentary Bran Nue Dae tells the story of the creation of the musical.

The musical was revived for an Australian national tour in 2020.

== Film version ==
The musical has been turned into a feature film of the same title, directed by Rachel Perkins starring Ernie Dingo, Geoffrey Rush, Jessica Mauboy, Missy Higgins, Deborah Mailman, Magda Szubanski and Dan Sultan. It premiered at the Melbourne International Film Festival and won the Audience Award for Best Film. It was theatrically released in Australia on 14 January 2010. It debuted with $2.5 million in its first week, solidifying it as a box office hit. It went on to gross over $7 million, making it one of the most successful Australian films of all time.
