= Spirit of Place (album) =

Studio album by Goanna
- Released: November 1982
- Recorded: March–June 1982
- Genre: Folk rock
- Length: 47:34
- Labels: Atco Records (US); WEA Australia; BMG Australia (reissue)
- Producer: Trevor Lucas

Goanna chronology
The Goanna Band (1979)	Spirit of Place (1982)	Oceania (1985)

Singles from Spirit of Place
- 1. "Solid Rock" Released: September 1982; 2. "Razor's Edge" Released: March 1983

Spirit of Place is the debut studio album by Australian folk rock band Goanna. It was originally released in November 1982, it peaked at No. 2 on the Australian Kent Music Report Albums Chart and was certified double platinum by May 1983.

Spirit of Place was the first charting rock record to feature the didgeridoo. The didgeridoo is particularly prominent on "Solid Rock", which was a No. 3 hit on the Kent Music Report Singles Chart in October. The album was also heavy on social protest themes; "Solid Rock" deals with issues of land rights for Indigenous Australians. "Razor's Edge" tackled rural despair and achieved a Top 40 spot in April 1983. The album was re-released in a remastered and expanded form in 2003.

== Background ==
The Goanna Band was formed as an Australian folk rock group in 1977. The original line-up was Mike Biscan (guitar), Richard Griffiths (bass guitar), Shane Howard (lead vocals, guitar) and Rod Hoe (drums). In 1979, the group was Howard with keyboardist and vocalist Rose Bygrave, drummer Gary Crothall, lead guitarist and vocalist Warwick Harwood, vocalist and harmonica player Ian Morrison and bass guitarist Carl Smith. They recorded the independent 12-inch EP, The Goanna Band, which was produced by ex-Dingoes lead vocalist Broderick Smith. By mid-1981, they had updated the line-up with Peter 'Brolga' Coughlan on bass and Robbie Ross on drums. They then shortened the name to Goanna and with their increasing popularity they attracted the interest of major record companies.

In August 1981, they supported James Taylor on the Australian leg of his tour, where they met Billy Payne, who would later become the producer of their second album, Oceania. In February 1982, they signed to WEA Australia. The band released its single "Solid Rock" in September. According to Howard, the inspiration came on a ten-day camping trip at Uluru (also known as Ayers Rock) during 1980 where he had a "spiritual awakening" which brought "the fire in the belly" to the surface over injustices to Australia's indigenous peoples. WEA was reluctant to issue it as a single and even Shane initially had reservations about whether commercial radio would play it because of its politically sensitive theme but then Howard insisted on its release to make a statement about the European invasion of Australia. "Solid Rock" peaked at No. 3 on the Australian Kent Music Report Singles Chart, remaining in the Top 50 for 26 weeks. It reached No. 31 on the US Billboard Mainstream Rock Chart and appeared on the Billboard Hot 100.

Goanna released their debut album, Spirit of Place, in November. It was produced by Trevor Lucas, a member of UK folk rock group Fairport Convention, who had returned to Australia in 1979. Spirit of Place reached No. 2 on the Kent Music Report Albums Chart. It also reached No. 179 on the US Billboard 200. For the album, Goanna were Bygrave, Peter Coughlan on bass guitar, Graham Davidge (ex-Little River Band) on guitar, Harwood, Howard, his sister Marcia Howard on backing vocals, Mick "The Reverend" O’Connor on keyboards and Robert Ross on drums. An ever-changing lineup saw Harwood leave the band soon after its release.

On 13 February 1983, Gordon Franklin & the Wilderness Ensemble performed "Let the Franklin Flow" at the People for Nuclear Disarmament Concert in Sidney Myer Music Bowl. The ensemble included members of Goanna and fellow folk rock group Redgum, and Lucas. In May, "Let the Franklin Flow" was issued as a single with Lucas and Jeff Chapell as producers. Howard, the song's writer, was credited as F. River. The single reached No. 12 nationally. Proceeds supported the Tasmanian Wilderness Society's campaign against the proposed damming of Tasmania's Gordon and Franklin Rivers for a hydroelectricity project. Howard physically supported the protests by joining the picket lines. The B-side of the single, "Franklin River – World Heritage", was written and recorded by the Society's director, Bob Brown, who later became a senator and the leader of Australian Greens.

On 19 April 1983, Goanna won three Countdown Music and Video Awards for their work in 1982: Spirit of Place won 'Best Debut Album', "Solid Rock" won 'Best Debut Single' and the band itself won 'Best New Talent (Johnny O'Keefe Memorial Award)'. "Solid Rock" is the first charting rock record to feature extensive use of the didgeridoo, one of the world's oldest wood instruments, played by Billy Inda (No Fixed Address). The follow-up single, "Razor's Edge" (a reworking of a song from their 1979 EP), was released in March 1983. The more acoustically based folk-rock track reached No. 36.

In 2003, "Spirit of Place" was digitally re-mastered by Shane with the addition of 7 previously unreleased tracks including three live versions. The album continues to chart in the Australian Top 200 with "Solid Rock" appearing on several Australian rock compilation releases and the video being shown from time to time on the ABC's Rage music video program even though the song celebrated its 40th anniversary in October 2022.

== Track listing ==
All tracks written by Shane Howard except where noted.

No.	Title	Length
1.	"Cheatin' Man"	4:51
2.	"Solid Rock"	4:32
3.	"Razor's Edge" (Howard, Ian Morrison)	5:12
4.	"Scenes (from an occasional window)"	4:32
5.	"Stand Yr' Ground"	3:56
6.	"Borderline"	4:45
7.	"On the Platform" (Rose Bygrave)	5:16
8.	"Four Weeks Gone"	5:47
9.	"Factory Man"	3:41
10.	"Children of the Southern Land"	5:04

2003 re-release bonus tracks
No.	Title	Length
11.	"On the Platform [Reprise - Instrumental]" (Bygrave)	1:24
12.	"How Far Down"	4:34
13.	"Shadow of Your Love"	1:42
14.	"Undertow"	4:35
15.	"Let the Franklin Flow (Live)"	3:38
16.	"Underfoot, Underground (Live)" (Kerryn Tolhurst)	4:24
17.	"Solid Rock (Live)"	7:59

== Charts ==
=== Weekly charts ===
Chart (1982/83)	Peak position
Australia (Kent Music Report)	2

=== Year-end charts ===
Chart (1983)	Peak position
Australia (Kent Music Report)	8

== Certifications ==
Region	Certification	Certified units/sales
Australia (ARIA)	4× Platinum	280,000^{^}
^{^} Shipments figures based on certification alone.

== Personnel ==
Goanna members

- Roslyn Bygrave – synthesiser (tracks 2, 4, 10), electric piano (tracks 1, 3, 10), acoustic piano (tracks 1, 4, 7), keyboards (track 8), lead vocals (track 5, 7), backing vocals (tracks 2, 3, 4, 6, 8)
- Peter Coughlan – acoustic guitar (track 5), bass guitar (tracks 1, 2, 3, 4, 5, 6, 8, 9 10)
- Graham Davidge – guitar, electric guitar (tracks 1, 2, 3, 5, 6, 7, 8, 9)
- Ross Hannaford – electric guitar (track 3)
- Warrick Harwood – electric guitar (tracks 1, 2, 3, 4, 5, 6, 8, 9, 10)
- Marcia Howard – lead vocals (track 1), backing vocals (tracks 2, 3, 4, 5, 6, 8)
- Shane Howard – acoustic guitar (3, 4, 8, 9, 10), electric guitar, lead vocals (1, 2, 3, 4, 6, 8, 9, 10)
- Ian Morrison – backing vocals (tracks 3, 4, 7, 9)
- Mick O'Connor – organ (Hammond) (tracks 5, 6, 10)
- Robert Ross – percussion, drums (tracks 1, 2, 3, 4, 5, 6, 8, 9, 10)

Additional musicians

- Joe Camilleri – saxophone (track 5)
- Billy Inda – didjeridu (track 2)
- Judi Kenneally – backing vocals
- Trevor Lucas – acoustic guitar (tracks 3, 6, 9)
- Simon & Justin Madden (The Nestle's Canteen Gentleman's Chorus) - backing vocals (track 9)

Production details

- Manning Clark - Liner notes
- Peter Jones - Arranger (strings) (track 2)
- Trevor Lucas - Producer
- Tony Buettel - Studio engineer
- Bill Dart - Live sound engineer
- Kevin Bishop - Monitors engineer
- Studios - Rhinoceros Studios (Sydney); Allan Eaton Sound, Platinum Productions and AAV Australia (Melbourne)
- Judi Kenneally - Cover artwork
- Rob Harwood - Video archivist
- Bob Welsh - Guitar technician
- Gary Radbourne - Drum technician
- Brewster Everett - Good vibes
- Ian Lovell - Management
