= Scott Darlow =

Australian singer-songwriter

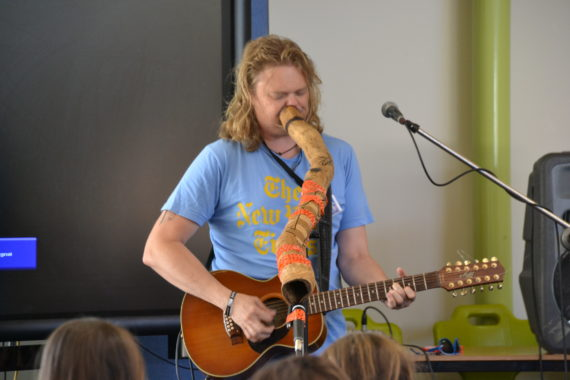
- Darlow in 2016.

Background information
- Born: Melbourne, Victoria, Australia
- Origin: RMIT
- Genres: Rock; Metal
- Occupations: Musician; Singer; Songwriter; Public speaker
- Instruments: Vocals; guitar; didgeridoo
- Years active: 2002–present

Scott Darlow is an Australian singer, songwriter, guitarist, didgeridoo player and public speaker from Melbourne, Victoria.

== Early life and education ==
Darlow was born in Melbourne, Australia to Salvation Army parents, the second of four children, Darlow moved to Hong Kong at five years of age. He spent the next six years there attending Beacon Hill Primary School before returning to Melbourne to begin high school. Two years at Essendon Grammar were then followed by another move to Perth, Western Australia, where he attended Hollywood Senior High School. After this, he moved back to Melbourne where he completed school at Strathmore High School.

Following on from high school, Darlow began a teaching degree at RMIT. During this time, he also worked in bars and pubs, including a two-year stint at Melbourne Hilton on the Park. Upon completion of his university studies, Darlow worked at three high schools and one primary school, teaching music. After two and a half years of full-time teaching, he resigned to focus on writing music, recording and touring.

== Career ==
=== Music career ===
Darlow started playing the cornet at five years of age. With both of his parents being Salvation Army Officers, his first musical experiences were watching the brass band at Hawthorn Salvation Army. He is said to have fallen in love with music from that moment on, determined to play in the band just like the men he watched each Sunday. He was given a cornet at five years of age, and started playing in a brass band at age seven. From there, he learned to play Beach Boys and Beatles songs. Darlow continued to play the trumpet throughout high school, along with classical guitar. It was also at this time that he started playing trumpet and saxophone in bands around Melbourne. Darlow is said to be proficient on the trumpet, trombone, saxophone, clarinet, didgeridoo, piano and guitar, as well as being a singer.

At nineteen years of age, he decided to start taking his guitar playing more seriously and began writing songs. After being introduced to and mentored by Melbourne gospel artist Paul Colman, Darlow began recording his first album, entitled Be with You, with indie producer David Carr. It was released under the name of his band at the time, The Darlow Show, in January 2003. This album included crowd favourite track "Sorry", a song about his Aboriginal heritage which included a vocal part from AFL footballer David Wirrpanda.

This was followed in 2005 by a live acoustic album called Underground, also released under The Darlow Show moniker. In 2008, Darlow released a third album called The Whole Earth Sings, this time under his own name. Total combined sales of physical copies of these albums exceeded 23,000.

In January 2016, Darlow released the first single from his fifth album, "Solid Rock", a cover of the Goanna hit from 1982. Darlow enlisted the help of the song's author and original singer, Shane Howard, on vocals and recorded it as a duet. "Solid Rock" was added to radio stations all over Australia and New Zealand and was the most-played rock song on Australian radio in February 2016. Similarly, the music video for the single went viral after radio station Triple M shared the video via Facebook, garnering over 200,000 viewers.

Darlow released their second single from the album, "Down Like Flies", in late May 2016. This second single got solid radio play around Australia, with the supporting music video featuring well known Australian actor Matt Hetherington, TV personality Melissa Hetherington, TV and radio personality and author, Jane Gazzo as well as Darlow's son Emmanuel. January 2018 saw radio success for Darlow, in the form of his most recent release, a remake of an older production "Sorry", an apologetic song that protests white settlement in Australia and the mistreatment of Aboriginal people in the following centuries.

In 2018, Darlow enlisted the help of fellow Australian musicians Sarah McLeod, Adam Brand, Jack Jones and Todd Hunter to re-record the Dragon song "Rain" with all net proceeds from the sale to go towards the Buy-a-bale program in support of Australian farmers suffering from the Australian drought. He also visited many schools including SMIC.

== Discography ==
=== Albums ===
List of albums, with selected details
Title	Details
Be With You (as The Darlow Show)	Released: 2003; Format: CD; Label: The Darlow Show (TDS0001)
Underground: Live and Acoustic At The Soak (as The Darlow Show)	Released: 2005; Format: CD; Label: The Darlow Show (TDS0002)
The Whole Earth Sings (as Darlow)	Released: 2008; Format: CD; Label: The Darlow Show (TDS03)
All I Am	Released: December 2011; Format: CD; Label: Scott Darlow (SWD001)
Sorry	Released: November 2016; Format: CD, digital; Label: Scott Darlow
Deadly Heart	Released: 26 October 2023; Format: CD, digital; Label: Reclusive Records
