= Suzie Dickinson =

Australian singer (1955–2018)

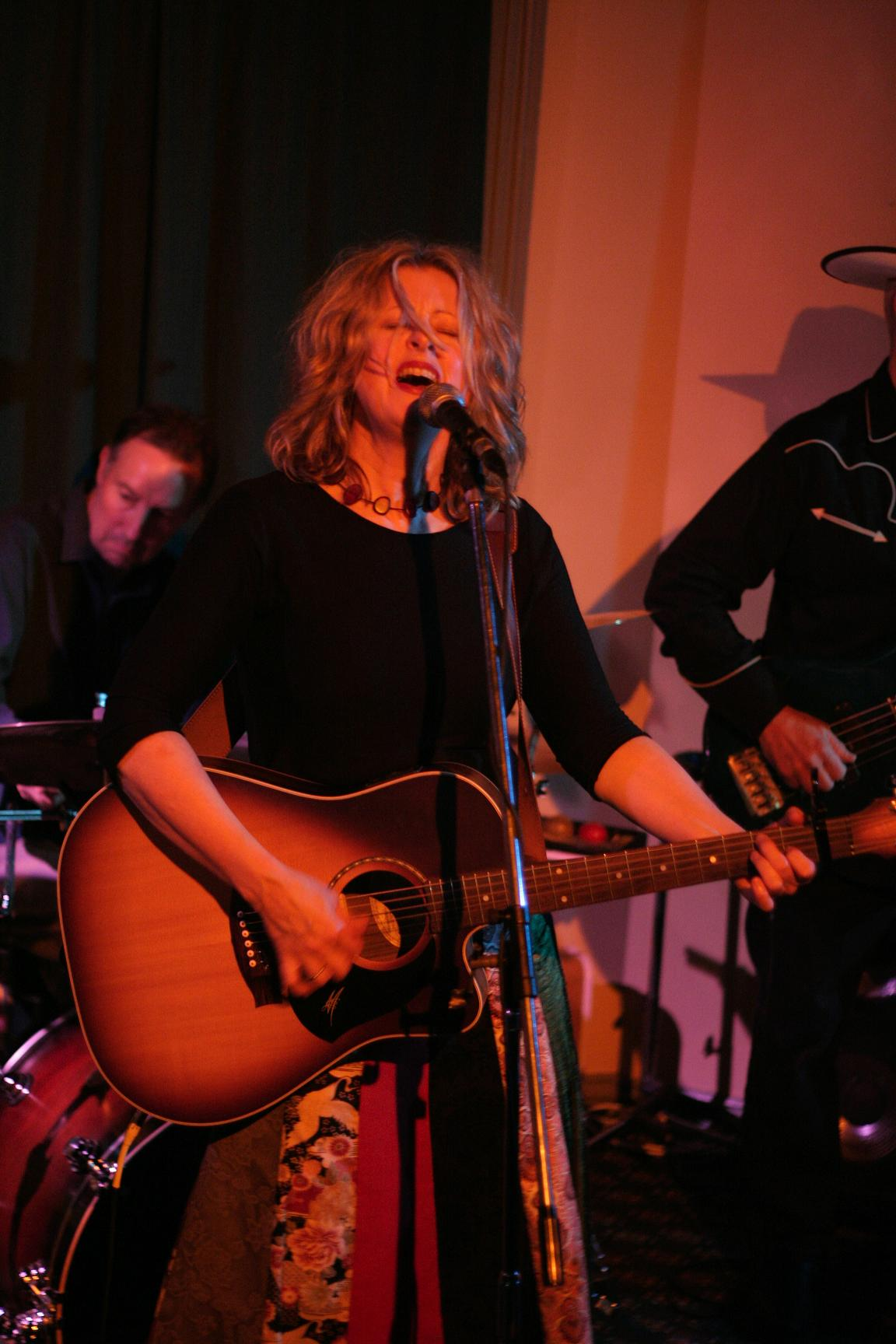

Background information
- Born: 4 June 1955; Melbourne, Victoria, Australia
- Died: 12 January 2018 (aged 62) Melbourne, Victoria, Australia
- Genres: Country, folk rock
- Occupation: Singer-songwriter
- Years active: 1981–2018
- Formerly of: The Hummingbirds
- Website: 1-suziedickinson.yourwebsitespace.com

Suzie Dickinson (4 June 1955 – 12 January 2018) was an Australian musician and songwriter. Originating from Melbourne, she was the lead singer and guitarist in the folk band Banshee, which was critically acclaimed for its original arrangements of American, Irish, English and Australian folk music and lilting, imaginative vocal harmonies. During this time Dickinson won two of Melbourne's "Free Entertainment in the Parks" awards for Most Popular Female Vocalist and Most Popular Female Folk Musician. Banshee was a regular guest on Shirley Strachan's TV show Shirl's Neighbourhood.

Dickinson was then invited to join PC and The Pickups, which was the house band for the Texan Cowboy bars, Spurs. This gave her the opportunity to experience the country music scene, performing nightly around Australia. The band also performed on the festival circuit including the Tamworth Country Music Festival.

Dickinson briefly joined Shane and Marcia Howard as a member of Goanna at the invitation of record producer Trevor Lucas, from Fairport Convention. During her time with the band, Dickinson was included in the recording of "Let the Franklin Flow", a song about the ecological damage to be caused by damming Tasmania's Franklin River for hydroelectricity, and performed at the Stop the Drop concert at the Sidney Myer Music Bowl with Midnight Oil and Redgum.

Dickinson then formed her own alt country band The Cutters and later The Hummingbirds. Band members included guitarist Ross Hannaford, Dave Flett (bass player and Dickinson's husband), Stefan Fidock (drummer), singer songwriter Hugh McDonald, fiddle player John Bone and Matt Green.

As a duo, Dickinson and Flett, toured throughout Australia, with a short stint in the United States. In 2008 and 2009, they provided the music for At the Centre of Light, a play about Australia's first saint, Mary MacKillop.

Dickinson's singing and songwriting have won her two Australian Songwriter's Association Awards for Best Pop Song and Best Country Ballad for her songs "Straight from the Heart" and "We Live Apart". Richard Fields of Melbourne's 3CR radio compared the way that she engaged audiences to Jona Lewie, John Sebastian and Ray Davies. Her music was described by Anne Sydneham of NU Country TV as "more alt country than country....more rocky and rootsy", and Beat Magazine wrote of her "...great, catchy songs that lingered long after the performance had ended".

In late 2008 Dickinson attended a songwriting workshop in Costa Rica hosted by Mary Gauthier and Darrell Scott, which provided the impetus for her first solo album. In 2010, Dickinson embarked on a series of performances around Melbourne – both solo and with a band – promoting her album 19 Steps. When not performing, she taught singing, songwriting, and composition. A proposed second album, titled Blossom, was planned for 2012, but was not released.

Dickinson's daughter Alisha (born 1973) died in 2016. Dickinson died in January 2018 from brain cancer. Her husband Dave Flett died in 2020.
