= Oceania (Goanna album) =

Studio album by Goanna
- Released: April 1985
- Label: Warner-Elektra-Atlantic (WEA)

Goanna chronology
Spirit of Place (1982)	Oceania (1985)	Spirit Returns (1998)

Singles from Oceania
- 1. "Common Ground" Released: November 1984; 2. "Dangerous Dancing" Released: May 1985

Oceania is the second studio album by Australian folk rock and alternative rock band Goanna, released in April 1985. The album peaked at number 29 on the Australian Kent Music Report.

A digitally remastered version of the album was released in 2020, including an additional Rose Bygrave track.

== Track listing ==
No.	Title	Writer(s)	Producer(s)	Length
1.	"Oceania"	Shane Howard	Bill Payne	2:10
2.	"Common Ground"	Howard	Payne	4:19
3.	"Zanzibar"	Howard	Trevor Lucas; Payne	4:05
4.	"Dangerous Dancing"	Howard	Payne; Lucas	4:41
5.	"Every Passing Day"	Howard	Payne	6:33
6.	"Hideaway"	Howard; Bill Payne	Payne	6:00
7.	"Utopia"	Howard	Payne	4:36
8.	"This Time Yr' Runnin"	Howard	Payne; Lucas	3:57
9.	"Some Kinda Magic"	Howard	Payne	4:56
10.	"Jinny"	Howard	Payne	4:25

Goanna

- Roslyn Bygrave – synthesiser, keyboards, backing vocals
- Peter Coughlan – bass guitar
- Marcia Howard – backing vocals, synthesiser, lead vocals (track 4)
- Shane Howard – guitar, synthesiser, lead vocals (except track 4)
- Robert Ross – percussion, drums

Additional musicians

- Joe Creighton – bass guitar (tracks 4, 9)
- Venetta Fields – backing vocals (tracks 4, 9)
- Ross Hannaford – electric guitar (track 4, 5, 8, 9)
- Mal Logan – synth solo (track 8)
- Ian Morrison – backing vocals (tracks 2, 5)
- Alex Pertout – percussion
- Bill Payne – keyboards
- David Platchon – drums (track 6)
- Eddie Rayner – keyboards (track 3)
- Greg "Kenny" Sheehan – drums (tracks 5, 7, 10)
- Sam See – electric and slide guitar (tracks 3, 4, 6, 7, 10)
- Leland Sklar – bass guitar (track 6)

== Charts ==
Chart (1985)	Peak position
Australia (Kent Music Report)	29
