= The Goanna Band =

EP by The Goanna Band
- Released: 1979
- Genre: Pub rock
- Label: EMI Custom Records
- Producer: Broderick Smith

The Goanna Band chronology
The Goanna Band (1979)	Spirit of Place (1982)

The Goanna Band is the four-track debut extended play (EP) by Australian indie pop, folk rock group of the same name, which was later trimmed to Goanna. The EP was released in 1979 by Rose Bygrave on keyboards and vocals, Gary Crothall on drums, Warwick Harwood on lead guitar and vocals, Shane Howard on guitar and lead vocals, Ian Morrison on harmonica and vocals, and Carl Smith on bass guitar. It was produced by Broderick Smith, ex-the Dingoes, and released on the EMI Music sub-label, EMI Custom Records.

== Track listing ==
Side A
No.	Title	Writer(s)	Length
1.	"Zanzibar"	Shane Howard
2.	"On the Platform"	Rose Bygrave

Side B
No.	Title	Writer(s)	Length
1.	"Sometimes"	Howard
2.	"Living on the Razor's Edge"	Howard, Ian Morrison
