= Joe Geia =

Australian musician (born 1959)

- Born: Joseph Benjamin Geia; 1959 (age 66–67); Ingham, Queensland, Australia
- Origin: Adelaide, South Australia, Australia
- Genres: Indigenous; reggae
- Occupations: Musician; composer
- Instruments: Vocals; guitar; didgeridoo
- Years active: 1977–present
- Website: joegeia.com

Joseph Benjamin Geia (born 1959) is an Aboriginal Australian musician of Murri heritage. As a solo artist he has released three albums, Yil Lull (1988), Tribal Journey (1996) and Nunga, Koori and a Murri Love (2005). He has worked with artists, No Fixed Address (1982–83), Shane Howard (1986–88, 1991) and Rebecca Barnard (1990). In 1988 Geia composed the track, "Yil Lull", which has been recorded by other artists, Paul Kelly, Archie Roach, Jimmy Barnes, and the Singers for the Red, Black and Gold, which included Howard, Kelly, Christine Anu, Renée Geyer, and Tiddas.

== Biography ==
Joe Geia was born in 1959 in Ingham, Queensland and grew up as a member of the Murri peoples. His father, Albert Geia, was a cane cutter and Indigenous elder, who was one of the leaders of the Palm Island strike of 1957. As a result, Albert, and other leaders, were banned from the island.

Geia is a composer, guitarist, singer and didgeridoo player and has been recognised as one of the most influential figures in the development of contemporary Indigenous music. In the late 1970s he was a member of a Kuku Yalanji dance troupe. He moved to Adelaide to attend the Centre for Aboriginal Studies in Music (CASM) at the University of Adelaide.

While at CASM he joined the Aboriginal band, No Fixed Address, in 1982 providing vocals, percussion and didgeridoo. As a member of the group he was recorded on their studio album, From My Eyes (August 1982). Geia left in mid-1983 to live in Sydney where he formed a reggae band, Nya Nunga.

In 1985 he disbanded Nya Nunga and relocated to Melbourne where he formed Prince Nayh and the Slaves of Sin with Peter Camm on guitar, Chris Coyne on saxophone, Barry Denik on bass guitar, Rob Dixon on keyboards, Steve Hewitt on trumpet, Des McKenna on drums (ex-Lavidia Sage), John Petros on guitar, and Koori Brother William on vocals. In the following year they toured South Australia and Northern Territory. During that year Geia joined Shane Howard and Friends on vocals and guitar alongside Shane Howard on lead vocals (ex-Goanna) and Howard's former bandmates, Marcia Howard (his sister) on backing vocals, Simon Curphy on guitar, Joe Imbrol on bass guitar and Dave Stewart on drums. Geia, Shane, Marcia and Curphy continued with the Shane Howard Band from 1987 to 1988. Also in 1987 Geia was appointed as a cultural officer for the Aboriginal Advancement League of Victoria where he would, "visit local schools to play didgeridoo, teach dance and demonstrate traditional cooking."

Geia was granted $90,000 by the Australia Council for the Arts to fund his first solo album, Yil Lull, which was released in 1988 (Australia's bicentennial year), on the Only Gammin' label. It achieved an unprecedented level of critical and commercial success for an Aboriginal performer. The council also sponsored his six-month national Uncle Willie Tour of 1988. and reached a wide audience. The album was considered vitally important among Aboriginal people, and was well-timed to express a growing sense of pride in culture and identity, and hope for the political fight for land rights.

Geia has been cited as an important influence by almost every Aboriginal musician to achieve prominence since that time. He has worked with many other Australian musicians including a long-term close relationship with ARIA award-winning Tasmanian band Wild Pumpkins at Midnight, who often appeared as his backing band in various combinations. In 1995 Geia toured Europe with members of Wild Pumpkins under the name Joe Geia and the Black Snake Orchestra. They performed in Germany, The Netherlands, Switzerland and Belgium. In 1996 he was a guest vocalist on the song "Pretty Valley," based on the oral history of a massacre of tribal people in New South Wales. Produced by Tony Cohen, it featured on the Wild Pumpkins' album Sad Trees, released by Way Over There, 1996. Wild Pumpkins guitarist Nick Larkins has been a regular member of Geia's live band since 1995, and contributed to his most recent album.

Geia released a second album, Tribal Journey, in 1996, through Larrikin/Festival records. He has also contributed songs to other projects and worked as a session musician for other bands. His third album Nunga, Koori and a Murri Love was released by Across The Borders, Melbourne, in December 2005. Produced by former bandmate, Shane Howard, the album was made with a cast of well-known Australian support musicians. These include Kerryn Tolhurst (The Dingoes), Ross Hannaford (Daddy Cool), Bob Sedergreen, Nick Larkins, Russell Smith, Ricardo Idago, Rebecca Barnard, Shelley Scown and many more.

Stylistically Geia's songs fit the category of roots music and range from simple Pacific songs to reggae, rock and funk. The songs are written in Aboriginal language and English, and touch on universal themes as well as issues of Aboriginal Australia, although not in an overtly political way. There is plenty of irony and black humour in some of the more recent songs like "Gimme a Mercedes" and "Good To See Ya."

== Discography ==
=== Albums ===
List of albums, with selected details
Title	Details
Yil Lull	Released: 1988; Format: LP, CS, CD; Label: Gammin Records
Tribal Journey	Released: 1996; Format: CD; Label: Larrikin/Festival
Nunga, Koori & Murri Love	Released: 2005; Format: CD; Label: Across The Borders
