= Razor's Edge (Goanna song) =

Single by Goanna

from the album Spirit of Place
- Released: March 1983
- Length: 4:06
- Label: WEA
- Songwriters: Ian Morrison, Shane Howard
- Producer: Trevor Lucas

Goanna singles chronology
"Solid Rock" (1982)	"Razor's Edge" (1983)	"Let the Franklin Flow" (1983)

Music video
- "Razor's Edge" on YouTube

"Razor's Edge" is a song written by Ian Morrison and Shane Howard and recorded by Australian band Goanna. The song was released in March 1983, as the second and final single from the band's debut studio album, Spirit of Place. "Razor's Edge" peaked at number 36 on the Australian Kent Music Report.

== Track listing ==
7" WEA (7-259963)

Side A: "Razor's Edge" - 4:06
Side B: "On the Platform" - 4:59

== Charts ==
Chart (1983)	Peak position
Australia (Kent Music Report)	36

== Cover versions ==
- In 2018, The Screaming Jets covered the song on their album Gotcha Covered.
