= Marcia Howard =

Marcia Howard may refer to:

- Marcia Howard (musician), Australian musician
- Marcia Morales Howard, American judge
