= Stop The Drop =

Australian benefit concert in 1983

Stop The Drop was an Australian benefit concert held at the Sidney Myer Music Bowl in Melbourne on 13 February 1983, in aid of the community organisation, People For Nuclear Disarmament (PND). Australian bands Midnight Oil, INXS, Goanna and Redgum, together with Colin Hay (of Men at Work) performed.

== History ==
People For Nuclear Disarmament (PND) was formed in 1981 as a community organisation, which campaigned for nuclear disarmament, against United States Army bases in Australia and against uranium mining (see anti-nuclear movement in Australia). They sponsored a public meeting, Act for Survival, at the Assembly Hall, Melbourne, featuring Nobel Laureate Patrick White on 21 October 1981 as their first major activity. It was followed by a rally held on 4 April 1982, which attracted 40,000 people.

PND member Kevin Fewster, a tutor in Australian History at Monash University, met with Midnight Oil's singer Peter Garrett to discuss the possibility of holding a rock concert to support PND. The plans began in December 1982, and received support from the music industry. The benefit concert was held at the Sidney Myer Music Bowl, Melbourne on 13 February 1983. Performers were Midnight Oil, INXS, Goanna, Redgum and Colin Hay (of Men at Work).

Between 12,000 and 15,000 attended the concert, with hundreds more listening from outside the venue. Between songs, guests discussed nuclear disarmament issues, and the concert programme provided further information about nuclear disarmament and advertised a march held by PND on 27 March. The concert raised $30,000, with funds split between PND and costs associated with filming the event.

At the concert, members of Goanna and Redgum recorded a live version of "Let the Franklin Flow", a song protesting proposed damming of Tasmania's Franklin River written by Goanna's Shane Howard. It was the song's first public performance and was produced by Trevor Lucas. It was released as a single in April 1983, credited to Gordon Franklin and the Wilderness Ensemble. It reached number 15 on the Australian Kent Music Report in May.

Network Ten later televised the concert, which was simulcast nationally on radio by EON FM. The organisers of the concert and telecast received the United Nations Association of Australia's Media Peace Prize Award in October 1983, and a video recording of the concert was released on VHS and later DVD as Stop the Drop: a Concert for Nuclear Disarmament, directed by Bernie Cannon and produced by Andrew McVitty.

At the time, Network Ten was criticised for broadcasting the concert on a Thursday night at 10:30pm, which was seen as inconvenient for their target audience. The programme was also cut down from the original 330 minute concert, to 90 minutes for TV.

== Further concerts ==
A second Stop The Drop concert was held on 8 April 1984 with performances by Split Enz, Goanna, Jo Jo Zep & the Falcons, Stephen Cummings, and I'm Talking, with special guests Los Trios Ringbarkus, Sigrid Thornton, Jane Clifton, Maggie Kirkpatrick, and The Hot Bagels.

A separate concert, Stop The Drop - Disarm Now! was held on 5 February, with Midnight Oil, Mental as Anything, Spy vs Spy, and Invisible Mendez. This concert raised money for anti-nuclear groups in South Australia, with over 8,000 people attending.

Also in 1984 Garrett ran for a New South Wales seat in the Australian Senate for the Nuclear Disarmament Party but was not elected, he received 9.6% of votes compared with the needed 12.5% votes. This was his first attempt at entering politics.

A compilation album featuring artists from the concerts was released in 1985, Stop the Drop But Don't Stop the Bop. A Stop The Drop concert planned for Canberra in 1985 was cancelled.

== Collections ==
Items relating to the concert are held in various collections around Australia. Including Australian Performing Arts Collection, Powerhouse Museum, Museums Victoria, State Library Victoria, and Australian Centre for the Moving Image.
