= Solid Rock (Goanna song) =

1982 single by Goanna

Single by Goanna

from the album Spirit of Place
- Released: 6 September 1982
- Genre: Rock
- Length: 4:28
- Label: WEA Records
- Songwriter: Shane Howard
- Producer: Trevor Lucas

Goanna singles chronology
"Solid Rock" (1982)	"Razor's Edge" (1983)

"Solid Rock" is a song written by Shane Howard and recorded by Australian rock band Goanna. The song deals with issues of land rights for Indigenous Australians and was released in September 1982 as the lead single from the band's debut studio album, Spirit of Place. "Solid Rock" peaked at number 3 on the Australian Kent Music Report.

At the 1982 Countdown Music and Video Awards, "Solid Rock" won Best Debut Single.

In January 2018, as part of Triple M's "Ozzest 100", the 'most Australian' songs of all time, "Solid Rock" was ranked number 13. In 2025, the song placed 47 in the Triple J Hottest 100 of Australian Songs.

In 2021, MTV Classic ranked the song 10th during their special Top 100 Big in the 80s countdown.

== Background and release ==
According to Howard, the inspiration came on a ten-day camping trip at Uluru during 1980 where he had a "spiritual awakening" which brought "the fire in the belly" to the surface over injustices to Australia’s indigenous peoples. Howard said "I realised that this country that I grew up in, that I thought was my country, wasn't. I had to reassess my whole relationship with the land and the landscape, and understand that we had come from somewhere else, and we had dis-empowered a whole race of people when we arrived."

WEA were reluctant to release it as a single and Howard initially had reservations about whether commercial radio would play it because of its politically sensitive theme but Howard insisted on its release to make a statement about the European settlement of Australia. The song was released in September 1982.

Australian musicologist, Ian McFarlane, described it as "a damning indictment of the European settlement of Australia."

== Track listing ==
7" WEA Records (100223)

Side A: "Solid Rock" – 4:28
Side B: "Four Weeks Gone" – 5:42

== Charts ==
=== Weekly charts ===
Weekly chart performance for "Solid Rock"
Chart (1982/83)	Peak position
Australia (Kent Music Report)	3
US Billboard Hot 100	71

=== Year-end charts ===
Year-end chart performance for "Solid Rock"
Chart (1982)	Position
Australia (Kent Music Report)	57
Chart (1983)	Position
Australia (Kent Music Report)	56

== Cover versions ==
- In 1994, Shane Howard recorded the song on his album Live in Ireland, Australia and New Zealand.
- In 2009, Street Warriors featuring Shannon Noll released a version of "Solid Rock"
- In 2011, heavy metal band Darker Half covered the song on their album Desensitized.
- In 2014 Heavy Metal band Dead Kelly covered Solid Rock on their YouTube Channel
- In 2016, Scott Darlow featuring Shane Howard released a version of "Solid Rock"
- In 2017, Jessica Mauboy covered the song on her album The Secret Daughter Season Two: Songs from the Original 7 Series.
- in 2017 Robbie Miller created a slow acoustic version.
- In 2020, The Waifs, John Butler, Jordi Davieson, Carla Geneve performed a cover of "Solid Rock" during the Fire Aid concert, a benefit performance for the people affected by the 2020 bushfires.
- Also in 2020, Amanda Palmer covered the song on Forty-Five Degrees: Bushfire Flash Record, a benefit release supporting the Firestick Alliance.
- in 2023 WildHeart made a heavy metal cover of Solid Rock in a double song album with another song Sacred Ground somewhat of a spin off of Solid Rock
