= Dan Tuffy =

Australian-born musician

Dan Tuffy is an Australian-born musician, he was bass guitarist and vocalist for Tasmanian band, Wild Pumpkins at Midnight from 1984. The band relocated to Melbourne in 1987, then to London in 1990 and subsequently to the Netherlands. Tuffy later formed the folk/blues band Big Low which performed his semi-autobiographical songs and stories and, as from 2007, he was a resident of The Netherlands.

== Biography ==
=== Early years ===
Tuffy was born and raised on the north coast of New South Wales, Australia, where he worked on a cattle station and played in a handful of local country bands as a teenager before leaving the land and heading south to Tasmania to study botany. In 1985 he played some of the teenage tunes he had written about birds and fish to members of Wild Pumpkins at Midnight and they asked him to join. Record releases and international tours followed as the 'Pumpkins' relocated first to Melbourne, then London and later to Amsterdam, The Netherlands in a career that spanned 13 years, 9 albums and tours of Europe including UK, Baltic states and Eastern Europe.

=== Later years ===
As from 2007, Tuffy lived in The Netherlands with his wife and two children. He recruited two multi-instrumentalists, Michiel Hollanders and Marc Constandse, for Big Low. Tuffy established the Smoked Recordings label including a studio. He produced two Big Low albums and 2 EPs, which have received praise in Europe and were due to be released in Australia. He has produced albums for other artists and is the manager/bass player of a Balkan music outfit, Parne Gadje, which has recorded three albums and signed a European deal with Rough Trade.
