= This Machine Is Made of People =

Studio album by Wild Pumpkins at Midnight
- Released: August 1989
- Recorded: December 1988
- Studio: Richmond, The Studios
- Label: Mighty Boy
- Producer: Chris Thompson, Wild Pumpkins at Midnight

Wild Pumpkins at Midnight chronology
Living (1989)	This Machine Is Made of People (1989)	Little Victories (1990)

This Machine Is Made of People is a studio album by Australian blues and roots rock band Wild Pumpkins at Midnight. The album was released in August 1989. At the ARIA Music Awards of 1990, the album won the ARIA Award for Best Independent Release.

== Track listing ==
Side A

1. "Retrenchment Town"
2. "Get On That Train"
3. "Strange Disease"
4. "Counting the Pennies"

Side C

1. "Only Five Days Until The Weekend"
2. "The Gaiety"
3. "This Machine Is Made of People"
