= Nick Larkins =

Australian rock musician

Nick Larkins is an Australian rock musician who has played with various Australian acts, and solo. Nick was born in London but raised in Hobart, Tasmania. Larkins has been highly nomadic for much of his career. He has usually been based in the city of Melbourne, known as the live music capital of Australia, but has also lived and worked in Europe several times.

== Career overview ==
As a teenager Nick Larkins fronted some of Tasmania's pioneering punk bands, most notably REJECT, who smashed at least one guitar at every show, replacing the guitar solo with the guitar-smashing solo. He has also performed solo and with the following acts:

- Nick Larkins (1987–) Singer-songwriter.
- Nobody (1989–1991) Electric guitar, vocal.
- Checkerboard Lounge Blues Band (1990) Bass guitar.
- Velvet Hammer (1992–1993) Bass guitar, backing vocals.
- Joe Geia (1993–2003) Electric guitar, backing vocals, recording engineer.
- Stories And Songs of the People (1999, 2000, 2010) Electric guitar, co-producer/engineer.
- Richard Gillard and House of Circles (1998–2006) Electric and acoustic bass guitar, backing vocals, electric guitar.
- The Durga Babies (2001–2006) Electric guitar, Hammond organ, theremin, backing vocals, co-recording engineer.
- Wild Pumpkins at Midnight (1984, 1993–1998) Guitars, vocals, bass guitar, Hammond organ, harmonica, sitar, theremin, co-engineer/producer.
- Dan Rumour Band (2005–2007) Dan Rumour and The Drift (2007– ) Hammond organ, guitar, co-engineer/producer.
- Nick Larkins & The Bones (2005–2016) Vocal, guitars, theremin.
- Monique Brumby (2010–2016) Guitars, bass, recording engineer, co-producer.
- The Grenadines/The Deans (2005– ) Hammond organ, bass, recording engineer, producer.
- Hurrican Hearn (2016 – ) Guitar.
- EchoZilla (2016 – ) Bass VI, Theremin, Guitar, co-engineer/producer.

== Wild Pumpkins at Midnight and Europe ==
In 1993 Nick Larkins re-joined Wild Pumpkins at Midnight and moved to The Netherlands. Until the end of 1998 Wild Pumpkins were based in the Netherlands, returning to Australia for brief periods, touring and releasing 6 CDs in Australia, Europe and Brazil. Roughly half their recorded output was produced with award winning studio engineer Tony Cohen. (Birthday Party, Nick Cave, The Beasts of Bourbon, The Cruel Sea, Hunters & Collectors). WPAM albums and concerts featured guest appearances by other influential Australian musicians including Chris Wilson, members of Weddings Parties Anything, Joe Geia and Tiddas. Larkins and other members of WPAM performed with Aboriginal songwriter Joe Geia on and off for years. In 1995 Larkins and Dan Tuffy from WPAM toured Europe with Geia for several months during a break in WPAM commitments. On that tour they performed live on German radio station WDR to a Friday night drive-time audience of over 3 million listeners. With Wild Pumpkins Nick performed at the prestigious Montreaux Jazz Festival (Switzerland); shared billing with Santana, Björk, Nick Cave, Dirty Three, Tricky, Rage Against the Machine, Porno 4 Pyros, Mick Taylor (Rolling Stones), David Crosby (Crosby, Stills & Nash), Link Wray and others. They toured extensively in former Eastern Bloc countries, including the Former Yugoslavia in 1994 during the war, and also played festivals and clubs all over Europe. Larkins also lived and performed in Czech Republic in 1997.

== Return to Melbourne ==
Wild Pumpkins At Midnight ended as a band at the close of the 1998 European tour. In 1999 and 2000 Larkins performed with Native American, Tibetan and Australian Aboriginal musicians on a project called 'Stories And Songs'. An album was released in 2000 and two documentary films, shown on the ABC television show Message Stick, and at the various film festivals. Since 2000 Larkins has appeared on Australian television series The Secret Life of Us, the 2006 Melbourne Music documentary Sticky Carpet, and the Australian surf music documentary/album 'Delightful Rain'. Larkins lived in Barcelona, Spain, in 2004, performing solo, and also in the UK. He returned to Melbourne at the end of that year and from early 2005 began performing with his own band 'Nick Larkins and The Bones'. From early 2005 Nick also played hammond organ and guitar for Cruel Sea guitarist Dan Rumour, in the Dan Rumour Band. The instrumental combo changed its name to Dan Rumour & The Drift in 2007 with the release of their first, self-titled, album. Dan Rumour & The Drift also included Cruel Sea drummer Jim Elliot and fellow ex-WPAM member Michael Turner on bass guitar. Larkins and Rumour co-produced and mixed the band's first album.

From late 2010 until 2016 Larkins performed with fellow Tasmanian musician Monique Brumby as a guitarist, bass player, and engineer on her self-titled album released in 2014. In 2011 Larkins began working as a songwriter-producer with Melbourne musician Catherine Sheahan on a project called 'twentyfive'. twentyfive aimed to write, record and release a new song every two weeks, with twenty five different singers primarily from the Melbourne independent band scene. Their studio was located in a restored 1957 train carriage called the Hobsons Bay, in Melbourne's historic Newport Rail Workshop, where the train was originally built. The site is also the home of Melbourne's Railway Museum operated by the Australian Railway Historical Society. The project ran out of funding before it was complete, but it was filmed by documentary crew F-Reel and director Fiona Cochrane. The documentary film was released in 2016 and toured international film festivals, picking up several awards.

From 2005 Larkins played as a guest musician on Hammond Organ for Indigenous lead Melbourne band The Grenadines, appearing on their first album 'Story of Woe'. In 2008 he became their bass player and in 2011 the band changed their name to The Deans, focusing on a modern soul sound, and released a self titled album in 2012 recorded and produced by Larkins. In 2014 the band released a second self titled album, also recorded and produced by Larkins, for which they won The Age/Music Victoria Best Indigenous Act award 2014. The Deans continue to perform regularly at festivals and clubs with Larkins on bass and producing their releases. In 2016 Larkins joined blues band Hurricane Hearn on electric guitar. Also in 2016 Larkins formed an improvised instrumental soundtrack band with electric violin and mandolin player Jodi Moore from Dirty Lucy and Nick Larkins & The Bones. Larkins plays theremin, bass VI and electric guitars in the band. In 2017 EchoZilla released their first 3 albums as 24 instrumental tracks available on YouTube.

== Live and studio engineer ==
Wild Pumpkins At Midnight co-produced their own recordings, even when working with experienced producers like Tony Cohen. Often the whole band would be involved in mixing a song, with three or four people working the mixing desk at the same time. Each member of the band learnt recording skills and techniques in this way. Larkins began mixing live sound for friends' bands in Melbourne around 1999 and has since worked as a live and studio engineer for many acts and projects. These include: Dan Rumour and The Drift, Dandelion Wine, Duckdive, Wons P Phreeley, Even, Catnip, Renee Geyer (studio assistant), Paul Kelly, Chris Wilson, Lunars, The Winter Migration, Autumn Gray, Man Bites God, James Hazelden, I Dream in Transit, Slow Human Escape, The Triangles, Digger and The Pussycats, Immigrant Union, Brillig, The Shambelles, Stories and Songs of The People, Joe Geia, Big Low (Netherlands), Monique Brumby, twentyfive.

== Discography ==
- 1990 Nick Stuff, Nick Larkins guitar and vocals, audio tape sold at gigs.
- 1992 Keith Richards Is My Dad, Nick Larkins and The Government, independent music video, played on RAGE, ABC TV, and The Noise, SBS TV, Australia.
- 1993. Taedium Vitae, Velvet Hammer, Siren Records (Aust.), Larkins – bass guitar.
- 1993. Going Sick, Wild Pumpkins At Midnight, Produced by Tony Cohen. Survival Records (Aust.), Larkins – electric guitars & hammond organ.
- 1995. Lo-Fi Lucy’s Mobile Temple, WPAM, W.O.T. records (Aust.), Larkins – guitars, bass guitar, hammond organ, vocals, co-engineer.
- 1996. Secret of The Sad Trees WPAM, prod. Tony Cohen. W.O.T. (Aust.), Larkins – guitars, bass guitar, hammond organ.
- 1996. Song Xavier on compilation East Timor benefit CD Love From A Short Distance, Shock Records (Aust.), also featuring Bono, Yothu Yindi, Billy Bragg, Silverchair, Screaming Jets, Mavis’s.
- 1996–97. Sad Trees, WPAM, prod. Tony Cohen and WPAM. Hot Records UK, (Europe and Aust. re-release)
- 1997. Small-Head Paul, Hip-Hop E.P., MouseMaster, Czech. Larkins co-writer, co-producer.
- 1998. Instant Ocean, WPAM, Rocks Records, Euro. Larkins – guitars, bass, hammond organ, harmonica, theremin, piano, sitar, tamboura, vocals, co-engineer, co-producer.
- 1999 Music As Medicine, Stories & Songs Of the People, Stories & Songs. Larkins – guitars, hammond organ, vocals, engineer and co-producer.
- 2000 Stories & Songs of The People – They Came For Gathering, documentary film. F-Reel, Aust.
- 2000 Oral Pleasure, (Radio only Single) NICK, Beatnik Records, Aust. & Germany. Larkins solo.
- 2002 Audioweave, Disasterware. Disasterware, Aust. Larkins – sitar.
- 2002 You Talking To Me, Various artists. PLACEBO Aust.
- 2002 Swell.1, House Of Circles, prod. Kerryn Tolhurst and Tony Cohen, Laughing Outlaw Records, Aust. Larkins – electric and upright bass, guitars, vocals.
- 2002 The Grey Room, Sara Mitchell. MGM, Aust. Larkins – guitar.
- 2003 Love Comes, The Durga Babies. Rocks Records, Aust. Larkins – guitar, hammond organ, co-engineer.
- 2004 Crapola, Nick Larkins. Beatnik Records. Released on iTunes worldwide August 2007. Larkins solo, all instruments and production.
- 2005 Nunga, Koori & A Murri Love, Joe Geia. Across The Borders, Aust. Larkins – electric guitar, co-engineer.
- 2006 Delightful Rain, CD/DVD (documentary film) Various Artists, Dan Rumour Band. Bombora, Aust.
- 2007 Dan Rumour and The Drift, Dan Rumour and The Drift. Bombora, Aust. Larkins – hammond organ, guitar, bass, engineer, co-producer.
- 2008 Stories For Another Day, Duckdive, Laughing Outlaw Records, Aust. Mixed by Larkins.
- 2009 Nick Larkins & The Bones, self-titled album. Independent release on iTunes. Larkins – guitar, vocals, engineer, producer.
- 2011 Underground, (single) Monique Brumby. Co-produced with Brumby.
- 2011 Railyard Songs, The Winter Migration. Produced by Larkins.
- 2011 Lunars, Lunars. Produced by Larkins.
- 2011 twentyfive, series of 11 singles with different singers, released on iTunes. Co-produced with Catherine Sheeahan. Larkins – guitars, bass, keys, toy instruments.
- 2012 The Deans, self-titled album, independent release on iTunes. Bass, hammond organ, backing vocals, engineered, mixed and produced by Larkins.
- 2012 Constant Killer, self-titled EP, independent release, engineered and produced by Larkins and M. Brumby.
- 2013 Rebuild The Universe, Winter Migration. Engineered and produced by Larkins, with M. Brumby.
- 2014 Monique Brumby, self-titled album. Larkins co-engineered, co-produced with M. Brumby. Larkins – guitars, bass, keys.
- 2014 Foam Covered Chairs / We'll Never Give Your Heart Away, Autumn Gray, split single, mixed by Larkins.
- 2014 The Deans Re-mix, The Deans. Independent release, iTunes. Engineered and produced by Larkins. Larkins – bass guitar.
- 2015 Live At The Toff In Town, Autumn Gray. Mixed and produced by Larkins.
- 2015 The Deans, The Deans. Second self-titled album, independent release iTunes. Larkins – bass, hammond organ, engineer, producer.
- 2016 Unity EP, The Deans. Independent release iTunes. Larkins – bass, engineer, producer.
- 2017 EchoZilla, 24 tracks, independent release, Youtube. Larkins – theremin, bass VI, guitar, co-engineer, co-producer.
