= Graham Davidge =

Australian musician

- Occupation: Musician
- Instruments: Guitars (electric guitar, acoustic guitar, slide guitar); mandolin; flute; harmonica; vocals
- Formerly of: W.G. Berg, Nostra Damus, Syperman, Super Lemon, Bite, Steven Foster Band, Russell Royden Band, Johnny Chester, Little River Band, Tidewater, The Sultan Brothers, Stephen Foster Band, Goanna, Reverend Blues and The Blues Messengers, Tinsley Waterhouse Band

Graham Davidge is an Australian musician. He has played with Little River Band (1975), Tidewater (1976), Goanna (1982–83) and numerous other Australian bands.

Davidge was chosen as the original lead guitarist for Little River Band. He played on the band's first recording in 1975, a cover of The Everly Brothers song "When Will I Be Loved". Linda Ronstadt released her version of the song around the same time, and the Little River Band version was not released. Davidge left the band shortly thereafter, to be replaced by Ric Formosa.

"When Will I Be Loved" featuring Graham Davidge was subsequently released on the Little River Band rarities album Too Late to Load in 1988, on their 1995 compilation album Reminiscing: The 20th Anniversary Collection and as a single in 1989 to promote Too Late to Load.

Davidge went to play with Goanna in 1982–1983, appearing on the album Spirit of Place.
