= Wild Pumpkins at Midnight =

Australian blues, rock band

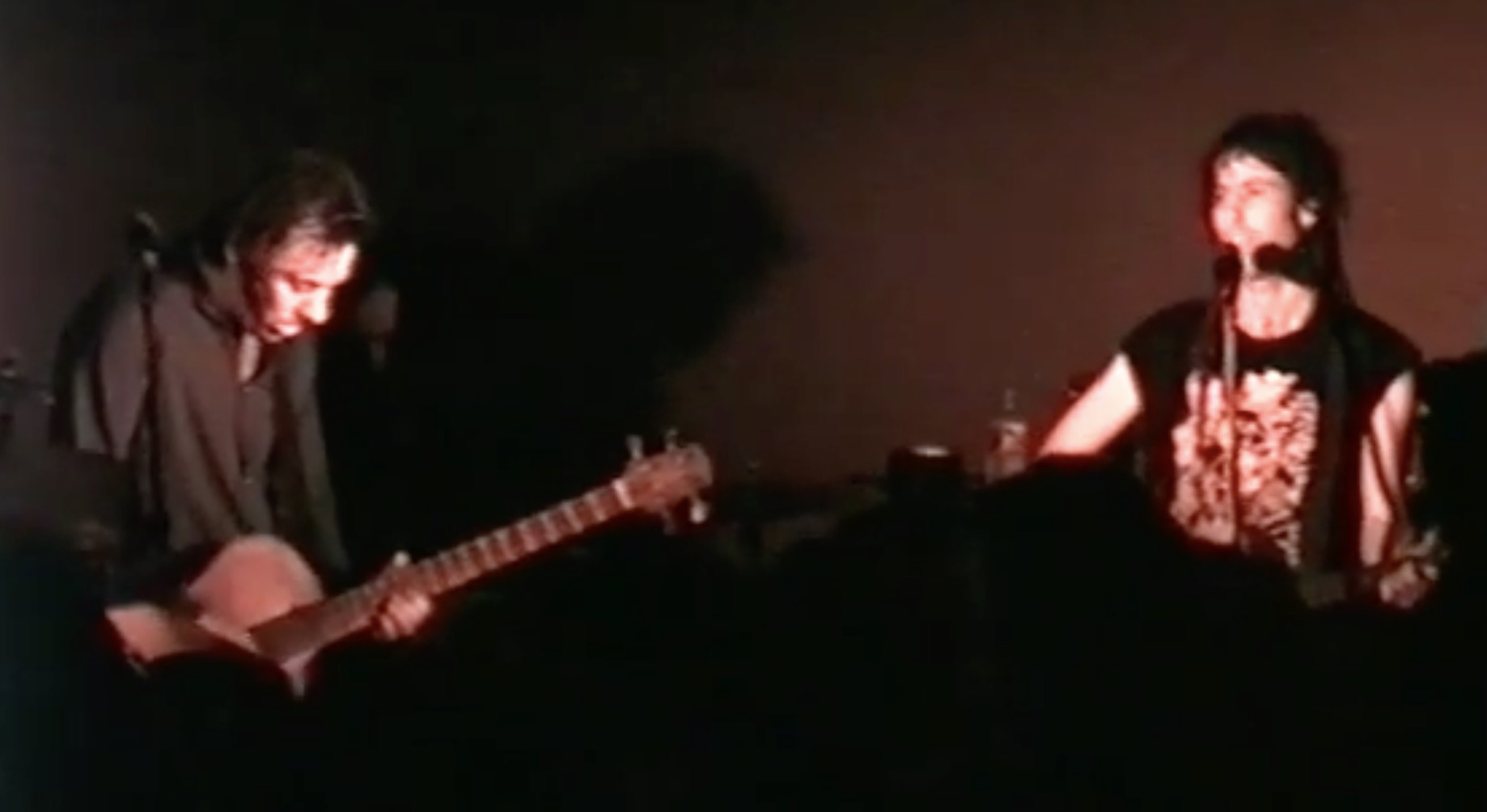
- Dan Tuffy (left) and Michael Turner of Wild Pumpkins at Midnight, Punters Club, Fitzroy, 1993.

Background information
- Origin: Hobart, Tasmania, Australia
- Genres: Blues, roots rock
- Years active: 1984–1998
- Labels: WPAM, Dex, Major, Mighty Boy, MDS, Current, Way Over There, Hot
- Past members: Debra Manskey; Dan Tuffy; Michael Turner; Ashley Davies; Greg Hynes; Nick Larkins

Wild Pumpkins at Midnight (sometimes referred to as WPAM) were an Australian blues, roots rock band which formed in Hobart, Tasmania in 1984, by Debra Manskey on lead vocals and guitar, Dan Tuffy on bass guitar and vocals and Michael Turner on guitar and vocals. They relocated to Melbourne in 1987. At the 1990 ARIA Music Awards they won Best Independent Release for their album, This Machine Is Made of People (1989). Manskey left in early 1990 and Ashley Davies joined on drums, before the group relocated to London in June. They subsequently shifted to the Netherlands in 1993, Davies returned to Australia and was replaced by Greg Hynes and added Nick Larkins on guitar. The band visited Australia for touring and recording in late 1995 and again in 1997, but were based in Europe. They toured both Europe and Australia, including a spot on the 1996 Big Day Out and released nine albums via various labels before disbanding in 1998.

== History ==
=== Formation and early years ===
In 1984, Tasmanians, Debra Manskey on lead vocals and guitar and Michael Turner on vocals and guitar joined with New South Wales-born Dan Tuffy on bass guitar and vocals to form Wild Pumpkins at Midnight as a semi-acoustic blues, roots rock. The band emerged within Tasmania's post-Franklin River campaign folk-protest movement of the mid-1980s, performing regularly at the Dog House Hotel in Hobart. The trio had evolved from Tintagel's Lament, a trio comprising Manskey, Michael McDougall and Ashley Vincent Hazelwood III. They asked Turner to join on double bass. After McDougall and Hazelwood left, Turner suggested Tuffy, who subsequently joined the trio, which were renamed Wild Pumpkins at Midnight.

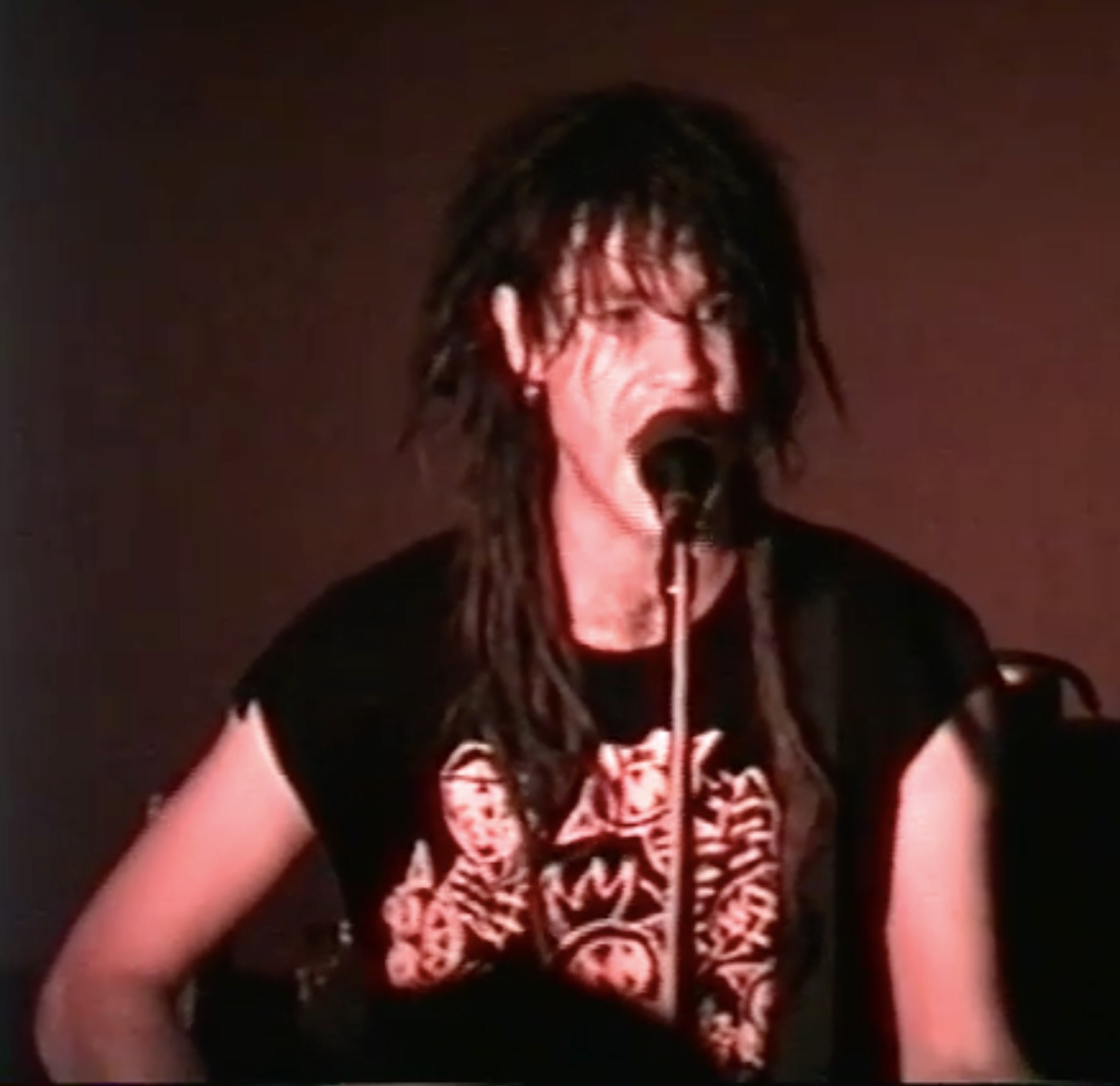
Turner, Punters Club, Fitzroy, 1993.

The trio released their debut single, "Birth of a Nation" (1987) on WPAM, it was followed in March by the limited issue 10-track cassette, Scenesville on Dex. They relocated to Melbourne and signed with Major Records in 1987 and released, Wild Pumpkins at Midnight, a five-track extended play (EP) in 1988, which was produced by Tony Cohen. After signing with Sydney-based label, Mighty Boy, they released "Watermelon Patch" as a single in March 1989 followed by two albums Living in April 1989 and This Machine Is Made of People in August. In 1990, at the Australian Recording Industry Association (ARIA) Music Awards, they won Best Independent Release for This Machine Is Made of People. This Machine Is Made of People had been developed as part of a songwriting and community arts project funded by the Australian Council of Trade Unions (ACTU). The initiative reconnected the union movement with its songwriting heritage. Turner and Tuffy visited workplaces across Tasmania, including mines in Zeehan, hospitals, government centres and zinc works, collaborating with workers and artists to develop material reflecting working conditions. Former Tasmanian Premier Jim Bacon, an ex-Australian Workers Union secretary, supported the project.

Little Victories was released in 1990, Manskey left prior to the band relocating to London in June with new drummer, Ashley Davies. Prior to relocating to London, the band spent three months in Brisbane, Queensland, working with street-involved youth and children in juvenile detention, developing songs collaboratively with participants. Although funding limitations prevented a formal release, select songs were released on later WIld Pumpkins records.

=== London and Amsterdam ===
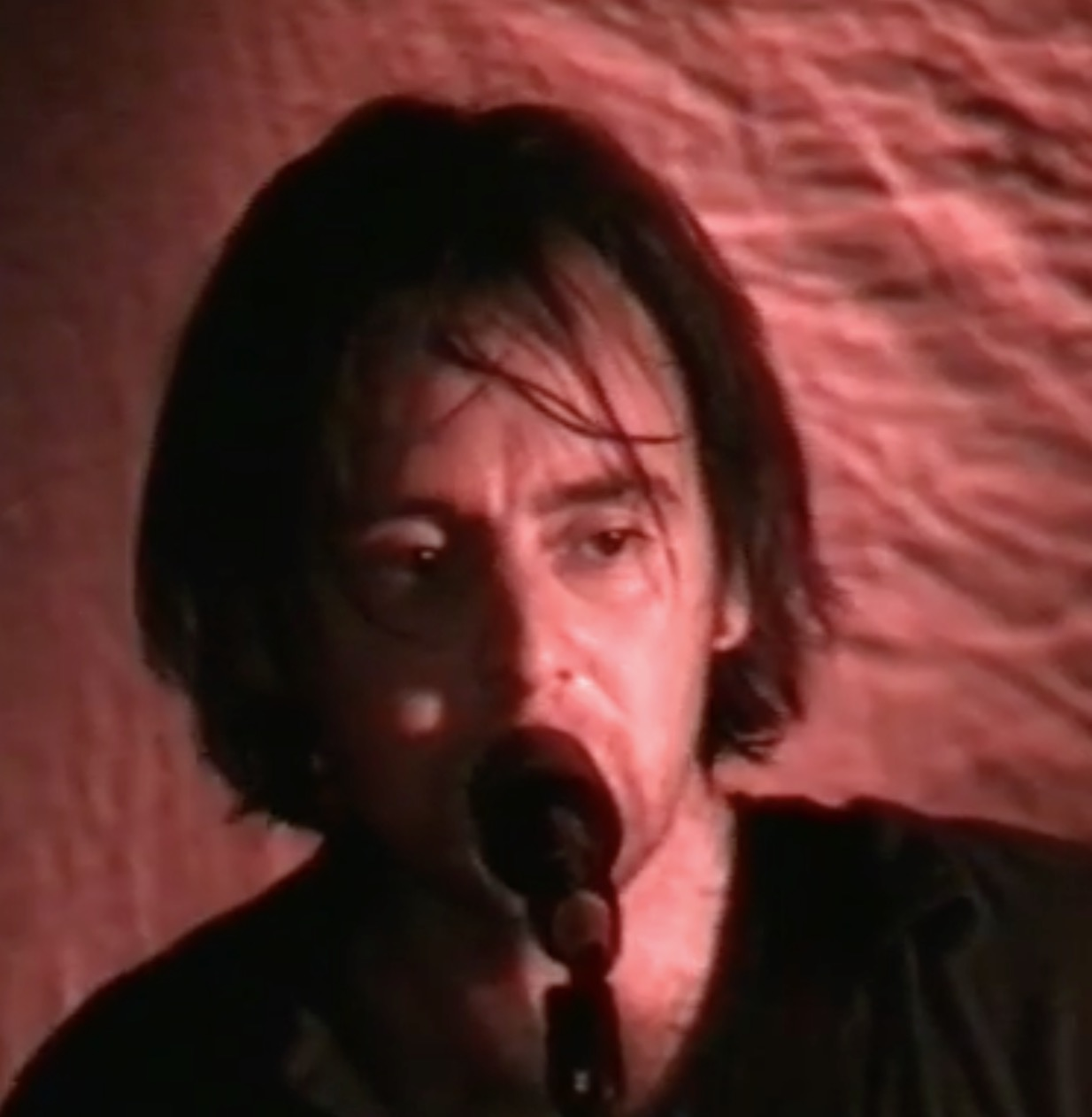
Tuffy, Punters Club, Fitzroy, 1993.

Wild Pumpkins at Midnight had relocated to London by June 1990 and subsequently moved to Amsterdam, Netherlands and then were based in the village of Wageningen. Their first European release was a four-track CD EP, Sending a Vampire on MDS in October 1992 and was followed by albums, Strangeways (Current/MDS, April 1993) and Going Sick (Current/MDS, April 1994) – the latter produced by Cohen. In 1993, Davies had returned to Australia and was replaced by Greg Hynes and guitarist Nick Larkins had joined. From their base in Wageningen they toured a dozen European countries, including several tours to former Eastern Bloc states including Czech Republic, Slovak Republic, Hungary and Poland. They also performed in Former Yugoslavia during the war.

=== Later years ===
The group visited Melbourne in 1995 and released, Low-Fi Lucy's Mobile Temple in November on Way Over There. They toured Australia including Big Day Out in 1996, Sad Trees followed in July which had both studio and live tracks. In February 1997, Hot Records released a compilation, The Secret of the Sad Tree, which was produced by Cohen, Turner and WPAM, ahead of their European tour from June. At the conclusion of the tour, in 1998, Wild Pumpkins at Midnight disbanded.

Manskey had returned to Tasmania after leaving the group, where she performed as a solo artist and worked as a music teacher. By 2025, she was a member of a blues, roots rock quartet: the Fringe Dwellers.

== Members ==
- Debra Manskey – vocals, guitar (1984–1990)
- Dan Tuffy – bass guitar, vocals, guitar (1984–1998)
- Michael Turner – vocals, guitar (1984–1998)
- Ashley Davies – drums (1990–1993)
- Greg Hynes – drums (1993–1998)
- Nick Larkins – guitar, vocals, bass guitar, organ, sitar (1993–1998)

== Discography ==
=== Albums ===
Title	Album details
Scenesville	Released: March 1987; Label: WPAM/Dex (DEX2733); Format: Cassette
Wild Pumpkins at Midnight	Released: 1988; Label: Major Records (MRLP 009); Format: Cassette, 12" EP
Living	Released: May 1989; Label: Mighty Boy (MBLP 7013); Format: Cassette, LP
This Machine Is Made of People	Released: August 1989; Label: Mighty Boy (MBWP 2001); Format: Cassette, LP
Little Victories	Released: 1990; Label: Mighty Boy (MBLP 7017); Format: Cassette, LP, CD
Strangeways	Released: April 1993; Label: Current, Survival (SUR 530CD); Format: Cassette, CD
Going Sick	Released: April 1994; Label: Survival (SUR 718CD); Format: Cassette, CD
Lo-Fi Lucy's Mobile Temple	Released: 1995; Label: Way Over There (WOT013); Format: CD
Sad Trees	Released: July 1996; Label: Way Over There; Format: CD
The Secret of the Sad Tree	Released: 1997; Label: Hot Records (Hot 1061CD); Format: CD
Instant Ocean	Released: 1998; Label: Way Over There (WOT033); Format: CD

== Awards and nominations ==
=== ARIA Music Awards ===
The ARIA Music Awards are a set of annual ceremonies presented by Australian Recording Industry Association (ARIA), which recognise excellence, innovation, and achievement across all genres of the music of Australia. They commenced in 1987.

Year	Nominee / work	Award	Result	Ref.
1990	This Machine Is Made of People	Best Independent Release	Won	
