= Let the Franklin Flow =

Single by Gordon Franklin And The Wilderness Ensemble
- Released: April 1983
- Length: 3:30
- Label: WEA
- Songwriter: Franklin River
- Producer: Trevor Lucas

Gordon Franklin And The Wilderness Ensemble singles chronology
"Razor's Edge" (1983)	"Let the Franklin Flow" (1983)	"That Day...Is Comin'" (1983)

"Let the Franklin Flow" is a song written by Shane Howard (credited as Franklin River) and recorded by Australian band Goanna (credited as Gordon Franklin and the Wilderness Ensemble). The song was released in April 1983 as a protest song to save the Franklin River from being dammed in Tasmania, Australia. "Let the Franklin Flow" peaked at number 12 on the Australian Kent Music Report.

== Background ==
On 13 February 1983, Gordon Franklin & the Wilderness Ensemble performed, "Let the Franklin Flow" at the Stop The Drop nuclear disarmament concert at the Sidney Myer Music Bowl. The ensemble included members of folk rock groups Goanna and Redgum, together with their mutual producer, Trevor Lucas. In April, "Let the Franklin Flow" was issued as a single with Lucas and Jeff Campbell as its producers. Shane Howard (of Goanna), the song's writer, was initially credited as F. River. The single reached No. 12 nationally. Proceeds supported the Tasmanian Wilderness Society's campaign against the proposed damming of Tasmania's Gordon and Franklin rivers for a hydroelectricity project. Howard physically supported the protests by joining the picket lines. The B-side of the single, "Franklin River – World Heritage", was written and recorded by the society's director, Bob Brown, who later became a senator and the leader of Australian Greens.

== Track listing ==
7" WEA (7-259941)

Side A: "Let the Franklin Flow" - 3:30
Side B: "Franklin River - World Heritage" (credited to Bob Brown) - 2:40

== Charts ==
=== Weekly charts ===
Weekly chart performance for "Let the Franklin Flow"
Chart (1983)	Peak position
Australia (Kent Music Report)	12

=== Year-end charts ===
Year-end chart performance for "Let the Franklin Flow"
Chart (1983)	Position
Australia (Kent Music Report)	98
