= Goanna (band) =

Australian rock band

- Also known as: Ectoplasmic Manifestation; The Goanna Band; Gordon Franklin & the Wilderness Ensemble
- Origin: Geelong, Victoria, Australia
- Genres: Roots rock, folk rock
- Years active: 1977–1985, 1998, 2021–present
- Labels: WEA Australia, ABC, EMI, Big Heart
- Members: Shane Howard; Rose Bygrave; Marcia Howard; Graham Davidge
- Past members: See members list
- Website: The official website of the band

Goanna are an Australian rock band which formed in 1977 in Geelong as The Goanna Band with mainstay Shane Howard as singer-songwriter and guitarist. The group integrated social protest with popular music and reached the Top 20 on the Australian Kent Music Report Singles Chart with "Solid Rock" (1982) and "Let the Franklin Flow" (released under the name Gordon Franklin & the Wilderness Ensemble in 1983). Their debut album, Spirit of Place, peaked at No. 2 on the related albums chart. They disbanded in 1987 and briefly reformed in 1998.

== History ==
=== 1977–1987 ===
Goanna was formed as an Australian folk-rock group by singer-songwriter and guitarist Shane Howard in Geelong in 1977. Alongside Howard, the original line-up was Mike Biscan (guitar), Richard Griffiths (bass guitar) and Rod Hoe (drums). During their early years the line-up changed numerous times, with only Howard as the mainstay. In 1979, the group consisted of Howard, keyboardist and vocalist Rose Bygrave, lead guitarist and vocalist Warwick Harwood, bass guitarist Carl Smith, drummer Gary Crothall and vocalist and harmonica player Ian Morrison. They recorded an independent 12" EP, The Goanna Band. The four-track EP was produced by Broderick Smith (ex-The Dingoes) and released on EMI Music. By 1981 the band were now Shane Howard, Rose Bygrave, Warrick Harwood, Peter Coughlan on bass guitar, Marcia Howard (vocalist and synthesisers), Graham Davidge (electric guitar) and Robbie Ross on drums. They had shortened the name to Goanna, and with their increasing popularity they attracted the interest of major record companies.

They supported James Taylor on the Australian leg of his 1981 tour. In February 1982, they signed to WEA Australia, and Shane Howard established a music publishing company, Uluru Music, headed by Helene Jedwab. The band released its single "Solid Rock" in September.

According to Howard, the inspiration came on a ten-day camping trip to Uluru during 1980, where he had a "spiritual awakening" which brought "the fire in the belly" to the surface over injustices to Australia's Indigenous peoples.

I realised that this country that I grew up in, that I thought was my country, wasn't. I had to reassess my whole relationship with the land and the landscape, and understand that we had come from somewhere else, and we had dis-empowered a whole race of people when we arrived.

— Shane Howard

WEA were at first reluctant to issue it as a single, and even Howard initially had a few doubts about whether commercial radio was ready for such a weighty political subject; however, Howard insisted on its release to make a statement on the British invasion of Australia. "Solid Rock" peaked at No. #2 on the Australian Kent Music Report Singles Chart, remaining in the Top 50 for 26 weeks. It also reached No. #31 on the US Billboard Mainstream Rock Chart and appeared on the Billboard Hot 100. In November 2013, "Solid Rock" was voted No. 20 in the Triple M Melbourne/Herald Sun Australian Top-40 chart of the last 40 years. Goanna released their debut album, Spirit of Place, in December. It was produced by Trevor Lucas, a member of UK folk-rock group Fairport Convention, who had returned to Australia in 1979. Spirit of Place reached No. 2 on the Kent Music Report Albums Chart, within two weeks of its release and remained there for 10 weeks, alternating with Midnight Oil's 10, 9, 8, 7, 6, 5, 4, 3, 2, 1 for the No. 1 & No. 2 spot. It also reached No. 179 on the US Billboard 200. For the album, Goanna were Rose Bygrave on keyboards, Peter Coughlan on bass guitar, Graham Davidge (ex-Little River Band) on guitar, Warrick Harwood, Shane Howard, his sister Marcia Howard on backing vocals, Mick O'Connor on keyboards and Robbie Ross on drums. An ever-changing line-up saw Harwood reluctantly leave the band. The follow-up single "Razors Edge" released in March 1983 reached No. 36 on the national charts.

On 13 February 1983, Gordon Franklin & the Wilderness Ensemble performed "Let the Franklin Flow" at the Stop The Drop nuclear disarmament concert at the Sidney Myer Music Bowl. The ensemble included members of Goanna and fellow folk rock group Redgum and Lucas. In April, "Let the Franklin Flow" was issued as a single with Lucas and Jeff Campbell as producer. Howard, the song's writer, was credited as F. River. The single reached No. 12 nationally. Proceeds supported the Tasmanian Wilderness Society's campaign against the proposed damming of Tasmania's Gordon and Franklin rivers for a hydroelectricity project. Howard physically supported the protests by joining the picket lines. The B-side of the single, "Franklin River – World Heritage", was written and recorded by the society's director, Bob Brown, who later became a senator and the leader of Australian Greens.

On 19 April 1983, Goanna won three Countdown Music and Video Awards for their work in 1982: Spirit of Place won Best Debut Album, "Solid Rock" won Best Debut Single and the band itself won the Best New Talent (Johnny O'Keefe Memorial Award). "Solid Rock" is the first charting rock record to feature extensive use of the didgeridoo, one of the world's oldest wood instruments, played by Billy Inda (No Fixed Address) and Bobby Djabanunga.

By late 1983, Goanna included new guitarists Ross Hannaford (Daddy Cool, Mighty Kong) and Russell Smith (Company Caine, Mighty Kong) with Robert Ross replaced by Geoff Bridgford (Bee Gees),(Jim Keays Band) on drums. In October they released a third single, "That Day (Is Coming Sooner)", which peaked at No. 67. Surprisingly WEA dropped the band from the label. Howard then travelled around the world looking for other record companies to pick them up. During this time he visited Ireland, the home of his ancestors and experienced another cultural awakening.

The whole experience of travelling through aboriginal Australia and awakening to that cultural reality made me ask the question, okay where do I fit here? In this landscape, in Australia, I'm not aboriginal, I'm not of the land, I'm not of this country – so I came from somewhere else. It made me want to look at where my own people had come from.

— Shane Howard

The band were just on the verge of signing a worldwide deal with CBS, when Warners in Australia contacted them and re-signed the band, who then spent much of 1984 recording a new album at John French's Fast Forward studio in Melbourne, the Music Farm Studio in Byron Bay, and also in Los Angeles at George Massenburg's The Complex studio, with Little Feat's keyboard player Billy Payne. The band's second album, Oceania, produced by Billy Payne, was released in April 1985 and reached No. 29. The first single from this album, "Common Ground", had been released in December 1984 and peaked at No. 42. The second single, "Dangerous Dancing", released in May 1985 only reached No. 91. Throughout 1985, the band toured relentlessly in support of the album, with a constantly revolving line-up of members, including at one stage ex-Little River Band drummer Derek Pellicci. The band then released a non-album single, "Song for Africa", dedicated to famine relief, in September but it failed to chart. WEA dropped Goanna from their roster again.

On 13 July 1985, Goanna performed three songs for the Oz for Africa concert (part of the global Live Aid program) – "Common Ground", "Song for Africa", "Solid Rock". It was broadcast in Australia (on both Seven Network and Nine Network) and on MTV in the US. In September, still promoting Oceania and the newly released "Song for Africa", Howard went "walkabout", and the band was forced to cancel $20,000 worth of bookings. Eventually a disillusioned Howard had travelled to South Australia to perform with Aboriginal musician and didgeridoo player Bart Willoughby (No Fixed Address). With Howard no longer involved, Goanna effectively disbanded but reformed, self-managed, for one final farewell tour of Victoria, NSW, and Tasmania with aboriginal band Coloured Stone in October 1986. The final gig of the tour was on 25 October 1986 for the Baha'i Concert For Peace at the Geelong Performing Arts Centre. The live version of "Solid Rock" featured on the re-mastered release of "Spirit of place" comes from this performance.

The final line-up consisted of Shane & Marcia Howard, Rose Bygrave; Dave Stewart drums; Jo Imbrol bass; Simon Curphey and Selwyn Burns guitars; Bunna Lawrie, Bart Willoughby, Tony Lovett and Nicky Moffatt on Didgeridoo & percussion: Bill Dart F.O.H sound and recording engineer for db Concert Sound. On 24 & 25 January 1987 yet another final fling occurred when much the same ensemble played at the Tamworth Country Music Festival sponsored by Yamaha Music Australia.

=== 1988–present: After Goanna ===
Shane Howard returned to a solo career, releasing Back to the Track (1988), River (1990), Time Will Tell (1993), Live in Ireland (1994), Clan (1996), Beyond Hope's Bridge (2000), Another Country (2004), Retrospect (2004), Songs of Love & Resistance (2006), Tarerer (compilation, 2006), Two Songmen with Neil Murray (2007), Goanna Dreaming (2010), Driftwood (2010), Other Side of the Rock (2012) and Deeper South (2015). Howard also appears on numerable compilation recordings. He wrote and recorded the song "Palya Wiru Uluru" with senior Anangu songwriter Trevor Adamson. They at performed live at the Close of the Climb at Uluru, 26 October 2019.

In 2000, Howard formed his own recording label, Goanna Arts. He was a founding member and musical director for the Black Arm Band productions Murundak (2006) Hidden Republic (2008) and repertoire consultant for Dirt Songs (2009), as well as a performing artist with the ensemble. He was creative director and producer for the stage concerts, CD and DVD of Exile: Songs & Stories of Irish Australia (2016).

Howard also produced albums for the Wirrinyga Band (Dreamtime Wisdom, Modertime Vision, 1995, the Pigram Brothers (Saltwater Country, 1995, Jimmy Chi (Corrugation Road, 1996), Andy Alberts (Gunditjmara Land, 1996 and Close To Home, 2001) with Pete Bird, Joe Geia (Old Friends, 2000), Tonchi McIntosh (Bridges, 2001, Mossie Scanlon (Tanam Ort, 2001), Patricia Clarke (Keep The Fires Burning, 2001), Oriel Glennon (Two Pink Turtles, 2000), Dead Reckoning (2016) with Pete Bird (2015) and Archie Roach (Journey, 2006) with Nash Chambers.

In 1986, Rose Bygrave toured briefly playing reggae with Australian singer Wendy Saddington. Bygrave, issued a solo single, "Maybe Midnight", in June 1989 and started working on a solo album which was not released at the time. Bygrave's first solo album, White Bird, finally appeared in 1999 and was followed by Walking Home (2001), North (2009) and The Yabby Catcher (2019).

Marcia Howard released the solo albums Butterfly (2000), Burning in the Rain (2004), Nashville Sessions EP (2015) and Everything Reminds Me (2017). Her song, a musical rendering of the William Blake poem "Poison Tree" (recorded with Mary Black), was released on the compilation CD A Woman's Heart-a Decade on (2003). In 2016, she appeared on The Voice. She was named Artist of the Year at the Port Fairy Folk Festival (2017).

Marcia Howard and Rose Bygrave released an album, Pearl (2011).

In October 1998, Shane Howard, Marcia Howard, and Bygrave re-formed Goanna and recorded a third album, Spirit Returns, released in November. Joining the line-up was Kerryn Tolhurst (the Dingoes), with other guest musicians on the album including Steve Cooney, Liam O'Maonlai, Bill Jacobi (bass guitar) and Greg Sheehan (drums). The tracks ranged from the bluesy "What Else is a Life" (which was released as the first single), the country-inflected "This Old Town", to the politicised "Song for East Timor", as well as a cover of the Tolhurst-penned Dingoes' track "Your Song". Marcia Howard's "Sorry" was influenced by the documentary Lousy Little Sixpence, based on Margaret Tuckers' story, If Everyone Cared, which chronicled her story of the "stolen generation" of Indigenous people. Shane Howard recorded in Ireland with Stephen Cooney and Liam O'Maonlai (Hot House Flowers), while Tolhurst added the final touches in New York. Goanna performed the song at the first National Sorry Day at Parliament House in Canberra in 1998, the same morning the "Bringing Them Home" report was released. "Sorry" was released by Goanna both on CD and as a resource book and video as a Sorry Day resource by Fraynework Media.

In August and September 2006, Shane Howard performed "Solid Rock" as part of the Countdown Spectacular tour and was joined at the Melbourne concerts by his sister, Marcia, and Bygrave. In October, a number of Goanna's tracks featured in the Triple M Essential 2006 Countdown of songs (which was voted and chosen by the listeners) including:

- "Solid Rock" (ranked 427 out of 2006 songs)
- "Razor's Edge" (ranked 1232 out of 2006 songs)

Two of the Goanna Band's guitarists, Mike Biscan and Warrick Harwood, died in April 2020.

Starting in June 2022, the band returned to tour around Australia to celebrate the 40th anniversary of Spirit of Place, with band members Shane Howard, Rose Bygrave, Marcia Howard and Graham Davidge playing, amongst others.

In September 2022, Goanna performed "Solid Rock" at the 2022 AFL Grand Final. In December 2022, Goanna re-released the song with Emma Donovan and William Barton.

In June 2023, Goanna released "Takayna", their first new music in 25 years. Shane Howard described the song as "A hymn to the natural world, to takayna/Tarkine and the palawa peoples long custodianship of that country".

== Members ==
Current members

- Shane Howard - vocals, acoustic and electric guitar (1977–85, 1986, 1998, 2021–present)
- Rose Bygrave - vocals, piano, synthesizer (1980–85, 1998, 2021–present)
- Marcia Howard - vocals, synthesiser, acoustic guitar (1980–85, 1986, 1998, 2021–present)
- Graham Davidge - guitar (1982–83, 2021–present)

Former members

- Mike Biscan - guitar (1977–78; died 2020)
- Warrick Harwood - guitar (1978–83; died 2020)
- Rick Griffiths - bass guitar (1977)
- Carl Smith - bass guitar (1978–80)
- Peter "Brolga" Coughlan - bass guitar, vocals (1981–85)
- Rod Hoe - drums (1977-1979)
- Gary "Zos" Crothall - drums (1979–80)
- Dave Stewart - drums (1980–81, 1986)
- Greg Martin - drums (1981-1982)
- Robert "Robbie" Ross - drums (1982–83)
- Ian Morrison - vocals, harmonica, percussion (1979-1984)
- Mick "The Reverend" O'Connor - organ, piano (1979 EP, 1982–1983; died 2022)

Touring & unofficial members

- Geoff Bridgford (Bee Gees) - drums (1983)
- Greg "Kenny" Sheehan - drums (1981, 1984-85 Oceania album)
- Joe Camilleri (Jo Jo Zep & The Falcons) - saxophone (1982 Spirit of Place album)
- Stephen Cooney - bass, didgeridoo, guitar, mandolin, banjo (1998)
- Joe Creighton - bass (1985)
- Joe Imbrol - bass guitar (1986)
- Simon Curphey - guitar (1986)
- Lisa Edwards (John Farnham Band) - backing vocals (1982–83)
- Suzie Dickinson - backing vocals (1982)
- Venetta Fields (Pink Floyd), (John Farnham) - vocals (1984 Oceania album)
- Ross Hannaford (Daddy Cool) - guitar, vocals (1983–84, 1985 Oceania album)
- Brian Holloway - guitar (1984, 1985 Oceania album)
- Billy Inda - percussion, didgeridoo (1982 Spirit of Place album)
- Judi Kenneally - cover art director (Spirit of Place and Oceania albums)
- Trevor Lucas (Fairport Convention) - guitar, Producer (1982 Spirit of Place album)
- Mal Logan Little River Band - keyboards (1984)
- Liam Ó Maonlaí (Hothouse Flowers) - vocals, keyboards, guitar (1998)
- Billy Payne (Little Feat) - keyboards, Producer (1984-85 Oceania album)
- Derek Pellicci (Little River Band) - drums (1985)
- Doug McDonald (Powerhouse) - drums, vocals (1985, 1986)
- Spiro Philipas - bass guitar (1985)
- John Phillips - guitar (1977, 1979)
- Sam See - guitar (1984 Oceania album, 1986)
- Cameron Goold - drums (1998)
- Russell Smith - guitar (1983)
- Alex Pertout - percussion (1984–85)
- Kerryn Tolhurst - guitar (1979 "EP", 1998)
- Bart Willoughby - drums, percussion, didgeridoo (1986)

== Discography ==
=== Albums ===
Year	Title	Peak chart positions	Certifications
Year	Title	AUS (Kent)	Certifications
1982	Spirit of Place: Released: November 1982; Label: WEA (600127)	2	AUS: 4× Platinum
1985	Oceania: Released: April 1985; Label: WEA (251556-1)	29	
1998	Spirit Returns: Released: November 1998; Label: ABC Music/EMI (724349821224)	150	

=== Live albums ===
Title	Album details
Live at the Canberra Workers Club 1985	Released: 1 September 2020; Format: CD (limited), DD, streaming; Label: Big Heart, Black Box Records/ MGM Distribution

=== Extended plays ===
Title	Details
The Goanna Band	Released: 1979; Label: EMI Music (PRS-2747)

=== Singles ===
Year	Single	Peak chart positions	Album
Year	Single	AUS (Kent)	Album
1982	"Solid Rock"	3	Spirit of Place
1983	"Razor's Edge"	36	Spirit of Place
1983	"Let the Franklin Flow" (credited as Gordon Franklin and the Wilderness Ensemble)	12	non-album single
1983	"That Day...Is Comin' Sooner"	67	non-album single
1984	"Common Ground"	42	Oceania
1985	"Dangerous Dancing"	91	Oceania
1985	"Song for Africa"	-	non-album single
1998	"Sorry"	-	Spirit Returns
1998	"What Else is a Life"	-	Spirit Returns
2022	"Solid Rock" (re-release featuring Emma Donovan and William Barton)	-	non-album single
2023	"Solid Rock" (re-release featuring Moss, Tasman Keith and William Barton)	-	non-album single
2023	"Takayna"	-	

== Awards and nominations ==
=== Countdown Australian Music Awards ===
Countdown was an Australian pop music TV series on national broadcaster ABC-TV from 1974 to 1987, it presented music awards from 1979 to 1987, initially in conjunction with magazine TV Week. The TV Week / Countdown Awards were a combination of popular-voted and peer-voted awards.

Year	Nominee / work	Award	Result
1982	Spirit of Place	Best Debut Album	Won
1982	"Solid Rock"	Best Debut Single	Won
1982	themselves	Best New Talent	Won

=== Environmental Music Prize ===
The Environmental Music Prize is a quest to find a theme song to inspire action on climate and conservation. It commenced in 2022.

Year	Nominee / work	Award	Result	Ref.
2025	"Takayna"	Environmental Music Prize	Nominated	
