= Shane Howard =

Australian musician (born 1955)

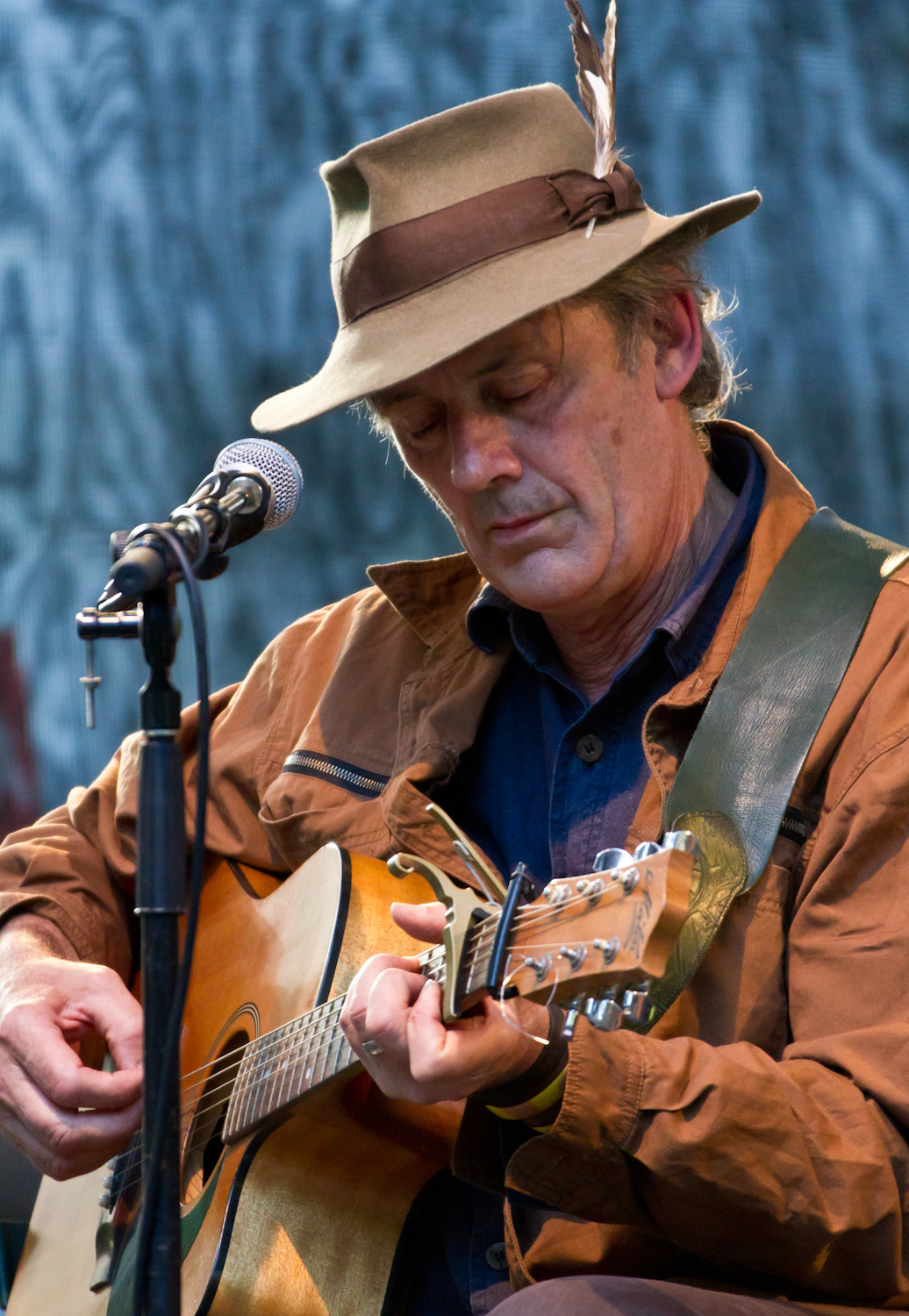
- Howard performing at WOMADelaide in March 2012

Background information
- Born: Shane Michael Howard; 26 January 1955 (age 71); Dennington, Victoria, Australia
- Origin: Geelong, Victoria, Australia
- Genres: Folk rock; Australian folk; roots; indie
- Occupations: Singer-songwriter, musician
- Instruments: Vocals, guitar, acoustic guitar, didgeridoo
- Years active: 1977–present
- Labels: Uluru/RCA; BMG; Big Heart; ABC; WEA; Goanna Arts
- Website: shanehoward.com.au

Shane Michael Howard AM (born 26 January 1955) is an Australian singer-songwriter and guitarist, he was the mainstay of folk rock group Goanna (1977–85, 1998) which had hit singles with "Solid Rock" (September 1982, No. 3) and "Let the Franklin Flow" (May 1983, No. 12) on the Kent Music Report and their album, Spirit of Place (November 1982, No. 2). After their disbandment he pursued a solo career.

== Biography ==
=== 1955–1975: Early life ===
Howard was born on 26 January 1955 and raised in the Victorian coastal town of Dennington 5 kilometres (3.1 mi) north-west of Warrnambool. He is the middle child of seven children of an Irish Catholic family living in a cramped factory cottage. His father, Leo, was a worker at the local Nestlés powdered milk factory, for 48 years. Howard loved music, led by his mother, Teresa, who played the piano and sang.

I don't know a world without music. I don't know what life's like without music. It just was always there. I was a middle child, so there were older brothers and sisters and you just slotted into that. I guess, you know, singing at mass and singing at church were the first sorts of contact with that, and Mum would play the organ.

— Shane Howard

According to Howard's younger sister, Marcia Howard, they were colloquially called, "The Von Trapp Family of the Western District", because they played and sang at local celebrations. Howard attended St Joseph's Christian Brothers' College, Warrnambool. "Elder brothers and sisters brought The Beatles, Dylan and Van Morrison and countless other influences into my already crowded imagination." His eldest brother, Eric, brought a guitar into the house and homework suffered thereafter.

After secondary education Howard moved to Melbourne, where he studied at Monash University for a year, before hitch hiking around Australia, busking and playing at folk clubs. During this time he worked in various jobs: picking grapes, picking ginger, screen printing, the railways, washing dishes and teaching. He studied education at Deakin University, Geelong where he became their first student council president.

=== 1976–1985: Goanna ===
By 1976 Howard had enrolled at Geelong Teachers College, and was recruiting people for a new folk-rock band. Originally known as the Ectoplasmic Manifestation, in late 1977 the group changed their name to the Goanna Band (later shortened to Goanna). Their set list included Bob Dylan and Little Feat cover versions. They performed at venues along the Great Ocean Road, in Victoria. Their line-up was fluid, with Howard as the sole mainstay; Australian music journalist, Ed Nimmervoll, opined that it was "as casual and non-competitive as a country town compared to the Big City. They were worlds away from whatever pop music was the going thing in the big city. Just doing their own thing. There was never a permanent line-up. Just Shane and his friends, picking up a following by playing to surfies and 'heads' along Victoria's coastal regions." Rose Bygrave joined on keyboards and vocals in 1979.

In May 1981, on a doctor's advice, Howard took a month's hiatus from performing and travelled to Uluru:

I had come from this beautiful inspiring aboriginal tradition, and the contrast between that and this harsh reality of conflict with western world 300 kilometres away, it marked me for all time. I saw an incredible injustice that needed to be dealt with. And also, I realised that this country that I grew up in, that I thought was my country, it wasn't. I had to reassess my whole relationship with the land and the landscape, and understand that we had come from somewhere else, and we had disempowered a whole race of people when we arrived.

— Shane Howard

While travelling back to Melbourne, Howard began working on a song, "Stand Y'r Ground" (which became "Stand Your Ground"). Its lyrics didn't match their folk-rock music style. He put it aside, and developed a different, rougher melody with new lyrics. When he arrived in Melbourne, he had a new song for the group to record, based upon his experiences at Uluru, "Solid Rock". Goanna were the opening act on James Taylor's 1981 Australian tour, which eventually led to a record deal with WEA (Warner Bros.' Australian affiliate) in February 1982. At that time, his sister, Marcia joined the group on backing vocals.

In September 1982 "Solid Rock", from Goanna's debut album, Spirit of Place (November 1982), was released as a single. Australian musicologist, Ian McFarlane, described it as "a damning indictment of the European invasion of Australia. WEA was reluctant to issue it as the first single, and indeed the band felt it had little commercial appeal." Both the single and its associated album peaked at No. 2 on the respective Kent Music Report charts.

By February 1983 the line-up was the Howards and Bygrave with Peter Coughlan on bass guitar, Graham Davidge on guitar, Warrick Harwood on guitar and backing vocals, Mick O'Connor on organ and Robbie Ross on drums. Lisa Perry of The Canberra Times caught their local performance; she opined that they provided, "a night of solid Australian rock and roll... The throaty vocals of keyboards whiz [Bygrave] rang clear through some very slick guitar work from leader Shane Howard and guitarists [Davidge] and [Harwood]."

In May 1983 Goanna used the pseudonym, Gordon Franklin and the Wilderness Ensemble, to release "Let the Franklin Flow" as a single, "in support of the Tasmanian Wilderness Society's campaign against the proposed damming of Tasmania's Franklin River." (see Franklin Dam controversy#Blockade). At a live performance, Stop the Drop (for nuclear disarmament), at the Sidney Myer Music Bowl on 13 February that year, an ad hoc ensemble had Goanna joined by members of fellow Australian groups, Redgum and Midnight Oil, which recorded a live version of the track. Howard, the song's writer, was credited as F. River. The single reached No. 12 nationally. The concert was simulcast on national TV and radio and it was released as a video recording, Stop the Drop: a Concert for Nuclear Disarmament in 1983.

The group's second studio album, Oceania, appeared in April 1985, which peaked at No. 29 but the group disbanded in October of that year. In December 1988 Howard explained the reasons for their split, "we tried to change and stop being so commercial, but we changed too much and it failed. We put so much energy and money into the second album and it was a flop. We never recovered from that."

The Howards and Bygrave briefly reformed Goanna in late 1998, with a new line-up, to issue the group's third album, Spirit Returns, in November 1998. They disbanded again by year's end. In March 2003 Howard re-issued a remastered version of Spirit of Place, adding seven tracks of previously unreleased recordings including live versions of "Let the Franklin Flow", "Underfoot, Underground" and "Solid Rock".

=== 1986–present: Solo career ===
In 1986 Howard began performing as a solo artist with his backing band, Shane Howard and Friends, composed of former Goanna members: Marcia, Simon Curphy on guitar, Joe Imbrol on bass guitar, and Dave Stewart on drums and joined by Joe Geia on guitar and vocals. Also in that year he was a session musician on Redgum's final studio album, Midnight Sun (November 1986). In the following year he formed the Shane Howard Band with Marcia, Curphy and Geia joined by a variable line-up: Amanda Brown, Peter German, Damian Howard (his youngest brother) on guitar, Mick King, Roger Mason, Greg Pedley, John Watson, Bart Willoughby and Paul Worrell.

Howard's first solo album, Back to the Track (December 1988), was recorded and produced by the artist at Sing Sing Studios, Melbourne. He wrote eight of its ten tracks and provided lead vocals, acoustic guitar and didgeridoo. It was issued on Uluru Music with distribution by RCA Victor. The Canberra Times' Matt Cowley noticed "the title reflects the past three years of his life... his journey around Australia's outback was to see the 'real' people of Australia and hear their stories... According to Howard, his songs have cultural importance though he just writes his songs for himself." A fellow reviewer at the newspaper felt that "[no] two tracks on this album are alike. Whether Howard is trying to confuse us all or show that he is indeed a diversely talented soul, he has succeeded in doing both. Blues, country, rock folk – take your pick, he does them all (and in a variety of combinations)."

Howard released his second album, River, in 1990. It was co-produced by the artist with Mark Moffatt; for the recording he used Ricky Fataar on drums, Ross Hannaford on guitar and Mark Punch on guitar.

In 1993 Howard made his first tour of Ireland supporting Irish singer, Mary Black, whose recording of Howard's song, "Flesh & Blood", was a Top 15 hit there. Howard returned the favour when he and Black performed together with Liam O'Maonlai at the 1994 Port Fairy Folk Festival introducing her to Australian audiences. Songs from this show are included on Howard's live album, "Live in Ireland, Australia and New Zealand" (1994).

In 2010 Howard released a new album Goanna Dreaming and toured nationally his band, featuring his daughter Myra Howard, Ruben Shannon (bass), Rory McDougall (Black Arm Band) (drums), John Hudson (guitar), and Amy Saunders, formerly of Tiddas. Howard's solo album, Deeper South, was released on 6 March 2015.

In 2017, Howard and John Schumann (ex Redgum) wrote, recorded and released a single together, titled "Times Like These".

== Discography ==
=== Studio albums ===
List of albums, with Australian chart positions
Title	Album details	Peak chart positions
Title	Album details	AUS
Back to the Track	Released: December 1988; Label: Uluru Music/ RCA Victor (VPCD 0762); Format: CD, LP, Cassette	111
River	Released: October 1990; Label: Uluru Music/ RCA Victor (VPCD 0827); Format: CD, LP, Cassette	68
Time Will Tell	Released: September 1993; Label: BMG (74321162432); Format: CD, Cassette	115
Clan	Released: 13 November 1996; Label: EMI Music (4895712); Format: CD	—
Beyond Hope's Bridge	Released: 5 August 2002; Label: Shane Howard (CDBH0101); Format: CD	—
Another Country	Released: 16 August 2004; Label: Goanna Arts (GA040406); Format: CD, digital download	—
Songs of Love and Resistance	Released: 4 November 2006; Label: Goanna Arts (GA010606); Format: CD, digital download	—
Goanna Dreaming	Released: 9 July 2010; Label: Goanna Arts (GA100101); Format: CD, digital download	—
...Other Side of the Rock	Released: October 2012; Label: Goanna Arts (GA120101); Format: CD, digital download	169
Deeper South	Released: 6 March 2015; Label: Goanna Arts (GA140101); Format: CD, digital download	—
Dark Matter	Released: 14 March 2020; Label: Goanna Arts (GA200101); Format: CD, digital download	—

=== Live albums ===
List of live albums, with Australian chart positions
Title	Album details	Peak chart positions
Title	Album details	AUS
Live in Ireland, Australia and New Zealand	Released: May 1994; Label: Big Heart Productions (BH94001); Format: CD	163
2songmen : Live in Darwin (with Neil Murray)	Released: 2006; Label: Format: CD, digital download	

=== Compilation albums ===
List of compilation albums
Title	Album details
Retrospective: Collected Songs 1982–2003	Released: 2004; Label: Goanna Arts (GR040405); Format: 2×CD, digital download
Driftwood – Rare and Unreleased	Released: 5 February 2010; Label: Goanna Arts (GA09010); Format: CD, digital download

=== Singles ===
Year	Single	Peak chart positions	Album
Year	Single	AUS	Album
1988	"Back to the Track	148	Back to the Track
1989	"Just a Feeling"	—	Back to the Track
1990	"Walk on Fire"	48	River
1990	"If the Well Runs Dry"	85	River
1991	"Here and Now"	132	River
1991	"Escape from Reality"	40	non album single
1993	"I Shall Be Released"	152	Time Will Tell
1993	"Flesh & Blood"	—	Time Will Tell
2017	"Times Like These" (with John Schumann)	—	Dark Matter
2018	"Try" (with Denis Ginnivan)	—	Dark Matter

== Awards ==
In 2000 Howard was awarded a Fellowship by the Music Fund of the Australia Council in acknowledgement of his contribution to Australian musical life over many years.

In January 2016, Howard was appointed a Member of the Order of Australia for significant service to the performing arts as a singer, songwriter and guitarist, to the recording industry, and to Indigenous musicians. In October 2023, he returned his medal in the wake of the Voice to Parliament referendum being defeated.

On 7 February 2023, the honorary degree of Deakin Honorary Doctorate was conferred upon Howard for his distinguished career in the Australian music industry through production, songwriting and performance and for continued advocacy for Australia's Indigenous community and the environment through his music.

In November 2025, Shane Howard AM (singer-songwriter and Goanna frontman) was awarded the Melbourne Prize for Music ($60,000) for his body of work and outstanding contribution to Australian music and cultural life. The Melbourne Prize for Music is a biennial or triennial award run by the Melbourne Prize Trust that celebrates Victorian musicians, composers, and performers across all genres. The main prize awards $60,000, making it one of Australia's most valuable music development awards. This award is supported by Major Patron The Vera Moore Foundation and The Tallis Foundation..

=== Music Victoria Awards ===
The Music Victoria Awards are an annual awards night celebrating Victorian music. They commenced in 2006.

Year	Nominee / work	Award	Result
2013	Other Side of the Rock	Best Folk Roots Album	Nominated

== Bibliography ==
- Howard, Shane (2009). Solid Rock. One Day Hill. ISBN 978-0-9805643-2-7.
- Howard, Shane; O'Brien, Teresa (2010). Shane Howard Lyrics. One Day Hill. ISBN 978-0-9805643-5-8.
