= Rose Bygrave =

Australian singer-songwriter

Roslyn Louise Bygrave (born 1955) is an Australian singer-songwriter.
