= Yves Marchand and Romain Meffre =

French photographers

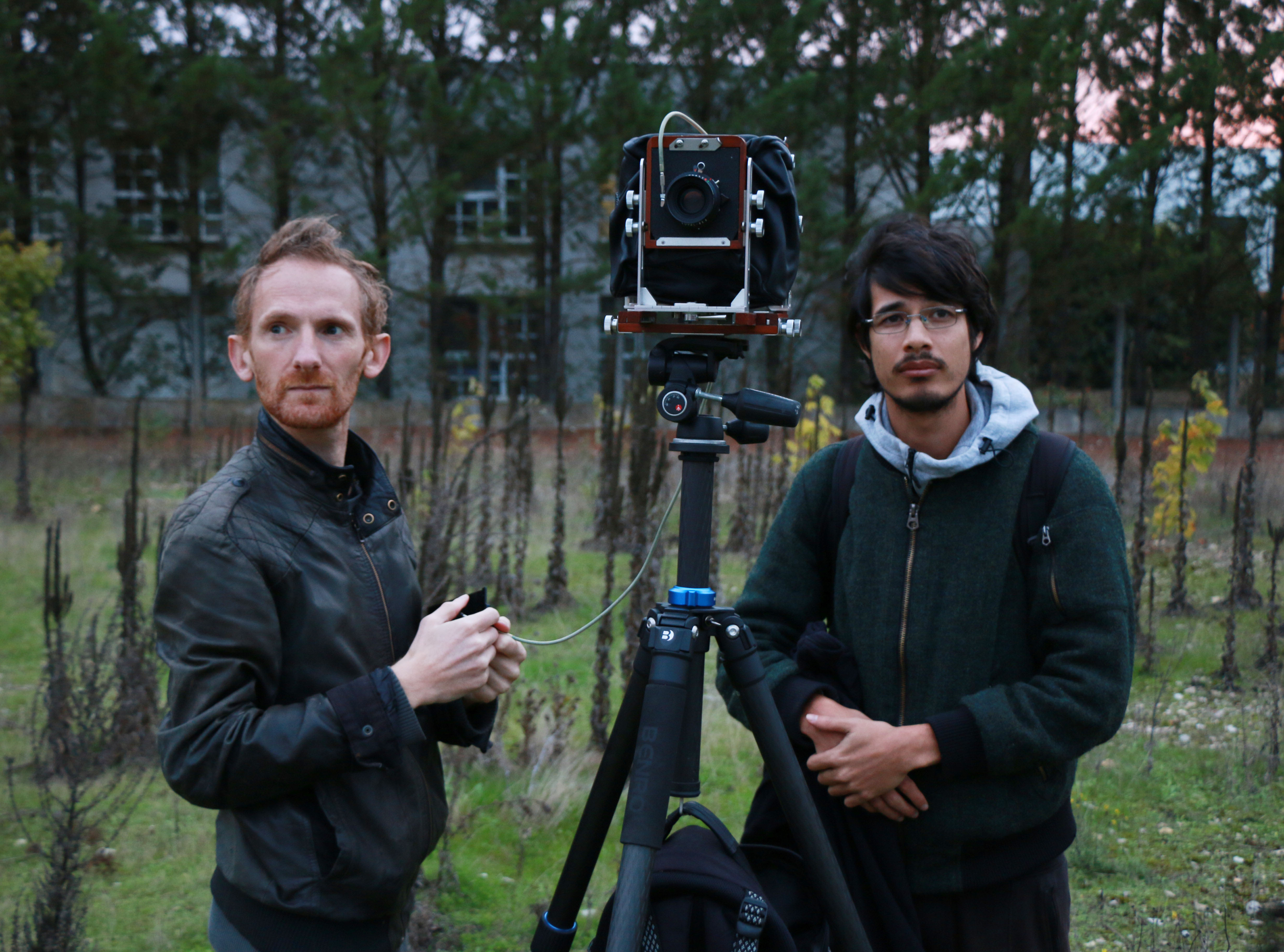
- Born: Yves Marchand January 5, 1981 (age 45); Romain Meffre March 9, 1987 (age 39); Orsay, France; Châtenay-Malabry, France
- Occupation: photographer
- Website: marchandmeffre.com

Yves Marchand (born January 5, 1981) and Romain Meffre (born March 9, 1987) are a French photography duo, working primarily with a large-format view camera and concentrating on photography of contemporary urban ruins. They live and work in Paris.

The Ruins of Detroit, their series from 2005, introduced them to the general public.

== Biography ==
Both natives of suburban Paris, Marchand and Meffre began practicing photography on their own in 2001, despite having no formal academic training. They met at the end of 2002 through a shared interest in contemporary ruins, introduced by Timothy Hannem, founder of Glauque-Land, (Note: Glauque-Land website: glauqueland.com.) one of the first French-language websites dedicated to exploring modern ruins. They then began their artistic collaboration by exploring the post-industrial ruins of suburban Paris.

At the start both Marchand and Meffre used their own 35 mm cameras, photographing abandoned historical buildings and sites in a state of decay or transition. Eventually, they stepped up their activity and expanded to other European countries. In October 2005, they traveled to Detroit, the former capital of automobile production, a city that they discovered specifically through DetroitYES!, the website of Lowell Boileau, (Note: DetroitYES! website: detroityes.com.) as well as through the works of Camilo José Vergara. The result of this first trip was an exhibition in June 2006 at Kennory Kim Gallery in Paris. A photograph from the coll

In 2009, Marchand and Meffre's photographs of ' Motor City' were noted by Time magazine, presenting their images for the first time in a portfolio on its website. An image from their series The Ruins of Detroit appeared on the cover of the October 5, 2009, issue of Time, thus introducing their work to a wider audience. Their project was subsequently reported on by newspapers and magazines (in particular El País, L'Espresso, The New York Times, The Guardian, Libération, Der Spiegel, Huffington Post). The city of Detroit was a metonym of the 2008 financial crisis.

Marchand and Meffre met photographer Robert Polidori, photographer–author of books such as Zones of Exclusion: Pripyat and Chernobyl, Havana and After the Flood. His large-scale photographs of architecture and interiors had a similar sensitivity to their own works, and Polidori himself visited Detroit in 2001. In 2009, he introduced the duo to his publisher, Gerhard Steidl, who published their first book, The Ruins of Detroit, at the end of 2010 with an introduction by Polidori. The book was reprinted multiple times.

In 2008, the pair traveled to Japan to begin a new series about Gunkanjima, an abandoned mining town on a small island. The series was published as a book in 2013 by Steidl.

Between 2014 and 2016, Marchand and Meffre made several trips to Budapest to produce a series of typologies of the internal courtyards of the city's apartment buildings.

The nature of their subjects has also led them to document various buildings before or during renovation, such as Hôtel-Dieu in Lyon, department stores in La Samaritaine and Pantin, or the International Fair in Tripoli, Lebanon.

Marchand and Meffre continue their longtime series on post-industrial monuments and landscapes that they started in 2002.

In 2006, while continuing to work on their series about Detroit, Marchand and Meffre began photographing old movie theaters which either had been abandoned or had been repurposed and reused. The series was completed in 2021 and was published in the book Movie Theaters by Prestel.

In 2024, following the example of other artists and photographers such as Éric Tabuchi, Louis-Cyprien Rials, Brodbeck & de Barbuat, they began experimenting with generative artificial intelligence. They saw in it an opportunity to stage their fascination with ruins and the anxieties of the present era by imagining an abandoned Paris, while playing on the boundary between fiction and reality and on the fear of human obsolescence in the face of the rise of AI. The project thus became for them a way to examine the relationships between the city, art, and, more specifically, photography, and their shared connection to the ruin and its representations. The title of the series, Les Ruines de Paris (published by Albin Michel in 2024), refers to the albums of the 1871 Paris Commune that were abundantly produced by photographers such as Charles Marville and Alphonse J. Liébert and their 19th-century contemporaries, often titled Les Ruines de Paris. Continuing this line of inquiry, they combined the AI-generated images with antique stereoscopes.

== Photography ==
"When visiting ruins, we have always tried to focus on remarkable buildings whose architecture strongly embodies the psychology of an era, of a system, and to observe and their metamorphoses", Marchand and Meffre have said about their work.

Marchand and Meffre are both influenced by the typological and encyclopedic aspects of the work of Bernd and Hilla Becher and the German photographers of Industrie-Kultur, (Note: Industrie-Kultur website: industriekultur-fotografie.de.) as well as the large-format images of Robert Polidori. Another important influence is the sociological vision of author and photographer Camilo José Vergara, as well as the entire culture of ruins exploration, examples of which can be found in photographic series with very obvious narrative and atmospheric aspects published by Henk van Rensbergen on the website Abandoned Places, (Note: Abandoned Places website: abandoned-places.com.) one of the main websites dedicated to photographs of abandoned places in the early 2000s. At the end of the decade, this culture of exploring ruins was grouped with other activities of visiting hidden or inaccessible places such as the mines of Paris or roof hacking under the term urbex, a blend of "urban exploration".

The pair explain that "when they photograph, no one has a predefined role, they share their ideas until they find the ideal point of view".

Initially using their own 35 mm cameras, the photographers each purchased a 4 × 5-inch camera and returned to Detroit in October 2006 to continue their series. These cameras required a much lengthier and more meticulous set-up process, which led Marchand and Meffre to settle on using just one camera. According to them, this was "the fairest and the most motivating way of producing an image". Each image was discussed and agreed on before taking it, thus sealing the formation of their duo. The camera allows them to make large prints.

Marchand and Meffre often shoot their images using long exposures in dimly-lit areas, using available light to respect the original atmosphere, which sometimes requires exposures as long as an hour. When absolutely necessary, they use handmade battery-powered lights to paint the scene.

== Projects ==
- 2005–2010 – The Ruins of Detroit
- 2008–2012 – Gunkanjima
- 2014–2016 – Budapest Courtyards
- 2006–2021 – Theaters
- 2024 – Les Ruines de Paris
- 2002–ongoing – Industry

== Collections ==
- Detroit Institute of Arts
- Deutsches Filminstitut
- Maison européenne de la photographie
- New National Museum of Monaco
- Fondation Carmignac

== Books ==
- The Ruins of Detroit, Steidl, 2010
- Gunkanjima, Steidl, 2013
- Graffiti Général, Éditions Dominique Carré, 2014
- Movie Theaters, Prestel, 2021
- Les Ruines de Paris, Albin Michel, 2024

== Awards ==
- Deutscher Fotobuchpreis (The Ruins of Detroit), 2012
- Prix des libraires « J' aime le livre d' art » (Les Ruines de Paris), 2024
