= Chao Kuang Piu =

Hong Kong businessman (1920–2021)

- Born: 24 November 1920; Shanghai, China
- Died: 12 March 2021 (aged 100); Hong Kong, China
- Occupation: Businessman
- Title: Founder of Dragonair
- Children: Susana Chou; Silas K. F. Chou; Ronald Kee-Young Chao
- Awards: Silver Bauhinia Star

Chao Kuang Piu SBS (Chinese: 曹光彪; pinyin: Cáo Guāngbiāo; Cantonese Yale: Chou^{4} Gwong^{1} Biu^{1}; 24 November 1920 – 12 March 2021) was a Hong Kong–based Chinese industrialist, sometimes referred to as Hong Kong's "Wool Magnate" given his involvement in Hong Kong's garment industry. He was one of the co-founders of Dragonair, Hong Kong's first Chinese-owned airline, which was subsequently acquired by Cathay Pacific.

Chao was a recipient of Hong Kong's Silver Bauhinia Star award in 2002.

== Biography ==
Chao was born on 24 November 1920 in Shanghai. His father was a successful businessman in Shanghai. The family traced its ancestry to Ningbo in the Zhejiang province in China. At the age of 17, he had to quit studies when his mother died and his father was critically ill.

In 1950, Chao went to British Hong Kong to set up his business by importing wool-spinning equipment from England and starting his wool-spinning factory. He set up the garment manufacturing and trading company Novel Enterprises in 1964. His career has been noted for growing the then nascent Hong Kong textile industry. He expanded his operations overseas into France, Germany, Portugal and the United States through the 1970s. His companies emerged as one of the world's largest wool enterprises. Chao was one of the first few investors in Mainland China, setting up spinning mills, when the reform and opening up led by Deng Xiaoping started in late 1970s. He was referred to as "Wool magnate" or "King of Cotton Yarn" given his success in the industry.

Chao was a co-founder of Dragonair airlines in 1985, with shipping magnate Pao Yue-Kong and Hong Kong–based businessman Henry Fok, along with investments from China Merchants Group and China Resources. The carrier was Hong Kong's first Chinese-owned airline. The company was subsequently sold to Hong Kong's flag carrier Cathay Pacific in 2006. The carrier was subsequently renamed Cathay Dragon in 2016, and ended operations in 2020 during the COVID-19 pandemic.

Chao was the honorary chairman of the Wharton School's Global Alumni Forum in Hong Kong. He was also the Chairman of Novel Enterprises Ltd. Some of his other positions included being the chairman of the Board of Novel Enterprises, chairman of Dragonair and member of the Hong Kong Consultative & Selection Committee. He was also the honorary consul of the Republic of Mauritius in Hong Kong. He served as an academic advisor to the universities of Tsinghua and Ningbo, and was an honorary professor at Zhejiang University.

== Personal life ==
Chao's daughter, Susana Chou, is the first President of the Legislative Assembly of Macau, Macau SAR, while his son Silas K. F. Chou, is a director of Novel Enterprises which owned Tommy Hilfiger and Michael Kors. His granddaughter is socialite Veronica Chou. Chao's eldest son, Ronald Kee-Young Chao (Chinese: 曹其鏞, born 1939), is also a director of Novel Enterprises and founded the Bai Xian Scholarship program in Hong Kong.

Chao died on 12 March 2021 at the Hong Kong Adventist Hospital – Tsuen Wan in Hong Kong. He was aged 100.

== Honors and awards ==
- The Asteroid 4566 Chao Kuang Piu was named after him by the Purple Mountain Observatory
- Silver Bauhinia Star by the Hong Kong government in 2002
- Wharton School Dean's Medal, awarded by the Wharton School of the University of Pennsylvania

== See also ==
- Chao Kuang Piu High-tech Development Fund
