= Veronica Chou =

Chinese-American businessman

- Born: Veronica Sylvia Wing Wai Au Chou; 1984 (age 41–42); Hawaii, US
- Education: University of Southern California
- Occupations: Businesswoman and (now banned) charity trustee
- Known for: former trustee at Fashion for Relief
- Title: Founder and CEO, Everybody & Everyone; President, Iconix China Group and Novel Fashion Holdings
- Spouse: Evgeny Klyucharev (m. 2012)
- Children: 2
- Father: Silas Chou

Veronica Chou (Chinese: 曹穎惠; pinyin: Cáo Yǐnghuì, also known as Veronica Sylvia Wing Wai Au Chou; born 1984) is a Chinese-American businesswoman.

== Early life ==
Veronica Chou was born in Hawaii, United States. Her father is Silas Chou. Chou grew up in Hong Kong. She attended high school at Choate Rosemary Hall in Connecticut and went on to study communications and business at the USC in California.

== Career ==
Chou is the president of Iconix China Group and Novel Fashion Holdings, companies founded by her father.

In 2019, she launched Everybody & Everyone, a fashion brand selling women's clothes.

In November 2021, she quit as a trustee of Fashion for Relief, a charitable foundation by Naomi Campbell, amidst a financial probe by the regulatory commission.

In September 2024 the UK Charity Commission found that "there had been serious misconduct and/or mismanagement in the administration of the [Fashion for Relief] charity by its trustees since it was established", including mismanagement of funds and incomplete vetting of charity partners. Following the decision, Chou was barred as a trustee for four years.

== Personal life ==
Chou married at Wan Chai's Grand Hyatt Hotel in 2007. She spends her time in Singapore and California with her daughter Jessica.

In November 2017, during a trial at London's Blackfriars Crown Court, Chou and Klyucharev accused their chauffeur of theft. All charges were subsequently dropped.
