= Silas Chou =

Hong Kong billionaire (born 1946)

- 曹其峰
- Born: Silas Kei Fong Chou; September 1946 (age 79); British Hong Kong
- Citizenship: China
- Children: 2, including Veronica
- Parent: Chao Kuang-piu
- Relatives: Susana Chou (sister)

Silas K. F. Chou (Chinese: 曹其峰; pinyin: Cáo Qífēng; born September 1946) is a Hong Kong-based billionaire business magnate, active in the fashion sector.

== Early life ==
Chou's father was Chao Kuang-piu. His father founded South Ocean Knitters, one of the Hong Kong's "largest knitwear manufacturers and exporters", in which he still owns a stake. In 1978, Chou and his father founded Xiang Zhou Woollen Mills in the Zhuhai Special Economy District. His sister, Susana Chou, was the President of the Legislative Assembly of Macau from 1999 to 2009.

== Career ==
In 1989, Chou and Lawrence Stroll founded Sportswear Holdings to acquire Tommy Hilfiger. Chou was the largest shareholder and became chairman of the company. In 2006, he sold his shareholding to Apax, a UK private equity firm for US$1.6 billion.

In 2003, Chou and Stroll bought a majority share in Michael Kors for US$100 million. In June 2018, Chou sold the last of his investment in Kors. Chou has also heavily invested in Karl Lagerfeld and Pepe Jeans.

In 2018, a consortium led by Stroll, which included Chou, acquired the assets of the Force India Formula One team after it entered administration, subsequently forming a new team under the name Racing Point Force India.

== Personal life ==
Chou is married, with two daughters, Veronica and Vivian, and lives in Hong Kong. Both daughters are active in his fashion business.
