= Chao Kuang Piu High-tech Development Fund =

Tech fund at Zhejiang University

The Chao Kuang Piu High-tech Development Fund (Traditional Chinese: 曹光彪高科技發展基金; Simplified Chinese: 曹光彪高科技发展基金), is a fund at Zhejiang University, for promoting high-tech innovation and development.

== Introduction ==
The Hong Kong-based industrial magnate Chao Kuang Piu (曹光彪), who is a Zhejiang native, donated 10 million HK dollar to Zhejiang University. The goal of the fund is to promote high-tech innovation and development at Zhejiang University. The fund is named after Chao Kuang Piu for his generous financial supports and contributions to the university.

Chao again donated 18 million HKD to the university. The donation was used to build the Chao Kuang Piu High-tech Building (曹光彪科技大樓/曹光彪科技大楼), which is coupled with the fund.

December 2001, Chao further donated 20 million HKD to found the current Chao Kuang Piu High-tech Talent Fund (曹光彪高科技人才基金), which is also coupled with the previous High-tech Development Fund.
