= Timothy Hannem =

French artist

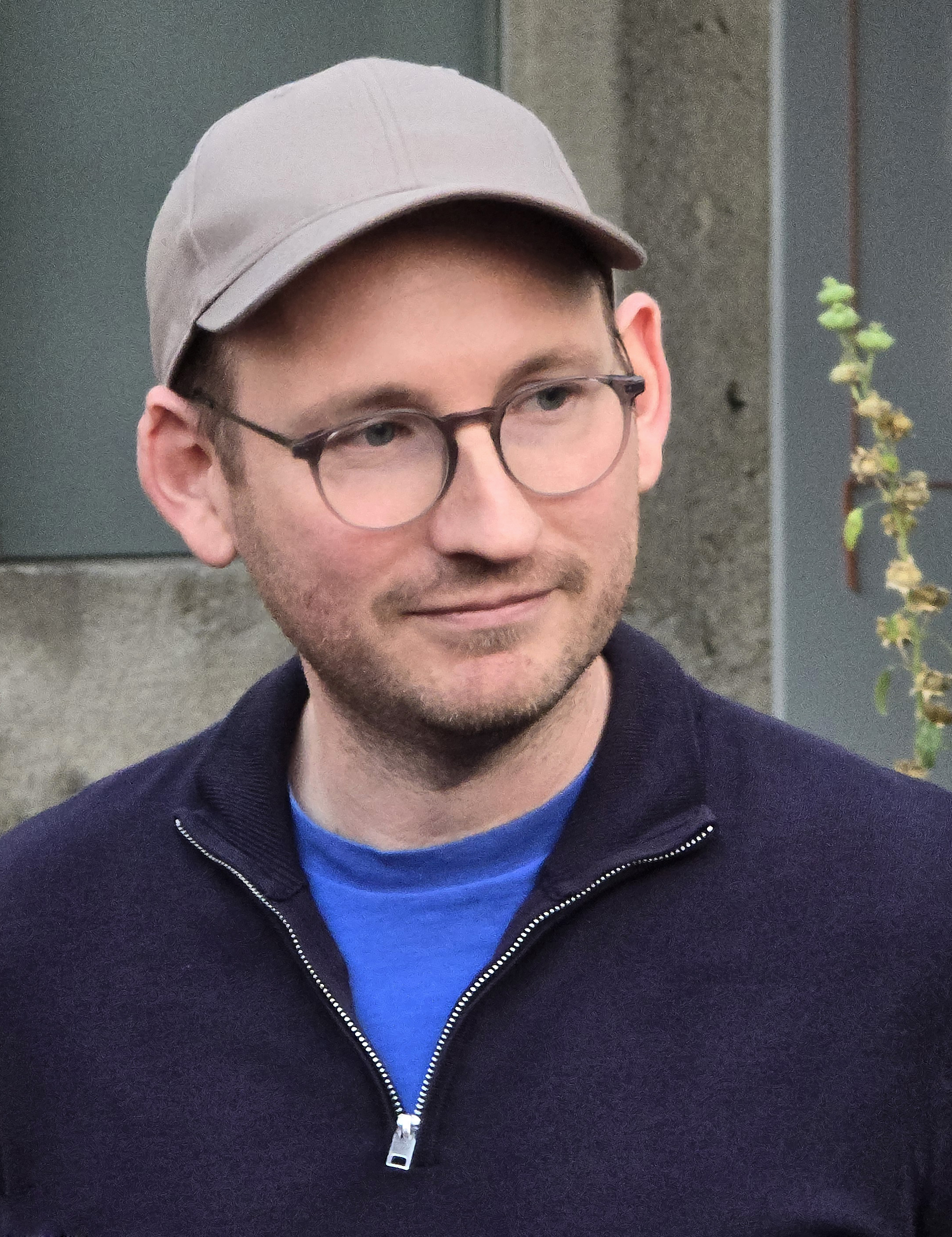
- Born: April 14, 1979 (age 47); Agen, France
- Occupation: comic illustrator
- Website: www.tim-illustrateur.com

Timothy Hannem (born April 14, 1979) is a French illustrator, bloggger and amateur photographer.

== Biography ==
Timothy Hannem, was born on 14 April 1979 in Agen, and grew up in Fresnes. He obtained a baccalaureate in applied arts in 1998 at the Adolphe Cherioux high school in Vitry-sur-Seine. In 2000, at the same high school, he obtained a BTS in interior design. Subsequently, he did numerous odd jobs before becoming a temporary worker. He recounts these odd jobs and his adventures as a temporary worker in the two volumes of "Quotidien Survival" ("Everyday Survival"), a self-published comic published at 300 copies between 2007 and 2010. From 2012 to 2014, he published online "Un Feutre dans ma Limonade" ("A Pen in my Lemonade") an autobiographical story created with children's felt-tip pen, a tool he has used since opening the blog "A Cup of Tim" in 2008. In 2015,"Quotidien Survival" was officially published by Éditions Lapin.

Since January 2008, he has hosted the comic strip blog "A Cup of Tim". He is also the author of two humorous websites: "Je suis Gothique" ("I'm Gothic"), a site parodying the Gothic movement, and "Vive les Racailles" ("Hail to Rascals"), a site based on the same formula in a "rascal" version. He is also the author of the websites "Tubulamarok" and "Glauque-Land", stories of visits to abandoned places. Urban exploration has been a passion since childhood.

In March 2016, Arthaud published Urbex: 50 Secret and Abandoned Places in France, an adaptation of his website "Glauque-Land" (photos and texts) with additional illustrations created for the occasion.

In September 2016, "Promenade" was published by Éditions Lapin, a wordless comic drawn between 2008 and 2016 on the blog "A Cup of Tim". In 2019, the first two volumes of "Un Feutre dans ma Limonade" were published by Éditions Lapin, as well as the children's book "L'Œil du Cartable". In 2019, "URBEX Europe: 35 Secret and Abandoned Places in France and Europe" was released, continuing its theme of urban exploration.

In 2021, Canevas was published by Éditions Lapin, a transmedia comic book whose even-numbered chapters (in colour) are published online, while the odd-numbered chapters (in black and white) can be discovered in the print version, which contains both colour and black and white chapters intermixed.

In 2023 is published "Glauque-Land, 25 Years of Urbex in France", by Éditions Albin Michel. This book provides an overview of his work as an urban explorer since the late 1990s. With a preface by Yves Marchand and Romain Meffre, this third book on this theme features the unique feature of featuring the people who inhabited the abandoned places presented in the book through pages from fictional diaries.

In 2024, he presented the exhibition "Urbex, Racines et Fragments" ("Urbex, Roots and Fragments") at the Fresnes Ecomuseum : photographs, illustrations, comic strips, and videos of places explored in and around Fresnes, Val-de-Marne, from the late 1990s to the present day. In 2025, he drawn three illustrations for Maxime Fontaine's book "Chaman Urbex".

== Publications ==
- The Masque of the Red Death, animated adaptation of the novel by Edgar Allan Poe, 2005.
- Quotidien Survival : Tome 1 : Les p'tits boulots, self-published, 2006.
- Quotidien Survival : Tome 2 : L'intérim, self-published, 2007.
- Une culture de l'ombre, à la rencontre des Gothiques, Éditions Luciférines, 2013.
- Un Feutre dans ma Limonade, self-published, 2012 à 2014.
- Quotidien Survival , Lapin Éditions, official publication, 2015.
- Anthologie : Maisons Hantées, Éditions Luciférines, 2015.
- URBEX : 50 Lieux Secrets et Abandonnés en France, Éditions Arthaud, 2016.
- Promenade, Lapin Éditions, 2016.
- URBEX Europe : 35 Lieux Secrets et Abandonnés en France et en Europe, Arthaud, 2019.
- L'Oeil du Cartable, Lapin Éditions, 2019.
- Un Feutre dans ma Limonade - Tome I, Lapin Éditions, 2019.
- Un Feutre dans ma Limonade - Tome II, Lapin Éditions, 2020.
- Un Feutre dans ma Limonade - Tome III, Lapin Éditions, 2021.
- Canevas, Lapin Éditions, 2021.
- Glauque-Land, 25 ans d'Urbex en France, Éditions Albin Michel, 2023.
- Chaman Urbex (illustrations), Maxime Fontaine, Editions Scrinéo, 2025.

== Exhibitions ==
- Urbex, racines et fragments : le monde de Timothy Hannem, Ecomusée de Fresnes, Val-de-Marne, 2024.
- De l'ombre à la lumière, le patrimoine abandonné revisité (collectif), Château du Val Fleury de Gif-sur-Yvette, 2026.
