= Drone Bomb Me =

Single by Anohni

from the album Hopelessness
- Released: 9 March 2016
- Genre: Electronic; dance
- Length: 4:10
- Label: Rough Trade
- Songwriters: Anohni; Ross Birchard
- Producers: Anohni; Hudson Mohawke; Oneohtrix Point Never

Anohni singles chronology
"4 Degrees" (2016)	"Drone Bomb Me" (2016)

Music video
- "Drone Bomb Me" on Apple Music

"Drone Bomb Me" is a song by Anohni, the lead singer of Anohni and the Johnsons. It is the first track and second single from her debut solo studio album, Hopelessness, and was released digitally on 9 March 2016 on Rough Trade Records.

== Background and release ==
The song was premiered on Annie Mac's BBC Radio 1 show, where Annie named it her "Hottest Record in the World" for 9 March 2016. On the subject of the song's meaning, Anohni said:

It’s a love song from the perspective of a girl in Afghanistan, say a 9-year-old girl whose family’s been killed by a drone bomb. She is kind of looking up at the sky and she’s gotten herself to a place where she just wants to be killed by a drone bomb too.

== Music video ==
A tearful Naomi Campbell, as depicted in the music video

The music video for "Drone Bomb Me" was released on 9 March 2016 and features British supermodel Naomi Campbell. The video was directed by Nabil Elderkin and art-directed by Givenchy's Riccardo Tisci. Writing for Rolling Stone, Brittany Spanos described the video: "The clip stars supermodel Naomi Campbell, who spends most of the video sitting in a chair lip-synching to the electronic track. Her face is covered in tears as she delivers the song, and interspersed between those moments, male dancers are menacingly contorting their bodies and an upright Campbell is posing seductively."

== Critical reception ==
"Drone Bomb Me" received very positive reviews from contemporary music critics. The song was chosen upon release as Pitchfork's "Best New Track". Nina Mashurova stated that, "As with "4 Degrees," which personified the hypocrisy behind climate change, ANOHNI is not letting anyone off the hook. 'Blow me from the mountain and into the sea,' she croons over a major synth drop. Her voice, and the production by Hudson Mohawke and Oneohtrix Point Never, are both darkly seductive, implicating the listener as they trace the war all the way home to the body. Writing in the language of unrequited love with pleas like 'I want to be the apple of your eye' and 'let me be the one that you choose tonight,' ANOHNI turns the abstracted, faceless nature of drone warfare into something chillingly intimate." Rolling Stone named "Drone Bomb Me" one of the 30 best songs of the first half of 2016: "Anohni has made one of the year's most challenging and exhilarating LPs with Hopelessness, using avant-club-pop to explore the dark side of American politics and foreign policy the way others singers might explore doomed romance. On this incredible ballad, she plays a young Afghani girl whose parents have been killed by a U.S. drone strike, praying for the same fate herself like a tragic supplicant." Billboard ranked "Drone Bomb Me" at number 79 on their "Billboard's 100 Best Pop Songs of 2016: Critics' Picks" list, commenting “You know that thing where you're so guilty about your implicit culpability in a military–industrial complex that indiscriminately kills innocent people by remote that you almost wish you yourself were dead? No? Well, you will after listening to Anohni's shimmering, gorgeous electro-pop masterpiece, which finds brand-new levels of beauty in socio-political awareness.” In the annual Village Voice's Pazz & Jop mass critics poll of the year's best in music in 2016, "Drone Bomb Me" was ranked at number 15, tied with Beyoncé's "Sorry" and Drake's "One Dance". Pitchfork listed "Drone Bomb Me" on their ranking of the 100 best songs of 2016 at number 6, and in 2019 ranked the song at number 22 on its list of the 200 Best Songs of the 2010s.

== Cover versions ==
Bring Me the Horizon covered the song as part of their Spotify singles EP.

== Track listing ==
Digital download
No.	Title	Length
1.	"Drone Bomb Me"	4:10
