= Babywoman =

1994 album by Naomi Campbell

Studio album by Naomi Campbell
- Released: 3 October 1994
- Recorded: 1994
- Studios: Mayfair Studios, London; Soundtrack Studios, New York
- Genre: R&B
- Length: 49:34
- Label: Epic
- Producers: Gavin Friday; Tim Simenon; Youth; Justin Strauss; Bruce Roberts; P.M. Dawn

Singles from Babywoman
- 1. "Love & Tears" Released: 1994; 2. "I Want to Live" Released: 1994

Babywoman is the debut studio album by the English model Naomi Campbell. It was released on 3 October 1994 through Epic Records.

Campbell collaborated with a number of producers and songwriters, including Gavin Friday, Tim Simenon, Youth, Justin Strauss, Bruce Roberts and P.M. Dawn. Musically, Babywoman is an R&B album that additionally fuses different genres, such as house, trip hop and country. The album cover was photographed by Ellen von Unwerth.

Upon its release, the album received generally mixed reviews from music critics and was a commercial failure in the United Kingdom, where it did not chart. However, the album was a success in Japan and sold over one million copies worldwide. Two singles were released from the album: "Love & Tears", which reached number 40 on the UK Singles Chart, and "I Want to Live".

== Background ==
The album was titled after a nickname that designer Rifat Ozbek had for Campbell.

== Critical reception ==
Professional ratings
Review scores
Source	Rating
AllMusic	2/5 stars
Music Week	3/5 stars
NME	5/10

Alan Jones from Music Week wrote, "A more accomplished singer than anyone dared anticipate, Campbell has produced a bit of a curate's egg of a debut album, making an ill-advised stab at updating T Rex's 'Ride a White Swan', a too similar cover of Zoe's 'Sunshine on a Rainy Day' and an inspired rescue of an obscure Donna Summer ballad ('All Through the Night') alongside some pleasing, if vocally slight, pop/dance fare." Emma Forrest from NME said, "Naomi Campbell's debut singing effort is stubbornly not as bad as it should be. Her voice is an inoffensive, ineffectual whining alto, but that's not a problem."

== Track listing ==
No.	Title	Writer(s)	Length
1.	"Love & Tears"	Gavin Friday, Tim Simenon	4:20
2.	"I Want to Live"	Gavin Friday, Maurice Seezer	3:55
3.	"Ride a White Swan"	Marc Bolan	3:32
4.	"Life of Leisure"	Jill Cunniff, Gabrielle Glaser	4:54
5.	"Babywoman"	Gavin Friday, Tim Simenon	5:39
6.	"Looks Swank (Spooky)"	Justin Strauss	4:28
7.	"Picnic in the Rain"	Bruce Roberts	4:32
8.	"When I Think About Love"	P.M. Dawn	4:42
9.	"All Through the Night"	Donna Summer, Bruce Roberts	5:20
10.	"Sunshine on a Rainy Day"	Zoë Pollock, Martin Glover	5:45
11.	"I Want to Live (Reprise)"	Gavin Friday, Maurice Seezer	2:27
Total length:			49:34

== Singles ==
"Love and Tears" is the only song from the album to have a video. The video was directed by Anton Corbijn. The single reached number 40 in the UK and the top 10 in Italy.

=== Charts ===
Chart (1994)	Peak position
Belgium (Ultratop 50 Flanders)	21
France (SNEP)	36
UK Singles (Official Charts)	40
