= Ruins photography =

Sub-genre of photography

Large room at the abandoned Eastern State Penitentiary, Philadelphia, Pennsylvania by Carol M. Highsmith (archive of the Library of Congress)

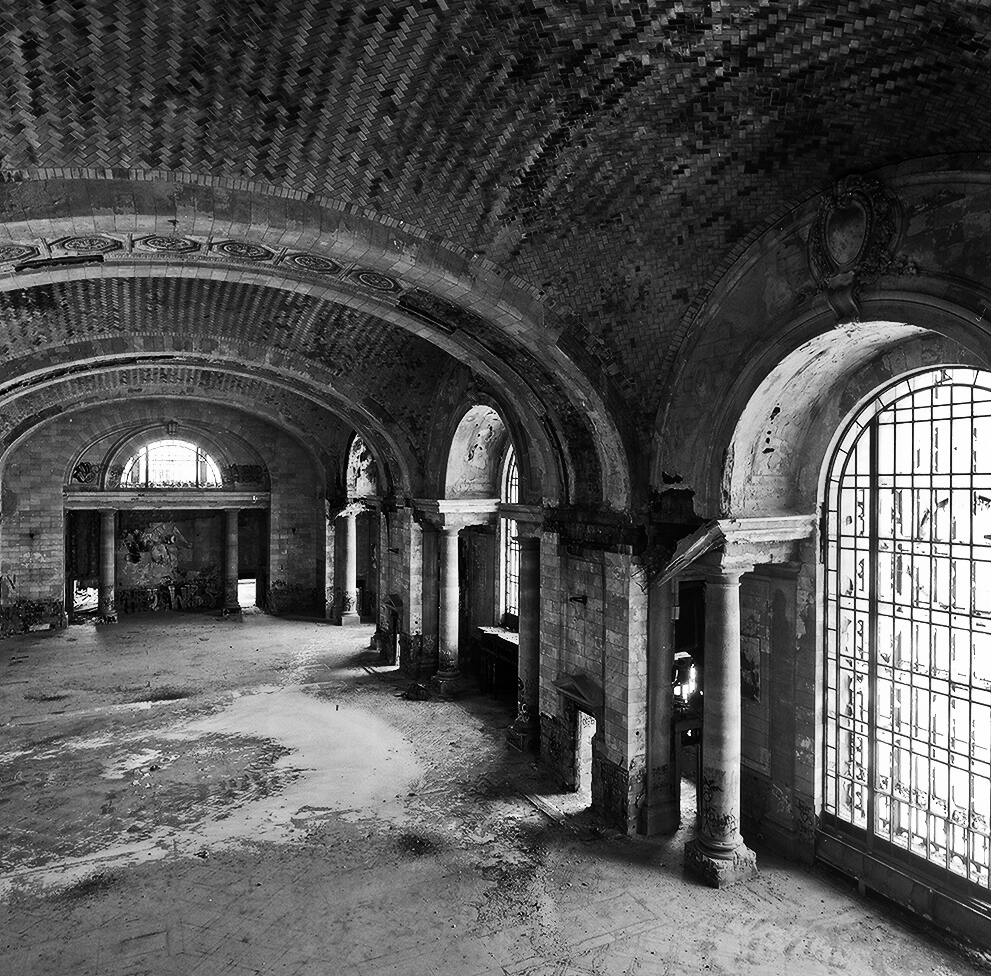
Detroit's formerly abandoned Michigan Central Station was a frequent subject of photographers, and a backdrop for filmmakers

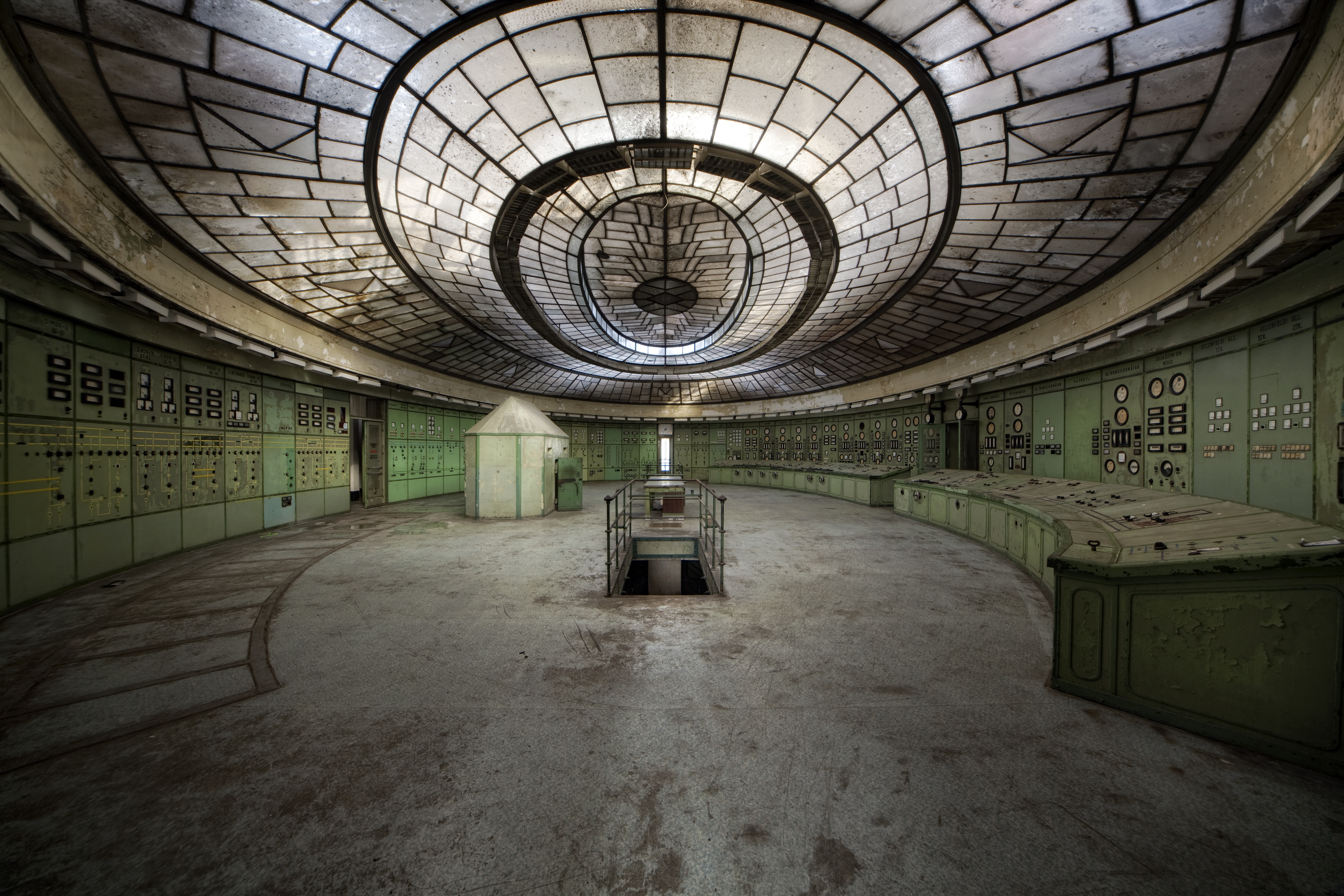
Abandoned power plant in Budapest, Hungary

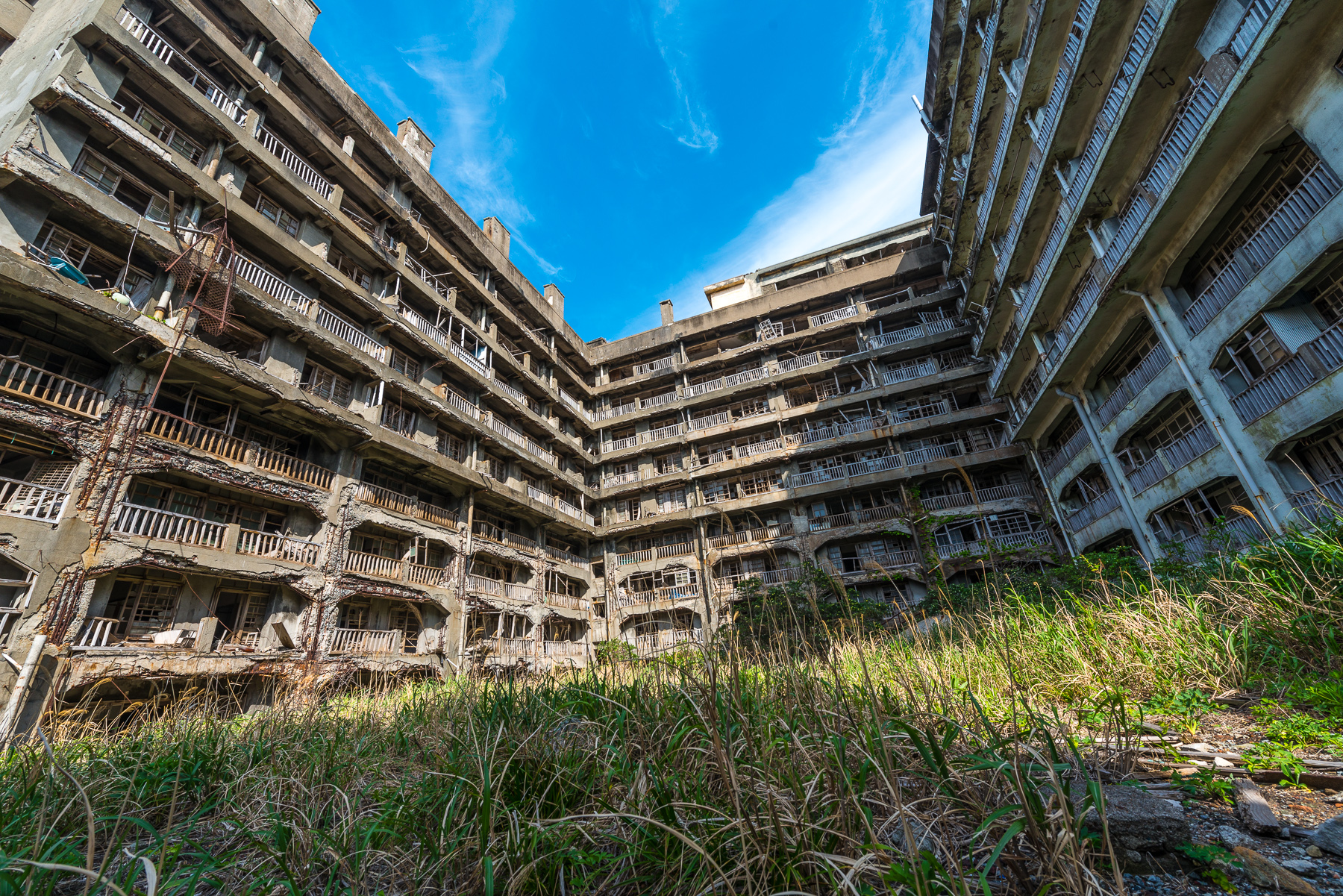
Block 65 on Hashima Island, Japan

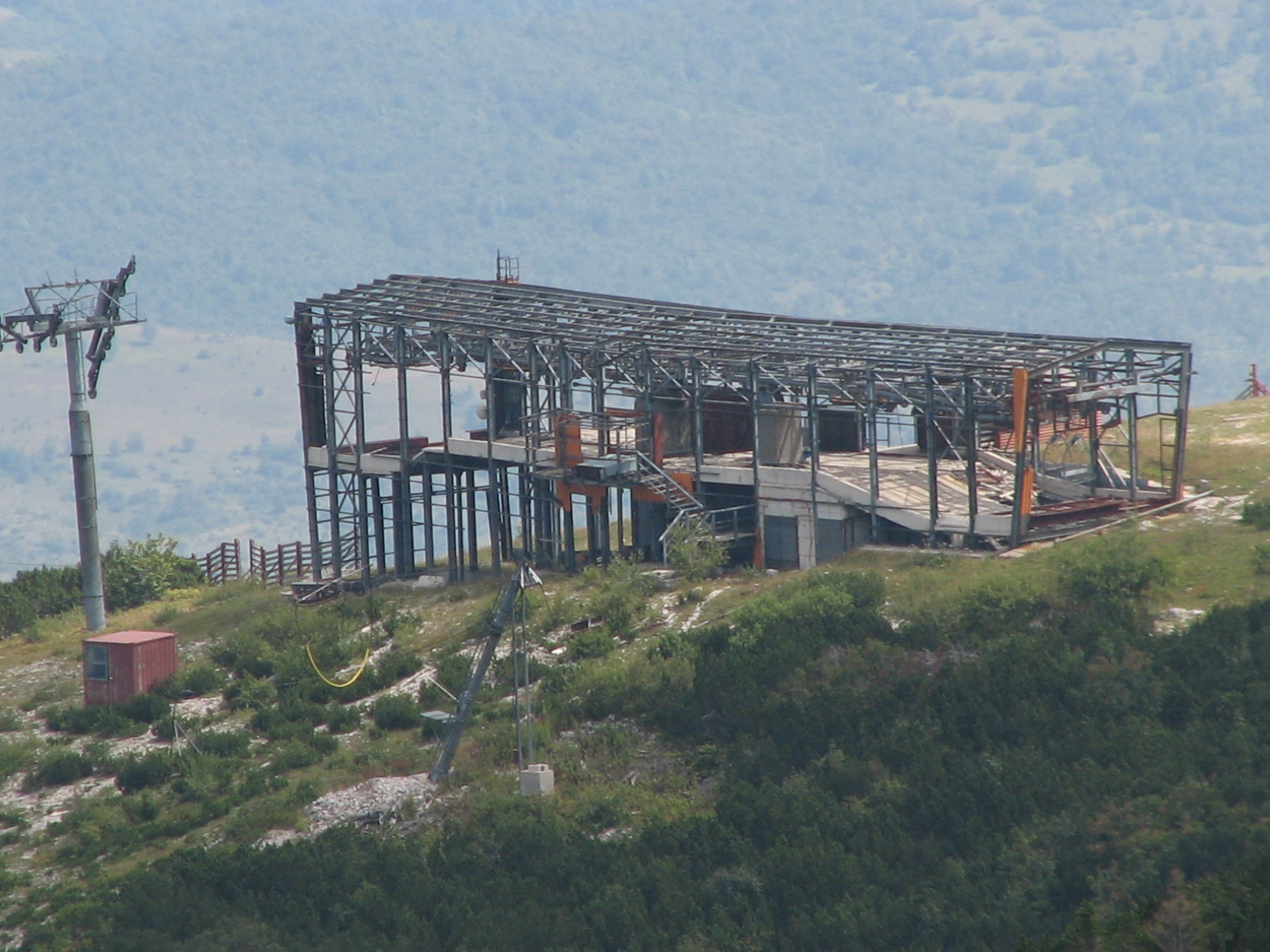
Ruined ski station, built for the 1984 Winter Olympics in Sarajevo

Ruins photography, sometimes called ruin porn, is a movement in photography that takes the decay of the built environment (cities, buildings, infrastructure, etc.) as its subject. While "ruins" may be broadly defined as the remnants of human achievement (e.g. the remains of ancient Sumer or Machu Picchu), "ruins photography" generally refers to the capture of urban decay in the post-industrial areas of the world. Ruins photography catalogues the abandonment and decline of cities most of all, and has sparked conversations about the role of art in various urban renewal, restoration, and conservation projects in cities throughout the globe.

== Background ==
The roots of ruins photography come from popular notions of the picturesque which would often feature motifs concerned with the aesthetics of abandoned and dilapidated architecture. Staples of ruins photography include abandoned houses, neglected factories left over from the Industrial Revolution or auto industry booms, as well as bridges, abandoned lots, tenant or apartment buildings, or gutted theaters or offices.

Photographer Camilo José Vergara helped to bring the style greater recognition in the 1990s with his books The New American Ghetto and American Ruins. In the 2010s, photographers Yves Marchand and Romain Meffre published The Ruins of Detroit which brought further interest.

The style relies heavily on lighting, detail close-ups, long shots, and digital imaging. Ruins photography is different from historical architectural photography in that it does not focus on comparisons between past and present, but instead focuses on the state of the subject and how it came to be dilapidated.

== Reception ==
Some critics liken ruins photography to exploitation, comparing its appeal to that of sensationalist pornography. While most regard it for aesthetic purposes, critics find fault with the style's minimal attention to the cities and places visited.

John Patrick Leary, a professor at Wayne State University in Detroit, said:

And others roll their eyes at all the positive attention heaped on the young, mostly white ‘creatives,’ which glosses over the city’s deep structural problems and the diversity of ideas to help fix them. So much ruin photography and ruin film aestheticizes poverty without inquiring of its origins, dramatizes spaces but never seeks out the people that inhabit and transform them, and romanticizes isolated acts of resistance without acknowledging the massive political and social forces aligned against the real transformation, and not just stubborn survival, of the city.

Others embrace ruins photography as a way of marketing for potential tourism, while yet others have insisted that it can serve as a powerful call to action. Responding to critics such as Leary, Detroit blogger James Griffioen suggested that there are different ways to mediatize urban and industrial decline: one spectacular and sensational (exploitative), the other more responsible.

The few photographers and reporters I met weren’t interested at all in telling the story of Detroit, but instead gravitated to the most obvious (and over-photographed) ‘ruins,’ and then used them to illustrate stories about problems that had nothing to do with the city (which has looked like this for decades). I take pictures of ruins, too, but I put them in the context of living in the city. These photographers were showing up with $40,000 cameras to take pictures of houses worth less than their hotel bills.

Ruins photographers are responding to critics who suggest that the genre pays little attention to local stories, by bringing the histories of the places and structures they photograph into their narratives. However, this new wave of ruins photography—more sensitive to the histories of structures and cities—is being met by a new wave of criticism. Locals in Detroit, Chicago, and other Rust Belt cities most featured by ruins photographers, point to the continued absence of the people living among the ruins from such accounts.

== See also ==
- "The Capital of the Ruins"
- Dead mall
- Howard Mansfield
- Urban exploration
- Passive rewilding
