= Peter Lindbergh =

German photographer and film director (1944–2019)

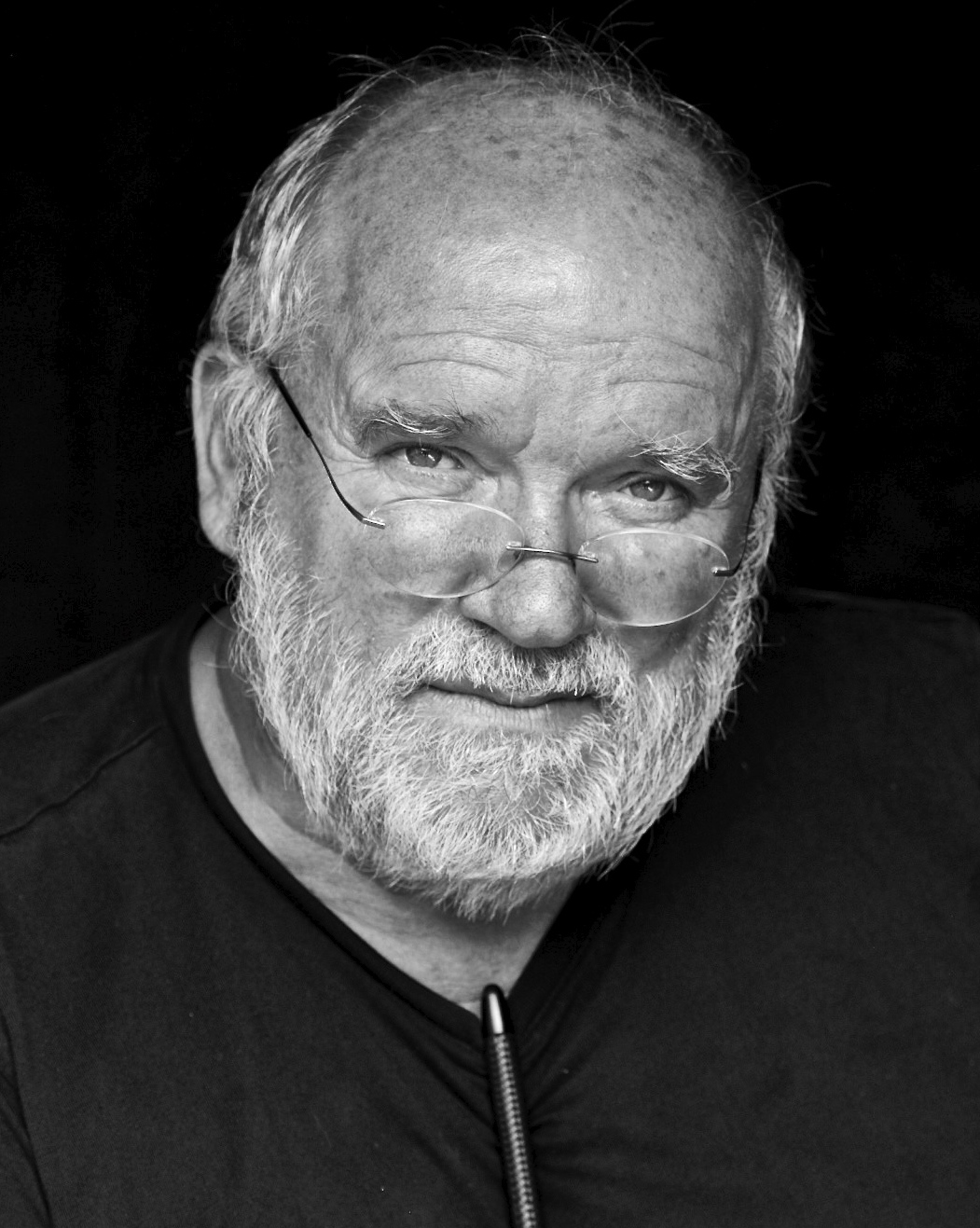
- Lindbergh in 2015
- Born: Peter Brodbeck; 23 November 1944; Lissa (Leszno), German-occupied Poland
- Died: 3 September 2019 (aged 74); Paris, France
- Occupation: Photographer
- Spouses: Astrid Lindbergh (divorced) Petra Sedlaczek (m. 2002)
- Children: 4, including Simon
- Website: peterlindbergh.com

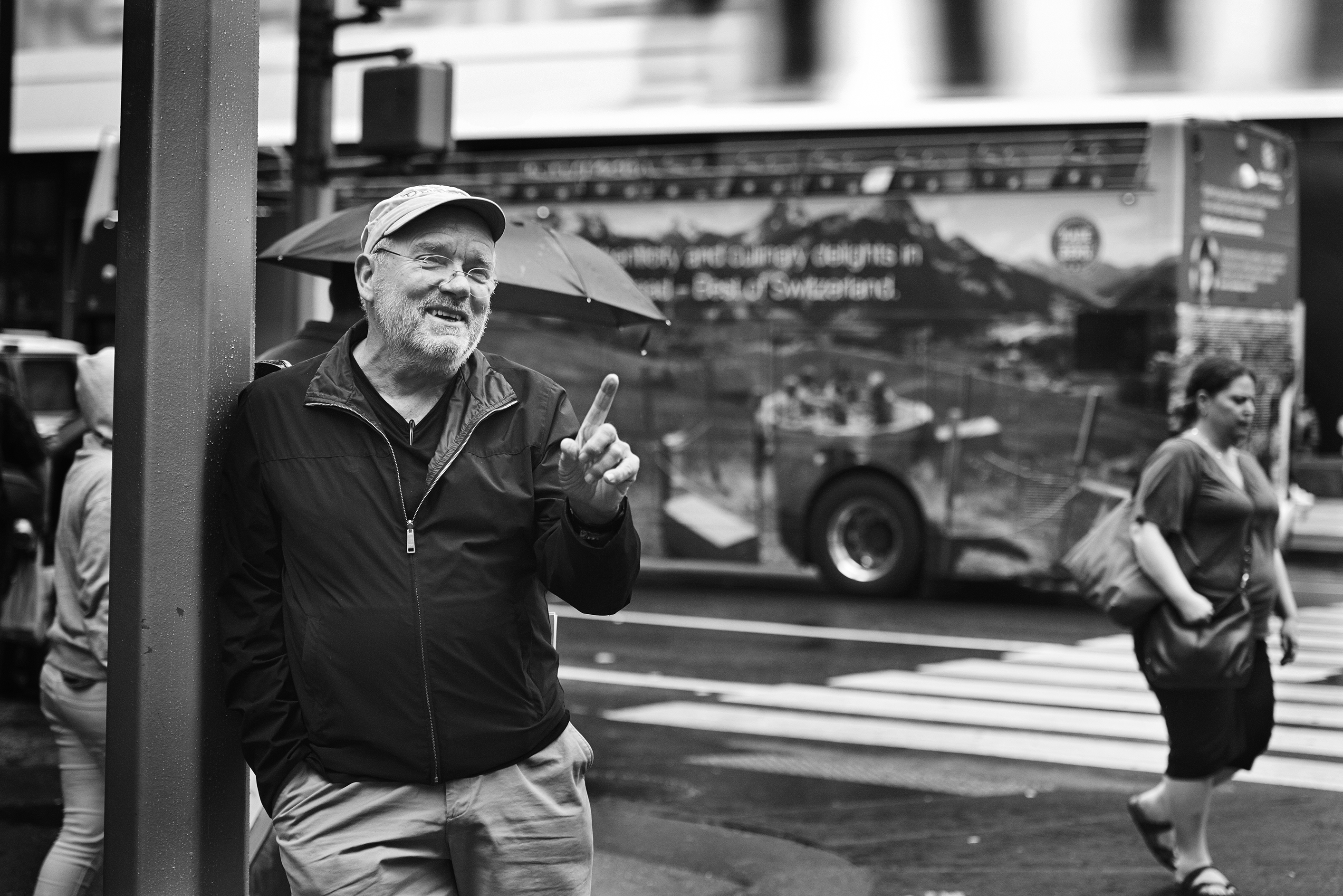
Lindbergh in New York, 2016

Peter Lindbergh (born Peter Brodbeck; 23 November 1944 – 3 September 2019) was a German fashion photographer and film director.

He had studied arts in Berlin and Krefeld, and exhibited his works before graduation. In 1971, he turned to photography and worked for the Stern magazine.

In fashion photography, he portrayed models Linda Evangelista, Naomi Campbell, Tatjana Patitz, Cindy Crawford and Christy Turlington together for the January 1990 British Vogue cover, beginning an era of supermodels. He photographed the Pirelli Calendar three times (1996, 2002, 2017), made several films, and created covers for music including Tina Turner's Foreign Affair, Sheryl Crow's The Globe Sessions and Beyoncé's I Am... Sasha Fierce.

His work has been presented at international exhibitions. Lindbergh preferred black & white photography, and noted in 2014: "This should be the responsibility of photographers today to free women, and finally everyone, from the terror of youth and perfection."

== Early life and education ==
Lindbergh was born on 23 November 1944 in Lissa (Leszno), Reichsgau Wartheland, German-occupied Poland. He spent his childhood in Duisburg.

As a teenager, he worked as window dresser for the Karstadt and Horten department stores in Duisburg. Coming from a part of Germany close to the Dutch border, North Rhine-Westphalia, he spent summer holidays with his family in the Netherlands on the coast near Noordwijk. The vast beaches and the industrial settings of his hometown Duisburg, influenced his work strongly over the years. In the early 1960s, he moved to Lucerne and months later to Berlin where he enrolled in the Berlin Academy of Fine Arts. He hitchhiked to Arles in the footsteps of his idol, Vincent van Gogh. Lindbergh recalled these years: "I preferred actively seeking out van Gogh's inspirations, my idol, rather than painting the mandatory portraits and landscapes taught in art schools." After several months in Arles, he continued through to Spain and Morocco, a journey which took him two years.

Returning to Germany, he studied abstract art at the Kunsthochschule (College of Art) in Krefeld, North Rhine-Westphalia, with Günther C. Kirchberger. Influenced by Joseph Kosuth and the conceptual art movement, he was invited in 1969, before graduating, to present his work at the avant-garde Galerie Denise René. (in 2014, these works were exhibited in the Objets ludiques exhibition at the Tinguely Museum in Basel.) After moving to Düsseldorf in 1971, he turned his attention to photography and worked for two years assisting German photographer Hans Lux, before opening his own studio in 1973. Becoming well known in his native country, he joined the Stern magazine family along with photographers Helmut Newton, Guy Bourdin and Hans Feurer.

== Career ==
=== Photography ===
Lindbergh shot the first U.S. Vogue cover under new editor-in-chief Anna Wintour for the magazine's November 1988 issue. A bold departure from the magazine's traditional look, it featured model Michaela Bercu posed outside, rather than in a studio, not looking directly at the camera. She is wearing a bejeweled Christian Lacroix T-shirt and the first pair of jeans to appear on the magazine's cover, swapped in at the last minute since Bercu's pregnancy made the skirt she was originally supposed to wear too tight.

In 1989, Linda Evangelista, Naomi Campbell, Tatjana Patitz, Cindy Crawford, and Christy Turlington, all young, little-known models, were photographed together for the first time by Lindbergh for the January 1990 British Vogue cover. It has been said that this photoshoot launched the era of the supermodel. The cover inspired singer George Michael to feature the models in the video for his song "Freedom! '90." Two years after Lindbergh's 1989 British Vogue cover shoot, Italian fashion designer Gianni Versace cast the same group of models—who by then were rapidly approaching supermodel status, if they hadn't already reached it—in Versace's Fall/Winter 1991 fashion show.

In a 2008 interview with art historian Charlotte Cotton, Lindbergh explained:

Using black-and-white photography was really important to creating the supermodel. Every time I tried to shoot them in colour, because their beauty was close to perfection, it ended up looking like a bad cosmetics advert. With black and white, you can really see who they are. It toned down the commercial interpretation that colour gives. What's so striking about black and white is how it really helps a sense of reality to come through.

Lindbergh's first book was 10 Women, which came out in 1996; as of 2008, more than 100,000 copies have sold. Images of Women, released in 1997 as Lindbergh's first comprehensive monograph, presented a milestone survey of portrait-oriented photographs that Lindbergh had taken over the previous ten years.

He twice photographed the Pirelli calendar, in 1996 and 2002. The latter, which used actresses instead of models for the first time, was shot on the backlot of Paramount Studios, and was described by art critic Germaine Greer as "Pirelli's most challenging calendar yet". Lindbergh was the first photographer in the 50-year history of the Pirelli calendar to be invited to photograph it for a third time, for its 2017 edition.

Lindbergh collaborated on two complete issues of Vogue photographed by him and his assistant, Jethro Gaines of J.Gaines Studio, one celebrating Vogue Germany's 30th anniversary in October 2009, and the other for Vogue Spain in December 2010.

The result of his collaboration over the years with Azzedine Alaïa is reflected in the book of photographs dedicated to the Tunisian designer with whom he had a great friendship. Both shared the same criteria on beauty and aesthetics, loving the color black and the role of freedom.

In 2015, Images of Women II: 2005-2014 was published as a sequel to 1997's Images of Women. In the text component of the book, Lindbergh wrote the following:

If photographers are responsible for creating or reflecting an image of women in society...then, I must say, there is only one way for the future, and this is to define women as strong and independent. This should be the responsibility of photographers today: to free women, and finally everyone, from the terror of youth and perfection.

In 2015, the journalist Suzy Menkes wrote of Peter Lindbergh's work, "Refusing to bow to glossy perfection is Peter Lindbergh's trademark – the essence of the images that look into each person's unvarnished soul, however familiar or famous the sitter." In 2016, speaking in Artforum, Lindbergh stated that: "A fashion photographer should contribute to defining the image of the contemporary woman or man in their time, to reflect a certain social or human reality. How surrealistic is today's commercial agenda to retouch all signs of life and of experience, to retouch the very personal truth of the face itself?"

=== Films ===
Directors' Cuts: The Reunion with Cindy Crawford and Lindbergh

Lindbergh directed a number of films and documentaries.

In 1991, Models, The Film was shot in New York and starred Linda Evangelista, Tatjana Patitz, Naomi Campbell, Cindy Crawford and Stephanie Seymour.

Inner Voices (1999) was a drama documentary examining self-expression in Lee Strasberg method acting. It won the Best Documentary Award at the Toronto International Film Festival (TIFF) in 2000.

Pina Bausch, Der Fensterputzer (2002) was an experimental film about his friend Pina Bausch.

In 2008 Lindbergh and Holly Fisher directed Everywhere at Once. Narrated by Jeanne Moreau, the film consists of refilmed Lindbergh photographs, many of them unpublished, interwoven with excerpts from Tony Richardson's 1966 film Mademoiselle. It had its world premiere at the Tribeca Film Festival in New York in 2008, after the Avant-premiere at the Cannes Film Festival in 2007.

Peter Lindbergh – Women's Stories (2019) was directed by Jean-Michel Vecchiet. It is a documentary film about Lindbergh's life and also features his first wife, Astrid Lindbergh.

=== Music ===
In 1983, Lindbergh photographed the movie poster for Tony Scott's movie The Hunger featuring David Bowie, Susan Sarandon and Catherine Deneuve, and the album cover for the soundtrack, In 2002 he made Pedro Almodóvar's movie poster for Talk To Her and in 2011 also for Charlotte Rampling's documentary The Look.

Lindbergh photographed many music record covers, among them Jane Birkin's 1985 single "Quoi"; Tina Turner's single "Foreign Affair" (1990) and album Foreign Affair (1989), and the videoclip for Turner's single "Missing You". Lindbergh shot covers for Sheryl Crow's The Globe Sessions (1998) and Beyoncé's album I Am... Sasha Fierce (2008). He directed the videoclip for Lionel Richie's single "The Last Party".

== Personal life ==
Lindbergh divorced his first wife Astrid, who appeared with him in the documentary Peter Lindbergh – Women's Stories. He later married Petra Sedlaczek. Lindbergh had four sons, Benjamin, Jérémy, Simon, Joseph and seven grandchildren.

He died on 3 September 2019 in Paris, at age 74. A funeral mass was held at Saint-Sulpice church in Paris; among the guests were Carla Bruni, Charlotte Rampling, Anna Wintour, Kate Moss, Naomi Campbell, Julianne Moore, Salma Hayek and François-Henri Pinault.

== Exhibitions ==
- Models As Muse, The Metropolitan Museum of Art, 2009.
- On Street, C/O Berlin, 2010.
- The Unknown, Ullens Center for Contemporary Art, Beijing, China, April–May 2011. Lindbergh's installation, curated by Jerome Sans. There were more than 70,000 visitors.
- The Unknown and Images of Women, Meštrović Pavilion HDLU Museum, Zagreb, April–May 2014.
- Vogue Like a Painting, Thyssen-Bornemisza Museum, Madrid, June–October 2015. Lindbergh's still lifes and portraits were exhibited along with work by Irving Penn, Horst P. Horst and Erwin Blumenfeld.
- Gagosian Paris, September–December 2014
- Gagosian Athens, February–April 2016.
- A Different Vision on Fashion Photography, Kunsthal in Rotterdam, September 2016 to February 2017. A major retrospective. Includes work from previously unseen material from personal notes, storyboards, props, polaroids, contact sheets and films to monumental prints. It was then presented at the Kunsthalle München in Germany (under the title "From Fashion To Reality") and at the Reggia di Venaria in Turin. This travelling exhibition has been seen by over 400,000 people overall.
- Lightness of Being, Fotografiska Stockholm, 2023.
- Lightness of Being, Fotografiska Tallinn, 2023.

== Filmography ==
- 1991: Models: the Film — directed by Lindbergh
- 1999: Inner Voices — 30-minute drama documentary directed by Lindbergh
- 2001: Pina Bausch – Der Fensterputzer — 30-minute film directed by Lindbergh
- 2008: Everywhere at Once — directed by Lindbergh and Holly Fisher
- 2019: Peter Lindbergh — Women's Stories — documentary based on Lindbergh's life, directed by Jean-Michel Vecchiet

== Awards ==
- 1996: Lucky Strike Designer Award from the Raymond Loewy Foundation.
- 2014: Honoured for his longtime contributions to AIDS awareness at the annual amfAR New York Gala at Cipriani Wall Street.

== Publications ==
=== Major publications ===
- 10 Women. Schirmer / Mosel, 1996. ISBN 978-3-8238-1416-0. With a foreword by Karl Lagerfeld. Photographs of Kate Moss, Christy Turlington, Linda Evangelista, Cindy Crawford, Amber Valletta, Naomi Campbell, Helena Christensen, Claudia Schiffer, Kristen McMenamy and Tatjana Patitz.
- Images de Women. Schirmer / Mosel, 1997. ISBN 978-3-8296-0143-6. With an introduction by Martin Harrison.
- Portfolio. Assouline, 1999. ISBN 2-84323-108-6. With an interview by Dr. Antonio Ria.
- Stories. Arena editions USA, 2002. ISBN 1-892041-64-2. With a foreword by Wim Wenders.
- Untitled 116. Schirmer / Mosel, 2006. ISBN 3-8296-0179-4.
- On Street. C/O Berlin, 2010. ISBN 978-3-8296-0506-9.
- The Unknown. Schirmer / Mosel, 2011. ISBN 978-3-8296-0544-1. With an interview by Jérôme Sans.
- Images of Women 2. Schirmer / Mosel, 2014. ISBN 978-3829606851. With an introduction by Werner Spies, Wim Wenders and Peter Handke,
- A Different History of Fashion by Lindbergh. Taschen, 2016. ISBN 978-3-8365-5282-0. With an introduction by Thierry-Maxime Loriot.
- Peter Lindbergh. Shadows on the Wall. Taschen, 2017. ISBN 978-3-8365-6937-8.

=== Other publications ===
- Stern Fotografie - Smoking Women - Portfolio N°5. teNeues, 1996. ISBN 978-3570122990.
- Stern Fotografie - Invasion - Portfolio N°29. teNeues, 2002. ISBN 978-3570193471.
- I Grandi Fotografi of Corriere Della Sera. 2006. Part of the series with Man Ray, Robert Mapplethorpe, Helmut Newton, Henri Cartier-Bresson.
- Stern Fotografie Portfolio N° 47. teNeues, 2007. ISBN 978-3-570-19733-2.
- Peter Lindbergh:100 photos pour la liberté de la presse. Reporters Without Borders, 2014. ISBN 978-2362200267. A magazine.
