= Fashion for Relief =

International charity

Fashion For Relief (FFR)
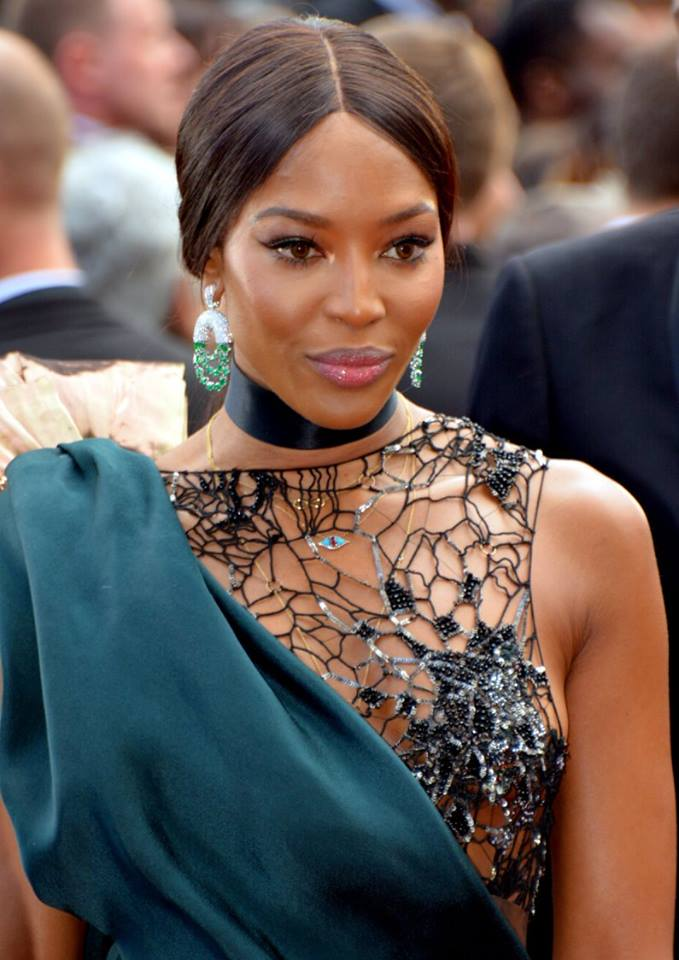
- Naomi Campbell Cannes 2018
- Established: 19 January 2015 (registered)
- Dissolved: 15 March 2024 (Closed)
- Location(s): London and Swansea, United Kingdom
- Chairperson: Naomi Campbell
- Directors: Veronica Chou; Bianka Hellmich
- Revenue: £610,704 (2018)
- Disbursements: £363,946 (2018)
- Website: www.fashionforrelief.org

Fashion for Relief was a charitable organization that raised funds for various environmental and humanitarian causes. Fashion Relief closed on 15 March 2024 following a statement from the Charity Commission for England and Wales.

== History ==
In 2005, Naomi Campbell founded two charities, We Love Brazil and Fashion for Relief. Fund-raising fashion shows were hosted in Cannes, Dar es Salaam, London, Moscow, Mumbai and New York City.

In 2005, the London-based non-profit organization CARE hosted Fashion for Relief, donating to international charitable organizations to bring aid to people in crises in various countries.

From 2012 until 2024, the online retailer YOOX partnered with Fashion for Relief. In 2015, Campbell applied for non-profit status in the United Kingdom.

On 8 November 2021, the Charity Commission for England and Wales announced it was opening a statutory inquiry into Fashion for Relief. On 15 December 2023, the Commission issued a statement announcing its intention "to dissolve [the] CIO," with Fashion for Relief ultimately closing on 15 March 2024.

Following the launch of the Charity Commission investigation into Fashion Relief, Campbell was removed as a trustee from the charity in 2023. In September 2024, Campbell was banned from serving as a charity trustee in the UK for 5 years after the investigation found Fashion Relief spent only 8.5% of its income on charitable grants, while making unauthorised payments to other trustees and advisors.

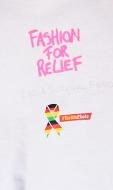
Fashion for relief

Runway celebrities

- Tyson Beckford
- Justin Bieber
- Naomi Campbell
- Jourdan Dunn
- Sarah Ferguson
- Jane Fonda
- Toni Garrn
- Brad Goreski
- Paris Hilton
- Kate Moss
- Annabelle Neilson
- Kelly Osbourne
- Alexandra Richards
- Nicole Richie
- Michelle Rodriguez
- Kendall Jenner
- Heidi Klum
- Gigi Hadid
- Bella Hadid
- Natalia Vodianova

== Fellowship Award ==
- 2017 - Queen Rania Al Abdullah

== Relief causes ==
- 2005 – Hurricane Katrina
- 2007 – British Summer Floods
- 2008 – Whitechapel Mission
- 2009 – White Ribbon’s Alliance – Tanzania; Citizens for Justice and Peace (Mumbai)
- 2010 – White Ribbon’s Alliance – Haiti
- 2011 – Japan Red Cross – earthquake and tsunami
- 2012 – Udayan Care – India
- 2013 – Typhoon Haiyan – Philippines
- 2015 – Disasters Emergency Committee – Ebola
- 2017 – Refugee Children – Cannes
- 2018 – Time's Up Race to Equality, #MeToo movement and Save the Children – Cannes
- 2019 – Mayor's Fund for London – London
- 2020-2021 – COVID-19 online campaign
- 2022 – UNICEF – London
