= Naomi Campbell =

British model (born 1970)

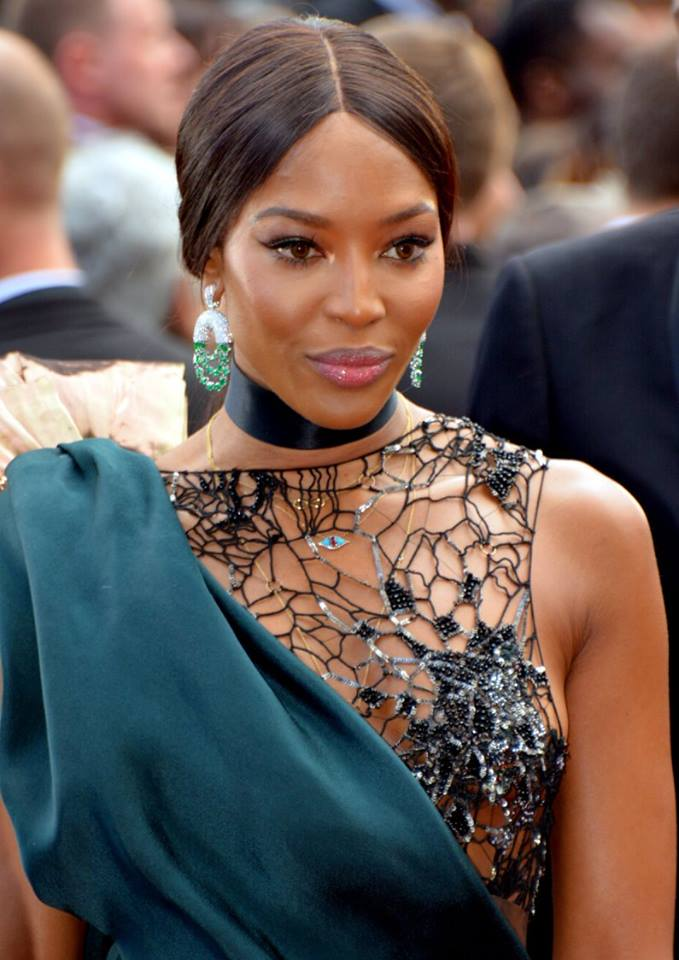
- Campbell at the 2018 Cannes Film Festival
- Born: Naomi Elaine Campbell; 22 May 1970 (age 56); London, England
- Education: Italia Conti Academy of Theatre Arts
- Occupations: Model; actress; media personality; singer
- Years active: 1978–present
- Children: 2
- Modelling information
- Height: 5 ft 10 in (1.78 m)
- Hair colour: Black
- Eye colour: Brown
- Agency: Women Management (New York, Milan); ZZO (Paris); Perspective Management (London); Priscilla's Model Management (Sydney)
- Musical career
- Genre: R&B
- Instruments: Vocals
- Label: Epic

Naomi Elaine Campbell (born 22 May 1970) is an English model and actress. Beginning her career at the age of eight, Campbell was one of six models of her generation who were declared supermodels by the fashion industry and the international press. She was the first black woman to appear as a model on the covers of Time and Vogue France.

In addition to her modelling career, Campbell has embarked on other ventures, including an R&B studio album and several acting appearances in film and television. She hosted the modelling-competition reality television show The Face and its international offshoots. Campbell is also involved in charity work for various causes, although she was banned from being a trustee of any charity in the United Kingdom for five years in September 2024 following a financial misconduct investigation.

== Early life and education ==
Naomi Elaine Campbell was born on 22 May 1970 in Lambeth, South London, to Jamaican-born dancer Valerie Morris. Per her mother's wishes, Campbell never met her father, who had abandoned her mother when she was four months pregnant and went unnamed on her birth certificate. She took the surname "Campbell" from her mother's second marriage. Her half-brother, Pierre, was born in 1985. Campbell is of Afro-Jamaican and Chinese-Jamaican descent. Her Chinese heritage comes through her paternal grandmother, whose surname was Ming.

Campbell spent her early years in Rome, Italy, where her mother worked as a modern dancer. On their return to London, she lived with relatives while her mother travelled across Europe with the dance troupe Fantastica. From the age of three, Campbell attended the Barbara Speake Stage School and at age 10, she was accepted into the Italia Conti Academy of Theatre Arts, where she studied ballet. She also attended Dunraven School.

== Career ==
=== 1978–1986: Career beginnings ===
In 1978 at age 8, Campbell made her first public appearance in the music video for Bob Marley's "Is This Love" at the Keskidee, a Black-led arts and theatre centre in London. She tap-danced in 1983 in the music video for Culture Club's "I'll Tumble 4 Ya" and "Mistake No. 3", in 1984. She had studied dance from age 3 to 16, and originally intended to be a dancer. In 1986, while still a student of the Italia Conti Academy of Theatre Arts, Campbell was scouted by Beth Boldt, head of the Synchro Model Agency, while window-shopping in Covent Garden. In April, just before her 16th birthday she appeared on the cover of British Elle.

=== 1987–1997 Supermodel status ===
Over the next few years, Campbell walked the catwalk for such designers as Gianni Versace, Azzedine Alaïa, and Isaac Mizrahi and posed for such photographers as Peter Lindbergh, Herb Ritts, and Bruce Weber. By the late 1980s, Campbell, with Christy Turlington and Linda Evangelista, had formed a trio known as the "Trinity", who became the most recognisable and in-demand models of their generation.

When faced with racial discrimination, Campbell received support from her white friends; she later quoted Turlington and Evangelista as telling Dolce & Gabbana, "If you don't use Naomi, you don't get us." In December 1987, she appeared on the cover of British Vogue, as that publication's first black cover girl since 1966. In August 1988, she became the first black model to appear on the cover of French Vogue, after designer Yves St. Laurent threatened to withdraw his advertising from the magazine if it didn't place Naomi on its cover. The following year, she appeared on the cover of American Vogue, which marked the first time a black model graced the front of the September magazine, traditionally the year's biggest and most important issue.

In January 1990, Campbell, who was declared "the reigning megamodel of them all" by Interview, appeared with Turlington, Evangelista, Cindy Crawford and Tatjana Patitz on a cover of British Vogue, shot by Peter Lindbergh. The group was subsequently cast to star in the music video for George Michael's "Freedom! '90". By then, Campbell, Turlington, Evangelista, Crawford and Claudia Schiffer were called "supermodels" by the fashion industry. With the addition of newcomer Kate Moss, they were collectively known as the "Big Six".

In March 1991, Campbell walked the catwalk for Versace with Turlington, Evangelista and Crawford, arm-in-arm and lip-synching the words to "Freedom! '90". In March 1992, she starred as Michael Jackson's love interest in the music video for "In the Closet". In April 1992, she posed with several other models for the hundredth-anniversary cover of American Vogue, shot by Patrick Demarchelier. That same year, she appeared in Madonna's controversial book Sex, in a set of nude photos with Madonna and rapper Big Daddy Kane.

In 1993, Campbell twice appeared on the cover of American Vogue; in April, alongside Christy Turlington, Claudia Schiffer, Stephanie Seymour and Helena Christensen, and again, solo, in June. She also fell on the Vivienne Westwood 1993 Fall catwalk in foot-high platform shoes, which were later displayed at the Victoria and Albert Museum in London. Despite her success, Elite Model Management, which had represented Campbell since 1987, dropped her contract.

In 1996, Campbell walked in the second-ever Victoria Secret Fashion Show and made history as the first black model to open the show. She went on to grace the show's catwalk seven times. Her last catwalk for the brand was in 2005. When asked why she never became a full-time Angel, the supermodel simply stated: "[They] could not afford me".

In 1997, Campbell became the first black woman ever to open a Prada show.

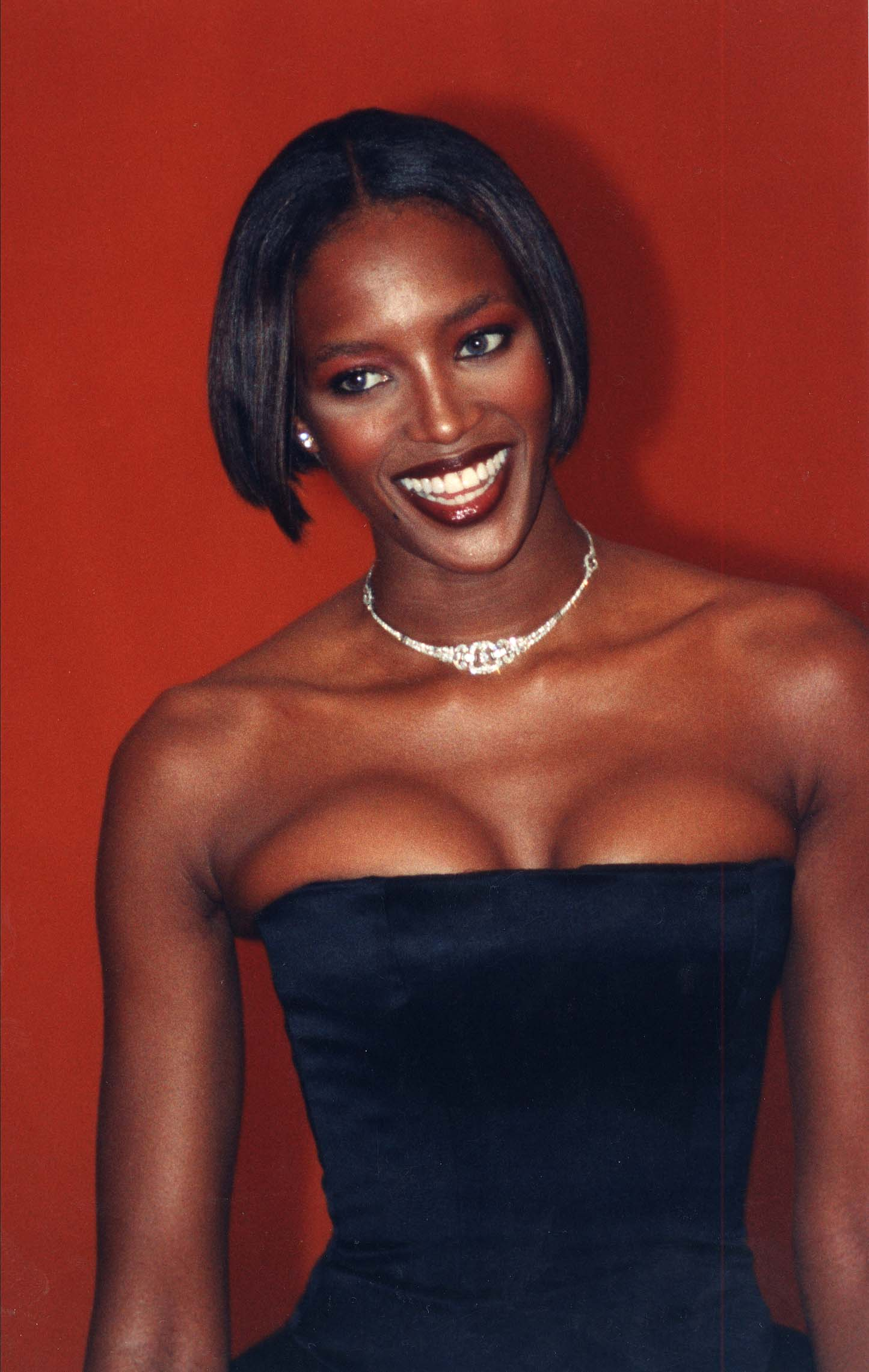
Campbell at Bill Clinton's inauguration party in 1997

In the mid-1990s, Campbell branched out into other areas of the entertainment industry. Her novel Swan, about a supermodel dealing with blackmail, was released in 1994. It was ghostwritten by Caroline Upcher, with Campbell stating that she "just did not have the time to sit down and write a book." That same year, she released her album Babywoman, which was named after designer Rifat Ozbek's nickname for Campbell. Produced by Youth and Tim Simenon, the album was only commercially successful in Japan, with its only single, "Love and Tears", reaching No. 40 on the charts. Babywoman was mocked by critics, inspiring the Naomi Awards. During the mid-1990s, Campbell also had small roles in Miami Rhapsody and Spike Lee's Girl 6, as well as a recurring role on the second season of New York Undercover.

=== 1998–2012: Other ventures ===
In 1998, Time declared the end of the supermodel era. Campbell continued modelling, both on the catwalk and, more frequently, in print. In 1999, she signed her first cosmetics contract with Cosmopolitan Cosmetics, a division of Wella, through which she launched several signature fragrances. In November of that year, she posed with 12 other top models for the "Modern Muses" cover of the Millennium Issue of American Vogue, shot by Annie Leibovitz. The following month, she appeared in a white string bikini and furs on the cover of Playboy. In September 2000 she became the first black model on the cover for Vogue Russia. The cover was shot by photographer Robin Derrick, who was also the creative director for British Vogue at the time. In May 2001, she hosted, alongside supermodel Elle Macpherson, the 50th Miss Universe pageant. In October 2001, she appeared with rapper Sean "Puff Daddy" Combs on the cover of British Vogue, with the headline "Naomi and Puff: The Ultimate Power Duo".

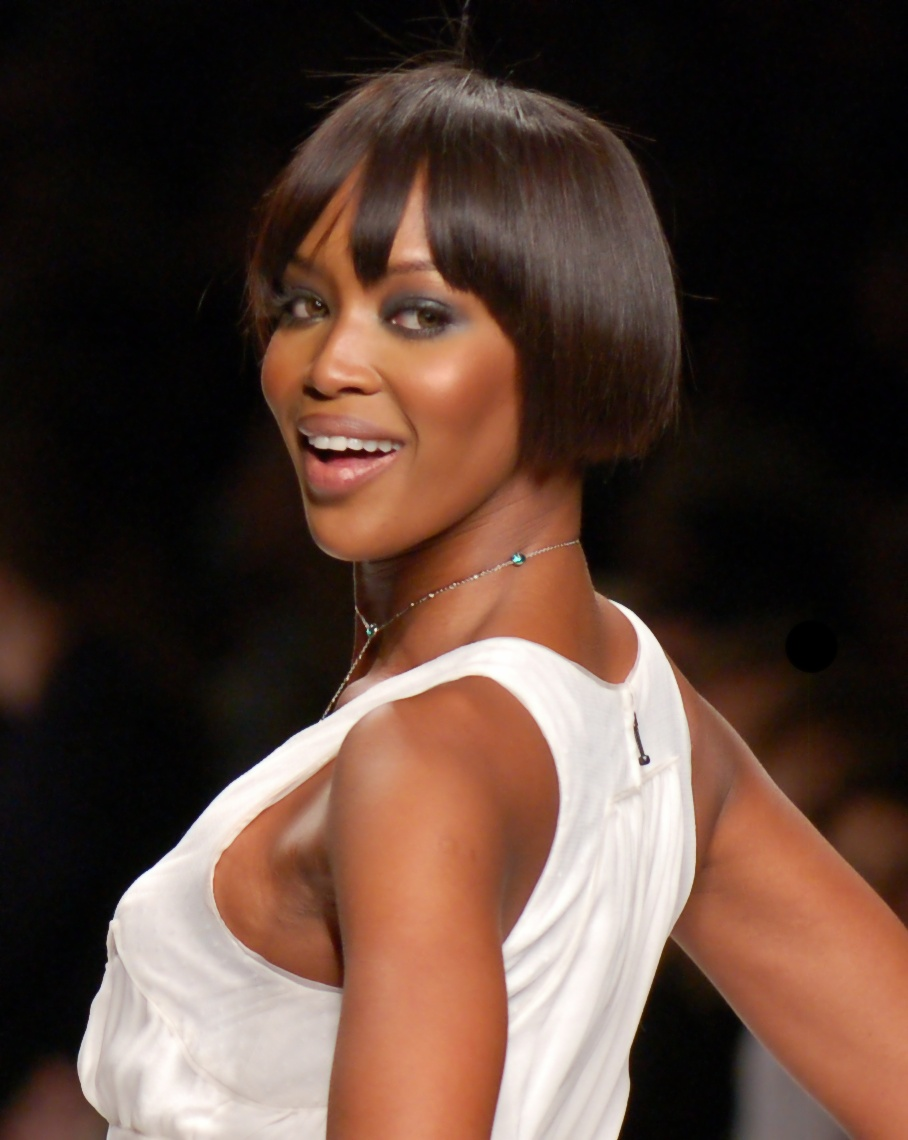
Campbell on the catwalk for Peter Som in 2007

In 2007, she walked the catwalk for Dior's 60th-anniversary fashion show at Versailles. In July 2008, she appeared with fellow black models Liya Kebede, Sessilee Lopez and Jourdan Dunn on the gatefold cover of a landmark all-black issue of Italian Vogue, shot by Steven Meisel. In September of that year, Campbell reunited with Christy Turlington, Linda Evangelista, Cindy Crawford, Claudia Schiffer and Stephanie Seymour for "A League of Their Own", a Vanity Fair feature on the supermodel legacy.

In 2011, Campbell appeared with Liya Kebede and Iman on the cover of the 40th-anniversary issue of Essence. She also starred as Duran Duran frontman Simon Le Bon in the band's music video for "Girl Panic!", with Cindy Crawford, Helena Christensen, Eva Herzigova and Yasmin Le Bon portraying the other band members; they appeared in the November edition of British Harper's Bazaar in an editorial titled "The Supers vs. Duran Duran". Campbell performed with Kate Moss and other supermodels in the closing ceremony of the 2012 Olympic Games, where they modelled haute couture to represent British fashion. Campbell wore a design by Alexander McQueen—a staggered hem gown with a train speckled with flecks of gold.

=== 2013–2020 ===
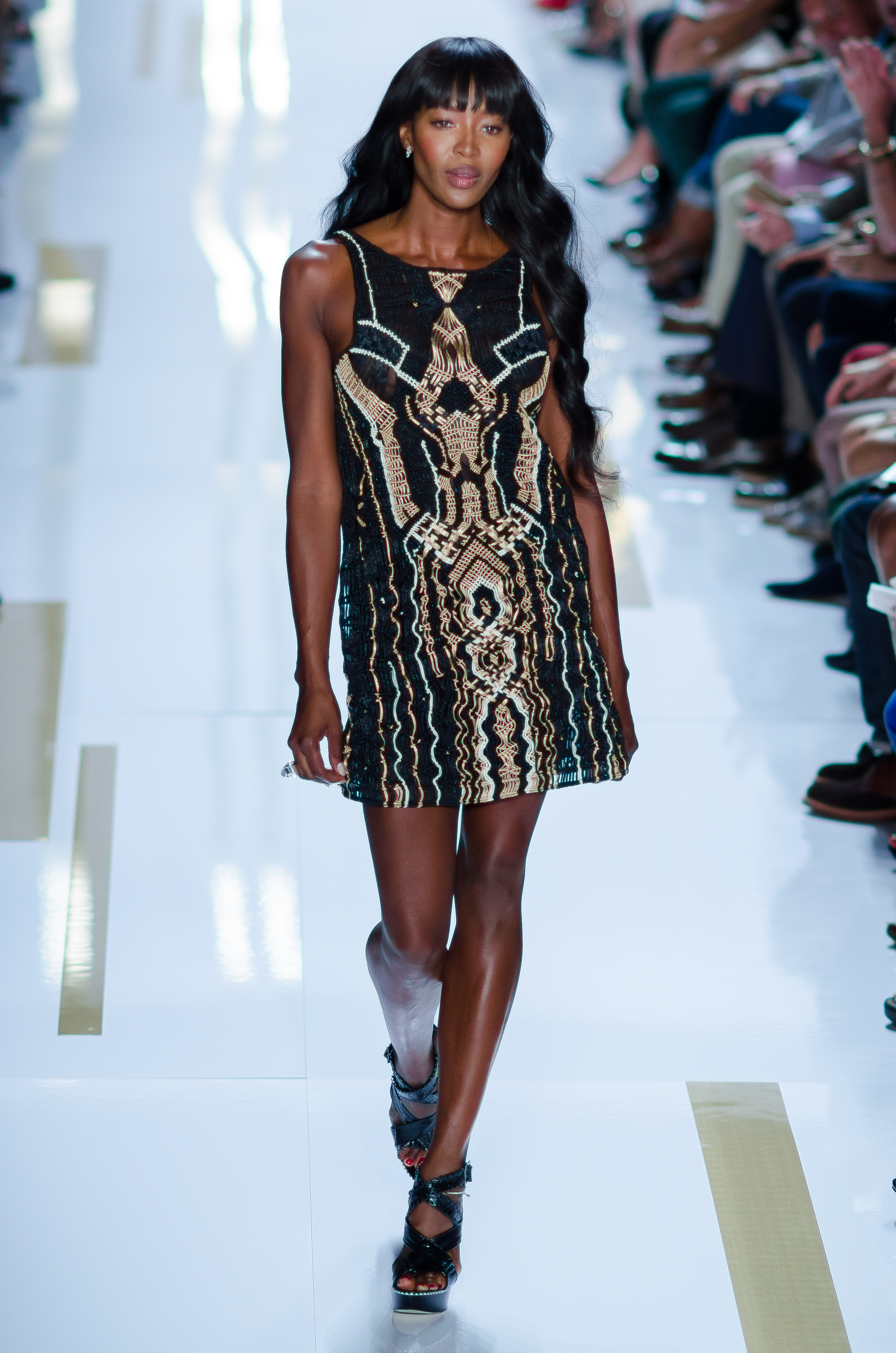
Campbell walking the catwalk at the Diane von Fürstenberg Spring/Summer 2014 show at New York Fashion Week, September 2013

In March 2013, Campbell appeared on the inaugural cover of Numéro Russia. Campbell also became involved in reality television through the modelling competition The Face and its international offshoots. In the U.S., she served as a coach and judge, along with Karolina Kurkova and Coco Rocha, on Oxygen's The Face, hosted by photographer Nigel Barker. She also hosted the British version of the show, which aired on Sky Living later that same year, and The Face Australia, which ran on Fox8 in 2014.

In 2014, Campbell covered the May issue of Vogue Australia, the September issue of Vogue Japan, and the November issue of Vogue Turkey; the latter two were special editions celebrating Campbell and fellow supermodels. Campbell also covered the Vietnamese, Singaporean and the 35th anniversary Latin American edition of Harper's Bazaar. In 2014, Campbell was named TV Personality of the year by Glamour Magazine. The award was presented at London's annual Glamour Women of the Year Awards. The following year, she closed the Fall/Winter Zac Posen show at New York Fashion Week, and featured in Spring/Summer 2015 campaigns for Burberry and lingerie retailer Agent Provocateur.

In 2015, Campbell signed on as a recurring character in the Fox drama Empire as Camilla Marks, a fashion designer and love interest to Hakeem Lyon, portrayed by Bryshere Y. Gray. In October 2015, Campbell was featured in a two-episode arc in American Horror Story: Hotel, as a Vogue fashion editor named Claudia Bankson. In 2016, Campbell was cast as a recurring character Rose Crane, mother of Alexandra Crane played by Ryan Destiny, and wife of Ronald Crane played by Lenny Kravitz, in Fox newest musical drama Star (TV series). In 2016, Campbell appeared in the music video for Anohni's single "Drone Bomb Me". In September 2017, Campbell appeared in Versace's Spring/Summer 2018 show celebrating the late Gianni Versace, alongside Schiffer, Crawford, Christensen, and Carla Bruni and also featured in the campaign for the collection. In February 2018, Campbell and Moss returned to the catwalk and closed Kim Jones' final menswear show for Louis Vuitton. In April, she featured on the cover of British GQ alongside rapper Skepta. In June 2018, Campbell received the Fashion Icon award by the Council of Fashion Designers of America. In 2019, Campbell received the first beauty contract of her career, with NARS Cosmetics.

In the spring of 2020, amid the COVID-19 pandemic, Campbell began her web series on YouTube, No Filter with Naomi, in which she conducts conversations with various guests. Her inaugural guest was Cindy Crawford, while subsequent guests ranged from Marc Jacobs, Adut Akech, and Christy Turlington to Ashley Graham and Nicole Richie. The 50th episode of No Filter with Naomi premiered on 16 March 2021, featuring guest Jean Paul Gaultier. Campbell signed with Studio71 in August 2020; under this partnership, Studio71 curates her content concerning ad sales, channel optimisation, and brand partnerships across various platforms including YouTube and Facebook.

==== Wikipedia page white washing ====
The public relations firm Sunshine Sachs, hired by Campbell, committed undisclosed paid editing on Campbell's Wikipedia page. In these edits, references to her album Babywoman and her relationship with Mike Tyson were white washed.

=== 2021–present ===
On 12 January 2021, Campbell was appointed as a tourism ambassador by the Kenyan Ministry of Tourism and Wildlife. In February, Campbell appeared on the cover of i-D's spring issue, describing it as one of the few times she's had the opportunity to work with a photographer of colour. The following month, Campbell was named as the face of the relaunch advertising campaign for streetwear brand Hood by Air. In July 2022, Campbell was awarded an honorary doctorate by UCA (University for the Creative Arts) in the south of London for her impact on global fashion.

Campbell executive produced the film Invisible Beauty about Bethann Hardison, which premiered at the 2023 Sundance Film Festival. Victoria's Secret revealed the Icon Collection in August 2023, which features Campbell along with Gisele Bündchen and Candice Swanepoel. Photographed by Mikael Jansson, the campaign features familiar faces from the '90s and 2000s, as well as new model-ambassadors Paloma Elsesser, Adut Akech, Emily Ratajkowski, and Hailey Bieber. The same month, Hugo Boss launched its new collection, featuring Campbell (dubbed as "Queen Boss"), Suki Waterhouse, Matteo Berrettini, and Lee Min-ho in its campaign. On 5 September 2023, Campbell debuted her new collaboration with PrettyLittleThing during a catwalk show to kick off New York Fashion Week. The collection was designed by Campbell as well as designers Victor Anate and Edvin Thompson.

Campbell is featured in the 2023 four-part Apple TV+ docuseries titled The Super Models. The series also features Cindy Crawford, Christy Turlington, and Linda Evangelista and is directed by Roger Ross Williams and Larissa Bills. Campbell has been a special advisor to the music company Gamma, founded by Apple Music executive Larry Jackson, since 2023.

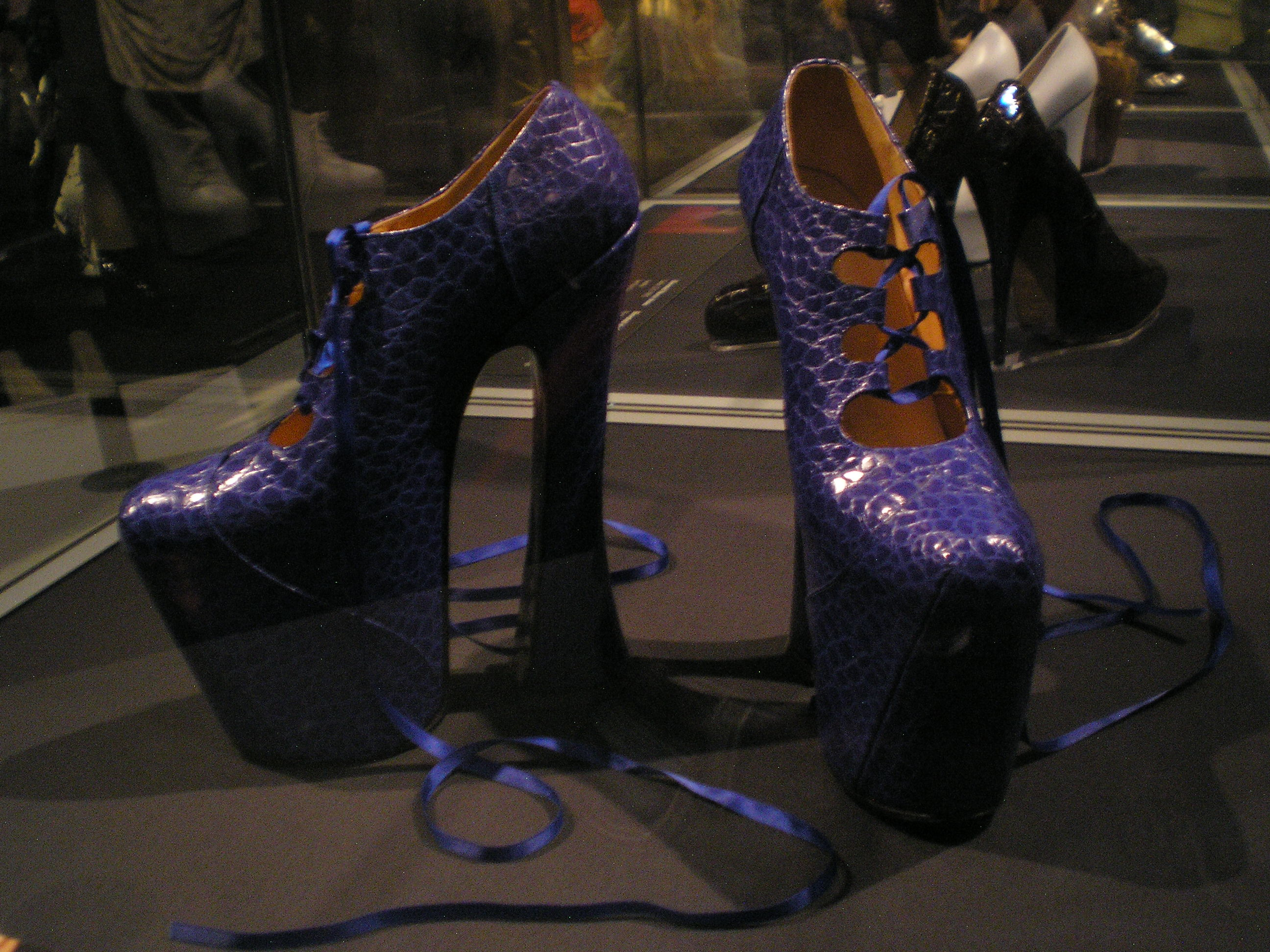
Vivienne Westwood-designed shoes worn by Campbell on display at an exhibition in Sheffield, England

In June 2024, the Victoria and Albert Museum in London launched a solo exhibition titled "Naomi: In Fashion", which highlighted Campbell's philanthropic work and activism. The exhibit opens with personal images from Campbell's archive and also displays 100 curated outfits she has worn throughout her modelling years.

As of 2024, Campbell has walked the catwalks and appeared in advertising campaigns for Marc Jacobs, Yves Saint Laurent, Chloé, Diane Von Furstenberg, Prada, Chanel, Givenchy, Dolce & Gabbana, Burberry, Zac Posen, Blumarine, Karl Lagerfeld, Gianfranco Ferré, Versace, Helmut Lang, Christian Dior, John Galliano, Ralph Lauren, Jean Paul Gaultier, Tommy Hilfiger, Oscar de la Renta, Michael Kors, Anna Sui, Louis Vuitton, Hermés, Marchesa, Roberto Cavalli, Valentino, Fendi, Escada, Isaac Mizrahi, La Perla, Philipp Plein, Mango, Thierry Mugler, Balmain, Nars, David Yurman, Alessandro Dell'Acqua, DSquared2, Express, H&M, Bloomingdale's, Dillard's, Neiman Marcus, Gap, Avon, Revlon and Victoria's Secret.

== Recognition, activism and charity work ==
Despite her status as the most famous Black model of her time, Campbell never earned the same volume of advertising assignments as her white colleagues, and she was not signed by a cosmetics company until as late as 1999. In 1991, she said, "I may be considered one of the top models in the world, but in no way do I make the same money as any of them." Throughout her career, Campbell has been outspoken against the racial bias that exists in the fashion industry. In 1997, she stated, "There is prejudice. It is a problem and I can't go along any more with brushing it under the carpet. This business is about selling, and blonde and blue-eyed girls are what sells."

A decade later, she again spoke out against discrimination, stating, "The American president may be Black, but as a Black woman, I am still an exception in this business. I always have to work harder to be treated equally." In 2013, Campbell joined fellow Black models Iman and Bethann Hardison in an advocacy group called "Diversity Coalition". In an open letter to the governing bodies of global fashion weeks, they named high-profile designers who used just one or no models of colour in their Autumn 2013 shows, calling it a "racist act".

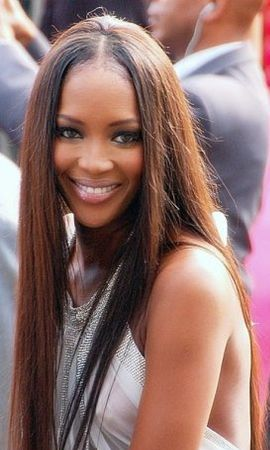
Campbell at the 2008 Cannes Film Festival

Campbell is involved with several charitable causes. She supports the Nelson Mandela Children's Fund, for which she organised a benefit Versace fashion show in 1998. Held at Nelson Mandela's South African presidential residence, the show was the subject of a documentary titled FashionKingdom, or alternatively, Naomi Conquers Africa. Campbell, whose mother has battled breast cancer, also supports Breakthrough Breast Cancer. In 2004, she was featured on FHM's charity single Da Ya Think I'm Sexy?, as well as in the accompanying music video, of which all profits were donated to Breakthrough. She appeared in a print and media campaign for the charity's fundraising initiative Fashion Targets Breast Cancer. She opened a Breakthrough breast cancer research unit in 2009.

In 2005, Campbell founded the charity We Love Brazil, which aims to raise awareness and funds to fight poverty in Brazil through the sale of fabrics made by local women.

That same year, Campbell founded the charity Fashion for Relief, which has organised fund-raising fashion shows to benefit victims of Hurricane Katrina in 2005, the Mumbai terrorist attacks in 2008, the Haiti earthquake in 2010, the Japan earthquake in 2011, and the Syrian refugee crisis in 2017. By 2011, Fashion For Relief had reportedly raised £4.5 million. In 2018 Campbell held another Relief charity gala and the theme was Race To Equality. Following the launch of a Charity Commission investigation into Fashion Relief in 2021, Campbell was removed as a trustee from the charity in 2023, with Fashion For Relief eventually being closed by the Charity Commission on 15 March 2024.

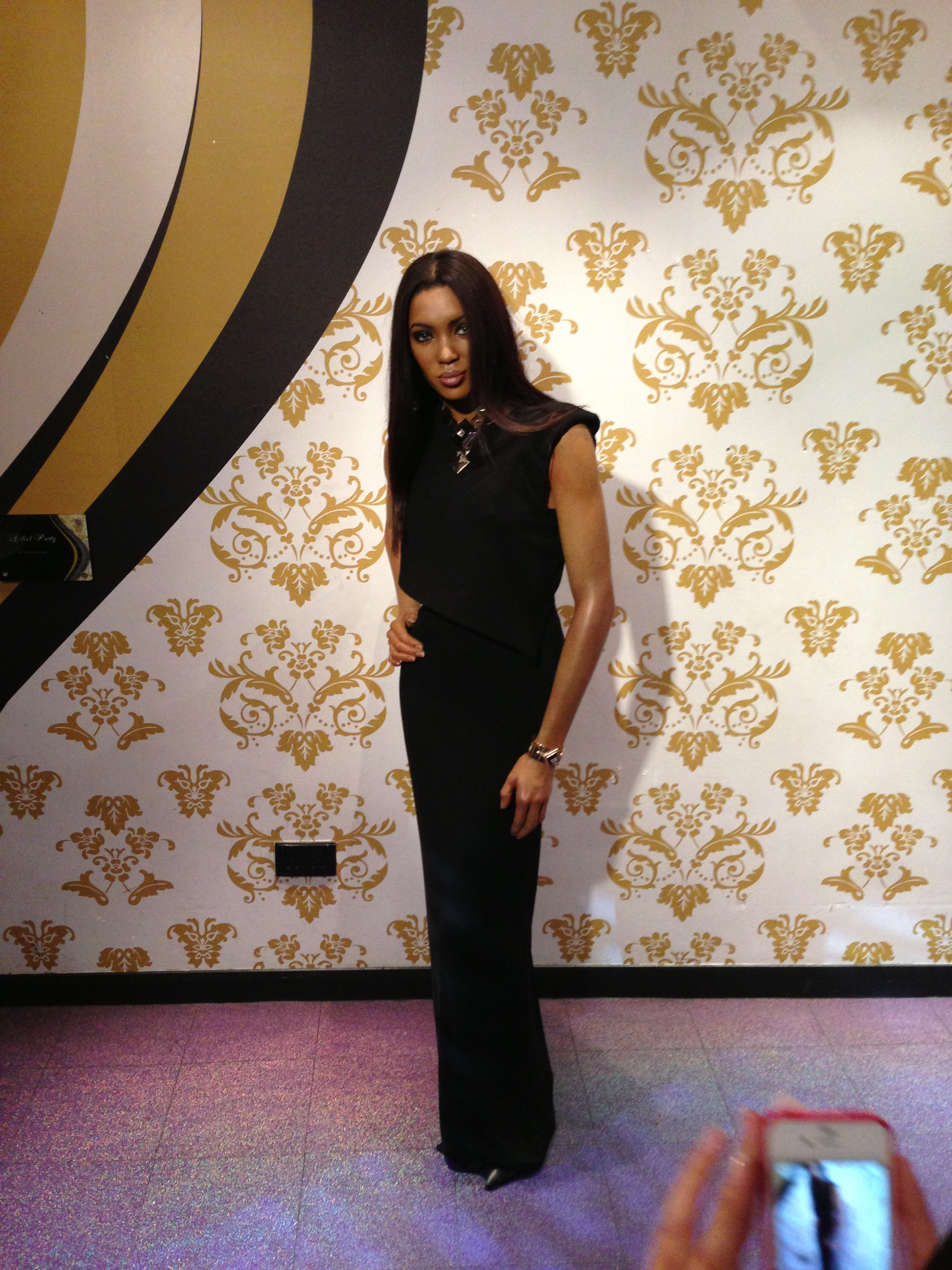
Waxwork of Campbell at Madame Tussauds, London

In November 2010, Campbell and her then partner Vladislav Doronin were among the organisers of the Help the Tiger charity event, which took place at the Mikhailovsky Theatre in Saint Petersburg, Russia, and which was attended by Leonardo DiCaprio and Vladimir Putin.

In 2012, the charity teamed up with YOOX China and leading global and Chinese fashion designers, including Phillip Lim and Masha Ma, to design Chinese-themed T-shirts to help fund its efforts and the various international charities it works with. Since 2007, Campbell has been the honorary president of Athla Onlus, an Italian organisation that works to further the social integration of young people with learning disabilities. In 2009, Campbell became a goodwill ambassador for the White Ribbon Alliance for Safe Motherhood. She has since joined the charity's patron, Sarah Brown, the wife of former British prime minister Gordon Brown, on several missions to promote maternal health.

Campbell has received recognition for her charitable work. In 2007, she was named an ambassador of Rio de Janeiro by Mayor Cesar Maia in recognition of her efforts to fight poverty in Brazil. In 2009, she was awarded Honorary Patronage of Trinity College's University Philosophical Society for her charitable and professional work. In 2010, Sarah Brown presented her with an "Outstanding Contribution" award from British Elle for her work as an ambassador for the White Ribbon Alliance, as well as her work in the fashion industry. In 2016, amfAR honoured Campbell for her 31 years working with the foundation to fund AIDS research.

In February 2021, Campbell was a signatory on an open letter decrying Ghana's stance on gay rights. She was joined by other signers, like actor Idris Elba and British Vogue magazine editor-in-chief Edward Enninful.

In July 2021, Campbell condemned racist attacks on black players for the England national football team, including Bukayo Saka, Marcus Rashford and Jadon Sancho, after the team's defeat to Italy in the UEFA Euro 2020 soccer final, disclosing via an Instagram post that it was disgusting to read of the abuses and encouraging players not to let the ignorant voices in. In the same month, Campbell wrote an open letter to former South African president Jacob Zuma, condemning riots and unrest that had broken out in the country following Zuma's incarceration. For 2023, the Centre for Advanced Studies of Fundamental Human Rights, with the approval of the African Fashion Gate President, Hon. Makaziwe Mandela, has conferred La Moda Veste la Pace Award on Naomi Elaine Campbell. The awards ceremony was celebrated in Rome at the seat of the Italian Delegation of the European Commission.

=== Banned as charity trustee ===
In September 2024, Campbell was banned from serving as a charity trustee in the UK for five years after an investigation found "multiple instances of misconduct and / or mismanagement" including that between April 2016 and July 2022, Fashion for Relief spent only 8.5% of its income on charitable grants, while making unauthorised payments to other trustees and advisors. These included paying for Campbell's stay at a five-star hotel in Cannes, France, as well as spa treatments, room service, security and cigarettes.

The charity was reported to the Charity Commission after Fashion for Relief held an event at the British Museum in 2019 claimed to be held in partnership with UNICEF. UNICEF said it was unaware of the event, was never a partner of Fashion for Relief, and received no money from the charity. Question was also raised as to why Campbell was described as a UNICEF "envoy" when she held no official role with UNICEF. Save the Children Fund and the Mayor's Fund for London also made complaints to the commission over the charity's failure to fully pay them proceeds from events held in 2017 and 2018. A sum of £345,000 has since been recovered from the charity and donated to the two organisations. Campbell appealed against the ban, saying that she was a "victim of fraud and forgery" and "concerted deception" by a fellow trustee, and that she has "never undertaken philanthropic work for personal gain".

== Legal issues ==
Campbell has been convicted of five counts of assault on four occasions between 1998 and 2015. In September 1998 she was convicted of assaulting her personal assistant. She pleaded guilty to assaulting her former housekeeper in January 2007. She attended her community service wearing designer outfits, including fedoras, furs and a silver-sequinned $300,000 Dolce & Gabbana gown upon completion of her sentence. Campbell detailed her community service experience in a W feature titled "The Naomi Diaries", and subsequently spoofed herself in a Dunkin' Donuts commercial, directed by Zach Braff. In June 2008 she was sentenced for assaulting two police officers at London Heathrow Airport. In July 2015 she was found guilty of assaulting a paparazzo in Rome.

== Personal life ==
In a 2010 interview for British Vogue, Campbell stated that in 1999 she entered rehabilitation for cocaine addiction and then she joined Alcoholics Anonymous to get sober. She stopped drinking around 2012.

=== Family and relationships ===
Campbell has never met her biological father. She regarded French-based Tunisian fashion designer Azzedine Alaïa, whom she met at 16, as her "papa". She also holds high respect for record producers Quincy Jones and Chris Blackwell as adopted father figures. Former South African president Nelson Mandela referred to Campbell as his "honorary granddaughter". She first met Mandela in November 1994, after his party, the African National Congress, invited her to travel to South Africa to meet with their leader. She had previously donated the proceeds from a photo shoot in Tanzania to the ANC. Over the years, Campbell has lent support to many of Mandela's political campaigns and humanitarian causes.

In 1993, she became engaged to U2 bassist Adam Clayton. They met in February of that year, after Clayton, when asked in an interview if there was anything in the world he desired but did not have, responded: "A date with Naomi Campbell". Campbell and Clayton separated the following year. In 1995, she dated Leonardo DiCaprio. From 1998 to 2003, she was in a relationship with Formula One team principal Flavio Briatore; they were engaged. Campbell now considers Briatore her "mentor". From 2008 until 2013, she was in a relationship with Russian real estate developer and art collector Vladislav Doronin. She also had relationships with Robert De Niro, Hassan Jameel, Sean "Diddy" Combs, and Usher. In 2019, she dated Skepta.

In May 2021, she announced the birth of her daughter. In February 2022, Campbell confirmed to Vogue that her daughter was not adopted, posing with her child for a photoshoot. In June 2023, she announced the birth of her son. Campbell shared that her daughter and son were both delivered via surrogate.

=== Association with Jeffrey Epstein ===
Campbell appears in the alleged contact book and in flight logs of late American financier and sex trafficker Jeffrey Epstein, as well as in photographs with Epstein and his associate Ghislaine Maxwell. In August 2019, Campbell addressed the relationship on her YouTube channel, admitting she knew Epstein after being introduced to him by ex-boyfriend Flavio Briatore, stating: "What he's done is indefensible, when I heard what he had done, it sickened me to my stomach, just like everybody else, because I've had my fair share of sexual predators and thank God I had good people around who protected me from this. I stand with the victims. They're scarred for life. For life." However, Campbell's claims are disputed by Epstein victim Virginia Roberts Giuffre, claiming Campbell was aware and a close friend of Maxwell.

In 2022, The Guardian reported on an alleged email exchange from May 2010 between Campbell and Saif al-Islam Gaddafi, in which Campbell described Maxwell as a "great friend" and inquired about arranging a visit to Libya for Maxwell. Campbell's spokesperson responded stating that she did not recognise the alleged email exchange and could not comment on its authenticity, as The Guardian refused to provide her with a copy or evidence of the exchange.

In August 2025, the Department of Justice released a transcript of an interview between Maxwell and Deputy Attorney General Todd Blanche. During the interview, Maxwell admitted that Campbell probably had visited Little Saint James at some point, and that Campbell had a friendship with Epstein that was "independent" of her.

=== Campbell v Mirror Group Newspapers Ltd ===
In 2002, Campbell won a breach of confidentiality lawsuit against the Daily Mirror, after the newspaper published a photograph of her leaving a Narcotics Anonymous meeting. The High Court ordered £3,500 in damages from the Daily Mirror.

=== Testimony for blood diamond case ===
In August 2010 Campbell made an appearance at a trial against former Liberian president Charles Taylor, where she was called to give evidence on possible blood diamonds she received, believed to be from Taylor, in Cape Town, South Africa in 1997. Campbell testified that the diamonds were given to her as a gift by unknown men that she assumed were sent by Taylor. She later gave the diamonds to Jeremy Ractliffe, the then director of the Nelson Mandela Children's Fund, as a donation to charity. Suspecting they were illegal, Ractliffe did not donate them and kept them in his possession. In August 2010, shortly after Campbell's testimony, Ractliffe handed them over to the police.

== Filmography ==
=== Film ===
Year	Title	Role	Notes
1991	Cool as Ice	Singer at First Club	
1993	The Night We Never Met	French Cheese Shopper	
1994	Prêt-à-Porter	Herself	
1995	Miami Rhapsody	Kaia	
1995	To Wong Foo, Thanks for Everything! Julie Newmar	Girl at China Bowl	
1996	Girl 6	Girl #75	
1996	Invasion of Privacy	Cindy Carmichael	
1997	An Alan Smithee Film: Burn Hollywood Burn	Attendant #2	
1999	Trippin'	Naomi Shaffer	
1999	Prisoner of Love	Tracy	
2002	Ali G Indahouse	Herself	
2004	Fat Slags	Sales Assistant	
2006	The Call	Dark Angel – The Evil	Short
2009	Karma Aur Holi	Jennifer	
2010	Por el camino	Herself	
2016	Zoolander 2	Herself	
2018	I Feel Pretty	Helen	
2020	Black Is King	Herself	
2025	Something Beautiful	Herself	Featured on the song "Every Girl You've Ever Loved"
2026	The Devil Wears Prada 2	Herself	

=== Television ===
Year	Title	Role	Notes
1978	The Chiffy Kids	Snow White	Recurring Cast: Season 2
1979	Kids	April	Recurring Cast
1982	Grange Hill	Girl	Episode: "Zoo"
1988	The Cosby Show	Julia	Recurring Cast: Season 5
1990	The Fresh Prince of Bel-Air	Helen	Episode: "Kiss My Butler"
1993	Eurotrash	Herself	Episode: "Episode #1.6"
1994	Network First	Herself	Episode: "Supermodels"
1994	Hi Octane	Herself	Episode: "Pilot"
1994	Top of the Pops	Herself	Episode: "Episode #31.39"
1994	The Clothes Show	Herself	Episode: "Catwalk Special"
1994	Harry Enfield and Chums	Herself	Episode: "Episode #1.1"
1995	Absolutely Fabulous	Herself	Episode: "Jealous"
1995	Saturday Night Live	Herself	Episode: "David Duchovny/Rod Stewart"
1995	New York Undercover	Simone	Recurring Cast: Season 2
1996	E! True Hollywood Story	Herself	Episode: "Naomi Campbell"
1998	For Your Love	Herself	Episode: "The Games People Play"
1999	SexOrama	Herself	Episode: "Stjernernes sexliv"
2001	Miss Universe 2001	Herself/Host	Main Host
2001	Intimate Portrait	Herself	Episode: "Naomi Campbell"
2003	Fastlane	Lena Savage	Episode: "Asslane"
2005	Fashion in Focus	Herself	Episode: "Big Money Under the Tents"
2005	The Fabulous Life of...	Herself	Episode: "Today's Hottest Supermodels"
2005	The Cut	Herself	Episode: "The Newest Designer for Tommy Hilfiger Is..."
2007	Ballando con le Stelle	Herself	Episode: "Episode #4.1"
2008	Ugly Betty	Herself	Episode: "Jump"
2010	The Jacksons: A Family Dynasty	Herself	Episode: "Come Together"
2010	Double Exposure	Herself	Episode: "No One Can Work Like This"
2010	The Rachel Zoe Project	Herself	Episode: "Hustling for Haiti"
2012	Fashion Police	Herself	Episode: "New York Fashion Week"
2013	The Face UK	Herself/Host	Main Host
2013–14	The Face USA	Herself/Host	Main Host
2014	The Face Australia	Herself/Host	Main Host
2014	The Tanning of America	Herself	Recurring Guest
2014	Gogglebox	Herself	Episode: "Celebrity Special SU2C"
2014–15	Ladies of London	Herself	Episode: "Episode #1.2" & "#2.8"
2015	American Horror Story: Hotel	Claudia Bankson	Recurring Cast: Season 5
2016	Black Is the New Black	Herself	Main Guest
2015–16	Empire	Camilla Marks	Recurring Cast: Season 1–2
2017–18	Star	Rose Crane	Recurring Cast: Season 1–2
2018	The '80s Greatest	Herself	Episode: "Miracle on Ice" & "I Want It All"
2019	The CBeebies House Show	Herself	Episode: "The Concert Episode"
2020	Making the Cut	Herself/Judge	Main Judge: Season 1
2020	No Filter with Naomi	Herself/Host	Main Host
2021	Architectural Digest	Herself	Episode: "Inside Naomi Campbell's Luxury Villa In Kenya"
2022	RuPaul's Drag Race: UK vs. the World	Herself	Series 1 Episode: "Grand Finale"
2022	RuPaul's Drag Race All Stars	Herself	Season 7 Episode: "Legends"
2022	The Real Housewives of Dubai	Herself (voice)	Episode: "Reunion Part 1"
2023	The Super Models	Herself	Episode: "The Look"

=== Music videos ===
Year	Title	Artist
1978	"Is This Love"	Bob Marley and the Wailers
1983	"I'll Tumble 4 Ya"	Culture Club
1984	"Mistake No. 3"	Culture Club
1990	"Freedom! '90"	George Michael
1991	"Everyday People"	Aretha Franklin
1992	"In the Closet"	Michael Jackson
1992	"Erotica"	Madonna
1993	"Numb"	U2
1998	"Wise Guy"	Joe Pesci
2001	"Sexual Revolution"	Macy Gray
2003	"Change Clothes"	Jay-Z (feat. Pharrell)
2004	"Da Ya Think I'm Sexy?"	Girls of FHM
2005	"Nasty Girl"	The Notorious B.I.G. (feat. Jagged Edge, P.Diddy, Avery Storm and Nelly)
2011	"Girl Panic!"	Duran Duran
2016	"Drone Bomb Me"	Anohni
2019	"Brown Skin Girl"	Beyoncé
2025	"Every Girl You've Ever Loved"	Miley Cyrus

=== Documentaries ===
Year	Title
1991	Models: The Film
1992	Top Models: Once Upon a Time
1992	Sex
1993	U2: Love Is Blindness
1995	Unzipped
1995	Catwalk
1998	Beautopia
2002	Monstrous Bosses and How to Be One
2010	Rose, c'est Paris
2012	Herb Ritts 'LA Style'
2013	Bettie Page Reveals All
2014	Pop Models
2014	Annabel's: A String of Naked Lightbulbs
2015	Harry's Bar
2016	Franca: Chaos and Creation
2016	Coked Up!
2017	House of Z
2017	Kevyn Aucoin: Beauty & the Beast in Me
2017	Manolo: The Boy Who Made Shoes for Lizards
2017	George Michael: Freedom
2017	Larger Than Life: The Kevyn Aucoin Story
2018	Martin Luther King by Trevor McDonald
2018	The Dream Still Lives
2018	Always at The Carlyle
2019	Peter Lindbergh - Women's Stories
2019	House of Cardin
2019	Very Ralph
2022	The Genius of Gianni Versace Alive
2022	George Michael Freedom Uncut
2023	Invisible Beauty

== Discography ==
=== Albums ===
- 1994: Babywoman (Epic, UK, did not chart)

=== Singles ===
- 1991: "Cool as Ice (Everybody Get Loose)" (Vanilla Ice featuring Naomi Campbell)
- 1994: "Love and Tears"
- 1994: "I Want to Live"
- 1996: "La La La Love Song" (Toshinobu Kubota featuring Naomi Campbell)

=== Guest appearances ===
- 2025: "Every Girl You've Ever Loved" (Miley Cyrus featuring Naomi Campbell)
- 2025: "Ms60" (Amaarae featuring Naomi Campbell)

== Bibliography ==
- 1994: Swan
- 1994: Top Model
- 1996: Naomi
- 2016: Naomi Campbell

== Fragrances ==
Since 1999, Campbell has released 28 fragrances for women via her eponymous perfume house, under the Procter & Gamble brand.

Cat Deluxe line

- Cat Deluxe (2006)
- Cat Deluxe At Night (2007)
- Cat Deluxe With Kisses (2009)
- Cat Deluxe Silver (2019)

Naomi Campbell line

- Naomi Campbell (1999)
- Naomi Campbell Shine & Glimmer (2001)
- Naomi Campbell Light Edition (2003)
- Naomi Campbell Winter Kiss (2006)
- Naomi Campbell Eternal Beauty (2007)
- Naomi Campbell Wild Pearl (2011)
- Naomi Campbell At Night (2012)
- Naomi Campbell Queen of Gold (2013)
- Naomi Campbell Private (2015)
- Naomi Campbell Bohemian Garden (2016)
- Naomi Campbell Glam Rouge (2018)

Prêt à Porter line

- Prêt à Porter (2016)
- Prêt à Porter Silk Collection (2017)
- Prêt à Porter Absolute Velvet (2018)

Miscellaneous fragrances

- Naomagic (2000)
- Exult (2001)
- Mystery (2003)
- Sunset (2004)
- Paradise Passion (2005)
- Seductive Elixir (2008)
- Naomi (2010)
- Here To Stay (2020)
- Here To Shine (2021)

== See also ==
- The Supermodel Trinity
