= Brodbeck & de Barbuat =

French artist duo (born 1986 & 1981, respectively)

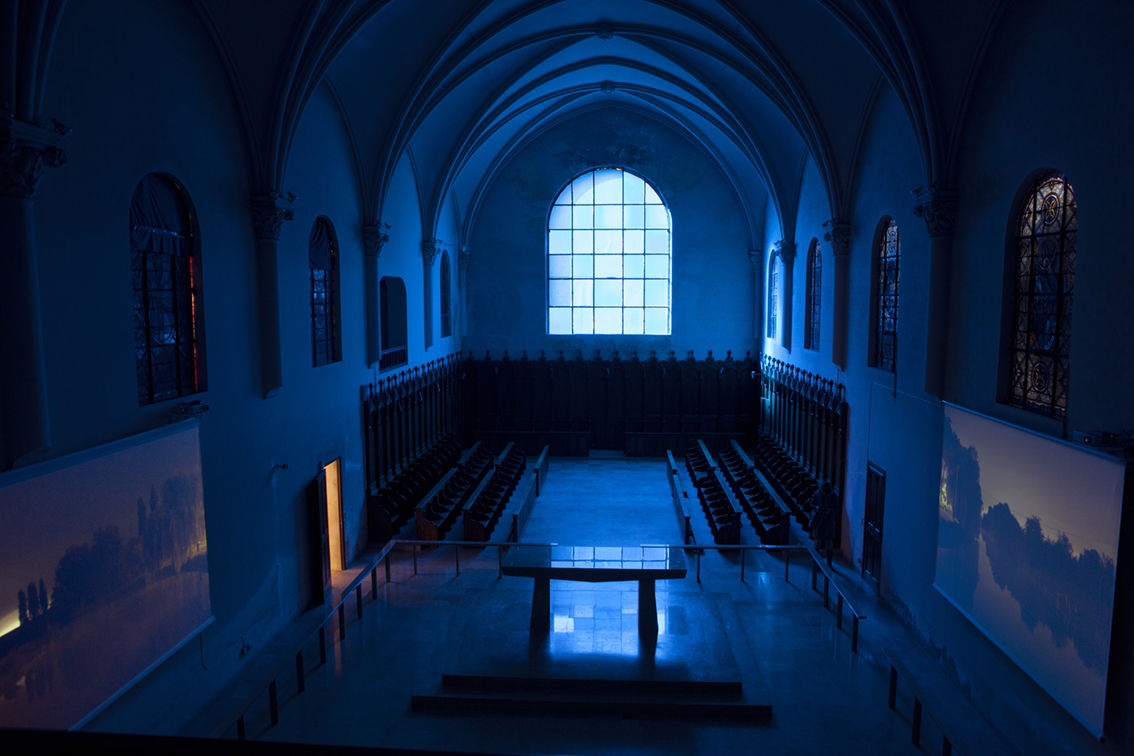
- Born: Lucie de Barbuat and Simon Brodbeck
- Education: Ecole nationale supérieure de la Photographie, France
- Known for: Photography, Video art
- Awards: Villa Medici Fellowship, HSBC award for Photography, Grand prix international de la Photographie de Vevey
- Website: BrodbeckDebarbuat.com

Brodbeck & de Barbuat (born 1986 and 1981) form a couple of visual artists working with photography, video and installation.

== Biography ==
Brodbeck & de Barbuat (also known as Lucie & Simon) were born in France. They have worked together since 2005 in Paris. They are graduates from the Ecole nationale supérieure de la Photographie in France, and fellow artists from the Villa Medici, French Academy in Rome, Italy.

Their work questions through large-scale photographs and video installations our relationship to the physical and spiritual world and the perception of reality and its representation in visual arts. From urban or family solitude to existential wanderings, their compositions capture different moods of man's silent melancholy, focusing on the narrow chink between our existence and the world of dreams. Through photography, video and installation, their projects explore the boundaries between media as forms of expression and the identity of the image as document.

== Exhibitions ==
Their works have been exhibited in solo shows including the FoMu, Museum of Photography Antwerp, Belgium, the Institut français du Japon in Osaka, Japan, the Maison de la Photographie, Lille, France, the Chimney New-York, and group shows including the Grand Palais in Paris, the Kunsthalle Munich, the Venice Arsenale, the Thessaloniki Museum for Photography in Greece, Bibliothèque nationale de France, Le Centquatre in Paris, la Vieille charité in Marseille, 798 District, Beijing, at the festival des arts visuels de Vevey, Switzerland, and the Kowall+Oddermat projects space in Miami.

== Influences ==
Their work is influenced by the Romantic era with French and German painters such as Théodore Géricault, Antoine-Jean Gros, Jacques-Louis David, Paul Delaroche, Caspar David Friedrich, Karl Friedrich Schinkel, German Expressionism (Fritz Lang...) and Land art through the work of American artists such as Michael Heizer, Walter De Maria or James Turrell.

Simon Brodbeck is also the son of German photographer Peter Lindbergh.

== Works ==
=== In search of Eternity (2012-2016) ===
In search of Eternity (2012–2016) is a large body of work made of videos and photographs inspired by an ancient Sioux belief that the spirits of the dead continue to live among Humans, between the Earth and the sky. In the project, the camera plays the role of a spirit who would roam among landscapes and people in a time and space different from the one we know. Exploring the boundaries between still and moving images.

The project is divided in three chapters. First part (2012–2013) was shot in Paris, France and travels through the last popular parts of the city. In search of Eternity II (2014–2015) takes place in Japan and puts into light a symbolic story reflecting the birth of life on Earth. The audio atmosphere was created in homage to the 1987 film Der Himmel über Berlin by Wim Wenders, and includes a poem by German author Peter Handke. The last chapter of the project (2015–2016) takes place in India in the region of Maharashtra. The project puts into light a symbolic story of the quest for self-knowledge and the representation of the mind. The sound of the installation includes the voice of a man reading an excerpt of the 1919 Bildungsroman Demian by German author Hermann Hesse. Evoking the link between Man and nature and the quest for self-knowledge, the voice is accompanied by a musical theme recalling the 1972 movie by Werner Herzog : Aguirre, the wrath of God.

=== Silent world (2008-2013) ===
Shot from 2008 to 2013, this series of large-scale photographs finds its origins in the early years of Photography, when Boulevard du temple, Louis Daguerre's 1838 photograph showed an apparently empty street where just a shoe-shine was visible. The length of exposure, several hours long, questions the identity of the images by showing a world in which time and space would have been altered and cannot be recognized.

=== Living images (2009-2010) ===
The video project approaches our life cycle within women portraits filmed at different stages of their existence. On each image, people are invited to pose still for an hour. The scene goes round in cycle in an infinite movement. The people's silent gestures and impassive looks distance the scene from its viewers to give a feeling of being just a vague memory, producing an interiorized narrative and imbiguous melancholy thought. Art historian Julie Enckell-Julliard stated «halfway between video and photography, Living images addresses the ineffable boundary between dreams and reality, that invisible thread linking us to the intangible sphere of the world of the dead. With a slowness of movement resembling the last sigh of life, figures appear suspended in eternity.»

=== Vertiges quotidien (2006-2009) ===
In Vertiges quotidien (2006–2009) the point of view from the sky or the ceiling, transforms the representation of the image into a pictorial composition. Art critic Philippe Dagen in a 2009 article in Le Monde stated "our horizontal world photographed from above tumbles to vertical. The living become lying, beds become drawings, spaces are transformed in plans, and life a mysterious geometry." Recreating the visual universe and proportions and erasing notions of perspective and depth of field so particular to photography, the project's point of view, like a spirit looking at humanity, transforms volumes into surfaces and blurs our usual references of reading an image.

=== Earth vision (2004-2008) ===
Shot from 2004 to 2008 Earth vision reveals landscapes hidden in the dark. At night, the photographic camera reveals landscapes nonexistent to the naked eye. The extended and uncut recording time process necessary lets the fogged colors of night appear on the image, and thus discovers hidden, imaginary worlds at the fringe of our cities. Mental spaces take form, reminding of the Myth of the Atlantis.

== Awards ==
- 2016: Villa Medici, Academie de France in Rome
- 2013: Prix Jeune Création - Institut français du Japon
- 2010: Prix HSBC pour la Photographie
- 2009: Nestlé prize, Grand prix international de la Photographie, Vevey, Switzerland
- 2009: Bourse du Talent, Bibliothèque nationale de France
- 2009: Marcel Bleustein-Blanchet Foundation award

== Public collections ==
- Bibliothèque nationale de France
- Fotomuseum Antwerpen, Belgium
- Thessaloniki museum of Photography, Greece
- Musée Jenisch, Vevey, Switzerland
- Pavillon Populaire, Montpellier, France
- Centre interrégional de conservation et restauration du patrimoine, France

== Monographs ==
- La Fabrique des rêves, Opéra national de Paris editions, 2015 (essay by Stéphane Lissner)
- Vertiges du quotidien, Actes sud editions, 2010 (essays by Klaus Honnef and Bernard Marcelis)
