= Camilo José Vergara =

Chilean photographer (born 1944)

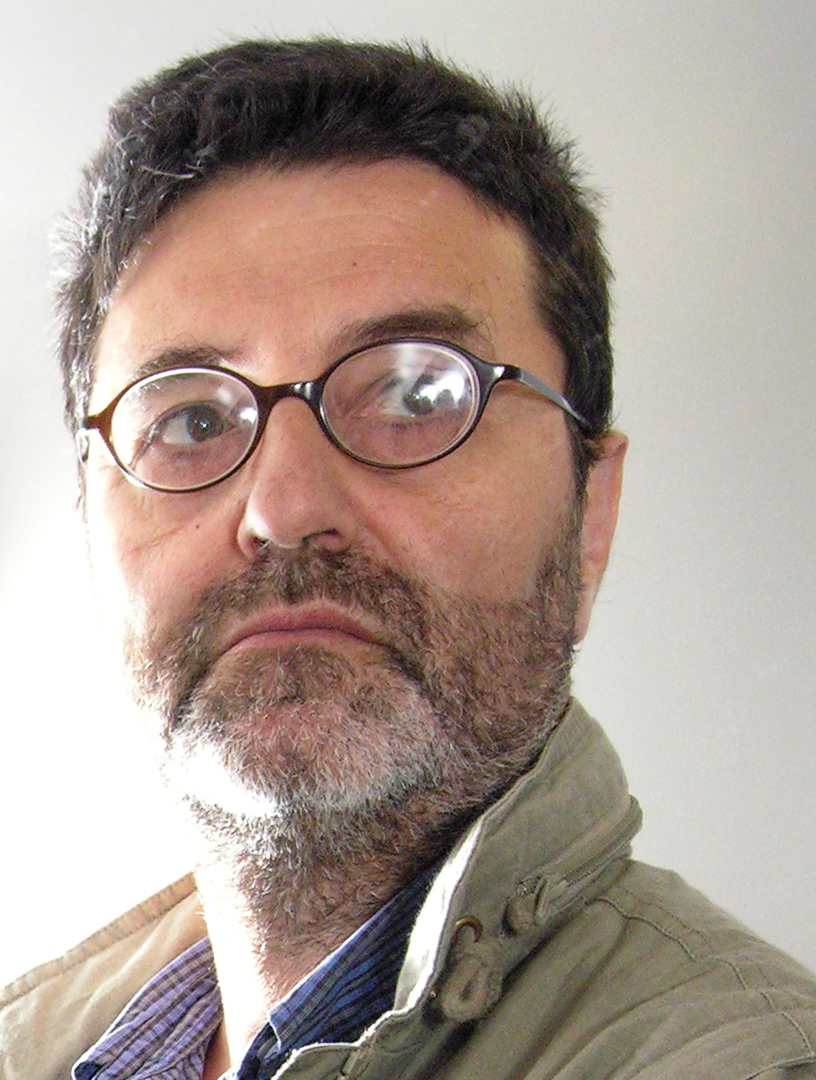
- Vergara in 2005
- Born: 1944 (age 81–82) Santiago, Chile
- Occupation: Photographer
- Education: University of Notre Dame (BA); Columbia University (MA)
- Literary movement: Counterurbanization
- Notable awards: 2002 MacArthur Fellowship; 2010 Berlin Prize fellowship; 2013 National Humanities Medal

Camilo José Vergara (born 1944 in Santiago, Chile) is a Chilean-born, New York-based writer, photographer, and documentarian.

Vergara has been compared to Jacob Riis for his photographic documentation of American slums and decaying urban environments. Beginning in the 1980s, Vergara applied the technique of rephotography to a series of American cities, photographing the same buildings and neighborhoods from the exact vantage point at regular intervals over many years to capture changes over time. Trained as a sociologist with a specialty in urbanism, Vergara turned to his systematic documentation at a moment of urban decay, and he chose locales where that stress seemed highest: the housing projects of Chicago; the South Bronx of New York City; Camden, New Jersey; and Detroit, Michigan, among others.

== Education ==
Vergara received a B.A. (1968) in sociology from the University of Notre Dame and an M.A. (1977) in sociology from Columbia University, where he also completed the course work for his Ph.D. (not yet awarded).

== Career ==
Vergara began as a humanistic New York street photographer in the early '70s, when he moved to the city. This work changed significantly in the middle 1970s, when graduate work in sociology at Columbia University increasingly sensitized him to the complexities of environmental influences on social behavior. The advent of Kodachrome 64 film in 1974 alerted Vergara to the possibilities of permanent color photographic records of changing urban landscapes and their features. He began at that time to work systematically, using techniques adapted from sociological methodologies; traveling from one subway stop to the next, he would emerge onto the street and then photograph the surrounding blocks, fanning steadily outward. By 1977, he had come upon a rough approximation of his lifelong working method, returning to the same locales over time to photograph changes in the makeup of the communities in question.

With more than a decade of photographs to document the extraordinary phenomenon of de-urbanization (including the conversion of buildings from one function to a second, then a third, before their abandonment, and the process by which nature recolonized long-urban areas), Vergara published The New American Ghetto with Rutgers University Press, for which he received the Robert E. Park Award of the American Sociological Association in 1997.

Sequence of 4 photographs taken by Camilo José Vergara of Fern Street in N. Camden, NJ from 1979 to 2004. Demonstrates Vergara's use of time lapse in recording a site over time. Clockwise from top left 1979, 1988, 1997, 2004.

The rephotographic method, with its rigorous demands for systematic return, exact replication of vantage point, angle of view, and lens choice, had emerged originally out of the need for scientific evidence of change over time in ecological niches. Vergara's use of the technique was not exclusive; indeed, Vergara made other pictures, including of residents and smaller details. Beginning with The New American Ghetto, Vergara increasingly interwove these photographs, along with quotes from outside writers, fragments of comments by citizen-dwellers in the cityscapes he developed, and his own writing. Vergara's work was the subject of a 1999 exhibit at the National Building Museum, "El Nuevo Mundo: The Landscape of Latino Los Angeles". The exhibit was shown later in 1999 at the Cooper-Hewitt, National Design Museum, Smithsonian Institution. "The New American Ghetto", an earlier exhibition, opened at the National Building Museum and was later shown at The Municipal Arts Society in New York City. After the publication of his second major work, American Ruins, Vergara's reputation was fully established; he won a MacArthur Foundation "genius grant" in 2002 and served as a fellow at the Mid-Atlantic Regional Center for the Humanities (MARCH) at Rutgers University in 2003–2004.

The advent of sophisticated internet combinations of mapping, visual archiving, and hyperlinking have enabled Vergara to present his work in ways that can combine both the vertical (change over time) and the horizontal (change across space) and link the visual images to texts and databases. Since 2004, Vergara's main work has been conveyed in a website called "Invincible Cities". Upon the news that Google Earth would allow users to compare historical street scenes, Quartz likened the development to Vergara's website and oeuvre.

His projects include a continuing series of exhibitions, books, and magazine projects, including a collection of pictures of Chicago's public housing for the new literary magazine Granta. Slate and Time magazines have also commissioned him to produce "mines" of his work—collections that feature topics or themes, from GM automobiles to distant traces of the World Trade Towers. His eight and most recent book is Harlem: The Unmaking of a Ghetto, published in December 2013 by the University of Chicago Press. The book combines Vergara's early humanistic photographs with his long-running rephotography series of the iconic Manhattan community.

In early 2020, Vergara began a long-term project photographing the experience of the COVID-19 pandemic in the United States. Early images started on the country's West Coast in the Bay Area but quickly shifted to New York City and nearby New Jersey, throughout the most intense phase of the pandemic in the New York City metropolitan region. Many of the photographs are archived in the Library of Congress, and others have been presented by the National Building Museum. The photographs continue Vergara's attention to U.S. racial and economic disparities by visualizing how the pandemic is differentially experienced, with special attention to personal and built environmental adaptations to the pandemic.

== Contribution to discussion of ruins and photography ==
In 1995, Vergara made a controversial proposal that 12 square blocks of downtown Detroit be declared a "skyscraper ruins park", an "American acropolis", for the preservation and study of the deteriorating and empty skyscrapers:

We could transform the nearly 100 troubled buildings into a grand national historic park of play and wonder, an urban Monument Valley. ... Midwestern prairie would be allowed to invade from the north. Trees, vines, and wildflowers would grow on roofs and out of windows; goats and wild animals—squirrels, possum, bats, owls, ravens, snakes and insects—would live in the empty behemoths, adding their calls, hoots and screeches to the smell of rotten leaves and animal droppings.

The proposal launched a public conversation about representations of the city's built environment and is considered an important statement in the debates surrounding deindustrialization and ruins photography.

== Awards ==
In 2010, Vergara was rewarded a Berlin Prize fellowship and spent the academic spring semester 2010 at the American Academy in Berlin.

On July 10, 2013, Vergara received the National Humanities Medal from President Barack Obama in a ceremony at the White House.

On Friday, May 18, 2018, Vergara was awarded an honorary degree from The New School.

== Bibliography ==
=== Books ===
- Vergara, Camilo José (1989). Silent cities : the evolution of the American cemetery.
- 1995, New American Ghetto. ISBN 0-8135-2209-9
- 1999, American Ruins. ISBN 1-58093-056-5
- 2001, Twin Towers Remembered. ISBN 1-56898-351-4
- 2001, Unexpected Chicagoland. ISBN 1-56584-701-6
- 2004, Subway Memories. ISBN 1-58093-146-4
- 2005, How the Other Half Worships. ISBN 0-8135-3682-0
- 2013, Harlem: The Unmaking of a Ghetto. ISBN 978-0226853369
- 2016, Detroit Is No Dry Bones. ISBN 978-0472130115

=== Essays and reporting ===
- Vergara, Camilo José (Autumn 2009). "The Projects". Granta (108): 153–160.
- — (Autumn 2009). "Chicago 1981-2009 : photographs". Granta (108): 161–191.
- Vergara, Camilo José. (March 3, 2014) "Harlem Time Tracker." MAS Context.
