= White Ribbon Alliance =

International non-profit organization

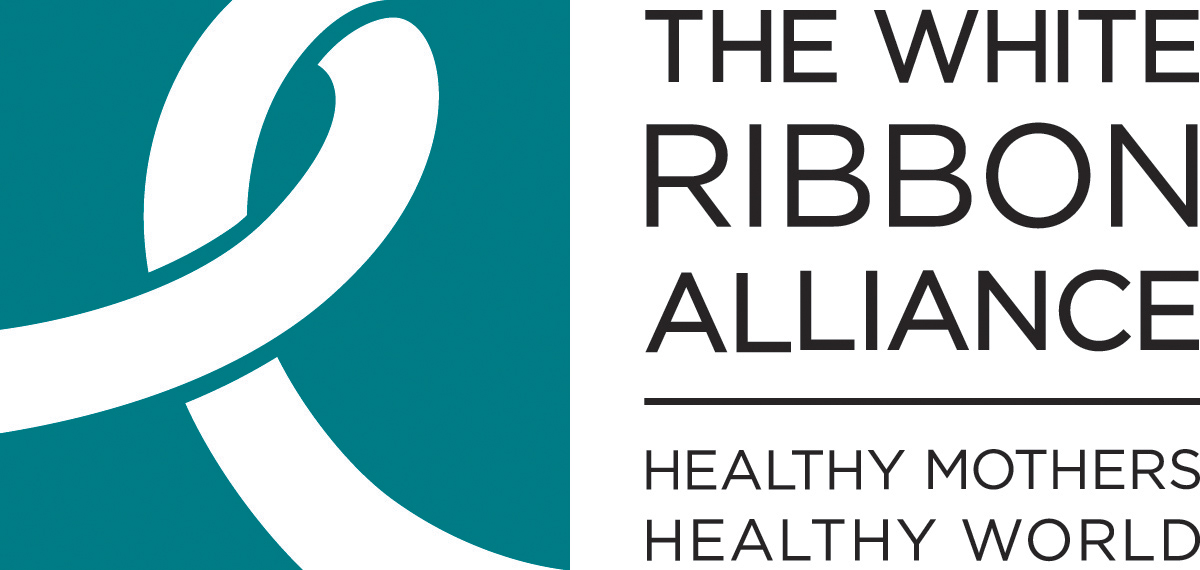
- Formation: 1999; 27 years ago
- Type: International coalition
- Chief Executive Officer: Kristy Kade
- Website: whiteribbonalliance.org

The White Ribbon Alliance (WRA) is an international non-profit organization that advocates for maternal health. The alliance focuses on ending maternal mortality and improving the health of mothers and newborns. The nonpartisan, non-governmental membership organization was initially established in 1999 as the White Ribbon Alliance for Safe Motherhood. It operates as an alliance convening many global, national and sub-national partners.

The White Ribbon Alliance organises stakeholders' meetings through its National Alliances. It supports reproductive health and reproductive rights.

The White Ribbon Alliance was formed in 1999 as an informal coalition of non-governmental organizations. It is registered as a 501(c)(3) organization in the United States. The organization maintains an extensive network of Alliances and members around the world, including 14 National Alliances in Bangladesh, India, Indonesia, Kenya, Malawi, Mexico, Nepal, Nigeria, Pakistan, Uganda, United Kingdom, and Zimbabwe.

In 2011, the White Ribbon Alliance led an effort to create a charter for Respectful Maternity Care that detailed the rights of women who seek maternity care. White Ribbon Alliance India established National Safe Motherhood Day in 2003. The annual observance on 11 April coincides with the birthday of Kasturba Gandhi. As part of its campaign against gender-based violence, the Alliance established the Flint Festival of Rights in 2023. The event included the exhibition of the Red Dress collaborative embroidery project.

The White Ribbon Alliance has received support from the MacArthur Foundation, the Bill & Melinda Gates Foundation, and Amref Health Africa.
