= Too Much Humbug =

Studio album by Warumpi Band
- Released: 1996
- Genre: Aboriginal rock
- Label: CAAMA Music
- Producer: Mark Ovenden

Warumpi Band chronology
Go Bush! (1987)	Too Much Humbug (1996)	Warumpi Band 4 Ever (2015)

Singles from Too Much Humbug
- 1. "Stompin' Ground" Released: late 1996

Too Much Humbug is the third and final studio album by Australian band, Warumpi Band. It was released in 1996. At the ARIA Music Awards of 1996, the album was nominated for Best Indigenous Release.

== Background and release ==
Too Much Humbug was something of a "comeback album", released when the band regrouped in the wake of Christine Anu's success with their song "My Island Home" in 1995. The album was produced by Mark Ovenden and includes a re-recording of "Blackfella/Whitefella" as well as "Stompin' Ground" which was nominated for Best Indigenous Release at the ARIA Music Awards of 1997. Musically the album mixes hard rock with the band's earlier roots, reggae and country influences.

== Track listing ==
Too Much Humbug
No.	Title	Writer(s)	Length
1.	"Wayathul"	George Djilaynga, Neil Murray,	6:43
2.	"Stompin' Ground"	Sammy Butcher, Djilaynga, Murray	3:33
3.	"Makes You Feel"	Butcher, Djilaynga, Bill Heckenberg, Bill Jacobi Murray	5:46
4.	"Never Change"	Butcher, Murray	4:27
5.	"Djulpan (Seven Sisters Stars)"	Datjing, Djilaynga, Gumbula	3:25
6.	"Stars"	Butcher, Murray	4:03
7.	"Cold Weather"	Butcher, Murray	4:43
8.	"Marrayilyil"		3:54
9.	"Joining My Life"		5:26
10.	"Koori Man"		4:56
11.	"Holdin' You in My Arms"		4:14
12.	"We Shall Cry"		4:13
13.	"Blackfella/Whitefella" (re-recorded)	George Djilaynga, Murray	4:20

== Release history ==
Country	Date	Format	Label	Catalogue
Australia	April 1996	CD, CS	CAAMA Music	CAAMA 259
Australia	2013	CD	Festival Records	Fest601010
