= Big Name, No Blankets =

Studio album by Warumpi Band
- Released: 1985
- Recorded: 1984−1985
- Studio: Trafalgar Studios, Sydney, Centre Trax Studios, Koalaroo Studios
- Genre: Post-punk; pop rock; Aboriginal rock; country rock; punk blues
- Label: Powderworks Records
- Producer: The Warumpi Band

Warumpi Band chronology
| Big Name, No Blankets (1985) | Go Bush! (1987) |

Singles from Big Name, No Blankets
- 1. "Breadline" Released: April 1985; 2. "Blackfella/Whitefella" Released: October 1985

Big Name, No Blankets is the debut studio album by Australian band, Warumpi Band. It was released in 1985.

In 2011, Neil Murray explained the title of the album saying they were playing in Halls Creek in 1984 and their single "Jailangaru Parkanu (Out from Jail)" had played on Countdown. Locals saw it and said "You must be rich you blokes" to which lead singer, Kumunjay said, "no we only got big name, no blankets".

The cover art was of the band in 1982 touring through the Tanami Desert.

== Reception ==
In a retrospective review in 2007, Double J said "their debut captures a rollicking desert rock band in electrifying form. Its raw energy ensured it stood out sonically from much else on offer in the early-80s. The fact that it featured songs sung in English, Luritja and Gumatj, telling stories of contemporary Aboriginal issues, makes it a significant document."

== Track listing ==
Big Name, No Blankets
| No. | Title | Writer(s) | Length |
|---|---|---|---|
| 1. | "Waru (Fire)" | Neil Murray, George Rurrambu | 3:53 |
| 2. | "Blackfella/Whitefella" | Murray, Rurrambu | 3:30 |
| 3. | "Breadline" | Murray | 4:19 |
| 4. | "Nyuntu Nyaaltjirriku (What Are You Going to Do?)" | Sammy Butcher, Edgar Ellis, Murray, Rurrambu | 4:14 |
| 5. | "Animal Song" | Murray | 3:10 |
| 6. | "Warumpinya (Papunya)" | Butcher | 3:14 |
| 7. | "Wiima Tjuta (All the Kids)" | Rurrambu | 2:17 |
| 8. | "Fitzroy Crossing" | Murray | 4:01 |
| 9. | "Mulga & Spinifex Plain" | Murray | 5:49 |
| 10. | "Gotta Be Strong" | Butcher, Murray, Rurrambu | 3:11 |

== Release history ==
| Country | Date | Format | Label | Catalogue |
|---|---|---|---|---|
| Australia | 1985 | LP, CS | Powderworks Records | POW 6098 |
| Australia | 1988 (Note: Included their 1986 single Sit Down Money.) | LP, CS, CD | Parole Records, Festival Records | C 38935 D 38935 L 38935 |
| Australia | August 2007 | CD | Warner Music Australia | D 38935 |
