= Australian Aboriginal English =

Dialect of English used by Aboriginal Australians

- Native to: Australia
- Region: Oceania
- Language family: Indo-European: Germanic; West Germanic; North Sea Germanic; Anglo-Frisian; Anglic; English; Australian English; Australian Aboriginal English
- Early forms: Proto-Indo-European: Proto-Germanic; Proto-West Germanic; Proto-English; Old English; Middle English; Early Modern English; 18th century British English & Hiberno-English
- Writing system: Latin (English alphabet)

Language codes
- ISO 639-3: –
- Glottolog: abor1240 code abandoned, but bibliography retained
- AIATSIS: P4

Australian Aboriginal English (AAE or AbE) is a set of dialects of the English language used by a large section of the Aboriginal Australian population as a result of the British colonisation of Australia. It is made up of a number of varieties which developed differently in different parts of Australia, and grammar and pronunciation differs from that of standard Australian English, along a continuum. Some of its words have also been adopted into standard or colloquial Australian English.

== General description ==
There are generally distinctive features of phonology, grammar, words and meanings, as well as language use in Australian Aboriginal English, compared with Australian English. The language is also often accompanied by a lot of non-verbal cues.

Negative attitudes that exist in Australian society towards AAE have negative effects on Aboriginal people across law, health and educational contexts. Speakers have been noted to tend to change between different forms of AAE depending on whom they are speaking to, e.g. striving to speak more like Australian English when speaking to a non-Aboriginal English-speaking person. This is sometimes referred to as diglossia or codeswitching and is common among Aboriginal people living in major cities.

AAE terms, or derivative terms, are sometimes used by the broader Australian community. Australian Aboriginal English is spoken among Aboriginal people generally, but is especially evident in what are called "discrete communities", i.e. ex-government or mission reserves such as the DOGIT communities in Queensland.

== Varieties ==
There exists a continuum of varieties of Aboriginal English, ranging from light forms, close to standard Australian English, to heavy forms, closer to Kriol. The varieties developed differently in different parts of Australia, by Aboriginal peoples of many language groups. Kriol is a totally separate language from English, spoken by over 30,000 people in Australia.

Specific features of Aboriginal English differ between regions. In Nyungar country in Perth, Western Australia, they include address terms and kinship, uninverted questions (That's your Auntie?), the utterance tag unna, and Nyungar terms such as boya, boodjar, maya-maya, and moorditji, among other features. Specific terms can be used to refer to local or regional varieties of AbE, for example Koori or Murri English, Broome lingo and Noongar English.

Nunga English is the southern South Australian dialect of Aboriginal English. It includes words from the Narungga, Ngarrindjeri, and West Coast languages, as well as local variations in pronunciation. According to Uncle Lewis O'Brien, people from the Point Pearce mission on the Yorke Peninsula have a distinct way of pronouncing "r" in words such as "girl" and "bird", somewhat akin to the accent of the Cornish miners who worked in the area in the late 19th and early 20th centuries.

Aboriginal English varieties also occur in Indigenous-authored fictional broadcast media, including kinship words like cousin brother, brother boys, sister girl and daughter girl, and other frequent words such as blackfella(s) and mob.

== Grammar ==
=== Auxiliary verbs ===
Similar to Caribbean and African American Vernacular English, Aboriginal English does not make use of auxiliary verbs, such as to be and to have, or copulas to link things together. For example, the Aboriginal English equivalent of "We are working" is "We workin’".

=== Pronouns ===
In Aboriginal English, particularly in northern Australia, the pronouns he and him may be used for females and inanimate objects in additional to the expected masculine case. This is also shared in standard English with the masculine pronouns possessing a neuter case, uncommonly (often historically) referring to an unspecified sex (e.g. one must brush his teeth). The distinction between he as the nominative form and him as the oblique form is not always observed, and him may be found as the subject of a verb.

== Phonology ==
Sutton (1989) documents that some speakers of Aboriginal English in the area around Adelaide in South Australia have an uncommon degree of rhoticity, relative to both other AAE speakers and Standard Australian English speakers (which are generally non-rhotic). These speakers realise /r/ as [ɹ] in the preconsonantal, postvocalic position (after a vowel and before a consonant), though only within stems. For example: [boːɹd] "board", [t̠ʃɜɹt̠ʃ] "church", [pɜɹθ] "Perth"; but [flæː] "flour", [dɒktə] "doctor". Sutton speculates that this feature may derive from the fact that many of the first settlers in coastal South Australia – including Cornish tin-miners, Scottish missionaries, and American whalers – spoke rhotic varieties. Many of his informants grew up in Point Pearce and Point McLeay.

Most Australian Aboriginal languages have three- or five-vowel systems, and these form the substrate for Aboriginal English vowel pronunciations, especially in more basilectal accents. More basilectal varieties tend to merge a number of vowels, up to the point of merging all Australian English vowels into the three or five vowels of a given speaker's native language. That said, the diphthongs, and especially the face and choice diphthongs, tend to be maintained in all but the heaviest accents, albeit they are frequently shortened.

Although Indigenous language and basilectal Aboriginal English vowel systems are small, there is a high degree of allophony. For example, vowels may be heavily fronted and raised in the presence of palatal consonants.

Many Aboriginal people, including those who speak acrolectal varieties of English and even those who do not speak an Indigenous language, do not nasalize vowels before nasal consonants, unlike other Australian English speakers.

Acrolectal Aboriginal accents tend to have a smaller vowel space compared to Standard Australian English. The Aboriginal English vowel space tends to share the same lower boundary as Indigenous language vowel spaces, but shares an upper boundary with Standard Australian English, thus representing an expansion upwards from the Indigenous vowel space. There are other differences between acrolectal Aboriginal English and Standard Australian English vowel qualities, which tend to represent conservatism on the part of Aboriginal speakers.

== Lexicon ==
=== Balanda ===
Balanda is a word used by the Yolŋu people for European people; originally from the Makassarese language, via Malay orang belanda (Dutch person).

=== Blackfella ===
Aboriginal people (particularly those in the Outback and in the Top End) often refer to themselves and other Aboriginal people as "blackfellas". The Australian Kriol term for an Aboriginal person is "blackbala", which comes from this term. The term is considered racist and highly offensive when used by a non-indigenous person.

=== Business ===
Many Aboriginal people use the word business in a distinct way, to mean "matters". Funeral and mourning practices are commonly known as "sorry business". Financial matters are referred to as "money business", and the secret-sacred rituals distinct to each sex are referred to as "women's business" and "men's business". "Secret women's business" was at the centre of the Hindmarsh Island Bridge controversy.

=== Camp ===
Many Aboriginal people refer to their house as their camp, particularly in Central Australia and the Top End of the Northern Territory.

=== Cheeky ===
"Cheeky" (or "tjiki") may be used to mean "sly, cunning, malicious, malevolent, spiteful, ill-disposed, ill-natured, mischievous, vicious, bad, wicked, [or] evil", so can be used to describe a person, dog, mosquito or snake, and "a cheeky bugger is a universal substitute for just about anything or anybody on earth". It can be used to denote a dangerous or aggressive animal or person, so for instance could be used describe a dog that is likely to bite or attack.

=== Country ===
The word "country" has special meaning for Aboriginal people; it has a "spiritual and philosophical dimension" by which they relate to a certain place. This meaning is now regarded to be part of Australian English, as it has become familiar to non-Indigenous Australians, for example in Welcome to Country ceremonies and the term connection to country, signifying the deep attachment to, and obligation to care for, the traditional lands of their group.

=== Dardy ===
Dardy originates in South-western Western Australia and means "cool", or really good.

=== Deadly ===
Deadly is used by many Aboriginal people to mean excellent, or very good, in the same way that "wicked", "sick" or "awesome" is by many young English speakers. Deadly Awards (aka Deadlys) were awards for outstanding achievement by Aboriginal and Torres Strait Islander people.

This usage is not exclusive to Aboriginal people. It is commonly heard in Ireland.

=== Fella ===
In some forms of Aboriginal English, "fellow" (usually spelt fella, feller, fullah, fulla, etc.) is used in combination with adjectives or numerals, e.g. "big fella business" = "important business", "one-feller girl" = "one girl". This can give it an adverbial meaning, e.g. "sing out big fella" = "call out loudly". It is also used with pronouns to indicate the plural, e.g. "me fella" = "we" or "us", "you fella" = "you all". Other words include blackfella (an Aboriginal person) and whitefella (a white person).

=== Gammon ===
In Victorian era slang used by criminals, "gammon" was to swindle someone or cheat them, used for example in the sense of creating a distraction while pickpocketing; or, more generally, nonsense, "humbug". Its origin has been variously thought to be related to leg of cured ham known as gammon or the game of backgammon.

The word is used across Australian Aboriginal communities, with its meaning given variously as inauthentic, cheap or broken; to be pretending or joking; or just pathetic or lame. Macquarie Dictionary's Australian Word Map ascribes six meanings, based on feedback from around the country, in which the word is used as several different parts of speech, mainly relating to deceit, joking, and false, but also to a lame (pathetic, bad) idea. As a verb ("gammon/gamin/gammin around") means to fool around, and may also be used as an expression equivalent to "As if!". The word is also used by non-Aboriginal people, and it has been noted that the PNG Tok Pisin word for liar is giaman or giamon.

=== Gubbah ===
Gubbah, also spelt gubba, is a term used by some Aboriginal people to refer to white or non-Aboriginal people. The Macquarie Dictionary has it as "n. Colloq. (derog.) an Aboriginal term for a white man". Also, "gubba, n. Colloq. (derog.) 1. a white man. 2. a peeping tom. [Aboriginal: white demon]". A 1972 newspaper article suggested that the word is the "diminutive of garbage". The word "Gubba" is derived from the word "Government" and is representative of the white men who came to take children from the missions, eg in a sentence " run from the Gubbament" nothing to do with white people as a whole, has been bastardised to blanket New South Wales. Most other states don't utilise the word.

While it can be used derogatorily, "Gubba" is also used to refer to friends, e.g. "gubba mates". Other words for white people are balanda (see above), migaloo, and wadjela.

The name of the town of Coober Pedy is thought to derive from the Kokatha-Barngarla term kupa-piti (or guba-bidi), which translates to "whitefellas' hole".

=== Gunyah ===
Used in Nunga English (South Australia) to refer to non-Aboriginal people.

=== Humbug ===
Whereas humbug in broader English (see Charles Dickens's Scrooge character) means nonsensical, or unimportant information, humbug in Aboriginal English means to pester with inane or repetitive requests. The Warumpi Band released an album entitled Too Much Humbug. In the Northern Territory, humbug is used by both black and white in this latter, Aboriginal way. The most commonly recognised definition of humbug refers to an Aboriginal person asking a relative for money. Humbugging can become a serious burden where the traditional culture is one of communal ownership and strong obligations between relatives.

=== Mob ===
Colloquially used to mean a group of Aboriginal people associated with an extended family group, clan group or wider community group, from a particular place or "Country". It is used to connect and identify the person and where they are from. "My mob" means my people, or extended family.

Mob is often used to refer to a language group, as in "that Warlpiri mob".

Mob and mobs are also used to describe a lot of people or things when an actual number is not stated, and is usually associated with "big" or "biggest". Examples include, "There was a big mob (or the biggest mob) at the football." or "There was no moon, so we could see the biggest mobs of stars" or in a health perspective, "I've got a big mob of pain".

You mob can be used instead of you as second person plural pronoun address.

=== Rubbish ===
While "rubbish" as an adjective in many dialects of English means wrong, stupid, or useless, in the north of Australia, "rubbish" is usually used to describe someone who is too old or too young to be active in the local culture. Another use is meaning something is "not dangerous"; for example, non-venomous snakes are all considered to be "rubbish", while in contrast, venomous snakes are "cheeky". In both cases, "rubbish" approximately means "inert".

=== Yarn ===
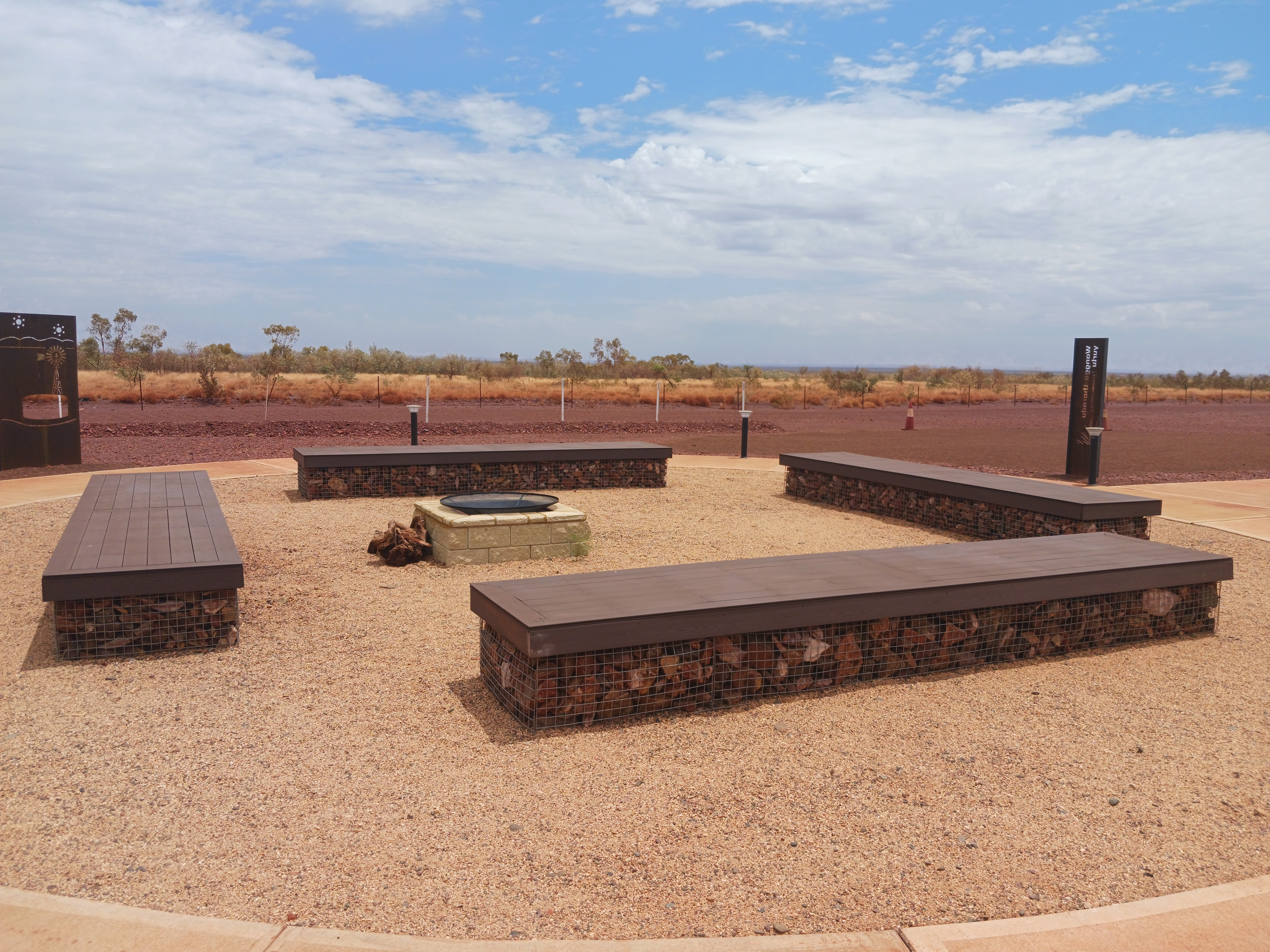
A yarning circle at a mining camp in the Pilbara, Western Australia, on the traditional lands of the Panyjima people

Yarn is an English word for a long story, often with incredible or unbelievable events. Originally a sailors' expression, "to spin a yarn", in reference to stories told while performing mundane tasks such as spinning yarn.

In Aboriginal English, the word is used as a verb (yarning), referring to a "conversational and storytelling style where Indigenous people share stories based on real experience and knowledge, from intimate family gatherings to formal public presentations". A "yarning circle" is a way of passing on cultural knowledge and building respectful relationships within a group. A 2021 article about Indigenous health communication says that yarning "includes repetition as a way to emphasise what is important in the message", and suggests that using the method can be useful in imparting health information. Yarning circles have been introduced in men's and women's prisons across New South Wales, starting with Broken Hill Correctional Centre, in a bid to connect Indigenous inmates with their culture, and reduce reoffending and the high rates of incarceration of Aboriginal and Torres Strait Islander people.

=== Unna ===
Often conjoined with the word "deadly", "unna" means "True" or "ain't it?". It is used primarily by the Nunga (including Ngarrindjeri), Noongar, and Yolngu peoples. This word is used frequently in the 1998 novel Deadly, Unna? by Phillip Gwynne.

=== Whichway and Wotnah ===
These phrases can be used to ask "What's happening?"

=== Whitefella ===
In Aboriginal communities, particularly those in the outback and the Top End, Aboriginal people often refer to white people as "whitefellas". In Australian Kriol, "waitbala" means "a white person" and comes from this word. It and its counterpart "blackfella" headline "Blackfella/Whitefella", an Aboriginal country rock anthem about the need for racial harmony.

=== Other words ===
Some other words with particular meanings in Aboriginal English, or derived from an Aboriginal language, and/or pertaining to Aboriginal culture, include:

- Bunji ('mate, friend or "sister in-law (more common for female speakers)"
- Bush tucker
- Cleverman (Note: See Cleverman, TV series.)
- Featherfoot (moving quickly from one place to another)
- Foot Falcon ('walk')
- Horse ('something awesome')
- Humpy
- Songline
- Tidda ('sister, female friend')
- Tjukurrpa
- Yabber
- Yakka
- Yidaki
- Yowie

== See also ==
- Australian Aboriginal Pidgin English
- List of English words of Australian Aboriginal origin
- Neo-Nyungar
- Torres Strait English
- Torres Strait Creole
- Aboriginal English in Canada
- American Indian English
