= Blackfella =

Term referring to Indigenous Australians

Blackfella (also blackfellah, blackfulla, black fella, or black fellah) is an informal term in Australian English to refer to Indigenous Australians (especially Aboriginal Australians) and sometimes South Sea Islanders, most commonly among themselves.

Similarly, the term whitefella, especially in Indigenous use, refers to non-Indigenous or European Australians.

== See also ==
- "Blackfella/Whitefella", a song by Warumpi Band, co-written by singer George Rrurrambu and guitarist Neil Murray.
- Blackfella Films, a film production company founded and run by Rachel Perkins
- Blackfellas, 1993 film adaptation of Archie Weller's 1981 novel The Day of the Dog
- Indigenous Australians § Terms "Black" and "Blackfella"
- Koori, demonym used by Aboriginal people in Victoria and New South Wales
- List of Australian Aboriginal group names
- Black Australians (disambiguation)
