= Go Bush! =

Studio album by Warumpi Band
- Released: April 1987
- Genres: Post-punk; Aboriginal rock
- Labels: Parole Records, Festival Records
- Producers: Neil Murray, David Price

Warumpi Band chronology
Big Name, No Blankets (1985)	Go Bush! (1987)	Too Much Humbug (1996)

Singles from Go Bush!
- 1. "My Island Home" Released: 12 January 1987; 2. "No Fear" / "Tjiluru Tijiluru" Released: May 1987

Go Bush! is the second studio album by Australian band, Warumpi Band. It was released in April 1987.

At the ARIA Music Awards of 1988, the album was nominated for Best Indigenous Release.

== Reception ==
Professional ratings
Review scores
Source	Rating
AllMusic	4.5/5 stars

Curtis Zimmermann from AllMusic said "Go Bush! is an edgy blend of hard rock, new wave, and country-rock. The album tends to provoke a whirlwind of emotions with its inspiring political anthems and hard-driving protest songs. The intense opener 'No Fear', a song about hometown violence, sets the tone for the album that despite its upbeat feel has rather dark undertones. Some songs try to hide their anger with a catchy melody. From the Bush, however, is a bombastic assault against contemporary Australia." Zimmermann concluded saying "With its musical diversity and bold statements Go Bush! is easily one of the best Aboriginal rock albums to come out of the '80s".

== Track listing ==
Go Bush!
No.	Title	Writer(s)	Length
1.	"No Fear"		3:46
2.	"Jailanguru Pakarnu (Out from Jail)"		2:26
3.	"Yolngu Boy"		3:40
4.	"Secret War"		4:19
5.	"My Island Home"	Neil Murray	4:58
6.	"Didjeridoo Blue"		3:12
7.	"Kintorelakutu (Towards Kintore)"		3:24
8.	"Tjiluru Tjiluru (Sad & Lonely)"		3:58
9.	"My Countryside"		3:25
10.	"Falling Down"		5:16
11.	"From the Bush"		3:36

== Release history ==
Country	Date	Format	Label	Catalogue
Australia	April 1987	LP, CS	Parole Records, Festival Records	C 38707, L 38707
Australia	1990	CD	Festival Records	D 38707
Australia	2007	CD	Warner Music Australia	D 38707
Australia	November 2022	LP	Warner Music Australia	5419712887
