= Ilbijerri Theatre Company =

Australian Aboriginal theatre company based in Melbourne

Ilbijerri Theatre Company, formerly Ilbijerri Aboriginal and Torres Strait Islander Theatre Cooperative and also known simply as Ilbijerri, styled ILBIJERRI, is an Australian theatre company based in Melbourne that creates theatre creatively controlled by Indigenous artists.

== History ==
Ilbijerri was founded in 1990 as Ilbijerri Aboriginal and Torres Strait Islander Theatre Cooperative by a group of Aboriginal and Torres Strait Islander artists galvanised to tell Indigenous stories from an Indigenous perspective. Ilbijerri, pronounced il BIDGE er ree, is a Woiwurrung language word meaning "coming together for ceremony".

Theatre and film producer, director, and writer John Harvey was general manager and co-CEO of Ilbijerri with Rachael Maza. In 2025, Andrea James, a Yorta Yorta/Gunaikurnai woman, was appointed Artistic Director and co-CEO, replacing Maza.

Dancer and choreographer Daniel Riley worked as associate producer and then creative associate for Ilbijerri between 2019 and 2021.

== Notable productions ==
- Stolen by Jane Harrison, commissioned in 1992 and first performed in a 1998 co-production with Playbox Theatre
- Jack Charles v The Crown, about the life of Jack Charles, which premiered in 2010 at the Melbourne Festival. Charles was nominated for a Helpmann Award for Best Male Actor in a Play for his performance in the play in 2012, and the play was also nominated for Best Direction of a Play. The show toured across Australia and internationally, and in 2014, Ilbijerri was joint winner of a Drover Award from APACA, and Ilbijerri Theatre, toured by Performing Lines, won the Helpmann Award for Best Regional Touring Production. and in the same year
- Beautiful One Day, a theatrical documentary about events on Palm Island (co-produced with Belvoir and version 1.0), which also played at London's Southbank Centre as part of the 2015 Origins Festival of First Nations
- Coranderrk: We Will Show the Country, a verbatim theatre work based on historical events at Coranderrk, a former Aboriginal reserve in Victoria. Giordano Nanni and Yorta Yorta/Kurnai playwright Andrea James wrote the play, and it was co-produced with La Mama Theatre, in collaboration with the University of Melbourne. It was performed at the Playhouse at Sydney Opera House in June/July 2012.
- In 2016, Ilbijerri performed a tanderrum ceremony to open the Melbourne Festival
- Coranderrk, a recreation of the 1881 Coranderrk inquiry, was co-produced with Belvoir Theatre in 2017.
- Black Ties, co-written by John Harvey and Tainui Tukiwaho , is a story about a cross-cultural relationship between a Māori woman and an Aboriginal man. It was first performed for the Sydney Festival in January 2020, starring Jack Charles, Mark Coles Smith, and Lisa Maza, and co-directed by Rachael Maza Long with Tainui Tukiwaho. It then toured to Perth, Melbourne, and then Wellington and Auckland in New Zealand in February and March of that year.,
- Big Name, No Blanket, a musical based on the story of the Warumpi Band, premiered in January 2024 at the Sydney Festival. It was written by Andrea James with Sammy Butcher and his daughter Anyupa Butcher, and co-directed by Rachael Maza and Anyupa Butcher. Baykali Ganambarr plays Sammy Butcher. The show was also performed at the RISING Festival in Melbourne, Darwin Festival, and Brisbane Festival. In October 2024 a slightly scaled-down version of the show was undertaking a tour of 16 prisons, supported by the Balnaves Foundation.

== See also ==
- Indigenous theatre in Australia
