= Jennifer Kent =

Australian actress, writer, and director

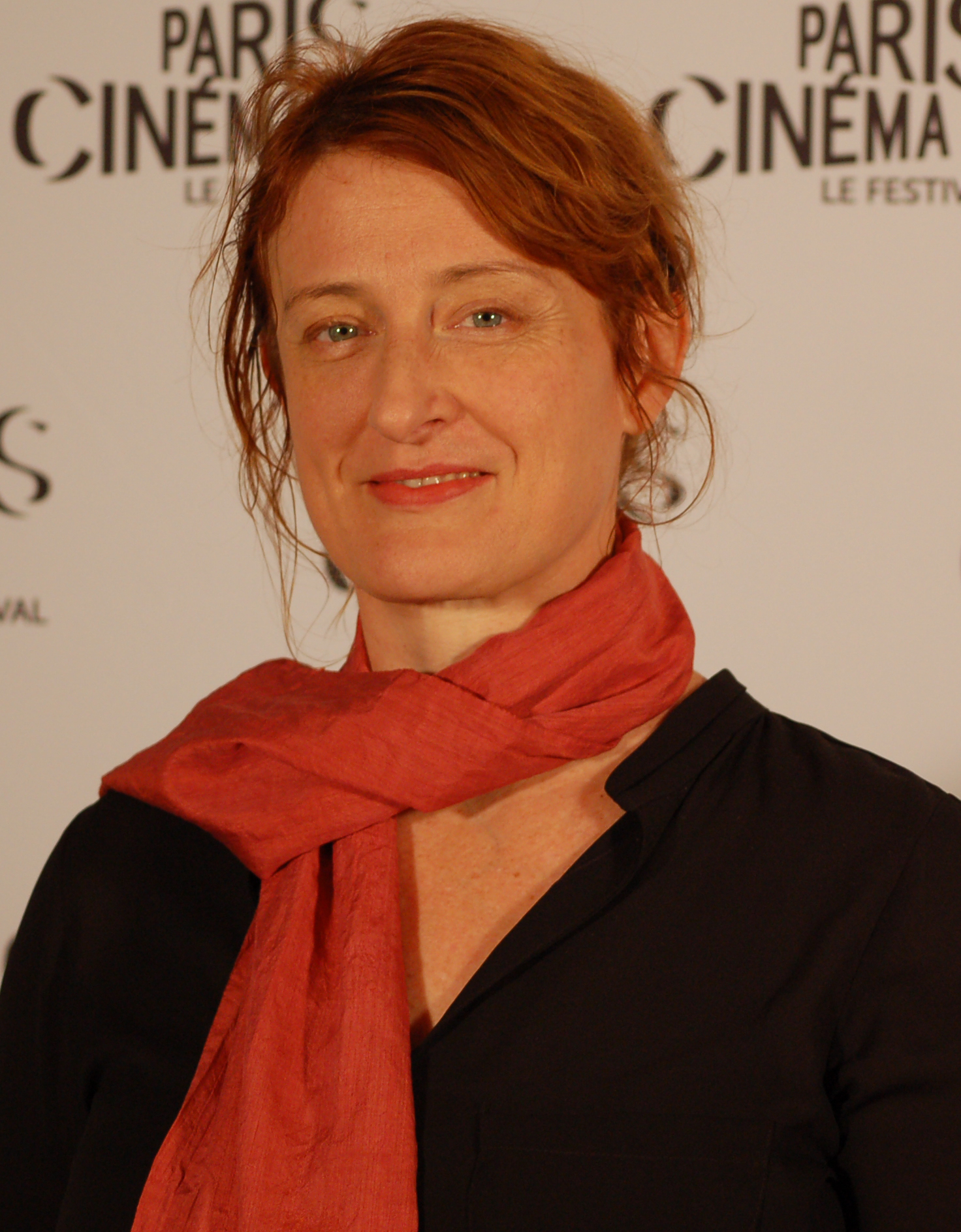
- Kent at Festival Paris Cinéma in July 2014
- Born: Brisbane, Queensland, Australia
- Education: National Institute of Dramatic Art
- Occupations: Filmmaker; actress
- Years active: 1992–present

Jennifer Kent is an Australian director, screenwriter, and former actress. She is best known for writing and directing the psychological horror film The Babadook (2014). Her second film, The Nightingale (2018), premiered at the 75th Venice International Film Festival and was nominated for the Golden Lion.

== Early life and education ==
Jennifer Kent was born in Brisbane, Queensland. She says that she put on her first play when she was seven and also wrote stories. In an interview with Paul Risker, she states, "I actually started writing my own plays as a kid: directing and acting in them," and that "it was something that was very organic for me." In her late teens, she chose acting as she "wasn't really aware at that stage that women could direct films". While growing up, there weren't many female filmmakers in her region, so she aspired to become an actress and attend the National Institute of Dramatic Art (NIDA).

She graduated in 1991 from the National Institute of Dramatic Art (NIDA) in Performing Arts (Acting).

By the end of her journey with education, she claims she "was burnt out and had terrible stage fright," in a masterclass interview that took place in August 2020. After a while, she figured that acting wasn't for her after all, but wanted to continue writing and directing. Kent described her writing process as bad, resulting in her becoming doubtful of her ability to be a director. As she continued writing, however, the feeling that she could succeed became more apparent. A strong, memorable moment for her is when she viewed the film Dancer in the Dark, a film written and directed by Lars von Trier. At the end of the viewing, she leaped into the air and stated, "I'm going to work with the man who made this film." She was eventually offered the opportunity to spend a day on set, and after that experience, she ultimately realized that she was capable of becoming a director and writer.

== Career ==
=== Acting ===
Kent began her career as an actress, working primarily in television. She was a main cast member of Murder Call, from creator Hal McElroy, playing Constable, Dee Suzeraine, in all 31 episodes of the series. She also appeared in several episodes of other Australian TV series such as All Saints, Police Rescue and Above the Law. Kent also had a small role in Babe: Pig in the City and The New Adventures of Black Beauty. She has also been an acting teacher for 13 years at major institutions such as NIDA and the Australian Film Television and Radio School (AFTRS).

=== Directing ===
After losing interest in acting, Kent was inspired after seeing Dancer in the Dark to pursue a career as a filmmaker. She wrote to the director Lars von Trier, asking to study under him and explaining that she found the idea of film school repellent. In 2002 von Trier allowed her to assist him as part of a directing attachment on the set of his film Dogville (2003) starring Nicole Kidman. In a journal by Paul Risker, which speaks about "The Quarterly Review of Film & Video", Kent shared her journey on becoming a director. While working with Lars von Trier, she "learned a lot about directing watching him at work." In 2006 Kent directed an episode of Two Twisted, an Australian series following in the tradition of The Twilight Zone.

In 2005 Kent directed her short film Monster, which was screened at over 50 festivals around the world, including Telluride, Montreal World, and Slamdance film festivals, SXSW, and Aspen Shortsfest.

While she didn't make this short film with the idea of The Babadook already in mind, she says people think otherwise. She claims that without this short film, The Babadook wouldn't have been possible. Before making The Babadook, Kent made three to four full-length feature scripts that couldn't get funded within Australia. She was left with two choices: give up or go outside of Australia. She states that Binger, a film lab in Amsterdam that acts as a creative residence for writers and directors, helped support Kent through the creation of The Babadook and, ultimately, saved her creative life. In 2014 she adapted her short into a feature-length film The Babadook starring Essie Davis whom Kent had known through drama school. The film tells the story of a single mother played by Davis who must confront a sinister presence in her home while dealing with the emotional fallout of her husband's death. Kent explains "[she] was always quite fascinated by people who could suppress really dark, deep, painful experiences and [she] wanted to explore the idea that perhaps pushing down on those terrible experiences is harder than facing them". The Babadook premiered at the 2014 Sundance Film Festival, and was quickly picked up for distribution in the U.S. by IFC Films. Kent did five drafts of the feature script, received most of her funding from the South Australian Film Corporation, then conducted a Kickstarter campaign to help raise US$30,000 to pay for set construction. The Babadook received widespread critical acclaim, and doubled its budget with $4.9 million in the worldwide box office. The Babadook script won the Betty Roland Prize for Scriptwriting at the 2015 New South Wales Premier's Literary Awards.

Kent has been vocal in the press about the lack of female directors in horror cinema. "It will shift, as the world shifts. Women do love watching scary films. It's been proven, and they've done all the tests. The demographics are half men, and half women. And we know fear. It's not like we can't explore the subject."

Kent met with executives at Warner Bros. in late 2014 to talk about possibly directing the Wonder Woman film, a job which eventually went to Patty Jenkins.

Later in March 2017, Jennifer Kent began the production of The Nightingale, starring Aisling Franciosi and Baykali Ganambarr, who play Clare Carroll and Billy. The film takes place in 1825 and tells a story of Clare, who seeks vengeance, and a tracker named Billy, whom she hires.

While making the film, Kent felt that she couldn't authentically tell the story unless she collaborated with Tasmanian Aboriginal people. While in Tasmania, she eventually got in touch with Jim Everett, who became a part of the film's production. In an interview called "Once Upon a Time in Van Diemen's Land" by Graham Fuller, Kent shared, "We enlisted 'Uncle' Jim Everett, a Tasmanian Aboriginal Elder, who could speak directly to the experience." She also states that without Jim Everett's vast input, she wouldn't have made Billy as real as possible. She also stated that Nightingale "was the only movie directed by a woman to play in competition at the Venice Film Festival last year."

=== Style and themes ===
When designing the soundtrack for The Babadook, Kent states, "I think a lot of modern horror films tend to just think a loud sound is an assault, and that's a way to scare people." According to Kent, sound, an effect in film she adores, is extremely important to horror films. She explains that "we worked very hard with the Babadook soundtrack to make something that was truly unsettling." While creating the voice of The Babadook, she described the process as one of trial and error. Afraid that the character would sound stupid, she waited to finalize sound designs until she heard the one sound that made the hair on the back of her neck stand up.

When initially designing the Babadook's appearance, Kent was inspired by Lon Chaney's makeup design in London After Midnight (1927). When building a character, Kent starts with a feeling of something that, at first, is amorphous, as she describes it. With the Babadook, Kent was drawn to the feeling of grief and its impact if left undiscussed. Kent claims the Babadook, inspired by the idea of facing grief, thus came to her and "wanted to be discussed" in "a scary form" due to the fact that grief, itself, is a "fear of feeling" and a "definite specific terror."

==== The Babadook (2014) ====
When making films, Kent explains she tends to start writing from an idea. While making the film The Babadook, she shared that she was in the process of grieving. She didn't want the idea behind the film to surround that feeling of grief, but instead suppression due to a fascination she had with the idea of someone unable to go through the process of a big loss. This gave her the "lightning bolt," as she describes it, which came to her and allowed the film to grow.

Her first feature-length film, The Babadook, is a supernatural horror film written and directed by Kent. In late 2014, Kent announced that, due to popular demand, a limited edition of the Mister Babadook pop-up book featured in her film The Babadook would be published in 2015. Kent wrote the book in collaboration with illustrator Alex Juhasz, who had created the prop book used in the film. The book sold out its run of 6,200 copies.

==== The Nightingale (2018) ====
Her second film, The Nightingale, deals with murder and revenge in 1825 Tasmania. On Rotten Tomatoes, the film garnered an approval rating of 86%, based on 234 reviews.

The film received funding from an investment from Screen Australia and financial support from Kojo Productions and Screen Tasmania. The film ended up with a budget of two million dollars and grossed less than half of the costs, causing the film to be a failure at the box office.

==== "The Murmuring" (2022) ====
In Guillermo del Toro's television series Guillermo del Toro's Cabinet of Curiosities, Jennifer Kent directed a short story from Del Toro in episode eight of the series, titled "The Murmuring."

The episode stars Essie Davis and Andrew Lincoln. They play a married couple who have moved into a new home and use their work to suppress their grief. Kent explores the episode's grief themes and turns them into horror.

== Personal life ==
As an actress wanting to direct, Kent said she felt boxed in in some areas. In an interview, she recalled a time when she was younger and she told a friend that she wanted to direct. According to Kent, her friend, acknowledging the struggles female directors face, responded by asking "Why do you have to make everything so hard for yourself?" In some ways, Kent thought she was right, but explained that she has felt, as an Australian, she could not live in Australia and not tell the stories of others facing similar struggles of their own.

When making The Babadook, she met with two screenwriters to decide on production, and was asked if the film was real or psychological. These writers claimed a film could not have both, to which Kent responded, "Yes, I think you can." While making her argument, Kent referenced The Shining (1980) as an example of a film which does so. The response she was given was "yeah, but you're not Kubrick." Kent said that these were the kind of obstacles she faced as a woman in the process of becoming a film director.

The screenwriters denied her script, forcing her to change it. When she later returned with two altered pages, they allowed her to move forward with making the film. While it was the same script, according to Kent, "you have to fight hard and be slippery to find a way through to keep the script you want." Kent advised young emerging filmmakers to understand that resistance, disapproval, and rejection are part of the filmmaking process. She explained that the script for The Babadook was criticized heavily, the production, and cut as well. She said to be stubborn, but also to learn to take criticism and listen to great ideas.

=== Reception ===
During the making of The Babadook, she described seeing Essie Davis and Noah Wiseman working together, stating that seeing such a young boy with emotional intelligence and commitment stunned her. Kent said that one of the reasons she makes films is to reach people. In an academic journal that recorded an interview discussing the film, she states, "The process of completing Babadook has really given me the confidence that yes, I can actually make a film, and that my ideas can reach people."

In an interview given by Collider, she revealed that someone who had recently lost their father reached out to her and explained that it was just their mom with three boys. He shared that when watching the film he was "drawn in" and, according to Kent, said "thank you, your film gave me more than twenty years of therapy." She explained that her film "really spoke to him" and that it was very "precious" to her, and that is why she makes films.

=== Future projects ===
When asked whether she would be doing a sequel to The Babadook, Kent said that she "will never allow any sequel to be made, because it's not that kind of film."

One of her scripts, Grace, won the Prix Du Scenario for unproduced scripts at the Cinéma des Antipodes festival at Saint Tropez, which presents films from Australia and New Zealand, but Kent said in October 2014, "The story of Grace was very much what I ended up making with The Babadook." She told The Guardian in May 2014 that HBO was courting her for a television series.

In June 2015, it was reported that the nonfiction book Alice + Freda Forever was being adapted into a film that Kent would write and direct. The book tells the real-life story of Alice Mitchell and her lover Freda Ward whom she killed in 1892. The film will be produced by Sarah Schechter.

In 2026, sales began at the Cannes Film Festival for an adaptation of The Girl Who Was Plugged In, which Kent will write and direct. The film is set to start shooting in mid-November in Australia, with Sophie Thatcher attached to play dual roles.

== Film techniques ==
The Babadook strays from the typical approach to the genre of horror by using a mix of psychological drama and horror and focusing on the imagination of children slowly turning into a reality. Kent does this by using horror elements in the layout and camerawork. The film uses German expressionist techniques; many of the scenes are disorienting and dark. Kent uses different approaches to the horror genre from classic horror film directors. As The Babadook progresses, for example, the Victorian-style house which is the main set mimics the mother's mental state.

Kent brought together a team of people she felt could bring her idea to the screen. Radek Ladczuk was the film's cinematographer and helped bring her ideas to life. Kent was influenced by old movies, and initially wanted to film the movie in black and white. She used many different techniques to embody a terrifying set, using colours like "muted grey-and-blue and hints of red as the story became more suspenseful". Ladczuk states that there were five aspects to this film, all shown with different camera movements. The film is split into five different emotions: anxiety, fear, terror, possession, and courage. By shooting with a 32mm lens they were able to capture the mother's feelings and later changed to a 14mm lens. They also used a Steadicam and static camera to help develop the film's layers. Fast and slow motion effects were also added throughout the film, as well as stop motion, and they even mounted a camera vertically on the wall to help with certain shots. A lot of the shots were done in camera because Kent felt that it made the film scarier and more realistic than adding stuff in with CGI later.

The Babadook is presented from the mother's perspective; the struggle of motherhood is a major component of the film's story. According to Clarke, many scenes in the film are relatable because they show the everyday struggles of mothers. Clarke argues that Kent touches on not only parenting but dealing with gossipy friends and sexuality, as shown in a scene where the mother is masturbating. These everyday themes are interspersed with moments of terror and suspense; techniques of classic horror. The film ends with the female lead taming the beast by defending her child, and keeping it in the basement.

== Filmography ==
=== Film ===
Year	Title	Director	Writer	Producer	Notes
2005	Monster	Yes	Yes	No	Short film
2014	The Babadook	Yes	Yes	No	Debut film and based on the short Monster
2018	The Nightingale	Yes	Yes	Yes	

Acting roles

Year	Title	Role	Notes
1997	The Well	Marg Trinder	
1998	Chlorine Dreams	Lisa (mum)	Short
1998	Babe: Pig in the City	Lab Lady	
2002	Six Days Straight	Meg	Short
2003	Preservation	Grieving Mother	

Other credits

Year	Title	Role
2003	Dogville	Production assistant
2006	Hunt Angels	Script editor

=== Television ===
Year	Title	Director	Writer	Episode
2006	Two Twisted	Yes	No	"Love Crimes"
2022	Guillermo del Toro's Cabinet of Curiosities	Yes	Yes	"The Murmuring"

Acting roles

Year	Title	Role	Notes
1992	A Country Practice	Penelope Rose	1 episode
1992–1993	The New Adventures of Black Beauty	Caroline Carmichael	11 episodes
1993	G.P.	Rachel Hardy	1 episode
1996	Police Rescue	Michelle	2 episodes
1997–2000	Murder Call	Constable Dee Suzeraine	31 episode
1999	O'Loghlin on Saturday Night	Fake producer	1 episode
2000	Above the Law	Geri Harrison	1 episode
2001–2003	All Saints	Joanna Hayes	3 episodes
2002	BackBerner	Various	1 episode

== Awards ==
Award	Category	Subject	Result
The Ellen Distinctive Achievement		Monster	Won
Audience Award (2006)		Monster	Won
Onda Curta Prize (2006)		Monster	Won
AACTA Awards (4th)	Best Direction	The Babadook	Won
AACTA Awards (4th)	Best Original Screenplay	The Babadook	Won
New York Film Critics Circle Awards	Best First Film	The Babadook	Won
Detroit Film Critics Society Awards	Best Breakthrough	The Babadook	Nominated
20th Empire Awards	Best Horror	The Babadook	Won
Best Picture (2014)	Horror Features	The Babadook	Won
Best Original Screenplay (2014)	Horror Features	The Babadook	Won
Breakthrough Artist Awards (2014)		The Babadook	Won
BloodGuts UK Horror Awards (2014)	Best Screenplay	The Babadook	Won
BloodGuts UK Horror Awards (2014)	Best Director	The Babadook	Nominated
Bram Stocker Awards (2014)	Screenplay	The Babadook	Won
CFCA Award (2014)	Most Promising Filmmaker	The Babadook	Nominated
Audience Choice Award (2014)	Audience Choice Award	The Babadook	Nominated
New Talent Grand PIX (2014)		The Babadook	Nominated
DFCC (2014)	Best Director	The Babadook	Nominated
Fright Meter Award (2014)	Best Director	The Babadook	Won
Fright Meter Award (2014)	Best Screenplay	The Babadook	Nominated
Special Jury Prize (2014)	Jury Prize	The Babadook	Won
Audience Award (2014)	Best Feature Film	The Babadook	Won
International Critics Awards (2014)		The Babadook	Won
Youth Jury Grand Prize (2014)		The Babadook	Won
NYFCC Award (2014)	Best First Film	The Babadook	Won
Best of Puchon (2014)		The Babadook	Nominated
Rondo Statuette (2014)	Best Film	The Babadook	Nominated
Special Prize of the Jury (2014)		The Babadook	Won
Prize of the City of Torino (2014)	Best Feature Film	The Babadook	Nominated
Special Award (2014)	Best Director	The Babadook	Won
WFCC Award (2014)	Best Movie by a Woman	The Babadook	Nominated
WFCC Award (2014)	Best Woman Storyteller	The Babadook	Nominated
ICP Award (2014)	Best First Feature	The Babadook	Won
CCOP (2015)	Best First Feature (Melhor Primeira Longa-Metragem)	The Babadook	Nominated
ADG Excellence in Production Design Awards (2015)	Best Direction in a Feature Film	The Babadook	Won
AFCA Coach of the Year Award (2015)	Best Director	The Babadook	Won
AFCA Coach of the Year Award (2015)	Best Screenplay	The Babadook	Nominated
EDA Female Focus Award (2015)	Best Woman Director	The Babadook	Nominated
EDA Female Focus Award (2015)	Best Woman Screenwriter	The Babadook	Nominated
COFCA Critics Association Awards (2015)	Breakthrough Film Artist	The Babadook	Nominated
Fangoria Chainsaw Award (2015)	Best Limited-Release/Direct-to-Video Film	The Babadook	Won
FCCA Award (2015)	Best Screenplay	The Babadook	Won
FCCA Award (2015)	Best Director	The Babadook	Nominated
Horror Society Awards (2015)	Best Horror Film	The Babadook	Won
iHorror Empire Award for Best Horror Award (2015)	Best Foreign Horror Film	The Babadook	Won
iHorror Empire Award for Best Horror Award (2015)	Best Horror Director	The Babadook	Nominated
OFTA Film Award (2015)	Best Feature Debut	The Babadook	Nominated
75th Venice International Film Festival	Special Jury Prize	The Nightingale	Won
9th AACTA Awards	Best Film	The Nightingale	Won
9th AACTA Awards	Best Direction	The Nightingale	Won
9th AACTA Awards	Best Screenplay, Original or Adapted	The Nightingale	Won
Special Jury Prize (2018)		The Nightingale	Won
Golden Lion (2018)	Best Film	The Nightingale	Nominated
Women Film Critics Circle (2019)	Best Woman Storyteller	The Nightingale	Nominated
Best Directorial Debut (2019)	Best Directorial Debut	The Nightingale	Nominated
Audience Award (2019)	Best Film	The Nightingale	Nominated
Rene Rodriguez Critics (2019)		The Nightingale	Won
Knight Competition Grand Jury Prize (2019)	Best Film	The Nightingale	Nominated
AFCA Award (2020)	Best Director	The Nightingale	Won
AFCA Award (2020)	Best Screenplay	The Nightingale	Won
FCCA Award (2020)	Best Film	The Nightingale	Won
FCCA Award (2020)	Best Director	The Nightingale	Nominated
FCCA Award (2020)	Best Screenplay (Original or Adapted)	The Nightingale	Nominated
