= Baykali Ganambarr =

Australian actor and dancer

- Born: 30 August 1993; Northern Territory, Australia
- Occupation: Actor

Baykali Ganambarr (born August 30 1993) is an Aboriginal Australian actor and dancer from Elcho Island (Galiwin'ku), Northern Territory. He is known for his role as a tracker in the 2018 film The Nightingale.

== Early life and education ==
Baykali Ganambarr was born in 1993 or 1994. He is from the Yolngu people from Elcho Island (Galiwin'ku), and speaks Yolngu Matha.

Ganambarr's older sister Rarriwuy Hick is an actress, who appeared in the ABC TV series Cleverman.

== Career ==
After posting YouTube videos of himself dancing, Ganambarr joined the Elcho Island dance troupe Djuki Mala. While still with the group, he was cast in The Nightingale, which was his first acting role. In the film, released in festivals in 2018 and in the US in 2019, he played an Aboriginal Tasmanian tracker named Mangana/Billy.

In 2024 Ganambarr began performing in the stage musical Big name, No blankets, created and performed by Ilbijerri Theatre Company about the origins and career of the Warumpi Band, in which he plays the role of Sammy Butcher. Ganambarr grew up with one of the band members, George Rrurrambu Burarrwanga, who used to spear fish with his family. The show premiered in January 2024 at the Sydney Festival, and later that year was also performed at the RISING Festival in Melbourne, Darwin Festival, and Brisbane Festival. In October 2024 a slightly scaled-down version of the show was undertaking a tour of 16 prisons, supported by the Balnaves Foundation.

== Recognition and awards ==
Ganambarr received the 2018 Marcello Mastroianni Award for his role in The Nightingale and was nominated for the 2019 AACTA Award for Best Actor in a Leading Role for the same role.

He was nominated for the 2021 AACTA Award for Best Actor in a Supporting Role for his role in The Furnace.
