= Elcho Island =

Island of the Northern Territory, Australia

Elcho Island Galiwin'ku
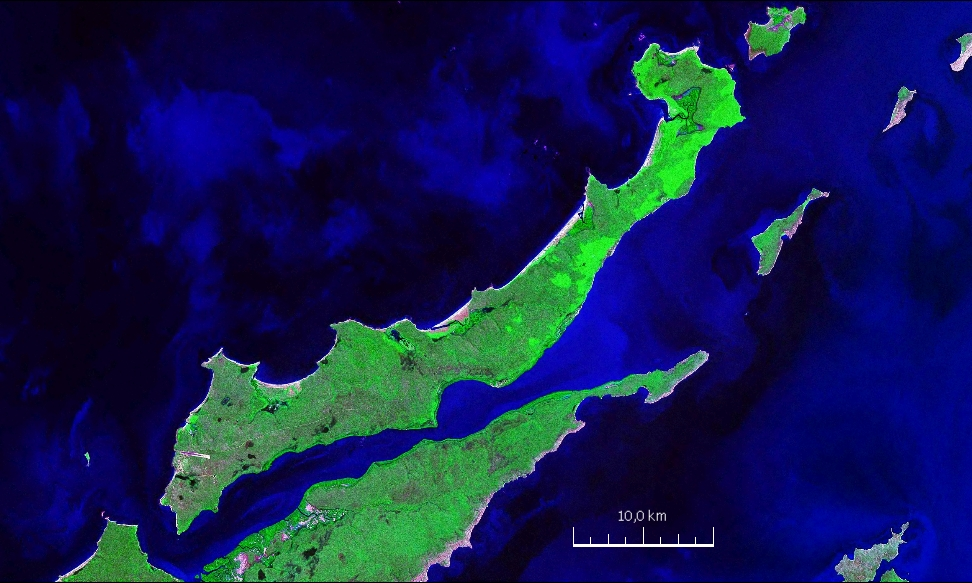
- NASA Geocover 2000 satellite image

- Interactive map of Elcho Island
- Coordinates: 11.92°S 135.80°E
- Country: Australia
- State: Northern Territory
- LGA: Unincorporated area

Government
  - Territory electorate: Mulka
  - Federal division: Lingiari

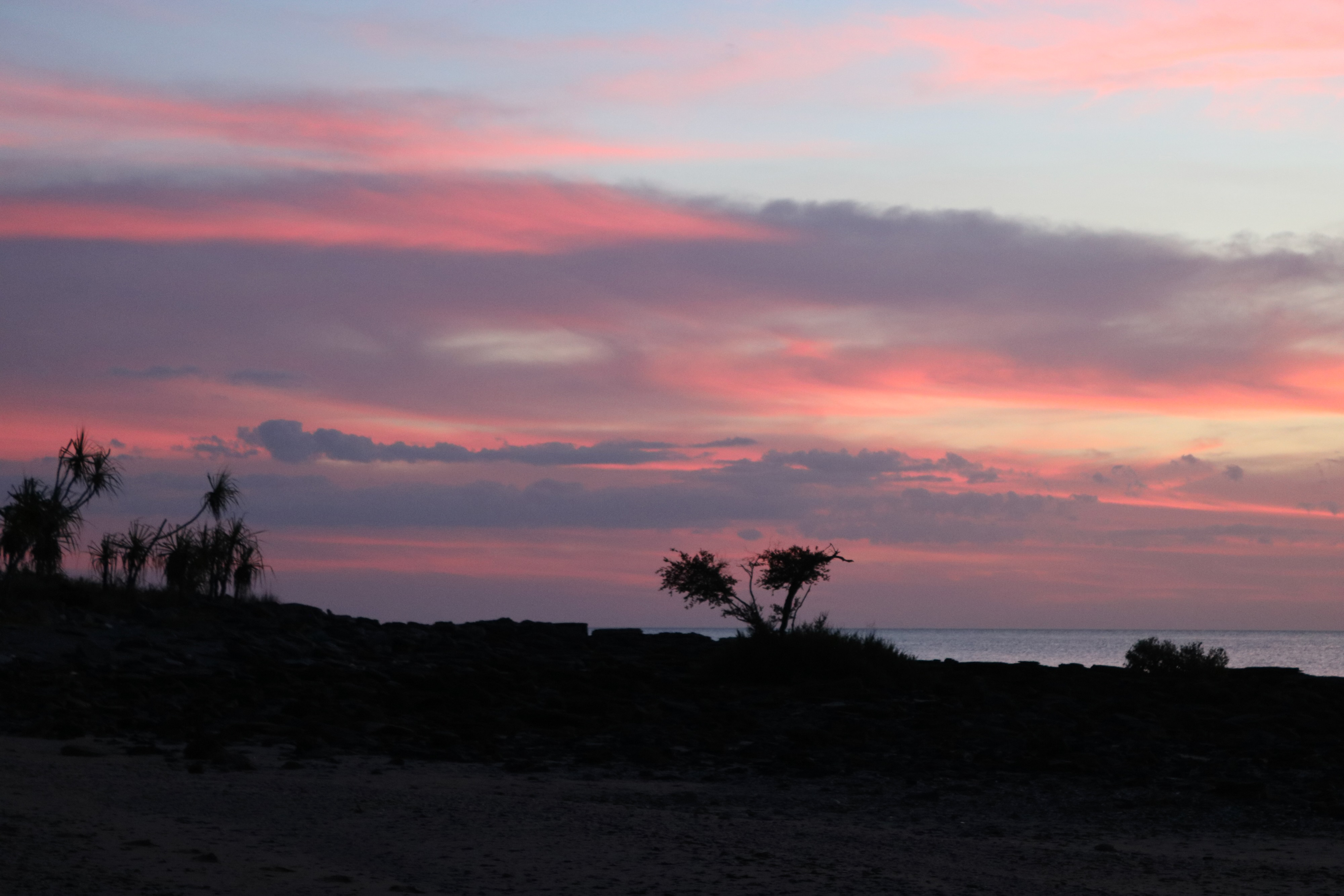
Sunset Elcho Island, as seen from Gallwinku township.

Elcho Island, known to its traditional owners as Galiwin'ku (Galiwinku) is an island off the coast of Arnhem Land, in the Northern Territory of Australia. It is located at the southern end of the Wessel Islands group located in the East Arnhem Region. Galiwin'ku is also the name of the settlement where the island's largest community lives. Elcho Island formed part of the traditional lands of the Yan-nhaŋu, according to Norman Tindale. According to J. C. Jennison, the Aboriginal inhabitants were the Dhuwal, who called themselves the Kokalango Mala (mala = clan).

== History ==
Elcho Island was named by the blackbirder and paddle steamer pioneer, Captain Francis Cadell in 1867 on an expedition to locate a suitable place for a colonial outpost. Cadell named it after Lord Elcho, who was the representative in British parliament for Cadell's hometown in Scotland.

The settlement was originally established as a Methodist mission in 1942, with the arrival of Harold Shepherdson, a lay associate of the Methodist Overseas Mission from Milingimbi. It remained under church direction until 1974, when it became self-managed.

== Geography and demographics ==
Elcho Island is approximately 60 kilometres (37 mi) long and 6 kilometres (3.7 mi) across at its widest point. It is bounded on the western side by the Arafura Sea and on the east by the Cadell Strait. Elcho Island is a short distance away from the mainland and Howard Island.

Galiwin'ku, located near the island's southern tip, is the main community on the island. It is the largest and most remote Aboriginal community in northeast Arnhem Land, the second largest Aboriginal community (in terms of concentrated population) in the Northern Territory, and ranks eleventh in population of the 69 local government bodies in the Territory. There are 60 mala or hereditary tribal groups, with up to 22 different dialects being used in the community. The lingua franca is now Djambarrpuyngu. The people of Galiwin'ku, approximately 2,000 residents, retain their traditions and culture. These are passed to future generations by adherence to strict traditional methods and education, including a means to help them embrace the wider Australian community.

There are also many outstations, including Inglis Island on the namesake island and Matamata, Maparru, and Gariyak on the mainland. The island has a base population of 2,200 people, including 70 non-Aboriginal people. It was the home of the late Aboriginal folk musician Geoffrey Gurrumul Yunupingu. The population of Galiwin'ku varies during the seasons, with many outstation residents migrating to the community during the wet season due to inaccessibility. The community also serves approximately 25 outstations with a total population of approx. 450 people, with 12 of the outstations on Elcho Island, which are listed from north to south:

1. Nanyingburra
2. Gawa (Gäwa)
3. Ban'thula (Gampura)
4. Djurranalpi (Djanalpi)
5. Dharawa
6. Gitan
7. Gulmarri
8. Watdagawuy
9. Dhayirri
10. Dyawili (First Creek)
11. Dadupu
12. Galawarra

Eighteen connected clan groups within the Elcho Island locale have close cultural ties with mainland Arnhem Land clans and language groups. The most commonly spoken languages are Djambarrpuyngu and Gupapuyngu (both Yolngu Matha languages). However, there are at least 12 more languages in use in the region.

== Facilities ==
Galiwin'ku is a traditional Aboriginal community with restricted access; permission to visit is required by law and can be made through the Northern Land Council directly or via the Galiwin'ku Council. Total alcohol restrictions apply and there is no petrol available on the island; all petroleum-powered vehicles use the low-aromatic petrol "Opal" as a fuel substitute.

The island is served by Elcho Island Airport.

== Geology ==
A "subsurface radial dyke swarm" of dolerite known as Galiwinku Dolerite (named after the township) occurs on the Gove Peninsula and continues under the Arafura Sea and on the Wessel Islands, including Galiwinku and Milingimbi Islands. The layer of dolerite lies under the Mamadawerre Sandstone.

== Population ==
According to the 2016 census of Population, there were 2,206 people in Elcho Island (counted as Galiwinku (State Suburb) in the Census Report).

- Aboriginal and Torres Strait Islander people made up 94.0% of the population.
- 97.7% of people were born in Australia.
- 78.1% of people spoke Djambarrpuyngu at home. 4.9% of people only spoke English at home.
- The most common response for religion was Uniting Church at 86.8%.
- 42.2% of the population is under 20 years of age, with 14% over 50.

== Services ==
The local government for Elcho Island is the East Arnhem Regional Council (EARC), formed in 2008, which services a total of nine remote communities of Arnhem Land. The Council delivers a range of services across community services and commercial services and, in doing so, they aim to support the ongoing sustainability of their communities as well as to support quality of life, employment and the provision of basic services. These services include:

- Aged and disability service
- Animal management
- Cemetery management
- Children and family services
- Citizenship ceremonies
- Commercial services
- Community patrol
- Environmental and waste services
- Library: Galiwin'ku Community Library provides books, magazines and resources for the use of community members; also provided is free internet, activities for children and local history information. Library services are provided to the community via Library & Archives NT and they are operated by local Indigenous Community Library Officers. In 2017 Galiwin'ku Library staff participated in Yolŋu Rom Napurrn Dhukarr: the Living Room Project, the development of a pilot classification system based on Yolngu knowledge, and replacing the Dewey Decimal System.
- Local emergency management
- Traffic management and local roads
- Youth, sport and recreation

=== Education ===
Shepherdson College is a bilingual school, teaching around 700 students ranging from birth to year 12 in Djambarrpuyŋu and English. Like nine other schools in the NT (including Yirkala School), it aims to teach "Both-ways": Yolŋu and Balanda (white person's way). It is named after the missionary Ella Shepherdson, who from 1943 taught students under a tree. Her husband, Rev. Harold Shepherdson, known as "Bäpa Sheppy" built the first school building with the help of Yolngu people, including one of Ella's first students. As a "Centre of Cultural Excellence", it teaches dance, visual arts, music and crafts. Artist and senior land custodian of Yalangbara, Mawalan 2 Marika, has been working at the school.

== Elcho Island Dancers ==
In 2007 a group of local Elcho Island dancers, the Djuki Mala dancers, choreographed and performed a dance routine to Zorba the Greek. The performance was recorded and uploaded to YouTube on 2 November of that year; in six weeks the video received more than 360,000 views, averaging 8,000 a day. Due to this success the group toured parts of Queensland and performed in the Art Gallery of New South Wales in Sydney in June 2008. They also appeared as the opening act at the Melbourne International Comedy Festival Gala 2009.

== Elcho Island Arts ==
Elcho Island Arts supports Yolŋu artists in sharing their culture and allows them to derive an income from selling their artworks. It provides assistance in production and professional development for both emerging and established artists from Galiwin'ku and the surrounding Marthakal homelands, and helps to promote and distribute Yolngu art. The centre has been community-operated since 1992, and includes well-known artists such as fibre artist Mavis Warrngilna Ganambarr, painter Peter Datjin Bararrwanga, carver and weaver Judy Manany and senior custodian of the Banumbirr Morning Star Pole, Gali Yalkarriwuy Gurruwiwi, among others.

In 2018, Elcho Island Arts was relaunched under the direction of senior artists Ganambarr, Manany, Burarrwanga, and Gurruwiwi.

== Discovery of an ancient coin ==
In 2018 a coin, thought to be from the medieval Kilwa sultanate on the east coast of Africa was found on a beach on Elcho Island by archaeologist and member of the Past Masters, Mike Hermes. Similar coins have been found on Marchinbar Island, also in the Wessel Islands group.

== Cultural references ==
Elcho Island was the inspiration for the song "My Island Home" originally written by Neil Murray for the Warumpi Band. The song was later covered by Christine Anu and she performed her rendition at the closing ceremony of the Sydney Olympic Games.

A memorial ceremony for George Burrarrawanga, one of the founding members of the Warumpi Band, was performed on the island in June 2007.

== Notable people ==
- Baykali Ganambarr, actor
- Cyrus Villanueva, singer
- George Rrurrambu Burarrwanga, musician
- Geoffrey Gurrumul Yunupingu, musician
- Leila Gurruwiwi, television presenter

== See also ==
- Australian Aboriginal art
- Elcho Island Airport
- Gawa, Elcho Island

== Sources ==
- "A Pictorial History of ELCHO ISLAND". Past Masters International. Archived from the original on 12 September 2017.
- Bauer, Anastasia (2014). The Use of Signing Space in a Shared Sign Language of Australia. Walter de Gruyter. ISBN 978-1-614-51547-0.
- "Father of Aboriginal rock remembered in traditional ceremony". Australian Broadcasting Corporation. 11 June 2007.
- "Galiwinku". Australian Bureau of Statistics. 27 June 2017. Archived from the original on 13 March 2018.
- Jennison, J. C. (1927). "Notes on the language of the Elcho Island aborigines". Transactions of the Royal Society of South Australia. 51: 177–192.
- Karp, Danuta (February 1987). Bore Completion Report Elcho Island Outstations (PDF). NT Water Resources Division, Department of Mines and Energy.
- Stratton, Jon (2013). "Whose home; which island?: displacement and identity in 'My Island Home'". Perfect Beat. 14 (1). Equinox Publishing: 33–53. doi:10.1558/prbt.v14i1.33. S2CID 163191067.
- Tamisari, Franca (April 2010). "Dancing for strangers: Zorba the Greek Yolngu style: A Giullarata by the Chooky Dancers of Elcho Island". La Ricerca Folklorica (61). Grafo Spa: 61–72. JSTOR 41548468.
