= Djuki Mala =

Australian dance troupe

Djuki Mala, previously known as the Chooky Dancers, are a dance troupe from Elcho Island in the Northern Territory of Australia. They first came to attention through a YouTube video of them performing to Zorba the Greek while in ceremonial dress.

Djuki Mala first came to attention in 2007 after Margaret Nyungunyungu recorded a video of the group performing in Darwin. One of the dancers was her son Lionel Dulmanawy Garawirrtja who came up with their routine to honour his sister's carer, a Greek lady named Liliane. As of June 2017 the video had over 2.7 million views.

Members have included Baker Boy, Baykali Ganambarr, Yalyalwuy Gondarra, Gadidjirrimiwuy Dhamarrandji, Bapadjambang Atu, Lionel Dulmanawy Garawirrtja, Mitchell Rang Garawirrtja, Wakara Gondarra, Marko Garmu, Wattjar Garmu and Tibian Cristopher Wyles. The group is directed by Joshua Bond.
