= Michael Sheasby =

Australian actor

- Born: Pietermaritzburg, KwaZulu-Natal, South Africa
- Education: National Institute of Dramatic Art
- Occupation: Actor
- Years active: 2010–present
- Television: Home and Away; A Place to Call Home; The Secrets She Keeps; The Luminaries

Michael Sheasby is an Australian actor, known for his roles as Steve Carmody in the Seven Network television soap opera Home and Away (2012), as Bert Ford in the Seven Network drama series A Place to Call Home (2013–2014), as Hayden Cole in the Network Ten psychological thriller drama The Secrets She Keeps (2020) and as Walter Moody in the TVNZ drama television miniseries The Luminaries (2020). wherein viewers were entranced by the authenticity of his Scottish accent. Sheasby re-joined the cast of Home and Away in 2026 as Phillip Osmond.

== Early life ==
Sheasby was born in Pietermaritzburg, South Africa and immigrated with his family to Australia in 2001.

== Filmography ==
Year	Title	Role	Notes
2011	Rescue Special Ops	Alex Reynolds	Episode: "Class of Their Own"
2012	Home and Away	Steve Carmody	5 episodes
2013	Felony	Policeman at Ankhila's house	Film
2013	In Your Dreams	Stefan	Episode: "Vermisst"
2013–2014	A Place to Call Home	Bert Ford	7 episodes
2016	Love Child	Michael	Episode: #3.10
2016	Hacksaw Ridge	'Tex' Lewis	Film
2018	The Nightingale	Aidan Carroll	Film
2020	The Secrets She Keeps	Hayden Cole	5 episodes
2020	The Luminaries	Walter Moody	Miniseries, 2 episodes
2022	Bosch & Rockit	Keith	Film
2026	High Country	Mitch Hamilton	TV series: 6 episodes
2026	Home and Away	Phillip Osmond	Guest Role

== Stage ==
Year	Title	Role	Writer	Director	Venue
2014	Henry V	Henry V	William Shakespeare	Damien Ryan	Canberra Theatre Centre, Canberra
2016	Arcadia	Valentine Coverly	Tom Stoppard	Richard Cottrell	Sydney Theatre Company, Sydney

== Awards and nominations ==
Year	Award	Category	Result	Ref(s)
2018	Casting Guild of Australia	Rising Star Award		
2019	9th AACTA Awards	Best Supporting Actor	Nominated	
