= The Nightingale (2018 film) =

2018 Australian drama film directed by Jennifer Kent

- Theatrical release poster
- Directed by: Jennifer Kent
- Written by: Jennifer Kent
- Produced by: Kristina Ceyton; Steve Hutensky; Jennifer Kent; Bruna Papandrea
- Starring: Aisling Franciosi; Sam Claflin; Baykali Ganambarr; Damon Herriman; Harry Greenwood; Ewen Leslie; Charlie Shotwell; Michael Sheasby; Magnolia Maymuru
- Cinematography: Radek Ładczuk
- Edited by: Simon Njoo
- Music by: Jed Kurzel
- Production companies: Causeway Films; Made Up Stories; Bron Creative; FilmNation Entertainment
- Distributed by: Transmission Films
- Release dates: 6 September 2018 (Venice); 29 August 2019 (Australia)
- Running time: 136 minutes
- Country: Australia
- Languages: English; Irish; palawa kani
- Budget: $2 million
- Box office: $988,687

The Nightingale is a 2018 Australian historical psychological thriller film written and directed by Jennifer Kent. The film stars Aisling Franciosi, Sam Claflin, Baykali Ganambarr, Damon Herriman, Harry Greenwood, Ewen Leslie, Charlie Shotwell, Michael Sheasby, and Magnolia Maymuru. Set in 1825 in Van Diemen's Land, it follows a young Irish convict (Franciosi) seeking vengeance against members of the Colonial forces of Tasmania who gang-raped her and killed both her husband and infant daughter. She is aided by an Aboriginal Tasmanian tracker (Ganambarr), who seeks vengeance for the British occupiers' Black War against his people.

The Nightingale premiered at the 75th Venice International Film Festival on 6 September 2018, where it was nominated for the Golden Lion and won the Special Jury Prize, while Ganambarr won the Marcello Mastroianni Award. The film was theatrically released in Australia on 29 August 2019 and was a box office failure, grossing only $988,687 against its $2 million production budget. Despite generating controversy for its graphic portrayal of rape and murder, it received critical acclaim, with particular praise for Kent's direction, the performances of the cast, and acknowledgement of racial violence in Australia. It is the first film to include palawa kani, a reconstructed form of the once extinct Tasmanian languages.

The Nightingale received a leading 15 nominations at the 9th AACTA Awards, winning 6, including Best Film, Best Direction and Best Screenplay, Original or Adapted for Kent, Best Actress for Franciosi, and Best Supporting Actress for Maymuru.

== Plot ==
In 1825, on the eve of the Black War, Irish convict Clare Carroll works as a servant for a Colonial force detachment commanded by Lieutenant Hawkins. The unit is visited by an officer to see if Hawkins is fit for promotion. Clare, nicknamed "Nightingale", sings and serves drinks for the men. After work, Clare visits Hawkins to make an inquiry, and he forces her to sing a special song for him. Hawkins makes unwanted advances to her and Clare rebuffs them. She asks about getting a letter of recommendation that would free her, her husband Aidan, and their infant daughter Bridget. But Hawkins rapes her for her perceived insolence. Aidan suspects that Clare has been hurt and tries to persuade Hawkins to provide the letter.

That night, Aidan engages in a brawl with Hawkins, his second-in-command Sergeant Ruse, and Ensign Jago. The visiting officer witnesses the incident and decides that he is unfit for promotion. Hawkins commands Ruse and Jago to gather supplies for a journey through the bush to the town of Launceston, in hopes of negotiating with the officer. Before departing, the soldiers intercept the Carroll family as they attempt to flee. Hawkins rapes Clare again and orders Ruse to do so as well, which he does. Hawkins shoots and kills Aidan, and commands Jago to silence Clare's crying daughter, whom he unintentionally kills.

The following morning, Clare awakes. She reports the incident to an RMP officer, but realizes that he's no help. She decides to seek revenge herself, with the help of an Aboriginal tracker named Billy. Clare lies to Billy that she wants to rendezvous with her husband who is accompanying the colonial forces. At first, Clare is openly racist towards Billy while he sees her as being no different from the English colonists who murdered his family.

Their mutual hostility dissipates, however, as they learn about each other's terrible losses and realize that they are both members of conquered peoples with persecuted cultures. Billy tells Clare that his true name is Mangana, palawa kani for "blackbird", the yellow-tailed black cockatoo. He wants to go north to reunite with the woman survivors of his tribe.

Meanwhile, the officers recruit three white convicts and an Aboriginal tracker, Charlie, for their journey. Hawkins takes a liking to one of the convicts, a child named Eddie. Ruse kidnaps an indigenous woman named Lowanna to be used as a sex slave. Aboriginal men kill one of the convicts and injure Jago in an unsuccessful rescue mission. Hawkins holds Lowanna hostage, then kills her, distracting the men.

He, Ruse, and the convicts flee, leaving Jago behind. Later, Clare and Mangana stumble upon Jago, whom the tracker assumes is her husband. Clare corners Jago, stabbing and beating him to death (an event that haunts her later nightmares). A shocked Mangana considers abandoning Clare, but when he learns the reasons behind her quest for revenge, he decides to stay.

Charlie, in revenge for the soldiers' brutality toward the natives, diverts the journey to a dead end on a mountain summit. Ruse kills him, but Hawkins chastises Ruse, as Charlie was the only one who could have led them out of the bush. He forces Ruse to take over as guide on the way back down.

After Clare and Mangana find Charlie's body, Mangana performs burial rites and tells Clare that he, too, seeks vengeance. The two approach the group of four men, but Clare freezes when she sees Hawkins, allowing him to graze her with a musket shot, forcing Clare and Mangana to split up. Mangana is found and forced to be the new guide. He brings the soldiers back to the main path to Launceston, and Hawkins orders Eddie to kill Mangana, but Eddie hesitates, allowing Mangana to escape. Hawkins tries to abandon Eddie, but when Eddie begs for a second chance, Hawkins shoots and kills him.

Clare finds her way back onto the main path and reunites with Mangana. They encounter a chain gang of Aboriginal men, one of whom tells Mangana that he is the last of his people. When the prisoner yells at his captors about their treatment of indigenous people, they shoot him and the others dead before proceeding to take their heads as trophies. Later, while eating dinner with a sympathetic English couple, Mangana weeps openly, lamenting the loss of his people and home.

In Launceston, Clare confronts the newly promoted Hawkins as a mass murderer and a rapist in front of his fellow officers. Mangana watches in hiding. The two flee town, but Mangana dons war paint, and returns, despite Clare's pleas that he will be murdered.

She follows as Mangana enters the hostel where Hawkins and Ruse are lodged. The tracker kills them both, but not before Ruse shoots and severely wounds him. Clare and Mangana flee, reaching a beach where Mangana sings and dances, declaring himself a free man. Clare sings a Sean-nós song in the Irish language as the two watch the sun rise.

== Cast ==
- Aisling Franciosi as Clare Carroll
- Sam Claflin as Hawkins
- Baykali Ganambarr as "Billy" Mangana
- Damon Herriman as Ruse
- Harry Greenwood as Jago
- Ewen Leslie as Goodwin
- Charlie Shotwell as Eddie
- Michael Sheasby as Aidan Carroll
- Charlie Jampijinpa Brown as Charlie
- Magnolia Maymuru as Lowanna
- Nathaniel Dean as Stoakes
- Luke Carroll as Archie

== Production ==
According to The Sydney Morning Herald, director Jennifer Kent was "deluged" with film scripts from the United States after the success of her debut film The Babadook (2014), but decided to focus on writing and directing The Nightingale. IndieWire reported that shooting for The Nightingale began on location in Tasmania in March 2017.

Due to the brutality of the film's scenes, psychologists were brought on set to support the actors.

== Release ==
The Nightingale was selected to be screened in the main competition section of the 75th Venice International Film Festival in August 2018, and had its Australian premiere at the 2018 Adelaide Film Festival in October 2018.

IFC Films bought the rights to distribute the film in the US and set a release for summer 2019, following its festival run. It was released in the US on 2 August 2019 by IFC Films, and in Australia on 29 August by Transmission Films.

== Reception ==
=== Critical response ===
On Rotten Tomatoes, The Nightingale holds an approval rating of 86%, based on 241 reviews, and an average rating of 7.5/10. Its consensus reads "The Nightingale definitely isn't for all tastes, but writer-director Jennifer Kent taps into a rich vein of palpable rage to tell a war story that leaves a bruising impact". On Metacritic, the film has a weighted average score of 77 out of 100, based on 35 critics, indicating "generally-favorable reviews".

Marcella Papandrea from The Super Network said "There is no doubt The Nightingale won't be an easy watch for most, but it is an important watch. Jennifer Kent has carefully and respectfully crafted a brutal story, spilling harsh truths along the way".

=== Controversy ===
The Nightingale received media attention following its initial screenings at the Sydney Film Festival, where approximately 30 of 600 film-goers walked out of the cinema due to its graphic depictions of rape and murder.

One viewer was heard shouting "I'm not watching this; she's already been raped twice", as she exited the cinema. Kent defended the decision to show such violence, saying that the film contains historically accurate depictions of the violence and racism that were inflicted upon the indigenous Australian people of that time. The film was produced in collaboration with Tasmanian Aboriginal elders. They asserted that this is an honest and necessary depiction of their history and a story that needs to be told. Kent said she understands the negative reactions, but said that she remained enormously proud of the film and stressed to audiences that this film is about "a need for love, compassion, and kindness in dark times".

At the 75th Venice International Film Festival, Italian film critic Sharif Meghdoud shouted, "Shame on you, whore, you’re disgusting!" when Kent's name appeared in the film's credits. The Nightingale was the only film directed by a woman to be included in the festival's main competition.

=== Accolades ===
Award	Category	Subject	Result	Ref
AACTA Awards (9th)	Best Film	Kristina Ceyton, Steve Hutensky, Bruna Papandrea, Jennifer Kent	Won	
AACTA Awards (9th)	Best Direction	Jennifer Kent	Won	
AACTA Awards (9th)	Best Screenplay, Original or Adapted	Jennifer Kent	Won	
AACTA Awards (9th)	Best Actor	Baykali Ganambarr	Nominated	
AACTA Awards (9th)	Best Actress	Aisling Franciosi	Won	
AACTA Awards (9th)	Best Supporting Actor	Damon Herriman	Nominated	
AACTA Awards (9th)	Best Supporting Actor	Michael Sheasby	Nominated	
AACTA Awards (9th)	Best Supporting Actress	Magnolia Maymuru	Won	
AACTA Awards (9th)	Best Cinematography	Radek Ladczuk	Nominated	
AACTA Awards (9th)	Best Editing	Simon Njoo	Nominated	
AACTA Awards (9th)	Best Sound	Leah Katz, Robert Mackenzie, Dean Ryan, Pete Smith	Nominated	
AACTA Awards (9th)	Best Production Design	Alex Holmes	Nominated	
AACTA Awards (9th)	Best Costume Design	Margot Wilson	Nominated	
AACTA Awards (9th)	Best Hair and Makeup	Nikki Gooley, Cassie O'Brien, Larry Van Duynhoven	Nominated	
AACTA Awards (9th)	Best Casting	Nikki Barrett	Won	
Saturn Award (46th)	Best International Film		Nominated	

== See also ==
- Tasmanian Gothic
