= Alice Mitchell =

Convicted murderer (1872–1898)

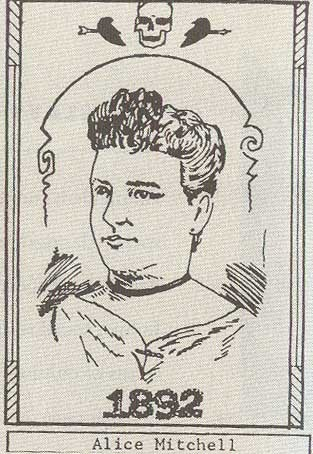
- Illustration of Alice Mitchell
- Born: Alice Jessie Mitchell; November 26, 1872; Memphis, Tennessee
- Died: March 31, 1898 (aged 25); Western State Hospital for the Insane, Bolivar, Tennessee
- Known for: murdering her lover

Alice Jessie Mitchell (November 26, 1872 – March 31, 1898) was an American woman who gained notoriety for the murder of her lover, Freda Ward. On January 23, 1892, the 19-year-old Mitchell cut the throat of Ward, then 17 years old. Mitchell was subsequently found insane by means of a jury inquisition and placed in a psychiatric hospital until her death in 1898.

== Early life ==
Alice Mitchell was born in 1872 to George and Isabella Mitchell. Alice was never interested in the toys that young girls were interested in. She was interested in playing on the swing in her yard, and playing both baseball and football. Alice had four siblings: her older brothers Robert and Frank, her eldest sister Mattie and her older sister Addie. She was closest with her brother Frank. Together, they played with marbles and practiced shooting with a rifle. Alice also liked horses and helped take care of her father's horse. Her mother tried to teach her sewing and needlework, but Alice never enjoyed doing this work nor was ever able to learn how. Alice was not interested in boys as a child as most girls her age were. In fact, as she grew older, she was sometimes rude to young men.

== Relationship with Freda Ward ==
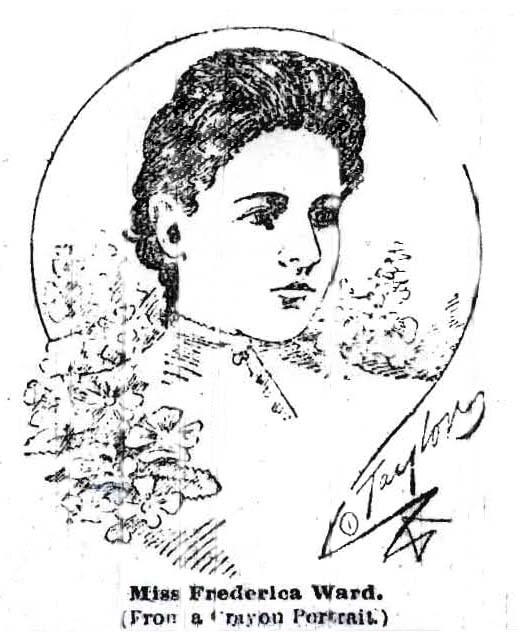
An earlier crayon portrait of Frederica Ward from the Appeal Avalanche

Alice and Freda met at the Higbee School for Young Ladies. They were very open about their relationship: they kissed, hugged, and held hands. This was not considered as homosexual behavior during this period and intimate female friendships were called "chumming" in Memphis. However, their relationship was more serious than "chumming", and Alice especially had an obsession with Freda. Freda's family left Memphis and moved upriver to Golddust, Tennessee. Because Alice and Freda did not live in the same city, they only saw each other occasionally. However, when one of them would make the trip to see the other, they would stay together for weeks at a time. When visiting, the two would share a bed at night. Freda was not as serious about the relationship as Alice was, and was interested in two men in addition to Alice. The two dated until Freda's eldest sister and surrogate mother Ada Volkmar forbade Freda to communicate with Alice.

== Depression ==
Alice had devised a scheme in which she would begin dressing as a man, marry Freda, and both would go to live in St. Louis as husband and wife with Alice (as Alvin J. Ward) finding work to support Freda. Freda accepted this proposal. Ada Volkmar discovered their letters, including the proposal, and sent a letter to Alice and to Alice's mother Isabella, telling Alice to stay away from Freda. Because their relationship was exposed and they were not allowed to see each other, Alice fell into a deep depression. She was rarely with her family, would stay awake at night, and ate very little. Alice would spend her time remembering her relationship with Freda: she would observe her photograph of Freda and reread letters. Alice often signed receipts with the name "Freda Ward" and claimed that she did not realize what she was doing.

== Murder of Freda Ward ==
Freda Ward was with her older sister Jo Ward and her friend Christina Purnell in Memphis when Alice slashed Freda with George Mitchell's razor. Freda, Jo, and Christina were heading towards the river to board the steamboat Ora Lee to head to Golddust. After following them in a wagon, driven by her friend Lillie Johnson, Alice saw Freda and walked over to her on thawing ice. Alice took the razor she had purchased to assist in her growing a mustache for her planned elopement with Freda from her pocket and slashed Freda across her face. Jo tried to protect Freda by attacking Alice with an umbrella, but the attack was not successful. Angered by the umbrella, Alice sliced Jo's collarbone. Freda, bleeding and disoriented, was finally killed by Alice with a deep slice across her throat. After killing Freda, Alice went back to the wagon and told Lillie Johnson what she had done and expressed a desire to kill herself. Lillie said she should go home to her mother and confess instead, which they did. Later, both she and Alice were arrested. Lillie was suspected of knowing Alice's plans ahead of time but did nothing to prevent it. Lillie was released on bond but Alice had to remain in jail.

Alice was tried that summer and declared "presently insane," meaning that she was insane before the murder. According to her own testimony, Alice killed Freda because if they could not get married, then there was no reason for either of them to live and no one should marry Freda if she could not. All charges were dropped against Lillie Johnson and Alice was ordered to Western State Hospital for the Insane located at Bolivar, Tennessee. She died there in 1898.

The case, which was exploited by sensationalist press, focused attention on the sexual attachments of women and drew out discussions of lesbianism into the public discourse. The case was headlined as "A Very Unnatural Crime" across the country. The case influenced the popular literature of the era which began to depict lesbians as "murderous" and "masculine". One identity that came to be thought of lesbians was the "mannish lesbian" creating dialogue of gender expression.

The case history produced by Mitchell's defense describes her as "a regular tomboy." In the courtroom, Alice Mitchell was presented as "insane" by her attorneys and her trial was not tried in criminal court but for questioning of lunacy.

This story was featured on Investigation Discovery's Deadly Women.

Mitchell's story is the subject of the book Alice + Freda Forever by Alexis Coe, which is being adapted into a film directed by Jennifer Kent.
