= Gawa, Elcho Island =

Gawa Gäwa
- Town
- Interactive map of Gawa
- Coordinates: 11.759444°S 135.905278°E
- Country: Australia
- State: Northern Territory
- LGA: Unincorporated area
- Location: 59 km (37 mi) NE of Galiwinku; 107 km (66 mi) NW of Nhulunbuy; 555 km (345 mi) NE of Darwin

Government
  - Territory electorate: Mulka
  - Federal division: Lingiari

Gawa is a place on Elcho Island in the Arnhem Land of Northern Territory, Australia.

Elcho Island is situated about 90 kilometres west-north-west of the Gove Peninsula in the Arafura Sea. Approximately 60 km long and 6 km wide, it is home for some 1,000 Indigenous Australians whose homelands are scattered on Elcho, several neighbouring islands and surrounding mainland regions. Elcho Island is one of the most remote communities in Australia.

== Early history ==
Historically, Gäwa, on the northern tip of Elcho Island, was a meeting place for Indigenous groups long before white people came to these shores. The seafaring Macassans from Indonesia visited Elcho Island to collect trepang, a sea animal that is to be found lying on the sea bed, a Chinese delicacy. The Macassans visited for a period of over 200 years prior to 1906 when the Australian Government stopped the practice. During that time, some Gäwa and Elcho people travelled back to Macassar. Since then some have made periodic visits back and forth. Many Macassan words, artefacts and cultural practices were adopted into the local languages and lifestyle. Macassan artefacts have been bartered via Indigenous trading routes as far as the southern and western coasts of Australia.

== European settlement ==
The first Europeans only moved to Elcho Island in 1921 and then permanently in the 1940s. In 1937-1938, Constable John William Stokes of the Northern Territory Police was stationed on Elcho Island at the future site of Galiwinku as part of an effort to eliminate prostitution of Aboriginal women by visiting Japanese luggers. He established a cordial cooperative working relationship with local people (see account in the book 'The Long Arm' and his now-published diary). Later, in the 1940s, missionaries came to live side by side with, and learn from their Indigenous co-workers. Most of these were committed to learning local languages, and training those workers with skills to equip them to live within the changing world.

Government policies of the 1970s encouraged missionaries to leave, and hand over their work to local people. Government policies tend to have a 4-year currency, after which there is always a better policy. With 2 year tenures, airfares home, and generous entitlements, (compared to mission rates), new government workers who did not have the long term commitment for Indigenous people, stepped into the gap, exposing Yolnu to further disadvantage and confusion caused by the rapid and unrelenting change.

Various enterprises were set up on communities everywhere; grazing, fishing, gardens, sewing, baking; some employing and training Indigenous people, others acting as supply bases.
