= Warumpi Band =

Australian musical group

- Origin: Papunya, Northern Territory, Australia
- Genres: Pub rock, post-punk, pop rock, blues-rock, country rock, folk rock, aboriginal rock
- Years active: 1980–1987; 1995–2000 (occasional reunions)
- Labels: Hot, Powderworks, RCA, Festival, Parole, CAAMA, Shock
- Past members: George Burarrwanga; Gordon Butcher; Sammy Butcher; Neil Murray

Warumpi Band (/ˈwʌrəmpi/) were an Australian rock band which formed in the outback settlement of Papunya, Northern Territory, in 1980. The original line-up was George Burarrwanga on vocals and didgeridoo, Gordon Butcher Tjapanangka on drums, his brother Sammy Butcher Tjapanangka on guitar and bass guitar, and Neil Murray on rhythm guitar and backing vocals. Their songs are in English, Luritja and Gumatj. Their key singles are "Blackfella/Whitefella" (1985), "Sit Down Money" (1986), "My Island Home" (1987) and "No Fear" (1987). The group released three albums, Big Name, No Blankets (1985), Go Bush! (1987) and Too Much Humbug (1996). From late 1987 to mid-1995 the group rarely performed as Murray focused on his solo career. In early 1995, Christine Anu (former backing singer in Murray's touring group, The Rainmakers), issued a cover version of "My Island Home". Warumpi Band regrouped before disbanding in 2000.

== History ==
=== 1980–1987: Career beginnings and peak ===
The Warumpi Band were formed in 1980 in Papunya – an outback settlement about 240 kilometres (150 mi) north-west of Alice Springs in the Northern Territory – as a country and Aboriginal rock group. Neil Murray was a Victorian-born schoolteacher and labourer who was working in the region. He met local brothers Gordon Butcher Tjapanangka and Sammy Butcher Tjapanangka of the Luritja people; and were joined by Sammy's brother-in-law George Rrurrambu Burarrwanga (aka George Djilangya), visiting from Elcho Island's Yolngu people. Murray provided rhythm guitar and backing vocals, Gordon was on drums, Sammy on guitar and bass guitar, and Burarrwanga on vocals and didgeridoo. 'Warumpi' derives from the Luritja word for a "honey-ant dreaming site", Warumpinya, which lies near Papunya. The band was first called Warumpinya Band, as "the band from Warumpinya", but this was later shortened to Warumpi Band. Over the years, many different people played in the band at various times. The only consistent elements were Murray and Burarrwanga, with Sammy Butcher generally being available when band commitments did not take him too far from home for long.

The group began by playing cover versions of rock 'n' roll standards and toured the Northern Territory and the Kimberley region of northern Western Australia. In 1983 at the Aboriginal Country Music Festival they were voted as best band and by that stage they were playing more original material. In October 1983 they released their debut single, "Jailanguru Pakarnu" (Luritja for "Out from Jail") on the Hot label. It is the first song released in a rock music format which uses an Aboriginal language, Luritja. For the single they were joined by another Butcher brother, Brian, on bass guitar. The track created mainstream media interest, and the group travelled to the interstate capitals of Melbourne and Sydney for gigs and TV appearances. Butcher said "It's about a jailbird, coming out of jail, trying to fit in with the family.".

Warumpi Band built up a loyal following in Sydney's northern beaches pub rock scene, and played as a support act to Midnight Oil. In 1985 the band signed with Midnight Oil's Powderworks label and released their debut album, Big Name, No Blankets in April 1985. Australian rock music historian, Ian McFarlane, felt although "[g]rounded in early American R&B and boogie as it was, the album was nevertheless an honest, enduring and bare-boned slice of indigenous country music". Big Name, No Blankets featured the single, "Blackfella/Whitefella", which appeared in October. The group undertook a national tour as well as playing in Papua New Guinea, Solomon Islands and Vanuatu.

In 1986, Midnight Oil and Warumpi Band embarked on the Blackfella/Whitefella Tour which reached some of the country's remotest locations. In July, while on tour, "Blackfella/Whitefella" was re-released as a track on the B-side of Midnight Oil's 12" shared single, "The Dead Heart", and included tour mate Coloured Stone's track "This Land". After the tour the Butcher brothers left and the group signed with Festival Records' imprint Parole Records. In October and November Burarrwanga and Murray were joined by Kenny Smith (later part of the Sunrize Band) on bass guitar and backing vocals, and American-born Allen Murphy on drums to record their second album, Go Bush!. It appeared in April 1987 and Murray Cook had joined on keyboards. In February that year they issued their next single, "My Island Home", which had been written by Neil Murray for George Burarrwanga after visiting Burarrwanga's homeland on Elcho Island.

The tour inspired Midnight Oil's album Diesel and Dust (August 1987), which became an international hit and brought the issues of land rights and aboriginal reconciliation into the national spotlight. For Warumpi Band the strain of balancing family commitments with the group took its toll and they were unable to capitalise on the groundswell created by the tour and their second album. By the end of 1988 Murray had embarked upon a solo career, although the band periodically reformed whenever it fitted in with their other activities. Murray issued his debut album, Calm & Crystal Clear, in 1989.

=== 1995–2000: reunions and disbandment ===
In 1995, Christine Anu (former backing singer in Murray's touring band, The Rainmakers) covered "My Island Home". Soon after Burarrwanga, Sammy Butcher and Murray reconvened Warrumpi Band for a European tour.

In April 1996 they released their third album, Too Much Humbug. The album was produced by Mark Ovenden (Yothu Yindi, Midnight Oil, You Am I). At the ARIA Music Awards of 1997 the track, "Stompin' Ground", was nominated for 'Best Indigenous Release'. In the following years, reunion gigs were sporadic, generally for festivals and other one-off appearances. In 2000, Murray resigned from Warumpi Band and concentrated on his solo career which had already provided three further albums, These Hands (1993), Dust (1996) and The Wondering Kind (1999).

Warumpi Band disbanded in 2000.

== Members ==
Various members were temporary, touring or recording only. From late 1987 to early 1995 there was little group activity as members pursued other interests.

- George Rrurrambu Burarrwanga – vocals, didgeridoo (1980–2000)
- Gordon Butcher Tjapanangka – drums (1980–1987, 1996)
- Sammy Butcher Tjapanangka – bass guitar, guitar (1980–2000)
- Neil Murray – guitar, songwriter (1980–2000)
- Brian Butcher – bass guitar (1983)
- Murray Cook – keyboards (1987)
- Alan Murphey – drums (1987)
- Kenny Smith – bass guitar (1987)
- Bill Heckenberg – drums (1996)
- Bill Jacobi – bass guitar, backing vocals
- Denis Minor – bass guitar
- Hilary Wirra – bass guitar

== Solo careers ==
Burarrwanga continued to perform as a solo artist, and released a reggae album, Nerbu Message (2004), which included his version of "My Island Home" as "Ronu Wanga", sung in his native Gumatj dialect. In 2007, he returned to his 'Island Home' on Elcho Island where he died from lung cancer on 10 June of that year.

Sammy Butcher remained involved in music with a recording studio in Alice Springs, providing recording opportunities for outback youth. He recorded his own album of instrumental guitar tracks, Desert Surf Guitar (2002).

Gordon Butcher Tjapanangka was also an artist, woodcarver, and Land Council representative for the Western Area. Died early 2020.

== Later releases ==
In 2015, Festival Records released the Warumpi Band 4 Ever box set, containing the band's three albums plus bonuses across two CDs.

In November 2021, Love Police Records & Tapes released Warumpi Rock: Papunya Sessions 1982, a set recorded on two-track cassette in the living room of a local teacher and is the earliest known recordings of the band.

== In film and theatre ==
In 2013, Screen Australia released the documentary Big Name, No Blanket about the band.

A rock 'n' roll theatre show performed by Ilbijerri Theatre titled Big Name, No Blanket premiered at the Sydney Festival in January 2024. The show is written by Andrea James, assisted by Sammy Tjapanangka Butcher as story and cultural consultant, and co-directed by Rachael Maza and Anyupa Butcher (Sammy's daughter, who works at Ilbijerri). The show was also performed at the RISING Festival in Melbourne, Darwin Festival, and Brisbane Festival. The show celebrates the journey and impact of the Warumpi Band, told through the perspective of the Butcher Brothers – from 1980 in Papunya through the highs and lows of their career. In October 2024 a slightly scaled-down version of the show was undertaking a tour of 16 prisons, including some maximum-security lockups, supported by the Balnaves Foundation. Maza said "It's not a deeply political work. It's just a huge celebration of blackness in all its glory, of what Warumpi represents – whitefellas and blackfellas celebrating Australia's black story. It's such a powerful message if we’re trying to think about a way forward". Baykali Ganambarr plays Sammy Butcher. The show also featured in the Adelaide Festival in March 2025.

== Discography ==
=== Studio albums ===
List of studio albums, with selected details
Title	Album details
Big Name, No Blankets	Released: 1985; Label: Powderworks Records (POW 6098); Formats: CS, LP
Go Bush!	Released: April 1987; Label: Parole Records (C 38707); Formats: CS, LP
Too Much Humbug	Released: April 1996; Label: CAAMA Music (CAAMA 259); Formats: CS, LP

=== Compilation albums ===
List of compilation albums, with selected details
Title	Album details
Warumpi Band 4 Ever	Released: October 2015; Label: Festival (FEST601040); Formats: 2xCD; Note: compilation album
Warumpi Rock: Papunya Sessions 1982	Released: November 2021; Label: Love Police Records & Tapes (LPRT003); Formats: LP, CD; Note: The bands' first recording session from 1982

=== Singles ===
Year	Title	Album
1983	"Jailanguru Pakarnu"	
1985	"Breadline"	Big Name, No Blankets
1985	"Blackfella/Whitefella"	Big Name, No Blankets
1986	"Sit Down Money"	
1987	"My Island Home"	Go Bush!
1987	"No Fear" / "Tjiluru Tijiluru"	Go Bush!
1996	"Stompin' Ground"	Too Much Humbug

== Awards and nominations ==
=== ARIA Music Awards ===
The ARIA Music Awards is an annual awards ceremony that recognises excellence, innovation, and achievement across all genres of Australian music. They commenced in 1987.

Year	Nominee / work	Award	Result
1988	Go Bush	Best Indigenous Release	Nominated
1996	Too Much Humbug	Best Indigenous Release	Nominated
1997	Stompin' Ground	Best Indigenous Release	Nominated

== Legacy ==
In January 2024 the Warumpi Band musical 'Big Name, No Blankets' premiered and this is written by Andrea James with Sammy Butcher and his daughter Anyupa Butcher.This musical is co-directed by Rachael Maza and Anyupa Butcher for the Ilbijerri Theatre Company.

== See also ==
- Luritja people
- Luritja dialect
- Gumatj language
