= Blackfella/Whitefella =

Single by Warumpi Band

from the album Big Name, No Blankets
- A-side: "Blackfella/Whitefella"
- B-side: "Fitzroy Crossing"
- Released: 1985
- Recorded: January 1985
- Genre: Country rock; post-punk; pub rock; Aboriginal rock
- Length: 3:25
- Label: Powderworks
- Songwriters: Neil Murray, George Rrurrambu
- Producer: Warumpi Band

Warumpi Band singles chronology
| "Breadline" (1985) | "Blackfella/Whitefella" (1985) | "Sit Down Money" (1986) |

Audio video
- "Blackfella/Whitefella" on YouTube

"Blackfella/Whitefella" is an Australian rock song written by Neil Murray and George Rrurrambu, recorded by their Aboriginal rock group, Warumpi Band, and released as the second single from their 1985 album, Big Name, No Blankets, on Parole Records and Powderworks Records. While not a chart success, the song drew attention to issues of racism in Australia through lyrics that encourage harmony and co-operation by people of all races. The song received national airplay and attention in 1986 when politically charged rockers and Powderworks Records founders Midnight Oil accompanied the band on a free concert tour of remote Aboriginal communities as the Blackfella/Whitefella Tour.

In January 2018, as part of Triple M's "Ozzest 100", the 'most Australian' songs of all time, "Blackfella/Whitefella" was ranked number 82.

== Background ==
Songwriter Neil Murray's inspiration for "Blackfella/Whitefella" came from his experience as a white man working in Papunya, a predominately Indigenous community northwest of Alice Springs in the Northern Territory from 1980. Although he was part of a minority, Murray found that in the isolated community, everybody was getting along, enjoying activities such as music and football. In 1985, after discussing the song and its message with band mates Sammy Butcher and George Rrurrambu, the latter suggested that Murray include "yellafella" (a term sometimes used to refer to individuals of mixed race) in the lyrics, broadening the message of the song to include people from all places. Furthermore, in the music video to the song, when the term "yellowfella" is used, East Asian Australians are portrayed.

== Other media ==
The single was included as an addition track on Australian and International 12" single releases of Midnight Oil's "The Dead Heart" released in July 1986.

A 30-minute documentary film entitled Blackfella/Whitefella produced by the Australian Broadcasting Corporation was released in 1987. The film inspired by the song showcases both Warumpi Band and Midnight Oil while touring together through Central Australia in 1986 and deals with both music and politics.

In 2012, a children's book of the same name containing the song's lyrics accompanied by illustrations by Australian children was published by One Day Hill. Blackfella Whitefella is part of a series containing the lyrics of iconic songs which are intended to educate children on the history of Indigenous Australians (Aboriginal Australians and Torres Strait Islanders) and their struggle for recognition and equal rights. The book was launched by musician Archie Roach, with a percentage of book sales intended to support the Papunya community.

== Cover versions ==
- Australian rock music band Powderfinger included a cover version of "Blackfella/Whitefella" on their 1996 single, "D.A.F.". A statement on the back cover includes "help support the indigenous people of Australia. Educate yourself."
- Aboriginal country and folk singer Jimmy Little covered the song on his 1999 album, Messenger, a collection of covers of 1980s popular and alternative Australian rock music.
- Australian singer Missy Higgins features the song on her 2014 album OZ, which includes supporting vocals by Crystal Itjuwalyi Butcher. "Oz", being a cover album of Australian songs, also features Neil Murray's "Calm and Crystal Clear".
- The popular song "The Bad Touch" by American alternative band Bloodhound Gang uses exactly the same progression as the main riff of "Blackfella/Whitefella", except their version is in Cminor compared to the Warumpis' A minor.
- In 2019, Australian Band Bad//Dreems ft. Peter Garrett, Emily Wurramara & Mambali (Brad Bura and Don Murrumgun) covered "Blackfella/Whitefella" for a Like A Version segment broadcast nationally on Triple J.
