= George Rrurrambu Burarrwanga =

Aboriginal Australian musician

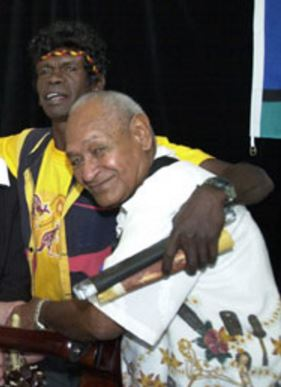
- Burarrwanga (left) with Seaman Dan (right) in 2002

Background information
- Also known as: George Djilangya
- Born: George Rrurrambu; 1957; Elcho Island, Northern Territory, Australia
- Origin: Papunya, Northern Territory, Australia
- Died: 10 June 2007 (aged 49–50) Elcho Island, Northern Territory, Australia
- Genres: Rock, Aboriginal music
- Occupation: Musician
- Instrument: Vocals
- Years active: 1975–2007
- Labels: Powderworks, Festival/Parole
- Formerly of: Warumpi Band

George Rrurrambu Burarrwanga (1957 – 10 June 2007), known in life as George Rrurrambu and George Djilangya, was known as the frontman of Warumpi Band, an Aboriginal rock band.

Burarrwanga was a Yolngu man, born in the remote homeland of Matamata in the ceremonial women's birthing area under a tree, like many babies from generations before him. He was then raised in the community of Galiwinku on Elcho Island, off Arnhem Land.

Burarrwanga's musical career began as a child through the education of ancestral songlines which his father, Charlie Matjuwuy Burarrwanga, mastered in depth of historical knowledge, pitch, tone and feeling. Matjuwuy was to become the most respected and sought-after Yolngu ceremonial singer across Indigenous Australian communities until his death in 2007 at the age of 50. At the NT Indigenous Music Awards 2004, Rrurrambu was inducted into the NT Hall of Fame.

During the late 1970s, he moved to the desert community of Yuendumu, with his younger brother who married Felicity Robertson and became fluent in the Walpiri language and law. George's brother and his wife had their first child, Glenda, who is a revered healer and strong advocate for the rights of community members struggling with mainstream culture.

Yuendumu is closely located to the community of Papunya, where families of both communities regularly visit one another. It was on one of these visits where George was to encounter two brothers: Sammy Butcher and Gordon Butcher, and their sister Suzina Butcher who George later married and had two daughters by. Sammy Butcher and Gordon Butcher, together with Neil Murray, were musing over backyard arrangements without the confidence of a singer. With his talent evident, George soon became the lead singer of the band.

In 1983, they released the single "Jailanguru Pakarnu" (Out of Jail), the first rock song ever released in an Australian Aboriginal language.

Three albums, Big Name No Blanket (1985), Go Bush (1988) and Too Much Humbug (1996), followed, including the anthemic songs "Blackfella/Whitefella" and "My Island Home", the latter of which was made famous when it was covered by Christine Anu in 1995.

Burarrwanga performed at a number of major music festivals, including WOMADelaide, the Melbourne International Arts Festival, the Adelaide Fringe Festival, and the indigenous music events Stompen Ground in Broome and the Garma Festival in Gove.

After the break-up of the Warumpi Band, Burarrwanga launched a lower-key solo career, performing to sellout crowds at the Festival of Darwin and appearing live on national television for the Yeperenye Federation Festival in Alice Springs during 2000. He then launched a solo reggae album, touring throughout the Northern Territory and then to Europe in 2002.

Throughout his career, Burarrwanga was active in promoting reconciliation and cross-cultural understanding between black and white Australians. In later years, Burarrwanga largely returned to traditional Aboriginal life, attending funeral and circumcision ceremonies with his father, a Gumatj clan leader. He was a proponent of combining the technical experience of white Australia with the knowledge of the land of the Aboriginal people to achieve more successful outcomes.

After his death at the age of 50 on 10 June 2007, he became known as George Burarrwanga for cultural reasons. Recently, his original Yolngu name has returned to use—the liner notes to the Warumpi Band 4 Ever box set refer to him as George Rrurrambu Burarrwanga.
