= My Island Home =

1987 single by Warumpi Band

- 1987 single cover

Single by Warumpi Band

from the album Go Bush!
- B-side: "Didjeridoo Blue"
- Released: 12 January 1987
- Recorded: 1986
- Genre: Rock
- Length: 4:58
- Label: Parole
- Songwriter: Neil Murray

Warumpi Band singles chronology
"Sit Down Money" (1986)	"My Island Home" (1987)	"No Fear" / "Tjiluru Tijiluru" (1987)

Audio video
- "My Island Home" on YouTube

"My Island Home" is a rock song written by Neil Murray for George Burarrwanga. It was originally performed by the Warumpi Band. The song references lead singer's (George Burarrwanga) home up at Elcho Island off the coast of Arnhem Land in the Northern Territory. It was recorded in 1986 and released as a single from their second album, Go Bush!, in January 1987.

It was covered by Christine Anu in 1995; she had been a backing vocalist in Neil Murray and The Rainmakers during 1992–1993.

"My Island Home" won 'Song of the Year' at the 1995 Australasian Performing Right Association (APRA) Awards for Anu's reworked version of the song. It was also listed in the APRA Top 30 Australian songs of all time in 2001.

== Warumpi Band version ==
Neil Murray, vocalist and guitarist for Warumpi Band, recalls writing the song:

My Island Home came to me on a bus one night in June 1985 [...] I had been living in the deserts of Central Australia for some six years [...] I had spent a week with our singer, George, at his home at Galiwinku in Arnhem Land. We camped on a remote part of the island with his family and had been living like kings on bush tucker and seafood caught by ourselves [...] I had to leave and make trips to Melbourne and Sydney in mid-winter to promote the band [...] I suffered an exceptional longing to be back in a boat on a tropical sea. The words came to me [...] I had no notebook with me. I held on to the tune till I got to Sydney and pulled my guitar out of the luggage to find the chords.

— Neil Murray

It was first recorded in 1986 and released on the Warumpi Band's second album Go Bush! by Parole Records in 1987. Rrurrumbu would later record a version of it in the Gumatj language for his debut solo album, Nerbu Message.

== Christine Anu version ==
"Island Home"

Single by Christine Anu

from the album Stylin' Up
- B-side: "Kulba Yaday"
- Released: 23 January 1995
- Length: 3:51
- Label: Parole
- Songwriter: Neil Murray
- Producer: David Bridie

Christine Anu singles chronology
"Monkey and the Turtle" (1994)	"Island Home" (1995)	"Party" (1995)
"Jump to Love" (2000)	"Jump to Love" (reissue) / "Island Home (Earth Beat)" (2000)	"'Coz I'm Free" (2001)

Music videos
- "Island Home" on YouTube; "Island Home (Earth Beat)" on YouTube

In January 1995, Christine Anu released a version of the song as the second single from her debut studio album, Stylin' Up. Anu, a Torres Strait Islander, changed some lyrics to reflect her circumstances. e.g.: Rather than moving to the desert, she compares island life to the city life, and from the point of view of a woman.

At the 1995 APRA Awards, "My Island Home" won Song of the Year. At the 1995 ARIA Music Awards, "Island Home" was nominated for Song of the Year, but lost to "Chains" by Tina Arena.

Despite peaking at number 67 on the Australian singles chart, it spent 20 weeks on the national top 100 chart. The song was voted at number 47 in the Triple J Hottest 100, 1995.

In 2000, Anu re-recorded a reworked version of the song for her second studio album Come My Way. Subtitled "Earth Beat", it removed the echoed effects during the choruses, but added subtle synth effects and more prominent guitar during the song, making it sound more rhythmic and polished, whereas the original was driven more with a drum beat. She would perform this version at the closing ceremony of the 2000 Summer Olympics, and the opening ceremony of the 2000 Summer Paralympics in Sydney, which prompted a reissue of the album's second single Jump to Love, but as a limited edition double A-side which included the song.

A music video was made for each version of the song. For the Earth Beat version, it intercedes between her singing, and an Aboriginal man deciding to drop his job as a cleaner. He starts running through the city, the desert, and finally to the ocean, where he swims to his home island and waves at his kid and wife.

In 2001, the song was listed in APRA Top 30 Australian songs of all time.

In 2016, Anu's rendition was inducted into the National Film and Sound Archive's Sounds of Australia.

In 2018, Anu performed the song at the opening ceremony of the 2018 Commonwealth Games on the Gold Coast.

=== Charts ===
Chart (1995)	Peak position
Australia (ARIA)	67

== Tiddas version ==
Aboriginal band Tiddas has also recorded a version of the song for the Radiance soundtrack.
