= Neil Murray (Australian musician) =

Australian musician and writer (born 1956)

- Born: Neil James Murray; 1956 (age 69–70); Ararat, Victoria, Australia
- Origin: Papunya, Northern Territory, Australia
- Genres: Aboriginal rock, rock, country, folk
- Occupations: Musician, singer-songwriter, writer
- Instruments: Guitars, vocals
- Years active: 1980–present
- Labels: Festival/Infinity, Aurora/Mushroom, ABC/EMI, Island Home/Universal
- Website: neilmurray.com.au

Neil James Murray (born 1956) is an Australian musician, singer-songwriter-guitarist and writer. He was a founding member of the Warumpi Band (1980–2000) which was the first major influential Aboriginal rock group with mostly Indigenous members. Murray was recognised as one of Australia's foremost songwriters at the APRA Awards of 1995 by winning Song of the Year for "My Island Home".

Murray has had a solo career since 1989 and had issued ten studio albums by 2023. Murray regularly performs throughout Australia, either with a backing band, The Rainmakers, or solo. He undertook a series of performances with Shane Howard (ex-Goanna), as 2songmen from 2006 to 2007. A similar set of gigs, One of those Tunes, occurred with Jim Moginie (Midnight Oil) from mid-2013 to early 2014.

== Biography ==
Neil James Murray, was born in 1956 in Ararat and raised on a soldier settlement farm near Lake Bolac in western Victoria. His paternal great-great-grandfather was driven out of his home in Scotland by the Highland Clearances and arrived in Australia in 1848. His grandfather showed him "blackfella stones" (remnants of indigenous artefacts including grindstones and axe heads) of the local Tjapwurrung tribe. He later wondered about the fate of the land's traditional owners. His family's farm raised sheep and crops until the mid-1970s. As a tertiary student, Murray studied art in Ballarat and Melbourne. In 1978 he started travelling through Australia, and by 1980 he moved to Papunya (about 240 km north-west of Alice Springs) where he worked as a teacher, truck driver and outstation worker, both there and at Kintore (about 530 km west of Alice Springs). In June 2011, Murray described his earlier journey:

It's not an easy road but those who really are meant to do it will do it anyway – they do it because they must, it's the only thing that validates their existence ... I was on a quest for meaning and that meaning I felt was to be found in the company of Indigenous people, the simple premise being they've lived on this land the longest, they know it the best. I wanted to learn from them so I kind of headed to the Territory because that's where I heard people still had their language and law and culture

— Neil Murray, ABC News

Murray, on rhythm guitar and backing vocals, became a founding member of the Warumpi Band alongside Aboriginal members, Sammy Jabanangka Butcher on guitar and bass guitar; his brother, Gordon Jabanangka Butcher on drums; and George Rurrambu (born Kumanjayi Rurrambu II Burrarrawanga aka George Djilaynga) on lead vocals and didgeridoo. The Warumpi Band were pioneers of Aboriginal rock music. In 1983 they released their debut single Jailanguru Pakarnu (Out from Jail) which was the first pop rock song recorded and commercially released in an indigenous language (Luritja). With Murray as a member, they released three albums: Big Name, No Blankets (April 1985), Go Bush! (April 1987) and Too Much Humbug (1996). They toured widely, including the Blackfella/Whitefella Tour through outback Australia with Midnight Oil in 1986. The tour is named for Warumpi Band's 1985 single, "Blackfella/Whitefella", which was co-written by Murray and lead singer, George Rrurrambu. Another single, written by Murray for the lead singer George Rrurrambu to perform with the band was "My Island Home" (1987). By the end of 1988, Murray had relocated to Sydney and commenced recording a solo album.

Murray launched his solo career in 1989 while still continuing to play with the Warumpi Band. By 2023, he had released ten studio albums, three books, and one CD of spoken poetry. His debut solo album, Calm and Crystal Clear, was issued in April 1989 on Festival Records' Infinity label. Murray described its sound as "outback rock with a slab of transcontinental drivin' thrown in". It was produced by Mark Moffatt (Mondo Rock, Eurogliders, Jenny Morris), and Murray used session musicians, including Midnight Oil's Jim Moginie and Peter Gifford on bass guitar and Andy Travers from the Happening Thang on drums. In February of the following year, The Canberra Times' Mike Jackson felt that Murray "does belong to the current wave of new country music that's sweeping the land, courtesy of the likes of The Flying Emus and ... Joe Sun. However, his songs have definite folk overtones to them".

Neil Murray and The Rainmakers were formed to tour in support of Calm and Crystal Clear, with an initial line-up of Murray on lead vocals and lead guitar; James Cruikshank on keyboards and guitar (ex-Widdershins, The Cruel Sea); Bill Heckenberg on drums; and Alex Hodgson on bass guitar. Bill Jacobi replaced Alex Hodgson on bass and Bob Jones stepped into the guitarist/keyboard role. That line up toured Australia extensively. In 1990 the Rainmakers were chosen to supported Midnight Oil's tour of Australia. By that time, the line-up consisted of Murray and Heckenberg; Bill Jacobi on bass guitar; and Russell Nelson on guitar, keyboards and backing vocals (ex–Matt Finish).

By 1992, Murray had added Christine Anu to The Rainmakers, initially as a backing singer. He asked her to take on lead vocals for his track "My Island Home". Murray's second solo album, These Hands, appeared in July 1993 and was co-produced by Moffatt, Jim Moginie (keyboardist and guitarist of Midnight Oil), and Angelique Cooper. By that time, Anu had left to pursue her solo career. In June 1995, she recorded a cover version of "My Island Home" on her debut album, Stylin' Up. That version was named the APRA Song of the Year at the APRA Awards for Murray as its songwriter and Anu as performer. The Anu version became an unofficial Australian anthem, and she performed it during the closing ceremony of the Sydney 2000 Olympics. In the following year, it was listed in APRA Top 30 Australian songs of all time.

Murray's second book, Sing for Me, Countryman, appeared in 1993, which was critically reviewed by those watching the career trajectory of Murray (and Warumpi Band) as being ... a thinly disguised autobiography.

In March 1994 Murray left Sydney to reside in Melbourne, and once there, began visiting his home area of Lake Bolac and having crucial meetings with the late Kirrae Warrung elder Uncle Banjo Clarke at Framlingham near Warrnambool. In 1995 he purchased a cottage on a small block on the outskirts of Lake Bolac, and increasingly involved himself with First Nations people of the region to learn more of their culture, although he also spent time living in the Northern Territory. The book was submitted for the Miles Franklin Literary Award of 1994 but was not short-listed. When in Victoria, Murray contacted neighbouring Gunditjmara people, Kirrae Wurrung elder Uncle Banjo Clarke and Archie Roach (a musician). Murray was mentored by Clarke and Uncle Ted Lovett as he worked on reviving and composing songs in the Tjapwurrung language.

In 1990 at, long time Warumpi Band manager, David Cooke’s instigation- Murray, Rurrambu and Sammy Butcher reconvened Warumpi Band with Heckenberg on drums and Brian Butcher for a run of dates from Alice Springs to Darwin. In 1992 they featured at the Broome Stompin Ground festival. David Cooke also organised a six week European Tour in 1995, with original drummer Gordon Butcher back on drums and Bill Jacobi on Bass. A new album, Too Much Humbug, appeared in April of the next year, which Ian McFarlane described as having "slicker production values than either of its predecessors". Murray also issued a solo album, Dust, in May that year using guest musicians Chris Abrahams (of The Necks), David Bridie (of Not Drowning, Waving), and Moginie; as well as backing vocals from Anu, Roach; and Sally Dastey and Amy Saunders from Tiddas. It was co-produced by Murray and Moginie for ABC Music's Songwriter Series. Murray was the subject of a documentary, Native Born, broadcast on Australian Story for ABC Television in April of that year.

Murray performed intermittently with Warumpi Band until 2000 while mainly working on his solo career with his backing band, The Rainmakers. His fourth solo album, The Wondering Kind, appeared in February 2000, which was self-financed and self-produced. By that time, he was based in Darwin, but he had recorded the album in Sydney during periodic visits over a year. For the album, he worked with Heckenberg on drums and percussion, and Cotco Lovit on electric, acoustic and upright bass guitar. Other musicians included Stephen Teakle, Brendan Williams, Seamus (aka Jim) Moginie, Lucy Eames, and strings by Coda. Seth Jordan of Rhythms magazine opined that the "apathetic music industry seemed unsure whether to categorise Murray's solo work as rock, folk or country, despite critical acclaim", while his live performances "continue to attract a dedicated audience amongst those who appreciate truly well crafted songs".

Murray performed with the Warumpi Band when required until 2000 while still mainly working on his solo career. After his move to Melbourne in 1994 the Rainmakers ceased to be a regular line-up and he increasingly performed solo or with side musicians. His fourth solo album, The Wondering Kind, appeared in February 2000, which was self-financed and self-produced. By that time, he was based in Darwin, but he had recorded the album in Sydney during periodic visits over a year. For the album, he worked with Heckenberg on drums and percussion, and Cotco Lovit on electric, acoustic and upright bass guitar. Other musicians included Stephen Teakle, Brendan Williams, Seamus (aka Jim) Moginie, Lucy Eames, and strings by Coda. Seth Jordan of Rhythms magazine opined that the "apathetic music industry seemed unsure whether to categorise Murray's solo work as rock, folk or country, despite critical acclaim", while his live performances "continue to attract a dedicated audience amongst those who appreciate truly well crafted songs".

In May 2003, Murray issued his next solo album, Going the Distance, which Martin Flanagan of The Age compared to the previous album "[grief] is also the subject of several songs on his new album... but the music is gentler now, lighter in touch". The album was co-produced by Murray and Moginie, Flanagan contrasted Murray's depiction of Tom Wills from the track, "Tom Wills Would", with his own understanding in The Call (1998) – a historical novel of the Australian sportsman: "I saw a man destroyed by the weight of contradictions bearing down on him, caught as he was between black and white culture. Murray sees a man who acted from choice throughout, even choosing a self-inflicted death ... His Tom Wills is the man who supports the local team when no one else will, who won't abide being dropped from the team ... He's the man who won't bootlick to authority". Also in 2003, Murray recorded a live version of "My Island Home" at a gig at Richmond's Corner Hotel.

By May 2005 Murray had released his first compilation album, About Time: A Song Collection, which consists of 2×CDs with one disc a "best of" collection from his previous studio albums and the other disc had "live and rare" tracks, including his 2003 version of "My Island Home". It appeared on his own label, Island Home Music, and was distributed by Universal Music Australia. In August 2006 Murray performed as 2songmen with Shane Howard (ex-Goanna), a fellow singer-songwriter-guitarist, at the Darwin Festival. The performance was recorded for a live album, 2songmen – Shane Howard & Neil Murray Live in Darwin, which was issued later that year. The pair also toured together into 2007. At the Dreaming Festival in Queensland in 2006 Murray played the last ever Warumpi Band gig with George out front singing.

Murray's sixth studio album, Overnighter, was issued in November 2007 by ABC Music. It was inspired by meeting fellow travellers at various roadhouses throughout Australia "when you are that strung out and tired, there is an unspoken camaraderie with those with whom you share the night and the distance. You might not speak but there is a kinship. It's not too hard to imagine their story". He toured eastern Australia in support of the album during May to June 2008. Witness, his seventh studio album, followed in February 2010. A track, "One of Those Tunes", was co-written by Murray with Moginie.

Michelle Slater of Australian Musician Network described Murray's performance styles in November 2012 as consisting of "indie rock, folk, jazz and country swing." She continues, "He made this gig unique with such an array of songs and stories. Upon leaving the venue, my aural senses were mixed with the reminiscent smells of a dripping tropical night and the red dust of the central desert". Murray and Moginie toured from mid-2013 to early 2014 under the banner of One of those Tunes. Murray's eighth studio album, Bring Thunder & Rain, was issued by May 2014.

In 2019, Murray released his ninth solo album, Blood & Longing, with two singles released - Byjantic Man and Cry My Darling. In the same year, Tjungu (All in one, joined together) was released with Sammy Butcher.

The Telling, Murray's tenth solo album, was released 31 March 2023 with Broken Land the first single first single and Tears of Wybalena the second. Film clips were shot for both tunes.

In March 2026 he released the single Still Here By My Side- being a precursor to a new album due out in early 2027.

== Bibliography ==
=== Published works ===
- Murray, Neil (1980), Starting Procedure: Poems & Prose (to read aloud), Alice Springs, NT: N. Murray, ISBN 978-0-9592205-0-6
- Murray, Neil (1993), Sing for Me, Countryman (2nd ed.), Rydalmere, NSW: Sceptre, ISBN 978-0-340-57856-8
- Murray, Neil (1999), One Man Tribe, Darwin, NT: Northern Territory University Press, ISBN 978-1-876248-42-0
- 2009 Native Born (song lyrics)
- 2010 My Island Home
- 2012 Blackfella Whitefella

=== Short stories ===
- "Home and Away", The Bulletin 1983
- "Boomerangs", Going Down Swinging 1983
- "Two Stones", Inprint 1983
- "The Risks of Two-up Motorcycling", Australian Short Stories 1987
- "One Last Hitch", The Edge 1989
- "Unmarked Graves", included in Banjo Clarke's Wisdom Man, Penguin Australia, 2003

=== Articles ===
- "A Guide to Boomerang Buying", On the Street 1983
- "Turning up the Stars Full Blast", Australian Playboy, 1984
- "Over the back fence", Follow me Gentleman 1986
- "He's My Brother", The Australian Way, July 1989
- "The Getting of Banjos Wisdom", The Age, 25 April 2000
- "Was True Blue a Blackfella?", The Age, 6 July 2002
- "Gunnedah Dreaming", The Age Review, 3 July 2004
- "No Flowers", The Monthly, 3 August 2005
- "How Many Sleeps?", The Monthly, January 2006
- "A Healing Walk", published 2009 in the University of Portland Magazine, Vol 28, No 2
- Murray, Neil (4 September 2010). "Deliverance – Now That's the Ticket". The Age. Fairfax Media.

=== Stage plays ===
- King for This Place, commissioned by Deckchair Theatre, Fremantle, Western Australia, 1999

== Discography ==
=== Studio albums ===
List of studio albums, with release date and label shown
Title	Details
Calm and Crystal Clear	Released: April 1989; Label: Infinity (D 38984); Formats: CD, Cassette, LP
These Hands	Released: July 1993; Label: Aurora (D30977); Formats: CD
Dust	Released: 1996; Label: ABC Music (4891312); Formats: CD
The Wondering Kind	Released: February 2000; Label: EMI (7243 5247862 0); Formats: CD
Going the Distance	Released: May 2003; Label: Neil Murray (NM005); Formats: CD
Overnighter	Released: 2007; Label: Neil Murray (NM008) /ABC Music; Formats: CD
Witness	Released: 2010; Label: ABC Music (2732302); Formats: CD, DD
Bring Thunder and Rain	Released: May 2014; Label: Neil Murray (NM011); Formats: CD, DD
Blood and Longing	Released: 2019; Label: Neil Murray (NM012); Formats: CD, DD
Tjungu (All In One, Joined Together) (with Sammy Butcher)	Released: 2019; Label: Neil Murray (NM013); Formats: CD, DD
The Telling	Released: 2023; Label: Neil Murray; Formats: CD, DD

=== Live albums ===
List of live albums, with release date and label shown
Title	Details
2songmen (with Shane Howard)	Released: 2006; Label: Goanna Arts and Island Home Music; Formats: CD; Recorded: Darwin, August 2006.

=== Compilation albums ===
List of compilation albums, with release date and label shown
Title	Details
About Time: A Song Collection	Released: April 2005; Label: Island Home Music Pty Ltd (NM006); Formats: 2×CD
Sing the Song –The Essential Neil Murray	Released: November 2011; Label: ABC Music (2783069); Formats: 2×CD, DD
Hindsight - Selected songs	Released: 2017; Label: Island Home Music Pty Ltd (NM012); Formats: 2×CD, DD
