= Indigenous rock =

Style of music mixing rock with Indigenous music

Indigenous or Aboriginal rock is a style of music which mixes rock music with the instrumentation and singing styles of Indigenous peoples. Two countries with prominent Aboriginal rock scenes are Australia and Canada.

== Australia ==
In Australia, Aboriginal rock mixes rock styles and instruments (e.g. electric (guitar, bass and drums) with Indigenous Australian instruments such as the didgeridoo and clapsticks. Aboriginal rock is mostly performed by Indigenous bands, although some bands include non-Aboriginal members.

Bands include Yothu Yindi, Us Mob and No Fixed Address. Yothu Yindi, with vocalist Mandawuy Yunupingu has politicised lyrics, such as 1991's "Treaty". Other songs relate more generally to Aboriginal culture. Another major band was the Warumpi Band, which toured with Midnight Oil. The Warumpi Band focuses more on the Aboriginal aspects of the music, rather than the rock sound of Yothu Yindi. In the 2000s, Aboriginal bands such as NoKTuRNL have adopted a rap metal or nu metal sound. Formal training institutions include the Government sponsored Aboriginal Centre for the Performing Arts.

Famous songs include "Treaty", "My Island Home", and "Blackfella/Whitefella".

== Canada ==
Indigenous peoples in Canada include First Nations, Métis and Inuit. Some examples of Canadian Indigenous rock bands or artists include Aysanabee, Breach of Trust, Kashtin, Bruthers of Different Muthers, Burnt Project 1, Digging Roots, Edward Gamblin, The Halluci Nation (formerly A Tribe Called Red), George Leach, Derek Miller, Robbie Robertson, Julian Taylor, Ruby Waters, and Tom Wilson.

== Ecuador ==
Several mestizo-bands in Ecuador made use of indigenous musical elements in rock music since the 1990s. Rocola Bacalao integrated Andean rhythms and made in their song-texts references to emblematic indigenous towns, such as Pujilí in Cotopaxi. Sal y Mileto and Casería de Lagartos coined the genre of new Ecuadorian Rock. Nevertheless, in the 1980s and the early 1990s the rhythm of the social as expressed in Ecuadorian rock was characterized by hopelessness and resistance or even resignation against repression. With the emergence of a powerful indigenous movement the rhythm changed. The most emblematic references towards the political impact of the indigenous movement are made by the metalband Aztra and the hardcore band CURARE at the beginning of the 2000s, during the heyday of indigenous social protest against neoliberalism and for (ethnic) democratization.

== See also ==
- Category:Australian Aboriginal art
- List of Indigenous Australian musicians
