= Sammy Butcher =

Australian musician

Sammy Tjapanangka Butcher is an Pitjantjatjara–Warlpiri musician who formed the Warumpi Band.

== Biography ==
Butcher was born at Papunya, Northern Territory in Central Australia.

His mother's side is from the south, the Pitjantjatjara tribe and his father's side from the Walpiri from Pikilyi, near Yinjirrimardi area.

He formed the Warumpi Band with George Burarrwanga, Neil Murray and Gordon Butcher in the late 1970s.

Butcher released a solo album Desert Surf Guitar on CAAMA music. The album's name was inspired by the sand hills surrounding Papunya, "you can imagine them as being huge red waves on the ocean" He was the subject of the documentary Sammy Butcher, Out of the Shadows, part of the Nganampa Anwernekenhe series. The documentary looks at his life after the Warumpi Band.

He is renowned as one of the best guitar players to come out of Central Australia. He now lives in Papunya, 250 kilometres (160 mi) west of Alice Springs.

In 2024 Butcher cowrote the musical Big name, No blankets with Andrea James and his daughter Anyupa Butcher. The musical is semi-autobiographical and told from the perspective of Butcher and his two younger brothers Gordon and Brian Butcher, which differs from other versions which tend to focus on another founding member Neil Murray. In the play Butcher is played by Baykali Ganambarr.

== Awards ==
=== National Indigenous Music Awards ===
The National Indigenous Music Awards recognise excellence, innovation and leadership among Aboriginal and Torres Strait Islander musicians from throughout Australia. They commenced in 2004.

Year	Nominee / work	Award	Result	Ref.
2023	Sammy Butcher	Hall of Fame	inducted	
