= Darwin Festival =

Annual arts festival in Darwin, Northern Territory of Australia

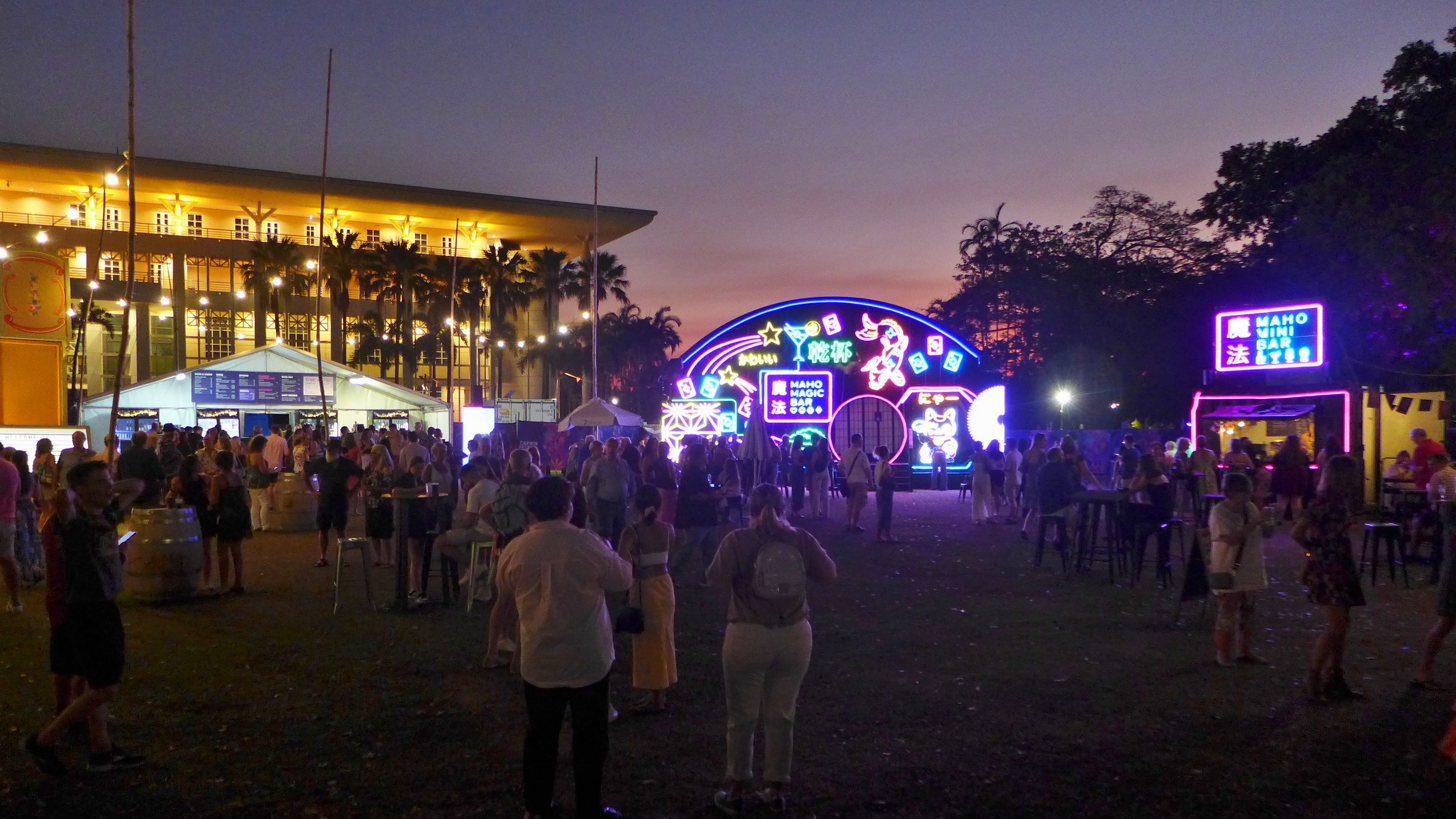
- The Festival space in 2023
- Status: Active
- Genre: Arts festival
- Frequency: Annually (every August)
- Location: Darwin, Northern Territory
- Country: Australia
- Years active: 46–47
- Inaugurated: 1979
- Most recent: 2025
- Website: Darwin Festival

The Darwin Festival, founded as the Bougainvillea Festival in 1979 and named Festival of Darwin from 1996 to 2002, is an annual arts festival in Darwin, Northern Territory. It celebrates the multicultural aspects of the Northern Territory lifestyle. The festival is held over 18 days in August and comprises a series of events including outdoor concerts, workshops, theatre, dance music, comedy, cabaret, film and visual arts. The Darwin Aboriginal Art Fair is held under the umbrella of the festival, and the Garma Festival, NATSIAA art awards, and National Indigenous Music Awards are within the festival period.

The next Darwin Festival is scheduled for 6-23 August 2026.

== History ==
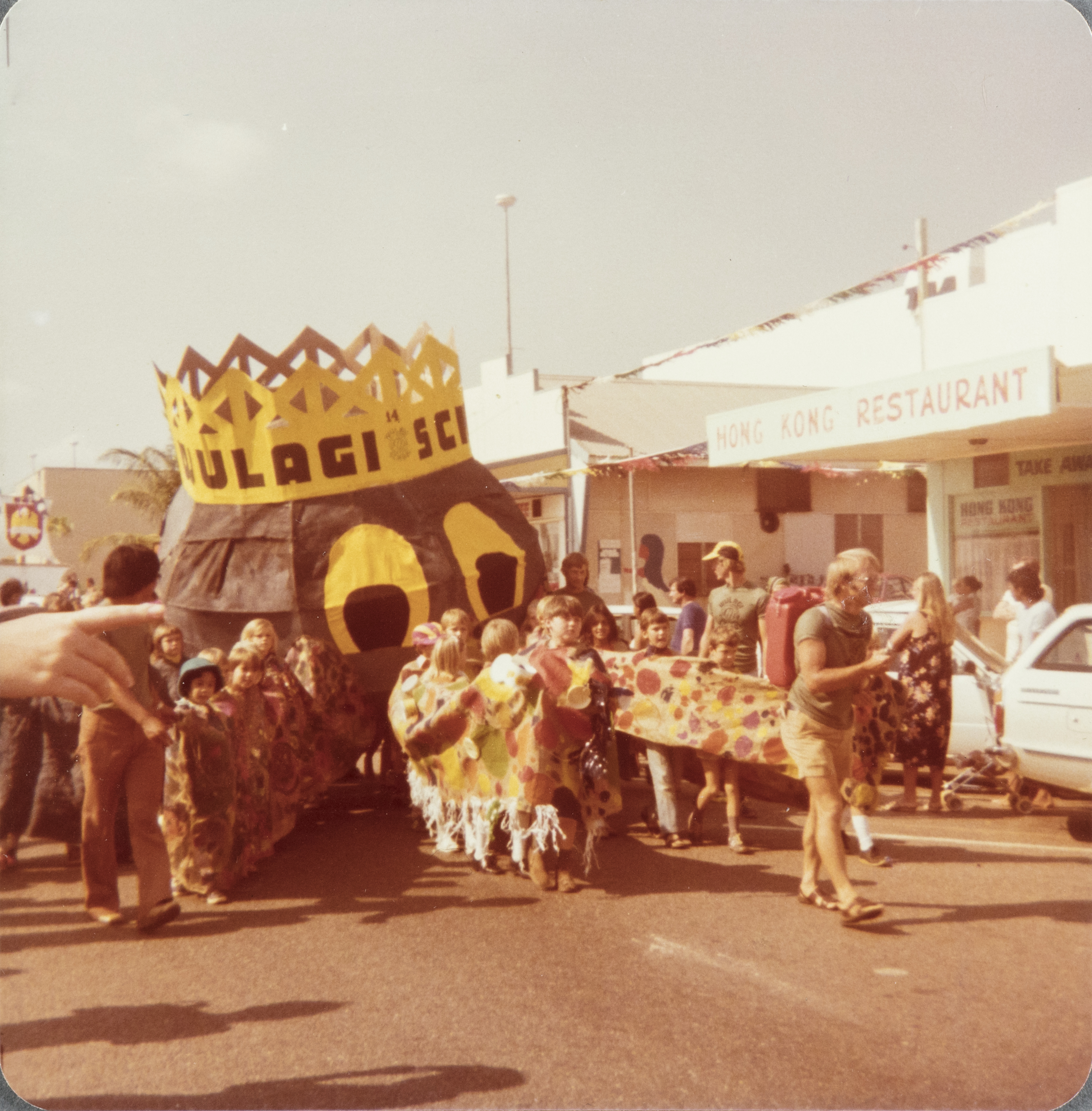
Wulagi Primary School float in the first Bougainvillea Festival in 1979.

=== 19th century ===
Darwin has a tradition of street parades and festival events dating back to early European settlement, following the issuing of Letters Patent annexing the Northern Territory to South Australia, 1863. The Township of Palmerston (as Darwin was then named) was surveyed by the South Australian Surveyor General GW Goyder in 1869 and by 1888 the non-Indigenous population of the Northern Territory consisted of around 1,200 Europeans and 6,000 Chinese people. Chinese New Year processions organised by the Chinese storekeepers, market gardeners and coolies who settled in Palmerston after the gold rushes of the 1870s were hugely popular.

=== 1900s–1940s ===
Palmerston was renamed Darwin following the Commonwealth takeover of the Northern Territory in 1911. By this time, largely through the restrictions of the White Australia Policy, Darwin's Asian population was in decline and amid growing civil unrest, trade union- organised marches gained in popularity. The Eight Hour Day Movement demonstration processions, popular in the early 1900s, were followed by Labour Day and May Day Marches held by the Darwin Workers' Club between 1919 and the late 1930s. Despite the restrictive immigration policy the Chinese community remained active in the social life of the town and formed the Darwin Chinese Recreation Club in December 1923 to take on all comers in the sports of boxing, Australian rules football, tennis, swimming and soccer. A small number of Italian migrants from Patagonia, Argentina, landed at Port Darwin in 1914 and found employment at Vestey's Meatworks.

Following the attacks on Pearl Harbor in December 1941, the civilian population of Darwin was ordered to be evacuated and Darwin and the surrounding area was placed under military control following a bombing raid by the Japanese Air Force on 19 February 1942. The township was extensively damaged during a subsequent series of air raids on Australia by the Japanese Air Force between February 1942 and November 1943. During this time, Darwin was a garrison town under the control of the Department of the Army, who spared no effort to improve recreational and entertainment facilities for troops based in Darwin.

At the end of the Second World War, Darwin reverted to civil control, with many of the evacuated administrative staff and the civilian population returning early in 1946. The departure of most of the armed services from the Northern Territory left little in the way of public entertainment facilities and following a public meeting the Darwin Workers' Club was re-established. A combined Stadium, Concert Hall and Meeting Place opened on 31 May 1946 with money subscribed and lent by its members and a series of concerts, fund raisers and boxing tournaments were staged at the Stadium after its completion in December 1946. The civilian population of the Northern Territory was increasing steadily and the 1947 census return recorded a population of 2,538 people inside the Darwin Town boundary. May Day celebrations resumed in 1947, with a monster sports programme and a street procession led by Qantas staff. A large group of Aboriginal men who joined the march won the prize for the best parade. Although much of China Town had been dismantled, a small number of Chinese people returned to Darwin after the war, re-establishing their businesses and building new homes in the outlying suburbs.

=== 1950s–1980s ===
Chinese New Year celebrations resumed in 1950 and in 1953 the Darwin Chinese Recreation Club reformed and participated in a street procession as part of the Coronation Week Celebration in Darwin.

An annual grant to assist Australian cultural organisations was instituted by the Commonwealth Government in 1952 and the sum of 1 000 pounds was distributed through five organisations in the Northern Territory, thereby enabling small festival type events. By 1964 Commonwealth government funding for cultural events was available to local organisations through a funding committee attached to the Northern Territory Administration Department of Welfare. Initial applications were made to the Regional Grants Committee in each local centre and passed on to the Administrator or to the Minister for final approval. In 1964/65 the first of these grants for the staging of exhibitions and events was received by the City of Darwin Festival Committee; the North Australian Eisteddfod Council; and the Centralian Arts Society. This led to the staging of the first City of Darwin Festival in 1964. In addition to the North Australia Eisteddfod, an exhibition of Aboriginal bark paintings was staged by the local (Darwin) Arts Council.

The Arts Council of the Northern Territory formed from a public meeting held in 1968 and affiliated with the newly formed Australian Council for the Arts, thereby enabling the Territory body to give greater opportunities to local artists and stage performances from visiting international artists. For the next 10 years, the festival featured sporting and cultural events that increasingly reflected the 'ocker' image of many Darwin residents, culminating in a beer drinking competition and the staging of the first Beer Can Regatta in 1974. The festivities were temporarily halted by the evacuation of Darwin following Cyclone Tracy, which devastated the city and its northern suburbs on Christmas Day 1974. Following the evacuation of Darwin and a short intense period of reconstruction, by late 1977, plans were under way for a Back to Darwin Event to be held in May 1978.

The modern festival evolved from the Bougainvillea Festival staged in 1979 to celebrate the first year of Northern Territory self-government. During the 1980s the festival featured floral processions, sporting events and a Mardi Gras concert.

=== 1990s–2000s ===
By the 1990s, the focus of the festival shifted to include community arts and aspects of Darwin's multiculturalism. The event was renamed the Festival of Darwin in 1996 and later renamed Darwin Festival in 2003 to reflect its growing international status.

In October 2022, gas company Santos announced that it would no longer finance the festival, after nearly 30 years of sponsorship. Climate change activists had been lobbying to end the association, more so since the controversial planned Barossa gas field off the territory's coast. The board had arranged alternative sponsorship.

== Description ==
The festival is usually held over 18 days and nights, and includes local and touring performances and events. There are outdoor concerts, workshops, theatre, cabaret acts, comedians, film and other performing and visual arts on show.

In 2026, Darwin Festival is scheduled to run from 6 to 23 August.

== Associated events ==
The National Indigenous Music Awards (NIMA) and Garma Festival are held in the same period as the Darwin Festival.

=== Darwin Aboriginal Art Fair ===
The Darwin Aboriginal Art Fair (DAAF) began as a complement to the National Aboriginal and Torres Strait Islander Art Awards (NATSIAA), which began in 1984.

The event now takes place as part of the Darwin Festival. The work of both emerging and established artists is showcased at the fair, which enables arts industry buyers, as well as art loves, to buy art directly from art centres which are owned and operated by Aboriginal and Torres Strait Islander people.

The 16th edition of the art fair was held from 5 to 7 August in 2022 in the Darwin Convention Centre, after two years of having been held online due to the COVID-19 pandemic. There were 78 art centres represented at the event.

The 17th official art fair ran from 11 to 13 August in 2023, with other events starting before the 11th, including the Indigenous Fashion Projects‘ Country to Couture runway and the National Indigenous Fashion Awards.

The next edition of DAAF will take place in August 2026, and offer both online and in person ways to attend.
