= Christine Anu discography =

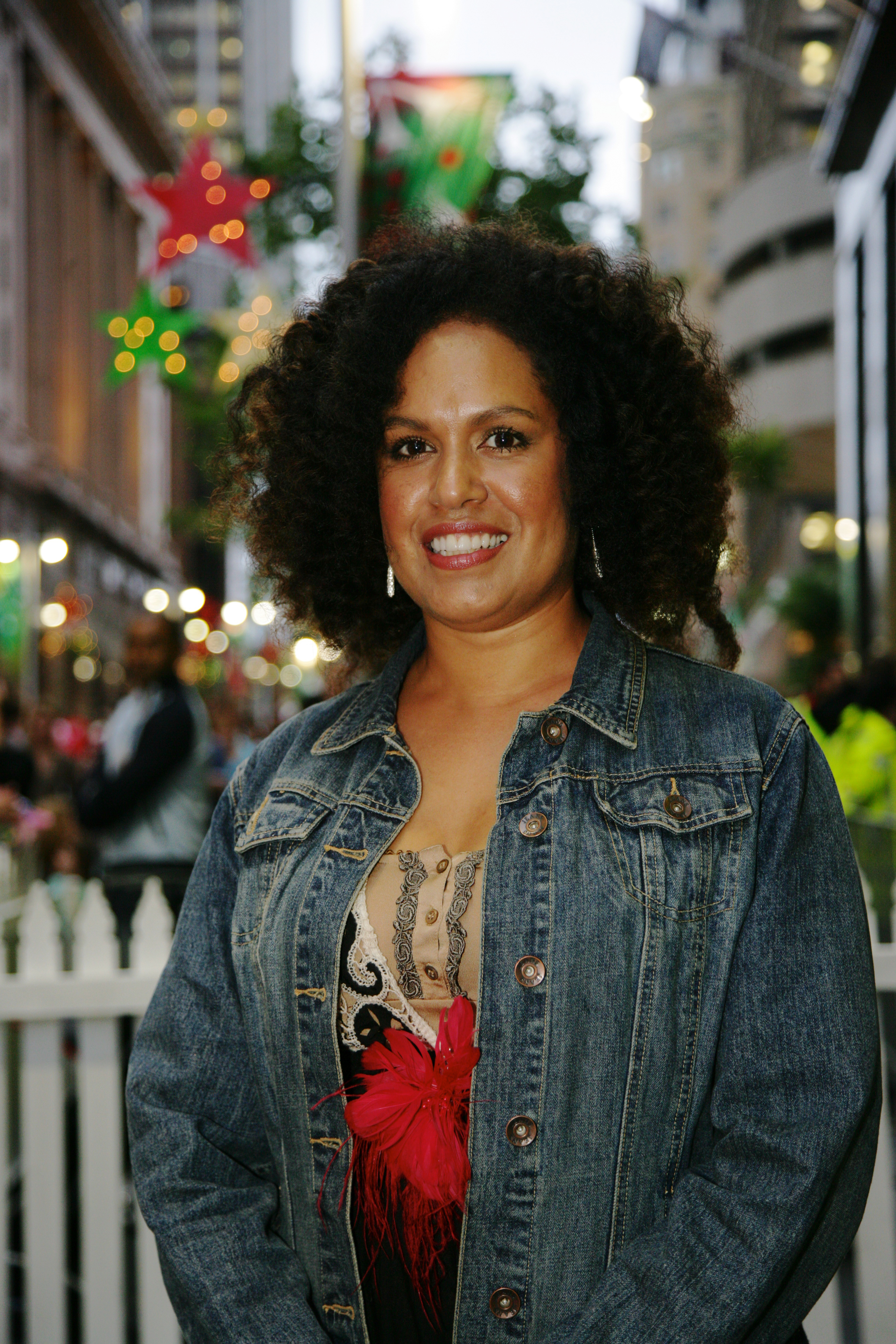
- Christine Anu in 2007
- Studio albums: 8
- EPs: 1
- Live albums: 3
- Singles: 22

The discography Christine Anu, an Australian singer-songwriter and actress consists of 8 studio albums, 1 extended play (EP), 3 live albums, and 22 singles. Anu's albums range in genre from pop and pop rock, to acoustic, children's, Christmas, live and tribute albums.

== Albums ==
=== Studio albums ===
List of studio albums, with selected chart positions, sales figures and certifications.
Title	Details	Chart positions	Certifications (sales thresholds)
Title	Details	AUS	Certifications (sales thresholds)
Stylin' Up	Released: 1 May 1995; Label: Mushroom (D 24345); Format: CD, cassette	21	ARIA: Platinum
Come My Way	Released: 11 September 2000; Label: Mushroom (MUSH332872); Format: CD	18	ARIA: Gold
45 Degrees	Released: 10 November 2003; Label: Mushroom (337472); Format: CD, digital	—	
Acoustically	Acoustic album (part of Liberation Blue series); Released: 14 November 2005; Label: Liberation Blue (BLUE083.2); Format: CD, digital download	—	
Chrissy's Island Family	Children's album; Released: 4 July 2007; Format: CD, digital download	—	
Rewind: The Aretha Franklin Songbook	Released: 3 August 2012; Label: Christine Anu (ANU001); Format: CD, digital download	—	
Island Christmas	Released: 7 November 2014; Label: Social Family Records (SFR0023); Format: CD, digital download	146	
Waku: Minaral a Minalay	Released: 2 August 2024; Label: Christine Anu, ABC Music; Format: CD, LP, digital download	—	
"—" denotes a recording that did not chart or was not released in that territory.

=== Live albums ===
Title	Details	Chart positions
Title	Details	AUS
Intimate and Deadly	Released: 2005; Label: Showtune Records (CD0001); Format: CD, digital download	—
Takin' It to the Streets (with Deni Hines)	Live DVD + CD; Label: MGM Distribution (HAIRITAGE2); Released: 2008	—
ReStylin' Up 20 Years	Live re-recorded album of Stylin' Up; Released: 19 June 2016; Label: Social Family Records (SFR0034); Format: CD, digital download	149
"—" denotes a recording that did not chart or was not released in that territory.

== Extended plays ==
Title	Details	Notes
Gimme 5	Label: Warner Music Australia; Format: Digital	Five-track compilation of Anu's biggest hits.

== Singles ==
List of singles, with selected chart positions showing year released and originating album.
Title	Year	Chart positions	Album
Title	Year	AUS	Album
"Last Train" (with Paul Kelly)	1993	93	Non-album single
"Monkey & the Turtle"	1994	—	Stylin' Up
"Island Home"	1995	67	Stylin' Up
"Party"	1995	20	Stylin' Up
"Come On"	1995	94	Stylin' Up
"Now Until the Break of Day" (Baz Luhrmann featuring Christine Anu, David Hobson with Royce Doherty)	1997	50	Something for Everybody
"Sunshine on a Rainy Day"	2000	26	Come My Way
"Jump to Love"	2000	58	Come My Way
"Jump to Love" (reissue) / "Island Home (Earth Beat)"	2000	—	Come My Way
"'Coz I'm Free"	2001	86	Come My Way
"Talk About Love?"	2003	85	45 Degrees
"Chrissy's Island Family"	2007	—	Chrissy's Island Family
"Takin' It to the Streets" (with Deni Hines)	2008	—	Takin' It to the Streets
"Come Home"	2010	—	Non-album singles
"Beat of Your Heart"	2014	—	Non-album singles
"Proud" (with Jason Owen)	2016	—	Proud (Jason Owen album)
"Without You" (with Greg Gould)	2018	—	Non-album singles
"Heal Together" (with Philly, Mindy Kwanten & Radical Son)	2019	—	Non-album singles
"Kulba Yaday" (with Chris Tamwoy)	2020	—	Non-album singles
"Doo Wop (That Thing)" (Triple J – Like a Version; with Ziggy Ramo)	2023	—	Non-album singles
"Waku: Minaral a Minalay"	2024	—	Waku: Minaral a Minalay
"Piki Lullaby"	2025	—	Non-album single
"Lil' Obsession" (Triple J – Like a Version)	2026	—	Non-album single
"—" denotes a recording that did not chart or was not released in that territory.

=== Other singles ===
Title	Year	Notes
"Yil Lull" (Singers for Red, Black and Gold)	1998	Singers for Red, Black and Gold was made up of Archie Roach, Paul Kelly, Christine Anu, Judith Durham, Renee Geyer, Kutcha Edwards and Tiddas.
