= MC Opi =

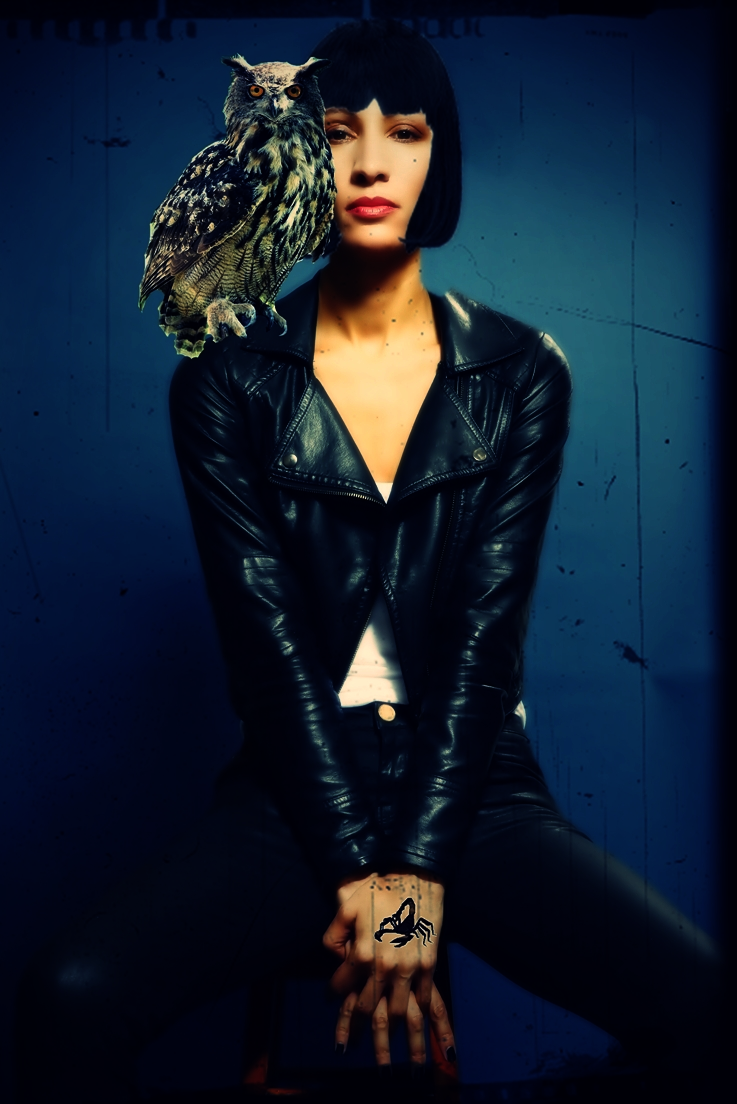
- MC Opi

Background information
- Born: Janette Oparebea Nelson; 10 April 1971 (age 55); Chelsea, London, United Kingdom
- Genres: dancehall, industrial, dub, trip hop, deep house, progressive house, electronica, electroacoustic, experimental, dark ambient, circuit bending
- Instruments: Bass guitar, drums, piano, celtic harp
- Years active: 1987–present
- Labels: Mushroom Australia, EMI, PolyGram, Warner Bros. Records, Phonogram, Wintrup Musikverlage
- Website: Opi Nelson

Janette Oparebea Nelson (born 10 April 1971), known by her stage names MC Opi and Opi Nelson is a multi-instrumentalist, spoken word artist, music and documentary producer.

The Monthly, Australia's popular magazine of politics, society and culture, wrote Nelson "blazed a trail as a producer and guest artist...".

She is most known for being the first female music artist to receive national recognition in Australia for a Dancehall performance as a guest artist on the Christine Anu (ARIA award-winning Australian indigenous singer and songwriter) and Paul Kelly (a prolific ARIA Award-winning Australian folk singer and songwriter), 1994 ARIA nominated, single, "Last Train". Later she was both a writer and guest performer on Anu's award-winning 1995 ARIA Best Indigenous Release, ARIA Platinum Album and voted one of the 50 Best Debut Albums by the Australian Broadcasting Corporation's Double J Radio Station in September 2020 Stylin Up.

Nelson was a well known local Sydney live independent spoken word artist and producer before she met Christine Anu, whilst acting in a cast of eight, alongside Christine Anu and Barry Otto (AFI Awarded Australian actor), in the 1993 musical theatrical production The Trials of Brother Jero written by Nigerian Nobel Prize playwright Wole Soyinka.

Before "Last Train's" success in 1994, she was known for her work in Australian dance music TV and radio. She was one of the first music artists to be a reporter and assistant producer on the first Australian dance music show SBS TV's 'MC Tee Vee' and Alternative Arts Show 'The Noise' (produced by one of Australia's prolific TV producers, Annette Shun Wah). Her MC Tee Vee interviews included The Beastie Boys, Lucky Dube and others.

At the age of 19 years, she co-produced, with Jaslyn Hall Australian Broadcasting Corporation Triple J and Womadelaide Producer, the 1991 Australian Broadcasting Corporation radio documentary 'Women on the Rhyme' the first ABC radio documentary about Australian and International female dancehall and hip hop artists. 'Women on the Rhyme' featured interviews with Charlene (Def Wish Cast), No.1 Jamaican & US female Dancehall artist Shelly Thunder, New Zealand Hip Hop Group Moana and the Moahunters and Sydney Hip Hop Artist Rap Attack and others.

== Early life and family ==
Nelson was born in Chelsea, London, United Kingdom and her heritage is Irish, Australian Indigenous and Ghanaian.

Nelson's niece is Ghanaian British 'MZ Porsche', a female Hip Hop artist who has achieved national recognition and like Nelson, she is a multi-instrumentalist.

== Collaborations ==
Late 1993 Nelson was spotted by internationally acclaimed Australian indigenous artist, filmmaker and photographer Tracey Moffatt. Moffatt invited her to be an assistant director and have a cameo role alongside the late INXS lead singer Michael Hutchence in the notorious parody INXS "The Messenger" video, a song on INXS's Full Moon, Dirty Hearts album.

In the same year, Nelson also collaborated with David Thrussell (SNOG, and Black Lung) an Australian musician and a prolific composer, Russell Kilbey (The Crystal Set) and Dare Mason(a producer and composer who has worked with internationally notable bands The Church, Placebo and Kraftwerk) on the progressive house and industrial dance mini EP 'Get Lost' Sex Industrie, Polygram Australia.

In 1994 following her guest performance on Christine Anu's debut single "Last Train" the previous year, Nelson collaborated further on Anu's debut Album Stylin Up.

== 2000 to Present ==
2000 produced her solo industrial dark wave project Jezebel Complex which Australian Broadcasting Corporation Producer Tim Ritchie played on the ABC National Radio show 'Sound Quality'.
2008 produced her solo project 'The Black Hole Lovers'.
2009 she studied the Masters of Digital Media at The College of Fine Arts, The University of New South Wales in Australia obtaining distinctions in the subject 'Sound Construction and Design.'
2012 to 2013 returned to London and continued to work on her independent solo music project 'The Black Hole Lovers' whilst working at The University of Cambridge and Oxford University.
2014 returned to one of her former occupations TV production, with her side project DotsWaves TV a web TV show which showcases Noise, Industrial Music and Digital Hybrid artists around the globe.
