= David Hobson =

David Hobson may refer to:

- Dave Hobson (1936–2024), American politician of the Republican party
- David Hobson (tenor) (born 1960), Australian opera / musical singer
