= Crow Coyote Buffalo =

Studio album by Mama
- Released: November 2008
- Recorded: 2008
- Genre: Folk
- Length: 38 minutes
- Label: Fly Like a Sprite Records
- Producer: Martin Stansbury

Crow Coyote Buffalo is an album recorded by Sarah McQuaid and Zoë Pollock under the band name Mama. It consists of ten songs co-written by the pair plus a re-working of Pollock's 1991 hit single "Sunshine on a Rainy Day".

== Track listing ==
1. "The Fool of Spring" - (Z.Pollock and S.McQuaid) (2:11)
2. "Crow Coyote Buffalo" - (Z.Pollock and S.McQuaid) (3:34)
3. "Kathakali Boy" - (Z.Pollock and S.McQuaid) (3:14)
4. "Liquid Sunshine" - (Z.Pollock and S.McQuaid) (2:53)
5. "Western" - (Z.Pollock and S.McQuaid) (5:44)
6. "Aquí Me Pinté Yo (for Frida Kahlo)" - (Z.Pollock and S.McQuaid) (2:50)
7. "Dancing Girl" - (Z.Pollock and S.McQuaid) (3:27)
8. "The Lovers (For Pamela Colman Smith)" - (Z.Pollock and S.McQuaid) (3:49)
9. "Pipe and Tabor" - (Z.Pollock and S.McQuaid) (3:07)
10. "At the Waterside" - (Z.Pollock and S.McQuaid) (3:20)
11. "Sunshine on a Rainy Day 2008" - (Z.Pollock and M.Glover) (3:58)

== Personnel ==
- Zoë Pollock - vocals, ukulele, classical guitar
- Sarah McQuaid - vocals, steel-string guitar, Nord Electro keyboard
- Andy Jarvis - percussion, drum kit, accordion, trumpet, harmonium
- Tiffany Bryant - flute

== Production ==
- Produced and engineered by Martin Stansbury
- Recorded and mixed at various locations in West Cornwall
- Mastered by Sander van der Heide at Polyhymnia International, Baarn, The Netherlands
- Booklet design by Sarah Turner
- Original cover artwork by Feargal Shiels
- Photographs of Zoë and Sarah by Murray Lachlan Young
- Other photography by Sarah Turner
