= Talk About Love =

Talk About Love may refer to:

- "Talk About Love" (Christine Anu song), 2003
- "Talk About Love" (Zara Larsson song), 2020
- "Talk About Love", a 2024 song by Kate Hudson
