= Sarah McQuaid =

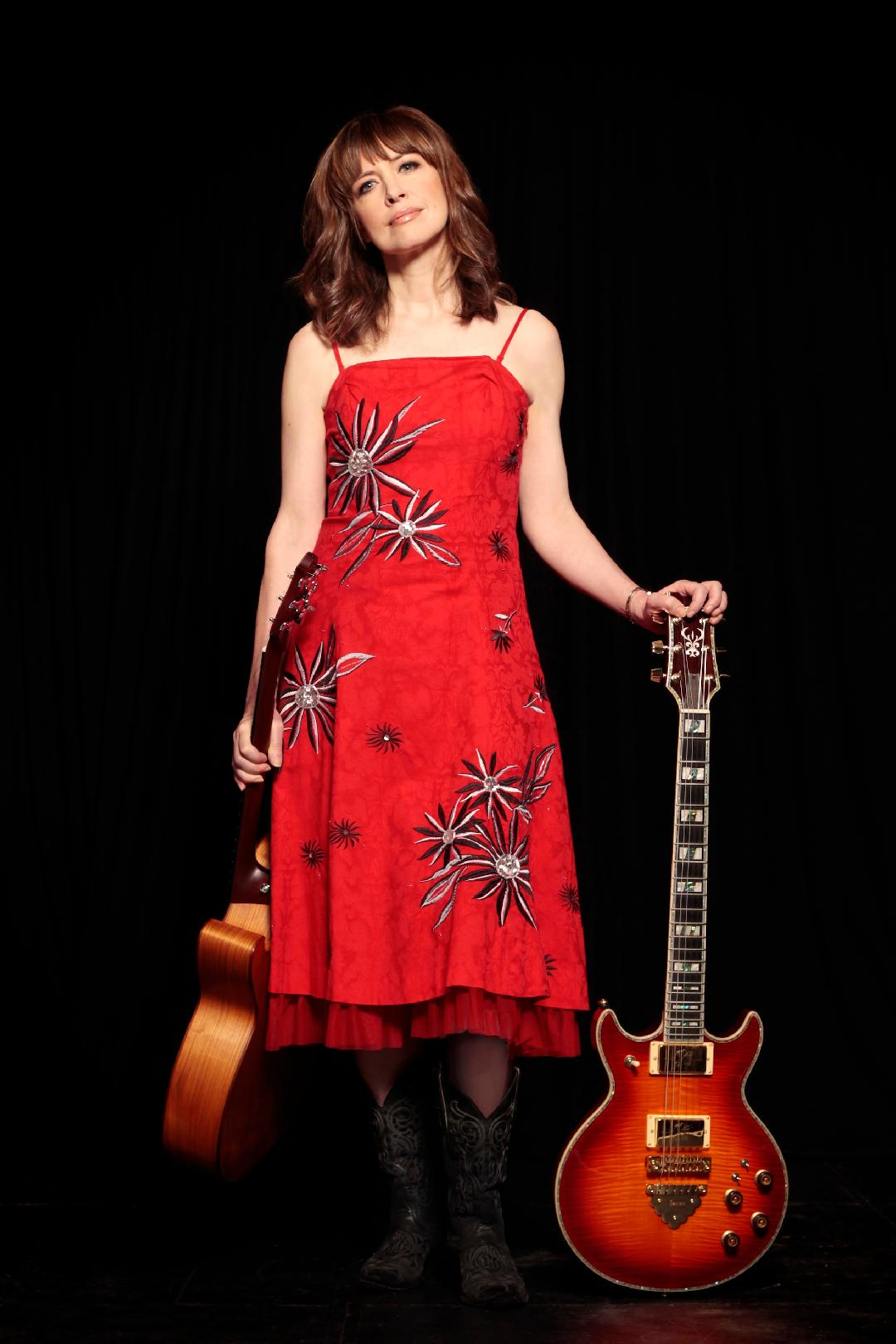
- McQuaid with two guitars

Background information
- Born: May 19, 1966 (age 59); Madrid, Spain
- Genres: Singer-songwriter; folk; Americana; roots
- Occupations: Musician; singer-songwriter
- Instruments: Vocals; acoustic guitar; electric guitar; keyboards; piano; percussion
- Years active: 1997–present
- Labels: Waterbug; Shovel; Spade
- Website: sarahmcquaid.com

Sarah McQuaid is a singer-songwriter, composer and multi-instrumentalist. She has recorded seven solo albums: When Two Lovers Meet (self-released, 1997), I Won't Go Home ’Til Morning (self-released, 2008), The Plum Tree And The Rose (Waterbug Records, 2012), Walking into White (Waterbug Records, 2015), If We Dig Any Deeper It Could Get Dangerous (Shovel and a Spade Records, 2018), The St Buryan Sessions (Shovel and a Spade Records, 2021) and Walking into White Live in Rapid City (self-released on Bandcamp, 2025). Three songs on McQuaid's Walking into White album were inspired by the Swallows and Amazons books by English author Arthur Ransome. After recording her first three albums in Ireland with producer Gerry O'Beirne (Sharon Shannon), McQuaid enlisted her cousin, Adam Pierce (Mice Parade) to serve as producer for Walking into White. Her fifth album, If We Dig Any Deeper It Could Get Dangerous, was produced by veteran English guitarist and singer-songwriter, Michael Chapman. Under the band name Mama, she and Zoë Pollock (writer and performer of hit single "Sunshine on a Rainy Day") recorded Crow Coyote Buffalo (2008), an album of songs co-written by the pair. McQuaid has also guested on albums by Clodagh Simonds, Wendy Arrowsmith, Colin Harper and the Cafe Orchestra amongst others.

McQuaid's work has been likened to classic 1970s British folk singers such as Sandy Denny and Nick Drake, and her diverse work has also explored three-part round singing (with Niamh Parsons and Tom Barry). All of McQuaid's albums are distributed in the U.K. by Proper Music Distribution. She is one of several artists who have covered Ewan MacColl's "The First Time Ever I Saw Your Face," which appears on McQuaid's Walking into White album (2015).

In January 2021, McQuaid began releasing a series of singles and videos entitled The St Buryan Sessions, recorded and filmed live in July 2020 in the church of St Buryan, Cornwall. The full collection was released on 15 October 2021 as an album and as a concert film.

In May 2025 McQuaid released a live version of her Walking Into White album which had been recorded in 2015 at a concert performance in Rapid City Public Library in South Dakota, captured at the request of South Dakota Public Radio and broadcast on their No Cover, No Minimum series.

== Biography ==
Born in Spain to American art critic Jane Addams Allen (founder and editor of the New Art Examiner) and Spanish artist José Paredes Jardiel, McQuaid grew up in the USA, lived for 13 years in Ireland and now resides in Cornwall, England. McQuaid's great-great-great aunt, prominent pacifist and activist for women's suffrage Jane Addams, won the Nobel Peace Prize for her work in the settlement house movement. McQuaid is married to artist Feargal Shiels and they have two children.

== Discography ==
=== Albums ===
- When Two Lovers Meet (released 1 February 1997)
- I Won't Go Home 'Til Morning (released 28 October 2008)
- Crow Coyote Buffalo (released 24 November 2008) (As Mama with Zoë Pollock)
- The Plum Tree and the Rose (released 5 March 2012)
- Walking Into White (released 2 February 2015)
- If We Dig Any Deeper It Could Get Dangerous (released 2 February 2018)
- The St Buryan Sessions (released 15 October 2021)
- Walking Into White Live In Rapid City (released 2 May 2025)

=== Singles ===
- "The Silver Lining" (3-track single) (3 November 2014)
- "The Sun Goes On Rising" (3-track single) (5 February 2012)
- "The Silence Above Us (The St Buryan Sessions)" (29 January 2021)

== Bibliography ==
McQuaid is the author of The Irish DADGAD Guitar Book (Ossian Publications/Music Sales Ltd, 1995).
