= ReStylin' Up 20 Years =

Live album by Christine Anu
- Released: 19 June 2015
- Studio: Studios 301, Sydney
- Genre: Jazz; soul; pop
- Label: Social Family
- Producer: Steve Balbi

Christine Anu chronology
Island Christmas (2014)	ReStylin' Up 20 Years (2015)	Waku: Minaral a Minalay (2024)

ReStylin' Up 20 Years is a live album recorded by Australian singer Christine Anu. it is a live recording of her 1995 debut album Stylin' Up in celebration of its 20th anniversary. The album was recorded in one day and released on 19 June 2015. The tracks are recorded in a jazz/soul genre.

In an interview with The Canberra Times, Anu said: "For some of the songs it was hard for me to grasp the idea that they should even be made to sound different. It's not everyone's thing. People are going to listen to that and go 'Why did she mess with that tune'. But I feel that the integrity of the song is still there. All it's done is it's trying on some new clothes."

Produce Steve Balbi said he was keen to work with Anu again, calling her an "incredible artist" and saying "I put her right up there with Aretha Franklin." Anu toured the album across Australia from July to October 2015.

== Track listing ==
All songs composed by Christine Anu and David Bridie except where noted.

1. "Wanem Time" (Neil Murray) – 2:49
2. "Island Home" (Murray) – 4:12
3. "San E Wireless" – (Anu, Nelson) 3:32
4. "Monkey and the Turtle" – 3:59
5. "Come On" – 3:37
6. "Party" – 3:14
7. "Tama Oma" – 2:04
8. "Dive" – 4:07
9. "Photograph" – 3:52
10. "Sik O" (Bridie, Traditional) – 3:12
11. "Kulba Yaday" – 3:43

== Charts ==
Chart performance for ReStylin' Up 20 Years
Chart (2015)	Peak position
Australian Albums (ARIA)	149

== Release history ==
Country	Date	Format	Label	Catalogue
Australia	19 June 2015	CD, digital download	Social Family	SFR0034
