= Heaven (Jason Rowe album) =

- Standard release album cover

Studio album by Jai (Jason Rowe)
- Released: 11 November 1997
- Recorded: Honey B Studios, London, UK
- Genre: Sophisti-pop, rock, trip hop, soul
- Length: 48:48
- Label: M&G (UK), RCA (USA)
- Producer: Joel Bogen

Jai (Jason Rowe) chronology
Heaven (1997)	Lovelife (2006)

European release album cover

Singles from Heaven
- 1. "Don't Give Me Away" Released: 17 February 1997; 2. "I Believe" Released: 5 May 1997; 3. "Heaven" Released: 11 August 1997; 4. "Wishing the Rain Away" Released: 8 September 1997 (Japan)

Heaven is the debut album of British neo soul singer Jason Rowe, performing under the name Jai. The album was released on 11 November 1997. While well-reviewed, it would be Rowe's only album for nearly ten years, with Rowe later releasing his second album, Lovelife, under his full name in February 2007.

The album includes covers of the Arthur Hamilton standard "Cry Me a River", as well as "Magnolia", an early song of J. J. Cale's. "I Believe", which was a moderate hit in the United States, was included in a special song collection compact disc sold around the same time by fashion retailer Banana Republic. A music video directed by Paul Boyd for "I Believe" aired successively on The Box, VH1, and MuchMusic from August 1997 through February 1998.

There are two versions of the album, the alternate having been released in Europe. The cover art is virtually the same for both; in the European release, Jai's face is positioned at the center and occupies the entire frame, and his name and the album's title appear in the lower-left corner with the title both reduced in size and superimposed over his name. More significantly, alternate takes of the songs "Heaven" and "Wishing the Rain Away" appear on these different versions.

== Critical reception ==
Professional ratings
Review scores
Source	Rating
Allmusic	4/5 stars
Entertainment Weekly	B
Los Angeles Times	(favorable)
New York Daily News	(favorable)
People	(favorable)
The Washington Post	(favorable)

The Allmusic review by Stephen Thomas Erlewine awarded the album four out of five stars, describing it as "a stylish amalgam of jazzy sophisti-pop, Motown, swinging '60s rock, trip hop and contemporary soul. While the songwriting in Heaven is uneven, Jai's voice is consistently thrilling, soaring to new soulful heights. That voice – along with songs that show how powerful his updated blue-eyed soul can be, like "I Believe" and "Don't Give Me Away" — is what makes Heaven such a promising and successful debut."

== Track listing ==
No.	Title	Writer(s)	Length
1.	"I Believe"	Jason Rowe, Joel Bogen, Christopher Bemand	4:51
2.	"I Need Love"	Rowe, Bogen	4:09
3.	"Let Me In"	Rowe, Bogen	3:43
4.	"Cry Me a River"	Arthur Hamilton	3:45
5.	"Wishing the Rain Away"	Rowe, Bogen	4:47
6.	"Don't Give Me Away"	Rowe, Bogen, Rob Watson	4:46
7.	"Heaven"	Rowe, Bogen, Bemand	4:03
8.	"You Split Me"	Rowe, Bogen, Watson	2:56
9.	"Magnolia"	J. J. Cale	3:48
10.	"Something on Your Mind"	Rowe, Bogen	3:37
11.	"Open"	Rowe, Bogen	4:36
12.	"I Believe (Acoustic Reprise)"	Rowe, Bogen, Bemand	3:51

== Credits ==
=== Personnel ===
- Jai (Jason Rowe) – lead and backing vocals
- Christopher Bemand – keyboards
- Joel Bogen – guitar, keyboards
- Andy Duncan – percussion ("Heaven")
- The Electra Strings – strings ("Don't Give Me Away" and "Wishing the Rain Away")
- Pete Giordino – Hammond organ ("Heaven")
- Preston Heyman – percussion
- Paul Hirsch – Hammond organ
- Honey – barking ("Open")
- Larry Fifield – additional backing vocals
- Claudia Fontaine – backing vocals
- Tony Ford – backing vocals
- John Miller – additional drums ("Magnolia")
- Olivia – small child ("Don't Give Me Away")
- Chuck Sabo – drums
- Jason Silver – piano and Rhodes piano ("Magnolia"); additional backing vocals
- Phil Spalding – bass

=== Production ===
- Christopher Bemand – programming
- Joel Bogen – producer, programming
- Paul Boswell – agent
- Andy Duncan – additional programming ("Heaven")
- Steve Fitzmaurice – mixing
- Dave Novik – A&R
- Dick O'Dell – management
- Chris Porter – additional production and mixing ("Heaven")
- Stylorouge – design
- Norman Watson – cover photograph
- Rob Watson – additional programming ("Don't Give Me Away" and "You Split Me")
- Tim Young – mastering (Metropolis, UK)
- Leon Zervos – mastering (Absolute Audio, USA)

== Charts ==
A couple of months following its release, Heaven made a brief appearance on the Billboard Heatseekers Album Chart during the week of 31 January 1998, where it ranked at number 49.

Single	Chart	Peak position	Date
"Don't Give Me Away"	UK Singles Chart	200	1 March 1997
"I Believe"	UK Singles Chart	148	5 May 1997
"Heaven"	UK Singles Chart	184	30 August 1997
"Wishing the Rain Away"	Tokio Hot 100	15	21 September 1997
