= 'Coz I'm Free =

2001 song performed by Christine Anu

- CD single cover

Single by Christine Anu

from the album Come My Way
- A-side: 'Coz I'm Free
- Released: April 2001
- Recorded: Megaphon Studios, Sydney, 2000
- Genre: Pop
- Length: 3:56
- Label: Mushroom
- Songwriters: Christine Anu, Stuart Crichton, Andy White
- Producer: Stuart Crichton

Christine Anu singles chronology
"Jump to Love" / "Island Home (Earth Beat)" (2000)	"'Coz I'm Free" (2001)	"Talk About Love?" (2003)

Music video
- "'Coz I'm Free" on YouTube

"'Coz I'm Free" is a song recorded by Christine Anu. It was released in April 2001 as the third and final single from her gold-selling, second studio album, Come My Way (2000). The song is inspired by Anu's hero Cathy Freeman. At a Mushroom Records press release, Anu said; "I met Cathy at the ARIA Music Awards a couple of years ago but it wasn't until I saw her in Seville... that 'Coz I'm Free" came together. I watched her win the World Championships and then we caught up in London not long afterwards.... She's so inspiring—her focus, how hard she trains, all that she's achieved. When I watched the race in Seville, the camera zoomed in on her tattoo and I got the idea then for a song." The song peaked at number 86 on the ARIA Chart.

== Track listings ==
CD Single (MUSH020132)

1. "'Coz I'm Free"
2. "'Coz I'm Free" (Illpickl's Other World Mix)
3. "Jump to Love" (Course & Morrison Mix (Edit))

== Chart positions ==
Chart (2000/01)	Peak position
Australia (ARIA)	86
Australian artist Chart (ARIA)	13
