= 45 Degrees =

Studio album by Christine Anu
- Released: 10 November 2003
- Recorded: 2003
- Studio: Sing Sing Studios
- Genre: Pop rock, dance-pop, R&B
- Length: 41:53
- Label: Festival Mushroom
- Producer: Jarrad Rogers

Christine Anu chronology
Come My Way (2000)	45 Degrees (2003)	Acoustically (2005)

Singles from 45 Degrees
- 1. "Talk About Love?" Released: 20 October 2003

45 Degrees is the third studio album by Torres Strait Islander singer Christine Anu.

Anu cites Melbourne-based producer Jarrad Rogers as the key catalyst to this musical re-awakening. Long runs with the stage show Kissing Frogs, and the birth of her second child Zipporah had left Christine a little hesitant about returning to the studio. "Basically, I wasn’t going to do another album until the right person was found," she states, "And I've been blessed. Our paths were meant to meet."

In an interview with Paul Cashmere in March 2004, Anu said the album was 'self indulgent' and "We let each song evolve and the strong ones stayed and the other ones have gone into a catalogue to be resurrected somewhere down the track".

== Critical reception ==
Ellaina Wigell from Music Wire complimented the "energy" and "different shades" to the album, stating: "this album presents a different side to Anu. It is diverse and stands apart from predecessors" adding, "Risk-taking however is fundamental to musical growth and it is encouraging to see Anu take chances."

Hector from HMV felt that listeners would be surprised, writing: "Christine Anu has taken one giant leap on her third album dishing up a dose of energetic funk and rock. "2 Late" slams in like Prince in his glory days, "LRHD" is rock meets dance but with a modern production sound, "Different Kind of Something" has R&B / jazz leanings and "Talk About Love" is another no nonsense rock track pushing her voice to the limit." Hector concluded with "Christine is a major Australian talent. 45 Degrees modernizes her sound".

== Track listing ==
No.	Title	Writer(s)	Length
1.	"Intro"	Christine Anu / Jared Haschek / Jarrad "Jaz" Rogers	1:04
2.	"2 Late"	Jarrad "Jaz" Rogers	2:58
3.	"LRHD (Love Rules, Hatred Dies)"	Christine Anu / Jarrad "Jaz" Rogers	3:38
4.	"Different Kind of Something"	Christine Anu / Jarrad "Jaz" Rogers	3:38
5.	"Talk About Love?"	Jarrad "Jaz" Rogers	3:28
6.	"45 Degrees"	Christine Anu / Jarrad "Jaz" Rogers	3:29
7.	"All My People Say"	Christine Anu / Jarrad "Jaz" Rogers	3:41
8.	"Don't Ya Know, (It's Over)"	Christine Anu / J. Cohen / Jarrad "Jaz" Rogers	3:52
9.	"Why"	Christine Anu / Jarrad "Jaz" Rogers	3:35
10.	"Hey! People"	Christine Anu / B. Chandler / Jarrad "Jaz" Rogers	3:30
11.	"Falling from Free"	Christine Anu / Jarrad "Jaz" Rogers	4:15
12.	"The End"	Jarrad "Jaz" Rogers	4:45
