= The Plum Tree and the Rose =

Studio album by Sarah McQuaid
- Released: March 2012
- Recorded: 2012
- Studio: Marguerite Studios, Dublin
- Genre: Folk
- Length: 47 minutes
- Label: Waterbug Records
- Producer: Gerry O'Beirne

Sarah McQuaid chronology
I Won't Go Home 'Til Morning (2008)	The Plum Tree and the Rose (2012)

The Plum Tree and the Rose is the third album by singer-songwriter Sarah McQuaid. It is a collection of traditional centuries-old material and original songs.

== Reception ==
Hot Press referred to the release as "an album that should feature on many end-of-year best-ofs." AllMusic's J. Poet commented about McQuaid's vocal on the album, stating it is "full of the tremulous emotion every parent feels".

== Track listing ==
1. Lift You Up and Let You Fly (S.McQuaid) - 3:10
2. Hardwick's Lofty Towers (S.McQuaid) - 3:43
3. Solid Air (J.Martyn) - 5:04
4. Kenilworth (S.McQuaid) - 3:03
5. In Derby Cathedral (S.McQuaid) - 5:03
6. The Sun Goes On Rising (Sarah McQuaid & Gerry O’Beirne)- 4:14
7. S’Anc Fuy Belha Ni Prezada (Cadenet, c. 1200, arr. Sarah McQuaid & Gerry O’Beirne) - 4:14
8. Can She Excuse My Wrongs (John Dowland, published in 1597 in The First Booke Of Songes, arr. S.McQuaid) - 4:25
9. New Oysters New(Thomas Ravenscroft, published in 1609 in Pammelia: Mvsicks Miscellanie, arr. S.McQuaid) - 1:00
10. So Much Rain (Sarah McQuaid & Gerry O’Beirne) - 4:10
11. What Are We Going to Do (Sarah McQuaid & Gerry O’Beirne) - 2:57
12. The Plum Tree and the Rose (S.McQuaid) - 4:29
13. In Gratitude I Sing (S.McQuaid) - 1:02

== Personnel ==
- Sarah McQuaid: vocals [1–13], guitar [1–6, 9–13], shruti box [7]
- Gerry O’Beirne: tiple [1, 7], 12-string guitar [1, 5], guitar [2], vocals [13]
- Rod McVey: keyboards [1–2, 5–7, 10–11]
- Trevor Hutchinson: double bass [1–2, 4–6, 10–11]
- Bill Blackmore: flugelhorn [1], trumpet [3, 5]
- Rosie Shipley: fiddle [2]
- Máire Breatnach: fiddle [2, 4]
- Liam Bradley: percussion [4–6, 11]
- Noel Eccles: percussion [4, 7]
- Niamh Parsons, Tom Barry: vocals [9, 13]
- Frances Hutchinson, Emer Ní Bhrádaigh: vocals [13]

=== Production ===
- Produced by Gerry O'Beirne
- Engineered by Trevor Hutchinson
- Recorded and mixed at Marguerite Studios, Glasnevin, Dublin
- Mastered by Sander van der Heide at Polyhymnia International, Baarn, The Netherlands
- Design and original cover artwork by Mary Guinan
- Photography by Colm Henry

=== Technical ===
- McQuaid plays:
  - a 1965 Martin D-28 [5,10]
  - her custom-made guitar by Andy Manson [1–4, 6–13]
- Both guitars are fitted with Fishman Matrix pickups
- John Pearse strings
- DADGAD tuning
