= Jason Rowe =

- Also known as: Jai
- Born: Jason Rowe; 31 December 1969 (age 56); Yeovil, Somerset, England
- Origin: London, UK
- Genres: Electronic, pop, soul
- Occupation: Singer-songwriter
- Instruments: Voice, acoustic guitar
- Years active: 1994–present
- Labels: M&G, RCA, Four Music
- Website: Jason Rowe at Myspace

Jason Rowe, who formerly recorded under the name Jai, is a British pop and soul singer currently residing in England.

== Life and career ==
Jason Rowe was born in Yeovil, England, in December 1969. He moved to London in the mid-1990s and began working with producer Joel Bogen. A single, Don't Give Me Away, was recorded under the name Jai and released on independent record label M&G Records in February 1997. The success of the single in the UK and across Europe attracted the attention of RCA Records, who released Rowe's debut album, Heaven, later that year. The album featured mostly original works co-written by Rowe with Bogen, Christopher Bemand, and Rob Watson, as well as contemporary covers of the Arthur Hamilton standard Cry Me a River and J. J. Cale's Magnolia. The single I Believe was a minor hit in the United States, and the album itself made a brief appearance at No. 49 on the Billboard Heatseekers Album Chart.

In a February 1998 interview with Rolling Stone, Rowe discussed his vocal influences and overall style, likening the content of his first album to "a cross between Portishead and Prince."

After residing in New York City for a couple of years, Rowe returned to Europe, eventually settling in Berlin. He continued to write and perform his own music, also penning songs for the German hip hop band Die Fantastischen Vier. Signing with manager Jobst Henning-Neermann, Rowe briefly returned to the U.S. in 2006 to record a new solo album. Lovelife was released 23 February 2007 on German record label Four Music but received only limited promotion and distribution. Shortly thereafter, Rowe contributed a song, The Dreaming, to an advertising campaign for the Tommy Hilfiger fragrance of the same name.

Rowe has since moved back to England. In June 2011, he married American musician Daphna Dove, having met her several years earlier when she contributed backing vocals to Lovelife. Most recently, Rowe collaborated with Dove in forming two musical groups, The Strings and VictoriA.
