= Last Train (Christine Anu and Paul Kelly song) =

1993 single by Christine Anu and Paul Kelly

- 12-inch single cover

Single by Christine Anu and Paul Kelly
- Released: 20 September 1993
- Length: 4:23
- Label: White
- Songwriters: Paul Kelly, Peter Crosbie, Angelique Cooper
- Producers: Angelique Cooper, Peter Crosbie

Christine Anu singles chronology
| "Last Train" (1993) | "Monkey & the Turtle" (1994) |

Paul Kelly singles chronology
| "When I First Met Your Ma" (1992) | "Last Train" (1993) | "Song from the Sixteenth Floor" (1994) |

Music video
- "Last Train" on YouTube

"Last Train to Heaven" is a song written by Paul Kelly for his album Gossip (1986), which was performed by his group, Paul Kelly & the Coloured Girls. It was re-written as "Last Train", a dance-orientated remix by producer Angelique Cooper, and is the first single released by Christine Anu. Anu and Kelly performed "Last Train" as a duet, which was issued on 20 September 1993 and peaked at No. 93 on the Australian ARIA Singles Chart in the following month. It was listed at No. 61 on national radio, Triple J's Hottest 100 for 1993.

== Background ==
In 1986 Paul Kelly wrote "Last Train to Heaven" as the lead track of the debut album, Gossip, by his group Paul Kelly and the Coloured Girls. The album was issued in September that year on Mushroom Records while Kelly was living in Sydney.

Early in the 1990s Anu and Kelly met each other when she was a dancer with Bangarra Dance Company and he was touring Queensland. During 1992 while still at her dance company Anu started singing backing vocals with Neil Murray's group, The Rainmakers. Murray encouraged her to sing lead vocals and she signed with White Records, a subsidiary of Mushroom Records. By early 1993 Kelly had relocated to Los Angeles and signed with Vanguard Records to tour the United States as a solo artist.

Kelly had stayed in the US for nine months and upon his return to Australia he was contacted by Mushroom Records to collaborate with Anu. Record producers Angelique Cooper and Peter Crosbie were engaged by Mushroom Records to create a dance remix based on Kelly’s track Last Train to Heaven from the Gossip album. They lifted Kelly’s vocals and Harmonica tracks from the master tapes and created the new track "Last Train", as a dance remix of "Last Train to Heaven". As a duo Anu and Kelly recorded "Last Train" with Anu on lead vocals, Kelly on harmonica and backing vocals and guest artist MC Opi's toasting, with Angelique Cooper and Peter Crosbie on keyboards, drums and samples. Anu praised Mushroom Records "[t]hey were really helpful in giving me my first song to record (Paul Kelly's 'Last Train'), and there was always the idea of we're going to get together and write songs — collaborate with other people for experience sake".

On 20 September 1993 the single was released on White Records (an alternative Mushroom Records label) and peaked at No. 93 on the Australian ARIA Singles Chart in the following month. It was listed at No. 61 on national radio station, Triple J's Hottest 100 for 1993. In an interview with The Sunday Telegraph Anu reflected on working with Kelly, "I'm in reverence just being in the presence of this man, knowing so many of the songs that have touched my heart have come from him".

"Last Train" was nominated for an ARIA Music Award at the 1994 ceremony for 'Best Video', which was directed by Paul Elliot and Sally Bongers. It also provided Anu with a nomination for 'Breakthrough Artist – Single' and a nomination for Angelique Cooper as 'Producer of the Year'.

On 29 July 1995 Anu promoted her debut album, Stylin' Up (June 1995), with a gig at The Metro in Sydney. The performance was recorded and included as a bonus live disc for the international release of the album, the disc included a live version of "Last Train". Anu collaborated with Kelly again for her second album, Come My Way (September 2000), where she recorded his track, "Beat of Your Heart", and the pair co-wrote "Jump to Love" together with Stuart Crichton.

== Music and lyrics ==
"Last Train to Heaven" was described as a "mesmerizing gospel/reggae rocker" by L.A. Times' reviewer, Steve Hochman. AllMusic's Mike DeGane found the lyrics were "sparse and repetitive" while the steel guitar conjured up a "hollow, distant feeling".

== Track listing ==
All tracks are written by Paul Kelly, Peter Crosbie, Angelique Cooper

| No. | Title | Length |
|---|---|---|
| 1. | "Last Train" (Master Mix) | 4:23 |
| 2. | "Last Train" (Groove Mix) | 5:13 |
| 3. | "Last Train" (Dub Mix) | 8:26 |

== Personnel ==
- Christine Anu – vocals
- Paul Kelly – acoustic guitar, backing vocals
- Janette Oparebea Nelson (MC Opi) – toasting Guest Artist
- Angelique Cooper & Peter Crosbie - Keyboards, drums & samples

Recording details

- Producing and arranging – Angelique Cooper, Peter Crosbie
- Recording – Angelique Cooper
- Programming – Peter Crosbie, Angelique Cooper
- Mixing – Peter Cobbin

== Charts ==
Weekly chart performance for "Last Train"
| Chart (1993) | Peak position |
|---|---|
| Australia (ARIA) | 93 |
