= Leeuwin Estate =

Winery and restaurant in Western Australia

- Location: Stevens Road, Leeuwin 6290, WA, Australia
- Coordinates: 34°0′47″S 115°3′57″E
- Wine region: Margaret River
- Other labels: Art Series, Prelude, Siblings
- Founded: 1973
- Key people: Denis & Trish Horgan, Founders; Justin Horgan & Simone Horgan-Furlong, Joint CEO's; Tim Lovett, Snr Winemaker, Phil Hutchison, Winemaker, David Winstanley, Viticulturalist.
- Cases/yr: 50,000
- Known for: Art Series Chardonnay; Art Series Cabernet Sauvignon
- Varietals: Chardonnay, Cabernet Sauvignon, Merlot, Pinot noir, Riesling, Sauvignon blanc, Semillon, Shiraz
- Other attractions: Restaurant; Leeuwin Estate Concert Series
- Distribution: International
- Tasting: Open to public
- Website: Leeuwin Estate

Leeuwin Estate is an Australian winery and restaurant based in the Margaret River wine region of Western Australia.

== History ==
Leeuwin Estate was established in 1973 by Denis and Tricia Horgan. The land was previously used as a cattle station and after having been purchased as part of a deal to buy a plumbing business by Denis Horgan in 1969, the land was converted to vineyards based on the advice of the Western Australian Department of Agriculture.

Robert Mondavi provided significant advice during the planning and setup stages of the estate after contacting the Horgans in 1972 to promote the potential that Margaret River had as a wine region and to look for investment opportunities. Initial plantings consisted of Chardonnay, Cabernet Sauvignon, Shiraz and Pinot noir.

Bob Cartwright was appointed as head winemaker in 1978. In the same year that Cartwright was appointed, the first vintage of wines were made. The vines had reached maturity and could provide enough grapes for commercial production and bottling levels. Cartwright held the position of head winemaker for 28 consecutive vintages until retiring in September 2005.

The current senior winemaker is Tim Lovett. The winery is still owned by Denis and Tricia Horgan, with their son Justin and daughter Simone working as the company Joint Chief Executive Officers.

Denis Horgan was awarded a Centenary Medal and both he and Tricia Horgan were inducted as Members of the Order of Australia in 2001 for services to tourism in Western Australia.

== Wines ==
Leeuwin Estate produces around 60,000 cases of wine each vintage and owns 121 acres of vineyards.

The most well known wine produced by Leeuwin Estate is the "Art Series Chardonnay". It has been described by wine critic James Halliday as "Australia's finest example" of Chardonnay and the Langton's Classification of Australian Wine places it at the highest level of "Exceptional". The first vintage of the Art Series Chardonnay was from 1980, with the first vintage of the wine receiving a recommendation as the best Chardonnay in the world by Decanter in 1982, bringing Leeuwin Estate to the attention of the wine world. A large proportion of the grapes used in this wine are from the "Block 20" vineyard, which was noted as one of the "Top 25 Australian Vineyards" by Australian Sommelier Magazine.

As well as the Chardonnay, Leewin Estate produces four other flagship "Art Series" wines from Cabernet Sauvignon, Shiraz, Riesling and Sauvignon Blanc. Each of the five "Art Series" wines in each vintage has a new painting printed on the label from an Australian artist.

The "Art Series Cabernet Sauvignon" is listed at the "Distinguished" level of the Langton's Classification, being described by Langton's as representative of the "quintessential southern Margaret River style" and by Robert Parker as "one of Australia’s great Bordeaux-styled Cabernets".

A number of lower priced wines are released under the "Prelude" and "Siblings" labels.

Since 2002, Leeuwin Estate has bottled all their wines under screw cap.

== Restaurant ==
The restaurant at Leeuwin Estate won the award for the Regional Restaurant of the Year in The West Australian Good Food Guide 2012. It was ranked as a two star restaurant in the 2013 edition of the same guide, and a Top 10 West Australian restaurant in 2017.

== Leeuwin Estate Concert Series ==
Leeuwin Estate hosts an annual series of concerts featuring major Australian and international performers. The first concert was a performance from the London Philharmonic Orchestra in 1985.

In February 2005, a concert was performed by Sting that attracted 6,000 attendees and raised over $4 million for the 2004 Indian Ocean earthquake and tsunami relief efforts.

== See also ==
- Australian wine
- List of wineries in Western Australia
- Western Australian wine
