= Chrissy's Island Family =

Children's album by Christine Anu (2007)

Studio album by Christine Anu
- Released: 4 July 2007
- Genre: Children's music
- Label: ABC Music

Christine Anu chronology
Acoustically (2005)	Chrissy's Island Family (2007)	Intimate and Deadly (2010)

Singles from Chrissy's Island Family
- 1. "Chrissy's Island Family" Released: 2007

Chrissy's Island Family is the fifth studio and first children's album by singer Christine Anu. The album features a collection of songs resonating from Anu's Indigenous cultural upbringing in the Torres Strait Island. Each song has been carefully written and developed by Christine Anu and contains a heartfelt message about the changing world we live in.

The album was released in July 2007 via ABC Music.

To coincide with the release of the album, a live stage show featuring Anu as a live action costume character toured Australia. The show is about Chrissy, a young, full of adventure girl who enjoys discovering the wonders of her island home in the Torres Strait. Featuring new songs and fun stories about her best friends and Tropical Island Blue, Chrissy delights all she meets. The show is described as uniquely Australian.

In May 2012, the show toured New Zealand and in schools in New South Wales in August, albeit without Anu.

At the ARIA Music Awards of 2007, the album was nominated for 'Best Children's Album', losing out to The Wiggles' Pop Go the Wiggles!.

== Track listing ==
1. "Chrissy's Island Family"
2. "Hello (Sea Napa)"
3. "Sunny Sunshine"
4. "Tropical Island Blue"
5. "Nak E Ba Na Na"
6. "Cassowary"
7. "Indijin-us"
8. "Waru"
9. "Chugga Choo"
10. "Rattle Drum"
11. "We Fish"
12. "Save Our World"
13. "Waltzing Matilda"
14. "My Friends"
15. "Island Christmas"
16. "Sea Shell Lullaby"
