= Zoë (British singer) =

British musical artist (born 1969)

- Born: Zoë Pollock; 19 January 1969 (age 57); Camberwell, London, England
- Labels: Polydor, M&G, BMG
- Website: zoepollock.com

Zoë Pollock (born 19 January 1969 in Peckham, London) is a British pop singer and songwriter, who had brief success in 1991 with two hit singles, "Sunshine on a Rainy Day", which climbed to number 4 on the UK Singles Chart, and "Lightning", which reached number 37 (and spent three weeks in the UK top 40). Zoë has released three solo albums and five singles.

== Career ==
She initially started her career in the mid-1980s, by auditioning for Jimi Cauty and Youth to be the lead singer for their band Brilliant. She began dating Youth, who would later produce her two solo albums.

Zoë released her debut single, "Sunshine on a Rainy Day", in late 1990, with two different music videos. It failed to reach the UK top 40. However, it was remixed and re-released in 1991 and became a top 10 hit, peaking at number 4. Her debut album, Scarlet Red and Blue included "Sunshine on a Rainy Day" and the follow-up single "Lightning", which peaked at number 37 on the UK Singles Chart. The album, despite good promotion and reviews, however, did not sell well, reaching only number 67 on the UK Albums Chart. It featured similar dance-pop tracks as well as soulful ballads. "Holy Days" was the last single from Scarlet Red and Blue, released in February 1992, but only managed number 72. In 1991, Zoë sang backing vocals on Bananarama's Pop Life album, which was produced by Youth.

In 1996, Zoë re-emerged (still signed to M&G Records) with a revamped image, style and sound. Her album, Hammer, was more rock sounding. The title track was released as a single, but failed to reach the UK Singles Chart. After this album she disappeared from the music scene for several years, travelling around the world and becoming a sculptor and potter.

Zoë recorded an EP under the alias Hephzibah Broom, released by an independent Manchester label. Zoë became part of the female folk duo Mama, with singer Sarah McQuaid. They released their debut album, Crow Coyote Buffalo, in late 2008. The album includes a folk re-recording of Zoë's signature song, "Sunshine on a Rainy Day", which the group also made a music video for.

In 2021, Zoë released Lago Ausente, an album of original songs that celebrate her love of nature and plant medicine. Produced by Liam Fletcher, the album features guest performances by guitarists Fabiano do Nascimento and Sebastian Juliussen, percussionist Ricardo "Tiki" Pasillas, shakuhachi player Adrian Freedman, violinist Bridget O'Donnell, cellist Julia Morneweg and double bassist Misha Mullov-Abbado, plus Fletcher himself on harmonium and synthesiser.

== Personal life ==
Pollock moved to Cornwall and in 1998 married Murray Lachlan Young, a British poet. They have two children, but were divorced in 2009.

== Discography ==
=== Albums ===
Year	Title	Details	Peak chart positions	
Year	Title	Details	UK	AUS
1991	Scarlet Red and Blue	Released: 1991; Label: Polydor, M&G	67	193
1996	Hammer	Released: 1996; Label: M&G, BMG	—	—
2021	Lago Ausente	Released: 2021; Label: Self-released	—	—

=== Singles ===
Year	Title	Peak chart positions				
Year	Title	UK	AUS	IRE	SWE	ZIM
1990	"Sunshine on a Rainy Day"	53	—	—	—	—
1991	"Sunshine on a Rainy Day" (remix)	4	147	9	40	1
1991	"Lightning"	37	156	28	—	—
1992	"Holy Days"	72	—	—	—	—
1996	"Hammer"	177	—	—	—	—
