= Leeuwin Estate Concert Series =

The Leeuwin Estate Concert Series are annual open-air events featuring international and Australian performers at Leeuwin Estate Winery.

== History ==
The first concert was a performance from the London Philharmonic Orchestra in 1985, with the Australian tour underwritten by Leeuwin Estate owners Denis and Tricia Horgan on the condition that the orchestra play at Leeuwin Estate. Hosting the concert was considered a risk due to the physically remote location of the Margaret River, being 260 kilometres from the state capital of Perth. Friends tried to talk the Horgans out of the idea, but they went ahead and the concert was a great success, with 5000 people attending and the event attracting international coverage.

The next two concerts also featured orchestras, with the Berlin Staatskapelle performing in 1986 and the Royal Danish Orchestra in 1987. In 1988 the series featured its first individual star, when the Chicago Symphony Orchestra could not attend and instead Ray Charles was brought in to perform with the West Australian Symphony Orchestra. The West Australian Symphony Orchestra has featured eight further times since accompanying other musicians.

In 1990 Leeuwin Estate hosted Dame Kiri Te Kanawa, with other stars Diana Ross and Tom Jones performing in 1992 and 1993 respectively. 1993 also saw the first iteration of the "Australian Family Concert" series featuring Australian performers at a separate event each year.

In February 2005, a concert was performed by Sting that drew an audience of 6,000 and raised over $4 million for the 2004 Indian Ocean earthquake and tsunami relief efforts after Sting had to cancel a scheduled concert in Sri Lanka due to the disaster.

The 26th year of the series in 2010 saw Boz Scaggs & Michael McDonald perform in front of a sold-out crowd of 6500 people.

The concert has become a major tourism draw for the Margaret River and Western Australia. Denis Horgan was awarded with a Centenary Medal and both he and Tricia Horgan were inducted as Members of the Order of Australia in 2001 for services to tourism in Western Australia.

== Leeuwin Concert Series ==
The following is a list of the performers and the year of the concert.

Year	Performer
1985	The London Philharmonic Orchestra
1986	The Berlin Staatskapelle
1987	The Royal Danish Orchestra
1988	Ray Charles and The West Australian Symphony Orchestra
1989	Dionne Warwick and the West Australian Symphony Orchestra
1990	Dame Kiri Te Kanawa, James Galway and the West Australian Symphony Orchestra
1991	The Czech Philharmonic Orchestra
1992	Diana Ross
1993	Tom Jones
1994	Julia Migenes, Perrin Allen and the West Australian Symphony Orchestra
1995	George Benson, Fab Four
1996	Dame Kiri Te Kanawa and the West Australian Symphony Orchestra
1997	Shirley Bassey and the Adelaide Symphony Orchestra
1998	Julio Iglesias
1999	Bryn Terfel, Yvonne Kenny and the West Australian Symphony Orchestra
2000	Michael Crawford and the West Australian Symphony Orchestra
2001	Roberta Flack
2002	John Farnham
2003	k.d. lang
2003	Picnic in the Vineyard with James Taylor
2004	Lesley Garrett & Anthony Warlow with the West Australian Symphony Orchestra
2005	Sting
2005	Jack Johnson
2006	Amici Forever & Jane Rutter
2007	Simply Red
2008	Yvonne Kenny, David Hobson & The West Australian Symphony Orchestra
2009	Chris Isaak
2010	Boz Scaggs & Michael McDonald
2011	Roxy Music
2012	Marina Prior, David Hobson and The Perth Symphony Orchestra
2013	Carole King
2014	Diana Krall and The Perth Symphony Orchestra
2015	Bryn Terfel, Rachelle Durkin with special guest Lisa McCune & The Perth Symphony Orchestra
2016	Chris Isaak
2017	James Taylor & His All Star Band
2018	Jackson Browne
2019	Paul Kelly
2020	No concert
2021	No concert
2022	No concert

== Australian Family Concerts ==
The following is a list of performers and years as part of the annual Australian Family Concerts.

Year	Performer
1993	Kate Ceberano and friends
1994	Yothu Yindi
1995	Black Sorrows and Vika and Linda Bull
1996	Paul Kelly and Joan Armatrading
1997	Yothu Yindi
1999	The Whitlams
2000	Paul Kelly, Uncle Bill and Kasey Chambers
2001	Tex Perkins and Jimmy Little
2002	The Waifs and Oh Susanna
2003	Mahotella Queens
2004	The Waifs
2005	The Waifs
2006	The John Butler Trio
2006	Alex Lloyd
2007	Kate Ceberano
2008	The John Butler Trio & The Waifs
2009	The Waifs
2010	The John Butler Trio
2011	Pete Murray and Passenger
2012	N/A
2013	The John Butler Trio
2014	Pete Murray
2015	Bernard Fanning
2016	John Butler Trio & The Waifs
2017	Bernard Fanning
2018	
2019	John Butler & Missy Higgins
