= I Won't Go Home 'Til Morning =

Studio album by Sarah McQuaid
- Released: October 2008
- Recorded: 2008
- Studio: Marguerite Studios, Dublin
- Genre: Folk
- Length: 46:33
- Producer: Gerry O'Beirne

Sarah McQuaid chronology
When Two Lovers Meet (1997)	I Won't Go Home 'Til Morning (2008)	The Plum Tree and the Rose (2012)

I Won't Go Home 'Til Morning is the second album recorded by singer-songwriter Sarah McQuaid.

McQuaid's mother died in January 2004 which led her to revisit the songs they sang together when she was a child, turning to the Southern Appalachian songs and tunes that she grew up with. The album is accordingly dedicated to her mother.

The album features two original songs alongside covers of folk songs of the US. It was noted as "a touching album from a genuine artist" by Hot Press.

== Track listing ==
I Won't Go Home 'Til Morning track listing
No.	Title	Length
1.	"The Chickens They Are Crowing"	5:33
2.	"West Virginia Boys"	2:09
3.	"Shady Grove / Cluck Old Hen"	2:21
4.	"Ode to Billie Joe"	5:38
5.	"Uncloudy Day"	3:36
6.	"Wondrous Love"	3:11
7.	"Only an Emotion"	3:32
8.	"In the Pines"	4:42
9.	"East Virginia"	4:39
10.	"The Wagoner's Lad"	4:02
11.	"Last Song"	5:00
Total length:		44:23

== Personnel ==
- Sarah McQuaid – vocals [1–2, 4, 6–11], guitar [1, 4, 7–11], melody guitar [3, 5];
- Gerry O'Beirne – 12-string guitar [1, 3], 6-string guitar [3], slide guitar [4, 8], tiple [3, 5], ukulele [8], ebow [1];
- Trevor Hutchinson – double bass [4, 8–9, 11], electric bass [5];
- Rosie Shipley – fiddle [1];
- Máire Breatnach – fiddle [7, 9], viola [11];
- Liam Bradley – percussion [1–2, 5], vocals [6]

=== Production ===
- Produced by Gerry O'Beirne
- Engineered by Trevor Hutchinson
- Recorded and mixed at Marguerite Studios, Glasnevin, Dublin
- Mastered by Sander van der Heide at Polyhymnia International, Baarn, The Netherlands
- Design and original cover artwork by Mary Guinan
- Photography by Alastair Bruce

=== Technical ===
- Sarah plays a 1965 Martin D-28
- DADGAD tuning
- John Pearse strings
