= Party (Christine Anu song) =

1995 singly by Christine Anu

- CD single cover

Single by Christine Anu

from the album Stylin' Up
- B-side: "Kulba Yaday"
- Released: 5 June 1995
- Length: 3:04
- Label: White, Mushroom
- Songwriters: Christine Anu, David Bridie
- Producer: David Bridie

Christine Anu singles chronology
"Island Home" (1995)	"Party" (1995)	"Come On" (1995)

Music video
- "Party" on YouTube

"Party" is a song by Australian pop singer Christine Anu. It was released as the third single from her debut studio album, Stylin' Up (1995). The song debuted at number 98 on the Australian Singles Chart before peaking at number 20 in October 1995. It remains Anu's highest-charting single.

== Track listing ==
Australian CD single (D904)

1. "Party" (single) – 3:04
2. "My Island Home" (single) – 3:51
3. "Party" (Handbag mix) – 3:18
4. "Party" (The Extended Handbag mix) – 6:55
5. "My Island Home" (The Chant mix) – 4:12
6. "My Island Home" (acapella) – 3:50
7. "Kulba Yaday" – 4:15

== Charts ==
=== Weekly charts ===
Chart (1995)	Peak position
Australia (ARIA)	20

=== Year-end charts ===
Chart (1995)	Position
Australia (ARIA)	68
