= Sound Quality (radio program) =

Sound Quality was a radio program broadcast on the Australian Broadcasting Corporation's Radio National network between 1995 and 2015, featuring new music, generally in the genres of electronica, but including other genres as well. The show was produced and presented by Tim Ritchie.

Ritchie began his radio broadcasting career in 1976, when as a schoolboy, he rang ABC's youth radio station Double J and gave a critique of the Double J presenter's performance. The presenter suggested that if Ritchie could do a better job, he should do the show the next day. He did, and worked his way through a university degree as he worked shifts on Double J and then Triple J, including a stint in New York, before moving across to Radio National. He started Sound Quality in 1995.

Past programs since 1999 are as of 2021 still available on the ABC website.
