= Island Christmas =

Album by Christine Anu

Studio album by Christine Anu
- Released: 7 November 2014
- Recorded: June/July 2014
- Genre: Christmas music
- Label: Social Family Records

Christine Anu chronology
Rewind: The Aretha Franklin Songbook (2012)	Island Christmas (2014)	ReStylin' Up 20 Years (2015)

Island Christmas is the seventh studio and first Christmas album by ARIA Award winning, Torres Strait Islander singer Christine Anu. The album features The Voice season 2 finalist, Steve Clisby, actor and children’s entertainer, Jay Laga'aia and Anu's children Kuiam and Zipporah. The album was released on 7 November 2014.

At the ARIA Music Awards of 2015, the album was nominated for Best World Music Album. This was Anu's 17th ARIA Music Award nomination. The album lost out to The Gospel Album by Gurrumul.

== Background and release ==
In July 2014, Social Family Records announced Christine Anu had signed to their label. It was announced Anu would release a Christmas album in November. Christine Anu has had a long career singing Christmas song as a regular performer on Carols in the Domain, an appearance in Myer’s Spirit of Christmas and recording the theme song for Blinky Bill’s "White Christmas"

Upon release, Anu said a Christmas album was never something she considered but she did not take long to be 'coaxed around'. "I first thought people wouldn’t like mine and they might think ‘oh my God not another Christmas album’, but this isn’t your traditional Christmas album — there’s no mention of snow. Instead of snow you have colours."

"Silent Night" includes a verse in her native indigenous language and "Island Christmas" is about Christmas Day in the Dreamtime.

"I wrote the title track when my kids and their friends and cousins were quite young – we love singing – and I’d always get them to sing along with me. So even though they’re now a lot older, the inclusion of their voices on the album is incredibly nostalgic for me – it’s what Christmas is all about, in creating and recalling special memories each year," said Christine.

== Promotion ==
Anu released a music video for the track "Island Christmas" on 2 December 2014. Anu performed tracks from the album and signed copies in December 2014.

- 6 December, Sydney, Westfield Parramatta
- 7 December, Lake Macquarie, International Children’s Games Opening Ceremony
- 13 December, Parklea Markets

== Reviews ==
The Music AU gave the album 3 out of 5 saying; "Favouring simple arrangements, Christine Anu takes a relaxed, sincere and distinctly Australian approach on this holiday album. Her voice is a joy to listen to and she performs these songs honestly and soulfully. Though there are a few bland moments, she largely makes these songs her own. "Silent Night" features a verse in her mother’s native Torres Island language and the unaccompanied "I'll Be Home for Christmas" is haunting. Joni Mitchell’s "River" is beautifully recreated, while Paul Kelly’s "How to Make Gravy" is moving as always. "

== Track listing ==
No.	Title	Writer(s)	Length
1.	"Silent Night"	Franz Xaver Gruber	4:38
2.	"Carol of the Drum / Peace of Earth" (with Jay Laga'aia)		3:43
3.	"Island Christmas" (featuring Kuiam and Zipporah Anu)	Christine Anu	3:13
4.	"How to Make Gravy"	Paul Kelly	4:38
5.	"Have Yourself a Merry Little Christmas" (with Steve Clisby)	Hugh Martin, Ralph Blane	4:02
6.	"Christmas! Baby Please Come Home"	Jeff Barry, Ellie Greenwich, Phil Spector	2:59
7.	"Ooh Child" (featuring Kuiam and Zipporah Anu)	Stan Vincent	3:35
8.	"River"	Joni Mitchell	3:55
9.	"Christmas Card"		3:49
10.	"Christmas Medley"		3:12
11.	"I'll Be Home for Christmas"	Bing Crosby	3:10
12.	"Auld Lang Syne"	Robert Burns	4:17

== Charts ==
Weekly chart performance for Island Christmas
Chart (2014)	Peak position
Australian Albums (ARIA)	146

== Release history ==
Country	Date	Format	Label	Catalogue
Australia	7 November 2014	CD, digital download	Social Family Records	SFR0023
