= Waku: Minaral a Minalay =

Album by Christine Anu

Studio album by Christine Anu
- Released: 2 August 2024
- Venue: Cairns, Australia, New Zealand, Papua New Guinea, Torres Strait Islands, Solomon Islands
- Length: 51:57
- Label: ABC
- Producer: David Bridie

Christine Anu chronology
ReStylin' Up 20 Years (2015)	Waku: Minaral a Minalay (2024)

Singles from Waku: Minaral a Minalay
- 1. "Waku: Minaral a Minalay" Released: 24 May 2024

Waku: Minaral a Minalay is the eighth studio album by Torres Strait Islander-born, Australian singer Christine Anu. The album was recorded in several places including Cairns, Australia, New Zealand, Papua New Guinea, the Torres Strait Islands and the Solomon Islands and was originally scheduled for release on 19 July 2024 before being pushed back to 2 August 2024.

Via a press release, Anu said the "waku" means "the mat". Anu said "You do everything in your life on that mat, and when you die, you're covered by it – like a blanket." Anu continued saying, "This album is about reconnecting with my grandfather as a young father back in post-World War II, in the Torres Strait region. I sing about a time from long ago... Waku: Minaral a Minalay creates a landscape, a picture, a soundscape of feeling like you were there listening to these songs when they were being made." The album includes songs written by Anu, her grandfather (Nadi) and her daughter (Zipporah).

The album's title track was nominated for Song of the Year at the National Indigenous Music Awards 2024.

On 27 July 2024, Anu released a mini-documentary of the same name to support the album.

Anu promoted the album with performances at the Indigenous Rodeo Championships Rock Concert, during the Mount Isa Mines Rodeo on 8 August 2024, the Cairns Festival on 23 August 2024, and the North Australian Festival of Arts on 13 October 2024.

At the 2024 ARIA Music Awards, the album was nominated for Best World Music Album.

== Reception ==
Andrew Stafford from The Guardian said "Waku is a grownup, bilingual album by an artist in full command of her identity and artistry."

Greg Phillips from Australian Musician called the album "unquestionably, the most important work of Christine's three-decade career to date." The Australian called the album "stunning, stirring bilingual fusion."

== Track listing ==
Waku: Minaral a Minalay track listing
No.	Title	Writer(s)	Length
1.	"Melawal"	Nadi Anu	2:03
2.	"Koey Dhoerim"	N. Anu	2:14
3.	"Waku: Minaral a Minalay"	Christine Anu; David Bridie	4:55
4.	"The Coming Monsoon"	N. Anu; Bridie; Danazur Nadai	3:49
5.	"Nur Nur"	N. Anu; Bridie; Nadai	3:21
6.	"Tobacco and Vicks"	C. Anu; Bridie	1:42
7.	"When It Rains"	Bridie	2:48
8.	"Aukum of Saibai"	C. Anu; Bridie	4:24
9.	"My Popu Nadhi Anu"	C. Anu; Bridie	4:59
10.	"Laga Saibai"	N. Anu	2:46
11.	"Dhibagaw Gabu"	Zipporah Corser Anu	2:28
12.	"Seseku"	N. Anu	0:42
13.	"The Crab and the Suckerfish (Gapu a Githalay)"	C. Anu; Bridie	3:37
14.	"Kole Kolele"	N. Anu	1:32
15.	"Adhibuya"	N. Anu; Bridie	2:26
16.	"Ari Pudhiz"	Bridie	3:45
17.	"Laga Wakemab"	N. Anu	4:18
Total length:			51:57

== Charts ==
Chart performance for Waku: Minaral a Minalay
Chart (2024)	Peak position
Australian Independent Albums (AIR)	9
