= Now Until the Break of Day =

- CD single cover

Single by Bazmark presents Christine Anu and David Hobson with Royce Doherty

from the album Something for Everybody
- B-side: "Happy Feet"
- Released: 25 October 1997
- Recorded: July 1997
- Genre: Pop/Electronic
- Length: 4:07
- Label: EMI Records
- Songwriter: Benjamin Britten
- Producers: Blam, Paul Mac

Christine Anu singles chronology
"Come On" (1995)	"Now Until the Break of Day" (1997)	"Sunshine on a Rainy Day" (2000)

"Now Until the Break of Day" is a song credited to "Bazmark presents Christine Anu and David Hobson with Royce Doherty". It is included on Baz Luhrmann's debut studio album, Something for Everybody (1998). The track peaked at number 50 in Australia. The song is an arrangement of the Act 3 finale of Benjamin Britten's 1960 opera A Midsummer Night's Dream.

At the ARIA Music Awards of 1998, the Baz Luhrmann-directed video won the ARIA Award for Best Video.

== Track listings ==
1. "Now Until the Break of Day" (Radio edit)
2. "Happy Feet" (High Heels Mix) (credited to Jack Hilton And His Orchestra)
3. "Now Until the Break of Day" (Karaoke mix)
4. "Now Until the Break of Day" (Feel Licks mix)

== Chart positions ==
Chart (1997)	Peak position
Australia (ARIA)	50
