= Rewind: The Aretha Franklin Songbook =

Studio album by Christine Anu
- Released: 3 August 2012
- Genre: Soul; pop
- Label: MGM
- Producer: Christine Anu

Christine Anu chronology
Intimate and Deadly (2010)	Rewind: The Aretha Franklin Songbook (2012)	Island Christmas (2014)

Rewind: The Aretha Franklin Songbook is the sixth studio and first tribute album by ARIA Award winning, Torres Strait Islander singer Christine Anu. The album and tour were announced in April 2012 and released on 3 August 2012, to coincide with Aretha Franklin's 70th Birthday.

Upon release, Anu said: "Nobody says it or sings it better than Ms. Aretha Franklin. She is one of my greatest influences and an inspiration to black pride and feminine empowerment. I truly believe she is the greatest soul singer of our time!"

Anu told the Star Observer: "The idea's been three years in the making. I've been adding covers into my live sets in the past 10 years until someone said 'All these songs are by Aretha—you should do an Aretha Franklin album.' Just the thought of it made me nervous. It's been on hold while I built a little bit of confidence to fill such amazingly huge shoes."

Anu toured the album and received positive reviews. In December 2012, Anu announced additional tour dates for 2013. "2012 was a fantastic year and I'm really pleased Rewind connected with so many people. I'm excited to announce more shows in 2013. This time I will be doing a more intimate version of the show, so that it can be seen by people in regional and remote areas of Australia."

== Track listing ==
1. "Respect" – 2:36
2. "The House That Jack Built" – 2:24
3. "Since You've Been Gone" – 2:43
4. "You're All I Need (To Get By)" – 3:31
5. "Today I Sing the Blues" – 4:12
6. "Angel" – 3:48
7. "(You Make Me Feel Like) A Natural Woman" – 2:59
8. "Chain of Fools" – 3:11
9. "Baby I Love You" – 2:57
10. "A Change Is Gonna Come" – 5:04
11. "Rock Steady" – 4:31

== Release history ==
Country	Date	Format	Label	Catalogue
Australia	3 August 2012	CD, digital download	Christine Anu, MGM	ANU001
