= Come On (Christine Anu song) =

- CD single cover

Single by Christine Anu

from the album Stylin' Up
- Released: 23 October 1995
- Recorded: 1994
- Genre: Pop
- Length: 3:37
- Label: White Records, Mushroom Records
- Songwriters: Christine Anu, David Bridie
- Producer: David Bridie

Christine Anu singles chronology
"Party" (1995)	"Come On" (1995)	"Now Until the Break of Day" (1997)

Music video
- "Come On" on YouTube

"Come On" is a song recorded by Christine Anu. It was released as the fourth and final single from her debut studio album, Stylin' Up (1995). The song peaked at number 94 in Australia on the ARIA Charts.

At the ARIA Music Awards of 1996 the song won two of three awards for which it was nominated. It won Best Female Artist and Best Indigenous Release (for the second consecutive year), but lost Best Pop Release to Nick Cave and Kylie Minogue's "Where the Wild Roses Grow".

== Track listings ==
CD single (D 1198)

1. "Come On"
2. "Keep Up"
3. "Last Train" (Paul Kelly and Christine Anu) [Live at ABC Studios 23 July 1995]

== Chart positions ==
Chart (1995)	Peak position
Australia (ARIA)	94
