= David Hobson (tenor) =

Australian opera tenor and composer (born 1960)

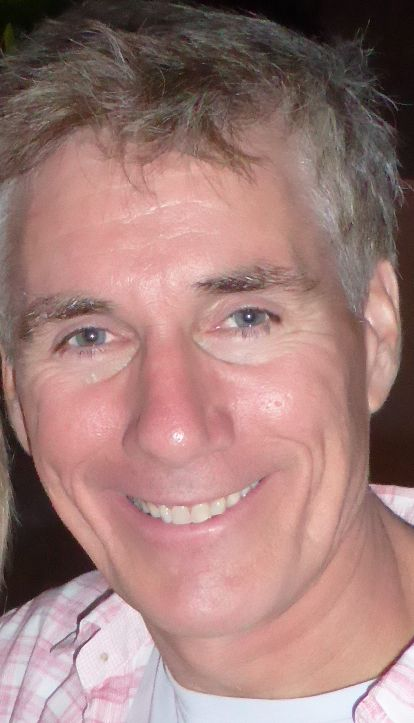
David Hobson, 2014

David Hobson (born 18 November 1960) is an Australian opera tenor and composer.

== Career ==
Born in Ballarat, Australia, Hobson sang with church and school choirs and local music groups as a child, but he was still vocally untrained when he performed as lead singer and bass guitarist with rock bands while studying at the University of Melbourne. However, despite the lack of a demonstration tape of Macbeth (see below) he was invited to join the Victoria State Opera, understudying the role of Frederic in the VSO's Joseph Papp (Broadway) version of The Pirates of Penzance in 1986. This led to his becoming a member of the company's Young Artists Programme, and making his debut as Rodolfo in a Victorian country tour production of La bohème in 1987. In 1988 he made his debut with The Australian Opera (now Opera Australia) when he created the role of Lawrence in the world premiere of Brian Howard's opera Whitsunday.

He is the composer of Macbeth (a 1985 music theatre piece), Remembering Rosie (2001 chamber opera), The Loch Ard Suite (for the 2002 light/sound installation Shipwrecked at Warrnambool) and the award-winning 2004 orchestral score for the Australian film One Perfect Day, as well as a number of songs including Inside This Room and the title song for One Perfect Day.

In 1990, he reprised the role of Rodolfo, opposite Cheryl Barker as Mimì, in a new production of La bohème for The Australian Opera, directed by Baz Luhrmann; this went on to become one of the company's most successful productions. It was filmed during its 1993 return season and broadcast on ABC TV several times. Released on VHS in 1994, it was to become the first opera available on DVD (1998) and continues to be a best seller worldwide.

Hobson's Gilbert and Sullivan roles with Opera Australia include Nanki-Poo in The Mikado, Marco Palmieri in The Gondoliers, Ralph Rackstraw in H.M.S. Pinafore, and the Defendant in Trial by Jury.

Hobson returned to the role of Frederic in the record-breaking Opera Australia production of The Pirates of Penzance with seasons during 2006 in Sydney at the Sydney Opera House, in Canberra, and in Brisbane at the Lyric Theatre, Queensland Performing Arts Centre. The national tour continued in 2007, with seasons in Adelaide and Melbourne, making a total of 100 performances in ten months.

His operatic repertoire extends from 17th century works to the present, Hobson's high lyric tenor voice (he is actually a rare haute-contre or baroque tenor) is best suited to the baroque and bel canto operas of the 18th and early 19th centuries, such as those composed by Mozart and Rossini. His Mozart roles include Ferrando in Così fan tutte, Don Ottavio in Don Giovanni, Tamino in The Magic Flute and Belmonte in The Abduction from the Seraglio. His Rossini roles include Lindoro in L'italiana in Algeri, Ramiro in La Cenerentola, Count Almaviva in The Barber of Seville, Dorvil in La scala di seta and Florville in Il signor Bruschino.

Many other roles have included Ernesto in Donizetti's Don Pasquale, Nadir in Bizet's The Pearl Fishers, and a highly acclaimed Orphée in Gluck's Orphée et Eurydice, (the rarely performed 1774 Paris version for tenor).

In 2008, he made his role debut as Nemorino in Donizetti's L'elisir d'amore with the Victorian Opera, and created several roles in their world premiere season of Through the Looking Glass by Alan John.

Hobson created the role of the Chevalier de Danceny in the San Francisco Opera world premiere of The Dangerous Liaisons by Conrad Susa, as well as the Architect in The Eighth Wonder by Alan John and Michael Chamberlain in Lindy by Moya Henderson for Opera Australia.

In 2006, he sang the title role in a Perth International Arts Festival concert performance of Candide by Leonard Bernstein and received rave reviews. Just weeks later he had the honour of singing before Elizabeth II and many other distinguished guests, at a State Dinner in Canberra.

Hobson is a much sought-after concert artist, frequently appearing in Musica Viva recitals, and oratorios such as Handel's Messiah, and Mendelssohn's Elijah, as well as opera galas, recitals and solo concerts, displaying both his extensive classical and lighter repertoires. Since 1991 he has been a regular performer at the outdoor Christmas concerts in either Sydney (Carols in the Domain) or Melbourne (Carols by Candlelight) and, more recently, has appeared regularly in Christmas at the House at the Sydney Opera House. In February 2008 he made his debut at the Leeuwin Estate Concert Series in Margaret River with Australian soprano Yvonne Kenny, and in March returned to Mildura with another regular partner, Marina Prior, to sing at the Opera by the Lock. Working around his opera, recording and TV commitments, Hobson performed a series of concerts between April and September, appearing in Melbourne and regional Victoria and, marking the release of his CD, A Little Closer, performed in two concerts in the Sydney Opera House Concert Hall in November.

Hobson and bass-baritone Teddy Tahu Rhodes' CD You'll Never Walk Alone was released in February 2009, followed in March by an extensive Australian recital tour. One of the recitals was in Hobart, and a few weeks later Hobson returned for concerts with the Tasmanian Symphony Orchestra in Hobart and Launceston.

Much of the second half of 2009 was occupied with touring for Musica Viva, while December was devoted to another performance of Handel's Messiah with the Royal Melbourne Philharmonic at Melbourne Town Hall, a season of Christmas at the House in the Sydney Opera House Concert Hall, and an appearance at Melbourne's traditional Christmas Eve celebration Carols by Candlelight, at the Sidney Myer Music Bowl, televised nationally.

Hobson's 2010 schedule began with a return to Opera in the Alps at Beechworth, with Marina Prior, and continued with a reprise performance in the title role of Candide for the Sydney Festival concert presentation of Opera in the Domain (both in January); another recital with Teddy Tahu Rhodes in Adelaide (March); and the principal role of Eisenstein – which he last performed in 2000 – in the Opera Australia production of the Johann Strauss II operetta Die Fledermaus at the State Theatre, Arts Centre Melbourne, during May. April saw Hobson's debut as a specialist presenter on the new pay-TV STVDIO arts channel.

Hobson followed the Fledermaus season of traditional operetta with something completely different when he appeared at the Adelaide Cabaret Festival in his stagework Am I Really Here? in June 2010 and a performance of Zender's contemporary interpretation of Schubert's Winterreise at the Brisbane Powerhouse in July. The CD album Singing for Love, a compilation of work by Hobson and Yvonne Kenny, was released in 2010 before their nationwide concert tour. A busy and varied year concluded with a series of concerts in four states, including three performances in Brisbane for the 25th anniversary season of Spirit of Christmas at QPAC and a regulation appearance at Melbourne's Carols by Candlelight.

Hobson's 2011 schedule included a West Australian Opera concert performance of Die Fledermaus in Perth; a flying visit to New Zealand in March; a third concert appearance with the Victoria Welsh Choir in June; his role debut as Count Danilo in Opera Australia's new production of Lehár's The Merry Widow, followed immediately by another national concert tour with Teddy Tahu Rhodes and performances of Handel's Messiah with the Sydney Philharmonia Choirs and Orchestra at the Sydney Opera House Concert Hall. There was another compilation CD, The Best of David Hobson and more solo concerts in several states.

In 2012 and 2013, Hobson appeared as Caractacus Potts opposite Rachael Beck as Truly Scrumptious in an Australian touring production of the musical Chitty Chitty Bang Bang.

The inaugural Australian cruise of the performing arts on the MS Radiance of the Seas in November 2014 included Hobson as well as, among others, Cheryl Barker, Colin Lane, Teddy Tahu Rhodes, Simon Tedeschi, Elaine Paige, Marina Prior, and Jonathon Welch. Hobson made his company debut for Opera Queensland in a staged performance of Bernstein's Candide in 2015, directed by Lindy Hume. Later that year, he joined Teddy Tahu Rhodes, Lisa McCune and Greta Bradman for a tour of the five Australian mainland state capitals and Auckland and Christchurch, New Zealand – where Jennifer Ward-Lealand replaced McCune – From Broadway to La Scala.

== Other activities ==
Hobson was mentor to model and TV host Erika Heynatz when they won the Seven Network reality singing show, It Takes Two in 2006, and returned in the 2007 season to partner celebrity Mimi Macpherson. In late 2007 Hobson appeared in Dancing with the Stars Series 7, with he and his mentor, Karina Schembri, finishing in third place. In 2008 he resumed his more familiar role of mentor to win It Takes Two Series 3, with Julia Morris.

In 2000, Hobson became the Inaugural Patron of the Ballarat Arts Foundation, and continues in that capacity.

At the end of March 2008, Musica Viva Australia announced Hobson's appointment as the Musica Viva in Schools Ambassador for a programme to raise an awareness of the importance of music education in Australian schools.

In 2019, Hobson made a guest appearance on The Wiggles, performing a reworked version of Funiculì, Funiculà alongside fellow Australian opera singer (and current Red Wiggle) Simon Pryce.

== Private life ==
Hobson's early life was spent in Ballarat with parents Kathleen and Phil and siblings Anne, Jane, Ruth and Fiona.

He met his wife, ballerina Amber Simpson, when they performed together in 1992 in L'italiana in Algeri. They married in 1997. They have two children; daughter Madi (born 1998) and son Sam (born 2001).

== Discography ==
Several of Hobson's operatic performances are available on DVD, and his CD albums include Inside This Room (a collaboration with David Hirschfelder), Cinema Paradiso (film songs), Tenor and Baritone (with Anthony Warlow), The Exquisite Hour (a collection of French art songs) and The Promise (his arrangements of an eclectic selection of songs from musicals, pop, etc., and two of his own compositions), which achieved Gold status within three weeks of release in November 2007. His 2008 album, A Little Closer, covers classic pop songs and features two more of his compositions. His CD Enchanted Way, featuring mainly Celtic folksongs of the British Isles, was released in 2010.

=== DVDs ===
- 1989: The Gondoliers, Australian Opera, DVD
- 1991: Don Giovanni, DVD
- 1993: La bohème with Cheryl Barker, directed by Baz Luhrmann, DVD
- 1994: Orphée et Eurydice, DVD
- 2005: H.M.S. Pinafore, Trial by Jury, Opera Australia, DVD
- 2006: The Pirates of Penzance, Opera Australia, DVD
- 2011: Così fan tutte, DVD

=== Albums ===
List of albums, with Australian chart positions
Title	Album details	Peak chart positions	Certifications
Title	Album details	AUS	Certifications
Inside This Room (with David Hirschfelder)	Released: August 1999 (CD); Label: Mushroom Records (MUSH33241.2)	70	
French & Italian Arias (with Tasmanian Symphony Orchestra & Marco Guidarini)	Released: November 1999 (CD, Cassette); Label: ABC Classics (461 477–4)	96	
Handel Arias	Released: May 2002 (CD, Cassette); Label: ABC Classics (472 151–2)	28	
Cinema Paradiso	Released: May 2004 (CD); Label: ABC Classics (476 160–4)	98	
Exquisite Hour	Released: 2006 (CD); Label: ABC Classics (476 5282)	—	
Presenting David Hobson	Released: 2006 (CD); Label: ABC Classics (476 5690); Note: Compilation	30	
The Promise	Released: November 2007 (CD); Label: ABC Classics (530 4197)	14	ARIA: Gold
A Little Closer	Released: October 2008 (CD); Label: ABC Classics (4766934)	36	
You'll Never Walk Alone (with Teddy Tahu Rhodes)	Released: April 2009 (CD); Label: ABC Classics (4763284)	16	
The Enchanted Way	Released: April 2010 (CD); Label: ABC Classics (4763853)	18	
Singing for Love – Immortal Duets, Arias and Songs (with Yvonne Kenny)	Released: August 2010 (CD); Label: ABC Classics (4763853)	57	
The Best of David Hobson	Released: April 2011 (CD); Label: ABC Classics		
Endless Days	Released: 2012 (CD); Label: ABC Classics		
My Baby Just Cares for Me (with Rachael Beck)	Released: 2014 (CD); Label: ABC Classics (481 0918)	39	
David Hobson By Request	Released: 2016 (CD); Label: David Hobson		
From Broadway To La Scala (with Greta Bradman, Lisa McCune & Teddy Tahu Rhodes)	Released: 2017 (CD); Label: ABC Classics (482 370–0)	—	
Holy City	Released: October 2017 (CD, Digital); Label: David Hobson		
The 2 of Us, volumes I and II (with Marina Prior)	Released: 2023 (CD); Label:		

=== Charting singles ===
Year	Title	Chart positions	Album
Year	Title	AUS	Album
1997	"Now Until the Break of Day" (Baz Luhrmann with Christine Anu and Royce Doherty)	50	Something for Everybody

== Awards and nominations ==
=== ARIA Awards ===
The ARIA Music Awards are presented annually since 1987 by the Australian Recording Industry Association (ARIA).

Year	Nominee / work	Award	Result	Ref.
1998	"Now Until the Break of Day"	Best Video (directed by Baz Luhrmann)	Won	
2002	Handel: Arias	Best Classical Album	Nominated	
2009	You'll Never Walk Alone (with Teddy Tahu Rhodes)	Best Classical Album	Nominated	
2010	Enchanted Way	Best Classical Album	Nominated	

=== Mo Awards ===
The Australian Entertainment Mo Awards (commonly known informally as the Mo Awards), were annual Australian entertainment industry awards. They recognise achievements in live entertainment in Australia from 1975 to 2016.

Year	Nominee / work	Award	Result (wins only)
1993	David Hobson	Operatic Performance of the Year	Won

=== Other awards and nominations ===
- The Handel Society International Recording Prize Nomination ~ Handel Arias 2003
- AFI (Australian Film Institute), APRA (Australian Performing Rights Association), Inside Film Awards Nominations, and the Film Critics Circle of Australia Award for Best Music Score, One Perfect Day 2004
