= Come My Way (Christine Anu album) =

Studio album by Christine Anu
- Released: 11 September 2000
- Recorded: 1999–2000
- Genre: Pop, dance-pop, alternative pop
- Length: 47:58
- Label: Mushroom
- Producer: Stuart Crichton

Christine Anu chronology
Stylin' Up (1995)	Come My Way (2000)	45 Degrees (2003)

Singles from Come My Way
- 1. "Sunshine on a Rainy Day" Released: May 2000; 2. "Jump to Love" Released: September 2000; 3. "Jump to Love" (reissue) / "Island Home (Earth Beat)" Released: November 2000; 4. "'Coz I'm Free" Released: April 2001

Come My Way is the second studio album by Australian singer Christine Anu. It was her first studio album in five years, after releasing her debut album Stylin' Up in 1995. The album peaked at number 18 in October 2000, becoming Anu's highest-charting album. The album was certified gold in 2000

At the ARIA Music Awards of 2001, the album was nominated for two awards; Best Pop Release and Best Female Artist but lost out on both to Light Years by Kylie Minogue.

Come My Way received warm reviews, with Steve Rendle of The Evening Post calling it "a great pop record" and "magic". He also noted that "Anu's voice is a sparkling joy."

== Track listing ==
Come My Way track listing
No.	Title	Writer(s)	Length
1.	"Soul Chant" (featuring Djakapurra)	Christine Anu	1:07
2.	"Celebrate" (featuring Djakapurra)	Anu, Stuart Crichton	4:14
3.	"Sunshine on a Rainy Day"	Martin Glover	3:47
4.	"'Coz I'm Free"	Anu, Crichton, Andy White	3:56
5.	"Fire & Water (Take Me Down)"	Anu	4:00
6.	"Jump to Love"	Paul Kelly, Anu, Crichton	3:57
7.	"Beat of Your Heart"	Kelly	3:58
8.	"I Hear You Call"	Anu, Crichton	3:59
9.	"Change Your Mind"	Anu, Crichton	3:31
10.	"Understand"	Anu, Crichton, White	3:28
11.	"Mother's Child"	Anu	4:51
12.	"Soul Chant (Reprise)" (featuring Djakapurra)	Anu	3:28
13.	"Island Home (Earth Beat)"	Neil Murray	3:49

== Charts ==
Chart performance for Come My Way
Chart (2000)	Peak position
Australian Albums (ARIA)	18

== Certifications ==
Certifications for Come My Way
Region	Certification	Certified units/sales
Australia (ARIA)	Gold	35,000^{^}
^{^} Shipments figures based on certification alone.
