= Sunshine on a Rainy Day =

1990 single by Zoë

Single by Zoë

from the album Scarlet Red and Blue
- B-side: 1990: "Sunshine on a Rainy Day" (a cappella); 1991: "Sunshine on a Rainy Day" (original)
- Released: October 1990
- Genre: Pop
- Length: 4:17
- Label: M&G; Polydor
- Songwriters: Martin Glover; Zoë Pollock
- Producer: Youth

Zoë singles chronology
"Sunshine on a Rainy Day" (1990)	"Sunshine on a Rainy Day" (remix) (1991)

Audio videos
- "Sunshine on a Rainy Day" on YouTube; "Sunshine on a Rainy Day" (1991 remix) on YouTube

"Sunshine on a Rainy Day" is a song by British pop singer and songwriter Zoë, released by M&G and Polydor Records as the first single from her debut album, Scarlet Red and Blue (1991). The song, written by Zoë and Youth, received positive reviews from music critics, reaching number four on the UK Singles Chart in September 1991. It also charted within the top 40 in Ireland, Israel, Luxembourg, Sweden and Zimbabwe, where it reached number-one. Three different music videos were produced to promote the single, one of them filmed in India and another for the US market. The success of "Sunshine on a Rainy Day" earned Zoë a nomination at the Brit Awards 1992 in the category for British Female Solo Artist. In 2008, she re-recorded the song with her folk band Mama. This version is available on their debut CD, Crow Coyote Buffalo.

== Background ==
The song was originally released in October 1990, when it reached number 53 on the UK Singles Chart. The following year, English record producer Mark 'Spike' Stent remixed the track and re-released it on 12 August 1991. This version reached number four on the same chart and became Zoë's biggest hit. It was the 18th best-selling single of 1991. The track was used in UK advertisements for the Amiga 500 computer, which added to its popularity. It was also on Capital Radio's A-list.

== Critical reception ==
Larry Flick from Billboard magazine wrote, "Photogenic British lass steps from out of left field with a percussive, midtempo gem on which she often comes across like a smoky Sophie B. Hawkins. Soft, syncopated hip-hop-derived beats support acoustic strumming, subtle electric chords, and flower-child lyrical prose. Track starts from a simple, sparse point, and builds to a rousing tambourine-shaking climax. Fueled with multiformat appeal." Randy Clark from Cashbox described it as a "brooding club track". James Hamilton from Music Week named it Pick of the Week in the category of Dance, calling it a "'Tom's Diner' inspired hypnotic folksy singalong roller, a real "sleeper" last autumn, now slightly remixed."

Jack Barron from NME wrote, "'Sunshine on a Rainy Day' is an excellent anthem in every way being musically and lyrically direct. The tune builds from an acoustic beginning layering more guitars and harmonies into a fairy cake of a song. Written by Zoe and Youth and mixed by Andy and Ben Boilerhouse, it is touched with spirit and heart giving every indication on this tune that Zoe is destined to become a very bright star indeed." Another NME editor felt the song is "a must for this summer" and "a certain Top 10 in the current climate". Sophie Lawrence reviewed the song for Smash Hits, commenting, "It's a bit Belinda Carlisle-ish." She added, "I love it. It's really folky. She's got a brilliant voice. That's a record I'd definitely go out and buy." Another Smash Hits editor, Mark Frith, stated that "Sunshine on a Rainy Day" has become "an anthem of unparalleled exuberance". In 2012, the Official UK Chart named it a "pop gem" and inducted the song into its "Pop Gem Hall of Fame".

== Track listings ==
- 7-inch single (1990)

A. "Sunshine on a Rainy Day" (7-inch version)
B. "Sunshine on a Rainy Day" (a cappella mix)

- CD single (1990)
1. "Sunshine on a Rainy Day" (7-inch version)
2. "Sunshine on a Rainy Day" (mellow mix)
3. "Sunshine on a Rainy Day" (a cappella mix)
- 7-inch and cassette single (1991)
1. "Sunshine on a Rainy Day" (7-inch radio mix 1991)
2. "Sunshine on a Rainy Day" (original 7-inch mix 1990)

== Charts ==
=== Weekly charts ===
Chart (1990)	Peak position
UK Singles (Official Charts)	53

Chart (1991)	Peak position
Australia (ARIA)	147
Europe (Eurochart Hot 100)	16
Europe (European Hit Radio)	26
Ireland (IRMA)	9
Israel (Israeli Singles Chart)	23
Luxembourg (Radio Luxembourg)	1
Sweden (Sverigetopplistan)	40
UK Singles (Official Charts)	4
UK Airplay (Music Week)	4
UK Dance (Music Week)	6
UK Club Chart (Record Mirror)	84
Zimbabwe (ZIMA)	1

=== Year-end charts ===
Chart (1991)	Position
UK Singles (OCC)	18

== Release history ==
Region	Date	Format(s)	Label(s)	Ref.
United Kingdom	October 1990	—N/a	M&G; Polydor	
Australia	18 February 1991	7-inch vinyl; cassette	M&G; Polydor	
Australia	13 May 1991	12-inch vinyl	M&G; Polydor	
United Kingdom (re-release)	12 August 1991	7-inch vinyl; 12-inch vinyl; CD; cassette	M&G; Polydor	
Japan	26 February 1992	Mini-CD	Polydor	

== Christine Anu version ==
"Sunshine on a Rainy Day"

Single by Christine Anu

from the album Come My Way
- Released: May 2000
- Genre: Pop
- Length: 3:50
- Label: Mushroom
- Songwriters: Martin Glover; Zoë Pollock
- Producer: Stuart Crichton

Christine Anu singles chronology
"Now Until the Break of Day" (1997)	"Sunshine on a Rainy Day" (2000)	"Jump to Love" (2000)

Music video
- "Sunshine on a Rainy Day" on YouTube

In May 2000, Australian singer-songwriter Christine Anu released a version of the song as the first single from her second studio album, Come My Way. The song peaked at number 26 on the Australian Singles Chart and remained in the top 50 for 15 weeks.

=== Track listing ===
- Australian CD single
1. "Sunshine on a Rainy Day" (radio mix)
2. "Sunshine on a Rainy Day" (Wicked Beat Sound System mix)
3. "Sunshine on a Rainy Day" (Scotia Nostre mix)

=== Charts ===
Chart (2000)	Peak position
Australia (ARIA)	26

== Other versions ==
- In 1994, Naomi Campbell covered the song on her album, Babywoman.
- The song was covered by Emma Bunton on her debut solo album A Girl Like Me in 2001. She later performed it at Capital FM's Party in the Park that year.
- A version by dance artists Ed Real & Mark Richardson was released in 2003 on Nukleuz Records.
- Happy hardcore versions include "Sunshine" by Slipmatt and Eruption, and "Sunshine on a Rainy Day" by DJ Stompy.
