= Talk About Love? (Christine Anu song) =

- CD single cover

Single by Christine Anu

from the album 45 Degrees
- B-side: "remixes"
- Released: 20 October 2003
- Genre: Pop, funk, pop rock
- Length: 3:30
- Label: Festival Mushroom
- Songwriter: J.Rogers/Gary Pinto/S.Mackay
- Producer: Jarrad Rogers

Christine Anu singles chronology
"'Coz I'm Free" (2001)	"Talk About Love?" (2003)	"Chrissy's Island Family" (2007)

Audio video
- "Talk About Love?" on YouTube

"Talk About Love?" is a song recorded by Christine Anu. It was released in October 2003 as the first and only single from her third studio album, 45 Degrees (2003). The song peaked at number 85 on the ARIA Charts.

== Content ==
Lyrically, the song sees Anu confront someone who believes they know about love, without evidence:

"You talk about love / But I can't see any love coming out of your mind
You talk about truth / But you don't seem to know what the truth is all about
You talk about me / Tell me what you've done to make that come about
Talk to me about something real, baby / Can you hear me now?"

== Track listing ==
CD single/Digital download (021522)

1. "Talk About Love?" – 3:30
2. "Talk About Love?" (Jarrad Rogers and Tony Espie Remix) – 3:19
3. "Talk About Love?" (instrumental) – 3:30

== Charts ==
Chart (2003)	Peak position
Australia (ARIA)	85
