= M&G Records =

British record label

M&G Records was a record label founded by Michael Levy after he sold his previous label Magnet Records in 1988 to WEA for an estimated £10 million.

== History ==
After Magnet was sold and was then merged into Eastwest Records in the UK, Levy set up M&G Records with backing from Polygram. The name "M&G Records" was derived from the initials of both Levy's first name and that of his wife Gilda. M&G was sold in October 1997 for an undisclosed sum and folded into the main Polydor Records label. Its most successful act was "Sunshine on a Rainy Day" singer Zoe. Other acts included Little Axe, Jai, Raw Stylus, and "Fair Blows the Wind for France" band Pele.
