= Jump to Love =

2000 song performed by Christine Anu

- CD single cover

Single by Christine Anu

from the album Come My Way
- A-side: "Jump to Love"
- Released: September 2000
- Recorded: Megaphon Studios, Sydney, 2000
- Genre: Pop
- Length: 3:59
- Label: Mushroom Records
- Songwriters: Paul Kelly, Christine Anu, Stuart Crichton
- Producer: Stuart Crichton

Christine Anu singles chronology
"Sunshine on a Rainy Day" (2000)	"Jump to Love" (2000)	"Jump to Love" / "Island Home (Earth Beat)" (2000)

Music video
- "Jump to Love" on YouTube

"Jump to Love" is a song recorded by Christine Anu. It was released in September 2000 as the second single from her second studio album, Come My Way (2000). The song peaked at number 58 and remained in the top 100 for 16 weeks.

A second, limited-edition version was released in November 2000, a double A-side with "Island Home (Earth Beat)", following Anu's performance of the latter at the closing ceremony of the 2000 Summer Olympics in Sydney on 1 October.

== Track listings ==
CD single 1 (MUSH019592)

1. "Jump to Love" - 3:59
2. "Come My Way" - 3:38
3. "Jump to Love" (L'more Remix) - 7:22
4. "Jump to Love" (Propaganda Klann Remix) - 4:27

CD single 2 (MUSH019962)

1. "Jump to Love (Radio Urban Mix)" - 3:34
2. "Come My Way" - 3:38
3. "Jump to Love" - 3:59
4. "Island Home"(Earth Beat) - 3:48

== Charts ==
Chart (2000–2001)	Peak position
Australia (ARIA)	58
