= Stylin' Up =

Studio album by Christine Anu
- Released: 1 May 1995
- Genre: Pop
- Length: 44:30
- Label: White Label Records, Mushroom
- Producer: David Bridie

Christine Anu chronology
Stylin' Up (1995)	Come My Way (2000)

Singles from Stylin' Up
- 1. "Monkey and the Turtle" Released: 3 October 1994; 2. "Island Home" Released: 23 January 1995; 3. "Party" Released: 5 June 1995; 4. "Come On" Released: 23 October 1995

Stylin' Up is the debut album by Australian singer Christine Anu, released on 1 May 1995 by Mushroom Records. A deluxe edition was later released with six live tracks. The album was certified platinum in 2000.

The album fuses a blend of pure, up-beat pop with "Party" as well as the more traditional "Monkey and the Turtle". Upon release she told triple j’s Angela Catterns "Hopefully my album sales are going to go up and Indigenous artists are going to get more radio play, more recognition, that sort of stuff.”

At the ARIA Music Awards of 1995, the album was nominated for four awards, winning 'Best Indigenous Release'

In 2015, Anu celebrated the album's 20th anniversary by releasing a live recording titled ReStylin' Up 20 Years.

== Critical reception ==
Professional ratings
Review scores
Source	Rating
AllMusic	3/5 stars

Don Snowden from AllMusic said: "Stylin' Up is an intriguing disc that makes clear Anu lines up far closer to Neneh Cherry's tough, positive assertion of female identity than any kind of fabricated ethnic exotic spice girl, but there's a sketchiness to some material that leaves it uneven and sometimes frustrating."

== Track listing ==
All songs composed by Christine Anu and David Bridie except where noted.

1. "Wanem Time" (Neil Murray) – 2:49
2. "Island Home" (Murray) – 4:12
3. "San E Wireless" – (Anu, Nelson) 3:32
4. "Monkey and the Turtle" – 3:59
5. "Come On" – 3:37
6. "Rain" (Anu, Bridie, Steve Hadley, Nelson) – 2:32
7. "Party" – 3:14
8. "Tama Oma" – 2:04
9. "Dive" – 4:07
10. "Stylin' Up" (Anu, Bridie, Peter Luscombe) – 2:45
11. "Photograph" – 3:52
12. "Love That Heals" (Murray) – 4:35
13. "Sik O" (Bridie, Traditional) – 3:12

Bonus disc

1. "Wanem Time" – 3:04
2. "Kulba Yaday" – 3:43
3. "Sailing Song" – 2:01
4. "Last Train" – 4:41
5. "Keep Up" – 3:40
6. "Love That Heals" – 4:48
- Bonus disc recorded live at the Metro in Sydney on 29 July 1995.

== Charts ==
=== Weekly charts ===
Chart (1995)	Peak position
Australian Albums (ARIA)	21

=== Year-end charts ===
Chart (1995)	Position
Australian Albums Chart	97

== Certifications ==
Region	Certification	Certified units/sales
Australia (ARIA)	Platinum	70,000^{^}
^{^} Shipments figures based on certification alone.
