= Christine Anu =

Australian pop singer and actress (born 1970)

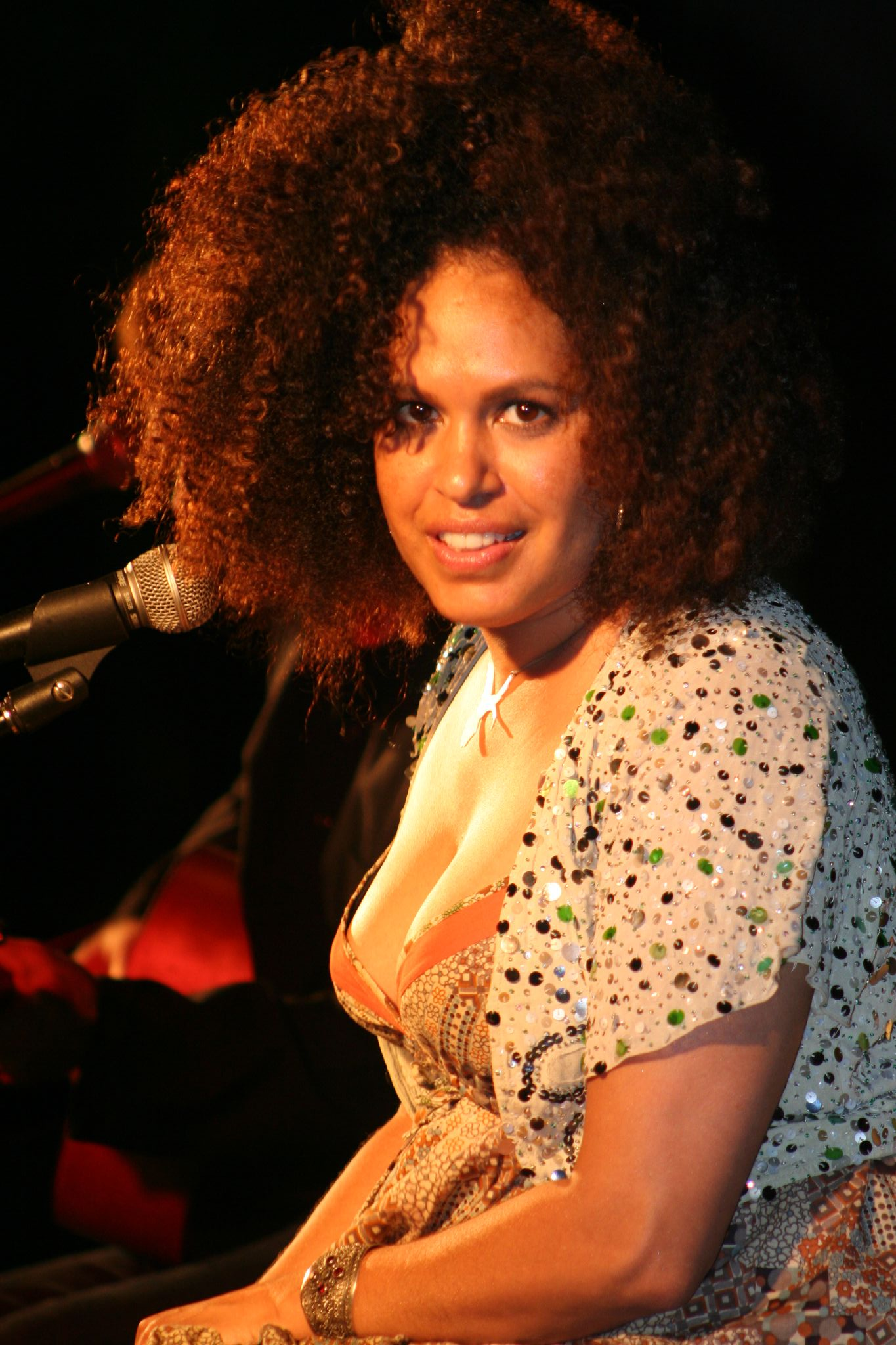
- Anu in 2007

Background information
- Born: Maia Christine Anu; 15 March 1970 (age 56); Cairns, Queensland, Australia
- Origin: Torres Strait Islands, Queensland, Australia
- Genre: Pop
- Occupations: Singer; songwriter; actress
- Instrument: Vocals
- Years active: 1987–present
- Labels: Mushroom Records; Liberation Music; ABC Music; Independent; Social Family Records
- Website: christineanu.com

Maia Christine Anu (born on 15 March 1970) is an Australian singer-songwriter and actress of Torres Strait Islander origin. She gained popularity with the cover song release of the Warumpi Band's song "My Island Home" in 1995. Anu has been nominated for many ARIA Awards, winning several, as well as five Deadly Awards, among others. In August 2024 she released a new album and single of the same name, Waku: Minaral a Minalay.

She started her career as a dancer, and has had an acting career in film, stage (including musical theatre), and television, as well as hosting the Weekend Evenings radio show on ABC Radio.

== Early life and education ==
Maia Christine Anu, was born in Cairns, Queensland, on 15 March 1970. She did not know who her biological father was, and grew up with her Torres Strait Islander mother and stepfather all over Queensland. Her mother is from Saibai Island, and her stepfather was a respected songman on Saibai, originally from Mabuiag Island. He sang traditional songs of the islands, and encouraged family singalongs. He died in 1979 when Christine was 10 years old.

Anu attended Emmaus College in Rockhampton, from which she graduated in 1987. Dancing being her first love, she moved to inner-city Sydney to study at the National Aboriginal and Islander Skills Development Association (later known as NAISDA Dance College), which had been established by Carole Johnson. She earned an Associate degree in dance in 1992.

== Career ==
=== Music ===
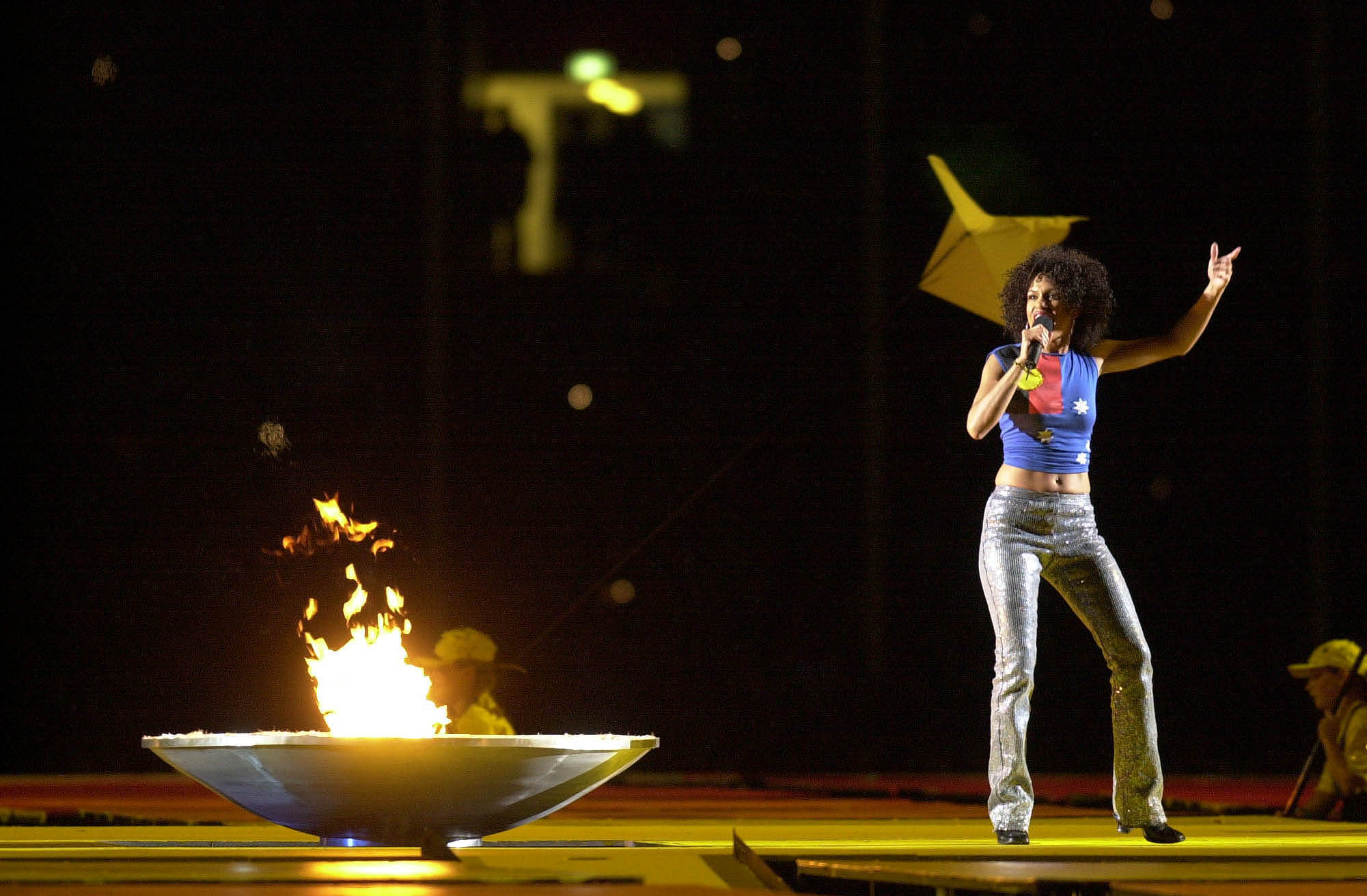
Anu performs at the 2000 Summer Paralympics opening ceremony

Anu began performing as a dancer while at college, and became a member of the Bangarra Dance Theatre and the Aboriginal Islander Dance Theatre troupes. She toured with Bangarra in 1992 and 1993.

She went on to sing back-up vocals for the Rainmakers, which included Neil Murray, formerly founder-member of the Warumpi Band, for a year. Her first recording was in 1993 with "Last Train", a dance remake of a Paul Kelly song. The follow-up, "Monkey and the Turtle", was based on a traditional nursery rhyme from the Torres Strait Islands.

In 1995, Neil Murray won an Australasian Performing Right Association songwriting award for writing "My Island Home". Anu covered the song, which gained immediate popularity, causing her to be remembered as the principal singer of the song. She released her first album, Stylin' Up, which went platinum, in 1995.

"Come On" was released as the fourth and final single from Stylin' Up. The song peaked at number 94 in Australia on the ARIA Charts. At the ARIA Music Awards of 1996 the song won two of three awards for which it was nominated, including Best Female Artist and Best Indigenous Release. In that year she also won a Deadly Award for best female artist.

Baz Luhrmann asked her to sing on the song "Now Until the Break of Day" on his 1997 album Something for Everybody album. It was released as a single, with the video winning another ARIA award in 1999, and led to her being cast in Moulin Rouge!.

In January 1998, Anu teamed up with Archie Roach, Paul Kelly, Judith Durham, Renee Geyer, Kutcha Edwards and Tiddas and formed Singers for the Red Black and Gold. Together they released a cover of "Yil Lull". In that year, she won the Female Artist of The Year Deadly Award.

In 2000, Anu released Come My Way which peaked at number 18 on the ARIA albums chart and went gold. She released the hit single "Sunshine on a Rainy Day", for which she won the ARIA Awards for both Best Female Artist and Engineer of the Year. In the same year, she sang the song "My Island Home" at the Sydney 2000 Olympics Closing Ceremony.

In 2003, Anu released her third studio album, 45 Degrees, and in 2005 released Acoustically. In that year, she was again winner of the Deadly Award for Female Artist of the Year, and in 2004 she won Single of the Year for "Talk About Love".

In February and March 2007, Anu toured New South Wales with a new stage show, Black is Blue, singing the songs of blues legends such as Billie Holiday, Nina Simone, Marlene Cummins, and Ella Fitzgerald. Also that year she toured a children's show and released an associate album titled Chrissy's Island Family. The album gained an ARIA Award nomination.

On 26 September 2010, she released a new single, "Come Home", but it was not successful. In 2012 she released the album Rewind: The Aretha Franklin Songbook.

On 7 November 2014, Anu released a Christmas album, titled Island Christmas, and the following year released ReStylin' Up 20 Years.

In March 2018, Anu released a duet version of "Without You" from the musical Rent with Greg Gould. The lyric video featured photography from around the world, each photo with a splash of red for HIV/AIDS support and awareness.

Through 2023, Anu worked on her first album since 2015's live ReStylin' Up 20 Years. The project is using German ethnomusicologist Wolfgang Laade's recordings of Anu's grandfather, Nadi Anu, which are held by the Australian Institute Of Aboriginal And Torres Strait Islander Studies. The resulting album, Waku: Minaral a Minalay, was released on 2 August 2024. Her daughter, Zipporah, wrote one of the songs on the album.

=== Acting ===
Anu has had an acting career in film, stage (including musical theatre), and television.

She appeared in Dating the Enemy, a 1996 Australian film starring Guy Pearce and Claudia Karvan. She has also hosted children's television programme Play School.

Anu appeared in an Australian production of the stage musical Little Shop of Horrors, and her stage career developed with a starring role as Mimi in the original Australian production of Rent in 1998 and 1999, which played to glowing reviews. Anu was offered a role in a Broadway production of this musical but had to decline due to commitments in recording her second album.

She had parts in the films Moulin Rouge! (2001) and The Matrix Reloaded (2003) as Kali. She also played Kali on the video game Enter the Matrix.

From October 2004 through 2005, she toured Australia in Intimate and Deadly, a cabaret-style stage show based on her life. The show opened at Kabarett Voltaire in the Seymour Centre in Sydney, and toured to Melbourne.

In 2012 she played the lead role of Australian sci-fi television series Outland, about a gay sci-fi fan club. Anu plays wheelchair-using Rae, the sole female member of the group.

On the 21 October 2024, it was announced she would be playing the role of Hermes in the touring Australian production of Hadestown.

=== Other TV ===
In 2004, she became a judge on Popstars Live, a television quest broadcast on the Seven Network at 6.30 pm on Sunday night in Australia along the lines of Australian Idol. The program failed to achieve a similar level of success, leading network executives to pressure the judges to offer harsher criticism of the contestants. Anu refused to offer harsher criticism, saying that she wished to be a role model, leading to her resignation as a judge in April 2004.

In 2009, Anu participated in Who Do You Think You Are.

In August 2020, Anu was revealed to be "the Goldfish" in the second season of The Masked Singer Australia and was the third contestant unmasked, placing 10th overall.

Anu also performed "Waltzing Matilda" at the 2003 AFL Grand Final and performed at the 2024 AFL Grand Final.

=== Radio ===
In December 2015, ABC announced that Anu would host the Evenings radio program on ABC Radio Sydney, ABC Radio Canberra and ABC Local Radio stations across New South Wales. Anu shared the role with Dominic Knight, then took over full-time in April 2016 after Knight's resignation. In the first half of 2016 the program suffered a dip in the ratings after she began hosting. In November 2016, ABC announced a national Evenings program on Friday and Saturday across ABC Local Radio, hosted by Anu. Chris Bath replaced Anu as host of Evenings from Monday to Thursday on ABC Radio Sydney, ABC Radio Canberra and ABC Local Radio stations across New South Wales.

After a break, Anu restarted presenting Weekend Evenings in January 2023. As of February 2025, Anu presents Weekend Evenings on Friday, Saturday and Sunday evenings, along with Sirine Demachkie.

== Personal life ==
Anu is a mother of a son, Kuiam, and daughter, Zipporah Corser Anu. Zipporah's father is actor Rodger Corser, and she is also musically talented.

Anu married her childhood sweetheart, Simon Deutrom, in 2010. He is not the father of either of her children. In June 2016, Anu announced that she and Deutrom were separating after six years of marriage, and they later divorced.

She revealed in 2012 that she had struggled with weight gain, after suffering from depression, and appeared on the Nine Network's reality show Excess Baggage. After her separation from Deutrom, she lost 25 kg (55 lb).

In February 2020, Anu pleaded guilty in the Rockhampton Magistrates Court to mid-range drunk driving, after having been pulled over by police in Rockhampton on New Year's Eve. She was fined A$650 and had her driver's license suspended for three months.

== Discography ==
=== Studio albums ===
- Stylin' Up (1995)
- Come My Way (2000)
- 45 Degrees (2003)
- Acoustically (2005)
- Chrissy's Island Family (2007)
- Rewind: The Aretha Franklin Songbook (2012)
- Island Christmas (2014)
- Waku: Minaral a Minalay (2024)

=== Live albums ===
- Intimate and Deadly (2010)
- ReStylin' Up 20 Years (2015)

== Filmography ==
=== Films and television ===
List of films and television shows featuring Christine Anu
Year	Title	Role	Notes
1996	Dating the Enemy		Minor role, first feature film
1998	Wildside		TV guest appearance
2000	It's a Wiggly Wiggly World	Herself	The Wiggles video and album
2001	Moulin Rouge!	Dancer	
2003	The Matrix Reloaded	Kali	Also lent voice to video game Enter the Matrix
2004	Popstars Live	Judge	
2004	Play School		
2005	The Alice	Valerie	Episodes 1.11 and 1.13
2005	Blinky Bill's White Christmas		
2007	East West 101	Fiona Baker	Episode "Death at the Station"
2007	Toasted TV		
2009	Who Do You Think You Are?	Herself	Episode "Christine Anu" aired 18 October 2009
2012	Outland	Rae	Lead role
2012	Excess Baggage	Herself	Celebrity contestant
2013	Dance Academy	Summer	Episode "Travelling Light"
2015	Ready for This	Vee	
2017	Kiki and Kitty	Mum	5 episodes
2018-2020	Black Comedy	Herself	4 episodes
2020	The Masked Singer (Australia)	Goldfish	Contestant (10th Place)

=== Theatre and stage performances ===
The following list includes selected stage performances by Anu.

List of theatre shows featuring Christine Anu
Year	Title	Role	Notes
1994	Bad Boy Johnny and the Prophets of Doom		Stage musical
1996-97	Little Shop of Horrors	Crystal	David Atkins musical
1998–99	Rent	Mimi	Stage musical
2002-03	Kissing Frogs		
2010	The Sapphires		
2011	Rainbow's End	Gladys Banks	Stage play. 2009 Parramatta production and 2011 national tour.
2013	South Pacific	Bloody Mary	Stage musical
2014	Parramatta Girls		Stage play
2016	Hairspray	Motormouth Maybelle	Arena production
2025	Hadestown	Mrs. Hermes	Stage musical

== Awards and nominations ==
At the 2025 NAIDOC Awards Anu was presented with the Creative Talent Award.

=== ARIA Awards ===
The ARIA Music Awards are a set of annual ceremonies presented by Australian Recording Industry Association (ARIA), which recognise excellence, innovation, and achievement across all genres of the music of Australia. They commenced in 1987. ARIA Awards won by Anu include:

Year	Award	Work	Result
1994	Best Video	"Last Train"	Nominated
1994	Breakthrough Artist – Single	"Last Train"	Nominated
1995	Best Indigenous Release	Stylin' Up	Won
1995	Breakthrough Artist – Album	Stylin' Up	Nominated
1995	Best Female Artist	Stylin' Up	Nominated
1995	Album of the Year	Stylin' Up	Nominated
1995	Song of the Year	"Island Home"	Nominated
1996	Best Indigenous Release	"Come On"	Won
1996	Best Pop Release	"Come On"	Nominated
1996	Best Female Artist	"Come On"	Won
1998	Best Video (director Baz Luhrmann)	"Now Until the Break of Day"	Won
2000	Engineer of the Year	"Sunshine on a Rainy Day"	Won
2000	Best Female Artist	"Sunshine on a Rainy Day"	Nominated
2001	Best Pop Release	Come My Way	Nominated
2001	Best Female Artist	Come My Way	Nominated
2007	Best Children's Album	Chrissy's Island Family	Nominated
2015	Best World Music Album	Island Christmas	Nominated
2024	Best World Music Album	Waku: Minaral a Minalay	Nominated

=== Australian Women in Music Awards ===
The Australian Women in Music Awards is an annual event that celebrates outstanding women in the Australian Music Industry who have made significant and lasting contributions in their chosen field. They commenced in 2018.

Year	Nominee / work	Award	Result
2019	Christine Anu	Diversity in Music Award	Won
2019	Christine Anu	Artistic Excellence Award	Won

=== Deadly Awards ===
The Deadly Awards, (commonly known simply as The Deadlys), was an annual celebration of Australian Aboriginal and Torres Strait Islander achievement in music, sport, entertainment and community. They ran from 1996 to 2013.

Year	Nominee / work	Award	Result
1996	Herself	Female Artist of the Year	Won
1998	Herself	Female Artist of the Year	Won
2000	"Sunshine on a Rainy Day"	Single of the Year	Won
2003	Herself	Female Artist of the Year	Won
2004	"Talk About Love"	Single of the Year	Won

=== Green Room Awards ===
Year	Award	Work	Result
1999	Best Female Actor in a Leading Roles (Music Theatre)	Rent	Won

=== National Indigenous Music Awards ===
The National Indigenous Music Awards is an annual awards ceremony that recognises the achievements of Indigenous Australians in music.

Year	Nominee / work	Award	Result	Ref.
2024	"Waku: Minaral a Minalay"	Song of the Year	Nominated	

=== Queensland Music Awards ===
The Queensland Music Awards (previously known as Q Song Awards) are annual awards celebrating Queensland, Australia's emerging artists. They commenced in 2006.

Year	Nominee / work	Award	Result	Ref.
2025	herself	Lifetime Achievement Award	awarded	
