= List of Vogue Australia cover models =

This list of Vogue Australia cover models (1959–present) is a catalog of cover models who have appeared on the cover of Vogue Australia, the Australian edition of American fashion magazine Vogue. Between 1952 and 1959, British Vogue published a supplement for Australia.

== 1950s ==
=== 1959 ===
Issue	Cover model	Photographer
Spring/Summer	Tania Mallet	Norman Parkinson
Mid-Summer		Norman Parkinson

== 1960s ==
=== 1960 ===
Issue	Cover model	Photographer
Autumn	Nancy Egerton	Eugene Vernier
Winter		Lord Snowden
Spring		Henry Clarke
Summer		Helmut Newton

=== 1961 ===
Issue	Cover model	Photographer/Illustrator
Autumn	Maggie Tabberer	Helmut Newton
Early Winter		Henry Clarke
Mid-Winter	—N/a	Patrick Russell
Summer		
Christmas		

=== 1962 ===
Issue	Cover model	Photographer
Early Winter	Margo McKendry	Laurence de Guay
Winter		
Spring	Maggi Eckardt	
Summer	Maggi Eckardt	Dieter Muller
Christmas	Maggi Eckardt	Dieter Muller

=== 1963 ===
Issue	Cover model	Photographer
March		Geoffrey Lee
April/May		
June/July	Jean Shrimpton	
August/September		
October		Michael Gilles
November/December	Jean Shrimpton	David Bailey

=== 1964 ===
Issue	Cover model	Photographer
March	Rosalie Wattel	David Franklin
April/May		Ernest Stead
June/July		Helmut Newton
August/September	Jean Shrimpton	David Bailey
October		
November		David Franklin
December/January 1965	Camilla Sparv	Helmut Newton

=== 1965 ===
Issue	Cover model	Photographer
March		
April/May		
June/July	Brigitte Bauer	Irving Penn
August	Kecia Nyman	Irving Penn
September		
October		
November	Jennifer O'Neill	Irving Penn
December/January 1966	Brigitte Bauer	Irving Penn

=== 1966 ===
Issue	Cover model	Photographer
March		
April/May	Brigitte Bauer	Irving Penn
June/July	Elsebeth Nielsen	Jon Waddy
August	Elsebeth Nielsen	Jon Waddy
September		Jon Waddy
October		
November	Elsebeth Nielsen	Jon Waddy
December/January 1967	Birgitta af Klerker	Bert Stern

=== 1967 ===
Issue	Cover model	Photographer
March	Celia Hammond	Jon Waddy
April/May	Tilly Tizzani	
June/July	Marisa Berenson	Irving Penn
August	Evelyn Kuhn	Francesco Scavullo
September		
October	Liz Ford	Jon Waddy
November	Lauren Hutton	Irving Penn
December/January 1968	Liz Ford	Jon Waddy

=== 1968 ===
Issue	Cover model	Photographer
March		Jon Waddy
April/May		Jon Waddy
June/July	Veruschka	Juno Gemes
August	Sue Murray	David Bailey
September	Daniela Bianchi	Dieter Muller
October	Elsebeth Nielsen	Jon Waddy
November	Lauren Hutton	Irving Penn
December/January 1969	Windsor Elliot	Armaud de Rosnay

=== 1969 ===
Issue	Cover model	Photographer
February	Daniela Bianchi	
March	Windsor Elliot	Gianni Penati
April	Lauren Hutton	Irving Penn
May	Elsebeth Nielsen	
June/July	Patricia Dow	
August		
September		David Hewison
October		Peter Caine
November	Patricia Dow	
December/January 1970	Veruschka	

== 1970s ==
=== 1970 ===
Issue	Cover model	Photographer
February	Elsebeth Nielsen	
March	Patricia Dow	
April		
May		
June/July	Annabella Pearson-Gee	
August	Lauren Hutton	
September	Annabella Pearson-Gee	Warren Scott
October		
November		
December/January 1971		

=== 1971 ===
Issue	Cover model	Photographer
February		
March		
April	Lynn Sutherland	Warren Scott
May	Therese Bohlin	Irving Penn
June/July	Esther de Deo, uncredited man	David Franklin
August	Ingrid Boulting	David Franklin
September		David Franklin
October	Daisy Boissevain	David Hewison
November		Jon Waddy
December/January 1972		David Hewison

=== 1972 ===
Issue	Cover model	Photographer
February	Esther de Deo	David Hewison
March		David Hewison
April		Jon Waddy
May		John Ashenhurst
June/July		
August		
September		Patrick Russell
October		Patrick Russell
November		
December/January 1973		John Ashenhurst

=== 1973 ===
Issue	Cover model	Photographer/Illustrator
February	Eva Malmström	Patrick Russell
March		Patrick Russell
April		
May		
June/July		Ashenhurst
August	Ursula Hufnagl	Patrick Russell
September		Nick Brokensha
October		
November		Nick Brokensha
December/January 1974	—N/a	Barry Zaid

=== 1974 ===
Issue	Cover model	Photographer
February	Apollonia van Ravenstein	
March	Eva Malmström	
April		Patrick Russell
May		
June/July	Jill Goodall	Gordon Munro
August		Patrick Russell
September		
September		
October		Peter Caine
November		
December/January 1975		Paul Harris

=== 1975 ===
Issue	Cover model	Photographer
February		Patrick Russell
March	Trish Doolan	Patrick Russell
April		Patrick Russell
May		
June/July	Sue Smithers	Patrick Russell
August		
September	Sue Smithers	Brett Hilder
October	Jane Oehr	Warren Scott
November		Dieter Muller
December/January 1976		Leon Lecash

=== 1976 ===
Issue	Cover model	Photographer
February		
March	Barbara Miller	Richard Dunkley
April		
May	Barbara Miller	Patrick Russell
June/July	Barbara Miller	Richard Dunkley
August	Sarah de Teliga	Patrick Russell
September		
September		
October		
November		
December/January 1977		Patrick Russell

=== 1977 ===
Issue	Cover model	Photographer
February		Patrick Russell
March	Lyndall Meredith	Dominique Longheon
April		Patrick Russell
May		Patrick Russell
June/July		Patrick Russell
August		Patrick Russell
September		
October		Patrick Russell
November		Patrick Russell
December/January 1978		

=== 1978 ===
Issue	Cover model	Photographer
January		
February		Patrick Russell
March		Patrick Russell
April		Norman Parkinson
May	Bridget Cornish	Patrick Russell
June/July		Patrick Russell
August		Patrick Russell
September		Patrick Russell
October		Patrick Russell
November		Ross Honeysett
December	Arja Toyryla	Patrick Russell

=== 1979 ===
Issue	Cover model	Photographer/Illustrator
January		
February		Patrick Russell
March	—N/a	Patrick Russell
April		Patrick Russell
May	Camilla More	
June		
July	Janet Dailey	Patrick Russell
August		Monte Cloes
September		Patrick Russell
October		Claude Mougin
November		Patrick Russell
December		Peter Arthur

== 1980s ==
=== 1980 ===
Issue	Cover model	Photographer
January	Valentine Monnier	
February		Greg Barrett
March	Robyn Galwey	Brett Hilder
April	Suzanne van Rees	
May	Robyn Galwey	Patrick Russell
June	Isabella Cowan	Patrick Russell
July	Isabella Cowan	Patrick Russell
August	Jane Buckland	Patrick Russell
September	Tempe Brickhill	Patrick Russell
October		
November	Jane Buckland	Patrick Russell
December		Alexander S. Vethers

=== 1981 ===
Issue	Cover model	Photographer
January	Annabelle James	Patrick Russell
February	Deidre McGuire	Patrick Russell
March	Leslie Winer	Patrick Russell
April	Tempe Brickhill	Patrick Russell
May	Isabella Cowan	Patrick Russell
June		
July	Barbara Neumann	
August	Barbara Neumann	
September	Jane Howe	
October	Jane Evans	Patrick Russell
November		Michael O'Brien
December		Sharyn Storrier

=== 1982 ===
Issue	Cover model	Photographer
January		
February		
March	Leslie Winer	Patrick Russell
April		Sepp Horvath
May	Isabella Cowan	Patrick Russell
June	Carol Schwarz	Sepp Horvath
July		
August	Melanie Gale	
September	Carole Jackson	Patrick Russell
October	Anki	Monty Coles
November	Kathy Coulter	
December		Ken Done

=== 1983 ===
Issue	Cover model	Photographer
January	Megan	
February	Megan	
March	Cheri La Roque	
April	Cheri La Roque	
May	Jenny Lough	Richard Bailey
June	Kirsteen Price	
July		George Seper
August	Jennie Clavin	Patrick Russell
September	Liddie Holt	Patrick Russell
October	Isabella Cowan	Patrick Russell
November	Lindsey Thurlow	
December	—N/a	

=== 1984 ===
Issue	Cover model	Photographer
January	Michelle Eabry	Patrick Russell
February	Carole Jackson	Patrick Russell
March	Lara Young	Herb Ritts
April	Bridget Adams	Patrick Russell
May	Lisa Rutledge	Alvarez
June	Sara-Jane	Patrick Russell
July	Caroline Batiste	
August	Carole Jackson	Patrick Russell
September	Virginia De Medonca	Richard Bailey
October	Hunter Reno	Richard Bailey
November	Karin Lund	
December		Michel Comte

=== 1985 ===
Issue	Cover model	Photographer
January	Annette Karlsson	Michel Comte
February	Virginia Wark	Brian Morris
March	Annette Karlsson	Michel Comte
April	Nathalie Gabrielli	Michel Comte
May	Carole Jackson	
June	Cindy Waite	Michel Comte
July	Linda Lyon	Richard Bailey
August	Isabella Rossellini	Michel Comte
September	Alexa Singer	
October	Alexa Singer	
November	Alexa Singer	Monty Coles
December		

=== 1986 ===
Issue	Cover model	Photographer
January	Lauren Helm	
February	Meighan Leibert Williams	
March	Gillian Mather Bailey	Monty Coles
April	Jennie Clavin	Monty Coles
May	Gillian Mather Bailey	
June		Monty Coles
July	Gillian Mather Bailey	
August	Bente	Michel Comte
September	Kelly Anderson	Monty Coles
October	Victoria Kennedy	Michel Comte
November	Wanda Weltman	Barry McKinley
December		Monty Coles

=== 1987 ===
Issue	Cover model	Photographer
January	Toni Elford	
February	Christy Turlington	
March	Katja Souverein	Grant Matthews
April	Monika Schnarre	Thierry des Fontaines
May	Christy Turlington	
June	Suzanne Lanza	
July	Curran Fahan	Grant Matthews
August	Estelle Lefébure	Thierry des Fontaines
September	Cindy Crawford	
October	Lauren Lindbergh	Monty Coles
November	Lauren Lindbergh	
December	Monica Gripman	

=== 1988 ===
Issue	Cover model	Photographer
January	Sarah Webb & Jeffrey Brezovar	
February	Monika Schnarre	
March	Rachel Hunter	Robert Erdmann
April	Hunter Reno	Robert Erdmann
May	Janette Williams	Robert Erdmann
June	Helle Grimmer	
July	Tatjana Patitz	
August	Tara Krahn	Monty Coles
September	Marielle McVille	
October	Jana Rajlich	Graham Shearer
November	Tania Trory	Graham Shearer
December	Lauren Lindbergh	Graham Shearer

=== 1989 ===
Issue	Cover model	Photographer
January	Hilde Jenssen	Graham Shearer
February	Kylie Gray	
March	Paulina Porizkova	
April	Kylie Gray	
May	Ruve Watts	
June	Niki Travers	Monty Cloes
July	Jenny Hayman	
August	Robyn Mackintosh	
September	Jenny Hayman	Graham Shearer
October	Elle MacPherson	Graham Shearer
November	Jenny Hayman	Graham Shearer
December	Tanya Eggers	

== 1990s ==
=== 1990 ===
Issue	Cover model	Photographer
January	Indra	Monty Cloes
February	Francesca Bonicoli	Graham Shearer
March	Carol Schwarz	Graham Shearer
April	Kylie Gray	Martyn Shearer
May	Susie Bick	Graham Shearer
June	Lana Ogilvie	Anthony Gordon
July	Cindy Crawford	Wayne Maser
August	Christy Turlington	Herb Ritts
September	Virginia Graham	Monty Coles
October	Rachel Hunter	Graham Shearer
November	Jane Campbell	Patric Shaw; Christina Zimpei
December	Lauren Lindbergh	Graham Shearer

=== 1991 ===
Issue	Cover model	Photographer
January	Serena Rojas	Graham Shearer
February	Jennifer Kroll	Patric Shaw
March	Claudia Schiffer	Patrick Demarchelier
April	Anneliese Seubert	Richard Bailey
May	Catherine Jenkins	Anthony Horth
June	Jenny Hayman	Richard Bailey
July	Shayna Roberts	Richard Bailey
August		Anthony Horn
September	Daniela Peštová	Paul Lange
October	Daniela Peštová	Paul Lange
November	Eugenia	Graham Shearer
December	Greta Scacchi	Patrick Russell

=== 1992 ===
Issue	Cover model	Photographer
January	Niki Taylor	Paul Lange
February	Johanna Rhodes	Anthony Horn
March	Joanna Rhodes	Graham Shearer
April	Johanna Rhodes	Anthony Horn
May	Regina Katz	Patrik Andersson
June	Liskula Cohen	Graham Shearer
July	Rachel Boss	Grant Matthews
August	Laura Weaver	
September	Elaine Irwin	Graham Shearer
October	Cindy Crawford	Paul Lange
November	Vera Cox	
December	Claudia Schiffer	Walter Chin

=== 1993 ===
Issue	Cover model	Photographer
January	Niki Taylor	Paul Lange
February	Beckie Brown	Donna DeMari
March	Mandy Cameron	Anthony Horth
April	Sarah Murdoch	Graham Shearer
May	Lucie de la Falaise	Hans Feurer
June	Sarah Murdoch	Graham Shearer
July	Amber Valletta	Paul Lange
August	Jaime Rishar; Emma Balfour; Kate Dillon Levin	Grant Matthews
September	Elaine George	Grant Good
October	Linda Evangelista	Pascal Chevallier
November	Tziporah Malkah	Grant Matthews
December	Jenny Brunt	Paul Lange

=== 1994 ===
Issue	Cover model	Photographer
January	Nicole Kidman	Rocky Schenck
February	Carolina Parsons	Lindsey Jones
March	Mandy Cameron	Don Flood
April	Sarah Murdoch	Grant Matthews
May	Susana Giménez	Ben Watts
June	Sarah Murdoch	Grant Matthews
July	Daniela Peštová	Richard Bailey
August	Melissa Billingsly	Nicholas Samartis
September	Meghan Douglas	Richard Bailey
October	Jaime Rishar	Michael Thompson
November	Rosita Parsons	Graham Shearer
December	Yasmeen Ghauri	Richard Bailey

=== 1995 ===
Issue	Cover model	Photographer
January	Kristy Hinze	Grant Matthews
February	Adele McLain	Richard Bailey
March	Elle MacPherson	Andrew Macpherson
April	Kristy Hinze	Richard Bailey
May	Sarah Murdoch	Nicholas Samartis
June	Kate James	Grant Matthews
July	Kym K	Richard Bailey
August	Nicole Maddox Grayson	Stephen Callaghan
September	Kimberley Davies	Richard Bailey
October	Daniela Peštová	Richard Bailey
November	Daniela Peštová	Joshua Jordan
December	Chloe Maxwell	Richard Bailey

=== 1996 ===
Issue	Cover model	Photographer
January	Valeria Mazza	Inez & Vinoodh
February	Stephanie Seymour	Inez & Vinoodh
March	Sarah Murdoch	Richard Bailey
April	Karen Ferrari	Paul Empson
May	Toni Collette	François Dischinger
June	Charlotte Dodds	Russell James
July	Sarah Murdoch	Julian Broad
August	Danielle Ferguson	Nicholas Samartis
September	Linda Evangelista	Mark Abrahams
October	Christy Turlington	Regan Cameron
November	Kylie Bax	Derek Henderson
December	Madonna	Steven Meisel

=== 1997 ===
Issue	Cover model	Photographer
January	Beri Smither	James Houston
February	Nicole Kidman	Firooz Zahedi
March	Tziporah Malkah	Richard Bailey
April	Cecilia Chancellor	Richard Bailey
May	Tatjana Patitz	Marco Sacchi
June	Naomi Campbell	Peter Lindbergh
July	Chrystèle Saint-Louis Augustin	Richard Bailey
August	Kylie Bax	Darren Keith
September	Chandra North	Darren Keith
October	Sarah Murdoch	Darren Keith
November	Elle MacPherson	Andrew MacPherson
December	Kate Moss	Mark Abrahams

=== 1998 ===
Issue	Cover model	Photographer
January	Tziporah Malkah	Darren Keith
February	Chandra North	Judson Baker
March	Sara Standring	Nicholas Semartis
April	Kirsty Hume	Mark Abrahams
May	Sarah Murdoch	James Houston
June	Esther Cañadas	Donald McPherson
July	Beri Smither	Darren Keith
August	Natalie Imbruglia	Alex Cayley
September	Lisa Seiffert & Alyssa Sutherland	James Houston
October	Inés Sastre	Robin Derrick
November	Angela Lindvall	Bruce Weber
December	Simone van Baal	Diego Uchitel

=== 1999 ===
Issue	Cover model	Photographer
January	Aurélie Claudel	Donald McPherson
February	Pat Rafter; Lara Feltham	
March	Diane Kruger	Darren Keith
April	Amber Valletta	Karin Catt
May	Cate Blanchett	James Houston
June	Kristy Hinze	
July	Natalie Portman	Andrew Southam
August	Nicole Kidman	Steven Meisel
September	Kylie Minogue; Elle MacPherson	Wayne Maser
October	Carolyn Murphy	Steven Meisel
November	Gwyneth Paltrow	Steven Meisel
December	Alyssa Sutherland	Richard Bailey

== 2000s ==
=== 2000 ===
Issue	Cover model	Photographer
January	Milla Jovovich	Patric Shaw
February	Elsa Benítez	Tony Notarberardino
March	Gisele Bündchen	Michael Thompson
April	Rachel Roberts	Richard Bailey
May	Carmen Kass	Michael Thompson
June	Ana Cláudia Michels	Tony Notarberardino
July	Jaime Rishar	Richard Bailey
August	Hilary Swank	Richard Bailey
September	Amanda Moore	Tony Notarberardino
October	Christine Anu	Richard Bailey
November	Trish Goff	Regan Cameron
December	Kirstie Penn	David Gubert

=== 2001 ===
Issue	Cover model	Photographer
January	Nicole Kidman	Annie Leibovitz
February	Lisa Ratliffe	Hiroshi Kutomi
March	Karolína Kurková	Elaine Constantine
April	Haylynn Cohen	Tony Notarberardino
May	Cate Blanchett	Tony Notarberardino
June	Kate Moss	Mario Testino
July	Karolína Kurková	Steven Meisel
August	Małgosia Bela	Steven Meisel
September	Stephanie Seymour	Patric Shaw
October	Georgina Grenville	Todd Barry
November	Aurélie Claudel	Todd Barry
December	Michelle Alves	Todd Barry

=== 2002 ===
Issue	Cover model	Photographer
January	Carmen Kass	Mario Testino
February	Shirley Mallmann	
March	Fernanda Tavares	Todd Barry
April	Sarah Jessica Parker	Mario Testino
May	Carmen Kass	Mario Testino
June	Caroline Ribeiro	Todd Barry
July	Vivien Solari	
August	Georgina Grenville	
September	Natalie Imbruglia	Tony Notarberardino
October	Elle Macpherson	
November	Lizzy Jagger	Patric Shaw
December	Delfine Bafort	

=== 2003 ===
Issue	Cover model	Photographer
January	Christy Turlington	Steven Klein
February	Gwyneth Paltrow	Mario Testino
March	Nicole Kidman	Mario Testino
April	Veronika Vařeková	Walter Chin
May	Kylie Minogue	Simon Emmett
June	Holly Valance	Jonathan Bookallil
July	Liisa Winkler	Patric Shaw
August	Carolyn Murphy	Patric Shaw
September	Linda Vojtová	Patric Shaw
October	Rose Byrne	Richard Bailey
November	Carolyn Murphy	Patric Shaw
December	Eva Herzigová	Karl Lagerfeld

=== 2004 ===
Issue	Cover model	Photographer
January	Sophie Monk	Jason Capobianco
February	Gemma Ward	Justin Smith
March	Jennifer Aniston	Steven Meisel
April	Filippa Hamilton	Patric Shaw
May	Annika Dop	Jason Capobianco
June	Nicole Kidman	Irving Penn
July	Tiiu Kuik	
August	Nicole Trunfio	Justin Smith
September	Gemma Ward	Justin Smith
October	Natasha Poly	Thomas Nutzl
November	Gemma Ward	Troyt Coburn
December	Mary Elizabeth Donaldson	Regan Cameron

=== 2005 ===
Issue	Cover model	Photographer
January	Charlize Theron	Mario Testino
February	Naomi Watts	Tony Notarberardino
March	Mischa Barton	
April	Lauren Bush	
May	Luca Gadjus	
June	Rose Byrne	Robert Rosen
July	Karolína Kurková	Patrick Demarchelier
August	Anna Jagodzińska	Thomas Nützl
September	Elizabeth Hurley	Patrick Demarchelier
October	Nicole Kidman	Patrick Demarchelier
November	Daria Werbowy	Thomas Nützl
December	Gemma Ward	Patrick Demarchelier

=== 2006 ===
Issue	Cover model	Photographer
January	Cate Blanchett	Richard Bailey
February	Kate Moss	Mario Sorrenti
March	Sarah Murdoch	Hugh Stewart
April	Sienna Miller	Mario Testino
May	Erin Wasson	Nicole Bentley
June	Jennifer Aniston	Mario Testino
July	Mischa Barton	Troyt Coburn
August	Natalie Portman	Craig McDean
September	Keira Knightley	Mario Testino
October	Melissa George	Richard Bailey
November	Kate Bosworth	Michael Thompson
December	Kylie Minogue	William Baker

=== 2007 ===
Issue	Cover model	Photographer
January	Scarlett Johansson	Patrick Demarchelier
February	Cameron Diaz	Mert & Marcus
March	Angelina Jolie	Annie Leibovitz
April	Katie Braatvedt	Richard Bailey
May	Caroline Trentini	Patrick Demarchelier
June	Natalia Vodianova	Mario Testino
July	Kirsten Dunst	Craig McDean
August	Cate Blanchett	Richard Bailey
September	Alice Burdeu	Troyt Coburn
October	Gemma Ward	Patrick Demarchelier
November	Jessica Stam	Craig McDean
December	Kristy Hinze	Troyt Coburn

=== 2008 ===
Issue	Cover model	Photographer
January	Gisele Bündchen	Inez & Vinoodh
February	Jennifer Connelly	Mario Testino
March	Jessica Hart	Richard Bailey
April	Catherine McNeil	Richard Bailey
May	Sasha Pivovarova	Mario Sorrenti
June	Doutzen Kroes	Troyt Coburn
July	Alice Burdeu	Thomas Nutzl
August	Nicole Trunfio	Pascal Chevallier
September	Abbey Lee Kershaw	Max Doyle
October	Natasha Poly	Inez & Vinoodh
November	Catherine McNeil	Troyt Coburn
December	Lily Donaldson	Inez & Vinoodh

=== 2009 ===
Issue	Cover model	Photographer
January	Valerija Erokhina	Max Doyle
February	Daria Werbowy	Inez & Vinoodh
March	Abbey Lee Kershaw	Max Doyle
April	Anna Selezneva	Inez & Vinoodh
May	Rosie Tupper	Richard Freeman
June	Edita Vilkevičiūtė	Patrick Demarchelier
July	Myf Shepherd	Max Doyle
August	Kelsey Van Mook	Max Doyle
September	Cate Blanchett	David Downton
October	Anna Selezneva	Camilla Åkrans
November	Elyse Taylor	Max Doyle
December	Abbie Cornish	Max Doyle

== 2010s ==
=== 2010 ===
Issue	Cover model	Photographer
January	Catherine McNeil	Vincent Peters
February	Nicole Trunfio	Max Doyle
March	Abbey Lee Kershaw	Max Doyle
April	Rosie Tupper	Nicole Bentley
May	Elyse Taylor	Todd Barry
June	Samantha Harris	Nicole Bentley
July	Rose Byrne	Max Doyle
August	Cameron Diaz	Regan Cameron
September	Catherine McNeil	Max Doyle
October	Codie Young	Nicole Bentley
November	Abbey Lee Kershaw	Nicole Bentley
December	Georgia May Jagger	Kai Z. Feng

=== 2011 ===
Issue	Cover model	Photographer
January	Miranda Kerr	Carlotta Moye
February	Catherine McNeil	Max Doyle
March	Alina Baikova	Nicole Bentley
April	Anja Rubik	Max Doyle
May	Julia Nobis	Kai Z. Feng
June	Erin Wasson	Nicole Bentley
July	Gisele Bündchen	Patrick Demarchelier
August	Rachael Taylor	Nick Leary
September	Katie Fogarty	Kai Z. Feng
October	Arizona Muse	Kai Z. Feng
November	Alina Baikova	Nicole Bentley
December	Isabel Lucas	Max Doyle

=== 2012 ===
Issue	Cover model	Photographer
January	Karmen Pedaru	Cedric Buchet
February	Marloes Horst	Nicole Bentley
March	Karlie Kloss	Kai Z. Feng
April	Julia Frauche	Kai Z. Feng
May	Joan Smalls	Kai Z. Feng
June	Daria Werbowy	Daniel Jackson
July	Delta Goodrem	Nicole Bentley
August	Abbey Lee Kershaw	Nicole Bentley
September	Bella Heathcote	Will Davidson
October	Lana Del Rey	Nicole Bentley
November	Catherine McNeil	Benny Horne
December	Julia Nobis & Black Caviar	Benny Horne

=== 2013 ===
Issue	Cover model	Photographer
January	Carolyn Murphy	Regan Cameron
February	Naomi Watts	Will Davidson
March	Lara Stone	Angelo Pennetta
April	Miranda Kerr	Miguel Reveriego
May	Karlie Kloss	Arthur Elgort
June	Candice Swanepoel	Victor Demarchelier
July	Kate Moss	Patrick Demarchelier
August	Sofia Coppola	Paul Jasmin
September	Victoria Beckham	Boo George
October	Cara Delevingne	Benny Horne
November	Erica Packer	Steven Chee
December	Arizona Muse	Nathaniel Goldberg

=== 2014 ===
Issue	Cover model	Photographer
January	Jessica Hart	Will Davidson
February	Cate Blanchett	Steven Chee
March	Mia Wasikowska	Emma Summerton
April	Abbey Lee Kershaw	Gilles Bensimon
May	Kylie Minogue	Will Davidson
June	Emily DiDonato	Benny Horne
July	Miranda Kerr	Nicole Bentley
August	Sarah Murdoch	Steven Chee
September	Freja Beha Erichsen	Inez & Vinoodh
October	Catherine McNeil	Gilles Bensimon
November	Blake Lively	Mario Testino
December	Gemma Ward	Emma Summerton

=== 2015 ===
Issue	Cover model	Photographer
January	Gisele Bündchen	Patrick Demarchelier
February	Kim Kardashian	Gilles Bensimon
March	Margot Robbie	Alexi Lubomirski
April	Cate Blanchett	Emma Summerton
May	Abbey Lee Kershaw & Riley Keough	Nathaniel Goldberg
June	Gigi Hadid	Benny Horne
July	Lorde	Robbie Fimmano
August	Victoria Beckham	Patrick Demarchelier
September	Nicole Kidman	Will Davidson
October	Naomi Watts	Nathaniel Goldberg
November	Taylor Swift	Emma Summerton
December	Cate Blanchett	Will Davidson

=== 2016 ===
Issue	Cover model	Photographer
January	Gemma Ward	Lachlan Bailey
February	Jessica Alba	Patrick Demarchelier
March	Elle Fanning	Boo George
April	David Genat; Lara Stone; Jordan Stenmark; Zac Stenmark; Louis Stenmark	Mario Testino
May	Emilia Clarke	Emma Summerton
June	Kim Kardashian	Lachlan Bailey
July	Mia Wasikowska	Nicole Bentley
August	The Crown Prince & Princess of Denmark	Mario Testino
September	Selena Gomez	Emma Summerton
October	Kendall Jenner	Patrick Demarchelier
November	Victoria Beckham	Boo George
December	Julia Nobis	Daniel Jackson

=== 2017 ===
Issue	Cover model	Photographer
January	Nicole Kidman	Will Davidson
February	Amanda Seyfried	Emma Summerton
March	Cindy Crawford	Emma Summerton
April	Karlie Kloss	Benny Horne
May	Teresa Palmer	Nicole Bentley
June	Naomi Watts	Emma Summerton
July	Paris Jackson	Patrick Demarchelier
August	Bella Heathcote	Paolo Roversi
September	Jordan Barrett & Bella Hadid	Jackie Nickerson
October	Lorde	Nicole Bentley
November	Chris Hemsworth & Cate Blanchett	Will Davidson
December	Margot Robbie	Lachlan Bailey

=== 2018 ===
Issue	Cover model	Photographer
January	Carey Mulligan	Emma Summerton
February	Dakota Fanning	Emma Summerton
March	Emma Watson	Peter Lindbergh
April	Fernanda Ly; Akiima; Charlee Fraser; Andreja Pejić	Patrick Demarchelier
May	Kylie Minogue	Nicole Bentley
June	Rebel Wilson	Nicole Bentley
July	Gigi Hadid	Giampaolo Sgura
August	Katy Perry	Emma Summerton
September	Kylie Jenner	Jackie Nickerson
October	Dakota Johnson	Emma Summerton
November	Victoria Beckham	Bibi Cornejo Borthwick
December	Adut Akech	Charles Dennington

=== 2019 ===
Issue	Cover model	Photographer
January	Emily Ratajkowski	Nicole Bentley
February	Lily-Rose Depp	Giampaolo Sgura
March	Angourie Rice; Adut Akech; Amy Shark	Nicole Bentley
April	Natalie Portman	Emma Summerton
May	Rihanna	Josh Olins
June	Kendall Jenner	Charles Dennington
July	Billie Eilish	Jesse Lizotte
August	Arpad Flynn Busson; Elle MacPherson; Aurelius Cy Andrea Busson	Nicole Bentley
September	Margot Robbie	Mario Sorrenti
October	Hailey Bieber	Lachlan Bailey
November	Bella Hadid	Sam Haskins
December	Nicole Kidman	Inez and Vinoodh

== 2020s ==
=== 2020 ===
Issue	Cover model	Photographer
January	Adut Akech	Nathaniel Goldberg
February	Elsa Pataky	Benny Horne
March	Zendaya	Daniel Jackson
April	Dua Lipa	Charles Dennington
May	Carey Mulligan	Josh Olins
June/July	Elizabeth Jagger; Georgia May Jagger	Benny Horne
August	Adut Akech	Christine Centenera
October	Sia	Micaiah Carter
November	Katie Holmes	Bec Parsons
December	Awkwafina	Charles Dennington

=== 2021 ===
Issue	Cover model	Photographer
January	Naomi Watts	Carin Backoff
February	Amanda Seyfried	Lachlan Bailey
March	Gemma Ward Zinnia Kumar	Derek Henderson
April	Rosé	Peter Ash Lee
May	Erica Packer; Indigo Packer; Emmanuelle Sheelah Packer; Jackson Lloyd Packer	Williams + Hirikawa
June	Priyanka Chopra	Bibi Borthwick
July	Selena Gomez	ALIQUE
August	Billie Eilish	Emma Summerton
September	Magnolia Maymuru, Djarraran	Charles Dennington
October	Rita Ora	Ben Morris
November	Sarah Snook	Simon Eeles
December	Lily Collins	Ned Rogers

=== 2022 ===
Issue	Cover model	Photographer
January	Adut Akech	Charles Dennington
February	Kristen Stewart	Lachlan Bailey
March	Lorde	Alique
April	The Kid Laroi	Ned Rogers
May	Elaine George; Cindy Rostron; Charlee Fraser; Magnolia Maymuru	Jess James
June	Austin Butler; Olivia DeJonge	Lachlan Bailey
July	Victoria Beckham	Daniel Jackson
August	Miranda Kerr; Evan Spiegel	Isaac Brown
September	Emma Chamberlain	Ned Rogers
October	Anya Taylor-Joy	Jess Ruby James
November	Catherine McNeil	Jake Terrey
December	Elizabeth Debicki	Gregory Harris

=== 2023 ===
Issue	Cover model	Photographer
January	Hanan Ibrahim	Brett Clarke
February	Lyndon Watts; Manahou Macka; Georgia Harper; James Majoos; Basjia Almaan	Joe Brennan
March	Hailey Bieber	Daniel Jackson
April	Adut Akech; Bior Akech	Josh Olins
May	Riley Keough	Emma Summerton
June	Rita Ora, Taika Waititi	Robbie Fimmano
July	Lily-Rose Depp, Troye Sivan	Daniel Jackson
August	Margot Robbie	Mario Sorrenti
September	Tarlisa Gaykamangu	Robbie Fimmano
October	Kylie Minogue	Alique
November	Florence Pugh	Lachlan Bailey
December	Emily Ratajkowski	Lachlan Bailey

=== 2024 ===
Issue	Cover model	Photographer
January	Danielle, Hanni	Hyea W. Kang
February	Nicole Kidman	Steven Klein
March	Naomi Campbell	Casper Kofi
April	Angelina Kendall	Juergen Teller
May	Zendaya	Josh Olins
June	Anya Taylor-Joy	Josh Olins
July	Nina Kennedy, Emma McKeon, Chloe Covell, Mary Fowler, Torrie Lewis	Charles Dennington
August	Victoria Beckham	Daniel Jackson
September	Charli XCX	Amy Troost
October	Kate Winslet	Annemarieke van Drimmelen
November	Adut Akech	Jesse Lizotte
December	Miranda Kerr	Dan Martensen

=== 2025 ===
Issue	Cover model	Photographer
January	Margaret Qualley	Josh Olins
February	Troye Sivan	Jamie Heath
March	Anna Sawai	Taika Waititi
April	Sarah Snook	Jesse Lizotte
May	Natalie Portman	Lachlan Bailey
June	Lila Moss	Dario Catellani
July	Lorde	Daniel Jackson
August	Em Stenberg, Tatyana Perry, Latahlia Hickling	Darren McDonald
September	Abbey Lee	Daniel Jackson
October	Rose Byrne	Darren McDonald
November	Adut Akech, Kiki	Campbell Addy
December	Olivia Dean	Daniel Jackson

=== 2026 ===
Issue	Cover model	Photographer
January	Jakara Anthony	Edward Mulvihill
February	Margot Robbie, Jacob Elordi	Lachlan Bailey
March	Hailey Bieber	Luigi & Iango
April	Rosie Huntington-Whiteley	Lachlan Bailey
May	Anne Hathaway	Luigi & Iango
June	Milly Alcock	Lachlan Bailey
July	Hoyeon	Jamie Heath
August	Pamela Anderson	Jamie Heath
September	Kylie Minogue	Lachlan Bailey
October	Sophie Wilde	Jamie Heath
November	Nicole Kidman	Lachlan Bailey

== See also ==
- Elaine George, first Aboriginal model to appear on cover of Vogue Australia, September 1993.
