= Zinnia Kumar =

Australian model and scientist

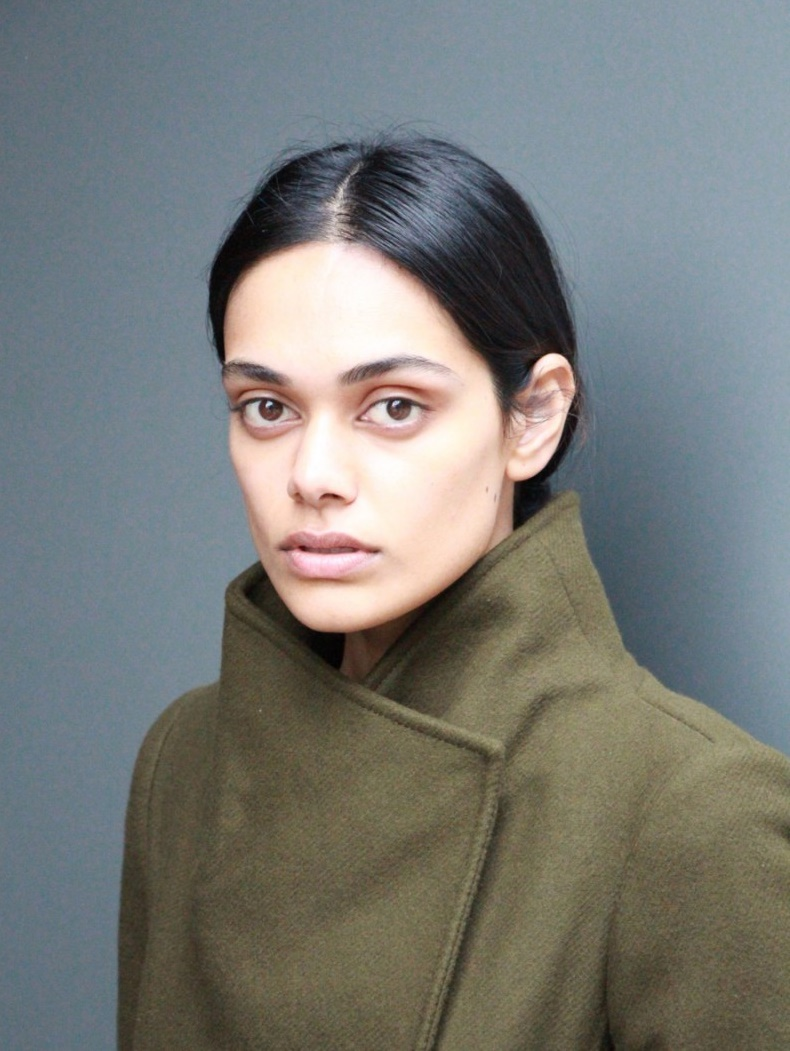
- Kumar in 2025
- Born: Zinnia Kumar; Sydney, Australia
- Education: University of New South Wales; University College London; Brasenose, Oxford
- Occupation: Model
- Modeling information
- Height: 1.75 m (5 ft 9 in)
- Hair color: Black
- Eye color: Brown

Zinnia Kumar is an Australian fashion model and scientist based in London. She has appeared on the covers of Vogue Australia, Vogue India, Harpers Bazaar Australia, Harpers Bazaar Arabia, Porter and Elle, and has walked for Dior, Jacquemus and Vivienne Westwood.

Before modelling, she trained in evolutionary psychology at University of New South Wales, where she was lead author of a study showing that judgements of attractiveness vary according to the rarity of particular traits. Published in Biology Letters, the research became associated with the concept known as "peak beard". She then studied for an MPhil at the University of Oxford as a member of Brasenose College, researching the role of attractiveness judgements in the disempowerment and abuse of women. She later completed an MSc in psychology at University College of London, focusing on positive behaviour change and motivation. Alongside modelling, her work centres on women's empowerment, including supporting women rebuilding their lives after domestic abuse.

== Career ==
=== Fashion modelling ===
Kumar has appeared on magazine covers for Vogue Australia, Harper's Bazaar, Vogue India, Russh, CAP74024, Love Want, More or Less and Porter which called her a 'Force of Nature'.

Kumar rose to prominence as the first South Asian Australian to feature on a cover of Vogue Australia in 62 years. Kumar was recognised in 2019 as one of "the 50 Most Influential Global Indians" by Vogue India.

Kumar has since 2019 featured in publications Russh, Interview Magazine, Another Magazine, British Vogue, Vogue China, Vogue Singapore, Vogue France, Vogue Italia, Vogue Germany, Vogue Korea, CAP74024, Vogue India, Vogue Australia, Harpers Bazaar (US), Harpers Bazaar Australia and walked shows for Dior, Jacquemus and Vivienne Westwood among others.

Noted for her sense of style, combining vintage and vamp aesthetics, Kumar has attended red carpets and sat front row at Miu Miu, Chanel, Rabanne, Victoria Beckham, Jacquemus, Mugler, Boss, Ellie Saab, Balenciaga, British Fashion Awards, the Nita Mukesh Ambani Cultural Centre opening and the Paris Opera Ballet charity gala. In 2022, Kumar created a viral sustainable red carpet moment for the British Fashion Awards, wearing an upcycled Yohji Yamamoto dress and sustainable diamonds from Chopard.

In film she has featured in Wonder Woman as an Amazonian warrior.

Kumar was first scouted as a model at a department store in Sydney, but did not secure representation with any Australian modelling agencies. She later moved to the United Kingdom to pursue her PhD studies. While in the UK, she was scouted again and subsequently signed with a modelling agency, marking the beginning of her professional career.

=== Evironmentalism ===
Zinnia's environmentalism work covers conservation, ecology, sustainability and fashion. Primarily communicating via keynotes and talks, podcasts, interviews, journalism and consulting with organisations. She has presented for G20, FIT NY, British Fashion Council, Vogue, Cancer Council, Australasian Evolution Society, Design Council, Australian Museum, The Australian, CFS+, Save Soil, Beth Israel Deaconess Medical Center (BIDMC), Harvard Medical School among others. Her talks have covered prevention of eco fatigue, eco-anxiety, sustainability meeting inclusion supporting organisational sustainable staff against burnout, sustainable innovation for change, green scepticism among others.

She presented, wrote, co-directed and produced a three part documentary series focussing on technological sustainable innovations in the fashion industry.

She is a field conservation ecologist accredited by the Chartered Institute of Ecology and Environmental Managers, and worked with Little Blue Penguins, invertebrates and wetland birds for organisations such as the New South Wales Environment Protection Authority, Birdlife and the Australian Department of Environment primarily in the Australian outback.

=== Beauty and diversity ===
Kumar's keynote talks and research has been published in scientific journals and featured on TV, talks and print journalism. She published research looking at negative frequency dependant selection on human attractiveness, researching men's beards and women's hair colour under the social condition of rarity; her research coined the cultural phenomenon of 'Peak beard'.

In 2020 Zinnia became a member of the Vogue Values Diversity Council after presenting a case to News Corp about how to increase representation and reach a wider audience. During her role as councillor she gave a keynote talk at Vogue Codes on the history of scientific racism shaping modern beauty ideals titled "The politics of beauty: Science, identity and representation in media". During her time at Vogue Australia's Diversity Council, the magazine published its first covers featuring the first dark skinned indigenous Australian, actress Magnolia Maymuru, the first Indian actress, Priyanka Chopra and the first Korean-Australian, singer Roseanne Park. In 2021 Zinnia was nominated by models.com as a Social Mover and Change Maker.

Zinnia has spoken about barriers for South Asian models. She has personally scouted South Asian models, which led her to co-found a boutique model management firm.

=== Women's empowerment ===
For her humanitarian work, empowering disadvantaged girls in Australia, India and Thailand through direct educational mentorship and motivation, she was awarded a Rotary Youth Leadership Award and was selected as a youth ambassador for the Australian Government, Department of Foreign Affairs.

Zinnia conducted research at the University of Oxford on the psychological, socio‑economic, and disempowering effects of colorism on women of Indian origin. She has discussed the implicit presence of colorism in beauty advertising and casting practices, noting its impact on mental health and economic opportunities.

For her social impact entrepreneurship, research and advocacy, Zinnia Kumar was invited to deliver the keynote special address at the G20 Empower conference in Gujarat, India in 2023. Zinnia spoke of the importance of female mentorship as an integral part of empowerment and belief building for disadvantaged girls.

== Personal life ==
Zinnia was born in Sydney, Australia and grew up in Sydney's south-western suburbs. She is a 5th generation immigrant and her family have lived in Oceania since 1879.

Zinnia is autistic (Asperger syndrome). She had severe social anxiety and over came it by training in speaking and presenting at the National Institute of Dramatic Art, she was a member of Toastmasters International (Public Speaking Society) for a decade and is a current member of The Oxford Union.

She attended a disadvantaged public high school and self learned her final year studies. Zinnia Kumar attended University of New South Wales for a Bachelor of Advanced Science, in Ecology and Human Evolutionary Biology with First Class honours, she matriculated at Brasenose College, Oxford University for an MPhil in Modern South Asian Studies, and holds an MSc in Industrial, Organisational and Business Psychology from University College London.

== Authored articles ==
- "Lust for Change". Russh. 3 March 2022.
- "Fairness Creams Continue To Amplify Light Skin Supremacy & Anti-Blackness". Homegrown India. 8 June 2021.
- "Belonging, discrimination and the importance of storytelling". Vogue Australia. 11 March 2021.
- "The difference between genuine and performative sustainability in fashion". Common Interest. 16 April 2021.
- "Holding Up A Mirror". Vogue Australia. 9 February 2021. Archived from the original on 30 June 2024.
- "Hope Springs: In conversation with Professor Sarah Gilbert". Vogue Australia. 13 December 2020. Archived from the original on 30 June 2024.
- "Jameela Jamil on body image, therapy and the patriarchy". The Australian. 22 November 2020. Archived from the original on 3 May 2024.
- "Negative frequency-dependent preferences and variation in male facial hair". Biology letters (Royal Society). 1 April 2014
- "Are Preferences for Women's Hair Color Frequency-Dependent?" Adaptive Human Behaviour and Physiology. 19 September 2014
