= Elaine George =

Australian model

- Born: 1976 (age 49–50); Queensland, Australia
- Other name: Elaine Tanaka
- Occupation: Model
- Known for: First Australian Aboriginal model featured on the cover of Vogue
- Children: 2

Elaine George (c. 1976), later known as Elaine Tanaka, is an Aboriginal Australian fashion model. She was the first Aboriginal model to appear on the cover of Vogue magazine, for the September 1993 edition of Vogue Australia.

== Early life ==
Elaine George was born around 1976 and brought up in a housing commission (a form of social housing) home in Inala, south-west of Brisbane, Queensland. Her mother is of Arakwal descent from the Bundjalung Nation, and her father (white) Australian of German ancestry. George's family was part of the Stolen Generations.

Growing up, George was a tomboy who liked sport, and her family, being poor, had never bought magazines. She was not allowed to wear make-up.

== First Vogue cover ==
George was photographed by photographer Grant Good, who spotted her at a theme park, Dreamworld, when she was taking her sister Anita out as a treat. He was there with his partner, Diana Finke, and their children. Finke followed George and her sister around the park, wanting to recruit her: however, due to a combination of not knowing Finke's intent and the significant racism against Indigenous people in Australia (particularly in the 1990s), George recalls that she was frightened of the white woman following her. She eventually decided to confront the woman and ask her to stop following them, at which point Finke gave her her contact details and discussed modelling.

Just a few days prior, Good had had a conversation with then editor of Vogue Australia, Nancy Pilcher, about not having featured enough Australian models on the cover. Good sent test shots of her to Pilcher, who decided to put George on the cover of the September 1993 issue of the magazine.

George was excited about being flown to Sydney for the shoot, having never been out of the state nor flown in a plane. She was just 17 years old at the time, and had been working as a secretary. Her Vogue cover appearance was her very first modelling job. George was the first Aboriginal model to appear on the cover of Vogue.

The next time an Aboriginal model would be featured on the magazine's cover was not until Samantha Harris in 2010, 17 years after George's cover issue. George commented, "I thought it was beautiful [but] I was a little disappointed it took 17 years".

According to former Vogue editor Kirstie Clements, the magazine received criticism for the fact that the already light-skinned George was blown out on the 1993 cover, appearing to have even lighter skin than she had.

== Further modelling during the 1990s ==
Following the Vogue cover, George quickly became widely recognised for her modelling and booked many more jobs over the course of the next two years, including multiple overseas jobs. At age 18, she moved to the United States to pursue her career.

While the Vogue cover led her to fame and further modelling jobs, George began to experience isolation and loneliness. She was not working alongside any other Indigenous people. She often found that makeup artists at her modelling jobs did not have makeup that matched her skin tone. As she travelled to other countries, many people she met did not know that Australia even had Indigenous peoples, instead believing that all Australians were "blonde-haired, blue-eyed" racially white people. George was not taught modelling skills such as walking or how to talk in interviews and meetings, and instead she "just went along with it". She was not also allowed to play sports, which she had previously enjoyed.

In 1995, she returned to Australia for a modelling and met the man who would eventually become the father of her children. She decided to retire from her modelling career to focus on other pursuits.

== Return to modelling and second Vogue cover ==
In 2021, after nearly three decades away from the runway, George made a return to modelling when she was asked to fill in for someone at a First Nations Fashion Design (FNFD) event that she had initially attended only as an ambassador. This led to her being asked to model at Sydney Fashion Week, and George started to become involved in modelling again. Some of the reasons she returned to modelling after the FNFD show were that she felt "the [fashion] industry is changing for the better," and that she has had positive experiences working with Indigenous fashion designers.

In 2022, George modelled for the cover of Vogue Australia for a second time, making her the first Aboriginal woman to grace the magazine's cover twice. She was featured on the cover of the May 2022 issue, alongside three fellow Indigenous women in modelling: Magnolia Maymuru, Charlee Fraser, and Cindy Rostron.

George continues to model part-time. Her daughter, Taylor, sometimes models alongside her.

== Other ventures ==
George has two children, one son and one daughter, and lives in Queensland. As of 2024, George works full-time as a child protection officer with Key Assets, a non-government not-for-profit organisation, which she has done for almost three decades. She has focused on ensuring that foster carers of Indigenous children keep them connected to their community and culture.

George appeared on an episode of the 2023 ABC TV series The Way We Wore, a show about Australian fashion.

In 2024, George was one of the judges for the National Indigenous Fashion Awards, and was one of the IMG's Changemakers at Australian Fashion Week. She is also on the board of FNFD, and is the Ambassador and Model Mentor for the "BlakList – Next Gen" program, mentoring young, up-and-coming Indigenous models.

== See also ==
- List of Vogue Australia cover models
