= Sheila Scotter =

Australian fashion businesswoman

Sheila Scotter AM, MBE
- Born: Calcutta, India
- Died: April 6, 2012 (aged 91)
- Occupation: Businessperson

Sheila Winifred Gordon Scotter, AM, MBE (2 December 1920 – 6 April 2012) was an Australian journalist, businesswoman, and fashion designer. Noted for her position as editor of the Vogue Australia magazine from 1962 to 1971. She also founded the Vogue Living magazine. She was famous for always wearing black and white clothing and leaving her hair silver. This earned her the nickname, the Silver Duchess. She was honoured for her journalism and her fundraising for opera.

== Biography ==
Sheila Scotter was born in Calcutta, India to parents Harold and Winifred. Harold was a former soldier who had fought alongside T. E. Lawrence and now worked for the Bengal railways. She had two brothers. From the age of 4 she boarded at St Swithun's School, Winchester, England, and saw her parents only once every four years, although she had more frequent contact with her grandparents.

After leaving school, Scotter entered the fashion world as a model, working for people such as Hardy Amies. She came to Australia in 1949, basing herself in Melbourne. She worked as a high fashion buyer, promotions director, and Director of Condé Nast Publications before becoming Editor-in-Chief of Vogue Living and Vogue Australia 1962-71.

She was known for her radio programs (Sheila Scotter's Letters from London on 3AW in the 1970s) and newspaper columns (235 instalments of Sheila Scotter Suggests in The Australian Women's Weekly 1975-80; columns in Melbourne Living from 1982). Her Bedside Cookbook was published in 1980. She was a panelist on the TV program Beauty and the Beast.

She was a member of the board of Opera Australia 1969-72, and the board of the Victoria State Opera 1980-83. Scotter was Foundation Vice-Chairman of the Victorian State Opera Foundation 1982-88, and Chairman of the Dame Joan Hammond Award 1988. She was considered a formidable fund raiser for artistic and other causes.

Her trademark was the black-and-white garments she always wore throughout her adult life. The only exception she ever made was when she was persuaded to wear red for an occasion where she was advised no other colour would be appropriate. It turned out to be a surprise 70th birthday party for her, at which all the guests wore black-and-white.

== Personal life ==
Sheila Scotter's two early marriages each lasted three years and ended in divorce. She married Geoffrey Batten-Pearce in London when she was 22 (he later had the marriage annulled), and Alan Ford McIntyre in Melbourne when she was 31 (he was granted the divorce on the grounds of refusal of conjugal rights and desertion).

She claimed to have had a 13-year affair with John Truscott. However, Truscott was at the very least bisexual: after his death it was alleged he had a poor reputation amongst Melbourne’s rent boys. Scotter’s 1998 memoir Sheila Scotter; Snaps, Stories and Secrets From My Life revealed a list of 24 other alleged former lovers, including Harold Holt, Sir Frank Packer (she was godmother to Packer's daughter Gretel), Sir Ian Potter, Sir Brian Murray, Sir Anthony Griffin, and Sir Robert Southey. Most of the men named had died before publication and had no opportunity to respond to the revelations.

She was engaged at one time to the actor Peter Pagan.

== Honours ==
Sheila Scotter was appointed a Member of the Order of the British Empire on 13 June 1970 in recognition of her services to journalism and commerce. She was appointed a Member of the Order of Australia on 8 June 1992 in recognition of her fundraising for the arts.

Scotter died, aged 91, in Albert Park, Melbourne on 6 April 2012. At her request, she was buried in the Dandenongs near Melbourne, next to her friend and former lover, John Truscott.
