= Alina Baikova =

Ukrainian model

- Born: 1989 (age 36–37); Kropyvnytskyi, Kirovohrad Oblast, Ukrainian SSR, Soviet Union
- Occupation: Model
- Modeling information
- Height: 1.80 m (5 ft 11 in)
- Hair color: Light brown
- Eye color: Blue
- Agency: Women 360 Management (New York); The Lab Models (Milan); Traffic Models (Barcelona)

Alina Baikova (Ukrainian: Аліна Байкова) is a Ukrainian fashion model and businesswoman.

== Biography ==
Baikova was born in Kropyvnytskyi, Kirovohrad Oblast. She came from an impoverished family and worked at a restaurant to earn money. On two occasions, she was approached about the idea of modeling, so she decided to pursue a career.

Baikova started her modeling career in China and France, at 17, where she modeled for Hermès, Dior, Giambattista Valli, Lanvin, Calvin Klein, Zuhair Murad, and Armani. She signed with Next Management in 2010, and debuted at Carolina Herrera, also walking for Marc Jacobs, Ralph Lauren, Isaac Mizrahi, John Galliano, Dolce & Gabbana, Salvatore Ferragamo, appeared in Interview, and opened the 2011 Dior show. She also appeared on the cover of Vogue Australia twice in 2011. Baikova has also walked for Zac Posen, and appeared in a fragrance advertisement for Oscar de la Renta.

In 2015, Baikova created an app that delivers personalized flower bouquets around Europe using flowers grown in Amsterdam, Netherlands.
