= Vogue Australia =

Australian fashion magazine

- Cover of the June/July 1968 issue, Veruschka by Juno Gemes
- Editor-in-Chief: Christine Centenera
- Categories: Fashion
- Frequency: Monthly
- Founder: Rosemary Cooper
- First issue: September 1959; 67 years ago
- Company: Condé Nast Publications (1959–1972); Bernard Leser Publications (1972–1989); Condé Nast Publications (1989–2002); Federal Publishing Company (2002–2006); News Corp (2006–present)
- Country: Australia
- Based in: Sydney
- Language: English
- Website: vogue.com.au

Vogue Australia (stylised in all caps) is an Australian monthly fashion magazine that covers ready-to-wear fashion, haute couture, popular culture, beauty, lifestyle, and weddings. Previously published by Condé Nast Asia Pacific, the magazine has been published and licensed under News Corp Australia since 2006. Since 2023, Christine Centenera has served as editor-in-chief, previous editors include Sheila Scotter, Marion Hume, and Kirstie Clements, among others.

Based in the Surry Hills neighbourhood of Sydney. Vogue Australia began publication in 1959 as the Australian edition of Vogue, following the launch of Vogue New Zealand (1957) and Vogue South Africa & Rhodesia (1958).

== Background ==
Vogue Australia is the Australian edition of the American fashion magazine Vogue. The magazine is published twelve times per year for January, February, March, April, May, June, July, August, September, October, November, and December.

=== Editors ===
Editor-in-Chief	Start year	End year	Ref.
Rosemary Cooper	1959	1961	
Joan Chesney Frost	1961	1962	
Sheila Scotter	1962	1971	
Eve Harman	1971	1976	
June McCallum	1976	1989	
Nancy Pilcher	1989	1997	
Marion Hume	1997	1998	
Juliet Ashworth	1998	1999	
Kirstie Clements	1999	2012	
Edwina McCann	2012	2023	
Christine Centenera	2023	present	

=== Other editions ===
- Vogue Living (1967–present)
- Vogue Apartments (1995–1999)
- Beauty in Vogue (1974–1975)
- Vogue Brides (2015–2019)
- Vogue Children / Vogue Kids (1970s; 1985–1987; 2001–2002)
- Vogue Entertaining Guide / Vogue Entertaining & Travel (1980–2014)
- Vogue Girl (2005)
- Vogue Australia in Mandarin Chinese (2017–2019)
- Men Vogue (1976–1977; 1980s–c.1998)
- Miss Vogue (2013–2014)
- Vogue Patterns (1992–1997)
- Vogue Real Life Guide (from 1985)

== History ==
=== Supplement-era and founding of Vogue Australia (1952–1961) ===
In 1952, Rosemary Cooper (editor of the British Vogue Export Book) visited Australia to oversee a showcase of British fashions at David Jones department store. Impressed by Australian interest in fashion, Cooper suggested the idea of an Australian supplement to British Vogue. Vogue Supplement for Australia was then launched in the same year, edited by Cooper. Cooper would go on to oversee other commonwealth supplements of Vogue for New Zealand, South Africa and Rhodesia.

With the Spring/Summer 1959 issue Vogue Supplement for Australia became an independent edition as Vogue Australia. This first issue featured Tania Mallet on the cover, photographed by Norman Parkinson. In 1960, Cooper returned to Australia to set up the magazine with a local editor and staff and in 1961 Joan Chesney Frost replaced Cooper as editor. Frost resigned in 1962.

=== Under Sheila Scotter (1962–1971) ===
Sheila Scotter was appointed as editor in July 1962. Scotter previously worked in buying and marketing for Myer, Georges, and Everglaze.

=== Post-Scotter years (1971–1996) ===
In 1971, Eve Harman (sister of Ilsa and John Konrads) replaced Sheila Scotter as editor-in-chief, Harman had worked for the magazine since 1961.

In 1972, Australian Vogue publisher Bernard Leser acquired the magazine from Condé Nast. Condé Nast took over the magazine once again in 1989.

By 1980 Vogue Australia had a similar circulation to Vogue Paris and Vogue Italia which both operated in larger markets than the Australian edition. Vogue Australia also had the highest sales compared to population of any Vogue worldwide.

=== Under Marion Hume and Juliet Ashworth (1997–1999) ===
Marion Hume was the magazine's editor for only an 18 month period, during this time the magazines circulation dropped and Hume was sacked and replaced.

In 1998 Juliet Ashworth was appointed editor-in-chief replacing Hume, previously editor-in-chief of Woman's Day her appointment was seen as Vogue Australia going downmarket in order to increase its declining circulation.

Ashworth's first cover featured Patrick Rafter and Lara Feltham.

=== Under Kirstie Clements (1999–2012) ===
Condé Nast pulled out of the Australian market in 2002, with this the magazine became licensed under the Federal Publishing Company. However in 2006 News Ltd. purchased Federal Publishing Companys magazines for $180 million (AUD) with this the magazine became part of News Ltd.

The magazine's December 2003 issue was guest-edited by fashion designer Karl Lagerfeld, this was the first magazine to be guest edited by Lagerfeld and featured Eva Herzigová on the cover.

For the December 2004 issue, Princess Mary of Denmark was photographed for the cover.

In May 2012 Clements was fired from her role as editor-in-chief of Vogue Australia.

=== Under Edwina McCann (2012–2023) ===
Vogue Australia celebrated its 60th anniversary issue in December 2019 with Edward Enninful and British Vogue.

=== Under Christine Centenera (2023–present) ===
Christine Centenera was appointed Editor-in-Chief of Vogue Australia in late 2022. Centenera previously worked as fashion director of Harper's Bazaar Australia and since 2012 had been fashion director of Vogue Australia.

Her first issue was March 2023 and featured Hailey Bieber on the magazines cover.

== Features ==
=== Indigenous Australian representation ===
Elaine George became the first Indigenous Australian model to feature on the cover of any edition of Vogue with her September 1993 Vogue Australia cover. Regarding her historic cover, George stated "I wanted to make sure I represented my people in the best way […] it was like bringing the rest of Australia on a journey. I had that opportunity to make way for the next young Aboriginal model". In June 2010, 17 years after George, Dunghutti model Samantha Harris became the second Indigenous Australian model to feature on the cover of Vogue Australia. This was followed by Awabakal model Charlee Frasers' cover in April 2018.

Vogue Australia has featured the work of Indigenous artists and designers. The 60th Anniversary issue in December 2019 featured Yolngu model Maminydjama (Magnolia) Maymuru and artist Maree Clarke, among others.

On the theme of "hope", for the September 2020 cover, during the COVID-19 pandemic in Australia, Vogue Australia worked with the National Gallery of Australia to commission artist Betty Muffler, an Aṉangu Pitjantjatjara woman and Ngangkaṟi (spiritual healer) from remote South Australia, to bring hope and healing with her artwork Ngangkari Ngura (Healing Country). Of the cover, Muffler said, "Through my paintings you can see my Ngangkari work: watching over people and also looking after Country. My Country. This place is very important – we all need to look after each other and respect our home".

=== Healthy body initiative ===
May 2013 marked the first anniversary of a healthy body initiative that was signed by the magazine's international editors—the initiative represents a commitment from the editors to promote positive body images within the content of Vogue's numerous editions. Vogue Australia editor Edwina McCann explained:

In the magazine we're moving away from those very young, very thin girls. A year down the track, we ask ourselves what can Vogue do about it? And an issue like this [June 2013 issue] is what we can do about it. If I was aware of a girl being ill on a photo shoot I wouldn't allow that shoot to go ahead, or if a girl had an eating disorder I would not shoot her.

The Australian edition's June 2013 issue was entitled Vogue Australia: "The Body Issue" and featured articles on exercise and nutrition, as well as a diverse range of models. New York-based Australian plus-size model Robyn Lawley, previously featured on the cover of Vogue Italia, also appeared in a swimwear shoot for the June issue.

Jonathan Newhouse, Condé Nast International chairman, stated that "Vogue editors around the world want the magazines to reflect their commitment to the health of the models who appear on the pages and the wellbeing of their readers." Alexandra Shulman, one of the magazine's editors, commented on the initiative by stating, "As one of the fashion industry's most powerful voices, Vogue has a unique opportunity to engage with relevant issues where we feel we can make a difference."

== Vogue Living ==
=== Vogue Living (1967–present) ===
Launched in 1967 originally as Vogue's Guide to Living. From 1970 it was published as Vogue Living. In 1999 the magazines circulation was increased from bi-monthly to monthly but it later returned to the bi-monthly schedule.

Editor-in-Chief	Start year	End year	Ref.
Patsy Alexiev			
Helen Hutcheon		1979	
Ilsa Konrads	1979	1984	
Juliet Ashworth	1998	1999	
David Clark	2003	2012	
Victoria Carey	2012	2014	
Neale Whitaker	2014	2017	
Rebecca Caratti	2018	present	

== See also ==
- List of Vogue Australia cover models
