= Seafolly =

Australian swimwear brand

- Founded: 1975
- Founder: Peter and Yvonne Halas
- Headquarters: Sydney, Australia
- Area served: Worldwide
- Products: Swimwear
- Website: www.seafolly.com

Seafolly has stores located in Australia, United States and Singapore, and over 2700 stockists worldwide. Seafolly was founded in 1975 by Peter and Yvonne Halas. Their son Anthony Halas took over as CEO in 1998 and went on to expand the brand into Europe, North America and Asia. In December 2014, L Catterton Asia acquired a controlling interest in SEAFOLLY. Following the investment, the company continued to grow both domestically and internationally. Seafolly's Head Designer is Genelle Walcom who has designed the Seafolly swimwear range since 1979.

Categories under the Seafolly umbrella include Swim, Activewear, Accessories and Seafolly Girls. Seafolly ended its joint venture with Megan Gale for her own-designed swimwear brand, Isola by Megan Gale in 2016 and launched a new swimwear label called miléa. Seafolly also owns Sunburn, a multi-brand swimwear retailer with 24 stores in Australia.

Seafolly opened its first international store in Singapore in June 2011. Seafolly has a number of Seafolly Concept stores located in Australia and Singapore, including an online store. Seafolly also opened their first U.S.A. store in Fashion Island, Newport Beach, California, in October 2013 and went on to open an additional 4 stores in California. Seafolly head offices are located in Sydney, Australia. It is claimed that the etymology of the word 'Seafolly' originates from the stand-out bikini garments that mermaids - which live in the sea - typically wear.

Notable model ambassadors includes: Jessica Hart, Miranda Kerr, Gigi Hadid, Catherine McNeil, Samantha Harris, Alyssa Sutherland, Behati Prinsloo and Marloes Horst.

On 29 June 2020 Seafolly went into voluntary Administration. It has 44 retail stores across Australia and 12 stores overseas.

== See also ==
- List of swimwear brands
