= Naminapu Maymuru-White =

Aboriginal Australian artist (born 1952)

- Born: 1952 (age 72–73); Djarrakpi, Arnhem Land, NT, Australia
- Father: Nanyin Maymuru
- Relatives: Narritjin Maymuru (uncle); Magnolia Maymuru (granddaughter)

Naminapu "Nami" Maymuru-White (born 1952) is a senior Yolŋu artist of North East Arnhem Land, in the Northern Territory of Australia. She is known for representing her the songlines of her clan, the Maŋgalili group, especially the stars and their reflections in the local rivers. She was invited to exhibit at the Venice Biennale in July 2024.

== Early life and education ==
Naminapu Maymuru-White was born in 1952 at Djarrakpi in North East Arnhem Land, Northern Territory, into the Maŋgalili clan of Yolŋu people (an Aboriginal Australian people of northern Australia). Mentored by her father Nänyin Maymuru (1918–1969) and his brother Narritjin Maymuru (1922–1982), both senior Maŋgalili artists and lawmen, she was one of the first Yolŋu women to be taught to paint miny'tji (sacred clan designs).

She attended the Yirrkala mission school, afterwards working in the mission store and craft shop and at the local bank. She became known as "Nami".

== Career ==
Maymuru-White moved with her family (husband and young children) to the homeland of Gurka'wuy after its establishment in 1973. There she worked as a teacher trainee, and afterwards trained as a teacher in Yirrkala.

Maymuru-White lived in Melbourne and Darwin for some time with her second husband. In 1985 she returned to live at Yirrkala, now a self-governed Indigenous community, with her family, and started teaching art at the local school.

She then began working at the craft shop attached to Buku-Larrŋgay Arts, and in 1990 was appointed curator of the newly-established art museum attached to the centre. She remained in this position until 1996.

== Art practice ==
As well as painting, Maymuru-White is skilled in carving, screen-printing, weaving, linocut, and batik.

Her earlier work consisted mainly of miny'tyi, but Maymuru-White developed her own original designs that also relate to her clan identity. Maymuru-White is especially known for her work illustrating the Yolŋu concept of Milŋiyawuy, an epic songline that connects terrestrial and spiritual themes. She paints on bark, larrakitj (memorial poles), and canvas, using a traditional fine brush made of human hair tied to a wooden skewer, called the marwat.

The Milŋiyawuy songline relates the story of two ancestral spirits known as Guwak who travelled from the Maŋgalili homeland (200 km (120 mi) south of Yirrkala, down the Milŋiya River. Upon reaching the mouth, their vessel capsized, and their spirits were transformed into stars, known to non-Indigenous people as the Milky Way.

Maymuru-White's Milky Way paintings are created using black and white stone and clay pigments, and comprise streams of stars. The connection between the earthly, space, and spiritual elements reflects the Maŋgalili view that there is no separation between them. It is meant to represent a journey after death to a place where people can feel comforted.

Her work was displayed at the National Gallery of Victoria (NGV) in 2021, where she presented her piece, Riŋgitjmi Gapu, further elaborating upon her conception of the Milŋiyawuy. The title roughly translates to "river of Heaven and Earth", and the work depicts the Milŋiyawuy river, also known as the Milky Way. Riŋgitjmi Gapu is a vinyl floor-based artwork placed directly in the entrance of the NGV, allowing the audience to walk across the stars which unite us all.

Another series entitled Milŋiyawuy (Milky Way), created in 2024, was acquired by the Tate Modern in London.

She sees an important part of her work as teaching young people their culture. Maymuru-White has travelled around Australia as well as to Japan for her work, but settled in Yirrkala, where she works at the Buku-Larrnggay Mulka Centre as of 2025.

== Recognition and awards ==
- 1996: Telstra National Aboriginal and Torres Strait Islander Art Award for "Best Work on Paper", for Nyapilingu
- 1998: Joint runner-up, National Indigenous Heritage Art Award, Normandy Art Award, for her bark Maŋgalili
- 2005: Wandjuk Marika 3D Memorial Award, for a Milŋiyawuy memorial poles

== Exhibitions and collections ==
Maymuru-White's work has often been included in group exhibitions both in Australia and internationally, and is represented in most Australian major institutional collections as well as several overseas ones.

=== Selected exhibitions ===
Her work was exhibited along with that of Bandak Marika, another woman artist from Yirrkala, at Warrnambool and Sydney in 1990.

In 2019 and 2020, the solo exhibitions, River of Stars at Salon Art Projects, Darwin, and Approximately Infinite Universe at The Cross Arts Projects in Sydney, sold out.

In February/March 2022 an exhibition of her work entitled Milŋiyawuy—The River of Heaven and Earth, was exhibited at Sullivan+Strumpf, a commercial gallery in Melbourne with whom she had established a business relationship.

In March 2024, Art Basel Hong Kong exhibited installations by Maymuru-White and Sydney Aboriginal/Pacific Islander artist Daniel Boyd.

Maymuru-White was invited to exhibit at the Venice Biennale in July 2024, as part of the first ever Indigenous Australian-led delegation. Along with several of her canvases, the work of Wadawurrung artist Marlene Gilson and Kamilaroi and Bigambul artist Archie Moore were exhibited at the Biennale. Maymuru-White was not at first keen on making the trip, but her 24-year-old grandson, musical artist and arts worker Ngalakan (Billy) Wanambi, encouraged her travelled with her, giving a welcome yidaki performance at the event.

=== Selected collections ===
Collections and galleries holding Maymuru-White's work include:

- Fondation Opale in Switzerland
- Kerry Stokes Collection (larrakitj)
- Kluge-Ruhe Museum, University of Virginia, US
- National Gallery of Victoria
- Tate Modern

== Personal life ==
Maymuru-White has three children by her first husband. All of her children were born in the hospital at Yirrkala, which was later converted into the Buku-Larrnggay Mulka Centre.

She later married Leon White, who was teaching in the Northern Territory, and lived in Melbourne and Darwin for several years before returning to Yirrkala in 1985.

Her son, Rrawun, is a founding member of the band East Journey, and his daughter, Magnolia, was the first Indigenous Australian woman to represent the Northern Territory in the Miss World Australia pageant in July 2016.

She is also the grandmother of Ngalakan Billy Waṉambi, lead singer of the band King Stingray.
