= David Mitchell (New Zealand poet) =

New Zealand poet (1940–2011)

- Born: 10 January 1940; Wellington, New Zealand
- Died: 21 June 2011 (aged 71); Sydney, Australia
- Occupations: Poet; teacher
- Notable work: Pipe Dreams in Ponsonby (1972)
- Spouse: Elsebeth Nielsen (after 1963)
- Children: 2

David Mitchell (10 January 1940 – 21 June 2011) was a New Zealand poet, teacher and cricketer. In the 1960s and 1970s he was a well-known performance poet in New Zealand, and in 1980 he founded the weekly event "Poetry Live" which continues to run in Auckland as of 2025. His iconic poetry collection Pipe Dreams in Ponsonby (1972) sold well and was a critical success, and his poems have been included in several New Zealand anthologies and journals. A collection of his poems titled Steal Away Boy: Selected Poems of David Mitchell was published in 2010, shortly before his death.

== Early life ==
Mitchell was born in Wellington in 1940. He was the son of David Eric Mitchell, a deckhand and former stoker from Sydney, and Rossetta Cousins, a Scottish domestic servant. His father died when he was 13, shortly before he started at Wellington College. His first published poem was in the College's annual magazine, The Wellingtonian. He was fond of sport as a teenager and was named as one of five promising schoolboy cricketers by New Zealand cricket captain John Richard Reid.

Mitchell graduated from Wellington Teachers' Training College in 1960 and taught his probationary year at Upper Hutt School. He also studied at Victoria University of Wellington around this time but did not complete a degree. In January 1962, he travelled to Europe, and returned to Wellington in 1964.

== Literary career ==
At least three of Mitchell's poems had already been published by the time he left for Europe in early 1962, including "poem for my unborn son" and "Magpies" in the New Zealand Listener. He performed regular poetry readings both in Europe and on his return to New Zealand at venues like Barry Lett Galleries. He and his wife moved to Sydney in 1965 and from there to Auckland in 1966; for the rest of his life he moved between New Zealand and Australia.

In 1972, Mitchell's only full-length collection of poems, Pipe Dreams in Ponsonby, was published by Stephen Chan. It received a 'Commended' award in the first Commonwealth Poetry Prize. Chan wrote of the book that "it was a huge critical success almost immediately, but it lost money copiously". The book had ink drawings by New Zealand artist Pat Hanly, who was a friend of Mitchell's. A second edition was published by Caveman Press in 1975, with the support of a grant from the New Zealand State Literary Fund. David Eggleton, writing in the New Zealand Listener, called Pipe Dreams in Ponsonby "one of the best-known and bestselling poetry books [in New Zealand] of the early 1970s, a collection that seemed to capture or encapsulate a particular political and cultural moment". Journalist Hamesh Wyatt said it "was bought and read by people who did not usually buy or read poetry".

In 1975, Mitchell received the Katherine Mansfield Menton Fellowship, which allowed him to spend time working in Menton, France in 1976. Although he wrote a number of poems during his time in Menton, the fellowship did not result in a further collection. Some of his new poems were published in 15 Contemporary New Zealand Poets (1980), edited by Alistair Paterson, and Poetry New Zealand (vol 5, 1982), edited by Frank McKay.

In 1980, Mitchell founded the weekly event "Poetry Live" in Auckland. It is still running (as of 2025) and is New Zealand's longest-running open mic event. Mitchell's friend and fellow poet Iain Sharp later said: "[Mitchell] told me once that he was embarrassed about not producing a new book after he returned from being the 1976 Katherine Mansfield Fellow in Menton. Setting up Poetry Live was his alternative — a way of giving something back to local literature."

In 2002, Mitchell graduated from the Victoria University of Wellington with a Bachelor of Arts. He had resumed his studies in the early 1980s but due to health and financial issues the degree took time to complete.

Mitchell was a keen cricketer and played for the Grafton United Cricket Club until 2002. He was a contributor to the anthology A Tingling Catch: A Century of NZ Cricket Poems 1864–2009 published by Mark Pirie. Reviewer Terry Locke said that Mitchell's poem "gasometer/ponsonby" was "probably my favourite poem in the book", and noted that Mitchell was "the one person who has both written a poem about cricket in this book and has had a poem written about him, i.e. Ron Riddell's "Poet & Cricketer"".

In April 2010, Steal Away Boy: Selected Poems of David Mitchell was published by the Auckland University Press, edited by Martin Edmond and Nigel Roberts. Mitchell is described in the book's description as "one of New Zealand’s great poetic characters from the mid-1960s to the mid-1980s: poet, lover, political activist, cricketer, impresario, mysterium and, to some, an all-round pain in the arse". The book was listed as one of the New Zealand Listener Top 100 Books of 2010. The book was praised by critics: Hamesh Wyatt, reviewing the collection for the Otago Daily Times, called the book "a vivid and frequently gorgeous reminder that David Mitchell is a talented poet", while Paula Green in the NZ Herald noted that his poems were "written to be performed with a playful use of word antics and repetition, but they work on the page. They are fresh (still), fluid and full of ease."

== Personal life ==
While Mitchell was in London in 1963, he met 18-year-old Elsebeth Nielsen, a Danish au pair who later became a fashion model. They married that August, after Nielsen became pregnant, and had a daughter Sara in March 1964. The marriage was a difficult one and she left him in December 1966 and returned to Denmark for a year and a half. There were two more attempts at reconciliation before they separated for good around 1969. Mitchell later had another daughter, Genevieve.
