= Peak beard =

Cultural phenomenon

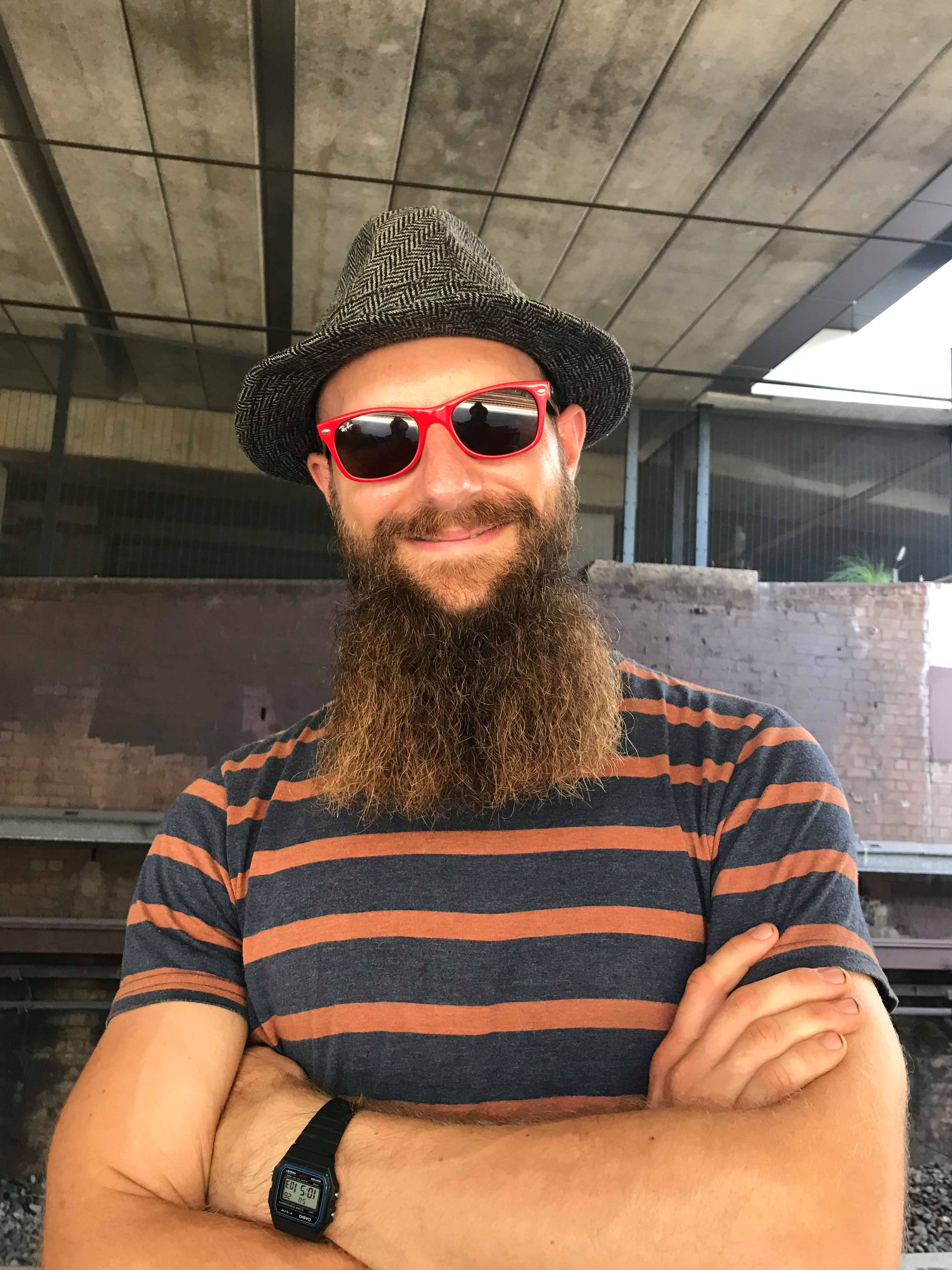
Man with a hipster beard

Peak beard is the belief that during the early 2010s the prevalence of beards in the general population of Western men had reached its maximum.

== History ==
The concept of peak beard gained wider popularity following the publication of an academic paper from a team based at University of New South Wales, which suggested that there was a long term cyclic variance in the prevalence of beards in Western culture due to the role that scarcity of physical attributes plays in sexual selection in heterosexual men and bisexual and heterosexual women. They suggested that as facial hair becomes dominant, clean-shaven faces become a more desirable trait in partner selection due to their scarcity. Similarly, when clean-shaven faces are dominant, beards become a more desired trait. This applied to both men and women as the observers.

The increasing prevalence of beards in the 2000s followed a period throughout the 1990s which was characterized by a general lack of facial hair. It was suggested the growth of beards may have been triggered by the 2008 financial crisis, and that a similar pattern may have occurred following the Wall Street Crash in the 1920s. Researcher Rob Brooks theorized that this may be a result of high unemployment, with men seeking to emphasize other aspects of their masculinity to compensate for lack of work. The beard during this period became associated with emergence of the contemporary hipster subculture, which itself had been suggested to be a reaction to growth of the metrosexual male. The team hypothesised that beards follow a 30-year cycle.

Whilst numerous media noted the possibility that beard prevalence had peaked in the early 2010s, a YouGov poll suggested that beards had become more commonplace in November 2016 compared with August 2011. This was reflected in the persistent decline in the sales of razor blades between 2013 and 2015.

The beard's oft-predicted demise was suggested to have been further delayed by the onset of the COVID-19 pandemic, when remote working from home became rapidly widespread as a public health measure to mitigate the pandemic's spread. That in turn made it acceptable for more workers to go through the unshaven look on their way to growing full beards.
