= Samantha Harris (model) =

Australian fashion model (born 1990)

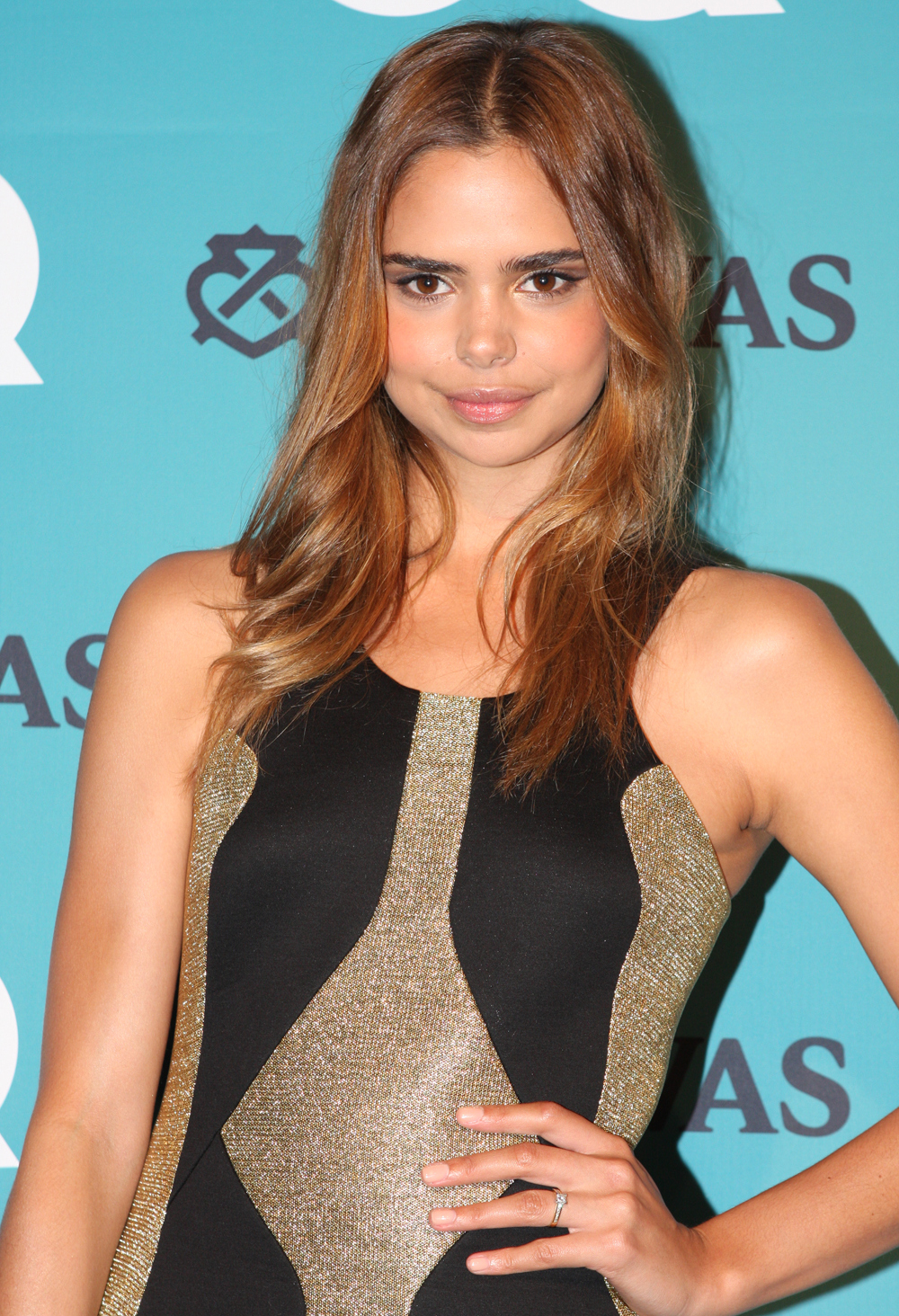
- Harris at the Ivy Ballroom in Sydney, November 2012
- Born: 20 July 1990 (age 36); Tweed Heads, New South Wales, Australia
- Occupation: Model
- Years active: 2003–present
- Modeling information
- Height: 5 ft 10.5 in (1.79 m)
- Hair color: Brown
- Eye color: Brown

Samantha Harris (born 20 July 1990) is an Australian fashion model.

== Early life ==
Born and raised in Tweed Heads, New South Wales, Harris considers her hometown to be the Gold Coast. Through her mother she is descended from the Dunghutti Indigenous tribe. Her mother is a part of the Stolen Generations, and her father is of German and English descent. She attended Tweed River High School in teenage years and has three brothers.

== Career ==
At age 13, Harris won the "Girlfriend Magazine Covergirl" competition which catapulted her to international fame and a contract with Chic Management.

In 2006, Harris was flown to New York to be shot by Patrick Demarchelier for Glamour. Shortly after this, in 2010 Harris was announced as a brand ambassador for popular Australian swimwear brand Seafolly. Harris featured prominently during Australian Fashion Week 2010 where she appeared in a record number of shows. Harris appeared in the March 2010 edition of Vogue Australia, and featured on the June 2010 cover of the same magazine. Harris was also shot by Simon Upton for Harper's Bazaar Singapore.

In January 2011, Harris was named a "young women's fashion ambassador" for Australian department store David Jones. Along with Miranda Kerr and Megan Gale, Harris was part of the store's television and print campaign for the Spring/Summer 2011/12 season.

In 2015, Harris was a contestant in the fifteenth season of Dancing with the Stars and became an ambassador for Priceline.

At age 18, Harris was the second Indigenous model to grace the cover of Vogue Australia, after Elaine George in 1993, and is pushing for more diversity in the modelling industry. “Australia is nowadays very multicultural. There are plenty of different races and it's nice to showcase what we have to offer on the runways… It's celebrating us as a country,” she stated. Harris has been a staunch supporter of the Black Lives Matter movement and has been vocal regarding the debate to move Australia Day to a different date.

In 2019, Harris was named as a Goodwill Ambassador for World Vision Australia.

In August 2019, Harris graced the cover of the Spring edition of independent fashion magazine Façon Australia.

Harris is proud to have been part of the change in the way people perceive models and the change in body image standards. Harris stated, "we aren’t all size 6 or 8 and you can’t expect to sell clothing to someone who is a size 12 or 14 by showing them a photo of someone in a tiny dress. That’s unrealistic and fashion brands need to understand that they have to cater for all body types".

== Personal life ==
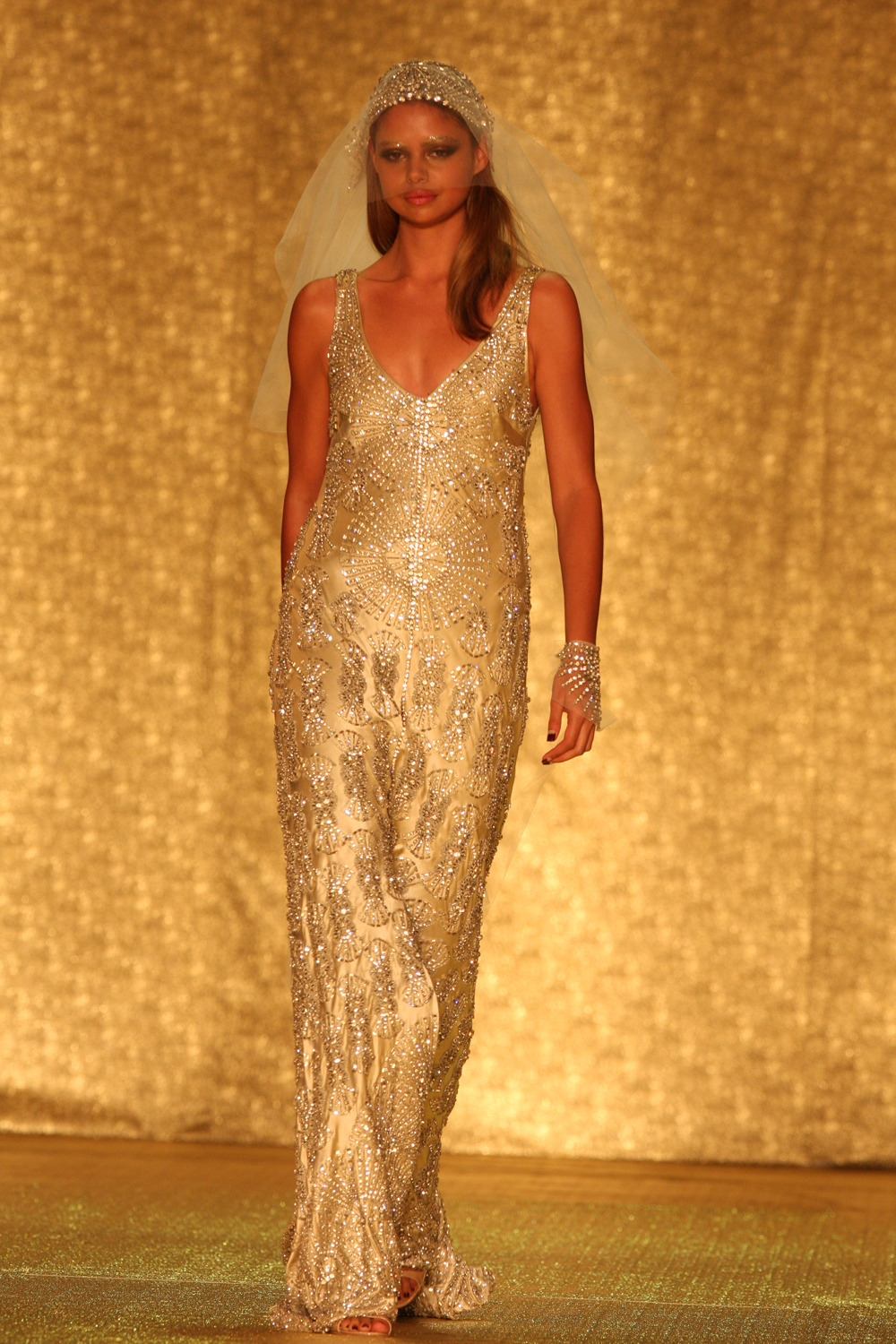
Samantha Harris on the catwalk of Australian Fashion Week Spring Summer 2012/2013

In 2016, Harris announced that she had secretly wed her long term partner, Luke Hunt in March 2014 wearing a Carla Zampatti dress. Harris explained to Marie Claire that the couple had opted to keep the wedding secret after the pair were involved in a tragic accident in 2012, resulting in the death of a 78 year old grandfather. Hunt was charged and sentenced to jail, with a minimum two years before parole. The couple were already engaged, but when faced with a stretch of time apart, they decided to marry two months before Luke’s sentence began.

Harris currently lives in Sydney, New South Wales with her pets and husband.
