= Nicholas Samartis =

Australian artist

- Occupations: Contemporary artist Sculptor; Photographer

Nicholas Samartis is a contemporary artist working across several mediums including sculpture, photography, film, art installations and as a creative director. He is also known for his photographic artworks and portraiture in American Vogue.

== Biography ==
Samartis has worked with U.S Conde Nast, The New York Metropolitan Opera and during a decade long career with the US Vogue he worked with many notable icons, including Academy Award winners, Anne Hathaway, Alejandro González Iñárritu, Cate Blanchett and among others, Keira Knightley, Hugh Jackman, Amy Adams, Naomi Watts, Ashley Judd, Katie Holmes, Gerard Butler, Evan Rachel Wood, and music superstars, Prince, Tom Petty, Billy Joel. And artists including Jeff Koons.

Samartis received 'The 'Pinnacle Award' for photography at The Australian Design Biennale in the year 2014. He was featured in the Australian edition of Masters of Photography in 2015. He was one of the 2016 finalists for the National Portrait Prize at The National Portrait Gallery in Canberra and a finalist in Paddington Art Prize and his sculptures have been featured at Sculpture by the Sea in 2021.

In 2018, inspired by the 1960s brutalist frieze designed by Pablo Picasso, Collegi d'Arquitectes de Catalunya, Samartis designed and created the major work 'All You Need is Love', a 5-meter x 2-meter brutalist wall with 65 hand-made and individually colored resin blocks in a font sourced from Dutch master-graphic-designer, Jurriaan Schrofer, for Crystalbrook Collection, helmed by Ghassan Aboud. The words, All You Need Is Love were originally written by John Lennon.

In December 2021, Samartis was selected out of hundreds of applicants to exhibit at the inaugural show, opening the newly minted Woollahra Gallery (formerly Redleaf Library) in a group show along with 3 other notable artists.

In March 2022, Samartis was announced as the recipient of the prestigious Andrea Stretton Award for sculpture.

== Exhibitions ==
- Blue Period – Solo show at The Downtown Standard Hotel, Los Angeles.
- National Gallery, Canberra – National Portrait Prize Finalist group show 2016.
- M2 Gallery – Group Show, 2016
- Words Matter – Solo Show at Stylecraft Sydney, 2017
- Antumbra – A summer group exhibition, Olsen Gallery, Sydney, 2018
- WhiteWall Art Project- Group Show, 2018 Sydney.
- Penumbra – Group show, Olsen Gruin Gallery, New York. 2019
- Sculpture by the Sea – Bondi 2021
- Woollahra Gallery (at Redleaf) group show 2021–22.
- Sculpture by the Sea – Cottesloe, Perth. 2022
