= Chandra North =

American model (born 1970)

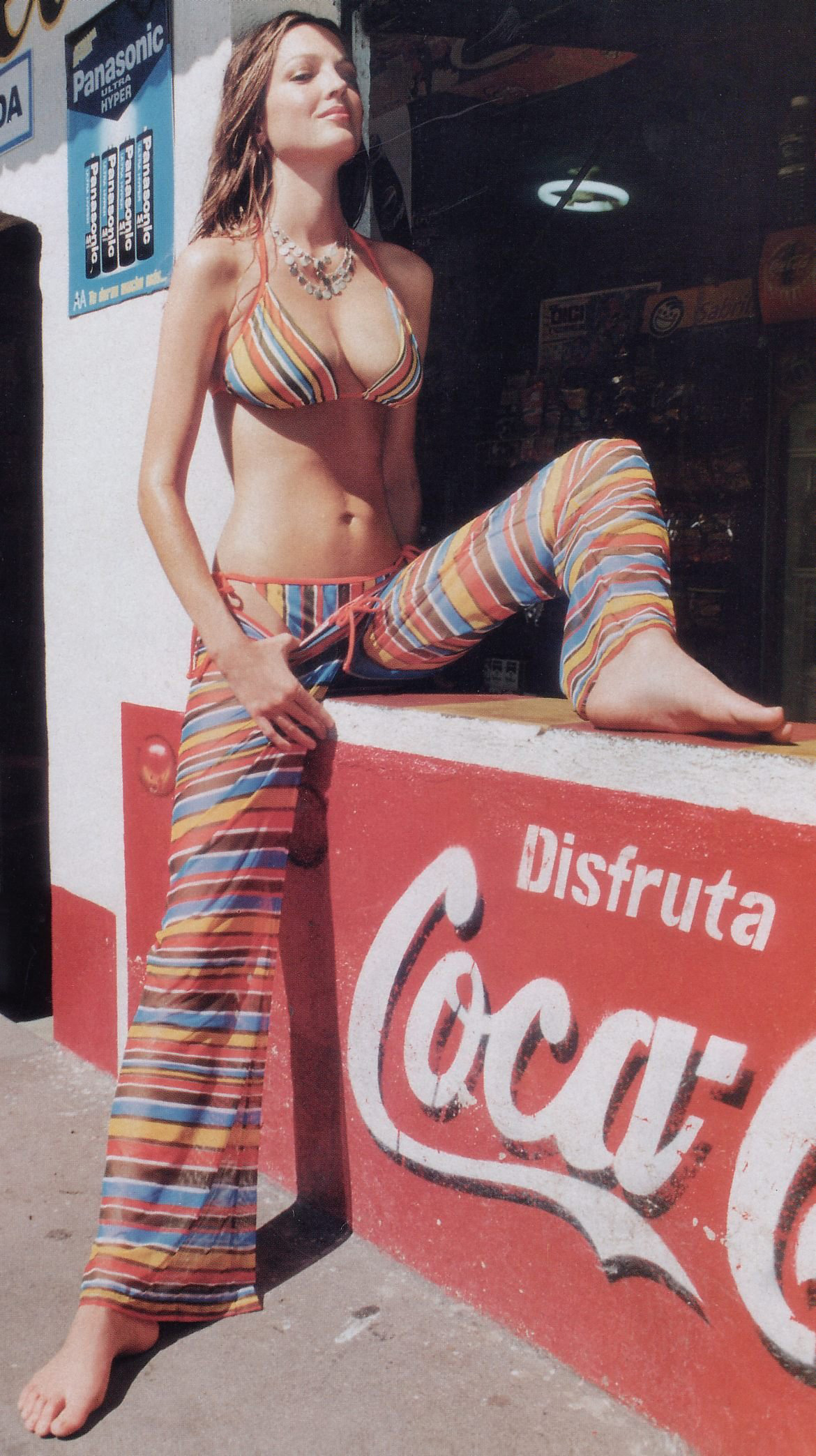
- Born: July 31, 1970 (age 56); Dallas, Texas
- Modeling information
- Height: 5 ft 9 in (1.75 m)
- Hair color: Brown
- Eye color: Blue
- Agency: DNA Model Management (New York); Marilyn Agency (Paris); Why Not Model Management (Milan); Kim Dawson Agency (Dallas); Mega Model Agency (Hamburg); Front Management (Miami); SMG (Seattle)

Chandra Stewart North-Blaylock (born July 31, 1970, in Dallas, Texas, United States) is an American model.

== Early years ==
Growing up, North had aspirations of becoming a professional ballerina. In her teen years, North was a bit rebellious. While her classmates would be attending school dance, she would be hitting up underground night clubs. While attending Southern Methodist University, she was scouted by a male model during her spring break. Shortly thereafter, she signed with The Kim Dawson Agency in Dallas and she secured modeling jobs for local news papers and department store catalogs.

In 1991, North left Texas to pursue her dream of becoming a professional dancer. Shortly after moving to New York City, her modeling career moved her to Paris. After struggling to make it in Europe, North came back to New York where she met her future husband, then a bicycle messenger. With his support, she eventually landed more work.

== Career ==
In 1995, North featured in the Sports Illustrated Swimsuit Edition in which she wore a grass bikini. Since then, she has been featured in advertisements for Alberta Ferretti, Versace, Saks Fifth Avenue, Givenchy, J.Crew, Valentino, Chanel, and Banana Republic. North has walked the runways for Christian Dior, DKNY, and Chanel. North has also appeared on the covers of Vogue, Elle, Marie Claire, and Harper's Bazaar.

In 1999, North was featured in the Pirelli Calendar. North is currently represented by DNA Model Management, FM Model Agency and Kim Dawson Agency.

In 2012, North was the print model to celebrate Shiseido's 140th anniversary.
