= Magnolia Maymuru =

Aboriginal actress and model

- Born: December 10, 1996 (age 29); Yirrkala, Northern Territory, Australia
- Occupations: Actress & Model
- Years active: 2016-Present
- Relatives: Leila Gurruwiwi (aunt); Naminapu Maymuru-White (grandmother)
- Modeling information
- Height: 5 ft 10 in (1.78 m)
- Hair color: Black
- Eye color: Black

Maminydjama Magnolia Maymuru (born December 10, 1996) is an Aboriginal Australian actress and model who won Best Supporting Actress at the 9th AACTA awards, for her portrayal in The Nightingale. She was born in Yirrkala in the Northern Territory of Australia and belongs to the Yolngu community.

In 2014, as a teenager, she was spotted by a model scout while withdrawing money from an ATM. First, she turned down the offer as she was continuing her education. She later agreed to take part in a fashion show and to enter the fashion industry, as she met Mehali Tsangaris, director of NT Fashion Week, while she was shopping. As a model, she used her registered middle name, Magnolia. At the age of 19, Maminydjama Magnolia Maymuru became the first Aboriginal woman from the Northern Territory to enter the Miss World Australia beauty pageant and reached the national finals.

She is the niece of media commentator and television show producer Leila Gurruwiwi and the granddaughter of artist Naminapu Maymuru-White.
