= Healing Stone (The Best of Yothu Yindi) =

Greatest hits album by Yothu Yindi
- Released: 30 November 2012
- Recorded: 1988–2000, 2012
- Length: 74:13
- Label: Liberation Music

Yothu Yindi chronology
Garma (2000)	Healing Stone (The Best of Yothu Yindi) (2012)	The Genesis Project (2015)

Singles from Healing Stone (The Best of Yothu Yindi)
- 1. "Healing Stone" Released: September 2012

Healing Stone (The Best of Yothu Yindi) is the first greatest hits album by Australian band, Yothu Yindi. It was released in November 2012 to coincide with the band's ARIA Hall of Fame induction, and it peaked at number 88 on the ARIA Charts.

== Reception ==
Carley Hall from The Music AU said "It's difficult to envision a musical landscape here... without the storytelling force of Yothu Yindi. They crossed the cultural divide of the tumultuous social and political landscape of the late-1980s by creating a sound that was both unique and at once accessible to Australian and overseas audiences, and Healing Stone celebrates over two decades and six albums of Yothu Yindi and their contribution to the ongoing process of healing the rift in our modern social and political outlooks. This best of is a succinct summation of the group's output since 1986, yet it covers a requisite number of tracks that facilitated talking points surrounding their powerful message. As the first songs to gain extensive airplay largely using Aboriginal language, 'Treaty', 'Djäpana' and 'Tribal Voice' appear first as the three most commercially successful singles... Yunupingu's spirit-evoking chant on the former is still as enthralling now as it was more than 20 years ago. The years onward are spaced apart with 'Timeless Land', 'One Blood', 'World Turning' and 'Yolngu Boy' aptly representing the band's evolving knack for blending western rock with ancient north-east Arnhem Land song cycles and combining them with traditional instruments and dance performances." Hall concluded saying "This retrospective collection perfectly highlights Yothu Yindi's legacy, with the hope it will continue to reap positive change."

== Track listing ==
Healing Stone (The Best of Yothu Yindi)
No.	Title	from the album	Length
1.	"Treaty" (Radio mix)	Tribal Voice	3:50
2.	"Djäpana" (Radio mix)	Tribal Voice	3:59
3.	"Tribal Voice"	Tribal Voice	4:14
4.	"Mainstream"	Homeland Movement	4:03
5.	"Timeless Land"	Freedom	5:11
6.	"Macassan Crew"	Garma	4:16
7.	"Djatpa"	Tribal Voice	4:47
8.	"Yirrmala"	Birrkuta – Wild Honey	4:43
9.	"One Blood"	One Blood	6:19
10.	"Baywara"	Freedom	4:49
11.	"Dots On the Shells"	Freedom	4:31
12.	"Maralitja"	Tribal Voice	4:04
13.	"World Turning"	Freedom	4:27
14.	"Superhighway"	Birrkuta – Wild Honey	3:35
15.	"Tears for Law (Garrathiya Run)"	Birrkuta – Wild Honey	4:27
16.	"Yolngu Boy"	Homeland Movement	4:14
17.	"Healing Stone"	new recording	3:28

DVD

1. "Treaty" (Radio Mix)
2. "Djäpana" (Radio Mix)
3. "Tribal Voice"
4. "World Turning" (Rawak Mix)
5. "Dots on the Shells"
6. "Timeless Land"
7. "Superhighway"
8. "Community Life"
9. "Ghost Spirits"
10. "Healing Stone"
11. "World Turning" (Original Version)
12. "Mainstream"
13. "Djäpana" (Original Version)
14. "Gudurrku"
15. Tribal Voice Documentary

== Charts ==
Chart performance for Healing Stone (The Best of Yothu Yindi)
Chart (2012)	Peak position
Australian Albums (ARIA)	88

== Release history ==
Country	Date	Format	Label	Catalogue
Australia	30 November 2012	CD, CD+DVD, Digital download, streaming	Liberation Music	LMCD0212
