= Yolngu Boy =

2001 Australian film

- DVD cover
- Directed by: Stephen Maxwell Johnson
- Written by: Chris Anastassiades
- Produced by: Patricia Edgar; M. Yunupingu; Galarrwuy Yunupingu; Gordon Glenn
- Starring: Sean Mununggurr; John Sebastian Pilakui; Nathan Daniels
- Cinematography: Brad Shield
- Edited by: Ken Sallows
- Music by: Mark Ovenden
- Production company: Australian Children's Television Foundation | Burrundi Pictures | Yothu Yindi Foundation
- Release date: 22 March 2001
- Running time: 85 minutes
- Country: Australia
- Language: English
- Box office: $645,700

Yolngu Boy is a 2001 Australian coming-of-age film directed by Stephen Maxwell Johnson, produced by Patricia Edgar, Gordon Glenn, Galarrwuy Yunupingu and Mandawuy Yunupingu, casting director was Maggie Miles, and the film starred Sean Mununggurr, John Sebastian Pilakui, and Nathan Daniels. Yolngu Boy is based around three Aboriginal teenage boys linked by ceremony, kinship and a common dream-to become great Yolngu hunters, in a remote community at Yirrkala in North-East Arnhem Land in the Northern Territory of Australia. The feature film traces the metaphorical journey of the three young Aboriginal teenagers caught in a collision between the modern world and traditional Aboriginal culture where they hunt wild animals in the morning using spears and play football while listening to hip hop rap music in the afternoon. The project involved a significant number of community members in the cast and crew of the film.

== Plot ==
After being initiated and growing up together, troubled natural born leader Botj (Sean Mununggurr), conservative and traditionalist Lorrpu (John Sebastian) and football loving ladies' man Milika (Nathan Daniels) are transitioning from childhood to adulthood.

Botj, who has recently been released from prison, decides to break into the local store to get cigarettes and he convinces Lorrpu and Milika to join him. Lorrpu and Milika decide to return home, but Botj remains and gets high by sniffing petrol. He makes his way to the Women's Community Centre, where he lights a smoke, but as he does this, the petrol ignites and the building is burnt down.

The boys find themselves on the wrong side of both black and white law. Determined to help Botj avoid imprisonment, Lorrpu and Milika trek with him from their home in north-eastern Arnhem Land through the wilderness and treacherous escarpment country to Darwin to plead his case before Dawu (Nungki Yunupingu), a Yolngu elder. On their journey they draw upon the ancient bush knowledge they were taught as boys, the street instinct of their leader, Botj, and consequently gain new respect for themselves, and the land they come from.

In Darwin, Lorrpu tries to convince Dawu that Botj is rehabilitated, but Dawu does not believe him. Botj fears he may be turned over to the police, so he leaves the group and attempts to find his father. When he finds his father, his father is so intoxicated that he is unable to recognize Botj. Following this, Botj turns to sniffing petrol once again and while under its effects, he falls to his death from a bridge. His body is discovered by Lorrpu and Milika later that day.

Lorrpu and Milika return to their original home and their old lives. For Lorrpu, the journey has been a rite of passage, and through it he has been able to gain the acceptance of his elders.

== Cast ==
- John Sebastian Pilakui – Lorrpu
- Sean Mununggurr – Botj
- Nathan Daniels – Milika
- Lirrina Mununggur – Yuwan
- Makuma Yunupingu – Matjala
- Nungki Yunupingu – Dawu
- Mangatjay Yunupingu – Maralitja Man
- Gurkula (Jack Thompson) – Policeman
- Gerard Buyan Garrawurra – Lunginy

== Production history ==
The project was a joint development with independent producer, Stephen Johnson of Darwin-based production company, Burrundi Pictures. Gordon Glenn, of Cradle Mountain Film Productions, co-produced the film. The project had the support of the Yirrkala community and involved a significant number of community members in the cast and crew of the film.

In late April 1996, Foundation Director, Patricia Edgar, Johnson and Gordon Glenn, of Burrundi Films, travelled to north Arnhem Land to discuss proposals for the workshops and for a feature film with the community, the Yirrkala Dhanbul Council and Galarrwuy Yunupingu. During the visit, Edgar spent time hunting mud crabs with elder Gulumbu Mununggurr, who confirmed the community's interest in proceeding with the development of a feature film and the workshops.

Yolngu Boy was the first Australian feature film made with an all-Indigenous lead cast and the full collaboration of the Yolngu people. Galarrwuy Yunupingu and Mandawuy Yunupingu were associate producers. Together with the local community elders, they advised and approved the film from a cultural perspective, including the researching and writing of the script, casting, wardrobe, makeup and art department.

"the families were very excited that the film was focused on their youth culture and community life. They wanted the story to be a true reflection of the big issues facing them today". Director, Stephen Johnson

Darwin-based Corrugated Iron Youth Theatre (CIYT) conducted two weeks of performance workshops for young Yolngu people from the Yirrkala and Gunyangara Communities in north Arnhem Land from 17 to 28 June 1996. The purpose of the workshops was to provide insight into acting skills and the process of filmmaking and Artistic Director of Corrugated Iron Maggie Miles invited the Yolngu Boy team to join the Workshop Program as part of their development for Yolngu Boy. The workshops were sponsored by Northern Territory Health Services, the Aboriginal and Torres Strait Islander Arts Board and the Theatre Fund of the Australia Council. The workshops took place at the Yirrkala School and nearby locations in the community, with 60 children attending. During the first week, the workshops included movement, acting and vocal classes. The second week concentrated on character development, working toward short dramatic presentations. The workshop program was devised and directed by Maggie Miles of CIYT, with Witiyana Marika from the Yirrkala Community as interpreter and assistant director of the workshops.

Stage one of the development phase also involved Johnson and other members of his company, Burundi Pictures, spending two weeks in August researching the project and discussing the script with members of the Yirrkala, Galiwinku, Maningrida and Gunbalanya (Oenpelli) Aboriginal communities. They also conducted a location survey throughout Arnhem Land. A first draft script by Chris Anastassiades was completed in 1997 and then further developed.

After four years of negotiation with the Yolngu community and development, the film was fully financed in early 1999, through a combination of private and government investment, a Northern Territory Government grant, and a pre-sale to SBS Independent. Some scenes in the film required extensive negotiations with local elders to arrange permissions to film at certain sites. For example, one scene where Botj, Lorrpu and Milika climb down a cliff overlooking a waterhole to go for a swim was filmed at Lightning Dreaming at Twin Falls on the edge of the Arnhem Land escarpment, and took months of negotiations with local elders to arrange permission to film.

The casting director, Maggie Miles, with Glenn and Johnson, toured the Northern territory top-end visiting communities and screened 1,000 boys for the three main roles. Sixteen were then selected for a workshop in July to determine a final cast.

Sean Mununggurr is from Gapuwiyak in Eastern Arnhem Land and is a Gumatj dialect speaker, while John Sebastian Pilakui (Sebbie) and Nathan Daniels both hail from Bathurst Island in the Tiwi Islands. For all three, English is their second language, and all three were fifteen years old at the time of filming.

Pre-production commenced in April 1999, with principal photography commencing in the Northern Territory in September 1999.

Yolngu Boy was filmed entirely on location in the Northern Territory during a seven-week shoot, from 17 September 1999 and concluded on 6 November 1999. Filming took place in remote locations in North East Arnhem Land and Kadadu, as well as in Darwin.

"The crew were absolutely fabulous – everyone gave 150 per cent effort. Never has anything like this been done before on this scale in these locations. We had equipment taken into some radical locations and we were moving fast from set-up to set-up." Producer and Executive Producer, Patricia Edgar.

The three main boys, Nathan, Sean and Sebastian, playing Milika, Botj and Lorrpu, had never acted prior to filming Yolngu Boy and had lived their lives in the outback. Johnson felt that they brought a "raw energy" to their characters.

Post-production on the film commenced in Melbourne in November 1999 and the final release print was delivered to the film's distributors in early June 2000.

== Release ==
The world premiere of the film took place on 31 January 2001 in Yirrkala at a temporary outdoor cinema on a football field. The 300 guests who attended were local Yolngu people, many of whom were involved directly or indirectly in the film, whose response was overwhelming.

On 1 February 2001, more than 800 guests arrived at the Village Cinema in central Darwin for a premiere screening, hosted by the Chief Minister of the Northern Territory, Denis Burke. A parliamentary screening hosted by the Peter McGauran, Minister for the Arts, took place in Parliament House, Canberra, on 7 February 2001. The Melbourne premiere, hosted by Victorian Premier Steve Bracks and Terry Bracks, took place on 12 February 2001. A Sydney premiere was held on 15 March 2001.

Yolngu Boy was released in major cinemas across Australia from March 2001.

The domestic theatrical distributor was Palace Films. The film was also pre-sold to SBS Independent. Beyond Films Limited distributed overseas and investors included the Australian Film Finance Corporation, Film Victoria, the Northern Territory Government, SBSI, the Australian Children's Television Foundation (ACTF), along with private investment.

Yolngu Boy was selected to screen at three festivals: the Cinemagic Northern Ireland World Screen Entertainment Festival for Young People in Belfast in December 2001; the Barcelona International Festival and the Brooklyn Academy of Music's Next Wave Festival in the USA. The Next Wave Festival had a month long focus on Australian arts and culture and included a three-week festival of Australian films of the past 10 years.

Athabasca University in Canada hosted the Canadian premiere of Yolngu Boy in conjunction with their indigenous education program.

=== Advance free screening for teachers ===
Free screenings of the feature film Yolngu Boy took place for teachers in the first week of December in capital cities around Australia.

A study Guide for teachers was available at the screenings. Key Themes included in the Study Guide were Rites of Passage and personal Growth, The Search For Identity, Friendship, Rules, Rights and Responsibilities and Culture. The themes and activities developed in the Study Guide targeted teachers and students from middle to senior years in the subjects of Australian history, Cultural Studies, Aboriginal and Torres Strait Islander Studies, Studies of Society and Environment, English, Personal Development and Media Studies.

=== Canberra screening ===
On 7 February, the Hon Peter McGauran, Minister for the Arts, hosted a parliamentary screening of Yolngu Boy at Parliament House in Canberra. The screening, introduced by producer Patricia Edgar and Director Stephen Johnson, was attended by over 300 guests including Dr. David Kemp, Minister for Education, Training and Youth Affairs and the Hon. Phillip Ruddock, Minister for Reconciliation and Aboriginal and Torres Strait Islander Affairs.

=== Inspired Youth Program ===
Eight teenage boys from the Sunbury-based young men's program visited the ACTF on 16 May 2001. The group met with Yolngu Boy's producer, Patricia Edgar, and writer, Chris Anastassiades. Youth Services Officer, Darren Rose, took the group to see Yolngu Boy earlier in the year. The film has such a great impact on the boys that they wanted to meet with the film's producer to get further insight into the making of the film and the themes it explores. The group later participated in an exchange program in the Northern Territory in September of that year.

== Distribution ==
In 2002, Yolngu Boy's international distributor, Beyond International Film Sales, reported that television sales were made during the year to Shapira Films (Israel) and Aipi-Bulgaria, and a video deal was concluded with Video Networks UK. Highlights of the Foundation's sales in 2002 included sales of 793 copies of Yolngu Boy. The film was distributed in Australia and New Zealand by Palace Films and, until March 2003, was distributed internationally by Beyond Films. During 2002, Palace sold Australian pay television rights to showtime, and Beyond sold Canadian Pay TV rights to the Aboriginal People's Network.

In March 2003, the ACTF assumed responsibility for international distribution of Yolngu Boy. The ACTF also participated in the national conference of the Social Education Association of Australia (SEAA) in Melbourne from 9–12 July. The conference included a session on Studying Contemporary Indigenous Issues featuring Yolngu Boy and Australian Rules. Lee Burton also presented a session on teaching social education issues through ACTF programs. At the MIPCOM television market held in Cannes in October 2003, the ACTF sold Yolngu Boy to YLE Finland.

In 2004, Yolngu Boy was sold to the Finnish Broadcasting Company (Finland).

== Box office ==
Yolngu Boy grossed A$645,700 at the box office in Australia.

== Reviews ==
"Yolngu Boy is a sensitive but dramatic treatment of the search for identity in modern Australia by three indigenous boys. This is a long overdue film about what it means to be a young indigenous person in Australia today. I hope very many Australians go to see it". Dr David Kemp, Federal Minister for Education, Training and Youth Affairs

"...probably the most important Australian film of the year...I wish I could compel every Australian to see it". Peter Thompson, Sunday, Channel 9

"This is a terrific contribution to the reconciliation process...The film has great honesty, but will also provide greater understanding of indigenous spirituality and culture. There were some images in the film that will stay with me for some time". Michael Gorton, Co-Chair, Australians for Reconciliation

"I could personally relate to it myself. The dream is stronger than the goal". Michael Long, Essendon Football Club

"Yolngu Boy is a movie with heart and integrity, but is also insightful, original and intensely compelling". The Hon Peter McGauran MP, Federal Minister for the Arts and the Centenary of Federation

"Yolngu Boy is one of the most rewarding films that you are likely to see...This is truly a masterpiece of community spirit and a gift to the world. Don't miss this film, a remarkable insight into contemporary Australia. Five out of five". James Brandis, WA Post

"The film, about three teenagers caught between the modern world and their traditional culture, is a visual feast". FOCUS, autumn markets

"An edifying film that was both confronting and humbling – a presentation for all Australians to see". The Hon. Philip Ruddock, Minister for Reconciliation and Aboriginal and Torres Strait Islander Affairs

"A really impressive film with incredible energy. I think it showed great insight into a culture that white Australians know nothing about". Deb Cox, CoxKnight Productions, Creator SeaChange

"Yolngu Boy is realistic and, at times, confronting. It is also an original, beautiful and moving film. It should be seen by all Australians – because it gives us a deeper understanding of indigenous culture and experiences, while still telling a great story". The Hon. Steve Bracks MP, Premier of Victoria.

"...this estimable fable for the 21st century deserves as wide an audience as possible. A moving drama about lives in the making and battles against the odds, it is also a compelling adventure yarn with a brain". Tom Ryan, Sunday Age

"...such an impressive film...you're being presented with parts of Australian life you've never seen before..." Margaret Pomeranz, SBS Movie Show

== Soundtrack ==
1. Kakadu – M.Yunupingu
2. Neva Mend – Nokturnl
3. Black Bugs – Regurgitator
4. Gapu – Yothu Yindi
5. Poisonous Love/Ghost Spirit – Yothu Yindi
6. Treaty – Yothu Yindi
7. Surrender – Songlines Music Aboriginal Corporation
8. Farewell – Garmadi Community, Co-Ordinated by Laura Naborhiborhl

== Website ==
The Yolngu Boy website was completed in anticipation of the release of the film in Australia in March 2001. The site included a flash trailer, electronic postcards, behind-the-scenes clips, information about Yolngu culture and language, a downloadable press kit and a downloadable study guide for educators.

== Yolngu artwork ==
Two painted panels that feature in Yolngu Boy are on permanent display at Melbourne Museum. The copies of the Yirrkala Church Panels, painted by Yirrkala artists Gaymala Yunupingu, her sister Gulumbu Yunupingu, and Dhuwarrwarr Marika, are 4 m (13 ft) high and feature images of strong ancestral significance to the people of Arnhem Land in northern Australia. Following the completion of the film, the ACTF donated the panels to Melbourne Museum to ensure their preservation and public exhibition.

The panels were unveiled by Janet Holmes a Court, Chairman of the ACTF, at Melbourne Museum on 9 February.

== Awards ==
Ceremony	Category	Year	Result
Zanzibar International Film Festival	People's Choice Award	2001	Won
Giffoni Film Festival Italy	Bronze Gryphon Award	2001	Won

John Sebastian Pilakui won the Young Actors’ Award for the 2001 AFI Awards in Melbourne on 16 November for his performance as Lorrpu.

== See also ==
- Cinema of Australia
