= Gavin Campbell (music producer) =

Australian DJ and remixer

Gavin Campbell is an Australian club DJ and remixer based in Melbourne, Victoria. He created the dance music production outfit known as Filthy Lucre, which is known for its 1991 remix of Yothu Yindi's single "Treaty", known as "Treaty (Filthy Lucre remix)".

He is also the founder of Razor Recordings, formerly known as Razor Records.

== DJ ==
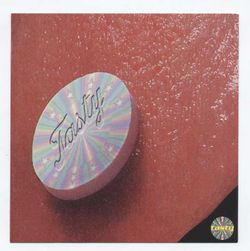
Promotional card of a Tasty party (1994)

Gavin Campbell was a renowned DJ at many Melbourne clubs of the 1980s and 1990s, including the highly successful Razor, along with Tasty, Savage, Bump! and others.

The Tasty nightclub raid, in which Victoria Police raided the club and mistreated its predominantly LGBTQI clientele in 1994, brought the club to public attention, and was a seminal event in the history of gay rights in Australia. Campbell organised a Tasty Raid 20th Anniversary event in 2014, which was highly successful.

Campbell was a co-founder and resident DJ Poof Doof, and as of 2018 was resident DJ at the quarterly event known as Trough X. He plays techno, house music, disco and funk.

== Production and remixing ==
After licensing a pair of old disco hits from the U.S. by Jimmy Bo Horne, in 1988–9 Campbell created Razor Records, the first independent dance music label in Australia. When the label was acquired by Mushroom Records, Razor started to make its own dance music.

The dance production team known as Filthy Lucre, comprising Campbell, DJ Paul Main and Robert Goodge (songwriter and guitarist with the band I'm Talking) was the main act on Razor, with their main hit the remix of the Yothu Yindi song "Treaty".

=== "Treaty" (1991 remix) ===
In 1991 Filthy Lucre created a remix of Yolngu band Yothu Yindi's song "Treaty". The remix removed most of the lyrics sung in English, leaving the song sung almost entirely in the Aboriginal language, Gumatj. The Filthy Lucre remix was released in June 1991 and spent a total of 22 weeks in the national charts, peaking at No. 11. In January 2018, as part of Triple M's "Ozzest 100" ("the most Australian songs of all time"), the Filthy Lucre version of "Treaty" was ranked number 10.

For this song, Campbell and Main were the first Australian DJs to be awarded a Gold Record certified by ARIA, and they were also nominated in the 1992 Best Producer Category for the ARIA Awards.

In 1992, Filthy Lucre remixed Hunters and Collectors' "Talking to a Stranger". The song peaked at number 141 on the ARIA charts.

=== 21st century ===
The Razor 25th anniversary party was held in 2012, and the Tasty Raid 20th Anniversary event in 2014. both successful events, leading to the reincarnation of Razor Records as Razor Recordings in 2014. In the same year, Campbell's solo track "The Saboteurs" (featuring Evangeline), spent four weeks on top of the Kiss FM Australia dance chart, and several weeks in the ARIA Club Chart.

In 2016 Razor Recordings released a package of seven new remixes of "Treaty" to celebrate the 25th anniversary of the song, including versions by Campbell, Yolanda Be Cool, Pip Norman, Nick Coleman, Jack Love, and Duncan Gray, and includes a bonus 2016 remaster of the 1991 Filthy Lucre version. In the same year, New Zealand-born artist, actor and musician Samuel Gaskin was signed to Razor, releasing two debut singles on the label.

Around 2017 Filthy Lucre was expanded to include Melbourne DJ/producer Nick Coleman and multi-instrumentalist Ania Reynolds (who was then musical director of Circus Oz). Campbell then led the creation of a new live show, Yothu Yindi & The Treaty Project, which included some of the original members of Yothu Yindi along with several new artists.). Longtime members Witiyana Marika, Malngay Yunupingu and Stuart Kellaway were joined by blues singer Yirrmal (Marika's son), vocalists Yirrnga Yunupingu and Constantina Bush (aka Kamahi Djordon King), Reynolds, and guitarist Megan Bernard, while Coleman and Campbell worked on mixing and production.

Campbell produced further remixes of "Treaty" in 2019, as did British DJ and remixer Carl Cox, and also produced a remastered version of the 1991 remix in the same year. Cox performed with Yothu Yindi & The Treaty Project at the Babylon Festival, Carapooee, Victoria, in February 2019.

Actor and filmmaker Robert Chuter described him as "one of the most important and influential figures in the dance music and club scene in Australia... a Melbourne legend, a much loved DJ who refuses to be ordinary".
