= Yothu Yindi =

Australian musical group

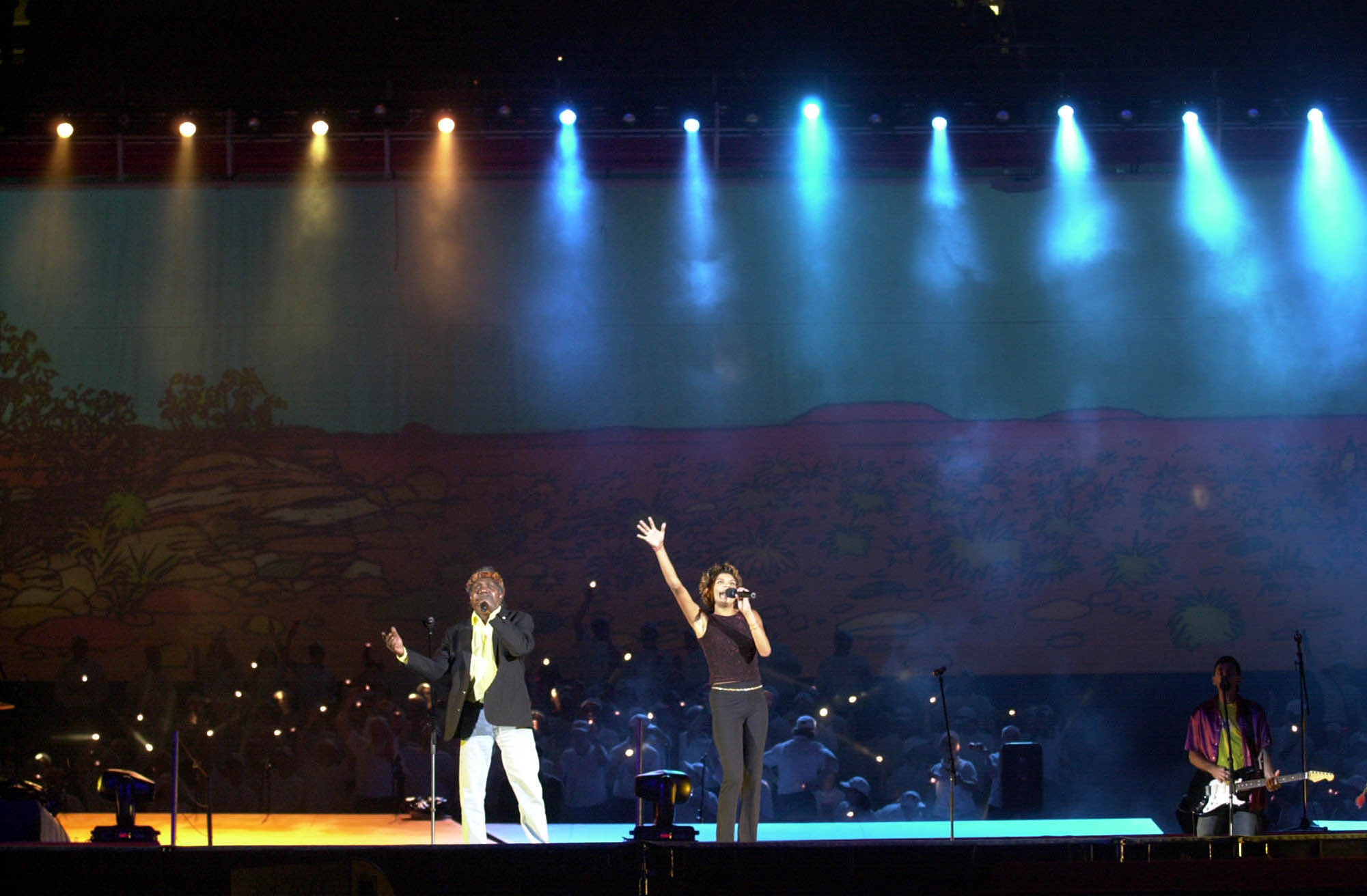
- Yothu Yindi perform at the Opening Ceremony of the 2000 Summer Paralympics in Sydney, Australia

Background information
- Also known as: Swamp Jockeys (Todd Williams, Michael Wyatt, Cal Williams, Stuart Kellaway, and Andrew Beletty)
- Origin: Yolngu homelands, Northern Territory, Australia
- Genres: Indigenous Australian music; rock
- Years active: 1985–present
- Labels: Mushroom, Hollywood
- Members: See below
- Website: yothuyindi.com.au

Yothu Yindi (Yolngu for "child and mother", pronounced /ˌjɒθuː ˈjɪndi/, natively [ju:t̪u jindi]) is an Australian musical group with Aboriginal and non-Aboriginal members, formed in 1986 as a merger of two bands formed in 1985 – a white rock group called the Swamp Jockeys (Todd Williams, Michael Wyatt, Cal Williams, Stuart Kellaway, Andrew Bellety), and an unnamed Aboriginal folk group consisting of Mandawuy Yunupingu, Witiyana Marika, and Milkayngu Mununggur. The Aboriginal members came from Yolngu homelands near Yirrkala on the Gove Peninsula in Northern Territory's Arnhem Land. Founding members included Stuart Kellaway on bass guitar, Cal Williams on lead guitar, Andrew Belletty on drums, Witiyana Marika on manikay (traditional vocals), bilma (ironwood clapsticks) and dance, Milkayngu Mununggurr on yidaki, Geoffrey Gurrumul Yunupingu on keyboards, guitar, and percussion, past lead singer Mandawuy Yunupingu and present Yirrnga Yunupingu on vocals and guitar.

The band combines aspects of both musical cultures. Their sound varies from traditional Aboriginal songs to modern pop and rock songs, where they blended the typical instruments associated with pop/rock bands, such as guitars and drums, with the traditional yidaki (didgeridoo) and bilma (clap stick). They adapted traditional Yolngu dance performances to accompany their music. More broadly, they promoted mutual respect and understanding in the coming together of different cultures.

Yothu Yindi's most widely known song, "Treaty", peaked at No. 11 on the ARIA singles charts in 1991 and the related album Tribal Voice peaked at No. 4 on the ARIA albums charts.

The group established the Yothu Yindi Foundation in 1990 to promote Yolngu cultural development, including from 1999 producing the annual Garma Festival of Traditional Cultures and from May 2007 running the Dilthan Yolngunha (meaning "Healing Place"). Chairman of the foundation was Galarrwuy Yunupingu. He was Mandawuy's older brother, a Yolngu clan leader and sometimes a member of Yothu Yindi on bilma and guitar. Galarrwuy had been named Australian of the Year in 1978 for his work for Aboriginal communities and Mandawuy was Australian of the Year for 1992 for his work with Yothu Yindi. In December 2012, the Australian Recording Industry Association (ARIA) inducted the band into the ARIA Hall of Fame, as part of the ARIA Music Awards of 2012. In 2023, the band were inducted into the National Indigenous Music Awards Hall of Fame.

== Career ==
=== 1986–1990: Early years ===
Swamp Jockeys were formed in 1985 by balanda (European/non-Aboriginal people) Todd Williams songwriter and lead singer, Michael Wyatt, songwriter and lead singer, Andrew Belletty on drums, Stuart Kellaway on bass guitar and Cal Williams on lead guitar. On their tour of Arnhem Land, in Australia's Northern Territory, they were supported by a Yolngu band composed of Witiyana Marika on manikay (traditional vocals), bilma (ironwood clapsticks) and dance, Milkayngu Mununggurr on yidaki (didgeridoo), Gurrumul 'The Guru' Yunupingu on keyboards, guitar and percussion, and Bakamana Yunupingu on vocals and guitar. They united to form Yothu Yindi (pronounced /ˌjɒθuː ˈjɪndiː/). Yothu yindi is a Yolngu matha (Yolngu language) kinship term for "child and mother".

The band combines aspects of both musical cultures. Their sound varies from traditional Aboriginal songs to modern pop and rock songs in which they blend the typical instruments of pop/rock bands, such as guitars and drums, with the traditional yidaki and bilma. They have adapted traditional Yolngu dance performances to accompany their music. More broadly they promote mutual respect and understanding of different cultures. Michael Wyatt, from the Swamp Jockeys, went on to become Yothu Yindi's pilot and with Stephen Johnson made Yothu Yindi's multiple award winning music video clips. He was also stage manager on Australian tours and their tour to the New York's World Music festival.

Bakamana Yunupingu was a tertiary student studying to become a teacher. He became principal at his own Yirrkala Community School, and touring by Yothu Yindi was restricted to school holidays in the band's early years. In August 1988 they performed in Townsville, Queensland, at the South Pacific Festival of Arts. The next month they represented Australia in Seoul, South Korea at the Cultural Olympics. Bart Willoughby (ex-No Fixed Address, Coloured Stone) joined on drums in late 1988 and Yothu Yindi toured USA and Canada as support act to Midnight Oil. Upon their return to Australia, they were signed to Mushroom Records, and with Leszek Karski (ex-Supercharge) producing, recorded their debut single "Mainstream", released in March 1989. It was followed by debut album Homeland Movement in May; a second single "Djäpana (Sunset Dreaming)" was released in August. Neither their singles nor album had any major chart success. Yothu Yindi toured with Neil Young in Australia, then head-lined in Papua New Guinea and Hong Kong. In 1990 they toured New Zealand with Tracy Chapman, and then performed in festivals in the UK. In 1990 five clans of the Yolngu formed the Yothu Yindi Foundation to promote Yulngu cultural development. Chairman of the foundation was Galarrwuy Yunupingu, Mandawuy's older brother, a Yolngu clan leader and sometimes a member of Yothu Yindi on bilma and guitar. Galarrwuy had been named Australian of the Year in 1978 for his work for Aboriginal communities. Around this time, a relative of Bakamana who bore the same name died, and he therefore changed his first name to Mandawuy, in line with Yolngu tradition.

The band commissioned their friend and relative (married to Gurrumul's sister), master yiḏaki-maker Djalu Gurruwiwi, to make their didgeridoos, which also brought his skills to the attention of the world.

=== 1991–1992: "Treaty" and Tribal Voice ===
In 1988, as part of Bicentennial celebrations, Australian Prime Minister Bob Hawke visited the Northern Territory for the Barunga festival where he was presented with a statement of Aboriginal political objectives by Galarrwuy Yunupingu and Wenten Rubuntja. Hawke responded to the Barunga Statement with a promise that a treaty would be concluded with Indigenous Australians by 1990. By 1991, Yothu Yindi were Hughie Benjamin on drums, Sophie Garrkali and Julie Gungunbuy as dancers, Kellaway, Marika, Mununggurr, Gurrumul Yunupingu, Makuma Yunupingu on yidaki, vocals, bilma, Mandawuy Yunupingu, Mangatjay Yunupingu as a dancer. Mandawuy, with his older brother Galarrwuy, wanted a song to highlight the lack of progress on the treaty between Aboriginal peoples and the federal government. Mandawuy recalls:

Bob Hawke visited the Territory. He went to this gathering in Barunga. And this is where he made a statement that there shall be a treaty between black and white Australia. Sitting around the camp fire, trying to work out a chord to the guitar, and around that camp fire, I said, "Well, I heard it on the radio. And I saw it on the television." That should be a catchphrase. And that's where 'Treaty' was born.

— Mandawuy Yunupingu, 8 July 2004

"Treaty" was written by Australian musician Paul Kelly and Yothu Yindi members Mandawuy Yunupingu, Kellaway, Williams, Gurrumul Yunupingu, Mununggurr and Marika. The initial release had little interest, but when Melbourne-based dance remixers Filthy Lucre's Gavin Campbell and Robert Goodge adapted the song, their version peaked at No. 11 on the Australian Recording Industry Association (ARIA) singles charts by September. The song contains lyrics in both English and in Yolngu matha. It was accompanied by a video showing band members performing vocals, music, and dance.

Success for the single was transferred to the related album Tribal Voice which peaked at No. 4 on the ARIA albums charts, The album, produced by Mark Moffatt for Mushroom Records, was released in September 1991. Mandawuy Yunupingu took leave of absence from his duties as principal to tour and promote the single and album. Other singles from the album were a re-released "Djäpana (Sunset Dreaming)" which peaked at No. 13 in 1992 and "Tribal Voice" which peaked at number 51.

At the 1992 ARIA Awards Yothu Yindi won awards for Best Cover Art for Tribal Voice by Louise Beach and Mushroom Art; Engineer of the Year for "Maralitja" (maralitja is Yolngu matha for crocodile man – one of Mandawuy's tribal names), "Dharpa" (dharpa is tree), "Treaty", "Treaty (Filthy Lucre remix)" and "Tribal Voice" by David Price, Ted Howard, Greg Henderson and Simon Polinski; Best Indigenous Release for Tribal Voice; Song of the Year and Single of the Year for "Treaty. Both "Treaty" in 1992 and "Djäpana (Sunset Dreaming)" in 1993 charted on the Billboard Hot Dance Club Play singles charts, with "Treaty" peaking at No. 6, Tribal Voice peaked at No. 3 on the Billboard Top World Music Albums chart in 1992.

In October 1992, then Prime Minister Paul Keating's government awarded Yothu Yindi with a $30,000 grant. The money was used to travel to New York, where they performed at the United Nations for the launch of International Year for the World's Indigenous People. Mandawuy Yunupingu was named Australian of the Year by the Keating government on 26 January 1993. His older brother, Galarrwuy had been named Australian of the Year in 1978 for his work for Aboriginal communities.

In 2009 'Treaty' was added to the National Film and Sound Archive's Sounds of Australia Registry.

=== 1993–2000: Continued success ===
At the 1993 ARIA Awards, Yothu Yindi won 'Best Video', Burrundi Pictures Michael Wyatt and Stephen Johnson, directed by Stephen Maxwell Johnson, and 'Best Indigenous Release' for "Djäpana (Sunset Dreaming)" and 'Engineer of the Year' for Greg Henderson's work on "Djäpana" and "Tribal Voice".

Yothu Yindi's third album Freedom was released in November 1993, the line-up included Mandawuy, Gurrumul, Makuna and Mangatjay Yunupingu, Marika, Williams, Kellaway, Benjamin and Munumggurr; and new members Banula Marika on vocals and dance, Bunimburr Marika on yidaki, Natalie Gillespie on vocals, Jodie Cockatoo Creed on vocals and clan leader Galarrwuy Yunupingu on bilma and vocals. After intense touring in 1994, Williams left Yothu Yindi and was replaced by Colin Simpson on guitar, they added Ben Hakalitz (ex-Not Drowning Waving) on drums and Baruka Tau-Matagu on keyboards. Gurrumul Yunupingu had left by 1995 to live full-time on Elcho Island, he later formed Saltwater Band to record three albums, and in 2008 released his self-titled solo album. Yothu Yindi's fourth album Birrkuta (birrkuta means wild honey) was released in August 1996.

"I Am Australian" is a popular song written in 1987 by Dobe Newton of The Bushwackers and Bruce Woodley of The Seekers. It was released as a single in 1997 by trio Judith Durham of The Seekers, Russell Hitchcock from Air Supply and Yothu Yindi's Mandawuy Yunupingu by EMI Australia and it peaked at No. 17 on the ARIA Singles Charts in June.

Yothu Yindi's fifth album One Blood was released in 1999 and included "Treaty '98". They sponsored the Yothu Yindi Foundation, which produces the annual Garma Festival of Traditional Cultures celebrating Yolngu culture from 1999, and their sixth album Garma was released in 2000, with Cal Williams returning on guitars. In 2000, Yothu Yindi performed at the closing ceremony of the Sydney Olympic Games.

On 9 August 2000, 30-year-old Betsy Yunupingu was kicked in the head. She subsequently died, Yothu Yindi band member Gavin Makuma Yunupingu was found guilty of "committing a dangerous act causing death" and in June 2002 he was sentenced to 15 months imprisonment at Berrimah Jail, Darwin. Gavin is the son of Galarrwuy and nephew of Mandawuy.

=== 2001–2020 ===
In May 2001 the Australasian Performing Right Association (APRA), as part of its 75th-anniversary celebrations, named "Treaty" as one of the Top 30 Australian songs of all time. In 2003 Yothu Yindi toured through Northern Territory schools with Mandawuy Yunupingu, yidaki players Gapanbulu Yunupingu and Nicky Yunupingu, and Kellaway using songs, storytelling and open discussions to inspire and encourage some of Australia's most vulnerable young people to attend school and stay healthy. The Yothu Yindi Foundation in May 2007 established the Dilthan Yolngunha (Healing Place) using traditional healing practices and mainstream medicines. On 23 July 2008 a 23-year-old woman was stabbed numerous times; "yidaki" player N. Yunupingu, who was described by Northern Territory police as the offender, was later found dead by hanging. N. Yunupingu was the nephew of both Galarrwuy and Mandawuy Yunupingu, and, as members of Yothu Yindi, they had just played a concert for Prime Minister Kevin Rudd some hours before the stabbing of the woman, who was admitted to hospital, and N. Yunupingu's subsequent death.

In 2009, News.com.au reported that Yothu Yindi lead singer Mandawuy Yunupingu needed a kidney transplant. Yunupingu said he drank up to four cartons of alcohol a day. "Alcohol was a big influence in my life. I didn't know what harm it did to my body. Before I knew, it was too late," he said.

At the ARIA Music Awards of 2012, Yothu Yindi were inducted into the ARIA Hall of Fame, with Peter Garrett (then a former member of Midnight Oil) and Paul Kelly introducing the group.

ARIA chairman and CEO of Sony Music Entertainment Australia and New Zealand, Denis Handlin said "On behalf of the ARIA Board it is with great honour that we induct Yothu Yindi into the ARIA Hall of Fame. Yothu Yindi created a special place in the Nation's heart through their passionate and ground breaking music. Their achievements remain a lasting heritage in both our community and overseas and we look forward to celebrating their induction at the ARIAs in is what is sure to be a magic moment". The group were joined by Garrett, Kelly, Jessica Mauboy and Dan Sultan to perform "Treaty" at the ceremony. In 2019 Double J"s Dan Condon described this as one of "7 great performances from the history of the ARIA Awards."

The "best of" compilation, Healing Stone (The Best of Yothu Yindi), was released in November 2012 which included the new track "Healing Stone", produced by Andrew Farriss of INXS.

On 2 June 2013 lead singer M. Yunupingu died of renal failure. In line with Yolngu cultural protocols, on 4 June 2013 the family requested that the first names of the deceased no longer be used until further notice.

In 2015 they collaborated with rock-reggae band East Journey on a project called The Genesis Project, which included an EP and a performance at the National Indigenous Music Awards 2015.

==== Yothu Yindi and The Treaty Project ====
In 2017, inspired by the 25th anniversary remix of "Treaty (Filthy Lucre remix)", some of the original members of Yothu Yindi, along with several new artists, created an electronica project entitled Yothu Yindi & The Treaty Project (YYATTP). Longtime members Witiyana Marika, Malngay Yunupingu and Stuart Kellaway were joined by blues singer Yirrmal (Marika's son), vocalists Yirrnga Yunupingu and Constantina Bush (aka Kamahi Djordon King), multi-instrumentalist Ania Reynolds (director of Circus Oz) and guitarist Megan Bernard, while the Filthy Lucre duo Nick Coleman and Gavin Campbell worked on mixing and production.

The group played on ABC Radio's The Friday Revue and at the Homeground festival at the Sydney Opera House, which celebrates Indigenous culture (November 2017), and created a hip hop version of Treaty with Baker Boy. Inn January 2018 they were booked to play at the Enmore Theatre with The Herd. They also played Strawberry Fields Festival, Queenscliff Music Festival at the opening night of the Gold Coast 2018 Commonwealth Games, continuing live performances into at least March 2019, including a tour to New Zealand, playing on Waitangi Day 2019 in Auckland.

The group have been described as a "fluid collective", with other musicians quite often joining them on stage. Shane Howard, frontman of the band Goanna, has regularly played with them. They released the Yothu Yindi song "Mabo" for the first time as a single in April 2019.

=== 2021–present ===
On 26 June 2021, Yothu Yindi played at the Yarrapay Festival, which was directed by Witiyana Marika, at Buku-Larrnggay Mulka Art Centre in Yirrkala, along with the Andrew Gurruwiwi Band, Yirrmal, and East Journey.

In August 2023, Yothu Yindi were inducted into the NIMAs (National Indigenous Music Awards) Hall of Fame for their trailblazing contribution to Indigenous music and the rights of First Nations people.

== Members ==
Arranged alphabetically:

- Andrew Belletty – drums
- Hughie Benjamin – drums
- Jodie Cockatoo Creed – vocals
- Matt Cunliffe – keyboards
- Sophie Garrkali – dancer
- Natalie Gillespie – vocals
- Julie Gungunbuy – dancer
- Ben Hakalitz – drums
- Robbie James – guitar
- Stuart Kellaway – bass guitar
- Banula Marika – vocals, dance
- Bunimburr Marika – yidaki (didgeridoo)
- Witiyana Marika – manikay (traditional vocals), bilma (ironwood clapsticks), dancer
- Milkayngu Mununggurr – yidaki
- Tom Neil – harmonica/triangle player
- Buruka Tau-Matagu – keyboards
- Cal Williams – guitar
- Bart Willoughby – drums
- Galarrwuy Yunupiŋu – vocals, bilma, guitar (died 2023)
- Gapanbulu Yunupiŋu – yidaki
- Gavin Makuma Yunupiŋu – yidaki, bilma, vocals
- Geoffrey Gurrumul Yunupiŋu – keyboards, guitar, percussion, yidaki, vocals (died 2017)
- Mandawuy Yunupiŋu – singer-songwriter, guitar (died 2013)
- Malngay Kevin Yunupiŋu – yidaki, bilma, dancer, vocals
- Mangatjay Yunupiŋu – dancer
- Narripapa Nicky Yunupiŋu – yidaki, dancer (died 2008)

== Collaborations and impact ==
Many other musicians apart from Paul Kelly have collaborated or performed with Yothu Yindi, including Jimmy Barnes, Billy Thorpe, members of the Grateful Dead, Midnight Oil, Neil Young, Santana, and Emma Donovan.

Dhapanbal Yunupiŋu, daughter of Mandawuy Yunupiŋu, is a singer-songwriter, who credits the band with providing inspiration to many young Yolngu musicians. Among these are the band King Stingray, whose line-up includes Mandawuy's nephew, Yirrŋa Yunupingu, as lead vocalist, and Stuart Kellaway's son Roy Kellaway on guitar.

== Discography ==
=== Studio albums ===
List of studio albums, with selected chart positions and certifications.
Title	Details	Peak chart positions	Certifications
Title	Details	AUS	Certifications
Homeland Movement	Released: 1989; Label: Mushroom (D19520); Format: LP, CD, Cassette	59	
Tribal Voice	Released: September 1991; Label: Mushroom (D30602); Format: CD, Cassette	4	ARIA: 2× Platinum
Freedom	Released: November 1993; Label: Mushroom (D93380); Format: CD, Cassette	31	
Birrkuta – Wild Honey	Released: November 1996; Label: Mushroom (D93461); Format: CD	92	
One Blood	Released: July 1998; Label: Mushroom (MUSH33229 2); Format: CD	43	
Garma	Released: August 2000; Label: Mushroom (MUSH33282 2); Format: CD	66	
"—" denotes a recording that did not chart or was not released in that territory.

=== Compilation albums ===
Title	Details	Peak chart positions
Title	Details	AUS
Healing Stone (The Best of Yothu Yindi)	Released: November 2012; Label: Festival (LMCD0212); Format: CD, CD+DVD, digital download	88

=== Extended plays ===
Title	Details
The Genesis Project (East Journey featuring Yothu Yindi)	Released: February 2015; Label: East Journey; Format: Digital download

=== Singles ===
List of singles, with selected chart positions and certifications, showing year released and originating album
Single	Year	Chart positions							Certifications	Album
Single	Year	AUS	BEL (FL)	GER	NL	SWI	UK	US Dance	Certifications	Album
"Mainstream"	1989	115	—	—	—	—	—	—		Homeland Movement
"Djäpana (Sunset Dreaming)"	1989	—	—	—	—	—	—	—		Homeland Movement
"Treaty"	1991	—	—	—	—	—	—	—		Tribal Voice
"Treaty" (Filthy Lucre remix)	1991	11	9	—	29	33	72	6	ARIA: Gold	Tribal Voice
"Djäpana (Sunset Dreaming)" (remix)	1992	13	—	—	—	—	—	27	ARIA: Gold	Tribal Voice
"Tribal Voice"	1992	51	—	—	—	—	—	—		Tribal Voice
"World Turning"	1993	56	—	—	—	—	—	—		Freedom
"Timeless Land"	1994	148	—	—	—	—	—	—		Freedom
"Dots on the Shells" (with Neil Finn)	1994	141	—	—	—	—	—	—		Freedom
"Superhighway"	1996	138	—	—	—	—	—	—		Birrkuta – Wild Honey
"Treaty 98" (with Peter Maffay)	1998	—	—	44	—	—	—	—		One Blood
"Mainstream" (featuring Liam Ó Maonlaí)	1998	—	—	—	—	—	—	—		One Blood
"Community Life"	2000	99	—	—	—	—	—	—		Garma
"Romance at Garma"	2000	—	—	—	—	—	—	—		Garma
"Healing Stone"	2012	—	—	—	—	—	—	—		Healing Stone (The Best of Yothu Yindi)
"Ngarrpiya (Octopus)" (with East Journey)	2015	—	—	—	—	—	—	—		The Genesis Project
"Treaty '18" (Yothu Yindi & Gavin Campbell featuring Baker Boy)	2018	—	—	—	—	—	—	—		Non-album single
"—" denotes a recording that did not chart or was not released in that territory.

== Awards ==
- 1991 – Human Rights and Equal Opportunity Commission Songwriting Award for "Treaty".

=== ARIA Awards ===
Yothu Yindi has won eight Australian Recording Industry Association (ARIA) Music Awards from 14 nominations. In 2012 they were inducted into the ARIA Hall of Fame.

Year	Nominee / work	Award	Result
1990	Homeland Movement	Best Indigenous Release	Nominated
1992	Louise Beach / Mushroom Art – Tribal Voice	Best Cover Art	Won
1992	Tribal Voice	Best Indigenous Release	Won
1992	"Treaty (Filthy Lucre Remix)"	Best Video	Nominated
1992	"Treaty (Filthy Lucre Remix)"	Single of the Year	Won
1992	"Treaty"	Song of the Year	Won
1992	David Price, Ted Howard, Greg Henderson, Simon Polinski (for "Maralitja", "Dharpa", "Treaty", "Treaty (Filthy Lucre Remix)", "Tribal Voice")	Engineer of the Year	Won
1993	"Djapana"	Best Indigenous Release	Won
1993	Stephen Maxwell Johnson – "Djapana"	Best Video	Won
1993	Greg Henderson – "Djapana", "Tribal Voice"	Engineer of the Year	Won
1994	Freedom	Best Indigenous Release	Nominated
1995	"Dots on the Shells" (with Neil Finn)	Best Indigenous Release	Nominated
1997	Birrkuta – Wild Honey	Best Indigenous Release	Nominated
2012	Yothu Yindi	ARIA Hall of Fame	inductee

=== Deadly Awards ===
The Deadly Awards, (commonly known simply as The Deadlys), was an annual celebration of Australian Aboriginal and Torres Strait Islander achievement in music, sport, entertainment and community. They ran from 1996 to 2013.

Year	Nominee / work	Award	Result
1997	themselves	Band of the Year	Won
1999	themselves	Band of the Year	Won
2000	Garma	Album of the Year	Won
2001	Yolngu Boy (with Mark Ovenden)	Excellence in Film or Theatrical Score	Won

=== National Indigenous Music Awards ===
The National Indigenous Music Awards recognise excellence, innovation and leadership among Aboriginal and Torres Strait Islander musicians from throughout Australia. They commenced in 2004.

Year	Nominee / work	Award	Result	Ref.
2023	Yothu Yindi	Hall of Fame	inducted	

=== National Live Music Awards ===
The National Live Music Awards (NLMAs) commenced in 2016 to recognise contributions to the live music industry in Australia.

Year	Nominee / work	Award	Result	Ref.
2023	Yothu Yindi	Live Legend Recipient	awarded	

=== Mo Awards ===
The Australian Entertainment Mo Awards (commonly known informally as the Mo Awards), were annual Australian entertainment industry awards. They recognise achievements in live entertainment in Australia from 1975 to 2016. Yothu Yindi won three awards in that time.

Year	Nominee / work	Award	Result (wins only)
1992	Yothu Yindi	Rock Performer of the Year	Won
1992	Yothu Yindi	Australian Performer of the Year	Won
1992	Yothu Yindi	Australian Showbusiness Ambassador	Won
