= Samuel Gaskin =

Australian musician

- Born: New Zealand
- Website: www.samuelgaskin.net

Samuel Gaskin is a New Zealand born musician based in Australia. In 2020 he debuted his stage show RECKŌNING: Te Waiata Paihere Wairua at the Melbourne Fringe Festival, and released a song of the same name as a single in 2021.

== Career ==
Born in New Zealand, Samuel moved to Australia when he was eight months old and grew up around Melbourne. At age 19 he embarked on a career in dancing and in 2008 landed the role as Mowgli in Australian Shakespeare Company's The Jungle Book, his theatre debut.

In 2010 Samuel released music as Sam-G on Triple J Unearthed, a website where independent musicians can share their music. Three of his songs entered the top ten Electronic Chart in May 2010, with his song Gank reaching number one. In 2014 he collaborated with Congo Tardis #1 on their song Marathon, and in 2016 he released two new singles, "Good Enough" and "Love". after signing with Razor Recordings. The songs' creation were funded through Kickstarter and Samuel donated all royalties from "Good Enough"'s Australian digital sales to the mental health organisation Beyond Blue.

In 2020 Samuel and his partner Johnny Hamilton debuted their stage show RECKŌNING: Te Waiata Paihere Wairua at the Melbourne Fringe Festival. Due to the COVID-19 pandemic in Australia, the show was staged without an audience and instead a recording from Hammer Hall was made available to stream. The show, which combines Indigenous Australian and Māori New Zealand song and culture, won four awards, including Best Emerging Indigenous Artist, and toured Brighten Fringe. In 2021 the song RECKŌNING from the show was released as a single and was hailed by Rolling Stone Australia as a "cultural tour de force". The song and video features The Merindas, who also appear in the stage show. At the end of 2021, RECKŌNING: Te Waiata Paihere Wairua returned to the Melbourne Fringe Festival.

Outside of music and theatre, Samuel has acted in several TV series, such as an episode of each of Neighbours and Utopia, and appeared as a judge on All Together Now in 2018.

== Discography ==
Singles

- Good Enough (2016)
- Love (2016)
- RECKŌNING (2021)
- RĀIN (2022)
