= Tribal Voice (song) =

1992 single by Yothu Yindi

Single by Yothu Yindi

from the album Tribal Voice
- Released: 14 September 1992
- Genre: Indigenous Australian
- Length: 4:14
- Label: Mushroom
- Songwriter: Mandawuy Yunupingu
- Producer: Mark Moffatt

Yothu Yindi singles chronology
"Djäpana (Sunset Dreaming)" (remix) (1992)	"Tribal Voice" (1992)	"World Turning" (1993)

Music video
- "Tribal Voice" on YouTube

"Tribal Voice" is a song by Australian musical group Yothu Yindi, released in September 1992 as the third and final single from their second studio album, Tribal Voice. The song peaked at No. 56 on the Australian Singles Chart.

== Track listing ==
Australian CD single

1. "Tribal Voice" – 4:14
2. "Treaty" (K-Klass club mix) – 4:53
3. "Djäpana (Sunset Dreaming)" (The Octopus mix) – 4:36

== Charts ==
Weekly chart performance for "Tribal Voice"
Chart (1992)	Peak position
Australia (ARIA)	51
