= Tasty nightclub raid =

1994 anti-LGBT raid in Melbourne, Australia

Coordinates: 37°49′5.3″S 144°57′48.5″E

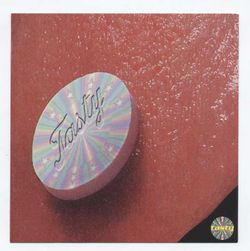
Promotional card from 1994

The Tasty nightclub raid was an incident on 7 August 1994 during which 463 mostly LGBTIQ+ patrons of the Tasty nightclub event in Melbourne, Australia were detained for seven hours, strip searched and cavity searched by members of Victoria Police. A class action ensued, resulting a total payout of around A$6 million to the complainants, and in 2014 Acting Chief Commissioner Lucinda Nolan apologised to the LGBTQI community.

The event has been noted as "Australia's Stonewall", referring to the gay uprising after police raided a club in 1969 in New York.

== Club ==
The Saturday night club event known as Tasty was situated in a five-storey building at 325-331 Flinders Lane, Melbourne, at the rear of the Commerce Club, in the 1990s. It welcomed everyone, but was particularly well attended by LGBTIQ+ people.

Tasty nightclub was produced by Razor Promotions, led by Gavin Campbell. Razor also produced Bump!, Uranus and Temple clubs.

== Raid ==
At 2.10 am on Sunday 7 August 1994, around 40 police officers from Victoria Police raided the club looking for drugs. They used a megaphone to shout orders, and shone their torches in the club patrons' faces. The operation was known as Operation Maze. No patrons were permitted to enter or leave the venue for approximately seven hours. Every one of the 463 patrons and staff were required to strip and the searches were performed in full view of other patrons. Those caught up in the raid described being dragged and frogmarched around the venue, screamed at, abused and bullied, humiliated and intimidated, separated from their friends, forced to stand against walls with their hands up for half an hour or more, stripped and searched in front of other people, and forced to give their names and addresses, before being bundled out the front door, many still only half-clothed.

The raid resulted in two drug-related arrests, but all charges were later dropped. The exact police motivation for the raid is unclear. The predominant sexuality of the events' clientele was well known to police, leading to intense speculation that the club was specifically targeted for reasons grounded in homophobia.

== Reaction ==
A photograph of the incident taken by a patron holding a camera which, in the darkness, had not been seen by police appeared on the front page of Melbourne's The Age newspaper under the headline "Hands Against The Wall". The resulting media attention created a great deal of political controversy, as well as embarrassment to the police force and the Kennett government of the day. The situation brought attention to a police force that had been noted as the most violent in Australia, dating back to 1984. Kennett described the event as "disturbing and extreme".

In November 1994, the deputy ombudsman published a report on the incident, which found that the police officers' actions were "totally unreasonable" and that the club "had been treated differently because of its gay clientele.

Lawyer Anna Brown OAM, now CEO of Equality Australia, campaigned hard for an apology to the queer community for the raid.

== Legal action ==
An action group called COPIT (Casualties of Police Intimidatory Tactics) was formed after the event, and decided to take the matter to the courts.

This led to successful legal action against Victoria Police in May 1996, with damages of well over A$10,000 each awarded to patrons, after the county court found that the police had behaved "unreasonably". The payouts extended to all those affected by the event, totalling about A$6 million, which the government insisted that Victoria Police pay out of its own budget. The amount would have been larger if all of the patrons had joined the action, but several had not wanted to reveal that they were gay.

The class action was run by Gary Singer, (later Deputy Lord Mayor of the City of Melbourne), who was at the club on the night of the raid.

== Legacy ==
The building in which the raid took place, constructed in 1907 as a store, office building and showrooms, is listed in A History of LGBTIQ+ Victoria in 100 Places and Objects, which notes that "it was the response from the community that was most significant".

The event sparked meaningful change. Police-gay community liaison structures were put in place and in August 2014 the Acting Chief Commissioner of Victoria Police offered a public apology for the raid.

It has been described as "Australia's Stonewall", by filmmaker Stephen MacLean and by one of the patrons who was there, Liston.

=== Documentary ===
A 52-minute documentary about the incident was made in 2003 to mark its 10th anniversary, produced by Esben Storm and directed by Stephen MacLean. The Tasty Bust Reunion includes extensive interviews and insights with patrons, club owners and employees. The documentary was screened on SBS television Australia and released on DVD. It was released in the United States and Canada in June 2004.

=== Apology ===
On the 20th anniversary of the Tasty Nightclub Raid, Acting Chief Commissioner Lucinda Nolan apologised to the LGBTI community at the Victoria Police Museum, offering a "sincere apology" on behalf of the Victoria Police for the distress caused.

== See also ==
- New South Wales Police Force strip search scandal
