= Mandawuy Yunupingu =

Australian musician (1956–2013)

- Gudjuk
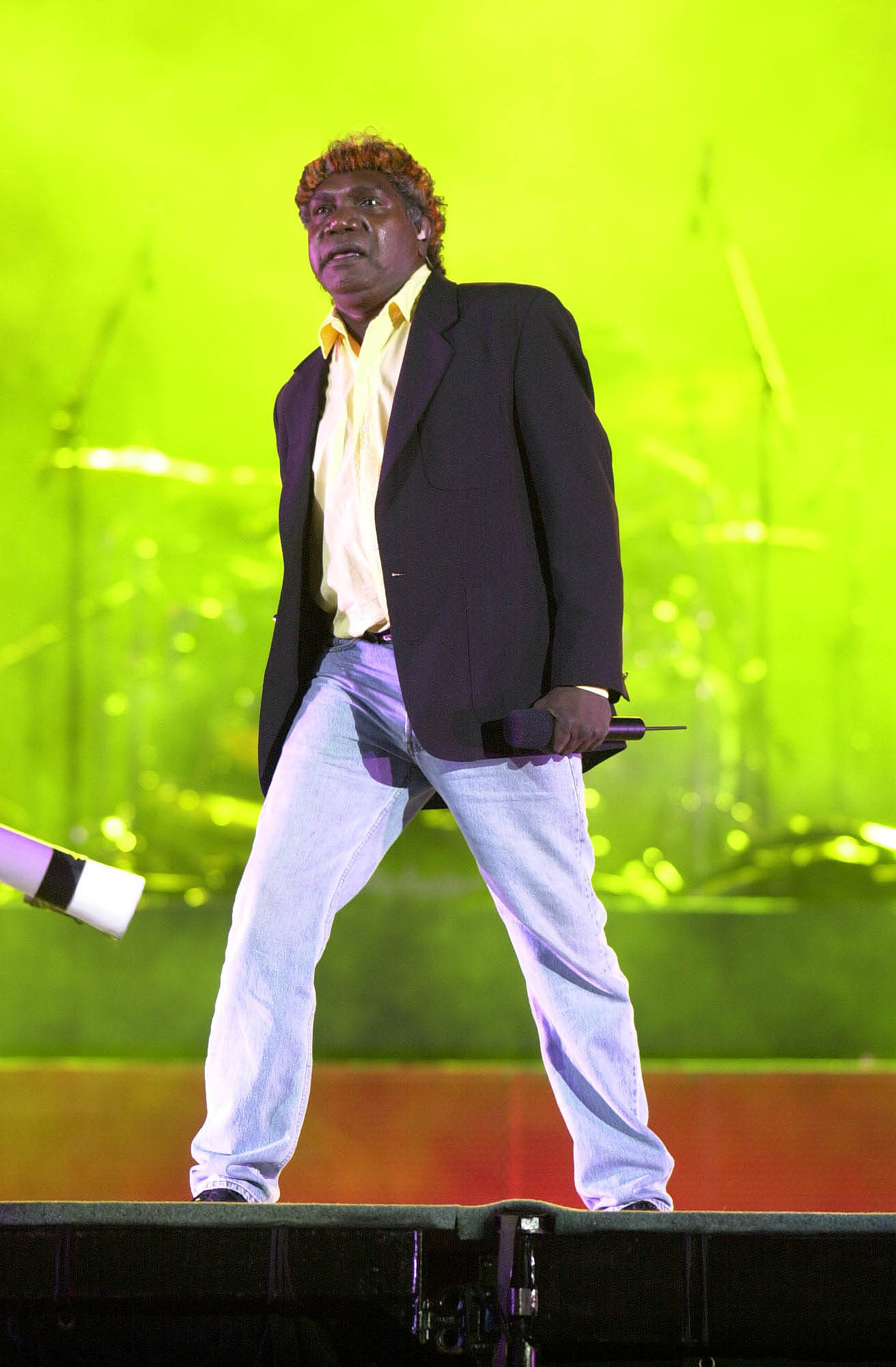
- Yunupingu performing with Yothu Yindi during the 2000 Summer Paralympics Opening Ceremonies
- Born: Tom Djambayang Bakamana Yunupingu; 17 September 1956; Yirrkala, Northern Territory, Australia
- Died: 2 June 2013 (aged 56); Yirrkala, Northern Territory, Australia
- Other names: Gudjuk, Dr Yunupingu
- Occupations: Musician, school principal
- Years active: 1985–2013
- Father: Mungurrawuy Yunupingu
- Musical career
- Genre: Aboriginal rock
- Instruments: Guitar, vocals
- Formerly of: Yothu Yindi

Mandawuy Djarrtjuntjun Yunupingu AC, formerly Tom Djambayang Bakamana Yunupingu, and also known as Dr Yunupingu (17 September 1956 – 2 June 2013), was a teacher and musician, and frontman of the Aboriginal rock group Yothu Yindi from 1986. He was an Aboriginal Australian man of the Yolŋu people, with a skin name of Gudjuk.

Yunupingu was a singer-songwriter and guitarist with the band. Yothu Yindi released six albums between 1989 and 2000, and their top 20 ARIA Singles Chart appearances were "Treaty" (1991) and "Djäpana (Sunset Dreaming)" (1992). The band was inducted into the ARIA Hall of Fame in 2012.

In 1989, Yunupingu became assistant principal of the Yirrkala Community School and was principal for the following two years. He helped establish the Yolngu Action Group and introduced the both-ways education system, which recognised traditional Aboriginal teaching alongside Western methods. His wife Yalmay Yunupingu taught alongside him at the school.

Yunupingu was appointed Australian of the Year for 1992 by the National Australia Day Council. In 1993, he was one of six Indigenous Australians who jointly presented the Boyer Lectures "Voices of the Land" for the International Year for the World's Indigenous People. In April 1998, he was awarded an honorary doctorate by the Queensland University of Technology.

== Early life, family, and education ==
Yunupingu was born as Tom Djambayang Bakamana Yunupingu on 17 September 1956 in Yirrkala, Arnhem Land, an Aboriginal reserve in the northeastern part of the Northern Territory. He was a member of the Gumatj people, one of sixteen groups of the Yolngu people. His skin name was Gudjuk, but his name was changed to Mandawuy in 1990 when a family member with the same name died, in line with Yolngu custom. He described his names thus: "Mandawuy means 'from clay'; Djarrtjuntjun means 'roots of the paperbark tree that still burn and throw off heat after a fire has died down'; Yunupingu depicts a solid rock that, having travelled from freshwater, stands in salty waters, its base deep in the earth. I am Gudjuk the fire kite."

His father was Munggurrawuy Yunupingu (c. 1907–1978), a Gumatj clan leader and artist. His mother, Makurrngu – one of Munggurrawuy's 12 wives – was a member of the Galpu clan. His oldest sister, Gulumbu Yunupingu (1945 – 9 May 2012), was also an artist and healer. His other sisters are Nyapanyapa and Barrupu, who are also artists. His older brother, Galarrwuy Yunupingu (1948 – 2023), a senior elder of Arnhem Land, was Australian of the Year in 1978, and was an Indigenous land rights campaigner.

Yunupingu attended Yirrkala Community School.

== Teaching ==
In 1983, Yunupingu published "Outstation schools at Yirrkala" in Aboriginal Child at School, where he described the advantages to Indigenous people by "[determining] their own way of living, provided, they manage budgeting through Isolated Children's Allowance, staffing their schools, developing curriculum, and teacher training". In March 1987 he contributed to the book, Educational needs of the Homelands Centres of the L̲aynhapuy Region, North East Arnhem Land : report of the Balanga ̲na Project : a Schools Commission Project of national significance.

He was the first Aboriginal person from Arnhem Land to gain a university degree, earning a Bachelor of Arts degree in education from Deakin University in 1988. In 1989 he became assistant principal of the Yirrkala Community School. He helped establish the Yolngu Action Group and introduced the both-ways system at his school, which recognised traditional Aboriginal teaching alongside Western methods. In 1990 he took over as principal of Yirrkala Community School. Also that year he authored "Language and power: The Yolngu Rise to Power at Yirrkala School," detailing his work with Yolngu Action Group. He remained principal until late 1991, leaving to expand his musical career.

In 1992, Yunupingu worked with rock musician Jimmy Barnes on a project called "Sister Schools," the aim of which was to ensure that "schools with few or no Aboriginal children will forge educational and social links with schools with large numbers of Aboriginal children, in an attempt to foster tolerance and understanding." Before the launch of the project, "the Yunupingu kids" (Mandawuy's children) recorded a song written by Yunupingu called "School" with Barnes' children in their band The Tin Lids. As part of the project, endorsed by the government, schools with few or no Aboriginal children would forge educational and social links with schools with many Aboriginal children, by exchanging letters, photographs, and other media. Around 100 schools expressed interest in the project, which was launched in August 1992 by connecting the school in Yirrkala with Gib Gate Primary School near Mittagong in New South Wales. In 1994, a primary school in Deloraine, Tasmania, hosted a group of children from Ali Curung, NT, for six days as part of the scheme.

His wife, Yalmay Yunupingu, taught at the school for around 40 years before her retirement in 2023, and was also a dedicated teacher and mentor in bilingual education.

== Yothu Yindi ==
By 1985, with Yunupingu on vocals and guitar, he formed a Yolngu band including Witiyana Marika on manikay (traditional vocals), bilma (ironwood clapsticks) and dance, Milkayngu Mununggurr on yidaki (didgeridoo), and his nephew Gurrumul Yunupingu on keyboards, guitar and percussion. The following year the Yolngu group combined with a balanda (non-Indigenous) group, Swamp Jockeys, which had Andrew Belletty on drums, Stuart Kellaway on bass guitar and Cal Williams on lead guitar. The new collective, Yothu Yindi, performed Aboriginal rock which fused traditional indigenous music and dance with Western popular music. Yothu yindi means "child and mother" and refers to the kinship of north-east Arnhem Land.

In the group's early years, their performing was restricted to holidays while Yunupingu completed his tertiary studies and then started work as a teacher. By 1988, Yothu Yindi had toured Australia and North America supporting Midnight Oil. Late that year they recorded their debut studio album, Homeland Movement, which appeared in March the following year. Australian musicologist Ed Nimmervoll described it "[o]ne side comprised Midnight Oil–like politicized rock. The other side of the album concentrated on traditionally based songs like "Djäpana" (Sunset Dreaming), written by former teacher Mandawuy Yunupingu". He was credited on the album as Mandawuy Bakamana Yunupingu and provided vocals, guitar and bilma.

The band achieved national recognition for their single "Treaty"; the remixed version was released in June 1991, which reached No. 11 on the ARIA Singles Chart and stayed in the top 50 for 20 weeks. Mandawuy and Galarrwuy had wanted a song to highlight the lack of progress on a treaty between Aboriginal peoples and the federal government. The song contains words in Gumatj, Yunupingu's variety of Yolngu matha. It was primarily written by Australian musician Paul Kelly, with additional writing by Yothu Yindi members Yunupingu, Kellaway, Williams, Gurrumul, Mununggurr, and Marika. The associated album, Tribal Voice, appeared in October 1991 and peaked at No. 4 on the ARIA Albums Chart. A re-recorded version of "Djäpana (Sunset Dreaming)" was issued as the second single from the album and reached No. 13.

Yunupingu's work on Tribal Voice was described by Allmusic's Jonathan Lewis: "[his] voice is suited perfectly to [traditional songs], but it is the rock tracks that are the weak links in this disc. Yunupingu is not a particularly good pop singer, and the music is sometimes insipid." Nevertheless both "Treaty" in 1992 and "Djäpana (Sunset Dreaming)" in 1993 charted on the Billboard Hot Dance Club Play singles charts, with "Treaty" peaking at No. 6, Tribal Voice peaked at No. 3 on the Billboard Top World Music Albums chart in 1992. In 1991, "Treaty," co-written by Yunupingu, won the inaugural Song of the Year Award at the APRA Music Awards presented by Australasian Performing Right Association. In May 2001, it was listed in the APRA Top 30 Australian songs of all time.

Yothu Yindi completed four more studio albums, Freedom (November 1993), Birrkuta – Wild Honey (November 1996), One Blood (June 1999) and Garma (November 2000). They toured Australia, North America, New Zealand, United Kingdom, Papua New Guinea and Hong Kong. Yunupingu strove to achieve a better understanding of Aboriginal culture by balanda and was a prominent advocate of reconciliation between all Australians.

Yunupingu and the band established the Yothu Yindi Foundation in 1990; and, since 1999, it has promoted the annual Garma Festival. From May 2007, the foundation has supported the Dilthan Yolngunha (Healing Place), which uses a combination of traditional healing practices and mainstream medicine.

== Recognition and awards ==
- On 26 January 1993, Yunupingu was named Australian of the Year for 1992 by the National Australia Day Council.
- In 1993, one of Yunupingu's friends, filmmaker Stephen Maxwell Johnson (Yolngu Boy, High Ground), made a feature-length documentary about him called Tribal Voice.
- In April 1998, he was awarded an honorary doctorate by the Queensland University of Technology, "in recognition of his significant contribution to the education of Aboriginal children, and to greater understanding between Aboriginal and non-Aboriginal Australians".
- On 1 January 2001, Yunupingu awarded the Centenary Medal for service to Australian society through music.
- Yunupingu was inducted into the NT Hall of Fame at the NT Indigenous Music Awards 2004. Yothu Yindi were inducted into the ARIA Hall of Fame in December 2012, with Peter Garrett (frontman of Midnight Oil) and Paul Kelly introducing the group.
- In the 2014 Australia Day Honours, Yunupingu was posthumously invested as a Companion of the Order of Australia (AC), for eminent service to the performing arts as a musician and songwriter, to the advancement of education and social justice for Indigenous people, and as an advocate for cultural exchange and understanding.

== Death and legacy ==
Yunupingu died on 2 June 2013, aged 56, following a long battle with kidney disease. After his death, the Prime Minister of Australia at the time, Julia Gillard, said: "We have today lost a great Australian voice in the efforts towards reconciliation."

In June 2014, the annual Dr Yunupingu Award for Human Rights was created as one of three awards at the newly-established National Indigenous Human Rights Awards in Sydney, New South Wales. His wife Yalmay delivered one of the keynote speeches at the inaugural awards ceremony on 24 June.

On 17 September 2020, Google celebrated Yunupingu's 64th birthday with a Google Doodle.

== Personal life and family ==
Yunupingu was married to a fellow teacher, Yalmay Marika Yunupingu of the Rirritjingu clan, also referred to as Yalmay Marika and Yalmay Yunupingu. He is survived by five daughters and five grandsons.

Yunupingu was friends with musician Jimmy Barnes, with the men working together on "Sister Schools", a federal government program initiated by Aboriginal Affairs Minister Robert Tickner, which aimed to link Aboriginal and non-Aboriginal schoolchildren around the country. The children of both men sang together as The Tin Lids and The Yunupingu Kids, on a song called "School" in August 1992.

One of his grandsons, Rrawun Maymuru, is lead singer of East Journey. In May 2013, the National Indigenous Music Awards announced that Yothu Yindi were to be honoured at their awards ceremony in August, in which Maymuru was to be backed by original band members. Yunupingu declared "My heart is full of joy. I am so happy to see that in my lifetime Indigenous music has come such a long way. And to have these talented artists come together to honour the groundbreaking work of Yothu Yindi makes me proud beyond words. Yow Manymak."

His nephew Geoffrey Gurrumul Yunupingu also played in Yothu Yindi. Gurrumul later formed the Saltwater Band and also had a solo career. Other members of the extended Yunupingu family have also performed in Yothu Yindi: Galarrwuy (guitars and vocals); Mangatjay (dance); Yomunu; Gapanbulu (yidaki); Gavin Makuma (yidaki, bilma, vocals); Malngay Kevin (yidaki, bilma, dancer, vocals); and Narripapa Nicky (yidaki, dancer). His nephew, Gavin Makuma Yunupingu, was jailed in 2002 over the death of Betsy Yunupingu, his cousin. Another nephew, Nicky Yunupingu, died by suicide in July 2008.

=== Health ===
Yunupingu was diagnosed with diabetes and high blood pressure, which in turn contributed to advanced kidney failure, for which he received haemodialysis three times a week in Darwin. His condition was announced in 2007 following his attendance in January at a rehabilitation clinic after years of beer drinking – between one and four cartons (i.e. two to eight gallons, or 9 to 36 litres) daily, according to his psychiatrist. By December 2008 he was resigned to the fact that he may die without having seen the longed-for settlement between white and black Australia:

I'm still waiting for that treaty to come along, for my grandsons, ... Even if it's not there in the days that I am living, it might come in the days that I am not living. I know a treaty will change things, my grandsons will have a different view, a much more positive view, a luckier view. Luckier in that they feel part of Australia, you know

— Mandawuy Yunupingu, 6 December 2008, The Australian.

By October 2009 he was on a kidney transplant waiting list. He also undertook traditional healing practices. His sister Gulumbu was one of a group of senior Yolngu women who had helped set up Dilthan Yolngunha – a healing place – with the support of the Yothu Yindi Foundation. Yunupingu was one of its first patients.

== Bibliography ==
- Yunupingu, Mandawuy; Yunupingu, Djoki; Yirrkala School Literature Production Centre (1977), Bewiyik ga ngän̲uk, Literature Production Centre
- Yunupingu, Bakamana (1986), "(1) Marrmawuy wungganbuy dhawu; [Story about two dogs] by Bakamana", in Yirrkala Community School (ed.), Stories from Yirrkala, Yirrkala Literature Production Centre
- Mununggurr, Daymbalipu; Kemmis, Stephen; Wunungmurra, Wali; Yunupingu, Bakamana; Watson, Helen; Commonwealth Schools Commission (Australia). Projects of National Significance Program; Laynhapuy Association (March 1987), Educational needs of the Homelands Centres of the L̲aynhapuy Region, North East Arnhem Land : report of the Balanga ̲na Project : a Schools Commission Project of national significance, Laynhapuy Association
- Yunupingu, Bakamana (1990). "Language and power : the Yolngu rise to power at Yirrkala School". In Walton, Christine; Eggington, William (eds.). Cross-Cultural Issues in Educational Linguistics Conference (1987; Batchelor College, N.T.) Language; maintenance, power and education in Australian Aboriginal contexts. Darwin: NTU Press. pp. 3–6.
- Anderson, Jonathon, ed. (1992), Education for a sustainable society: papers presented at the 31st National Conference of the Australian College of Education, Canberra, 1991, Australian College of Education (ACE), ISBN 978-0-909587-64-2
- Fesl, Eve D (1993), Conned!, Munduwuy (Mandawuy) Bakamana Yunupingu ("Appendix: statement on language and power"), University of Queensland Press, ISBN 978-0-7022-2497-3
- Yunupingu, Mandawuy; Australian Broadcasting Corporation (1994), Voices from the land, AbC Books for the Australian Broadcasting Corporation, ISBN 978-0-7333-0344-9
- Yunupingu, Mandawuy; Australia. Department of Employment, Education and Training; Reference Group Overseeing the National Review of Education for Aboriginal and Torres Strait Islander People (1994), National review of education for Aboriginal and Torres Strait Islander peoples: statistical annex, Australian Government Publishing Service, ISBN 978-0-644-35414-1
- Yunupingu, Mandawuy (1994), Yothu Yindi: finding balance
- Yunupingu, Mandawuy; Quirk, Philip, 1948– (1997), Wild light : images of Australia, Hamlyn, ISBN 978-0-947334-78-9
- Mandawuy, Yunupingu (1999), "Double power", in Wignell, Peter (ed.), Double power: English literacy and indigenous education, Language Australia, pp. 1–4, ISBN 978-1-875578-92-4
- Yunupingu, Mandawuy (2000), "A balance in knowledge: respecting difference", in Kleinert, Sylvia; Neale, Margo; Bancroft, Robyne (eds.), The Oxford companion to Aboriginal art and culture, Melbourne: Oxford University Press, pp. 493–496, ISBN 978-0-19550-649-5
- Corn, Aaron David Samuel; Yunupingu, Mandawuy; Langton, Marcia; National Recording Project for Indigenous Performance in Australia (2009), Reflections & voices: exploring the music of Yothu Yindi with Mandawuy Yunupingu, Sydney University Press, ISBN 978-1-920899-34-9
