= One Blood (Yothu Yindi album) =

Studio album by Yothu Yindi
- Released: July 1998
- Recorded: 1998
- Studios: Totally Wired Studios, Dublin, Ireland; Red Rooster Tonstudio, Tutzing, Germany; The Shepherd Street Studio, Darwin, Australia
- Labels: Epic; Mushroom
- Producers: Carl Carlton; Bertram Engel

Yothu Yindi chronology
Birrkuta – Wild Honey (1996)	One Blood (1998)	Garma (2000)

Singles from One Blood
- 1. "Treaty 98" Released: 1998; 2. "Mainstream" Released: 1998

One Blood is the fifth studio album by Australian group, Yothu Yindi that was released internationally in 1998 via Epic Records and in Australia in July 1999. The album peaked at number 43 on the ARIA charts.

The album saw the travel overseas and work with different musicians and in different studios, re-recording some of their earlier hits.

== Track listing ==
1. "Laykarrambu" (Traditional song, arranged by Mandawuy Yunupingu, Yomunu Yunupingu)
2. "One Blood" (M. Yunupingu, P. Kelly)
3. "Mainstream" (M. Yunupingu) (featuring Liam O'Maonlai)
4. "World Turning" (M. Yunupingu, Witiyana Marika)
5. "Baywara" (M. Yunupingu, Stuart Kellaway)
6. "Dots on the Shells" (M. Yunupingu, Neil Finn) (featuring Jim Kerr)
7. "Rrama" (Traditional song, arranged by Galarrwuy Yunupingu, Milkayngu Mununggurr)
8. "Djäpana (Sunset Dreaming)" (M. Yunupingu)
9. "Written on a Bark" (M. Yunupingu, Kellaway)
10. "Tribal Voice" (M. Yunupingu)
11. "7 Sisters" (M. Yunupingu)
12. "Minga Minga" (Traditional song, arranged by M. Yunupingu, Y. Yunupingu)
13. "Tears for Law (Garrathiya Run)" (M. Yunupingu, Daniel Watson)
14. "Baru" (Traditional song, arranged by G. Yunupingu, Mununggurr)
15. "Belief in the Future" (Kellaway, M.G. Yunupingu, C. Holt)
16. "Nyinga Nyinga" (Traditional song, arranged by G. Yunupingu, Mununggurr)
17. "Our Land" (M. Yunupingu, Kellaway)
18. "Yarryurru" (Traditional song, arranged by G. Yunupingu, Mununggurr)
19. "Treaty 98" (M. Yunupingu, G. Yunupingu, Mununggurr, Marika, Kellaway, Cal Williams, Kelly, Peter Garrett)

== Charts ==
Chart performance for One Blood
Chart (1999)	Peak position
Australian Albums (ARIA)	43

== Release history ==
Release history and formats for One Blood
Country	Date	Format	Label	Catalogue
Europe	1998	CD	Epic	491768-2
Australia	July 1999	CD	Mushroom	MUSH33229.2
