= Garma (album) =

Studio album by Yothu Yindi
- Released: August 2000
- Recorded: 2000
- Label: Mushroom
- Producer: Andrew Farriss

Yothu Yindi chronology
One Blood (1998)	Garma (2000)	Healing Stone (The Best of Yothu Yindi) (2012)

Singles from Garma
- 1. "Community Life" Released: July 2000; 2. "Romance at Garma" Released: 2000

Garma is the sixth and final studio album by Australian band Yothu Yindi. It was released in August 2000 via Mushroom Records. The album peaked at number 66 on the ARIA Charts.

== Track listing ==
1. "Macassan Crew" (Mandawuy Yunupingu, Stuart Kellaway, Jodie Cockatoo Creed, Andrew Farriss)
2. "Fire" (Mandawuy Yunupingu, Kellaway, Cockatoo Creed, Farriss)
3. "Surfin' The Log" (Mandawuy Yunupingu, Kellaway, Cockatoo Creed, Farriss)
4. "Community Life" (Mandawuy Yunupingu, Kellaway, Cockatoo Creed, Farriss)
5. "Bush" (Mandawuy Yunupingu, Farriss)
6. "Ghost Spirits" (Kellaway, Makuma Yunupingu, Mandawuy Yunupingu, Lamar Lowder)
7. "Romance at Garma" (Mandawuy Yunupingu, Kellaway, Cockatoo Creed, Farriss)
8. "Good Medicine" (Cockatoo Creed, Farriss)
9. "Calling Every Nation" (Mandawuy Yunupingu, Cockatoo Creed, Farriss)
10. "Wirrkul Girl" (Mandawuy Yunupingu, Farriss)
11. "Lonely Tree" (Mandawuy Yunupingu, Kellaway, Cockatoo Creed, Farriss)
12. "Gone Is The Land" (Mandawuy Yunupingu, Gurrumul Yunupingu, Farriss)
13. "Silver Owl" (Mandawuy Yunupingu, Kellaway)
14. "Gawulny (Silver Light)" (Traditional song, arranged by Mandawuy Yunupingu)

== Personnel ==
- Mandawuy Yunupingu – lead and backing vocals, clapsticks
- Jodie Cockatoo Creed – lead and backing bocals
- Makuma Yunupingu – lead vocals
- Rrawun Maymuru – backing vocals, didgeridoo, clapsticks
- Gapanbulu Yunupingu Mununggurr – didgeridoo
- Yomunu Yunupingu – didgeridoo
- Stuart Kellaway – clapsticks, bass, guitars, backing vocals
- Cal Williams – electric/acoustic guitars
- Gurrumul Yunupingu – electric/acoustic guitars
- Ben Hakalitz – drums
- Scott Saunders – keyboards
- Andrew Farriss – keyboards, guitars, bass, harmonica
- Joe Accaria – drums
- Nick Cicere – drums
- Anja Tait – violin
- Michele Rose – pedal steel
- Mark Williams – backing vocals
- Tina Harrod – backing vocals

== Charts ==
Chart performance for Garma
Chart (2000)	Peak position
Australian Albums (ARIA)	66

== Release history ==
Release history and formats for Garma
Country	Date	Format	Label	Catalogue
Australia	August 2000	CD	Mushroom	MUSH33282-2
