= Anna Brown (lawyer) =

Australian lawyer and advocate

Anna Shelley Brown OAM (born 1979) is a lawyer and advocate, particularly in the area of LGBTIQ rights. After working for the Human Rights Law Centre for around seven years, in December 2018 she was appointed chief executive of new LGBTI advocacy organisation Equality Australia

== Early life ==
Brown was born in 1979 and grew up in suburban Melbourne before studying politics and law at Monash University. She became president of the Law Students' Society, and played in the 'Victorian Women's Football League.

== Career ==
After a time working in corporate law with Allens Arthur Robertson, she worked for the Federal Court of Australia as a Judge's Associate to Justice Steven Rares. She has also been an adviser to former Victorian Attorney-General and Deputy Premier, Rob Hulls.

She campaigned hard for an apology to the gay community for the Tasty nightclub raid of 1994, which eventually came in 2014.

She joined the Human Rights Law Centre (HRLC) in 2011, and has led much of its work on LGBTI rights, marriage equality, gender recognition, and equality law reform, including an amicus curiae intervention in the case of Norrie May Welby in the High Court. Until December 2018, she was Director of Legal Advocacy at HRLC.

Brown was co-chair of the Equality Campaign during the Australian Marriage Law Postal Survey in 2017. Brown ran a constitutional challenge in the High Court on the marriage plebiscite, on behalf of Australian Marriage Equality. She has previously held the position of Co-Convener of the Victorian Gay and Lesbian Rights Lobby.

In December 2018 Brown she was appointed inaugural chief executive of new LGBTI advocacy organisation Equality Australia.

She has spoken of a need for a national Bill of Rights or Human Rights Act. in 2018 and 2019 she held the position of co-chair of the Justice Working Group of the Victorian Government's LGBTI Taskforce. In this capacity, Brown advocated for trans people to be able to change their sex on their birth certificate, without the certification of a psychologist or physician.

== Recognition ==
Brown was named Victorian GLBTI person of the year in November 2014, in the first GLOBE community awards. She was also a finalist for the Tony Fitzgerald Community Award in the 2014 Australian Human Rights Awards, a finalist in Victorian Australian of the Year in 2015 and winner of the Tim McCoy Award in 2015.

In the 2019 Queen's Birthday Honours Brown was awarded the Medal of the Order of Australia (OAM) for "service to human rights, and to the LGBTIQ community". In October 2019 she was named winner of the Social Enterprise and Not-for-profit category in The Australian Financial Review's 100 Women of Influence awards.
