= Witiyana Marika =

Aboriginal Australian musician and filmmaker

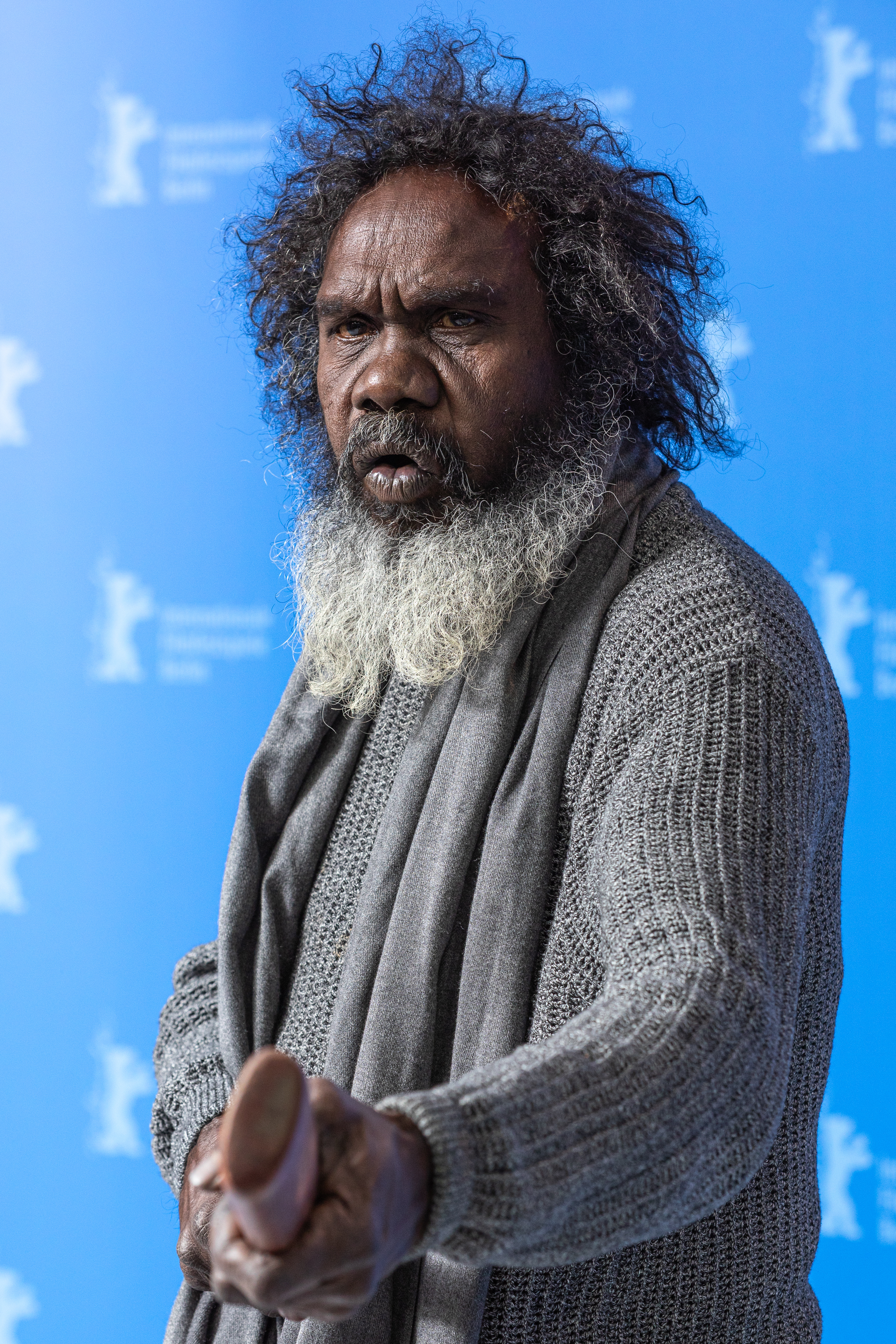
- Marika in 2020
- Born: 1961 (age 64–65); East Arnhem Land, Northern Territory, Australia
- Occupations: Musician, dancer, elder
- Years active: 1986–present
- Known for: Founding member of Yothu Yindi
- Parent(s): Roy Dadaynga Marika (father); Eunice Djerrkngu Yunupingu (mother)

Witiyana Marika (born 1961) is an Aboriginal Australian musician (for which he was dubbed "the black Elvis"), filmmaker and elder, known for being a founding member of the band Yothu Yindi and producer of the film High Ground.

== Early life and family ==
Witiyana Marika was born in 1961 into the Rirratjingu clan of the Yolngu people of Arnhem Land, Northern Territory of Australia, a member of the Marika family. His father was land rights activist Roy Dadaynga Marika, who was famously involved in the Yirrkala bark petitions in 1963 and the Gove land rights case in 1971, which was the first significant legal case for Aboriginal land rights in Australia. His mother was noted artist Ms. D. (Djerrkngu) Eunice Yunupingu (c.1945–2022), whose sisters included artists Gulumbu Yunupingu, Barrupu Yunupingu, and Nancy Gaymala Yunupingu, among others.

Marika was raised in Yirrkala, where he was immersed in Yolngu culture and songs, learning to play clapsticks and singing along with the elders. He spoke 13 Indigenous dialects before learning English. His name means "morning star", which is of cultural significance to Yolngu peoples, as Barnumbirr, their name for the planet Venus.

Marika is also a son by lore of the actor David Gulpilil (deceased 2021), and Mandawuy Yunupingu was his uncle.

== Music career ==
Marika's uncle, Mandawuy Yunupingu, spotted his nephew singing and dancing, and asked him to join him in a new band, which was Yothu Yindi, formed in 1986. Marika sang in traditional style, singing clan songs of the Yolngu people known as manikay, played bilma clapsticks, and danced.

Marika was an international star in his 20s. He was dubbed "the black Elvis" owing to his "onstage swagger and electric smile". The band's most famous song was about Indigenous land rights in Australia, called "Treaty". Re-released in 1991, it was the first song by an Indigenous-led band to achieve chart success in Australia, and reached number 6 on the US's Billboard Hot Dance Club songs. Yothu Yindi toured the world, including a performance at the United Nations in New York for the launch of International Year for the World's Indigenous People in 1993. The huge cultural change and rock and roll lifestyle took its toll, and he abused alcohol at times, leading him to return home and aim to be a cultural leader.

In 2017, along with fellow longtime members Malngay Yunupingu and Stuart Kellaway and several new musicians, including his son Yirrmal, he played in Yothu Yindi & The Treaty Project, with the newly-formed band performing live across Australia into 2019.

In 2021 Marika, by then a clan elder, directed the Yarrapay Festival at Buku-Larrngay, where he played with Yothu Yindi. He continues to perform as a musician as of March 2026.

== Film ==
Marika played the role of the grandfather as well as being co-producer and senior cultural advisor to the film High Ground, which took around 20 years to make and is based on true events, about a massacre of Yolngu people in the early 1900s. The film was directed by Stephen Maxwell Johnson, who is a friend of Marika since they met in 1989 and who had made the music video for the Yothu Yind's second single, "Djäpana", which won an ARIA award. Taking part in the project was important to Marika, as he is passionate about the necessity to educate broader Australia about past history of massacres and colonial violence. As a teenager, as part of a ceremony undertaken with his grandfather on their homeland Gäṉgän (Gan Gan), he was taught about the massacre of over 100 people of his grandmother’s clan, Dhalwaŋu. He had further researched the details of the massacre with his friend and cousin Dr M. Yunupingu, who shared the same grandmother. Two men survived the massacre by hiding in the water and using rushes to breathe through, a trick used by a little boy in the film.

Marika said the film was taking his people's story to the world, in the same way that Yothu Yindi took their music to the world. He played an essential role in navigating relations between the mostly white ("balanda") filmmakers and the traditional owners of Cannon Hill, Gunbalanya and Gunlom, where filming took place and permissions were needed to access the land.

== As elder ==
After his father became gravely ill, at the height of Yothu Yindi's fame, Marika returned home. After a car crash caused by drunkenness in which his son was involved, Marika resolved to become sober, to return to culture, and become an elder.

He rose to become a respected elder of the Rirratjingu clan, and a senior ceremonial leader and a teacher of songlines and ceremonies for his clan and community. Will Stubbs, director of Yirrkala Arts Centre, likens his roles to those of archbishop, High Court judge, professor, counsellor, and lord mayor, embodied in one person. With challenges ahead, as the Gove bauxite mine closes down and royalties dry up, Marika remains committed to unity and harmony among the various clans.

He has worked as a co-presenter in cross-cultural education, delivering seminars to businesses and academia. He was formerly vice chair of the Aboriginal Resource Development Services (ARDS) and chair of Buku-Larrngay Mulka Arts Centre Committee and Dhimurru Land Management. As of 2021 he was a director of Rirratjingu Mining Pty Ltd and Rirratjingu Investments Pty Ltd.

In mid-2021 Marika became a board member of the North East Arnhem Land Aboriginal Corporation, which represents the 26 Yolngu clans of the region, and remains a member as of March 2026. As of March 2026 he is cultural advisor to the Rirratjingu Aboriginal Corporation.

== Personal life and family ==
Marika has two wives (as of 2014), as is customary among Yolngu people, in order to form larger clans and stronger families. Marika says that the women are treated equally, and there are many benefits to growing up in a large extended family. His wife Dipililnga Bukulatjpi is the mother of artist Burrthi Marika, and blues singer Yirrmal is Marika's son.

He suffers from rheumatic heart disease; his symptoms were improved after open heart surgery.
