= Stephen Maxwell Johnson =

Australian film and television director

- Occupation: Film director
- Years active: 2000–present
- Known for: Yolngu Boy (2001); High Ground (2020)

Stephen Maxwell Johnson is an Australian filmmaker, best known for his films Yolngu Boy (2001) and High Ground (2020). He is also known for directing Yothu Yindi's music videos in the late 1980s to early 1990s.

== Early life and education ==
Johnson was born in England. His parents were teachers, who worked in several places around the world. He grew up in the Bahamas, Africa and the Northern Territory (NT) of Australia. His father became a senior teacher at Kormilda College, a secondary school for Aboriginal students in Darwin, and Johnson made friends with many of the students there. He has spoken of his appreciation of his "incredible childhood growing up in the wild and all of those countries and then being immersed also in the culture of those countries, particularly very, very intimately with Aboriginal culture [in Australia]".

He has spent most of his life in Arnhem Land, where he became friends with Witiyana Marika when quite young. He also learnt much about the history of the area from the Aboriginal perspective, which involved "chaos" and massacres of Indigenous people, although this was not taught at his school.

Johnson went to an acting school in London, where he also trained as a cameraman, before returning to the NT with the aim of making his first film.

== Career ==
Johnson began his film and television career as a trainee cameraman at Channel 9. He established a production facility called Burrundi Pictures with co-director Maggie Miles, and narrow cast television station in Darwin, and started directing, producing and photographing drama, documentaries, television commercials, animated films, corporate films and music videos the country, including in remote communities in the NT.

In the late 1980s and early 1990s, Johnson directed music videos by Yolngu and balanda (non-Aboriginal) band Yothu Yindi. His friend Witiyana Marika is a founding member of the band. At the 1993 ARIA Awards, Johnson won the "Best Video" award for the band's single "Djäpana (Sunset Dreaming)". He also directed the feature-length documentary Tribal Voice (1993) (the name of Yothu Yindi's second album as well as a song of the same name), about close friend Mandawuy Yunupingu AC, singer/ songwriter with Yothu Yindi.

Johnson's debut feature film was Yolngu Boy, released in 2001, which was well reviewed by Margaret Pomeranz and others and earned a score of 78% on review aggregator Rotten Tomatoes.

Johnson said that High Ground was 20 years in the making, having first talked about his ideas for the film with Patricia Edgar, founding director of the Australian Children's Television Foundation, in the mid-1990s. At that time his working title was The Resistance, but Edgar advised that funding for such a film would not be available for such a film at that time, and led him into making Yolngu Boy instead, which could be funded under a specific grant. Johnson's friend Witiyana Marika was co-producer and senior cultural adviser, and also played the part of Grandfather Dharrpa. Maggie Miles, Johnson's co-founder of Burrundi Pictures was a producer on the film. The film is extremely close to his heart, a "passion project", as revealed in several interviews and the question-and-answer panel following a showing of the film at the National Film and Sound Archive in March 2021.

== Recognition and accolades ==
The Film Critics Circle of Australia named High Ground the Best Australian Film of 2021, and it earned eight AACTA Award nominations. Yolngu Boy and Johnson's direction of an episode of the children's TV drama Out There also earned AFI (the forerunner of AACTA) nominations.

== Selected filmography ==
As director

- The Genie from Down Under (1998 TV series, 2 episodes)
- Legacy of the Silver Shadow (2002 TV series, 3 episodes)
- Yolngu Boy (2001)
- Dead Gorgeous (2010 TV series, 9 episodes)
- High Ground (2020)

== Awards and nominations ==
=== ARIA Music Awards ===
The ARIA Music Awards is an annual awards ceremony that recognises excellence, innovation, and achievement across all genres of Australian music. They commenced in 1987.

Year	Nominee / work	Award	Result	Ref.
1992	Stephen Johnson for "Treaty (Filthy Lucre Remix)" by Yothu Yindi	Best Video	Nominated	
1993	Stephen Johnson for "Djäpana (Sunset Dreaming)" by Yothu Yindi	Best Video	Won	
