= World Turning (Yothu Yindi song) =

1993 single by Yothu Yindi

Single by Yothu Yindi

from the album Freedom
- B-side: "Gapu" (remix); "Wilawila"
- Released: 18 October 1993
- Genre: Indigenous Australian
- Length: 4:14
- Label: Mushroom
- Songwriter: Mandawuy Yunupingu
- Producer: Mark Moffatt

Yothu Yindi singles chronology
"Tribal Voice" (1992)	"World Turning" (1993)	"Timeless Land" (1994)

Music videos
- "World Turning" (original) on YouTube; "World Turning" (Räwak mix) on YouTube

"World Turning" is a song by Australian musical group Yothu Yindi, released in October 1993 as the lead single from their third album, Freedom. "World Turning" peaked at No. 56 on the Australian ARIA Singles Chart. In July 2025, Jessica Mauboy and Barkaa covered the song for Like a Version.

== Track listing ==
Australian CD single

1. "World Turning" (Räwak mix) – 3:52
2. "World Turning" (Another Pond mix) – 4:26
3. "Gapu" (Vibe mix) – 5:04
4. "Wilawila" – 0:46
5. "World Turning" (Djana mix) – 8:09

== Charts ==
Weekly chart performance for "World Turning"
Chart (1993)	Peak position
Australia (ARIA)	56
