= Sean Mununggurr =

Australian actor

- Occupation: Actor

Sean Mununggurr is an Australian actor. He has appeared in the films Yolngu Boy, Lucky Miles and High Ground. For his role in High Ground he was nominated for the 2021 AACTA Award for Best Actor in a Supporting Role.
