= Birrkuta – Wild Honey =

Studio album by Yothu Yindi
- Released: November 1996
- Recorded: 1995
- Genre: Aboriginal rock
- Length: 53:10
- Label: Yothu Yindi/Mushroom
- Producer: Lamar Lowder; Andrew Farriss

Yothu Yindi chronology
Freedom (1993)	Birrkuta – Wild Honey (1996)	One Blood (1998)

Singles from Birrkuta – Wild Honey
- 1. "Superhighway" Released: 1996

Birrkuta – Wild Honey is the fourth studio album by Australian band Yothu Yindi. It was released in November 1996 via Mushroom Records. It was co-produced by Lamar Lowder and Andrew Farriss.

Australian musicologist Ian McFarlane compared it to their previous album: "[it] continued Freedom's move towards a broader musical horizon while retaining a strong commercial appeal."

At the ARIA Music Awards of 1997, the album was nominated for Best Indigenous Release.

== Track listing ==
1. "Tears for Law" (Garrathiya Run) (Mandawuy Yunupingu, Daniel Watson)
2. "Yolngu Woman" (Mandawuy Yunupingu)
3. "Ngarrpiya" (Octopus) (Traditional song, arranged by Mandawuy Yunupingu, Gurrumul Yunupingu)
4. "Superhighway" (Mandawuy Yunupingu, Andrew Farriss)
5. "Bapane" (Traditional song, arranged by Galarrwuy Yunupingu, Gurrumul Yunupingu)
6. "Djatpa" (Mandawuy Yunupingu, Gurrumul Yunupingu)
7. "Timor" (Ben Hakalitz, Makuma Yunupingu, Mandawuy Yunupingu)
8. "Matter of Choice" (Mandawuy Yunupingu, Farriss)
9. "Stop That" (Stuart Kellaway)
10. "Lorrpu" (Traditional song, arranged by Galarrwuy Yunupingu, Gurrumul Yunupingu)
11. "Spirit of Peace" (Buruka Tau-Matagu, Hakalitz, William Takaku)
12. "Yirrmala" (Mandawuy Yunupingu, Kellaway, Gurrumul Yunupingu)
13. "Honey (Birrkuta)" (Mandawuy Yunupingu, Tau-Matagu, Galarrwuy Yunupingu)
14. "Cora" (Traditional song, arranged by Galarrwuy Yunupingu)
15. "Mice and Men" (Mandawuy Yunupingu)

== Personnel ==
- Mandawuy Yunupingu – lead vocals, vocals, guitar, acoustic guitar, clapsticks
- Gurrumul Yunupingu – electric guitar, lead vocals, vocals, backing vocals, bass guitar, clapsticks, acoustic guitar, didgeridoo, clavinet
- Makuma Yunupingu – lead vocals, vocals, backing vocals, didgeridoo, clapsticks
- Stuart Kellaway – guitar, bass guitar, acoustic guitar, slide guitar
- Milkayngu Mununggurr – didgeridoo
- Ben Hakalitz – drums, kundu, backing vocals, bass guitar, flutes
- Buruka Tau-Matagu – organ, electric piano, vocals, backing vocals, bass guitar, acoustic guitar, electric 12 string guitar, flutes
- Jodie Cockatoo Creed – vocals, backing vocals
- Airi Ingram – percussion
- Lamar Lowder – percussion
- Yomunu Yunupingu – didgeridoo
- Andrew Farriss – keyboards, guitar
- Galarrwuy Yunupingu – lead vocals, vocals, clapsticks

== Charts ==
Chart performance for Birrkuta – Wild Honey
Chart (1996)	Peak position
Australian Albums (ARIA)	92

== Release history ==
Release history and formats for Birrkuta – Wild Honey
Country	Date	Format	Label	Catalogue
Australia	November 1996	CD	Mushroom	D93461
