= Mark Ovenden (composer) =

Australian composer

Mark Ovenden is a composer and musician of Australian Aboriginal descent. In 2001 he won a Deadly for excellence In Film or Theatrical Score for his composing the score for Yolngu Boy.
