= High Ground (2020 film) =

2020 Australian Western film by Stephen Maxwell Johnson

- Theatrical release poster
- Directed by: Stephen Maxwell Johnson
- Screenplay by: Chris Anastassiades
- Story by: Chris Anastassiades; Stephen Maxwell Johnson; Witiyana Marika
- Produced by: David Jowsey; Maggie Miles; Witiyana Marika; Greer Simpkin; Stephen Maxwell Johnson
- Starring: Jacob Junior Nayinggul; Simon Baker; Callan Mulvey; Aaron Pedersen; Ryan Corr; Caren Pistorius; Sean Mununggurr; Witiyana Marika; Esmerelda Marimowa; Maximillian Johnson; Jack Thompson
- Cinematography: Andrew Commis
- Edited by: Jill Bilcock; Karryn De Cinque; Hayley Miro Browne
- Production companies: Maxo Studios, Bunya Productions, Savage Films
- Distributed by: Madman Films
- Release dates: 23 February 2020 (Berlin); 28 January 2021 (Australia)
- Running time: 104 minutes
- Country: Australia
- Language: English

High Ground is a 2020 Australian revisionist Western film directed by Stephen Maxwell Johnson, based on historical events that took place in Arnhem Land in the Northern Territory of Australia, set just after World War I. It has variously been called a Australian Western. However, it tells of a true historical event in a fictionalised manner, but with very close attention to and respect for Aboriginal culture.

The film premiered at the 70th Berlin International Film Festival on 23 February 2020, with the Australian premiere at the Brisbane International Film Festival later that year, and theatrical release in Australia on 28 January 2021.

== Plot ==
In 1919, a community of Yolngu people in Arnhem Land are massacred in a police operation to punish unrelated Aboriginal men for killing a cow. Only two survive the attack: a warrior, Baywara, and his nephew, Gutjuk. World War I veteran and policeman, Travis, saves and takes Gutjuk to the East Alligator River Mission Outpost, handing him over to Claire. Travis abandons his job in disgust.

Twelve years later, policemen Moran and Eddy reapproach the guilt-ridden Travis, insisting that he must hunt down a mob led by Baywara that has recently terrorised white settlements. Travis takes Gutjuk, now eighteen years old and called ‘Tommy’ in the mission, with him in an attempt to make peace with Baywara. Moran sends Eddy and Walter, a "half-caste", after them.

Once Baywara and his group are found, Grandfather Darrpa agrees to make peace negotiations with Moran back at the mission. The meeting is abruptly interrupted by news that Baywara has attacked another station. Gutjuk rescues Gulwirri, a young woman with Baywara's group, from getting assaulted by white stockmen.

Gutjuk and Gulwirri meet Baywara at the site of the 1919 massacre. Thinking that he is about to kill Gutjuk, Travis shoots Baywara. This triggers another series of killings, with Travis also shooting Walter to save Gutjuk. Now realising who was responsible for the murder of his family, Gutjuk shoots Travis, wounding but not killing him.

Gutjuk creates a distraction by burning the church and attacks the mission settlement. There is a stand-off; Travis shoots Moran, then Claire shoots Eddy. Moran's nephew, Bruce, aims at Gutjuk, but Travis takes the bullet and dies. Gutjuk and Gulwirri ride off on a piebald horse.

== Cast ==
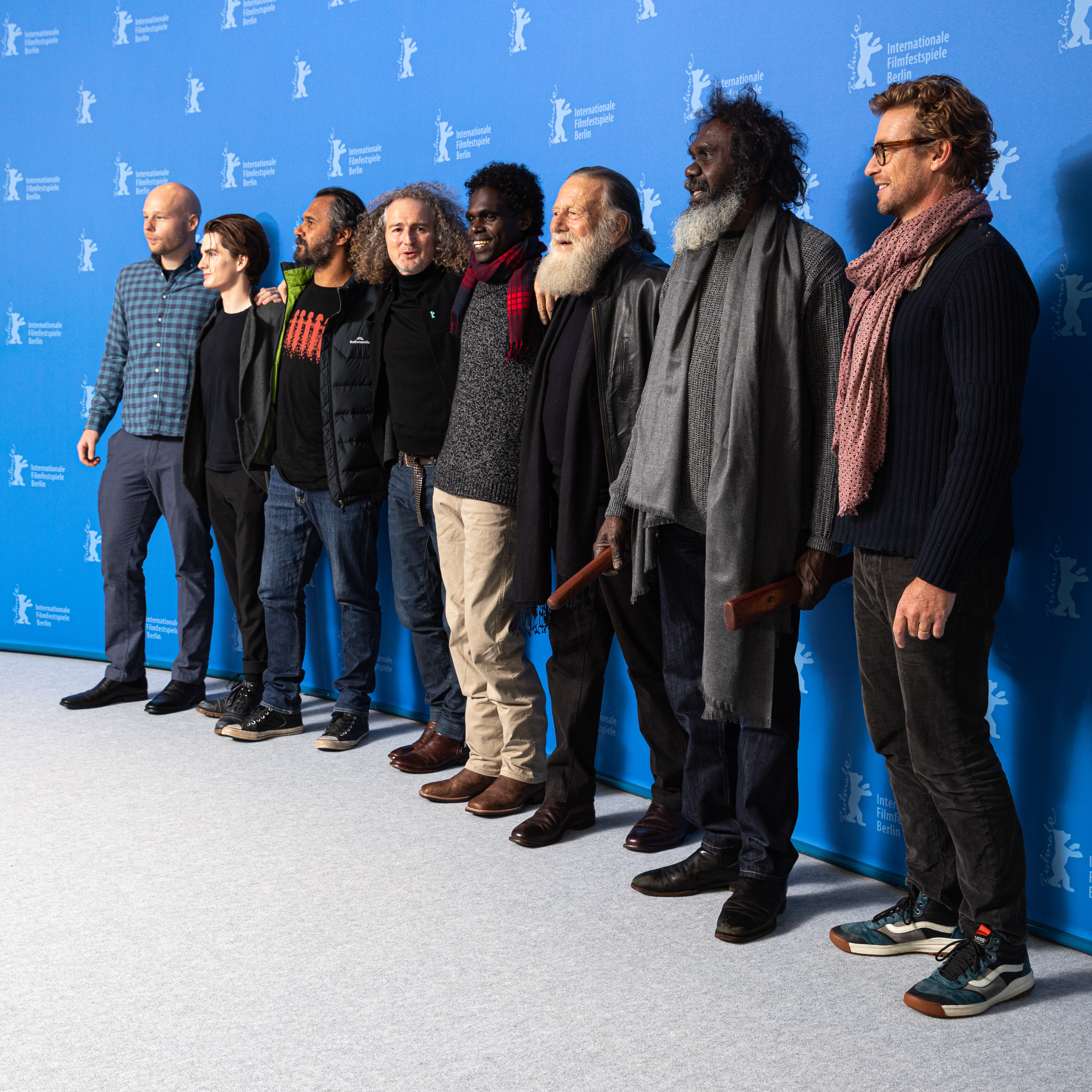
Cast and Crew at the Berlinale 2020

- Jacob Junior Nayinggul as Gutjuk
- Simon Baker as Travis
- Callan Mulvey as Eddy
- Jack Thompson as Moran
- Caren Pistorius as Claire
- Ryan Corr as Braddock
- Aaron Pedersen as Walter
- Sean Mununggurr as Baywara
- Witiyana Marika as Grandfather Darrpa
- Esmerelda Marimowa as Gulwirri
- Maximillian Johnson as Bruce
- David McMahon as Court
- John Brumpton as Donovan

== Themes ==
The film includes the depiction of a fictionalised version of a real historical massacre known as the Gan Gan massacre that occurred in 1911, when over 30 men, women and children were killed by police and settlers.

Although described as an Australian Western or revisionist Western in many sources, Johnson prefers the term "Northern", because it is a fictionalised retelling of a true story, and the film respectfully and meticulously documents Aboriginal culture, in close consultation with the Yolngu people, upon whose history it is based. Johnson said "We really feel it's a film that immerses the audience in a time and place and that perhaps hasn't happened in this way before", and producer Witiyana Marika called it a "northern action thriller". Johnson also said "There's a thriller aspect to it. It's not a Western, it's a Northern".

The story is based on a multitude of real-life past events, most of which are still in the living memory of people who were consulted in the making of the film. Johnson and his team strove to make it a balanced film – he uses the Yolngu language word makarrata (Note: See Makarrata Commission.) – in order to convey the story as a missed opportunity, where mistakes were made by both settler and Indigenous people, who were all flawed human beings. He describes it as a "deeply human story".

At the heart of High Ground is the tragic story of Frontier encounters and the missed opportunity between two cultures, black and white... Faced with the myth of terra nullius, the aim with the film is to create a new mythology and present a different perspective on how this country was made. It explores the themes of identity and culture and the attempts that were made to preserve and progress culture in the face of an overwhelming threat. High Ground is a story with mythic proportions with complexity and no easy answers... But above all it is a story about the finding of one's roots. My aim has been to entertain and immerse an audience in an environment teeming with unexpected threats, and to take them on a ride through an aspect of our history that is under-represented and hopefully encourage them to rethink the Australian story.

Similarly, Timothy Laurie writes in Australian Feminist Studies that High Ground is "a story about the constitutive violence that underpins the racialised gender order in Australia" and that the "inaugural violence in High Ground therefore persists as a public demand upon the viewer to reckon with the continuity of violence in the present."

== Production ==
The film was shot on location in the Kakadu National Park and in Arnhem Land, Northern Territory, Australia. Some was shot near Gunbalanya, which probably inspired the mission.

The film was a Maxo Studios, Bunya Productions, Savage Films production. It was financed by Screen Australia, Maxo Studios, Screen Territory, Film Victoria, private investment, Bunya Productions and Savage Films.

Director Stephen Johnson's friend Witiyana Marika served as co-creator and senior cultural adviser, and also played the part of Grandfather Dharrpa, while another good friend, Chris Anastassiades, who had also collaborated on Yolngu Boy, wrote the screenplay. Although the story was set in Bininj country in West Arnhem Land, while the 26 clans of Yolngu people live in East Arnhem Land, the film was cast from across Arnhem Land and includes people drawn from the many peoples of the land.

== Release ==
The film premiered at the 70th Berlin International Film Festival on 23 February 2020 with a gala screening, and was selected for the Berlinale Special section. The film was originally slated for release in Australia on 9 July 2020; this was later changed to early 2021, until a further announcement on 1 October 2020 revealed the Brisbane International Film Festival would host the Australian premiere. It was also shown in the Adelaide Film Festival from 17 October, with several extra sessions added to the original schedule.

The film was released theatrically in Australia on 28 January 2021 by Madman Films.

== Reception ==
On review aggregator Rotten Tomatoes, High Ground holds an approval rating of 89% based on 38 reviews, with an average rating of 7.2/10. The site's critical consensus reads, "A gripping action story as well as sobering commentary on colonialism, High Ground is a vividly engrossing attempt to grapple with Australian history."

The Film Critics Circle of Australia named High Ground the Best Australian Film of 2021, and it earned eight AACTA Award nominations.

=== Accolades ===
| Award | Ceremony date | Category | Subject | Result | Ref |
|---|---|---|---|---|---|
| AACTA Awards | 8 December 2021 | Best Film | David Jowsey | Nominated | |
| AACTA Awards | 8 December 2021 | Best Film | Witiyana Marika | Nominated | |
| AACTA Awards | 8 December 2021 | Best Film | Maggie Miles | Nominated | |
| AACTA Awards | 8 December 2021 | Best Film | Greer Simpkin | Nominated | |
| AACTA Awards | 8 December 2021 | Best Film | Stephen Maxwell Johnson | Nominated | |
| AACTA Awards | 8 December 2021 | Best Direction | Stephen Maxwell Johnson | Nominated | |
| AACTA Awards | 8 December 2021 | Best Original Screenplay | Chris Anastassiades | Nominated | |
| AACTA Awards | 8 December 2021 | Best Actor | Simon Baker | Nominated | |
| AACTA Awards | 8 December 2021 | Best Actor | Jacob Junior Nayinggul | Nominated | |
| AACTA Awards | 8 December 2021 | Best Supporting Actor | Sean Mununggurr | Nominated | |
| AACTA Awards | 8 December 2021 | Best Supporting Actor | Jack Thompson | Nominated | |
| AACTA Awards | 8 December 2021 | Best Supporting Actress | Esmerelda Marimowa | Nominated | |
| AACTA Awards | 8 December 2021 | Best Cinematography | Andrew Commis | Nominated | |
| AACTA Awards | 8 December 2021 | Best Editing | Jill Bilcock | Nominated | |
| AACTA Awards | 8 December 2021 | Best Editing | Karryn de Cinque | Nominated | |
| AACTA Awards | 8 December 2021 | Best Editing | Hayley Miro Browne | Nominated | |
| AACTA Awards | 8 December 2021 | Best Costume Design | Erin Roche | Won | |
