= Freedom (Yothu Yindi album) =

Studio album by Yothu Yindi
- Released: 8 November 1993
- Genre: Aboriginal rock
- Length: 53:05
- Label: Mushroom
- Producer: Ian Faith and Bill Laswell

Yothu Yindi chronology
Tribal Voice (1991)	Freedom (1993)	Birrkuta – Wild Honey (1996)

Singles from Freedom
- 1. "World Turning" Released: October 1993; 2. "Timeless Land" Released: February 1994; 3. "Dots on the Shells" Released: September 1994

Freedom is the third studio album by Australian band, Yothu Yindi released in 1993. The album peaked at number 31 on the ARIA charts.

At the ARIA Music Awards of 1994, the album was nominated for Best Indigenous Release.

Professional ratings
Review scores
Source	Rating
Q	3/5 stars
AllMusic	4/5 stars

== Track listing ==
1. "Timeless Land" (Mandawuy Yunupingu, Witiyana Marika, Stuart Kellaway, D. Bridie)
2. "World of Innocence" (M. Yunupingu, Kellaway, Ian Faith)
3. "Freedom" (M. Yunupingu)
4. "Baywara" (M. Yunupingu, Kellaway)
5. "Ngerrk" (Traditional song, arranged by Galarrwuy Yunupingu)
6. "Back to Culture" (M. Yunupingu, Kellaway, Ian Faith)
7. "World Turning" (M. Yunupingu, W. Marika, Ian Faith)
8. "Mabo" (M. Yunupingu, Galarrwuy Yunupingu, Kellaway, Gurrumul Yunupingu)
9. "Milika" (Traditional song, arranged by W. Marika)
10. "Danggultji" (Traditional song, arranged by W. Marika, B. Marika)
11. "Gunitjpirr Man" (M. Yunupingu)
12. "Yolngu Boy" (M. Yunupingu)
13. "Dots on the Shells" (M. Yunupingu, Neil Finn)
14. "Our Generation" (M. Yunupingu, Kellaway, A. Farris)
15. "Gany'tjurr" (Traditional song, arranged by Galarrwuy Yunupingu)
16. "Gapu" (Tidal Mix) (Traditional song, arranged by Galarrwuy Yunupingu)

== Personnel ==
- Mandawuy Yunupingu – vocals, guitar
- Witiyana Marika – vocals, clapsticks, dance
- Makuma Yunupingu – didgeridoo, vocals, clapsticks
- Stuart Kellaway – bass guitar
- Mangatjay Yunupingu – dance
- Banula Marika – vocals, dance
- Bunimbirr Marika – didgeridoo
- Cal Williams – guitar
- Natalie Gillespie – vocals
- Galarrwuy Yunupingu – vocals, clapsticks
- Milkayngu Mununggurr – didgeridoo
- Gurrumul Yunupingu – guitar, vocals, keyboards
- Jodie Cockatoo – vocals
- Ian Faith – guitars
- Mark Ovenden – keys, programming
- Bill Laswell – bass
- Nicky Skopelitis – 6 and 12-string guitar
- Bernie Worrell – organ
- Terepai Richmond – drums
- Daniel Watson – percussion
- Allen Murphy – drums
- Andrew Belletty – drums

== Charts ==
Chart performance for Freedom
Chart (1993–1994)	Peak position
Australian Albums (ARIA)	31

== Release history ==
Release history and formats for Freedom
Country	Date	Format	Label	Catalogue
Australia	November 1993	CD, cassette	Mushroom	D53380
