= Homeland Movement (album) =

Studio album by Yothu Yindi
- Released: April 1989
- Recorded: 1988
- Genre: Aboriginal rock
- Length: 38:51
- Label: Mushroom
- Producer: Leszek Karski

Yothu Yindi chronology
Homeland Movement (1989)	Tribal Voice (1991)

Singles from Homeland Movement
- 1. "Mainstream" Released: March 1989; 2. "Djäpana" Released: August 1989

Homeland Movement is the debut studio album by Australian rock band Yothu Yindi that was released in April 1989 on the Mushroom Records label. The album peaked at number 59 on the ARIA Chart in 1992.

== Background and release ==
Following a tour of Australia and North America in late 1988, supporting Midnight Oil, the band signed with Mushroom Records and spent a day in Sydney recording a demo tape. Mushroom Records released the demo as the band's debut album.

One side of the album comprised punchy politicised rock songs, such as "Mainstream", whilst the other side concentrated on traditionally based songs like "Djapana (Sunset Dreaming)", written by former teacher Mandawuy Yunupingu.

== Track listing ==
1. "Mainstream" (Yunupingu)
2. "Yolngu Woman" (Yunupingu)
3. "Homeland Movement" (Yunupingu)
4. "Yolngu Boy" (Yunupingu)
5. "Djäpana" (Yunupingu)
6. "Gamadala" (Traditional song, arranged by Witiyana Marika, Milkayngu Mununggurr, Yunupingu)
7. "Garrtjambal" (Traditional song, arranged by Marika, Mununggurr, Yunupingu)
8. "Mambulmambul" (Traditional song, arranged by Marika, Mununggurr, Yunupingu)
9. "Gudurrku" (Traditional song, arranged by Marika, Mununggurr, Yunupingu)
10. "Barrwula" (Traditional song, arranged by Marika, Mununggurr, Yunupingu)
11. "Gunmarra" (Traditional song, arranged by Marika, Mununggurr, Yunupingu)
12. "Luku-Wangawuy Manikay" (1788) (Djenarra Galarrwuy)

== Personnel ==
- Mandawuy Yunupingu – vocals, guitar, clapsticks
- Witiyana Marika – vocals, clapsticks
- Milkayngu Mununggurr – didgeridoo
- Cal Williams – guitar
- Stuart Kellaway – bass guitar
- Andrew Belletty – drums
- Bart Willoughby – drums

== Charts ==
Chart performance for Homeland Movement
Chart (1989–1992)	Peak position
Australian Albums (ARIA)	59

== Release history ==
Release history and formats for Homeland Movement
Country	Date	Format	Label	Catalogue
Australia	April 1989	LP, CD, cassette	Mushroom	D38959
