= Tribal Voice =

Studio album by Yothu Yindi
- Released: September 17, 1991
- Recorded: 1989–1990
- Studios: The Vault, Paradise, RBX Studios
- Genre: Aboriginal rock
- Length: 42:57
- Label: Mushroom Records
- Producer: Mark Moffatt

Yothu Yindi chronology
Homeland Movement (1989)	Tribal Voice (1991)	Freedom (1993)

Singles from Tribal Voice
- 1. "Treaty" Released: 18 February 1991; 2. "Djäpana (Sunset Dreaming)" Released: April 1992; 3. "Tribal Voice" Released: September 1992

Tribal Voice is the second studio album by Yothu Yindi, released in September 1991 on the Mushroom Records label. The album peaked at number 4 on the ARIA Charts and was certified 2× Platinum.

At the 1992 ARIA Awards Yothu Yindi won Best Cover Art for Tribal Voice by Louise Beach and Mushroom Art with photography by Serge Thomann; Engineer of the Year for "Maralitja", "Dharpa" and "Tribal Voice" by David Price, Ted Howard, Greg Henderson and Simon Polinski; Best Indigenous Release for Tribal Voice; Song of the Year and Single for the Year for "Treaty".

The album did not receive a domestic vinyl release until 2018, however it was released on vinyl in Europe in 1992.

== Reception ==
Professional ratings
Review scores
Source	Rating
AllMusic	link

AllMusic's reviewer, Jonathon Lewis commented "the traditional songs are stunning, and Mandawuy Yunupingu's voice is suited perfectly to these, but it is the rock tracks that are the weak links in this disc. Yunupingu is not a particularly good pop singer, and the music is sometimes insipid" but went on to say "despite this, Tribal Voice is a fine example of both traditional and modern Aboriginal music."

== Track listing ==
1. "Gapu" (Traditional song, arranged by Galarrwuy Yunupingu)
2. "Treaty" (Mandawuy Yunupingu, Geoffrey Gurrumul Yunupingu, Milkayngu Mununggurr, Witiyana Marika, Stuart Kellaway, Cal Williams, Paul Kelly)
3. "Djäpana (Sunset Dreaming)" (M. Yunupingu)
4. "My Kind of Life" (M. Yunupingu)
5. "Maralitja" (Crocodile Man) (M. Yunupingu)
6. "Dhum Dhum" (Bush Wallaby) (Traditional song, arranged by Marika)
7. "Tribal Voice" (M. Yunupingu)
8. "Mainstream" (M. Yunupingu)
9. "Dharpa" (Tree) (M. Yunupingu, Kellaway)
10. "Yinydjapana" (Dolphin) (Traditional song, arranged by Marika)
11. "Mätjala" (Driftwood) (M. Yunupingu, G. Yunupingu, Marika, Kellaway, Williams)
12. "Hope" (M. Yunupingu)
13. "Gapirri" (Stingray) (M. Yunupingu)
14. "Beyarrmak" (Comic) (Traditional song, arranged by G. Yunupingu)
15. "Treaty" (Radio Mix) (M. Yunupingu, G. Yunupingu, Mununggurr, Marika, Kellaway, Williams, Kelly, Garrett) (moved to after "Tribal Voice" on 2018 LP reissue)
16. "Djäpana" (Radio Mix) (M. Yunupingu)

Tracks 3, 8 and 16 were added to the 1992 reissue of the album and appear on all subsequent reissues. Tracks 3, 6 and 16 were released as a CD single in 1992 and tracks 3 and 8 appear (in different versions) on the band's 1989 debut Homeland Movement.

Track 15 appears in the 1992 film Encino Man.

Track 16 appears in the 1993 film Reckless Kelly.

== Personnel ==
- Mandawuy Yunupingu – lead vocals, backing vocals, guitar
- Galarrwuy Yunupingu – vocals, clapsticks
- Witiyana Marika – vocals, clapsticks, backing vocals
- Milkayngu Mununggurr – didgeridoo, backing vocals
- Gurrumul Yunupingu – keyboards, percussion, guitar, didgeridoo, organ, backing vocals
- Makuma Yunupingu – didgeridoo
- Cal Williams – lead guitar, rhythm guitar, guitar, backing vocals
- Stuart Kellaway – bass guitar, backing vocals
- Ricki Fataar – drums, percussion, backing vocals
- Mark Moffatt – organ, bass guitar, guitar
- Ray Periera – congas
- Allen Murphy – drums
- Huey Benjamin – drums
- Archie Roach – backing vocals
- Tim Finn – backing vocals
- Rose Bygrave – backing vocals
- Steve Wade – backing vocals

== Charts ==
=== Weekly charts ===
Weekly chart performance for Tribal Voice
Chart (1991–1993)	Peak position
Australian Albums (ARIA)	4

=== Year-end charts ===
Year-end chart performance for Tribal Voice
Chart (1992)	Position
Australian Albums (ARIA)	15

== Certifications ==
Certifications for Tribal Voice
Region	Certification	Certified units/sales
Australia (ARIA)	2× Platinum	140,000^{^}
^{^} Shipments figures based on certification alone.
