= Treaty (song) =

Single by Yothu Yindi

from the album Tribal Voice
- Language: Gumatj, English
- B-side: "Yolngu Boy"
- Released: 18 February 1991
- Genre: Pop; new wave; Indigenous Australian
- Length: 3:35
- Label: Mushroom; Razor
- Songwriters: Paul Kelly; Mandawuy Yunupingu; Stuart Kellaway; Cal Williams; Gurrumul Yunupingu; Milkayngu Mununggurr; Banula Marika; Peter Garrett
- Producer: Mark Moffatt

Yothu Yindi singles chronology
"Djäpana (Sunset Dreaming)" (1989)	"Treaty" (1991)	"Treaty" (remix) (1991)
"Treaty" (1991)	"Treaty" (remix) (1991)	"Djäpana (Sunset Dreaming)" (remix) (1992)

Music videos
- "Treaty" on YouTube; "Treaty" (remix) on YouTube

"Treaty" is a protest song by Australian musical group Yothu Yindi, which is made up of Aboriginal and balanda (non-Aboriginal) members. Released in February 1991, "Treaty" did not chart until a remix was released in May 1991, when it became the first song by a predominantly Aboriginal band to chart in Australia and was the first song partly in any Aboriginal Australian language to gain extensive international recognition, peaking at No. 6 on the Billboard Dance Club Play singles charts. The song contains lyrics in Gumatj, one of the Yolngu Matha dialects and a language of the Yolngu people of Arnhem Land in northern Australia.

The song was released three years after the presentation of the Barunga Statement to then-Prime Minister Bob Hawke. Brothers Mandawauy and Galarrwuy Yunupingu wanted to highlight the lack of progress on the treaty between Indigenous Australians and the Australian government.

"Treaty" peaked at No. 11 on the ARIA Singles Chart in September 1991. In May 2001 "Treaty" was selected by the Australasian Performing Right Association (APRA) as one of the Top 30 Australian songs of all time. In 2009 "Treaty" was added to the National Film and Sound Archive's Sounds of Australia registry. In January 2018, as part of Triple M's "Ozzest 100", the "most Australian songs of all time", the Filthy Lucre version of "Treaty" was ranked number 10.

== Background ==
In 1988, as part of Bicentennial celebrations, the Prime Minister of Australia, Bob Hawke, visited the Northern Territory for the Barunga Festival, where he was presented with a statement of Aboriginal political objectives by Galarrwuy Yunupingu and Wenten Rubuntja, known as the Barunga Statement. Hawke responded to the Barunga Statement with a promise that a treaty would be concluded with Indigenous Australians by 1990.

In 1991, Yothu Yindi were Hughie Benjamin on drums, Sophie Garrkali and Julie Gungunbuy as dancers, Stuart Kellaway on bass guitar, Witiyana Marika on manikay (traditional vocals), bilma (ironwood clapsticks) and dance, Milkayngu Mununggurr on yidaki (didgeridoo), Gurrumul Yunupingu on keyboards, guitar and percussion, Makuma Yunupingu on yidaki, vocals, bilma, Mandawuy Yunupingu on vocals and guitar, Mangatjay Yunupingu as a dancer. Mandawuy Yunupingu, with his older brother Galarrwuy, wanted a song to highlight the lack of progress on the treaty between Aboriginal peoples and the federal government. Mandawuy Yunupingu recalls:

Bob Hawke visited the Territory. He went to this gathering in Barunga. And this is where he made a statement that there shall be a treaty between black and white Australia. Sitting around the camp fire, trying to work out a chord to the guitar, and around that camp fire, I said, "Well, I heard it on the radio. And I saw it on the television." That should be a catchphrase. And that's where 'Treaty' was born.

— Mandawuy Yunupingu, 8 July 2004

== Production and release ==
"Treaty" was written by Australian musician Paul Kelly and Yothu Yindi members Mandawuy Yunupingu, Kellaway, Williams, Gurrumul Yunupingu, Mununggurr and Marika and Peter Garrett. "Treaty" was released as a 7-inch single and a cassette single on 18 February 1991. The initial release received limited radio and television exposure (mainly on ABC radio and SBS television). On 27 May 1991, the song was re-released in a remixed form on a 12-inch single; the following week, on 3 June, the remix was released on cassette.

== Reception ==
After the initial release of the song failed to chart, Melbourne-based DJ Gavin Campbell (Razor Records), approached Mushroom Records to create a dance-oriented remix. The Filthy Lucre production team, consisting of Campbell, Paul Main and Robert Goodge produced a remix without the band's involvement but with the understanding that the Yolngu side of the music would be preserved. The remix not only modified the musical backing but dispensed with the majority of the English language lyrics, with the song sung almost entirely in the Aboriginal language, Gumatj. The Filthy Lucre remix entered the charts in July and peaked at No. 11 on the Australian Recording Industry Association (ARIA) singles charts by September, spending a total of 22 weeks in the national charts.

"Treaty" was the first song by a predominantly Aboriginal band to chart in Australia.

Success for the single was transferred to the related album Tribal Voice which peaked at No. 4 on the ARIA Albums Chart. The album produced by Mark Moffatt for Mushroom Records was released in September 1991. Mandawuy Yunupingu took leave of absence from his duties as principal to tour and promote the single and album.

"Treaty" peaked at No. 11 on the ARIA Singles Chart in September 1991.

In May 2001 "Treaty" was selected by the Australasian Performing Right Association (APRA) as one of the Top 30 Australian songs of all time.

In 2009 "Treaty" was added to the National Film and Sound Archive's Sounds of Australia registry.

In January 2018, as part of Triple M's "Ozzest 100", the "most Australian songs of all time", the Filthy Lucre version of "Treaty" was ranked number 10.

In 2025 the song placed 36 in the Triple J Hottest 100 of Australian Songs.

== Use in the 2023 "Voice" protest on Triple J ==
In October 2023, Australia's Triple J radio station played "Treaty" on repeat for one hour in protest over the fact that the "No" vote won in the 2023 Australian Indigenous Voice referendum.

"Treaty" was played for the entire block of rapper Nooky’s all-Indigenous music show Blak Out between 5pm and 6pm.

Nooky said at the start of the show, "October 14 was a moment in history where a dark cloud will forever cast a shadow."

A proud Yuin and Thunghutti man, Nooky continued: "I feel like I let down my elders, I feel like I let down the future generations. Last night was the most overt, unconcealed manifestation of racism I’ve ever experienced in my whole life."

"Yesterday they said our pain and our suffering continues. The disadvantage and the inequality continues. But so does our love, our happiness, our strength and our pride."

== Awards ==
At the APRA Music Awards of 1991, "Treaty" won song of the Year.

At the 1992 ARIA Awards Yothu Yindi won awards for 'Engineer of the Year' for "Maralitja" (maralitja is Yolngu matha for crocodile man – one of Mandawuy Yunupingu's tribal names), "Dharpa" (dharpa is tree), "Treaty", "Treaty (Filthy Lucre remix)" and "Tribal Voice" by David Price, Ted Howard, Greg Henderson and Simon Polinski; 'Song of the Year' for "Treaty"; and "Single of the Year" for "Treaty".

In May 2001 "Treaty" was selected by Australasian Performing Right Association (APRA) as one of the Top 30 Australian songs of all time.

== Musical style ==
Musically the song is a mixture of Yolngu and balanda styles. The timbres of the song include the balanda rock ensemble of electric guitars, keyboard and drumkit, and on occasion balanda voices. The Yolngu sounds include the lead singer's vocal quality, and the traditional instruments, bilma (ironwood clapsticks) and yidaki. The song's text is partly in English and partly in Gamatj, and the form of the song, while conforming to the balanda rock structure of verses and choruses with an instrumental break, and the process of intensity through repetition of short motifs, is nevertherless that of a djatpangarri, a form of Yolngu popular music.

Mandawuy Yunupingu recalled hearing the djantpangarri / djedbangari song "Storm", which originates from Yirrkala in the Northern Territory. He incorporated the beat into the musical composition.

== Music videos ==
There were two video clips for "Treaty". The first features footage of the 1988 Barunga Festival where the Barunga Statement is shown in its final stages of preparation, and Prime Minister Hawke is shown participating didjeridu-playing and spear-throwing competitions. As the Barunga Statement is presented to the Prime Minister, he is accompanied by the Minister for Indigenous Affairs, Gerry Hand. Also included in this first clip are images of the band in concert, and footage from the Gove Peninsula of industrial bauxite mining, ceremonial dancing led by Witiyana in the bush and children dancing on the beach. According to the director, Stephen Johnson, it was never his intention to make a consciously "political" video.

A second clip for "Treaty" was made to accompany the Filthy Lucre remix. It was also directed by Stephen Johnson and dispenses with the overtly political shots of the previous video. The video features images of the band in concert as well as footage from the Gove Peninsula of ceremonial dancing led by Witiyana in the bush, Witiyana and Milkayngu dancing with their instruments on the beach, Mandawuy Yunupingu singing over a blazing fire and children dancing on the beach with portable stereo given to them by Mandawuy Yunupingu.

We wanted to portray Yolngu people having a good time... we had the political stuff in the first clip... it is political enough in the sense that it is showing a positive, healthy and strong side of Aboriginal culture – that's the best message of all... I wanted people to dance, pick up on the movements and Yolngu style of dancing.

— Stephen Johnson

== Track listing ==
=== Yothu Yindi original version ===
1. "Treaty" (Paul Kelly, Mandawuy Yunupingu, Stuart Kellaway, Cal Williams, Geoffrey Gurrumul Yunupingu, Milkayngu Mununggurr and Witiyana Marika) – 3:35
2. "Yolngu Boy" (Mandawuy Yunupingu) – 4:14

=== Filthy Lucre remix version ===
Australian 12"/CD/Cassette

1. "Treaty" (Filthy Lucre Remix) – 6:52
2. "Treaty" (Radio Mix) – 4:08
3. "Treaty" (Dub) – 7:30

US CD single

1. "Treaty" (Filthy Lucre Radio Edit) – 4:05
2. "Treaty" (Filthy Lucre Remix) – 6:53
3. "Treaty" (Djulpan/Seven Sisters Mix) – 5:50 (William Orbit remix)
4. "Treaty" (Album Version) – 3:36

US 12"

1. "Treaty" (Djulpan/Seven Sisters Mix) – 5:46
2. "Treaty" (VCO Buzz Mix) – 5:25
3. "Treaty" (A Cappella) – 0:25
4. "Treaty" (Filthy Lucre Mix) – 6:55
5. "Treaty" (Filthy Lucre Dub) – 7:27

== Personnel ==
Production details

- Engineer – David Price, Ted Howard, Greg Henderson, Simon Polinski
- Producer – Mark Moffatt
- Remixers – Robert Goodge, Gavin Campbell, Paul Main (Filthy Lucre version)

== Charts ==
=== Weekly charts ===
Weekly chart performance for "Treaty"
Chart (1991–1992)	Peak position
Australia (ARIA)	11
Belgium (Ultratop 50 Flanders)	9
Netherlands (Single Top 100)	29
Switzerland (Schweizer Hitparade)	33
UK Singles (Official Charts)	72
UK Indie (Official Charts)	24
US Dance Club Songs (Billboard)	6

=== Year-end charts ===
Year-end chart performance for "Treaty"
Chart (1991)	Position
Australia (ARIA)	29

== Certifications ==
Certifications for "Treaty"
Region	Certification	Certified units/sales
Australia (ARIA)	Gold	35,000^{^}
^{^} Shipments figures based on certification alone.
