= Djäpana =

1989 single by Yothu Yindi

"Djäpana (Sunset Dreaming)"
- Original artwork

Single by Yothu Yindi

from the album Homeland Movement & Tribal Voice
- Released: October 1989
- Length: 3:35
- Label: Mushroom
- Songwriter: M. Yunupingu
- Producer: Mark Moffatt

Yothu Yindi singles chronology
"Mainstream" (1989)	"Djäpana (Sunset Dreaming)" (1989)	"Treaty" (1991)
"Treaty" (remix) (1991)	"Djäpana (Sunset Dreaming)" (remix) (1992)	"Tribal Voice" (1992)

Music videos
- "Djäpana (Sunset Dreaming)" on YouTube; "Djäpana (Sunset Dreaming)" (remix) on YouTube

"Djäpana", subtitled "Sunset Dreaming", is a 1989 song by Australian musical group Yothu Yindi.

== History ==
The song was first released in August 1989 as the second and final single from the group's debut album, Homeland Movement.

The song was re-recorded and re-released in April 1992, following the success of "Treaty" in 1991. The re-release saw the song peak at number 13 on the ARIA Singles Chart and was certified gold.

== Awards ==
At the ARIA Music Awards of 1993 the song won three awards; Best Indigenous Release, Best Video (Stephen Johnson) and Engineer of the Year (Greg Henderson).

== Track listings ==
7-inch single

1. "Djapana (Sunset Dreaming)"
2. "Gunumarra – Seq 1"
3. "Gunumarra – Seq 2"

CD and 12-inch single

1. "Djäpana (Sunset Dreaming)" (Gapirri Mix) – 3:59
2. "Dhum Dhum (Bush Wallaby)"
3. "Djäpana (Sunset Dreaming)" – 3:43

UK CD single

1. "Djäpana (Sunset Dreaming)" (Gapirri Mix) – 3:59
2. "Treaty (Filthy Lucre Remix)" – 6:51
3. "Dhum Dhum" (Bush Wallaby) – 1:05
4. "Matjala" (Driftwood) – 5:23

US 12-inch single

1. "Djäpana" (Gapirri Mix) – 7:46
2. "Djäpana" (A Capella Mix) – 3:37
3. "Djäpana" (Babylon Mix) – 6:05
4. "Djäpana" (Discoridub Mix) – 4:30
5. "Djäpana" (Chic Clip Dub) – 3:54

== Charts ==
=== Weekly charts ===
Chart (1992)	Peak position
Australia (ARIA)	13

=== Year-end charts ===
Chart (1992)	Position
Australia (ARIA)	58

== Certifications ==
Region	Certification	Certified units/sales
Australia (ARIA)	Gold	35,000^{^}
^{^} Shipments figures based on certification alone.

== Release history ==
Country	Date	Format	Version	Label
Australia	August 1989	7-inch vinyl	Original	Mushroom
Australia	April 1992	CD, cassette, 12-inch vinyl	re-release	Mushroom
United States	1992	12-inch vinyl	re-release	Hollywood
