= ARIA Award for Best Male Artist =

Former Australian music award

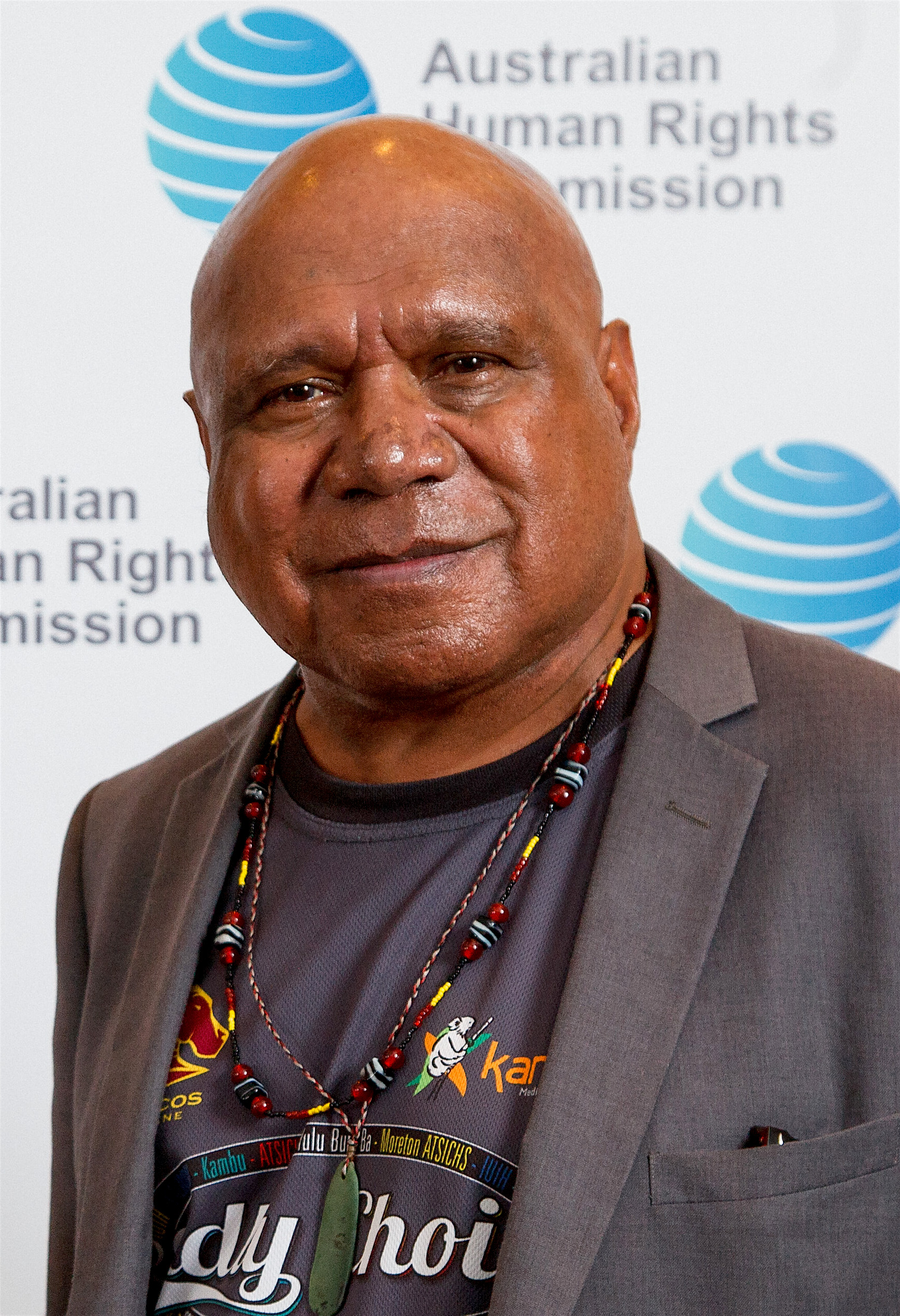
- 2020 winner Archie Roach
- Country: Australia
- Presented by: Australian Recording Industry Association (ARIA)
- First award: 1987
- Final award: 2020
- Currently held by: Archie Roach, Tell Me Why (2020)

Highlights
- Most wins: Diesel, John Farnham, Alex Lloyd, Gotye and Paul Kelly (3 each)
- Most nominations: Paul Kelly (18)
- Website: ariaawards.com.au

The ARIA Music Award for Best Male Artist, is an award presented at the annual ARIA Music Awards, which recognises "the many achievements of Aussie artists across all music genres", since 1987. It is handed out by the Australian Recording Industry Association (ARIA), an organisation whose aim is "to advance the interests of the Australian record industry." The award is given to an Australian male artist who has had a single or an album appear in the ARIA Top 100 Singles Chart between the eligibility period, and is voted for by a judging academy, which comprises 1000 members from different areas of the music industry.

The award for Best Male Artist was first presented to John Farnham in 1987. Farnham, Diesel, Alex Lloyd, Gotye and Paul Kelly hold the record for the most wins, with three each, followed by Jimmy Barnes, Flume and Nick Cave with two; Gotye and Flume won all their nominations. Four of those artists won in consecutive years; Farnham in 1987 and 1988, Diesel from 1993 to 1995, becoming the only artist with three consecutive wins, Kelly in 1997 and 1998, Lloyd in 2002 and 2003 and Gotye in 2011 and 2012. Kelly holds the record for most nominations at 18, while Guy Sebastian received the most nominations without a win with seven.

This and the ARIA Award for Best Female Artist was merged in 2021 to form a single award for Best Artist. The change was designed to ensure that the ARIA Awards reflect and embrace equality and the true diversity of the music industry in 2021. The number of nominees for Best Artist was increased to ten.

== Winners and nominees ==
In the following table, the winner is highlighted in a separate colour, and in boldface; the nominees are those that are not highlighted or in boldface.

Winner marked in a separate colour

Year	Winner(s)	Album/Single Title
**1987** (1st)	**John Farnham**	**Whispering Jack**
**1987** (1st)	Jimmy Barnes	"Good Times"
**1987** (1st)	Martin Plaza	Plaza Suite
**1987** (1st)	Paul Kelly	Gossip
**1987** (1st)	Tim Finn	Big Canoe
**1988** (2nd)	**John Farnham**	—N/a
**1989** (3rd)
**1989** (3rd)	**Jimmy Barnes**	**Barnestorming**
**1989** (3rd)	Stephen Cummings	A Life Is a Life
**1989** (3rd)	John Farnham	Age of Reason
**1989** (3rd)	Paul Kelly	"Forty Miles to Saturday Night"
**1989** (3rd)	James Reyne	"Motor's Too Fast"
**1990** (4th)
**1990** (4th)	**Ian Moss**	**Matchbook**
**1990** (4th)	Peter Blakeley	"Crying in the Chapel"
**1990** (4th)	Joe Camilleri	"Angel Dove"
**1990** (4th)	Stephen Cummings	A New Kind of Blue
**1990** (4th)	Paul Kelly	So Much Water So Close To Home
**1991** (5th)
**1991** (5th)	**John Farnham**	**Chain Reaction**
**1991** (5th)	Peter Blakeley	Harry's Café De Wheels
**1991** (5th)	Jimmy Barnes	Two Fires
**1991** (5th)	Daryl Braithwaite	Rise
**1991** (5th)	Stephen Cummings	"Hell (You've Put Me Through)"
**1992** (6th)
**1992** (6th)	**Jimmy Barnes**	**Soul Deep**
**1992** (6th)	Daryl Braithwaite	"The Horses"
**1992** (6th)	John Farnham	Full House
**1992** (6th)	Richard Pleasance	Galleon
**1992** (6th)	Tommy Emmanuel	Determination
**1993** (7th)
**1993** (7th)	**Diesel**	**Hepfidelity**
**1993** (7th)	Chris Wilson	Landlocked
**1993** (7th)	Jimmy Barnes	"Ain't No Mountain High Enough"
**1993** (7th)	Jon Stevens	"Superstar"
**1993** (7th)	Paul Kelly	Paul Kelly Live
**1994** (8th)
**1994** (8th)	**Diesel**	**The Lobbyist**
**1994** (8th)	Jimmy Barnes	Flesh and Wood
**1994** (8th)	John Farnham	Then Again
**1994** (8th)	Tex Perkins	Sad but True
**1994** (8th)	Tim Finn	Before & After
**1995** (9th)
**1995** (9th)	**Diesel**	**Solid State Rhyme**
**1995** (9th)	Chris Wilson	Live at the Continental
**1995** (9th)	Ed Kuepper	Character Assassination
**1995** (9th)	Paul Kelly	Wanted Man
**1995** (9th)	Rick Price	"River of Love"
**1996** (10th)
**1996** (10th)	**Dave Graney**	**The Soft 'n' Sexy Sound**
**1996** (10th)	Diesel	Short Cool Ones
**1996** (10th)	John Farnham	Romeo's Heart
**1996** (10th)	Paul Kelly	Deeper Water
**1996** (10th)	Tex Perkins	"You're Too Beautiful"
**1997** (11th)
**1997** (11th)	**Paul Kelly**	**How to Make Gravy**
**1997** (11th)	Dave Graney	The Devil Drives
**1997** (11th)	Jimmy Barnes	"Lover Lover"
**1997** (11th)	Mark Seymour	"Last Ditch Cabaret"
**1997** (11th)	Tex Perkins	Far Be It From Me
**1998** (12th)
**1998** (12th)	**Paul Kelly**	**Words and Music**
**1998** (12th)	Chris Wilson	The Long Weekend
**1998** (12th)	Ed Kuepper	Live!
**1998** (12th)	Mark Seymour	King Without a Clue
**1998** (12th)	Matt Walker	I Listen to the Night
**1999** (13th)
**1999** (13th)	**Tim Rogers**	**What Rhymes with Cars and Girls**
**1999** (13th)	Alex Lloyd	"Lucky Star"
**1999** (13th)	Ben Lee	Breathing Tornados
**1999** (13th)	Josh Abrahams	Sweet Distorted Holiday
**1999** (13th)	Paul Kelly	"I'll Be Your Lover"
**2000** (14th)
**2000** (14th)	**Alex Lloyd**	**Black the Sun**
**2000** (14th)	David Bridie	Act of Free Choice
**2000** (14th)	Endorphin	Skin
**2000** (14th)	Groove Terminator	Road Kill
**2000** (14th)	Paul Kelly	Smoke
**2001** (15th)
**2001** (15th)	**Nick Cave**	**No More Shall We Part**
**2001** (15th)	John Butler	Three
**2001** (15th)	Paul Kelly	Roll on Summer EP
**2001** (15th)	Paul Mac	"Just the Thing"
**2001** (15th)	Tex Perkins	Dark Horses
**2002** (16th)
**2002** (16th)	**Alex Lloyd**	**Watching Angels Mend**
**2002** (16th)	Dan Brodie	Empty Arms, Broken Hearts
**2002** (16th)	Darren Hayes	Spin
**2002** (16th)	Paul Kelly	...Nothing but a Dream
**2002** (16th)	Paul Mac	3000 Feet High
**2003** (17th)
**2003** (17th)	**Alex Lloyd**	**"Coming Home"**
**2003** (17th)	Ben Lee	Hey You. Yes You.
**2003** (17th)	John Butler	Living 2001–2002
**2003** (17th)	Nick Cave	Nocturama
**2003** (17th)	Tex Perkins	Sweet Nothing
**2004** (18th)
**2004** (18th)	**John Butler**	**Sunrise Over Sea**
**2004** (18th)	Alex Lloyd	Distant Light
**2004** (18th)	Dan Kelly	Sing the Tabloid Blues
**2004** (18th)	Pete Murray	"So Beautiful"
**2004** (18th)	Tim Rogers	Spit Polish
**2005** (19th)
**2005** (19th)	**Ben Lee**	**Awake Is the New Sleep**
**2005** (19th)	John Butler	"Something's Gotta Give"
**2005** (19th)	Keith Urban	Be Here
**2005** (19th)	Lior	Autumn Flow
**2005** (19th)	Paul Kelly	Foggy Highway
**2006** (20th)
**2006** (20th)	**Bernard Fanning**	**Tea & Sympathy**
**2006** (20th)	Ben Lee	"We're All in This Together"
**2006** (20th)	Bob Evans	Suburban Songbook
**2006** (20th)	Dan Kelly	Pirate Radio
**2006** (20th)	Pete Murray	See the Sun
**2007** (21st)
**2007** (21st)	**Gotye**	**Mixed Blood**
**2007** (21st)	Dan Kelly	Drowning in the Fountain of Youth
**2007** (21st)	John Butler	Grand National
**2007** (21st)	Josh Pyke	Memories & Dust
**2007** (21st)	Paul Kelly	Stolen Apples
**2008** (22nd)
**2008** (22nd)	**Nick Cave**	**Dig, Lazarus, Dig!!!**
**2008** (22nd)	Geoffrey Gurrumul Yunupingu	Gurrumul
**2008** (22nd)	Paul Kelly	"To Her Door" (Live)
**2008** (22nd)	Pete Murray	Summer at Eureka
**2008** (22nd)	Sam Sparro	Sam Sparro
**2009** (23rd)
**2009** (23rd)	**Daniel Merriweather**	**Love & War**
**2009** (23rd)	Bob Evans	Goodnight, Bull Creek!
**2009** (23rd)	C.W. Stoneking	Jungle Blues
**2009** (23rd)	Josh Pyke	Chimney's Afire
**2009** (23rd)	Paul Dempsey	Everything Is True
**2010** (24th)
**2010** (24th)	**Dan Sultan**	**Get Out While You Can**
**2010** (24th)	Dan Kelly	Dan Kelly's Dream
**2010** (24th)	Guy Sebastian	Like It Like That
**2010** (24th)	John Butler	April Uprising
**2010** (24th)	Paul Dempsey	"Fast Friends"
**2011** (25th)
**2011** (25th)	**Gotye**	**"Somebody That I Used to Know"**
**2011** (25th)	Drapht	The Life of Riley
**2011** (25th)	Gareth Liddiard	Strange Tourist
**2011** (25th)	Geoffrey Gurrumul Yunupingu	Rrakala
**2011** (25th)	Josh Pyke	"No One Wants a Lover"
**2012** (26th)
**2012** (26th)	**Gotye**	**Making Mirrors**
**2012** (26th)	360	Falling & Flying
**2012** (26th)	Angus Stone	Broken Brights
**2012** (26th)	Guy Sebastian	"Battle Scars"
**2012** (26th)	Keith Urban	"For You"
**2012** (26th)	Matt Corby	Into the Flame
**2013** (27th)
**2013** (27th)	**Flume**	**Flume**
**2013** (27th)	Guy Sebastian	Armageddon
**2013** (27th)	Keith Urban	"Little Bit of Everything"
**2013** (27th)	Matt Corby	"Resolution"
**2013** (27th)	Paul Kelly	Spring and Fall
**2014** (28th)
**2014** (28th)	**Chet Faker**	**Built on Glass**
**2014** (28th)	Dan Sultan	Blackbird
**2014** (28th)	Geoffrey Gurrumul Yunupingu	Gurrumul & The Sydney Symphony Orchestra – His Life and Music
**2014** (28th)	Guy Sebastian	"Come Home with Me"
**2014** (28th)	Vance Joy	"Mess Is Mine"
**2015** (29th)
**2015** (29th)	**Vance Joy**	**Dream Your Life Away**
**2015** (29th)	#1 Dads	"Nominal"
**2015** (29th)	Daniel Johns	Talk
**2015** (29th)	Guy Sebastian	"Tonight Again"
**2015** (29th)	Jarryd James	"Do You Remember"
**2016** (30th)
**2016** (30th)	**Flume**	**Skin**
**2016** (30th)	Bernard Fanning	Civil Dusk
**2016** (30th)	Guy Sebastian	"Black & Blue"
**2016** (30th)	Illy	"Papercuts" (featuring Vera Blue)
**2016** (30th)	Troye Sivan	Blue Neighbourhood
**2017** (31st)
**2017** (31st)	**Paul Kelly**	**Life Is Fine**
**2017** (31st)	D.D Dumbo	Utopia Defeated
**2017** (31st)	Dan Sultan	Killer
**2017** (31st)	Illy	Two Degrees
**2017** (31st)	Vance Joy	"Lay It on Me"
**2018** (32nd)
**2018** (32nd)	**Gurrumul**	**Djarimirri (Child of the Rainbow)**
**2018** (32nd)	Dan Sultan	Killer Under a Blood Moon
**2018** (32nd)	Dean Lewis	"Be Alright"
**2018** (32nd)	Troye Sivan	Bloom
**2018** (32nd)	Vance Joy	Nation of Two
**2019** (33rd)
**2019** (33rd)	**Dean Lewis**	**A Place We Knew**
**2019** (33rd)	Guy Sebastian	"Choir"
**2019** (33rd)	Hayden James	Between Us
**2019** (33rd)	Matt Corby	Rainbow Valley
**2019** (33rd)	Paul Kelly	Nature
**2020** (34th)
**2020** (34th)	**Archie Roach**	**Tell Me Why**
**2020** (34th)	Guy Sebastian	"Standing with You"
**2020** (34th)	Ruel	Free Time
**2020** (34th)	The Kid Laroi	F*ck Love
**2020** (34th)	Troye Sivan	In a Dream

== Multiple wins and nominations ==
The following individuals received two or more Best Male Artist awards:

Wins	Artist
3	Diesel
3	John Farnham
3	Alex Lloyd
3	Gotye
3	Paul Kelly
2	Jimmy Barnes
2	Nick Cave
2	Flume

The following individuals received two or more Best Male Artist nominations:

Nominations	Artist
18	Paul Kelly
7	John Farnham
7	Jimmy Barnes
7	Guy Sebastian
6	John Butler
5	Tex Perkins
5	Alex Lloyd
4	Diesel
4	Dan Kelly
4	Vance Joy
4	Ben Lee
4	Dan Sultan
4	Geoffrey Gurrumul Yunupingu
3	Nick Cave
3	Stephen Cummings
3	Gotye
3	Pete Murray
3	Josh Pyke
3	Troye Sivan
3	Keith Urban
3	Chris Wilson
2	Peter Blakeley
2	Daryl Braithwaite
2	Matt Corby
2	Paul Dempsey
2	Bob Evans
2	Bernard Fanning
2	Tim Finn
2	Flume
2	Dave Graney
2	Illy
2	Ed Kuepper
2	Dean Lewis
2	Paul Mac
2	Tim Rogers
2	Mark Seymour
