= Nature (Paul Kelly album) =

Studio album by Paul Kelly
- Released: 12 October 2018
- Label: EMI Music Australia

Paul Kelly chronology
Life Is Fine (2017)	Nature (2018)	Live in at the Sydney Opera House (2019)

Singles from Nature
- 1. "With the One I Love" Released: 10 August 2018; 2. "A Bastard Like Me" Released: 21 September 2018; 3. "And Death Shall Have No Dominion" Released: 14 December 2018

Nature is the 24th studio album by Australian musician Paul Kelly, released on 12 October 2018.

At the ARIA Music Awards of 2019, the album won Best Adult Contemporary Album.

== Background and recording ==
In August 2017, Paul Kelly released his 23rd studio album Life Is Fine. The album was a success, giving Kelly his first ever ARIA number-one album, and winning four ARIA Music Awards at the ARIA Music Awards of 2017.

With most of the songs written over the course of several years and dating back to the recording sessions for albums such as The Merri Soul Sessions, Seven Sonnets & a Song and Life Is Fine, Nature focuses on human nature's small place in the natural world. Kelly said: "I didn't realise I had the makings of another album until I put the songs in a folder and saw the titles staring me in the face. Sometimes you don't know what you're doing until you look back. I think of Nature as a companion piece to Life Is Fine, itself full of moons, rain, rocks, rivers, seas, smells and lovers."

"A bastard like me" was written to honour Aboriginal activist Charlie Perkins. The title of the song is taken from Perkins' autobiography, and the video features footage from his life.

== Reception ==
Professional ratings
Review scores
Source	Rating
AllMusic	3.5/5 stars
Herald Sun	3.5/5 stars
PopMatters	7/10 stars

Mikey Cahill from the Herald Sun described how Kelly in Nature is "staying relevant and relishing the opportunity to pump out another 12 mostly great songs." PopMatters' Steve Horowitz opined, "[he] put five classic poems by major writers on his latest album of a dozen songs... While it's wonderful that Kelly brings these words to life for non-poetry readers to enjoy, there is something tawdry about the whole affair."

Brian Parker from Your Music Radar indicated, "Conceptually this album works, where there is something otherworldly about it. It seems to question the existence of nature and the forces of nature, the human soul, the cycle of birth and death, and of the beauty of being alive, in love, but also the gravity of the inevitable."

== Track listing ==
All music written by Paul Kelly and Bill McDonald.

No.	Title	Writer(s)	Length
1.	"And Death Shall Have No Dominion"	Dylan Thomas	2:26
2.	"With the One I Love"	Paul Kelly	2:29
3.	"A Bastard Like Me"	Kelly	2:34
4.	"Little Wolf"	Kelly	2:54
5.	"With Animals"	Walt Whitman	2:23
6.	"Bound to Follow (Aisling Song)" (featuring Kate Miller-Heidke)	Kelly	4:06
7.	"Seagulls of Seattle"	Kelly	3:00
8.	"Morning Storm"	Kelly	3:00
9.	"Mushrooms"	Sylvia Plath	2:56
10.	"The River Song"	Kelly	2:12
11.	"God's Grandeur"	Gerard Manley Hopkins	2:17
12.	"The Trees"	Philip Larkin	2:23

== Personnel ==
- Paul Kelly – lead and backing vocals, acoustic and electric guitars
- Bill McDonald – bass guitar, arrangement
- Cameron Bruce – piano, keyboards, organ, backing vocals
- Ashley Naylor – lead guitar, backing vocals
- Dan Kelly - rhythm guitar, backing vocals
- Peter Luscombe – drums, percussion, backing vocals
- Kate Miller-Heidke – backing vocals on "Bound to Follow (Aisling Song)"
- Vika Bull – backing vocals
- Linda Bull – backing vocals
- Madeleine Kelly – backing vocals
- Memphis Kelly – backing vocals
- Alice Keath – backing vocals

== Charts ==
Chart (2018)	Peak position
Australian Albums (ARIA)	1
New Zealand Albums (RMNZ)	40
UK Americana Albums (OCC)	33

== See also ==
- List of number-one albums of 2018 (Australia)
