= Open Live =

Live album by Dan Sultan
- Released: 5 November 2015
- Recorded: 21 March 2015
- Venue: National Theatre, Melbourne
- Length: 63:47
- Label: Liberation

Dan Sultan chronology
Dirty Ground (2014)	Open Live (2015)	Killer (2017)

Open Live is the first live album by Australian musician Dan Sultan. The album was recorded at the National Theatre, Melbourne on 21 March 2015 during Sultan's Blackbird tour and released in November 2015. Upon announcement Sultan said "In case you missed my Open Live shows recently, we recorded a live album of these intimate and unique shows, where I even road-tested some new songs".

In July 2016, the album was nominated for Album of the Year at the National Indigenous Music Awards 2016.

== Reception ==
Leading Edge Music said "Earlier this year, Dan Sultan took to the stage of The National Theatre in St Kilda for a solo tour. He won the crowd over with his soulful vocals, masterful musicianship, keen sense of humour and good-old-Aussie charm."

== Track listing ==
No.	Title	Length
1.	"Under Your Skin"	4:25
2.	"Nobody Knows"	3:58
3.	"On the Leffy"	3:48
4.	"Man on TV"	4:36
5.	"Crazy"	6:15
6.	"Voices"	4:38
7.	"Old Fitzroy"	4:13
8.	"It Belongs to Us"	4:39
9.	"Mountaintop"	3:10
10.	"Dirty Ground"	3:30
11.	"Kimberley Calling"	5:31
12.	"The Same Man"	4:23
13.	"Forever"	5:54
14.	"Rattlesnake"	4:47

== Release history ==
Country	Date	Format	Label	Catalogue
Australia	6 November 2015	Digital download	Liberation	LMCD0283
