= Aviary Takes =

Studio album by Dan Sultan
- Released: 15 March 2019
- Studio: Aviary Studios, Melbourne
- Length: 48:12
- Label: Liberation
- Producer: Matt Redlich

Dan Sultan chronology
Killer Under a Blood Moon (2018)	Aviary Takes (2019)	Nali & Friends (2019)

Singles from Aviary Takes
- 1. "Love & Hate" Released: 22 February 2019

Aviary Takes is the fifth studio album by Australian musician Dan Sultan, released on 15 March 2019. The album sees Sultan recording acoustic and piano versions of his most celebrated tracks from his four studio albums to date, as well as three cover-versions.

Sultan said "Aviary Takes has been a very rewarding and fulfilling experience. I've been able to go over songs from my past catalogue and also record a few tunes from some of my favourite artists. It's very stripped back and it's the first time I've worked with the great and very talented Matt Redlich who produced the sessions."

The album promoted the album with a tour commencing in Hepburn Springs on 23 February and concluding in Port Macquarie on 11 May 2019. Upon announcement of the tour, Sultan said "I'm really looking forward to hitting the regional road with The Aviary Takes tour."

In July 2019, Aviary Takes was nominated for Album of the Year at the National Indigenous Music Awards.

At the ARIA Music Awards of 2019, the album was nominated for Best Blues and Roots Album.

== Reception ==
Professional ratings
Review scores
Source	Rating
The Newcastle Herald	3/5 stars

Josh Leeson from The Herald said "Mostly Aviary Takes is a re-interpretation of Sultan's extensive catalogue. Some tracks like 'Old Fitzroy' experience minor changes, while others like 'Kingdom' breathe with new vitality by being stripped bare. This is the reset Sultan needed."

== Track listing ==
No.	Title	Writer(s)	Length
1.	"Love & Hate"	Michael Kiwanuka	5:12
2.	"Drover"		2:52
3.	"Hold it Together"		4:00
4.	"Old Fitzroy"	Sultan; Scott Wilson	3:36
5.	"Dog Days Are Over"	Florence Welch; Isabella Summers	4:41
6.	"Kingdom"		4:19
7.	"It Belongs to Us"		3:57
8.	"Lonesome Tears"	Sultan	3:54
9.	"Look at Miss Ohio"	Gillian Welch; David Rawlings	4:15
10.	"Walk Through My Dream"		3:30
11.	"Magnetic"	Sultan; Quartermain; Jan Skubiszewski	4:17
12.	"Should've Known"		3:39

== Charts ==
Chart (2019)	Peak position
Australian Albums (ARIA)	47

== Release history ==
Country	Date	Format	Label	Catalogue
Australia	15 March 2019	Digital download, CD, streaming	Liberation	LRCD0013
