= The Merri Soul Sessions =

Studio album by Paul Kelly
- Released: 12 December 2014
- Recorded: May 2014; Northcote
- Genre: Soul
- Length: 41:08
- Label: Gawdaggie/Universal
- Producers: Paul Kelly, Steve Schram

Paul Kelly chronology
Goin' Your Way (2013)	The Merri Soul Sessions (2014)	Seven Sonnets and a Song (2016)

Singles from The Merri Soul Sessions
- 1. "The Merri Soul Singles, Volume 1" Released: July 2014; 2. "The Merri Soul Singles, Volume 2" Released: August 2014; 3. "The Merri Soul Singles, Volume 3" Released: October 2014; 4. "The Merri Soul Singles, Volume 4" Released: November 2014

The Merri Soul Sessions or Paul Kelly Presents: The Merri Soul Sessions is the twentieth studio album by Australian musician, Paul Kelly, which was issued on 12 December 2014 on his own label, Gawdaggie Records, and distributed by Universal Music Australia. Kelly provided lead vocals on two of its eleven tracks, the rest featured vocals by either Clairy Browne, sisters Vika and Linda Bull, Kira Puru, or Dan Sultan. The album debuted at No. 17 on the ARIA Albums Chart.

== Background ==
The Merri Soul Sessions is the twentieth studio album by Australian musician, Paul Kelly, which was issued on 12 December 2014 on his own label, Gawdaggie Records, and distributed by Universal Music Australia. Kelly had developed the concept after hearing Vika Bull sing lead vocals on her live version of his song, "Sweet Guy" – originally released as a single in June 1989 – during touring as a backing singer in his group. For the album Kelly provided lead vocals on two tracks and invited various vocalists to sing lead on the other nine of eleven tracks. Tracks feature lead vocals by Vika Bull, Linda Bull (Vika's sister), Clairy Browne, Kira Puru or Dan Sultan.

The album was recorded live-in-the-studio in Northcote, with Kelly co-producing with Steve Schram (Clairy Browne & The Bangin' Rackettes), alongside the Merri Creek, which gave the album its name. Kelly explained his concept to Australian Musician's junocreative, "I started to imagine a soul revue type record performed live in the studio with a variety of singers and the one band."

Prior to the album's appearance Kelly released four double A-sided 7" vinyl singles, "The Merri Soul Singles, Volume 1" (July 2014), "The Merri Soul Singles, Volume 2" (August), "The Merri Soul Singles, Volume 3" (October) and "The Merri Soul Singles, Volume 4" (November). Kelly promoted the album with a national tour from January to February 2015. He was supported by Hiatus Kaiyote, a neo-soul quartet from Melbourne.

== Reception ==
On the ARIA Albums Chart, The Merri Soul Sessions peaked at No. 17. Noel Mengel of News Limited's website, news.com.au, rated the album as four out of five stars and felt "[i]t's one of those records where you feel the spirit start to finish, nothing too fussed over, no one going through the motions. There's desperation in the lyrics and a lot of joy in the delivery. And all the best soul music has those two essential ingredients."

Michael Dwyer of The Age praised Browne's vocals on "Keep on Coming Back for More", which had been performed live by Kelly four years earlier on The A – Z Recordings (September 2010, as "I Keep on Coming Back for More"), as a track that was "waiting for Browne's extraordinary voice to send it up in flames." Kelly's nephew, Dan Kelly, was "firing jolts of electric guitar across the bow" while "Kelly rocks back and holds down the tense rhythm. Despite the modest tools at hand, it seems less likely the song will fall apart than that Browne will blow it inside out." Kelly agreed that some of his songs were better when sung by other vocalists. Charles Pitter of PopMatters was of the view that "the band and vocal performances show off the breadth of Australia's talent and the songs are of consistently high standard".

== Track listing ==
All tracks are written by Paul Kelly, unless otherwise indicated

No.	Title	Writer(s)	Lead vocalist(s)	Length
1.	"Smells Like Rain"	Kev Carmody, Kelly, Dan Sultan	Linda Bull	5:48
2.	"What You Want"	Kelly, Sultan	Vika Bull	3:34
3.	"Keep on Coming Back for More"		Clairy Browne	3:13
4.	"Sweet Guy"		Vika Bull	4:30
5.	"Righteous Woman"		Paul Kelly	3:21
6.	"Don't Let a Good Thing Go"	Kelly, William "Billy" Miller	Dan Sultan	3:47
7.	"Where Were You When I Needed You"		Clairy Browne	4:29
8.	"Thank You"		Paul Kelly	2:58
9.	"I Don't Know What I'd Do"		Kira Puru	2:36
10.	"Down on the Jetty"	Linda Bull, Paul Kelly	Linda Bull, Vika Bull	3:01
11.	"Hasn't It Rained"	Cameron Bruce, Linda Bull, Vika Bull, Kelly, Peter Luscombe, Bill McDonald, Ashley Naylor	Linda Bull, Vika Bull	3:51

== Personnel ==
Musicians

- Clairy Browne – lead vocals, backing vocals
- Cameron Bruce – keyboards
- Linda Bull – lead vocals, backing vocals
- Vika Bull – lead vocals, backing vocals
- Dan Kelly – guitar
- Paul Kelly – rhythm guitar, vocals
- Peter Luscombe – drums, percussion
- Bill McDonald – bass guitar
- Ashley Naylor – guitar
- Kira Puru – lead vocals, backing vocals
- Dan Sultan – lead vocals, backing vocals

Recording details

- Paul Kelly – producer
- Bruce Lucey – mastering
- Steven Schram – engineer, mixing, producer

Artwork

- Andy Doherty – booklet
- Jeff Fasano – cover art
- Paul Kelly – liner notes
- Mark Roper – cover art
- Peter Salmon-Lomas – artwork, design

== Chart performance ==
Chart (2014/15)	Peak position
Australian Albums (ARIA)	17
