= LYAO =

Live album by Arj Barker
- Released: January 26, 2010
- Genre: Stand-up comedy
- Label: Warner Bros.

Arj Barker chronology
Issue Were Here (1999)	LYAO (2010)

Professional ratings
Review scores
Source	Rating
Allmusic	3/5 stars

LYAO is the second live album from stand-up comedian Arj Barker. Warner Bros. Records/Degenerate Records comic Arj Barker released his second comedy album, LYAO, on Tuesday, January 26, 2010, after the Comedy Central special premiered Saturday, Jan. 23. LYAO is also available on CD/DVD and standalone DVD.

== Track listing ==
1. LOL
2. <3
3. WTF
4. GTFO
5. ROFL
6. HFS
7. SOS
8. LMAO
9. JK
10. HAHA
11. OMG
12. BFF
