= Dan Sultan =

Indigenous Australian singer

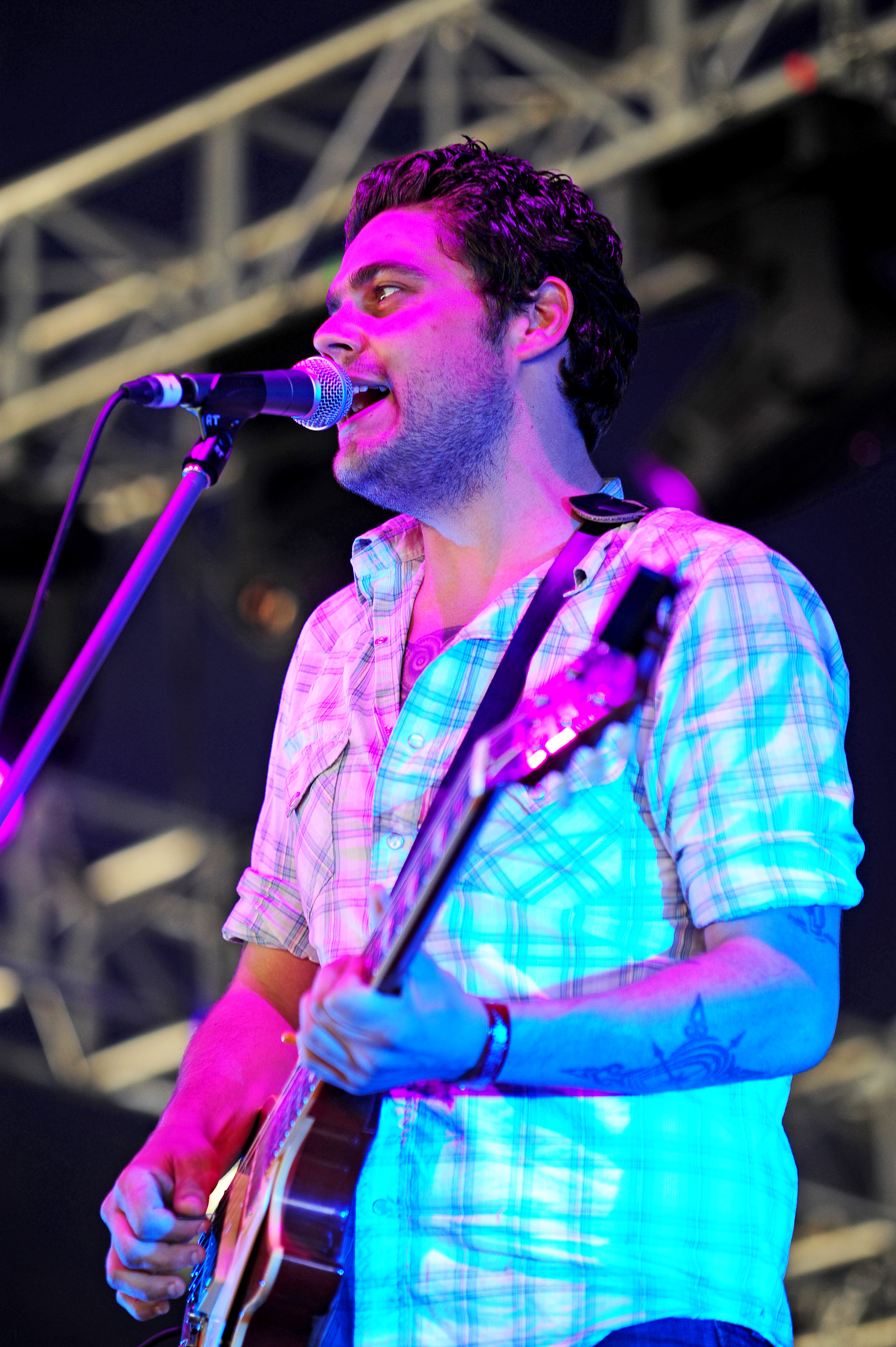
- Southbound Festival, Busselton, January 2011

Background information
- Born: Daniel Leo Sultan; December 1983 (age 42); Melbourne, Victoria, Australia
- Occupation: Singer-songwriter
- Instruments: Vocals; guitar; drums; piano; mandolin; organ; bass guitar; percussion
- Years active: 1996–present
- Labels: MGM Distribution; Liberation; ABC Music
- Website: dansultan.com

Daniel Leo Sultan is an Australian alternative rock singer-songwriter and guitarist, actor and author. At the ARIA Music Awards of 2010 he won Best Male Artist and Best Blues & Roots Album for his second album, Get Out While You Can (November 2009). At the 2014 ceremony he won Best Rock Album for Blackbird (April 2014), which had reached number four on the ARIA Albums Chart. In 2017, Sultan's record Killer was nominated for three ARIA awards: Best Male Artist, Best Rock Album, and Best Independent Release. Sultan's debut children's music album Nali & Friends was named Best Children's Album at the ARIA Music Awards of 2019.

== Early life ==
Sultan is a Arrente/Gurindji man.

Sultan started playing guitar at four and wrote his first song at ten. His mother's friend gave him an "old, clapped-out electric guitar" and, when living in Fitzroy, he began singing at local pubs. In 2000 he met Scott Wilson, a guitarist, at a Williamstown pub's karaoke night and the pair began writing tracks together. Wilson later recalled "What struck me at first was that he could play piano and guitar and he was a great foil for what I was doing... After a while playing together he said, 'Can I sing this one?' I said, 'Do you know the words?'... [he had a] mighty voice. A lot of people can play guitar... Not many can sing like that."

== Career ==
=== 2006–2008: Homemade Biscuits ===
Sultan released his debut solo album, Homemade Biscuits on 13 March 2006, with most tracks written by Scott Wilson or co-written by Sultan and Scott Wilson. It was produced by Scott Wilson at Flowerpress Studios, Newport, and True Form Services, Spotswood. Other performers on the album were Lazare Agnekis, Neil Gray, Elijah Maiyah, Lochile McKlean and Ben Wicks. He received the financial assistance of John Butler's Seed program.

At the 2007 Deadly Awards, Sultan won the Single Release of the Year for "Your Love Is Like a Song", which was co-written with Wilson. He performed his self-written track, "Roslyn", at the National Sorry Day concert in May 2007, which describes his mother, a member of the stolen generation, removed from her family when she was six or seven.

Sultan and Wilson were invited by Paul Kelly to record a cover version of "This Land Is Mine", originally by singer-songwriter Kev Carmody, for a various artists tribute album of Carmody's work, Cannot Buy My Soul which was released in February 2007. They also performed at two concerts of the same name: the Sydney Festival in January 2008 and Queensland Music Festival in August 2009. In January 2008 Sultan's backing band consisted of Eugene Ball on trumpet, Ben Gillespie on trombone, Joshua Jones on bass guitar, Peter Marin on drums, Ash Naylor on guitar and Gina Woods on keyboards. Sultan and his band have performed at Australian music festivals.

=== 2009–2013: Get Out While You Can ===
Dan Sultan in 2010

In November 2009, Sultan released his second studio album, Get Out While You Can, which peaked in the ARIA Albums Chart top 100 in late May 2010 – six months after it was issued. It reached No. 1 on the independent Australian charts and was a Triple J feature album. Sultan describes his music as "country soul rock'n'roll". At the ARIA Music Awards of 2010 he won Best Male Artist and Best Blues & Roots Album for Get Out While You Can. In October that year, he also won Best Independent Artist and Best Independent Blues & Roots Album at the Australian Independent Record Awards (AIR Awards).

=== 2014–2018: Blackbird, Dirty Ground and Killer ===
In February 2014 Sultan supported Bruce Springsteen's Melbourne and Hunter Valley gigs on his Australian tour.

In April 2014, Sultan released his third studio album Blackbird, which reached No. 4 on the ARIA Albums Chart and spent thirteen weeks in the Top 50. At the ARIA Awards in November that year Blackbird won Best Rock Album. Also in November he released his first extended play, Dirty Ground, which reached the ARIA Albums top 100. On 13 November 2015, Sultan released Open Live, a live album recorded at his sold-out National Theatre show of his Blackbird tour.

On 28 July 2017, Sultan's released his fourth studio album Killer, which was produced by Jan Skubiszewski. The album peaked at number 5 on the ARIA charts was nominated for three ARIA awards.

On 19 May 2018, Sultan released his collaborative EP titled Killer Under a Blood Moon which saw Sultan re-record songs from this Killer album with other Australian artists.

In June 2018, Sultan postponed the balance of a national tour after criticism of a live performance and issues with alcohol abuse.

=== 2019–2022: Aviary Takes and Nali & Friends ===
In March 2019, Sultan released his fifth studio album Aviary Takes, which was preluded with the lead single "Love & Hate" released on 22 February 2019.

In April 2019, Sultan released his sixth studio and first children's album Nali & Friends. Produced by Jan Skubiszewski and released by ABC Music, Nali & Friends debuted at #1 on the Australian iTunes Children's charts, and was named Best Children's Album at the ARIA Music Awards of 2019.

Sultan published his first children's book, Nali (co-written with Rhys Graham), in December 2019.

=== 2023: Signing with Unified, Dan Sultan & Little Miracles ===
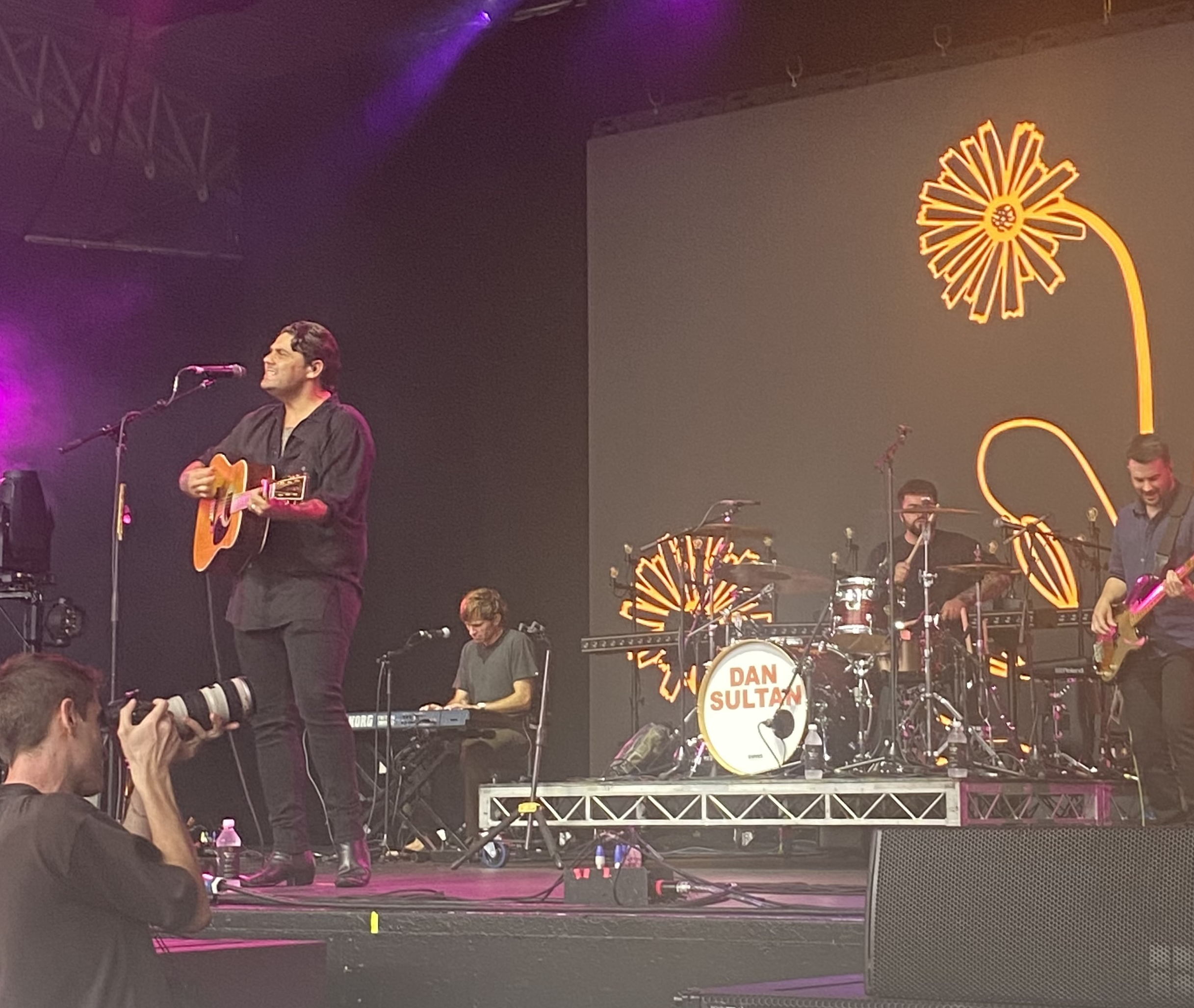
Dan Sultan performing in Melbourne 2024 at Sidney Myer Music Bowl

On 16 February 2023, it was confirmed that Sultan had signed with Unified Management, ahead of his single "Story", which was released on 23 February 2023.

In May 2023, Sultan announced the release of his self-titled seventh studio album, released on 18 August 2023. The album peaked at number 15 on the ARIA charts.

In July 2026 Sultan announced his eighth studio album Little Miracles would be released on 23 October 2026.

== Other projects ==
Sultan made his screen debut in the 2009 feature film Bran Nue Dae, alongside Geoffrey Rush, Missy Higgins and Jessica Mauboy.

Sultan is a sometime member of Black Arm Band, a loose collection of various indigenous musicians. He was also involved in Paul Kelly's The Merri Soul Sessions project.

== Personal life ==
Sultan married Bronnie Jane Lee and has two children.

On 28 February 2020, Sultan was charged with indecent assault by Victoria Police over a September 2008 incident in Melbourne. The charges led Sultan to withdraw from performing at the Perth Festival (which he was headlining), the Port Fairy Folk Festival (both scheduled to take place the following week), and the Parrtjima Festival in Alice Springs in April 2020. The charges were dropped by Victorian police and struck out during a hearing in Melbourne Magistrates Court in November 2020.

== Discography ==
=== Studio albums ===
Title	Details	Peak chart positions	Certifications
Title	Details	AUS	Certifications
Homemade Biscuits	Released: 13 March 2006; Label: Self-released; Format: CD, digital download	—	
Get Out While You Can	Released: 6 November 2009; Label: Self-released; Format: CD, digital download	90	
Blackbird	Released: 4 April 2014; Label: Liberation; Format: CD, digital download	4	ARIA: Gold
Killer	Released: 28 July 2017; Label: Liberation; Format: CD, LP, digital download	5	
Aviary Takes	Released: 15 March 2019; Label: Liberation; Format: CD, digital download, streaming	47	
Nali & Friends	Released: 12 April 2019; Label: ABC Kids, Universal; Format: CD, digital download, streaming	157	
Dan Sultan	Released: 18 August 2023; Label: Liberation Music; Format: CD, digital download, streaming	15	
Little Miracles	Released: 23 October 2026; Label: Mushroom Music; Format: CD, digital download, streaming	5	
"—" denotes a recording that did not chart or was not released in that territory.

=== Live albums ===
Title	Details	Peak chart positions
Title	Details	AUS
Open Live	Released: 5 November 2015; Label: Liberation; Format: CD, digital download; Recorded in Melbourne on 21 March 2015	—
Live at Tubowgule (Sydney Opera House)	Released: 20 March 2026; Label: Mushroom; Format: LP, digital download; Recorded at Sydney Opera House in March 2025	59

=== Extended plays ===
Title	Details	Peak chart positions
Title	Details	AUS
Dirty Ground	Released: 7 November 2014; Label: Liberation; Format: CD, digital download	66
Killer Under a Blood Moon	Released: 18 May 2018; Label: Liberation; Format: CD, digital download, streaming	66

=== Singles ===
==== As lead artist ====
Title	Year	Chart peak positions	Album
Title	Year	AUS	Album
"Your Love Is Like a Song"	2006	—	Homemade Biscuits
"Old Fitzroy"	2010	—	Get Out While You Can
"Letter"	2010	—	Get Out While You Can
"Running Away" (with The Verses)	2010	—	Non-album single
"Goddess Love" / "Walk Through My Dream"	2011	—	Get Out While You Can
"Under Your Skin"	2013	110	Blackbird
"The Same Man"	2014	146	Blackbird
"Kimberley Calling"	2014	—	Blackbird
"Dirty Ground"	2014	—	Dirty Ground
"Magnetic"	2016	—	Killer
"Hold It Together"	2017	—	Killer
"Kingdom"	2017	—	Killer
"Forever Now" (with Isabella Manfredi)	2017	—	Non-album single
"Killer" (featuring Camp Cope)	2018	—	Killer Under a Blood Moon
"Reaction" (featuring Meg Mac)	2018	—	Killer Under a Blood Moon
"Love & Hate"	2019	—	Aviary Takes
"Nali"	2019	—	Nali & Friends
"Bwindi"	2019	—	Nali & Friends
"Every Day My Mother's Voice" (with Paul Kelly)	2019	—	Songs from the South: 1985–2019
"Tarred and Feathered"	2021	—	Non-album single
"Story"	2023	—	Dan Sultan
"Won't Give You That"	2023	—	Dan Sultan
"Wait Love"	2023	—	Dan Sultan
"Took the Children Away"	2023	—	Mushroom: Fifty Years of Making Noise (Reimagined)
"Ringing in My Ears"	2023	—	Dan Sultan
"Fortress" (with Julia Stone)	2023	—	Dan Sultan
"Do You See Me"	2024	—	Non-album single
"Needing Love"	2026	—	Little Miracles
"Forgiveness"	2026	—	Little Miracles
"There's a River"	2026	—	Little Miracles
"Atlas"	2026	—	Little Miracles
"Can’t Be for Nothing"	2026	—	Little Miracles

==== As featured artist ====
Title	Year	Chart peak positions	Certifications	Album
Title	Year	AUS Digital Sales	Certifications	Album
"Running Away" (with Verses)	2010	—		Seasons
"January 26" (with A.B. Original)	2016	—	ARIA: Gold	Reclaim Australia
"I Never" (Strings version) (The Bamboos featuring Dan Sultan)	2019	—		By Special Arrangement
"Gadigal Land" (with Midnight Oil featuring Joel Davison, Kaleena Briggs & Bunna Lawrie)	2020	5		The Makarrata Project
"Who Can It Be Now" (Triple J - Like a Version) (Jem Cassar-Daley featuring Dan Sultan)	2026	—		
"—" denotes a recording that did not chart or was not released in that territory.

=== Other appearances ===
Title	Artist	Year	Album
"This Land is Mine"	Various artists	2007	Cannot Buy My Soul
"For My People"	Direct Influence	2010	War in My Kitchen
"Bran Nue Dae"	Various artists	2010	Bran Nue Day
"Seeds That You Might Sow"	Various artists	2010	Bran Nue Day
"Nyul Nyul Girl"	Various artists	2010	Bran Nue Day
"Black Girl"	Various artists	2010	Bran Nue Day
"Shark Attack"(with The Break)	Various artists	2010	He Will Have His Way
"Just Keep Walking"	INXS	2010	Original Sin
"Deanna"	Various artists	2012	Straight to You – triple j's Tribute to Nick Cave
"There Is a Kingdom" (with Kram & Lisa Mitchell)	Various artists	2012	Straight to You – triple j's Tribute to Nick Cave
"Get Ready for Love"	Various artists	2012	Straight to You – triple j's Tribute to Nick Cave
"Rattle Snake"	Way of the Eagle	2013	Rattle Snake
"Hold Back the Night" (with Ella Hooper)	Various artists	2013	RockWiz Volume 4
"With a Little Help from My Friends" (with Ella Hooper)	Various artists	2013	RockWiz Volume 4
"Rumble, Young Man, Rumble"	Hilltop Hoods	2014	Walking Under Stars
"The Biggest Disappointment"	Missy Higgins	2014	Oz
"Don't Let a Good Thing Go"	Paul Kelly	2014	The Merri Soul Sessions
"When the Saints Go Marching In"	Various artists	2015	Saints Unplugged
"Manjana" (with Emma Donovan)	Archie Roach	2016	Charcoal Lane: 25th Anniversary Collection
"The Wheels on the Bus"	Play School	2016	Famous Friends: Celebrating 50 Years of Play School
"Australia"	The Wiggles	2018	Wiggle Pop
"It's Important"	Damien Dempsey	2018	Union
"You're the One That I Want"	Delta Goodrem	2018	I Honestly Love You
"Fitzroy Crossing"	Various artists	2019	Deadly Hearts 2
"Into My Arms"	Various artists	2020	Songs for Australia
"Change the Date" (with Gurrumul Yunupingu)	Midnight Oil	2020	The Makarrata Project

== Awards and nominations ==
=== AIR Awards ===
The Australian Independent Record Awards (commonly known informally as AIR Awards) is an annual awards night to recognise, promote and celebrate the success of Australia's Independent Music sector.

Year	Nominee / work	Award	Result	Ref.
2010	himself	Best Independent Artist	Won	
2010	Get Out While You Can	Best Independent Album	Nominated	
2010	Get Out While You Can	Best Independent Blues and Roots Album	Won	
2014	Blackbird	Best Independent Blues and Roots Album	Won	
2017	"January 26" (with A.B. Original)	Best Independent Single/EP	Won	
2018	Killer	Best Independent Blues and Roots Album	Nominated	
2019	Killer Under a Blood Moon	Best Independent Blues and Roots Album	Nominated	
2024	Dan Sultan	Best Independent Blues and Roots Album or EP	Won	

=== APRA Awards ===
The APRA Awards are presented annually from 1982 by the Australasian Performing Right Association (APRA), "honouring composers and songwriters".

Year	Nominee / work	Award	Result	Ref.
2011	"Letter" (Dan Sultan, Scott Wilson)	Breakthrough Songwriter of the Year	Nominated	
2014	"Under Your Skin" (Dan Sultan, Alexander Burnett, Pip Norman)	Song of the Year	Shortlisted	
2015	"Kimberley Calling" (Dan Sultan)	Song of the Year	Nominated	
2015	"The Same Man" (Dan Sultan, Pip Norman)	Rock of the Year	Nominated	
2015	"Under Your Skin" (Dan Sultan, Alexander Burnett, Pip Norman)	Rock of the Year	Nominated	
2018	"Hold It Together" (Dan Sultan, Alexander Burnett)	Song of the Year	Shortlisted	
2019	"Every Day My Mother's Voice" (with Paul Kelly) for The Final Quarter	Best Original Song Composed for the Screen	Won	
2020	"Every Day My Mother's Voice" (with Paul Kelly)	Song of the Year	Shortlisted	
2021	"Gadigal Land" by Midnight Oil featuring Dan Sultan, Joel Davison, Kaleena Briggs & Bunna Lawrie	Song of the Year	Won	
2024	"Story"	Song of the Year	Shortlisted	

=== ARIA Music Awards ===
The ARIA Music Awards is an annual awards ceremony that recognises excellence, innovation, and achievement across all genres of Australian music. Sultan has won 4 awards from 18 nominations.

Year	Nominee / work	Award	Result	Ref.
2010	Get Out While You Can	Best Male Artist	Won	
2010	Get Out While You Can	Best Blues & Roots Album	Won	
2010	Get Out While You Can	Best Independent Release	Nominated	
2014	Blackbird	Album of the Year	Nominated	
2014	Blackbird	Best Male Artist	Nominated	
2014	Blackbird	Best Independent Release	Nominated	
2014	Blackbird	Best Rock Album	Won	
2014	Blackbird Album Tour	Best Australian Live Act	Nominated	
2017	Killer	Best Male Artist	Nominated	
2017	Killer	Best Rock Album	Nominated	
2017	Killer	Best Independent Release	Nominated	
2018	Killer Under a Blood Moon	Best Male Artist	Nominated	
2018	Killer Under a Blood Moon	Best Adult Contemporary Album	Nominated	
2019	Aviary Takes	Best Blues & Roots Album	Nominated	
2019	Nali & Friends	Best Children's Album	Won	
2023	Dan Sultan	Best Solo Artist	Nominated	
2023	Dan Sultan	Best Adult Contemporary Album	Won	
2023	Dan Sultan	Best Independent Release	Nominated	

=== The Deadly Awards ===
The Deadly Awards, commonly known simply as The Deadlys, was an annual celebration of Australian Aboriginal and Torres Strait Islander achievement in music, sport, entertainment and community. The ran from 1995 to 2013.

Year	Nominee / work	Award	Result
2006	himself	Most Promising New Talent	Won
2007	"Your Love is Like a Song"	Single of the Year	Won
2010	himself	Artist of the Year	Won
2010	"Letter"	Single of the Year	Won

=== J Awards ===
The J Awards are an annual series of Australian music awards that were established by the Australian Broadcasting Corporation's youth-focused radio station Triple J. They commenced in 2005.

Year	Nominee / work	Award	Result	Ref.
2017	himself	Double J Artist of the Year	Nominated	

=== Music Victoria Awards ===
The Music Victoria Awards, are an annual awards night celebrating Victorian music. They commenced in 2005 (although nominee and winners are unknown from 2005 to 2012).

Year	Nominee / work	Award	Result	Ref.
2013	himself	Best Indigenous Act	Nominated	
2014	Blackbird	Best Album	Won	
2014	Blackbird	Best Male Artist	Won	
2015	himself	Best Indigenous Act	Nominated	
2017	himself	Best Male	Nominated	
2017	himself	Best Aboriginal Act	Nominated	

=== National Indigenous Music Awards ===
The National Indigenous Music Awards recognise excellence, innovation and leadership among Aboriginal and Torres Strait Islander musicians from throughout Australia. They commenced in 2004.

Year	Nominee / work	Award	Result	Ref.
2011	himself	Act of the Year	Nominated	
2014	himself	Artist of the Year	Nominated	
2014	Blackbird	Album of the Year	Won	
2014	Blackbird	Cover Art of the Year	Won	
2014	"Under Your Skin"	Film Clip of the Year	Nominated	
2014	"The Same Man"	Song of the Year	Won	
2015	himself	Artist of the Year	Won	
2015	"Dirty Ground"	Film Clip of the Year	Nominated	
2015	"Dirty Ground"	Song of the Year	Nominated	
2016	himself	Artist of the Year	Nominated	
2016	Open LIVE – Live from the National Theatre, Melbourne	Album of the Year	Nominated	
2017	himself	Artist of the Year	Nominated	
2017	"Magnetic"	Film Clip of the Year	Nominated	
2017	"January 26" (with A.B. Original)	Film Clip of the Year	Won	
2017	"January 26" (with A.B. Original)	Song of the Year	Won	
2018	"Kingdom"	Song of the Year	Nominated	
2018	Killer	Album of the Year	Nominated	
2019	Avairy Takes	Album of the Year	Nominated	
2024	Dan Sultan	Album of the Year	Won	

=== National Live Music Awards ===
The National Live Music Awards (NLMAs) are a broad recognition of Australia's diverse live industry, celebrating the success of the Australian live scene. The awards commenced in 2016.

Year	Nominee / work	Award	Result	Ref.
2017	Dan Sultan	Live Blues and Roots Act of the Year	Won	
2018	Dan Sultan	Live Blues and Roots Act of the Year	Nominated	

=== Screen Music Awards ===
Year	Nominee / work	Award	Result	Ref.
2019	"Every Day My Mother's Voice" (with Paul Kelly)	Best Original Song Composed for the Screen	Won	

=== South Australian Music Awards ===
The South Australian Music Awards (previously known as the Fowler's Live Music Awards) are annual awards that exist to recognise, promote and celebrate excellence in the South Australian contemporary music industry. They commenced in 2012.

Year	Nominee / work	Award	Result (wins only)	Ref.
2017	"January 26" (A.B. Original featuring Dan Sultan)	Best Song	Won	
2017	"January 26" (A.B. Original featuring Dan Sultan)	Best Video	Won	
