= Issue Were Here =

Live album by Arj Barker
- Released: 1999
- Genre: Stand-up comedy
- Length: 51:00
- Label: Arj Barker

Arj Barker chronology
| Issue Were Here (1999) | Arj Barker: LYAO (2010) |

Issue Were Here is the debut live album from stand-up comedian Arj Barker, which is a recording from a live performance at the 1999 Sydney International Comedy Festival in Australia.

== Track listing ==
1. "Intro" – 1:45
2. "Aussie Issues" – 3:11
3. "Flying High Again" – 6:34
4. "Love Is Weird" – 6:03
5. "Techno - Bark" – 4:00
6. "Food Is Weird" – 2:11
7. "Shmoky Shmoky" – 7:48
8. "Behold The Riff Master" – 2:45
9. "Prequel Wars" – 3:45
10. "The Lesson" – 2:06
11. "Inappropriate" – 4:28
12. "Money Matters" – 3:34
13. "The Solution" – 1:54
14. "Adults, Kids and Senior Citizens Only" – 0:31
15. "Thank-you and Goodnight" – 0:33
