= Little Miracles =

Studio album by Dan Sultan
- Released: 23 October 2026
- Length: 36:53
- Label: Mushroom
- Producer: Guy Chambers

Dan Sultan chronology
Live at Tubowgule (Sydney Opera House) (2026)	Little Miracles (2026)

Singles from Little Miracles
- 1. "Needing Love" Released: 19 June 2026; 2. "Forgiveness" Released: 10 July 2026; 3. "There's a River" Released: 4 September 2026; 4. "Atlas" Released: 9 October 2026; 5. "Can't Be for Nothing" Released: 23 October 2026

Little Miracles is the eighth studio album by the Australian musician Dan Sultan, released on 23 October 2026. The album was announced in July 2026 alongside the release of the title track as the second single.

The album was written and recorded in three weeks with producer Guy Chambers and mastered at Abbey Road Studios in London.

In a statement, Sultan said: "'Forgiveness' speaks to finding true peace with your journey, the desire to be forgiven, and to also know true forgiveness for others. It is about being free from resentments towards your own actions and the actions of other people. Everyone has regrets to an extent, and it's not about running from them, but more so finding peace with them. A peace that can help you move forward with strength and stability. A peace that can also help you know forgiveness for others. This will ultimately lead to true happiness."

Upon release, Sultan said, "Little Miracles is truly magical. The way the stars aligned for my collaborators and I on this beautiful album is something I'll always cherish. It is lightning in a bottle and I'’ve made my greatest work to date."

== Reception ==
Al Newstead from Australian Broadcasting Corporation called the album a "career-best effort" saying "Sultan's signature love of blues, rock, and soul is effortlessly mixed with a distinctly British flavour. A tasty gumbo of McCartney craft, spicy Stones (both Rolling Stones and Roses) swagger, and healthy sprinklings of anthemic balladeering à la Elton John and Robbie Williams. These are unashamedly big, major-key tunes that feel familiar without merely aping their influences, showing off Sultan's range and power as he sings earnestly about the importance of family, finding meaningful purpose and lasting contentment."

Harry Webber from Life Without Andy said "The new album is clinical, meticulous and wholly beautiful. You wouldn't call it a reinvention of his sound, but you'd be hard-pressed to find an artist operating at the peak of their powers quite like Sultan is here."

Jade Kennedy from Rolling Stone Australia called the album a "ten-track collection that moves through themes of love, forgiveness, reflection, and finding meaning in life's unexpected moments."

== Track listing ==
All lyrics are written by Dan Sultan and Guy Chambers, except "Piece of Mind" and "Here for Love" (lyrics by Sultan); all music is composed by Dan Sultan and Guy Chambers, except where noted.

Little Miracles track listing
No.	Title	Music	Length
1.	"There's a River"	Dan Sultan; Guy Chambers; Charlie Hole; Harry O'Brien	4:16
2.	"Peace of Mind"		3:43
3.	"Forgiveness"		4:24
4.	"Can't Be for Nothing"		3:19
5.	"Needing Love"		2:58
6.	"Find the Light"		3:43
7.	"Sunshower"		3:17
8.	"One Star at a Time"		3:17
9.	"Atlas"		3:08
10.	"Here for Love"	Sultan; Joel Quartermain; Julia Stone	4:48
Total length:			36:53

== Personnel ==
Credits are adapted from Tidal.

- Dan Sultan – vocals, background vocals (all tracks); electric guitar (tracks 1–4, 6–10), acoustic guitar (1–4, 6, 8–10), piano (3, 4, 8–10), percussion (3, 5–9)
- Guy Chambers – production, piano (all tracks); electric guitar (1–4, 9), Hammond organ (1, 3, 5, 6), acoustic guitar (1, 3, 7), vibraphone (1, 7, 9), electric piano (1, 9), synthesizer (2, 3, 6–8), percussion (3, 5), bass guitar (4), Clavinet (7), harpsichord (8)
- Simon Todkill – engineering
- Stephen Power – mixing
- Miles Showell – mastering
- Jeremy Stacey – drums (1–4, 6–10)
- David Catlin-Birch – bass guitar (1–4, 6–9)
- Harry O'Brien – background vocals (1)
- Andrew Playfoot – background vocals (2, 3, 5–7, 10)
- Amelie Watson – background vocals (2, 4, 5, 7–10)
- Ian Burdge – cello (4, 6, 10)
- Bruce White – viola (4, 6, 10)
- Marianne Haynes – violin (4, 6, 10)
- Kelly Jade Williams – background vocals (5, 7, 10)
- Lena Lee Sultan – piano (9)
- Wilder Lee Sultan – piano (9)
- Joel Quartermain – bass guitar (10)

== Charts ==
Chart performance for Little Miracles
Chart (2026)	Peak position
Australian Albums (ARIA)	5

== Release history ==
Release history and formats for Little Miracles
Country	Date	Format	Label	Catalogue
Australia	23 October 2026	Digital download; streaming; CD; LP	Mushroom Music	MUSH047CD / MUSH047LP
