= One Year of Ska =

Compilation album by Melbourne Ska Orchestra
- Released: 5 April 2019
- Label: Four Four Music, UMA

Melbourne Ska Orchestra chronology
Transmission Fridays (2019)	One Year of Ska (2019)	Live at The Triffid (2020)

One Year of Ska is a 4-disc compilation box set by Australian ska band, Melbourne Ska Orchestra, compiling the four albums released in the past twelve months. The album was released in April 2019.

At the ARIA Music Awards of 2019, the album won the ARIA Award for Best World Music Album.

== Track listing ==
Volume 1 - Ska Classics

1. "Al Capone"
2. "Botheration"
3. "Carry Go Bring Home"
4. "Confucious"
5. "Feel Like Jumpin'"
6. "Frankenstein"
7. "Man in the Street"
8. "Message to Rudy"
9. "Monkey Man"
10. "Nightboat to Cairo"
11. "Rockfort Rock"
12. "Run Joe"
13. "Simmer Down"

Volume 2 - TV & Movie Themes

1. "Austin Powers"
2. "Curb Your Enthusiasm"
3. "Dr. Who"
4. "Family Guy"
5. "Flintstones"
6. "Game of Thrones"
7. "Hogan's Heroes"
8. "James Bond"
9. "Monty Python"
10. "Narcos"
11. "Pink Panther"
12. "Skippy"
13. "Star Wars"

Volume 3 - Read All About It!

1. "Perfect Storm"
2. "Bus Driver"
3. "Good Days Bad Days"
4. "Change Your Mind"
5. "Kenji San"
6. "City In His Head"
7. "What You Said and What You Did"
8. "Ska Noir"
9. "Movin' On"
10. "Don't Mumble"
11. "Stupidology"
12. "Travellin' Light"
13. "Live That Life"

Volume 4 - Transmission Fridays

1. "Hail That Taxi"
2. "Shape I'm In"
3. "56 Days to Go"
4. "Billie's Longshot Bounce"
5. "Judge And Jury"
6. "Now It's Gone"
7. "Just Walk Away"
8. "Them from Ska Patrol"
9. "Beans and Rice"
10. "Earthquake"
11. "Love At First Sight"
12. "Generation's Gone"
13. "Magnolia Springtime"
