= Nali & Friends =

Children's music album by Dan Sultan

Studio album by Dan Sultan
- Released: 12 April 2019
- Studio: Red Moon Studios
- Length: 35:23
- Label: ABC, Universal Music Australia
- Producer: Jan Skubiszewski

Dan Sultan chronology
Aviary Takes (2019)	Nali & Friends (2019)	Dan Sultan (2023)

Singles from Nali & Friends
- 1. "Nali" Released: 19 March 2019; 2. "Bwindi" Released: 5 April 2019

Nali & Friends is the sixth studio album and first children's music album by Australian musician Dan Sultan, released on 12 April 2019. While this is Sultan's first children's album, he has previously collaborated with children's music icons The Wiggles and Play School.

At the ARIA Music Awards of 2019, the album won the ARIA Award for Best Children's Album.

== Background and release ==
The album's narrative arc follows the journey of hero character Nali, a baby Arctic bird with a crooked wing, who loses her way flying from the North to the South Pole. Along the way she meets different animals from all around the world, from the jungles of Uganda to the highlands of Borneo and the deserts of Australia. The album was co-written with long-time friend and collaborator, filmmaker Rhys Graham, and the stories were inspired by the pair's journey through Uganda and Kenya working with The Thin Green Line Foundation – an international organisation that provides welfare and support to Wildlife Rangers. It was during this trip that Sultan and Graham had the opportunity to get up close with baby animals and observe their quirky personalities.

In a statement, Sultan said "It was one of the most rewarding musical experiences I've had to date. I like a lot of different types of music, and what was really refreshing for me was this opportunity to dip into so many musical styles, to represent the various characters' stories. There's everything from calypso to flat out honky-tonk to cinematic ballads with strings Artistically it was very fulfilling."

== Production ==
The album was produced and engineered by Jan Skubiszewski at Red Moon Studios in the Macedon Ranges, Victoria.

== Singles ==
On 19 March, Sultan released "Nali" as the album's lead single. The song tells the tale of an Artic tern (Nali), who loses her way flying from the North to the South Pole, meeting animals friends from all around the world along the way.

On 5 April, "Bwindi" was released as the album's second single.

== Track listing ==
No.	Title	Length
1.	"The Crooked Wing"	1:40
2.	"Nali"	1:56
3.	"The Green Ocean"	1:26
4.	"Bwindi"	2:08
5.	"The Strong Wind"	1:54
6.	"Tembo"	1:59
7.	"The Wide Blue Ocean"	0:54
8.	"Bobby"	2:01
9.	"The Rain Tree"	1:01
10.	"Camilo the Armadillo"	1:41
11.	"The Misty Mountains"	1:18
12.	"Ya Ya"	1:37
13.	"A Tropical Storm"	1:38
14.	"Putu"	2:25
15.	"The Great Red Land"	1:08
16.	"Gulamana"	1:51
17.	"The Tall Forests"	1:36
18.	"Koomba"	2:01
19.	"The Southern Seas"	1:27
20.	"Macca"	1:39
21.	"The Frozen Land"	1:08
22.	"Nali" (reprise)	0:55

== Charts ==
Chart (2019)	Peak position
Australian Albums (ARIA)	157
Australian Digital Albums (ARIA)	22

== Release history ==
Country	Date	Format	Label	Catalogue
Australia	12 April 2019	Digital download, CD, streaming	ABC, Universal Music Australia	7737149

== See also ==
- The Thin Green Line
