= National Indigenous Music Awards 2024 =

Edition of Australian music awards

- Date: 10 August 2024
- Venue: Darwin Amphitheatre, Northern Territory, Australia

Highlights
- Most wins: Barkaa (2
- Most nominations: The Kid LAROI, Barkaa (3)
- Website: nima.musicnt.com.au

Television/radio coverage
- Network: NITV and SBS On Demand

The National Indigenous Music Awards 2024 are the 21st annual National Indigenous Music Awards (NIMAs), which took place on 10 August 2024. Nominations were announced on 19 July 2024.

== Performers ==
Performers at the event were:

- Jessica Mauboy
- 3%
- Dan Sultan
- Miss Kaninna
- Emily Wurramara
- Birdz and Fred Leone
- Jamahl Yami
- Arrkula Yinbayarra (Shellie Morris and Eleanor Dixon Trio.) - "All Together We Sing"

== Hall of Fame inductee ==
- Sammy Butcher

== Triple J Unearthed National Indigenous Winner ==
- Jamahl Yami

== Awards ==
The nominations were revealed on 19 July 2024. Winners indicated in boldface, with other nominees in plain.

Artist of the Year

Artist	Result
3%	Nominated
**Barkaa**	Won
Budjerah	Nominated
Electric Fields	Nominated
Emma Donovan	Nominated
King Stingray	Nominated

New Talent of the Year

Artist	Result
Andrew Gurruwiwi Band	Nominated
**Becca Hatch**	Won
Jada Weazel	Nominated
James Range Band	Nominated
South Summit	Nominated

Album of the Year

Artist and album	Result
**Dan Sultan – Dan Sultan**	Won
Emma Donovan – Til My Song Is Done	Nominated
Jessica Mauboy – Yours Forever	Nominated
The Kid Laroi – The First Time	Nominated
Troy Cassar-Daley – Between the Fires	Nominated

Film Clip of the Year

Artist and song	Result
Andrew Gurruwiwi Band – "Yaa Djamarrkuli"	Nominated
**Barkaa – "We Up"**	Won
Emily Wurramara – "Magic Woman Dancing"	Nominated
Rona. – "Aperleye"	Nominated
The Kid Laroi – "Bleed"	Nominated

Song of the Year

Artist and song	Result
**3% – "Our People"**	Won
Barkaa – "We Up"	Nominated
Budjerah – "Video Game"	Nominated
Christine Anu – "Waku - Minaral a Minalay"	Nominated
Electric Fields - "One Milkali (One Blood)"	Nominated
The Kid Laroi - "Bleed"	Nominated

Community Clip of the Year

Artist and song	Result
Broome Youth and Families Hub – "BME YOUNGNZ"	Nominated
Bulman School & Community – "Malnganarra"	Nominated
**Bulman School & Community - "Nidjarra"**	Won
Cabbo Crew & Desert Pea Media - "Wanna Go Home"	Nominated
Miihi Mirri-Dha & Desert Pea Media - "'Diamond in the Rough"	Nominated
The Hill & Desert Pea Media - "Butterfly"	Nominated

Indigenous Language Award

Artist and song	Result
Electric Fields - "Anpuru Maau Kutjpa"	Won
Rrawun Maymuru - "Yolngu"	Won
