= Organic (Arj Barker album) =

Live album by Arj Barker
- Released: 29 July 2019
- Venue: Powerhouse, Brisbane, Australia
- Genre: Comedy
- Label: A List Entertainment

Arj Barker chronology
Heavy (2013)	Organic (2019)

Organic is a live DVD and album by comedian Arj Barker. The DVD was released in November 2018 and the album was released in July 2019.

At the ARIA Music Awards of 2019 it won the ARIA Award for Best Comedy Release.

== Track listing ==
1. "Intro Trump" – 2:01
2. "Out of Control Children" – 1:43
3. "Uber vs Taxis" – 6:09
4. "Shit Sayings" – 3:19
5. "Airline Safety" – 3:39
6. "Brisvegas" – 3:09
7. "King Hit" – 3:39
8. "Getting Married" – 3:22
9. "Wife's Laugh" – 2:35
10. "Gluten Free" – 4:27
11. "Caveman & Bread" – 5:35
12. "Caveman Sandwich" – 2:46
13. "Organic Fruit" – 1:45
14. "Spoilers" – 5:36
15. "Handwriting & Loveletter" – 5:08
16. "Marriage Code" – 5:26
17. "The Circus" – 3:44
18. "Organic Song Intro" – 1:40
19. "Organic" – 7:12

== Release history ==
Region	Date	Format	Label	Catalogue
Australia	14 November 2018	DVD	Universal / Sony Pictures	D1027
Australia	29 July 2019	digital download	A-List Entertainment	
