= Get Out While You Can =

Studio album by Dan Sultan
- Released: 6 November 2009
- Recorded: Eastern Bloc Studios, Melbourne
- Genre: Blues and roots, rock, country, soul
- Length: 44:08
- Label: Dan Sultan
- Producer: Dan Sultan; Scott Wilson

Dan Sultan chronology
Homemade Biscuits (2006)	Get Out While You Can (2009)	Blackbird (2014)

Get Out While You Can is the second studio album by Australian musician Dan Sultan, released in November 2009.

At the ARIA Music Awards of 2010, Sultan won two awards; Best Male Artist and Best Blues and Roots Album.

== Track listing ==
No.	Title	Writer(s)	Length
1.	"Goddess Love"	Scott Wilson	4:18
2.	"Sorrowbound"	Dan Sultan; Wilson	3:12
3.	"Dingo"	Wilson	3:02
4.	"Never Let You Down"	Wilson	4:48
5.	"Old Fitzroy"	Sultan; Wilson	3:22
6.	"Get Out While You Can"	Wilson	3:54
7.	"Walk Through My Dream"	Sultan	3:48
8.	"Crazy"	Sultan; Wilson	3:34
9.	"Letter"	Sultan; Wilson	3:10
10.	"Fear of Flying"	Wilson	3:46
11.	"I Like It"	Wilson	2:13
12.	"Come Home Tonight"	Sultan; Wilson	3:10
13.	"Cadillac and a Mustang"	Wilson	3:51

== Charts ==
Chart performance for Get Out While You Can
Chart (2009)	Peak position
Australian Albums (ARIA)	90

== Release history ==
Country	Date	Format	Label	Catalogue
Australia	6 November 2009	Digital download, CD,	Dan Sultan	SUL002
