= Dirty Ground =

EP by Dan Sultan
- Released: 7 November 2014
- Length: 21:51
- Label: Liberation
- Producer: Jan Skubiszewski

Dan Sultan chronology
Blackbird (2014)	Dirty Ground (2014)	Open Live (2015)

Singles from Dirty Ground
- 1. "Dirty Ground" Released: October 2014

Dirty Ground is the first extended play by Australian musician Dan Sultan, released in November 2014. The EP was recorded in one day and features new songs, quieter moments and B-sides from Sultan's latest studio album, Blackbird.

Sultan promoted the EP with live tour across Australia in November 2014. Further dates were added in February, March and April 2015.

== Reception ==
Professional ratings
Review scores
Source	Rating
Speaker TV	7/10 stars

Lauren Mitchell from Speaker TV said "Rousing and raw, Dan Sultan's latest delivery exudes his affinity for stripped back and simply beautiful songs." adding "The EP oozes with a steadfastly soothing Australian sound, leaving an uncanny simplicity to shine through... The striking nature of this EP not only showcases Sultan's versatility as a songwriter and musician, but also further solidifies his ability to glide seamlessly from band member to solo performer."

Ali Birnie said "Drawing you in from the very first note, Dirty Ground is a breathtaking collection of acoustic tunes." adding "All the tracks on this EP are similar, however this matters little as they are incredibly captivating. Sultan’s gentle guitar work perfectly complements his soulful voice."

== Track listing ==
No.	Title	Writer(s)	Length
1.	"Dirty Ground"	Dan Sultan; Paul Kelly	3:55
2.	"Mountaintop"	Sultan; Paul Dempsey	3:01
3.	"Man on TV"	Sultan	4:24
4.	"On the Leffy"	Sultan; Kelly	3:04
5.	"The Same Man" (acoustic)	Sultan; Pip Norman	3:23
6.	"Gullible Few"	Sultan; Alexander Burnett	3:53

== Charts ==
Chart (2014)	Peak position
Australian Albums Chart (ARIA)	66

== Release history ==
Country	Date	Format	Label	Catalogue
Australia	7 November 2014	Digital download, CD	Liberation Records	LMCD0266
