= Dan Sultan (album) =

Studio album by Dan Sultan
- Released: 18 August 2023
- Studios: Oceanic (Brookvale); Fall Back (Melbourne); The Grove (Somersby)
- Length: 40:49
- Label: Liberation
- Producers: Dan Sultan; Joel Quartermain

Dan Sultan chronology
| Nali & Friends (2019) | Dan Sultan (2023) | Live at Tubowgule (Sydney Opera House) (2026) |

Singles from Dan Sultan
- 1. "Story" Released: 24 February 2023; 2. "Won't Give You That" Released: 24 March 2023; 3. "Wait Love" Released: 5 May 2023; 4. "Ringing in My Ears" Released: 7 July 2023; 5. "Fortress" Released: 4 August 2023

Dan Sultan is the seventh studio album by Australian musician Dan Sultan, released on 18 August 2023. The album was announced on 4 May 2023, alongside the album's third single.

In a statement, Sultan said "Until now I've shied away from having a photo of my face on any artwork and I've now gone completely the other way with this record. It's symbolic of just how raw and straight the work is in content albeit extremely polished from a production and writing standpoint". Sultan continued, "I've never been as good as I've been while writing and making this record. I'm very proud of my record and I know that I've made a beautiful thing that represents myself in all ways. It has fulfilled me and I'm happier and stronger in my work than I've ever been. It's a wonderful thing to feel so peaceful and powerful within my artistry and it's holistically permeated into every aspect of my life."

The album will be supported by the Dan Sultan East Coast Tour, commencing on 30 September 2023 in Brisbane.

At the 2023 ARIA Music Awards, the album was nominated for Best Solo Artist, Best Independent Release and Best Adult Contemporary Album.

At the AIR Awards of 2024, the album won Best Independent Blues and Roots Album or EP. The album won Album of the Year at the National Indigenous Music Awards 2024.

== Reception ==
Bryget Chrisfield from The Music said "[the album] covers a lot of ground, both sonically and thematically [and] also finds him more at peace and in career-best form."

== Track listing ==
Dan Sultan track listing
| No. | Title | Writer(s) | Length |
|---|---|---|---|
| 1. | "Story" | Dan Sultan; Joel Quartermain | 2:55 |
| 2. | "Won't Give You That" | Sultan; Quartermain | 3:55 |
| 3. | "Wait in Love" | Sultan; Quartermain | 3:42 |
| 4. | "Ringing in My Ears" | Sultan; Chris Collins; Quartermain | 3:27 |
| 5. | "Fortress" (featuring Julia Stone) | Sultan; Quartermain; Julia Stone | 3:47 |
| 6. | "Chance to Lose Control" | Sultan; Quartermain | 3:36 |
| 7. | "Rise Up" | Sultan; Quartermain | 3:10 |
| 8. | "Saint Nor Sinner" | Sultan; Quartermain; Steve Veale | 4:03 |
| 9. | "Boats" | Sultan; Chris Emerson; Quartermain | 4:15 |
| 10. | "Undreamt Shores" | Sultan; Collins | 4:32 |
| 11. | "Lashings" | Sultan | 3:27 |
| Total length: | | | 40:49 |

== Personnel ==
- Dan Sultan – vocals, production
- Joel Quartermain – production
- Leon Zervos – mastering
- Scott Horscroft – mixing

== Charts ==
Chart performance for Dan Sultan
| Chart (2023) | Peak position |
|---|---|
| Australian Albums (ARIA) | 15 |

== Release history ==
Release history and formats for Dan Sultan
| Country | Date | Format | Label | Catalogue |
|---|---|---|---|---|
| Australia | 18 August 2023 | Digital download; streaming; CD; LP | Liberation | LRCD0040/ LRLP0040 |
