= Arj Barker =

American actor and comedian (born 1974)

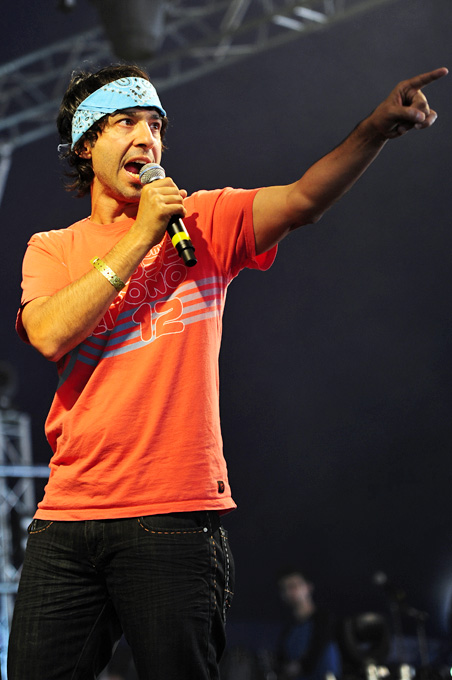
- Born: Arjan Singh Aulakh; August 12, 1974 (age 52); San Francisco, United States
- Notable work: Dave on Flight of the Conchords
- Spouse(s): Whitney Barker, née King

Comedy career
- Years active: 1989–present
- Medium: Stand-up, television
- Genres: Observational, satire
- Website: www.arjbarker.com

Arjan Singh Āulakh (born August 12, 1974), known by the stage name Arj Barker, is an Australian American comedian and actor from San Anselmo, California. He has toured in North America, Australia, New Zealand and Europe. He was born to an engineer father and artist mother. His father is of Indian Punjabi Sikh descent and his mother is of European descent.

== Career ==
From an early age, I was trying to get laughs, but it wasn't a conscious thing. I think I was about six months old when I first realized I needed friends in life and making people laugh worked for me. By nine months, I came out of my shell.

— Daily Telegraph, 30 June 2012

Barker started his career in comedy after graduating from high school in 1989. His first gigs were at a café called Caffe Nuvo in downtown San Anselmo where he hosted stand-up night every Sunday throughout the early 1990s. Barker appeared on Premium Blend in 1997, followed by appearances on the shows Late Night with Conan O'Brien and The Glass House. He twice hosted Comedy Central Presents, first on September 20, 2000, and again on March 31, 2006. Barker was featured in Comedy Central's animated series Shorties Watchin' Shorties. He appeared on the Australian show Thank God You're Here on October 18, 2006, September 19, 2007, and June 17, 2009.

Barker co-wrote and performed in The Marijuana-Logues, an Off-Broadway show in New York City, with Doug Benson and Tony Camin. The title of the show was a parody of The Vagina Monologues. NBC gave Barker the lead role for sitcom Nearly Nirvana, originally scheduled for 2004. However, Barker was replaced in the lead role by the show's creator, Ajay Sahgal, and the show never aired.

Barker appeared in the HBO sitcom Flight of the Conchords, playing Dave. Barker has been successful in Australia for a number of years since first appearing at the Melbourne International Comedy Festival in 2000, and presently resides there. At the ARIA Music Awards of 2019, he won Best Comedy Release for Organic.

== Arj and Poopy ==
Barker also has his own Flash series, Arj and Poopy, based on some of his stand-up material, that stars him and his cat, Poopy, who talks by farting. The series was animated by Bernard Derriman, and has been syndicated to AtomFilms.

The episode "Unlucky in Love" won the Annecy International Animated Film Festival Internet Selection in 2006.

=== List of episodes ===
1. "Experimentation"
2. "Venetian Rowing Machine"
3. "Philosopher"
4. "Brutally Ambushed"
5. "Long Distance Relationship"
6. "Shpants"
7. "Unlucky in Love"
8. "Yoga"
9. "Oh, Christmas tree"
10. "Congo Windfall"
11. "Poetreet"

== Last Comic Standing ==
Barker was featured as a contestant on the first episode of the fifth season of Last Comic Standing, where he advanced to the Los Angeles semi-final round. He then failed to progress to the final 10 in the semi-final round.

== Controversy ==
During the 2024 Melbourne International Comedy Festival, Barker attracted widespread media attention in Australia for, while on stage at a show strictly for audiences 15+, asking a mother, Trish Faranda, and her 7-month-old baby to leave and have her ticket refunded. Faranda, who said the request was "humiliating", claimed she had been breastfeeding her baby at the time, and that the baby “gurgled a little bit, equivalent to someone coughing”. Barker stated he was not aware that she was breastfeeding, and simply requested she exit the venue as the baby was making a noise and interrupting the show for other audience members, as well as affecting his train of thought.

== Discography ==
=== Albums ===
Name	Album details
Arj Barker: Issue Were Here	Released: 1999; Label: Art Baker (ARJ001); Format: CD
The Marijuana-Logues (with Doug Benson & Tony Camin)	Released: 2004; Label: Comedy Central Records (CCR0028); Format: CD
Live	Released: October 2006; Label: A-List Entertainment; Format: Digital Download
Forever	Released: October 2009; Label: A-List Entertainment; Format: Digital Download
Arj Barker: LYAO	Released: 2010; Label: A-List Entertainment; Format: CD+DVD
Joy Harvest	Released: 9 October 2012; Label: A-List Entertainment; Format: Digital Download
Heavy	Released: 8 October 2013; Label: A-List Entertainment; Format: Digital Download
Organic	Released: 29 July 2019; Label: A-List Entertainment; Format: Digital Download

=== DVD releases ===
Name	Year
Live	2006
Balls	2008
Forever	2010
LYAO	2010
Joy Harvest	2012
Heavy	2013
Go Time	2015
Get in My Head	2017
Organic	2018

== Awards ==
=== ARIA Music Awards ===
The ARIA Music Awards is an annual awards ceremony that recognises excellence, innovation, and achievement across all genres of Australian music. Barker has won one award from four nominations.

Year	Nominee / work	Award	Result	Ref.
2010	Arj Barker Forever	Best Comedy Release	Nominated	
2012	Joy Harvest	Best Comedy Release	Nominated	
2017	Get In My Head	Best Comedy Release	Nominated	
2019	Organic	Best Comedy Release	Won	
