= Homemade Biscuits =

Studio album by Dan Sultan
- Released: 13 March 2006
- Genre: Blues and roots, rock, country, soul
- Length: 46:25
- Label: Dan Sultan
- Producer: Dan Sultan; Scott Wilson

Dan Sultan chronology
Homemade Biscuits (2006)	Get Out While You Can (2009)

Homemade Biscuits is the debut studio album by Australian singer Dan Sultan, released in March 2006. The album was produced with the help of funding from the John Butler's Seed program.

== Reception ==
WaterFront Records said "Dan Sultan has emerged as one of this country's great male vocalists with multi instrumental skills and great songwriting. Scott Wilson is one of the great guitar players and an equally great songwriter, producer and session muso. Dan and Scott worked together in 2005 to produce an amazing album under Dan's name called Homemade Biscuits - an absolute treat with a cool style of country soul edged songs with strong vocal harmonies and great playing."

== Track listing ==
No.	Title	Writer(s)	Length
1.	"Your Love Is Like a Song"	Dan Sultan; Scott Wilson	4:24
2.	"Enemy"	Wilson	4:34
3.	"Forever"	Wilson	5:03
4.	"Caroline"	Sultan; Wilson	4:57
5.	"The Door Is Still Open to My Heart"	Chuck Willis	3:39
6.	"Miss Linda"	Wilson	4:54
7.	"Whip On Hide"	Sultan; Wilson	4:07
8.	"Fool"	Wilson	3:57
9.	"Lonesome Tears"	Sultan	3:02
10.	"Money"	Wilson	2:50
11.	"Voices"	Sultan; Wilson	4:55
12.	"Roslyn"	Wilson	2:43

== Release history ==
Country	Date	Format	Label	Catalogue
Australia	13 March 2006	Digital download, CD,	Dan Sultan	SUL001
