= Melbourne Ska Orchestra =

Australian band

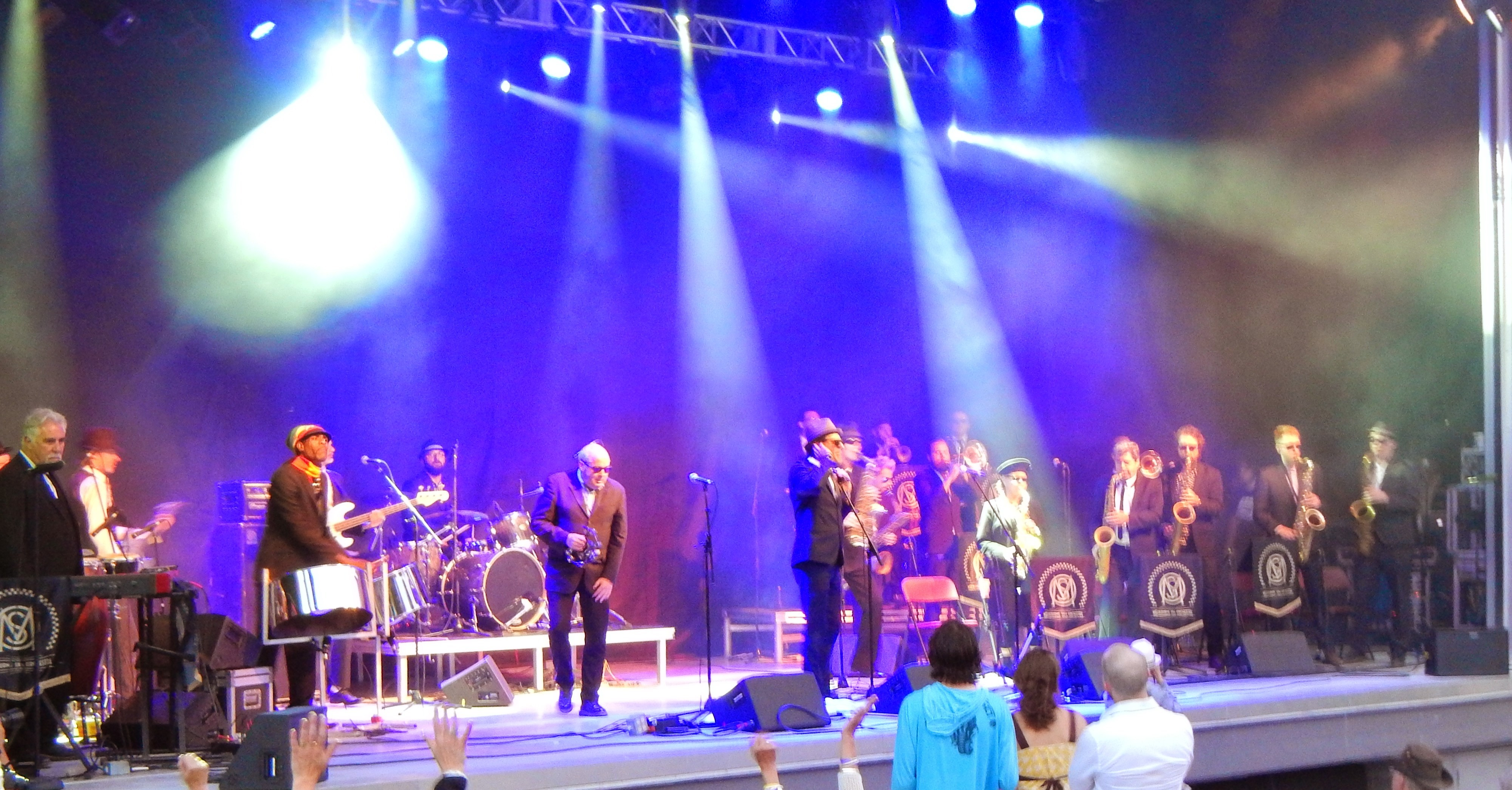
- Melbourne Ska Orchestra performing at Northern Lights Festival Boréal in 2014

Background information
- Origin: Melbourne, Victoria, Australia
- Genres: Ska, big band, reggae
- Years active: 2003-present
- Label: FOUR FOUR
- Website: melbourneskaorchestra.com

Melbourne Ska Orchestra are an ARIA Award-winning Australian ska band formed in 2003 in Melbourne. The group has up to 34 members, and is led by bandleader Nicky Bomba, formerly of the John Butler Trio. The band are signed to FOUR FOUR, an imprint of ABC Music.

== Background ==
The Melbourne Ska Orchestra was created by musician Nicky Bomba and radio presenter Mohair Slim. The band's inaugural performance was on 31 May 2003 to a sold out crowd at The Esplanade Hotel's Gershwin Room, in St Kilda.

The eponymous Melbourne Ska Orchestra album was released to rave reviews in 2013 and picked up two ARIA nominations that year.

The band have toured extensively, including festival appearances at Bluesfest, Golden Plains, Vivid, Caloundra, Queenscliff, and AWME. In addition to touring in Australia, the band has built an overseas fan base. The band sold out their debut London show, appeared on the bill for the Glastonbury Festival and played a headline set to a crowd 50,000 at the Montreal Jazz Festival during their 2014 tour. The band has performed in Australia, New Zealand, United Kingdom, USA, Canada, and Turkey, and has appeared in television commercials in Australia and Japan.

The band released their second album Sierra Kilo Alpha in April 2016, embarking on a national tour to support it. Sierra Kilo Alpha won the 2016 ARIA Award for Best World Music Album. The band released a follow-up called Saturn Return in late 2016. Saturn Return comprises a selection of songs from the same recording session as Sierra Kilo Alpha and was released on a rocket-shaped USB drive.

In 2018, the band announced that they would release one song every week (each Friday, hence "52 Fridays") for an entire year. At the end of 2019, the entire 52-week series of single releases was successfully concluded with the song "Magnolia Springtime". The resulting collection, One Year of Ska, won the ARIA Award for Best World Music Album in 2019.

The band draws inspiration from many elements of the ska genre, from the Jamaican movement through to UK Two Tone, as well as present day Latino Ska.

They are signed to FOUR FOUR, an imprint of ABC Music.

== Members ==
Members of the band include:

- Nicky Bomba
- Barry Deenick
- Rodrigo Pino
- Dorian West
- Antonio Milillo
- Michael Caruana
- Michael Havir
- Stephen Phillips
- George Servanis
- Dave Joseph
- Elvis Aljus
- Lennox Jordan
- Steven Montgomery
- Pat Powell
- Paul Coyle
- Patrick Cronin
- David Henry
- Sarah Heffernan
- Theodore Kazan
- Dean Hilson
- Justin Forster
- Robert Calvert
- Peter Mitchell
- Laurance Bongailas
- Anthony Hicks
- Sally Ford
- Peter Slipper
- Kynan Robinson
- Wally Maloney
- Michael Boase
- Jake Savona
- Cam Hassard
- Piers Gooding
- Russell Roberts
- Stuart Ferguson
- Ed Farrar
- Dan Kerr
- Jessica Jacobs
- Anna Gordon

Mohair Slim was previously a member of the band.

== Discography ==
=== Studio albums ===
Title	Details
Melbourne Ska Orchestra	Released: 2013; Label: Four Four (3729304); Format: CD, 2xLP, digital download
Sierra Kilo Alpha	Released: April 2016; Label: Four Four (4736063); Format: CD, LP, digital download
Saturn Return	Released: 2016; Label: Melbourne Ska Orchestra; Format: USB digital download; Unreleased recordings from the Sierra Kilo Alpha sessions
Ska Classics	Released: May 2018; Label: ABC Music; Format: digital download
TV & Movie Themes	Released: July 2018; Label: ABC Music; Format: digital download
Read All About It!	Released: October 2018; Label: ABC Music; Format: digital download
Transmission Fridays	Released: March 2019; Label: ABC Music; Format: digital download
The Ballad of Monte Loco	Released: June 2025; Label: ABC Music; Format: CD, LP, digital download
Monte Loco Rides Again	Released: August 2026; Label: ABC Music; Format: CD, LP, digital download

=== Live albums ===
Title	Details
Live at The Triffid	Released: May 2020; Label: Melbourne Ska Orchestra, ABC Music; Format: digital download

=== Compilation albums ===
Title	Details
One Year of Ska	Released: 2019; Label: Four Four Music (7762177); Format: 4xCD, digital download
20 Years Young	Released: 10 March 2023; Label: Four Four Music (FOUR0005); Format: CD, digital download

== Awards and nominations ==
=== AIR Awards ===
The Australian Independent Record Awards (commonly known informally as AIR Awards) is an annual awards night to recognise, promote and celebrate the success of Australia's Independent Music sector.

Year	Nominee / work	Award	Result	Ref.
2026	The Ballad of Monte Loco	Best Independent Blues and Roots Album or EP	Nominated	

=== ARIA Awards ===
Melbourne Ska Orchestra won Best World Music Album in 2016 and 2019.

Year	Nominee / work	Award	Result
2013	Nicky Bomba and Robin Mai - Melbourne Ska Orchestra	Engineer of the Year	Nominated
2013	Melbourne Ska Orchestra	Best Blues & Roots Album	Nominated
2014	The Diplomat Tour	Best Australian Live Act	Nominated
2016	Sierra Kilo Alpha	Best World Music Album	Won
2017	Saturn Return	Best World Music Album	Nominated
2018	Ska Classics	Best World Music Album	Nominated
2019	One Year of Ska	Best World Music Album	Won
2020	Live at the Triffid	Best World Music Album	Nominated
2026	Monte Loco Rides Again	Best World Music Album	Nominated

=== Music Victoria Awards ===
The Music Victoria Awards are an annual awards night celebrating Victorian music. They commenced in 2006.

Year	Nominee / work	Award	Result	Ref.
2013	Melbourne Ska Orchestra	Best Global or Reggae Act	Won	
2016	Melbourne Ska Orchestra	Best Global or Reggae Act	Won	
2018	Melbourne Ska Orchestra	Best Global or Reggae Act	Nominated	
2023	Melbourne Ska Orchestra	Best Reggae and Dancehall Work	Nominated	
2024	Melbourne Ska Orchestra	Best Reggae and Dancehall Work	Nominated	
