= Killer (Dan Sultan album) =

Studio album by Dan Sultan
- Released: 28 July 2017
- Studio: Eastern Bloc Studios, Melbourne
- Length: 39:00
- Label: Liberation
- Producer: Jan Skubiszewski; Pip Norman; Jon Hume

Dan Sultan chronology
Open Live (2015)	Killer (2017)	Killer Under a Blood Moon (2018)

Singles from Killer
- 1. "Magnetic" Released: 26 September 2016; 2. "Hold it Together" Released: 12 May 2017; 3. "Kingdom" Released: July 2017

Killer is the fourth studio album by Australian musician Dan Sultan, released in July 2017.

At the ARIA Music Awards of 2017, the album was nominated for three awards; Best Male Artist, Best Rock Album and Best Independent Album.

== Reception ==
ABC said "Killer is full of great songs. It gives more bang for buck than any Dan Sultan record so far, and the fact that it is an evolution in his sound is just a welcome bonus. Dan Sultan is still a rockstar on Killer, just one of a different kind. It suits him just fine."

Jake Cleland from Stack said "Killer delivers gospel and blues in a package of tight rock songs." adding "[the album] is poised to sweep up anyone not already on Sultan's soul train."

Josh Butler from Huffington Post said "[Sultan] set aside his trusty guitar for much of the record, instead moving toward synthesisers and electronic drums. The classic Sultan touches are still there, and this is still very much a blues record -- but it feels newer, more urgent and vital."

Paul Smith from Sydney Morning Herald said on Killer, "[Sultan] created an altogether more ambitious sound, with electronica, choirs and orchestral elements added to his gutsy, bluesy, gospel tone."

== Track listing ==
No.	Title	Writer(s)	Length
1.	"Drover"	Dan Sultan; Alex Burnett	3:10
2.	"Hold It Together"	Sultan; Burnett	3:21
3.	"Kingdom"	Sultan; Ben Abraham; Pip Norman	3:24
4.	"Killer"	Sultan; Joel Quartermain	3:19
5.	"Should've Known"	Sultan; Norman	3:31
6.	"Cul-de-sac"	Sultan; Julian Hamilton	4:30
7.	"Magnetic"	Sultan; Quartermain; Jan Skubiszewski	3:48
8.	"Over In Time"	Sultan; Jon Hume	3:37
9.	"Reaction"	Sultan; Burnett; Norman	3:20
10.	"Fire Under Foot"	Sultan; Hume	3:48
11.	"Easier Man"	Sultan; Skubiszewski	3:12

== Charts ==
Chart (2017)	Peak position
Australian Albums (ARIA)	5

== Release history ==
Country	Date	Format	Label	Catalogue
Australia	28 July 2017	Digital download, CD	Liberation	LMCD0331
