= 2019 ARIA Music Awards =

Australian recording industry awards

- Date: 27 November 2019
- Venue: Star Event Centre, Sydney, New South Wales
- Hosted by: Guy Sebastian

Highlights
- Most wins: Tones and I (4)
- Most nominations: Tones and I (8)
- Website: ariaawards.com.au

Television/radio coverage
- Network: Nine Network

The ARIA Music Awards of 2019 are the 33rd Annual Australian Recording Industry Association Music Awards (generally known as the ARIA Music Awards or simply the ARIAs) and consist of a series of awards, including the 2019 ARIA Artisan Awards, ARIA Hall of Fame Awards, and ARIA Fine Arts Awards and the ARIA Awards. The ARIA Awards ceremony were held on 27 November 2019 and broadcast from the Star Event Centre, Sydney around Australia on the Nine Network. Guy Sebastian hosted the ceremony, he also performed his track, "Choir", and won two categories.

On 24 September 2019 the Fine Arts and Artisan Award nominees were announced and the winners were determined on 10 October. ARIA had revealed the nominees for the ARIA Awards on 10 October. New categories were created for Best Hip Hop Release and Best Soul/R&B Release, which had previously been combined as Best Urban Release.

Australian four-piece vocal group Human Nature were inducted into the ARIA Hall of Fame. They performed a medley of their songs, "Don't Say Goodbye", "He Don't Love You", "Dancing in the Street" and "Everytime You Cry". Tones and I won the most awards, receiving four from eight nominations. The Teskey Brothers received seven nominations and won three categories; while Hilltop Hoods, also with seven nominations, obtained one trophy. Michael Chugg, a promoter and talent manager, received the ARIA Industry Icon Award.

== Performers ==
2019 ARIA Hall of Fame inductee
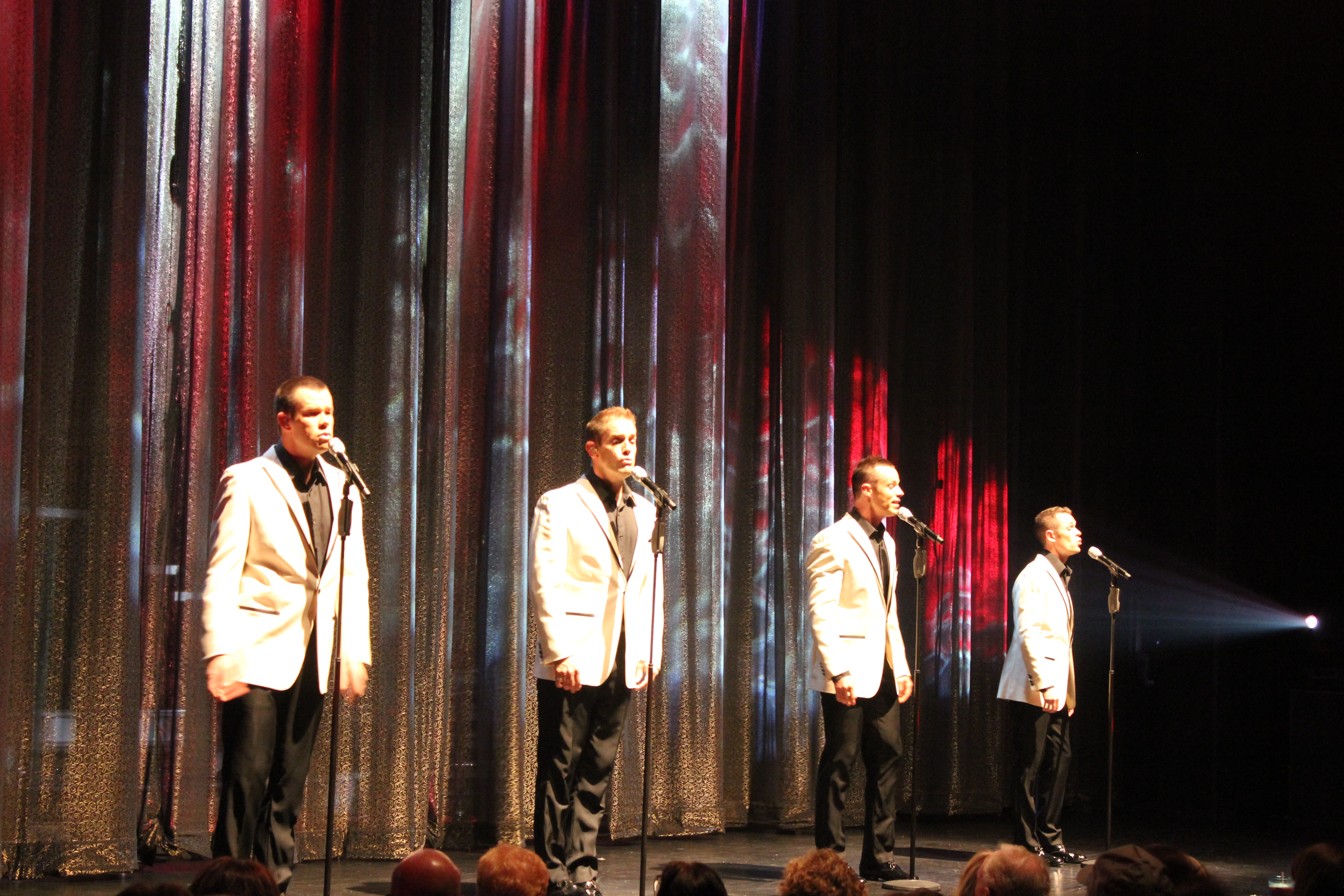
Human Nature, May 2012

Performers for the ARIA Awards ceremony:

Full list of performers
Artist(s)	Song(s)	Ref.
Halsey	"Graveyard"	
Dua Lipa	"Don't Start Now"	
Guy Sebastian	"Choir"	
Hilltop Hoods	"Exit Sign"	
Human Nature	Medley: "Don't Say Goodbye"; "He Don't Love You"; "Dancing in the Street"; "Everytime You Cry"	
The Teskey Brothers	"Rain"	
Thelma Plum	"Better in Blak"	
Tones and I	"Dance Monkey"	
Khalid	"Talk"	
Morgan Evans	"Day Drunk"	

== ARIA Hall of Fame inductee ==
On 1 November an ARIA representative announced that Human Nature were to be inducted into their Hall of Fame. The group's members issued a joint statement, "All we have ever wanted to do for a career is to entertain people, and to have had the fans continually support us over the years both in our home of Australia and overseas, is really something we never dreamed of. To be inducted on the anniversary of our first ever performance as a group and in our 30th year since forming makes us so grateful."

== Nominees and winners ==
=== ARIA Awards ===
Winners indicated in boldface, with other nominees in plain.

Album of the Year	Best Group
**Dean Lewis – A Place We Knew**; Hilltop Hoods – The Great Expanse; Rüfüs Du Sol – Solace; The Teskey Brothers – Run Home Slow; Thelma Plum – Better in Blak	**The Teskey Brothers – Run Home Slow**; 5 Seconds of Summer – "Easier"; Birds of Tokyo – "Good Lord"; Hilltop Hoods – The Great Expanse; Rüfüs Du Sol – Solace
Best Male Artist	Best Female Artist
**Dean Lewis – A Place We Knew**; Guy Sebastian – "Choir"; Hayden James – Between Us; Matt Corby – Rainbow Valley; Paul Kelly – Nature	**Tones and I – "Dance Monkey"**; Amy Shark – "Mess Her Up"; Jessica Mauboy – "Little Things"; Julia Jacklin – Crushing; Thelma Plum – Better in Blak
Best Adult Contemporary Album	Best Soul/R&B Release
**Paul Kelly – Nature**; Julia Jacklin – Crushing; Samantha Jade – The Magic of Christmas; Seeker Lover Keeper – Wild Seeds; The Paper Kites – On the Corner Where You Live	**Kaiit** – "**Miss Shiney**"; Adrian Eagle – "AOK"; Genesis Owusu – "WUTD" + "Vultures"; Matt Corby – Rainbow Valley; Tash Sultana – "Can't Buy Happiness"
Best Hard Rock/Heavy Metal Album	Best Rock Album
**Northlane – Alien**; Clowns – Nature/Nurture; Dead Letter Circus – Dead Letter Circus; DZ Deathrays – Positive Rising: Part 1; King Gizzard & the Lizard Wizard – Infest the Rats' Nest	**Amyl and the Sniffers – Amyl and the Sniffers**; Holy Holy – My Own Pool of Light; Jimmy Barnes – My Criminal Record; Midnight Oil – Armistice Day: Live at the Domain, Sydney; Skegss – My Own Mess
Best Blues & Roots Album	Best Country Album
**The Teskey Brothers – Run Home Slow**; Dan Sultan – Aviary Takes; John Butler Trio – Home; King Gizzard & the Lizard Wizard – Fishing for Fishies; Paul Kelly – Live at Sydney Opera House	**Morgan Evans – Things That We Drink To**; Charlie Collins – Snowpine; Felicity Urquhart – Frozen Rabbit; Lee Kernaghan – Backroad Nation; Sara Storer – Raindance
Best Pop Release	Best Dance Release
**Tones and I – "Dance Monkey"**; Amy Shark – "Mess Her Up"; Dean Lewis – A Place We Knew; Guy Sebastian – "Choir"; Thelma Plum – Better in Blak	**Rüfüs Du Sol – Solace**; Dom Dolla – "Take It"; Fisher – "You Little Beauty"; Peking Duk and Jack River – "Sugar"; Pnau – "Solid Gold"
Breakthrough Artist	Best Independent Release
**Tones and I – "Dance Monkey"**; G Flip – About Us; Stella Donnelly – Beware of the Dogs; The Teskey Brothers – Run Home Slow; Thelma Plum – Better in Blak	**Tones and I – The Kids Are Coming**; Angie McMahon – Salt; G Flip – About Us; Julia Jacklin – Crushing; The Teskey Brothers – Run Home Slow
Best Children's Album	Best Comedy Release
**Dan Sultan – Nali & Friends**; Kamil Ellis and Ensemble Offspring – Classic Kids: Music for the Dreaming; Regurgitator's Pogogo Show – The Really Really Really Really Boring Album; The Beanies – Imagination Station; The Wiggles – Party Time!	**Arj Barker – Organic**; Carl Barron – Drinking with a Fork; Chris Lilley – Lunatics (Official Soundtrack); Sammy J – Symphony in J Minor; Veronica and Lewis – Sex Flex: A Rap Guide to Fornication
Best Hip Hop Release	Icon Award
**Sampa the Great – "Final Form"**; Baker Boy – "Cool as Hell"; Hilltop Hoods – The Great Expanse; Illy – Then What; Tkay Maidza – "Awake" (featuring JPEGMafia)	**Michael Chugg**

=== Public voted ===
Song of the Year	Best Video
**Guy Sebastian – "Choir"**; 5 Seconds of Summer – "Easier"; Amy Shark – "Mess Her Up"; Birds of Tokyo – "Good Lord"; Dean Lewis – "7 Minutes"; Hilltop Hoods – "Leave Me Lonely"; Kian – "Waiting"; Morgan Evans – "Day Drunk"; Ocean Alley – "Confidence"; Tones and I – "Dance Monkey"	**James Chappell for Guy Sebastian – "Choir"**; Benn Jae for Jessica Mauboy – "Little Things"; Claudia Sangiorgi Dalimore for Thelma Plum – "Better in Blak"; Clemens Habicht for Pnau – "Solid Gold"; Dylan River for Briggs (featuring Greg Holden) – "Life Is Incredible"; G Flip for G Flip – "Drink Too Much"; Gabriel Gasparinatos for Baker Boy – "Cool as Hell"; Liam Kelly & Nick Kozakis for Tones and I – "Dance Monkey"; Richard Coburn for Hilltop Hoods (featuring Illy and Ecca Vandal) – "Exit Sign"; Sanjay De Silva for Sampa the Great – "Final Form"
Best Australian Live Act	Best International Artist
**Hilltop Hoods – The Great Expanse World Tour**; Amy Shark – Amy Shark Australian Tour; Baker Boy – Cool as Hell Tour; Electric Fields – 2000 and Whatever Tour; Gang of Youths – Say Yes to Life Tour; Keith Urban – Graffiti U Tour 2019; King Gizzard & the Lizard Wizard – King Gizzard & the Lizard Wizard Australian Tour 2019; Midnight Oil – Midnight Oil; Peking Duk – Peking Duk's Biggest Tour Ever... So Far; The Teskey Brothers – The Teskey Brothers - Intimate Venue Tour	**Taylor Swift – Lover**; Ariana Grande – Thank U, Next; Billie Eilish – When We All Fall Asleep, Where Do We Go?; Ed Sheeran – No.6 Collaborations Project; George Ezra – Staying at Tamara's; Khalid – Free Spirit; Pink – Hurts 2B Human; Post Malone – Hollywood's Bleeding; Shawn Mendes – Shawn Mendes; Travis Scott – Astroworld
Music Teacher of the Year
**Antonio Chiappetta (St Andrews College, Marayong, NSW)**; Bel Skinner (North Regional TAFE, WA); Julie Rennick (Gunnedah Conservatorium, NSW); Lee Strickland (Narbethong State Special School, QLD)

=== Fine Arts Awards ===
Winners indicated in boldface, with other nominees in plain.

Best Classical Album
- **Paul Kelly, James Ledger – Thirteen Ways to Look at Birds**
  - Diana Doherty, Sydney Symphony Orchestra, Nigel Westlake, David Robertson, Synergy Vocals – Nigel Westlake: Spirit of the Wild / Steve Reich: The Desert Music
  - Genevieve Lacey – Soliloquy: Telemann Solo Fantasias
  - Grigoryan Brothers, Adelaide Symphony Orchestra, Benjamin Northey – Bach Concertos
  - Nicole Car, Australian Chamber Orchestra, Richard Tognetti – Heroines
Best Jazz Album
- **Kate Ceberano and Paul Grabowsky – Tryst**
  - Andrea Keller – Transients Vol.1
  - Angela Davis – Little Did They Know
  - Barney McAll – Zephyrix
  - Phil Slater – The Dark Pattern
Best World Music Album
- **Melbourne Ska Orchestra – One Year of Ska**
  - Chaika – Arrow
  - Joseph Tawadros – Betrayal of a Sacred Sunflower
  - Tara Tiba – Omid
  - Zela Margossian Quintet – Transition
Best Original Soundtrack or Musical Theatre Cast Album
- **Various Artists – The Recording Studio (Music from the TV Series)**
  - Burkhard Dallwitz – LOCUSTS: Original Motion Picture Soundtrack
  - Gang of Youths – MTV Unplugged (Live in Melbourne)
  - Luke Howard – The Sand That Ate the Sea
  - Trials – Cargo

=== Artisan Awards ===
Winners indicated in boldface, with other nominees in plain.

Producer of the Year
- **Dann Hume for Matt Corby – Rainbow Valley**
  - Burke Reid for Julia Jacklin – Crushing
  - Kevin Parker for Tame Impala – "Patience"
  - Konstantin Kersting for Tones and I – "Dance Monkey"
  - Paul Kelly and Steven Schram for Paul Kelly – Nature
Engineer of the Year
- **Sam Teskey for The Teskey Brothers – Run Home Slow**
  - Burke Reid for Julia Jacklin – Crushing
  - Kevin Parker for Tame Impala – "Patience"
  - Konstantin Kersting for Tones and I – "Dance Monkey"
  - Plutonic Lab for Hilltop Hoods – The Great Expanse
Best Cover Art
- **Emilie Pfitzner for Thelma Plum – Better in Blak**
  - Ben Jones for Amyl and the Sniffers – Amyl and the Sniffers
  - Jonathan Zawada for Flume – Hi This Is Flume
  - Lucy Dyson for Paul Kelly – Nature
  - Nick Mckk for Julia Jacklin – Crushing
