= Sierra Kilo Alpha =

Studio album by Melbourne Ska Orchestra
- Released: April 2016
- Recorded: mid-2015
- Studio: ABC and Freeburgh studios, Melbourne
- Label: Four Four Music, UMA

Melbourne Ska Orchestra chronology
Melbourne Ska Orchestra (2013)	Sierra Kilo Alpha (2016)	Saturn Return (2016)

Sierra Kilo Alpha is the second studio album by the Australian ska band Melbourne Ska Orchestra. The album was released in April 2016.

At the ARIA Music Awards 2016, the album won the ARIA Award for Best World Music Album.

== Reception ==
Adam Norris from Beat Magazine said, "I kid you not, from the moment the needle drops on the M.S.O's sophomore record, you're up and running. Frontman Nicky Bomba is a seasoned hand at crafting a catchy tune, and his encyclopaedic enthusiasm is infectious. To hear him discuss the raucous ramblings of the band is enough to convince you to throw away your daily life, grab a horn and join the adventure."

Amazon Stores said, "Sierra Kilo Alpha throbs with hope, excitement and freshness."

== Track listing ==
1. "Escher"
2. "Sans Humanite"
3. "Funkchunk!"
4. "Bombay Detective"
5. "Nothing in the Well"
6. "Sly Boots"
7. "Stay Low"
8. "Solitary Island Sway"
9. "Special Thing"
10. "Satellite"
11. "Vespa Ska"
