= Killer Under a Blood Moon =

EP by Dan Sultan
- Released: 18 May 2018
- Label: Liberation

Dan Sultan chronology
Killer (2017)	Killer Under a Blood Moon (2018)	Aviary Takes (2019)

Singles from Killer Under a Blood Moon
- 1. "Killer" Released: May 2018; 2. "Reaction" Released: May 2018

Killer Under a Blood Moon is the second extended play by Australian musician Dan Sultan. Released in May 2018, the EP sees Dan Sultan working with Australian musicians to recreate songs from his previous studio album Killer. The EP concludes with two glam-bent bonus tracks, both offcuts from Killer.

Sultan said the EP came together quite naturally. "I'm always writing new music. The idea to work with other artists and rebuild a couple tracks came up, which I found really interesting and exciting. I sent out some text messages and they all said yes. It's great to have new music out there."

In an interview with Canberra Times, Sultan said the artists he chose to work with on this EP are his favourite artists. He said he felt lucky that everyone was available and everyone was willing.

At the ARIA Music Awards of 2018, the album was nominated for two awards; Best Male Artist and Best Independent Album.

== Reception ==
Jai Price from Music Insight said: "Bursting at the seams with something for everyone, Dan Sultan's EP is like a party mix of lollies; you don't know what you'll pull out each time you reach in, but it has a high chance of being delicious".

== Track listing ==
No.	Title	Writer(s)	Length
1.	"Drover" (featuring Dave Le'Aupepe)	Dan Sultan; Alex Burnett	3:48
2.	"My Kingdom" (featuring A.B. Original)	Sultan; Ben Abraham; Pip Norman	4:13
3.	"Reaction" (featuring Meg Mac)	Sultan; Burnett; Norman	4:38
4.	"Killer" (featuring Camp Cope)	Sultan; Joel Quartermain	3:57
5.	"Pitchfork"	Sultan	3:20
6.	"Coming Back"	Sultan	3:38

== Charts ==
Chart (2018)	Peak position
Australian Albums (ARIA)	66

== Release history ==
Country	Date	Format	Label	Catalogue
Australia	18 May 2018	Streaming, digital download, CD	Liberation	LRCD0002
