= Clairy Browne & the Bangin' Rackettes =

Australian soul band

- Origin: Melbourne, Victoria, Australia
- Genres: Soul; rhythm and blues
- Years active: 2009–2015
- Label: Vanguard Records

Clairy Browne & the Bangin' Rackettes were a soul band from Melbourne, Australia, that formed in 2009.

The band was fronted by lead vocalist Clairy Browne and backed by Camilla McKewen, Loretta Miller and Ruby Jones (The Bangin' Rackettes) along with Peter Bee (guitar), Nick Martyn (drums), Darcy McNulty (saxophone), Jules Pascoe (bass), Gabriel Strangio (keyboards).

The band's debut album Baby Caught the Bus was released in Australia in 2011 and in the United States by Vanguard Records in 2013, and features the lead single "Love Letter".

== Baby Caught the Bus (2011–2013) ==
In November 2011, the band released their debut record, Baby Caught the Bus, in Australia. Recorded at Sound Park Studios in Melbourne with producer Steve Schram, the record moves through heart-wrenching, doo-wop wailing, drunken pianos, party hysteria and tough, hard hitting soul. The album received strong reviews from local and national press, going on to be crowned album of the year on ABC Radio National.

In July 2012, the album's lead single, "Love Letter", was featured in a television commercial for international beer brand Heineken. The ad, titled "The Switch", was shot in Prague in earlier in the same year and features an appearance from Browne performing her own stunt, dropping down on a mechanical rotating stage as the scene transforms from dive bar into an opulent night club. Airing heavily in the US, "The Switch" saw Baby Caught The Bus reach #66 in the US iTunes Album charts and #4 in the Billboard Heatseekers charts as an independent release.

In 2013, the band traveled to the United States to perform at the annual SXSW music conference in Austin, Texas, in conjunction with a 28-date tour around the country that saw them perform in venues that included House of Blues, Mercury Lounge in New York City, and The Troubadour in Los Angeles. They planned to tour the US again from October 2013 to December 2013.

Baby Caught the Bus also received an official release in the United States on 21 May 2013, with the band signing to independent label Vanguard Records.

In May 2013, the group won first place in the AAA category of the International Songwriting Contest for their song "Love Letter".

In 2013 the song "I'll Be Fine" was used as the theme for ABC's comedy drama Please Like Me.

== 2014-2015 ==
On 5 August 2014, the band's second EP Love Cliques was released. It features the tracks "Jenny", "No Fear", "Heart's Desire", and "Paper Thin".

The group disbanded in 2015.

== Members ==
Last lineup

- Clairanne Browne – lead vocals (2009 – 2015)
- Peter Bee – Guitar (2009 – 2015)
- Ruby Jones – backing vocals (2011 – 2015)
- Camilla McKewen – backing vocals (2009 – 2015)
- Loretta Miller – backing vocals (2011 – 2015)
- Jules Pascoe – Bass Guitar / Double Bass (2009 – 2015)
- Gabriel Strangio – Piano / Keyboard (2009 – 2015)

Former members

- Darcy McNulty – Baritone / Soprano Saxophone (2009 – 2014)
- Nick Martyn – Drums (2009 – 2014)
- Simone Page Jones – Backing vocals (2009-2011)
- Natalie Browne – Backing vocals (2009-2011)
- Matt Witney - Guitar (2009 - 2010)

== Discography ==
=== Studio albums ===
Title	Details	Peak chart positions	
Title	Details	AUS	US
Baby Caught the Bus	Released: 11 November 2011 (Australia) (Independent / Shock); 16 May 2012 (Japan) (P-Vine Records); 21 May 2013 (United States) Vanguard Records)	—	167

=== EPs ===
Title	Details
Clairy Browne	Released: 22 February 2011 (Independent)
Love Cliques	Released: 5 August 2014 (Vanguard Records)

=== Singles ===
A-side	B-side	Release date
"She Plays Up to You"	"Frankie"	31 May 2011 (independent)
"Love Letter"	"Whatta Man"	21 May 2012 (independent)

==== Split 7" singles ====
A-side	B-side	Details
"Walk of Shame" (Clairy Browe & The Bangin' Rackettes)	"Second Best" (Saskwatch)	Released: 1 Jan 2013 (Northside Records)

== Awards and nominations ==
Year	Award-giving body	Category	Result
2011	ABC Radio National	Album of the Year	Won
2012	International Song Writing Competition	Song of the Year AAA Category	Won
2012	EG Awards	EG Awards - Best Band	Nominated
2013	APRA Music Awards	Blues & Roots Work of the Year	Nominated
2013	Music Victoria Awards	Best Band	Nominated
2013	Music Victoria Awards	Best Live Band	Nominated
2013	Cannes Lions	Film Craft: Best Use of Music	Nominated
