= Seven Sonnets & a Song =

Studio album by Paul Kelly
- Released: 22 April 2016
- Recorded: May 2012; 14–15 October 2014; 7 September 2015; 7–11 December 2015; 4 February 2016
- Studios: Mawson Hall; the Shed; Woodstock; Sound Park
- Genres: Rock; folk; alt-country
- Length: 19:22
- Label: Gawdaggie/Universal
- Producers: Paul Kelly; Steven Schram; Dan Kelly; J Walker

Paul Kelly chronology
The Merri Soul Sessions (2014)	Seven Sonnets & a Song (2016)	Death's Dateless Night (2016)

Seven Sonnets & a Song is the twenty-first studio album by Australian musician, Paul Kelly, which was issued on 22 April 2016 on his own label, Gawdaggie Records, and distributed by Universal Music Australia. Kelly composed music for seven sonnets by William Shakespeare and a poem, "My True Love Hath My Heart", by Philip Sidney. The album debuted at No. 9 on the ARIA Albums Chart, becoming Kelly's fourth top 10. It was nominated for Best Adult Contemporary Album at the ARIA Music Awards of 2016.

== Background ==
Seven Sonnets & a Song is the twenty-first studio album by Australian musician, Paul Kelly, which was issued on 18 April 2016 on his own label, Gawdaggie Records, and distributed by Universal Music Australia. Kelly had developed the concept of putting Shakespeare's sonnets to music to celebrate the 400th anniversary of the bard's death. Kelly sings lead vocals on six of the album's seven tracks, while Vika Bull (of Vika and Linda) provides lead vocal on "My True Love Hath My Heart", which is based on a poem by Philip Sidney.

Kelly owns a three-volume edition of Complete Works of Shakespeare and explained "Just about anything you want to say, Shakespeare's said it already." Michael Dwyer of The Sydney Morning Herald quoted Kelly "No-one ever did themselves any favours putting their lyrics next to Shakespeare's." United States-Canadian singer-songwriter, Rufus Wainwright, independently undertook a similar project for his album, Take All My Loves: 9 Shakespeare Sonnets (April 2016). Kelly explained "[previously] my own songs came about through music first or making sounds with chords and melodies and trying to get words to fit those sounds. But a few years ago I was involved in a project with a classical composer where I was asked to put poems to music. That was Yeats, Les Murray, Emily Dickinson and a few others, and that turned this key for me."

The album was recorded over five sessions from May 2012 to February 2016, with Kelly co-producing with Steve Schram on six tracks, while "O Mistress Mine (Clown's Song from Twelfth Night)" was co-produced by Kelly with, his nephew, Dan Kelly and J Walker. Music videos were prepared for "Sonnet 73" (directed by Sunny Leunig), "Sonnet 18" (Lucy Dyson) and "My True Love Hath My Heart" (Andy Doherty).

== Reception ==
On the ARIA Albums Chart, Seven Sonnets & a Song debuted and peaked at No. 9 – it became Kelly's fourth top 10. Kelly's work received his seventh nomination for Best Adult Contemporary Album at the ARIA Music Awards of 2016. AllMusic's Mark Deming rated it as three-and-a-half stars out-of five and explained, "poetry can certainly be adapted to pop songs, and the veteran Australian singer/songwriter [Kelly] has brought us a surprising and effective example of the latter process in action... [he] puts plenty of spirit and soul into the performances... there's a bold, easygoing vigor to this music that seems respectful to both the source material and Kelly's musical instincts."

Rolling Stone Australia's Dan Lander gave it four stars out-of five and believes it as has "a strange chemistry" with "the opening strains of 'Sonnet 138' sound like nothing as much as a Paul Kelly song, lyrics and all. Later, 'Sonnet 18' repeats the trick, marrying the timeless struggles of Shakespeare’s love to that shadowy, earthy sound that Kelly has made his own. Elsewhere, 'Sonnets 44 & 45' come together in a haunting piano ballad, while 'Sonnet 60' builds to grandeur from Kelly's idiosyncratic semi-spoken style." He also states "that the only song that doesn't connect" is "My True Love Hath My Heart" which "falls flat amidst an otherwise uplifting album."

Steve Bell on TheMusic.com.au concludes "In lesser hands this could have all been tough going, but Kelly's clear love of Shakespeare meshed with his own unfettered musicality makes this yet another fascinating landmark in his ever-evolving canon." Wainwright opined "It sounds great in a convertible", Kelly responded "That's good. I make all my records to sound good in a convertible, especially."

== Track listing ==
All lyrics are written by William Shakespeare; all music is composed by Paul Kelly, unless otherwise indicated

No.	Title	Writer(s)	Length
1.	"Sonnet 138"		2:39
2.	"Sonnet 73"		1:53
3.	"Sonnet 18"		3:17
4.	"My True Love Hath My Heart"	Philip Sidney, Paul Kelly	2:44
5.	"Sonnets 44 & 45"		3:11
6.	"Sonnet 60"		3:25
7.	"O Mistress Mine"		2:06

== Personnel ==
Musicians

- Aaron Barden – violin
- Cameron Bruce – mellotron, organ, piano, vibraphone
- Linda Bull – backing vocals
- Vika Bull – backing vocals, lead vocals (track 4)
- Ross Irwin – string arrangements
- Charlotte Jacke – cello
- Alice Keath – banjo, backing vocals
- Dan Kelly – guitar, backing vocals
- Paul Kelly – acoustic guitar, lead vocals
- Peter Luscombe – drums, tambourine
- Bill McDonald – bass guitar, double bass
- Ashley Naylor – guitars (acoustic, electric)
- Lucky Oceans – pedal steel
- Greg J Walker – autoharp
- Leah Zweck – viola

Recording details

- John Castle – engineering, mixing
- Ross Cockle – mastering
- Dan Kelly – producer (track 7)
- Paul Kelly – producer
- Luke Mullan – assistant engineer
- Steven Schram – engineer, mixing, producer
- Richard Stoltz – engineer
- Greg J Walker – engineer, producer (track 7)

Artwork

- John Castle – photography
- Andy Doherty – photography
- Paul Kelly – liner notes
- Luke Mullan – photography
- Peter Salmon-Lomas – artwork

== Chart performance ==
Chart (2016)	Peak position
Australian Albums (ARIA)	9
