= Blackbird (Dan Sultan album) =

Studio album by Dan Sultan
- Released: 4 April 2014
- Recorded: Nashville
- Length: 48:00
- Label: Liberation Records
- Producer: Jacquire King

Dan Sultan chronology
Get Out While You Can (2009)	Blackbird (2014)	Dirty Ground (2014)

Singles from Blackbird
- 1. "Under Your Skin" Released: 15 November 2013; 2. "The Same Man" Released: 14 February 2014; 3. "Kimberley Calling" Released: June 2014

Blackbird is the third studio album by Australian musician Dan Sultan, released in April 2014. The album was his first in five years and was the culmination of many months of writing and recording. Blackbird peaked at number 4 on the ARIA Charts and was certified gold.

Prior to recording the album, Sultan said he hadn't been motivated or inspired to write. He told the ABC "I had to make a few changes and change a few things up to get motivated and get inspired again, and I was in a bit of a rut for a while, so once I did that I found that everything flowed on from there." "You go through what you're going through and that can be pretty heavy. And then you write about what you've been through, which can be therapeutic."

Dan attributes much of his satisfaction with his album to producer Jacquire King, "We had a phone conversation before we even agreed to make the record together, just to see if we would get along. We spoke on the phone for about 40 minutes. I think the first five minutes was about the record and the rest was just talkin' shit, just hanging out. We became friends there and then and we were good friends by the time I left."

At the ARIA Music Awards of 2014, Blackbird was nominated for four awards; winning one, the ARIA Award for Best Rock Album. At the Australian Independent Record (AIR) Awards of 2014, Sultan won the Best Independent Blues and Roots Album for Blackbird. At the National Indigenous Music Awards of 2014, Sultan won National Cover Art of the Year for Blackbird.

== Reception ==
Professional ratings
Review scores
Source	Rating
Rolling Stone Australia	4/5 stars
TheMusic	4/5 stars
ToneDeaf	8/10 stars
The Australian	3.5/5 stars

The Music said "This is a big step forward for Dan Sultan." Tonedeaf said "Blackbird epitomises everything a good Australian rock album should be. A perfectly balanced blend of big band rock n' roll matched with soft, soulful ballads." Iain Shedden from The Australian praised the production work by Jacquire King and said Blackbird plays to Sultan's strengths as a performer and there is much to like in the old-school styles he embraces. Shedden said "It's the strikingly beautiful ballads 'Nobody Knows' and 'Gullible Few' that highlight best Sultan's emotional depth."

Ali Birnie from BeatMagazine said "Named after the famous Nashville studio in which it was recorded, Blackbird showcases Sultan's soulful and charismatic vocals, delivering an impressive array of Aussie rock tunes and heartfelt ballads." adding "This album has delivered that classic rock and soul sound of his that we have come to know so well." Emily Hoskin from Blank GC said "From the opening song, Sultan barely comes up for a breath. Each track is distinct from the last, and as the album progresses, it gets better and better. From country to soul to blues, to Aussie rock and even the appearance of a didgeridoo, Blackbird takes you on a tour through everything Australian music has to be proud of." adding "Blackbird is the album he was born to release. If you have felt slightly underwhelmed with his previous releases, please, give this one a chance. It's good. Really, really good." Patrick Emery from Sydney Morning Heard said "the songwriting is sharp; the production slick."

== Track listing ==
No.	Title	Length
1.	"Make Me Slip"	3:11
2.	"Can't Blame Me"	3:22
3.	"Under Your Skin"	2:24
4.	"High Street Riot"	4:38
5.	"Ain't Thinking About You"	3:12
6.	"Kimberley Calling"	4:13
7.	"The Same Man"	4:11
8.	"Nobody Knows"	4:32
9.	"Waiting On the End of the Phone"	3:02
10.	"It Belongs to Us"	4:05
11.	"No More Expectations"	3:00
12.	"Loving's Just for Fools"	4:15
13.	"Gullible Few"	3:55

== Charts ==
=== Weekly charts ===
Chart (2014)	Peak position
Australian Albums (ARIA)	4

=== Year-end charts ===
Chart (2014)	Rank
Australian Albums Chart	59
Australian Artist Albums Chart	28

== Certifications ==
Region	Certification	Certified units/sales
Australia (ARIA)	Gold	35,000^{^}
^{^} Shipments figures based on certification alone.

== Release history ==
Country	Date	Format	Label	Catalogue
Australia	4 April 2014	Digital download, CD,	Dan Sultan	LMCD0238
