= The Gurrumul Story =

- Deluxe, vinyl and digital artwork

Compilation album by Geoffrey Gurrumul Yunupingu
- Released: 10 September 2021
- Genres: World; Aboriginal; classical crossover
- Length: 59:40
- Label: Decca Australia

Geoffrey Gurrumul Yunupingu chronology
Djarimirri (2018)	The Gurrumul Story (2021)	Banbirrngu – The Orchestral Sessions (2025)

The Gurrumul Story is the first compilation album from Geoffrey Gurrumul Yunupingu. The album was announced on 6 August 2021 and was released on 10 September 2021 on digital platforms, CD, deluxe CD+DVD and vinyl. The deluxe edition features a DVD including a 25-minute documentary covering Yunupingu's life and rise to stardom.

== Background and release ==
Geoffrey Gurrumul Yunupingu was born blind in 1971 as a member of the Gumatj clan and a speaker of the indigenous Yolŋu languages, on Elcho Island, off the coast of North East Arnhem land in Australia's Northern Territory. He incorporated much of his heritage into his music, singing in multiple Yolŋu languages as well as English.

Yunupingu released four studio albums on Skinnyfish Music, all of which won ARIA Music Awards.

Yunupingu died in 2017 at the age of 46, following health issues with his liver and kidneys. He was posthumously signed to Decca Australia in November 2020. This is the first release on Decca.

On 6 August 2021, a trailer for The Gurrumul Story documentary was released alongside a reworked version of his 2008 song "Wiyathul", shared with its music video that shows a group of First Nations people performing what an introduction described as "A sacred totemic dance of the Wiyathul bird."

== Track listing ==
CD
No.	Title	Writer(s)	Album	Length
1.	"Wiyathul (Longing for Place)"	Geoffrey Gurrumul Yunupingu	new version	3:35
2.	"Bȁpa"	Yunupingu	Gurrumul	2:35
3.	"Marwurrumburr"	Yunupingu	Gurrumul	3:15
4.	"Gurrumul History (I Was Born Blind)"	Yunupingu	Gurrumul	5:52
5.	"Wukun"	Yunupingu	Gurrumul	4:14
6.	"Maralitja (A Tribute to Yothu Yindi)"		non-album single	4:27
7.	"Bayini" (featuring Sarah Blasko)		non-album single	4:39
8.	"Banbirrngu"		Rrakala	5:10
9.	"Baru"		Rrakala	5:04
10.	"Djilawurr"		Rrakala	4:04
11.	"Baptism"		The Gospel Album	4:36
12.	"Jesu"		The Gospel Album	4:22
13.	"Nhaku Limurr"		The Gospel Album	4:31
14.	"Amazing Grace" (solo)	John Newton	The Gospel Album	3:16
Total length:				59:40

Deluxe edition bonus tracks
No.	Title	Album	Length
15.	"Waak (Crow) in E-Flat Major"	Djarimirri	5:08
16.	"Galiku (Flag) in D-Flat Major"	Djarimirri	5:01
17.	"Djarimirri (Child of the Rainbow) in E-Flat Major"	Djarimirri	5:08
Total length:			74:57

DVD
No.	Title	Length
1.	"The Gurrumul Story" (documentary)	24:47
2.	"Wiyathul (Longing for Place)" (music video)	3:41
3.	"Bapa" (music video)	2:34
4.	"Gopuru" (music video)	3:50
5.	"Jesu" (music video)	4:37
6.	"Amazing Grace" (featuring Paul Kelly; music video)	4:04

== Charts ==
=== Weekly charts ===
Weekly chart performance for The Gurrumul Story
Chart (2021)	Peak position
Australian Albums (ARIA)	34

== Release history ==
List of release dates, showing formats, label, catalogue and reference
Region	Date	Format(s)	Label	Catalogue	Ref.
Australia	10 September 2021	CD; digital download; streaming	Decca Australia	3586207	
Australia	10 September 2021	CD+DVD (deluxe edition)	Decca Australia	3586208	
Australia	10 September 2021	Vinyl	Decca Australia	3586209	
