= Caiti Baker =

Australian musician

- Origin: Darwin, Northern Territory, Australia
- Occupations: Singer, songwriter
- Formerly of: Sietta
- Website: caitibaker.com

Caiti Baker is an Australian singer-songwriter, producer, harmony arranger, and vocal engineer.

== Early life and education ==
Caiti Baker is from Darwin, Northern Territory. Her father is a blues musician, and Baker was raised on gospel, jazz, big band, rock & roll, blues, and soul music and developed a love for R&B and hip hop in her adolescence.

At the age of 12, Baker was given an 8-track digital recorder and she learnt how to write and record songs. Baker says she was inspired by the like Aretha Franklin, Big Mamma Thornton, Billie Holiday, Nina Simone, Etta James and Little Walter.

== Music career ==
=== 2009-2014: Sietta ===
From 2009, Baker and James Mangohig (AKA Kuya James) formed the duo Sietta. Sietta released two studio albums, two extended plays, touring nationally and internationally before splitting in 2014.

=== 2015-2019: Solo work and Zinc ===
In 2015, Baker signed to Perambulator Records in Darwin. In mid-2015, Baker toured with and supported Dr. G Yunupingu on his The Gospel Album Tour.

In 2016, Baker featured the A.B. Original track "Dead in a Minute" before releasing her debut single "Heavy On My Heart" in August 2016.

Baker released her debut studio album Zinc in October 2017 which received 4 Star reviews from Rolling Stone, The Music and the Weekend Australian. Zinc was Album of the Week on Double J and ABC Darwin and came in at number 44 in Double J's Top 50 Albums of 2017. In that same year, Baker was awarded Northern Territory Best Live Voice of the Year at the National Live Music Awards and performed at festivals, BIGSOUND, and WOMADelaide.

In 2018 Baker continued her national tour, which culminated with the release of the B6 project, a collection of songs that serve as an accompaniment to her debut album Zinc. The 3-track EP titled B6 was digitally released, featuring songs left over from Zinc. The AIR Awards ceremony in that same year, included performances from BAD//DREEMS, Baker Boy, Alex the Astronaut, Fanny Lumsden, Stella Donnelly and Caiti Baker.

The NT Song of the Year in the Blues and Roots category was awarded to Baker in 2018 with "I Won't Sleep" by Caiti Baker, Greg Baker, James Mangohig, and Michael Hohnen. Baker was awarded Best Live Voice of the NT in the National Live Music Awards.

Baker released an AIR Award-winning 2019 EP, Dust (Part 1) and performed at Bluesfest in the same year, she said of Bluesfest, "I kinda grew up at that festival."

=== 2020 ===
The single "Worth It" was released on 8 March 2020, International Women's Day, and was the title track to the podcast Birds Eye View, recorded in collaboration with women in the Darwin Correctional Centre, shining a light inside the prison walls. The podcast went on to win the award for best Australian podcast of the year at the Australian Podcast Awards 2020.

Baker produced a live collective show called "The Settle Down Sisters" (six artists) which was performed at the Darwin Entertainment Centre and supported Jimmy Barnes. The Settle Down Sisters is a collective of women from a diverse range of backgrounds in the NT coming together with the common thread of voice, empowerment, laughter, and food.

On 19 June 2020, Baker released Mary of the North. Baker dedicated the album to the Northern Territory and its unique characters. The album was produced by James Mangohig and featured the single "Carry", a re-recording of the Sietta track "Carry You". Baker said of the album she, "was inspired by the amazing humans that make up my community here in the NT, I want listeners to hear the textures, colours and tones that make this place the incredibly unique and interesting home that it is to many."

Despite so many live performances being cancelled in the year 2020 owing to the COVID-19 pandemic in Australia, including Baker's national tour with George Benson, Caiti performed a once only set (twice) with guest musicians from Perth and longtime collaborator, James Mangohig at Nannup Music Festival in February.

Caiti was an artist-in-residence on ABC Radio's Double J,

In September, Kuya James released an 80s-inspired music video entitled "Rewind Our Love" featuring Caiti Baker & Serina Pech.

Dust (Part 1) won Best Independent Soul/R&B Album or EP Release in the AIR Awards.

Baker featured on, produced, an vocal engineered on "Wirrimu" with Manuel Dhurrkay and "Buddy's Lullaby" with Noni Eather as part of the ABC's children's album, The Moon, The Mouse & The Frog: Lullabies From Northern Australia.

=== 2021 ===
At the end of January 2021, Baker released "She's Cruel (Acoustic Version) [feat. Ben Edgar]".

In May 2021 Baker travelled interstate for her first post-pandemic performance at the Gold Coast festival Blues on Broadbeach.

"Worth it" made number 10 in the "Territory Sounds Countdown 2021" and Baker donated some of the royalties "to the Women of Worth initiative, helping prisoners and ex-prisoners in the community".

As part of the Darwin International Film Festival, Baker's music video for "Gone", which was directed in 2019 by Claudia Sangiorgi Dalimore, was awarded Best Music Video in the 3rd Capricornia Film Awards.

== Discography ==
=== Albums ===
Title	Details
Zinc	Release date: 6 October 2017; Label: Perambulator Records (PRAM170808); Formats: CD, Digital download, LP, streaming
Mary of the North	Release date: 19 June 2020; Label: Settledown Records; Formats: CD, Digital download, LP, streaming

=== Extended plays ===
Title	Details
B6	Release date: 2018; Label: Skinnyfish Music; Formats: Digital download, streaming
Dust (Part 1)	Release date: 8 November 2019; Label: Settle Down Records; Formats: Digital download, streaming

=== Singles ===
==== As lead artist ====
Year	Title	Album
2016	"Heavy On My Heart"	Zinc
2017	"Make Your Own Mistakes"	Zinc
2017	"Wolf"	Zinc
2017	"I Won't Sleep"	Zinc
2018	"Believer"	Zinc
2018	"Gimme"	B6
2018	"Yep Yep"	B6
2018	"La La La"	B6
2019	"Over the Horizon"	Zinc
2019	"Gone"	Dust (Part 1)
2020	"Worth It"	Mary of the North
2020	"Green Eyes"	Mary of the North
2021	"She's Cruel" (acoustic) (featuring Ben Edgar)	—N/a
2021	"Mello"	TBA
2022	"Freak"	TBA

==== As featured artist ====
Year	Title	Album
2016	"Dead in a Minute" (A.B. Original featuring Caiti Baker)	Reclaim Australia
2017	"Here" (Briggs featuring Caiti Baker)	non-album single
2020	"Sophie's Song" (Sensible Antixx featuring Caiti Baker)	TBA

== Awards and nominations ==
=== AIR Awards ===
The Australian Independent Record Awards (commonly known informally as AIR Awards) is an annual awards night to recognise, promote and celebrate the success of Australia's Independent Music sector.

Year	Nominee / work	Award	Result
2018	Zinc	Best Independent Blues and Roots Album	Nominated
2020	The Dust (Pt. 1)	Best Independent Soul/R&B Album or EP	Won

=== APRA Music Awards ===
The APRA Music Awards were established by Australasian Performing Right Association (APRA) in 1982 to honour the achievements of songwriters and music composers, and to recognise their song writing skills, sales and airplay performance, by its members annually.

Year	Nominee / work	Award	Result	Ref.
2026	"Adore Me" by Emily Wurramara (Wurramara and Caiti Baker)	Song of the Year	Shortlisted	

=== ARIA Music Awards ===
The ARIA Music Awards is an annual awards ceremony that recognises excellence, innovation, and achievement across all genres of Australian music.

Year	Nominee / work	Award	Result
2018	Caiti Baker for Gurrumul – Djarimirri (Child of the Rainbow)	Best Cover Art	Won

=== National Indigenous Music Awards ===
The National Indigenous Music Awards (NIMA) is an annual award ceremony and recognises excellence, dedication, innovation and outstanding contribution to the Northern Territory music industry.

Year	Nominee / work	Award	Result
2016	"Dead in a Minute" (A.B. Original featuring Caiti Baker)	Song of the Year	Nominated

=== National Live Music Awards ===
The National Live Music Awards (NLMAs) commenced in 2016 to recognise contributions to the live music industry in Australia.

Year	Nominee / work	Award	Result	Ref.
2017	Caiti Baker	Live R&B or Soul Act of the Year	Nominated	
2017	Caiti Baker	Northern Territory Live Voice of the Year	Won	
2018	Caiti Baker	Live Voice of the Year	Nominated	
2018	Caiti Baker	Live R&B or Soul Act of the Year	Nominated	
2018	Caiti Baker	Northern Territory Live Voice of the Year	Won	
2019	Caiti Baker	Live R&B or Soul Act of the Year	Nominated	
2020	Caiti Baker	Northern Territory Live Act of the Year	Nominated	
2023	Caiti Baker	Best Live Act in the NT	Nominated	
2023	Caiti Baker	Best Live Voice in the NT	Nominated	
