= Gurrumul (disambiguation) =

Geoffrey Gurrumul Yunupingu (1971–2017) was an Aboriginal Australian musician (also referred to since his death as Dr G. Yunupingu)

Gurrumul may also refer to:

- Gurrumul (album), his 2008 self-titled debut album
- Gurrumul (film), a 2017 biographical documentary film
