= National Indigenous Music Awards 2016 =

Annual Australian music awards ceremony

- Date: 6 August 2016
- Venue: The Amphitheatre Botanical Gardens, Northern Territory, Australia

Highlights
- Most wins: Gawurra (4)
- Most nominations: Gawurra & Gurrumul (5)
- Website: nima.musicnt.com.au

Television/radio coverage
- Network: National Indigenous Television

The National Indigenous Music Awards 2016 were the 13th annual National Indigenous Music Awards.

The nominations were announced on 31 July 2016 and the awards ceremony was held on 6 August 2016.

The theme for this year's award was Protest Songs. The year, celebrated the 50th anniversary of the Wave Hill walk-off the 40th anniversary of the Aboriginal Land Rights Act 1976 and 25 years since the release of Yothu Yindi's Tribal Voice.

== Performers ==
- A.B. Original
- Shellie Morris
- Warren H. Williams and Danielle Young
- Kahl Wallis
- Lonely Boys
- Stanley Gaykamangu
- Yirrmal with his father Witiyana Marika (of Yothu Yindi)
- Rayella
- Chris Tamwoy
- David Spry
- Kuren

== Hall of Fame Inductee ==
- Kutcha Edwards

Kutcha Edwards is an indigenous Australian singer and songwriter, born in Balranald, New South Wales in 1965. He is a member of the Stolen Generations, and was removed from his parents at the age of 18 months. He is a Mutti Mutti man. He was named Indigenous Person of the Year at the 2001 NAIDOC Awards. He has released four studio albums between 2001-2015.

== Triple J Unearthed National Indigenous Winner ==
- Kuren

Kuren (aka Curtis Kennedy) is an 18 year old producer, of the Wiradjuri people. Kuren uploaded "Home" featuring Ben Alessi in May 2016 onto Triple J Unearthed and has collaborated with Allday, Sophie Lowe and Banks.

== Awards ==
Artist of the Year

Artist	Result
Emma Donovan	Nominated
Dan Sultan	Nominated
Gurrumul	Won

New Talent of the Year

Artist	Result
A.B. Original	Nominated
Benny Walker	Nominated
Gawurra	Won
Emily Wurramara	Nominated
Chris Tamwoy	Nominated

Album of the Year

Artist and album	Result
Gawurra – Ratja Yaliyali	Won
Gurrumul – The Gospel Album	Nominated
Dan Sultan – Open Live – Live from the National Theatre, Melbourne	Nominated

Film Clip of the Year

Artist and song	Result
Briggs, Dewayne Everettsmith & Gurrumul – "The Children Came Back"	Nominated
Gawurra – "Ratja Yaliyali"	Won
Benny Walker – "Oh No You Don't"	Nominated

Song of the Year

Artist and song	Result
A.B. Original featuring Caiti Baker – "Dead in a Minute"	Nominated
A.B. Original – "2 Black 2 Strong"	Nominated
Gawurra – "Ratja Yaliyali"	Nominated
Briggs, Dewayne Everettsmith & Gurrumul – "The Children Came Back"	Won
Benny Walker – "Oh No You Don't"	Nominated

Cover Art of the Year

Artist and album	Result
Gawurra – Ratja Yaliyali	Won
Gurrumul – The Gospel Album	Nominated
Benny Walker – Oh No You Don't	Nominated

Traditional Song of the Year

Artist and song	Result
Ishmael Marika – "Two Sisters Journey"	Won

Community Clip of the Year

Artist and song	Result
Galiwinku – "Yolngu Style"	Nominated
Ngukurr – "Break the Silence"	Won
Katherine – "Shadows"	Nominated
