= National Indigenous Music Awards 2011 =

Annual Australian music awards ceremony

- Date: 20 August 2011
- Venue: Northern Territory, Australia

Highlights
- Most wins: Geoffrey Gurrumul Yunupingu (5)
- Most nominations: Geoffrey Gurrumul Yunupingu (6)
- Website: nima.musicnt.com.au

The National Indigenous Music Awards 2011 were the eighth annual National Indigenous Music Awards; However (and despite its name), 2011 was the first time the event went national after its first seven years had purely focused on the Northern Territory artists.

The nominations were announced on 10 August 2011 and awards ceremony was held on 20 August 2011.

== Hall of Fame Inductee ==
- Coloured Stone & No Fixed Address

Coloured Stone is a band that formed in 1977 from the Koonibba Mission, South Australia. They won the ARIA Award for Best Indigenous Release at the ARIA Music Awards of 1987.

No Fixed Address is an Australian Aboriginal reggae rock group formed in 1979. They released Wrong Side of the Road in 1981 and From My Eyes in 1982, both peaked with the Australian top 100.

== Awards ==
Act of the Year

Artist	Result
Jessica Mauboy	Nominated
Dan Sultan	Nominated
Geoffrey Gurrumul Yunupingu	Won

New Talent of the Year

Artist	Result
Rrawun Maymuru	Won

Album of the Year

Artist and album	Result
Leah Flanagan - Nirvana Nights	Nominated
Saltwater Band - Mark	Nominated
Geoffrey Gurrumul Yunupingu - Rrakala	Won
Jessica Mauboy - Get 'Em Girls	Nominated
Frank Yamma - Country Man	Nominated

DVD/Film Clip of the Year

Artist and song	Result
Gurrumul Geoffrey Yunupingu & Blue King Brown – "History"	Won

Song of the Year

Artist and song	Result
Stiff Gins – "Diamonds on the Water"	Nominated
Leah Flanagan – "September Song"	Nominated
The Medics – "Beggars"	Nominated
Frank Yamma – "Calling Your Name"	Nominated
Gurrumul Geoffrey Yunupingu– "Gathu Mawala"	Won
Gurrumul Geoffrey Yunupingu – "Mala Rrakala"	Nominated

Artwork of the Year

Artist and album	Result
Gurrumul Geoffrey Yunupingu - Rrakala	Won

Traditional Music Award

Artist and song	Result
Yilpara, Madarrpa clan – "Djambawa Marawili"	Won
Gurrumuru, Dhalwangu clan – "Yumutjin Wunungmurra"	Won
Dhalinybuy, Wangurri clan – "Mathulu Munyarryun"	Won
