= Banbirrngu – The Orchestral Sessions =

Live album by Geoffrey Gurrumul Yunupingu
- Released: 8 November 2024
- Length: 44:59
- Label: Skinnyfish; Decca Australia
- Producer: Michael Hohnen

Geoffrey Gurrumul Yunupingu chronology
The Gurrumul Story (2021)	Banbirrngu – The Orchestral Sessions (2024)

Banbirrngu – The Orchestral Sessions is a posthumous album by Geoffrey Gurrumul Yunupingu. The album was recorded in Prague by the Prague Metropolitan Orchestra, conducted by Jan Chalupecký and produced by Michael Hohnen. The album revisits previously released songs with the backing of the orchestra. It was announced in September 2024 and was released on 8 November 2024.

Michael Hohnen said "We hope that his voice and importance has been honoured on this new album as we revisit and re-present, his much-loved, delicate, powerful and enigmatic voice, to the wider mainstream world for all to experience. There has been no other like Gurrumul, and I doubt there will ever be again"

At the 2025 ARIA Music Awards, the album won Best World Music Album; his tenth ARIA award and fifth in this category.

== Reception ==
Joseph Guenzler from National Indigenous Times said "The orchestral arrangements introduce a unique emotional depth and dynamic range to Gurrumul's music, enriching his vocals in a way that an acoustic trio cannot replicate." calling the album a "masterpiece".

== Track listing ==
Banbirrngu – The Orchestral Sessions track listing
No.	Title	Length
1.	"Banbirrngu"	5:22
2.	"Baru"	5:15
3.	"Amazing Grace"	3:43
4.	"Bapa"	3:04
5.	"Wiyathul (Longing for Place)"	6:14
6.	"Djilawurr"	4:18
7.	"Djarimirri"	4:16
8.	"Gurrumul History"	4:12
9.	"Wukun"	4:27
10.	"Gathu Mawula"	4:26
Total length:		44:59

== Charts ==
=== Weekly charts ===
Weekly chart performance for Banbirrngu – The Orchestral Sessions
Chart (2024)	Peak position
Australian Classical Crossover Albums (ARIA)	2

=== Year-end charts ===
Year-end chart performance for Banbirrngu – The Orchestral Sessions
Chart (2024)	Position
Australian Classical Crossover Albums (ARIA)	4
