= Gurrumul (film) =

- Theatrical film poster
- Directed by: Paul Damien Williams
- Produced by: Shannon Swan
- Cinematography: Gavin Head, Dan Maxwell, Katie Millwright, Matt Toll
- Distributed by: Madman Films
- Release date: 26 April 2018
- Country: Australia
- Language: English

Gurrumul is a 2018 Australian documentary film about the life of Geoffrey Gurrumul Yunupingu. The film premiered at the Berlin Film Festival in February 2018 to positive reviews. The film was released in Australia on 26 April 2018.

== Background ==
Gurrumul is a (year) Australian documentary film about the Indigenous Australian musician Geoffrey Gurrumul Yunupingu (1970–2017), who was blind from birth and came from Elcho Island in North East Arnhem Land. The film follows his life as a Yolngu man and his career after the release of his debut solo album, Gurrumul (2008).

Director Paul Williams became the in-house filmmaker at Skinnyfish Music, Gurrumul's Darwin-based record label in 2012, and came up with the idea to make the documentary. Williams said "I really wanted to show the difficulty that an indigenous person from a remote traditional community has interfacing with the white, balanda, world. In particular interfacing with the expectation of celebrity, the expectation of fame and the expectations of what was rapidly becoming an international music career." adding "I'd really love it to be on school curriculum after the theatrical release is done because the kind of conversations that can be had around this film, and its central themes about Australia, about the future of this country, about the future of race relations, I think is really important."

== Reception ==
Gurrumul was met with positive reviews from critics and audiences, sitting on 8.9/10 on the Internet Movie Database.

Luke Buckmaster from The Guardian gave the film 4.5 out of 5, saying "Core to the film is the question of what it means to be an Indigenous Australian in the modern world." He added: "For Gurrumul fans, the film is obviously a must-see. For those unfamiliar, or vaguely familiar with his work, it’s an even greater treat: they will be entertained, enthralled, perhaps in some small way changed."

Stephanie Bunbury from The Sydney Morning Herald said "Gurrumul was blind from birth but... he could play any instrument he picked up. He played with Yothu Yindi, then with his own group Saltwater Band before releasing a self-titled solo album in 2008.... He won ARIA Awards; he played for the Queen and for Barack Obama, continuing all the while to live on Elcho Island, hunting and fishing. The film makes it clear this wasn't always an easy mix."

Award	Date of ceremony	Category	Recipient(s)	Result	Ref(s)
Asia Pacific Screen Awards	29 November 2018	Best Documentary Feature Film	Shannon Swan, Paul Damien Williams	Won	
Australian Academy of Cinema and Television Arts (AACTA) Awards	3 December 2018	Best Feature Length Documentary	Paul Damien Williams, Shannon Swan	Won	
Australian Academy of Cinema and Television Arts (AACTA) Awards	3 December 2018	Best Cinematography in a Documentary	Dan Maxwell, Katie Milwright, Matt Toll, Gavin Head	Nominated	
Australian Academy of Cinema and Television Arts (AACTA) Awards	3 December 2018	Best Editing in a Documentary	Shannon Swan, Ken Sallows	Nominated	
Australian Academy of Cinema and Television Arts (AACTA) Awards	3 December 2018	Best Sound in a Documentary	Pip Atherstone-Reid, Simon Rosenberg	Nominated	
Australian Academy of Cinema and Television Arts (AACTA) Awards	3 December 2018	Best Original Music Score in a Documentary	Geoffrey Gurrumul Yunupingu, Erkki Veltheim, Michael Hohnen, Matthew Cunliffe	Nominated	

In 2019, the film won a Grand Jury Special Prize (Prix Spécial du Jury) at the FIFO film festival in Tahiti.
