= NT Indigenous Music Awards 2008 =

Annual Australian music awards ceremony

- Date: 30 August 2008
- Venue: Northern Territory, Australia

Highlights
- Most wins: Geoffrey Gurrumul Yunupingu (4)
- Most nominations: Geoffrey Gurrumul Yunupingu (6)
- Website: nima.musicnt.com.au

The NT Indigenous Music Awards 2008 was the fifth annual National Indigenous Music Awards.

The awards ceremony was held on 30 August 2008.

== Performers ==
- The Kenbi Dancers opened the award evening
- WildWater
- Tom E Lewis, Roy Ashley, and Micky Hall.
- The Saltwater Band and Chooky Dancers from Elcho Island.

== Hall of Fame Inductee ==
- Peter Miller and Blek Bala Mujik, Mark Raymond and the Kulumindini Band

== Special Recognition Award ==
- Galarrwuy Yunupingu and Mr Nundhirribala

== Awards ==
Act of the Year

Artist	Result
Geoffrey Gurrumul Yunupingu	Won
Leah Flanagan	Nominated

Emerging Act of the Year

Artist	Result
B2M (Bathurst to Melville)	Won

Album of the Year

Artist and album	Result
Geoffrey Gurrumul Yunupingu - Gurrumul	Won

DVD/Film Clip of the Year

Artist and song	Result
Saltwater Band Live	Won

Song of the Year

Artist and song	Result
Geoffrey Gurrumul Yunupingu – "Wiyathul"	Won

Artwork of the Year

Artist and album	Result
Geoffrey Gurrumul Yunupingu - Gurrumul	Won

Gospel Album of the Year

Artist and album	Result
Harold Dalywaters and the Elliot Gospel Band - Harold Dalywaters and the Elliot Gospel Band	Won

Traditional Music Award

Artist and song	Result
Muyngarnbi – Songs from Walking with Spirits	Won
Ngarukuruwala - "We Sing Songs"	Won

Most Popular Song

Artist and song	Result
WildWater -	Won

School Band of the Year

Artist and song	Result
Rocky Creek Band	Won
