= Live in Darwin, Australia =

Live album by Gurrumul
- Released: 16 July 2010
- Genre: World Music, Aboriginal
- Length: 30:09
- Label: Skinnyfish Music

Gurrumul albums chronology
Gurrumul (2008)	Live in Darwin, Australia (2010)	Rrakala (2011)

Live in Darwin, Australia is the first live album by Gurrumul. The album was recorded in Darwin, Australia, and includes six tracks lifted from Gurrumul's self-titled debut studio album.

== Reception ==
Mark Hudson from The Telegraph said "While the songs on this atmospheric live EP are structured on the lines of Western ballads, his high pitched singing in his Yolngu language has an incantatory intensity that makes for truly haunting listening."

== Track listing ==
CD/DD

1. "Djilawurr (Orange-Footed Scrub Fowl)" - 4:14
2. "Gathu Mawula" - 3:59
3. "Djarimirri" - 3:40
4. "Marrandil" - 6:58
5. "Gurrumul History (I Was Born Blind)" - 6:30
6. "Wukun" - 4:48
