= Daniel Giorgetti =

British composer

Daniel Giorgetti is a British composer of concert music and film and television scores . Giorgetti was born 1971 in London and studied piano and composition at the London College of Music with Martin Ellerby, and the Royal College of Music with Edwin Roxburgh. His concert music has been performed in festivals and concert series in the US, the UK and mainland Europe – including the Park Lane Group Series, the Huddersfield Contemporary Music Festival and the Gaudeamus Foundation New Music Week in Amsterdam. It has also been broadcast on BBC Radio 3. His music has been awarded several prizes, among others the Worshipful Company of Musicians' Silver Medal, a Ralph Vaughan Williams Trust award and the Huddersfield Contemporary Music Festival Young Composers' Award in 2000.He is famously known for The Hour (2011), Foyle's War (2002) and Safe House (2015).
