= Traveling Light (1944 film) =

1944 film

- Directed by: Jean Anouilh
- Screenplay by: Jean Anouilh
- Based on: Le Voyageur sans bagage by Jean Anouilh
- Produced by: Léon Carré
- Starring: Pierre Fresnay; Blanchette Brunoy
- Cinematography: Christian Matras
- Edited by: Jean Feyte
- Music by: Francis Poulenc
- Production company: Eclair-Journal
- Release date: 23 February 1944
- Running time: 99 minutes
- Country: France
- Language: French

Traveling Light (French: Le Voyageur sans bagage) is a 1944 French drama film directed by Jean Anouilh, starring Pierre Fresnay and Blanchette Brunoy.

== Plot ==
The narrative is set in 1931, when a man with amnesia tries to recover his memories from World War I, in order to find out what kind of man he really is. The film is based on Anouilh's 1937 play with the same title.

== Cast ==
- Pierre Fresnay as Gaston
- Blanchette Brunoy as Valentine
- Pierre Renoir as Georges Renaud
- Marguerite Deval as Countess Dupont-Dufort
- Louis Salou as Maître Uspard)
- Odette Barencey as une parente
- Mercédès Brare
- Jean Brochard as Marcel Berthier
- Pierre Brûlé as the little boy
- Jenny Burnay as Juliette

== Production ==
Just like with Jean Cocteau, World War II gave Jean Anouilh the opportunity to advance in the French film industry. Anouilh had written dialogue for several films in the 1930s, but Traveling Light was his directorial debut. He would eventually direct one additional film, Two Pennies Worth of Violets from 1951. The screenplay for Traveling Light was based on Anouilh's own 1937 play Le Voyageur sans bagage. Filming began on 4 October 1943.

== Music ==
On 9 October 2026, a reconstruction of Francis Poulenc's score for the film was recorded by the Prague Metropolitan Orchestra at Studio Martínek in Prague, conducted by Shea Lolin. The orchestral reconstruction was undertaken by Antony Gray, with the score edited and prepared by Lolin, and used by exclusive permission of the Estate of Francis Poulenc.

== Reception ==
The film premiered on 23 February 1944. It was successful although the records of the release are fragmentary, because the theatrical run coincided with the Allied invasion of France. The film was criticized by the church for its "systematic ridicule of the family".
