= 2018 ARIA Music Awards =

Annual Australian music awards

- Date: 28 November 2018
- Venue: Star Event Centre, Sydney, New South Wales

Highlights
- Most wins: Amy Shark (4); Gurrumul (4)
- Most nominations: Amy Shark (9)
- Website: ariaawards.com.au

Television/radio coverage
- Network: Nine Network

The 32nd Annual Australian Recording Industry Association Music Awards (generally known as the ARIA Music Awards or simply the ARIAs) are a series of award ceremonies which include the 2018 ARIA Artisan Awards, ARIA Hall of Fame Awards, ARIA Fine Arts Awards and the ARIA Awards. The ARIA Awards ceremony was held on 28 November 2018 and broadcast from the Star Event Centre, Sydney around Australia on the Nine Network.

On 25 September 2018 it was announced that Keith Urban would host the event. Final nominations were provided on 11 October 2018. At the same time ARIA presented trophies for the winners of the Artisan and Fine Arts awards. In total Amy Shark won four categories from nine nominations, while Geoffrey Gurrumul Yunupingu posthumously won four from seven nominations.

Country music singer-songwriter and musician, Kasey Chambers, was inducted into the ARIA Hall of Fame by Paul Kelly. Fellow singers, Missy Higgins, Kate Miller-Heidke, and Amy Sheppard provided their rendition of "Not Pretty Enough". Chambers, who had also won her ninth Best Country Album for Campfire, performed the answer song, "Ain't No Little Girl".

== Performers ==
Performers for the ARIA Awards ceremony:

Artist(s)	Song(s)
Rita Ora	"Let You Love Me"
5 Seconds of Summer	"Youngblood"
Amy Shark	"I Said Hi"
Courtney Barnett	"Charity"
Keith Urban; Amy Shark	"Parallel Line" "The Fighter"
Dean Lewis	"Be Alright"
Kate Miller-Heidke; Amy Sheppard; Missy Higgins; Kasey Chambers	"Not Pretty Enough" "Ain't No Little Girl"
George Ezra	"Shotgun"

== ARIA Hall of Fame inductee ==
2018 ARIA Hall of Fame inductee
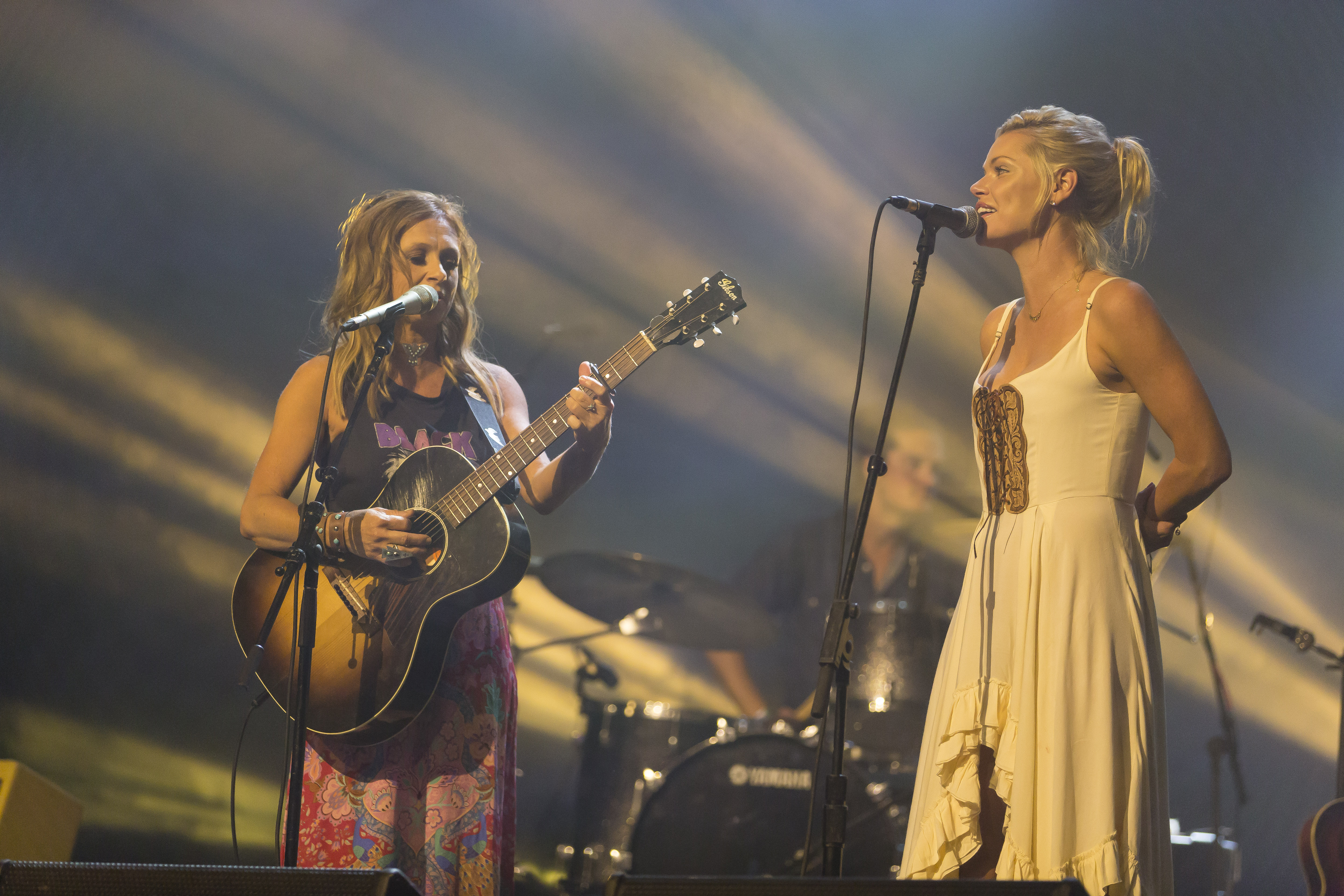
Kasey Chambers (left), April 2017

When Kasey Chambers was announced as the ARIA Hall of Fame inductee, in mid-November, she responded, "I am so proud to have been able to create the music I love in a way that has always felt so true and authentic to me and to have it reach so many people. [... It] is one of the greatest honours I could possibly imagine and I am so humbled to get the chance on the night to share the journey this little country singer from the Nullarbor has actually had."

At the ceremony Chambers was inducted by sometime collaborator, producer and fellow Hall of Famer, Paul Kelly, who recited a specially written poem for her and then accompanied her on keyboards. Fellow singers, Missy Higgins, Kate Miller-Heidke, and Amy Sheppard provided their rendition of Chambers' track, "Not Pretty Enough" and she responded with "Ain't No Little Girl". In her acceptance speech she referenced her parents, "My mum has taught me over the years that being a bitch doesn't make you strong, and being strong doesn't make you a bitch. It's knowing the difference between the two [...] My dad said to me once, 'just don't be a dickhead'. It's been the best advice to follow ... You don't have to drag other people down to get to the top."

== Nominees and winners ==
=== ARIA Awards ===
Album of the Year	Best Group
**Amy Shark – Love Monster (Wonderlick Recording Company)**; Courtney Barnett – Tell Me How You Really Feel (Milk! Records/Remote Control Records); Gurrumul – Djarimirri (Child of the Rainbow) (SFM/MGM); Pnau – Changa (Etcetc Music); Troye Sivan – Bloom (EMI Music)	**5 Seconds of Summer – Youngblood (Capitol UK/EMI Music)**; DMA's – For Now (I OH YOU); Peking Duk – "Fire" (Sony Music Entertainment); Pnau – "Go Bang" (Etcetc Music); Rüfüs Du Sol – "No Place" (Sony Music Entertainment)
Best Male Artist	Best Female Artist
**Gurrumul – Djarimirri (Child of the Rainbow) (SFM/MGM)**; Dan Sultan – Killer Under a Blood Moon (Liberation Records); Dean Lewis – "Be Alright" (Island Records Australia/Universal Music Australia); Troye Sivan – Bloom (EMI Music); Vance Joy – Nation of Two (Liberation Records)	**Amy Shark – Love Monster (Wonderlick Recording Company)**; Alison Wonderland – Awake (EMI Music); Courtney Barnett – Tell Me How You Really Feel (Milk! Records/Remote Control Records); Sia – "Flames" (What A Music Ltd, Under Exclusive License To Warner Music Group); Tash Sultana – Flow State (Lonely Lands Records/Sony Music Entertainment)
Best Adult Contemporary Album	Best Urban Release
**Vance Joy – Nation of Two (Liberation Records)**; Courtney Barnett & Kurt Vile – Lotta Sea Lice (Milk! Records/Remote Control Records); Dan Sultan – Killer Under a Blood Moon (Liberation Records); Missy Higgins – Solastalgia (Eleven: A Music Company/EMI Music); Odette – To a Stranger (EMI Music)	**Hilltop Hoods – "Clark Griswold" (feat. Adrian Eagle) (Hilltop Hoods/Universal Music Australia)**; 360 – Vintage Modern (Forthwrite/EMI Music); Esoterik – My Astral Plane (Flight Deck/Mushroom Group); Kerser – Engraved in the Game (ABK Records. Marked & Distributed By ADA, A Division Of Warner Music Australia Pty Ltd); Mojo Juju – Native Tongue (ABC Music/Universal Music Australia)
Best Hard Rock/Heavy Metal Album	Best Rock Album
**Parkway Drive – Reverence (Resist Records/Cooking Vinyl Australia)**; DZ Deathrays – Bloody Lovely (I OH YOU); King Parrot – Ugly Produce (EVP Recordings/Rocket); Polaris – The Mortal Coil (Resist Records/Cooking Vinyl Australia); West Thebarton – Different Beings Being Different (Domestic La La/Sony Music Entertainment)	**Courtney Barnett – Tell Me How You Really Feel (Milk! Records/Remote Control Records)**; Camp Cope – How to Socialise & Make Friends (Poison City Records); DMA's – For Now (I OH YOU); Luca Brasi – Stay (Cooking Vinyl Australia); Middle Kids – Lost Friends (EMI Music)
Best Blues & Roots Album	Best Country Album
**Tash Sultana – Flow State (Lonely Lands Records/Sony Music Entertainment)**; Angus & Julia Stone – Snow (Angus & Julia Stone Pty Ltd/EMI Music); Emily Wurramara – Milyakburra (Wantok Musik/MGM); Mama Kin Spender – Golden Magnetic (ABC Music/Universal Music Australia); Ruby Boots – Don’t Talk About It (Island Records Australia/Universal Music Australia)	**Kasey Chambers & the Fireside Disciples – Campfire (Essence Group Entertainment. Marked & Distributed By Warner Music Australia Pty Ltd)**; Adam Eckersley & Brooke McClymont – Adam & Brooke (Lost Highway Australia/Universal Music Australia); Fanny Lumsden – Real Class Act (Red Dirt Road/AWAL); The Wolfe Brothers – Country Heart (ABC Music/Universal Music Australia); Travis Collins – Brave & the Broken (ABC Music/Universal Music Australia)
Best Pop Release	Best Dance Release
**Amy Shark – Love Monster (Wonderlick Recording Company)**; 5 Seconds of Summer – Youngblood (Capitol UK/EMI Music); Dean Lewis – "Be Alright" (Island Records Australia/Universal Music Australia); Jack River – Sugar Mountain (I OH YOU); Troye Sivan – Bloom (EMI Music)	**Pnau – "Go Bang" (Etcetc Music)**; Alison Wonderland – Awake (EMI Music); Fisher – "Losing It" (Etcetc Music); Peking Duk – "Fire" (Sony Music Entertainment); Rüfüs Du Sol – "No Place" (Sony Music Entertainment)
Breakthrough Artist	Best Independent Release
**Ruel – "Dazed & Confused" (RCA Records/Sony Music Entertainment)**; Alex Lahey – I Love You Like a Brother (Nicky Boy Records/Caroline Australia); Jack River – Sugar Mountain (I OH YOU); Mojo Juju – Native Tongue (ABC Music/Universal Music Australia); Odette – To a Stranger (EMI Music)	**Gurrumul – Djarimirri (Child of the Rainbow) (SFM/MGM)**; Angus & Julia Stone – Snow (Angus & Julia Stone Pty Ltd/EMI Music); Courtney Barnett – Tell Me How You Really Feel (Milk! Records/Remote Control Records); DMA's – For Now (I OH YOU); Pnau – "Go Bang" (Etcetc Music)
Best Children's Album
**Justine Clarke – The Justine Clarke Show! (ABC KIDS/Universal Music Australia)**; Lah-Lah – 10th Birthday Party (Stella Projects/Sony Music Entertainment); Sam Moran – Santa's Coming! (Sony Music Entertainment); Teeny Tiny Stevies – Helpful Songs for Little People (ABC KIDS/Universal Music Australia); The Wiggles – Wiggle Pop! (ABC KIDS/Universal Music Australia)

=== Public voted ===
Song of the Year	Best Video
**5 Seconds of Summer – "Youngblood" (Capitol UK/EMI Music)**; Amy Shark – "I Said Hi" (Wonderlick Recording Company); Angus & Julia Stone – "Chateau" (Angus & Julia Stone Pty Ltd/EMI Music); Conrad Sewell – "Healing Hands" (Sony Music Entertainment); Dean Lewis – "Be Alright" (Island Records Australia/Universal Music Australia); Peking Duk – "Fire/Reprisal" (Sony Music Entertainment); Pnau – "Go Bang" (Etcetc Music); Sheppard – "Coming Home" (Chugg Music/MGM); Troye Sivan – "My My My!" (EMI Music); Vance Joy – "Lay It on Me" (Liberation Records)	**Jessie Hill for Dean Lewis – "Be Alright" (Island Records Australia/Universal Music Australia)**; Amy Shark and Nicholas Waterman for Amy Shark – "I Said Hi" (Wonderlick Recording Company); Claudia Sangiorgi Dalimore for Mojo Juju – "Native Tongue" (ABC Music/Universal Music Australia); Danny Cohen for Courtney Barnett – "Need a Little Time" (Milk! Records/Remote Control Records); David Porte Beckefeld for Client Liaison – "Survival in the City" (Warner Music Australia Pty Ltd); Glenn Mossop and Tash Sultana for Tash Sultana – "Salvation" (Lonely Lands Records/Sony Music Entertainment); Kris Moyes for The Presets – "Do What You Want" (Modular/EMI Music); Patrick Rohl for Gang of Youths – "The Heart Is a Muscle" (Mosy Recordings/Sony Music Entertainment); Ryan Sauer for Peking Duk – "Fire" (Sony Music Entertainment); Toby Pike and Nick Littlemore for Pnau – "Go Bang" (Etcetc Music)
Best Australian Live Act	Best International Artist
**5 Seconds of Summer – Meet You There Tour (Capitol UK/EMI Music)**; Amy Shark – Love Monster Tour (Wonderlick Recording Company); Client Liaison – Expo Liaison (Warner Music Australia Pty Ltd); Courtney Barnett – Tell Me How You Really Feel National Tour (Milk! Records/Remote Control Records); Dean Lewis – 2017 National Tour (Island Records Australia/Universal Music Australia); Gang of Youths – Gang of Youths 2017 National Tour (Mosy Recordings/Sony Music Entertainment); Paul Kelly – Life Is Fine Tour 2017 (EMI Music); Peking Duk – The Wasted Tour (Sony Music Entertainment); Pnau – Pnau Changa Australian Tour (Etcetc Music); Tash Sultana – The Homecoming Tour (Lonely Lands Records/Sony Music Entertainment)	**Camila Cabello – Camila (Syco/Epic/Sony Music Entertainment)**; Drake – Scorpion and More Life (Republic/Universal Music Australia); Ed Sheeran – ÷ (Warner Music Australia Pty Ltd); Eminem – Revival and Kamikaze (Interscope/Universal Music Australia); Imagine Dragons – Evolve (Interscope/Universal Music Australia); Khalid – American Teen (RCA/Sony Music Entertainment); P!nk – Beautiful Trauma (RCA/Sony Music Entertainment); Post Malone – Beerbongs & Bentleys and Stoney (Universal Music Australia); Sam Smith – The Thrill of It All (Capitol/EMI Music); Taylor Swift – Reputation (Big Machine Records/Universal Music Australia)
Music Teacher of the Year
**Scott Maxwell – Grant High School, Mount Gambier SA 5209**; Becky Hall – Education Institute, Royal Children's Hospital Melbourne VIC 3052; Dean Harawira – Nerang State High School, Gold Coast QLD 4211; Deborah Skelton – Caladenia Primary School, Canning Vale WA 6155

=== Fine Arts Awards ===
Winners are listed first and highlighted in boldface; other final nominees are listed alphabetically by artists' first name.

Best Classical Album
- **Slava Grigoryan – Bach: Cello Suites Volume II (ABC Classics/Universal Music Australia)**
  - Greta Bradman, Adelaide Symphony Orchestra, Adelaide Chamber Singers & Luke Dollman – Home (Decca Classics/Universal Music Australia)
  - Ray Chen – The Golden Age (Decca Classics/Universal Music Australia)
  - Sally Whitwell – Philip Glass: Complete Etudes for Solo Piano (ABC Classics/Universal Music Australia)
  - Tamara-Anna Cislowska, Tasmanian Symphony Orchestra & Johannes Fritzsch – Into Silence: Part|Vasks|Gorecki|Pelecis (ABC Classics/Universal Music Australia)
Best Jazz Album
- **Jonathan Zwartz – Animarum (Jonathan Zwartz/Planet/MGM)**
  - Barney McAll – Hearing the Blood (Extra Celestial Arts)
  - Elixir feat. Katie Noonan – Gratitude and Grief (KIN MUSIC/Universal Music Australia)
  - Jake Mason Trio – The Stranger in the Mirror (Soul Messin' Records/Inertia Music)
  - James Morrison, Patti Austin, Melbourne Symphony Orchestra & Benjamin Northey – Ella and Louis (ABC Jazz/Universal Music Australia)
Best World Music Album
- **Gurrumul – Djarimirri (Child of the Rainbow) (SFM/MGM)**
  - Joseph Tawadros – The Bluebird, the Mystic and the Fool (Independent/Planet)
  - Melbourne Ska Orchestra – Ska Classics (ABC Music/FOUR FOUR/Universal Music Australia)
  - Mista Savona – Havana Meets Kingston (ABC Music/Universal Music Australia)
  - Xylouris White – Mother (ABC Music/Universal Music Australia)
Best Original Soundtrack or Musical Theatre Cast Album
- **Jimmy Barnes – Working Class Boy: The Soundtracks (BLOODLINES)**
  - Evelyn Ida Morris – Acute Misfortune (Original Soundtrack) (ABC Music/Universal Music Australia)
  - Jessica Mauboy – The Secret Daughter Season Two (Songs for the Original 7 Series) (Sony Music Entertainment)
  - Liars – 1/1 (Original Soundtrack) (Mute/Inertia Music)
  - Various artists – Muriel's Wedding: The Musical (The Original Cast Recording) (Global Creatures/Sony Music Entertainment)
Best Comedy Release
- **Bridie and Wyatt, Tonightly with Tom Ballard – Sex Pest (ABC Music/Universal Music Australia)**
  - Akmal Saleh – Transparent (Universal Sony Pictures Home Entertainment)
  - Aunty Donna – Aunty Donna the Album (Etcetc Music)
  - Lawrence Mooney – Moonman (Universal Sony Pictures Home Entertainment)
  - Luke Heggie – Tiprat (Century)

=== Artisan Awards ===
Winners are listed first and highlighted in boldface; other final nominees are listed alphabetically by artists' first name.

Producer of the Year
- **Dann Hume & M-Phazes for Amy Shark – "I Said Hi" (Wonderlick Recording Company)**
  - Ball Park Music for Ball Park Music – Good Mood (Stop Start Music/Inertia Music)
  - Courtney Barnett, Dan Luscombe & Burke Reid for Courtney Barnett – Tell Me How You Really Feel (Milk! Records/Remote Control Records)
  - Michael Hohnen for Gurrumul – Djarimirri (Child of the Rainbow) (SFM/MGM)
  - Tash Sultana for Tash Sultana – Flow State (Lonely Lands Records/Sony Music Entertainment)
Engineer of the Year
- **Burke Reid for Courtney Barnett – Tell Me How You Really Feel (Milk! Records/Remote Control Records)**
  - Dann Hume & M-Phazes for Amy Shark – "I Said Hi" (Wonderlick Recording Company)
  - Holly Rankin, Xavier Dunn & John Castle for Jack River – Sugar Mountain (I OH YOU)
  - Sam Cromack for Ball Park Music – Good Mood (Stop Start Music/Inertia Music)
  - Ted Howard, Robin Mai & Matthew Cunliffe for Gurrumul – Djarimirri (Child of the Rainbow) (SFM/MGM)
Best Cover Art
- **Caiti Baker for Gurrumul – Djarimirri (Child of the Rainbow) (SFM/MGM)**
  - Ben Lopez for Tash Sultana – Flow State (Lonely Lands Records/Sony Music Entertainment)
  - Dean Hanson for Ball Park Music – Good Mood (Stop Start Music/Inertia Music)
  - Jonathan Zawada for The Presets – Hi Viz (Modular/EMI Music)
  - Steve Wyper for Amy Shark – Love Monster (Wonderlick Recording Company)
