= Ego Lemos =

- Born: 1972 (age 53–54); Aileu
- Genres: folk
- Instruments: vocals, guitar, harmonica
- Label: Skinnyfish Music

Ego Lemos is a permaculturist and singer-songwriter from East Timor who sings in his native tongue, Tetum.

His song "Balibo" (featured in the 2009 film Balibo) was awarded best original song composed for the screen at the 2009 Screen Music Awards and a 2009 APRA Award for best song in a film. His debut solo album, produced by Michael Hohnen, was released in 2009.

Lemos also plays with the popular East Timorese band Cinco do Oriente, a band named after a band that existed before the 1975 Indonesian invasion of East Timor.

In 2023, Lemos was appointed Presidential Goodwill Ambassador and Special Envoy for Culture, Environment and Water Resources at Permakultura Timor Lorosa’e.

== Discography ==
- O Hele Le (2009) - Skinnyfish Music
