= His Life and Music =

Live album by Gurrumul and the Sydney Symphony Orchestra
- Released: 6 December 2013
- Recorded: 28/29 May 2013
- Genre: World music, Aboriginal
- Label: Skinnyfish Music; ABC Music

Gurrumul albums chronology
Rrakala (2011)	His Life and Music (2013)	The Gospel Album (2015)

His Life and Music is a live album by Gurrumul and The Sydney Symphony Orchestra. The album was recorded live at the Sydney Opera House for Vivid Festival in May 2013, and released through ABC Music.

The recording features Gurrumul, in a world-first collaboration with the Sydney Symphony Orchestra, performing a collection of songs from his award-winning albums. Also included on the album are introductions from Gurrumul's family that provide a rare insight into the people, the country and the stories behind some of his most popular songs.

The album was released on 6 December 2013 and peaked at #48 on the ARIA album's chart.

At the AIR Awards of 2014, the album won Best Independent Classical Album.

== Reviews ==
Tyler McLoughlan from The Music gave the album 4 1/2 stars out of 5, saying; "Gurrumul has a habit of evoking an array of overwhelming emotions in a live setting that don't even exist in the toolbox of most performers" and "[it] is a thrilling piece of the live Gurrumul experience to take home".

== Track listing ==
No.	Title	Writer(s)	Performer/s	Length
1.	"Wiyathul"	Geoffrey Gurrumul Yunupingu	Gurrumul	6:35
2.	"Welcome and Introduction"		Michael Hohnen	1:21
3.	"Bapa"	Geoffrey Gurrumul Yunupingu	Gurrumul & Sydney Symphony Orchestra	2:48
4.	"Introduction to Djarimirri"		Susan Dhangal Gurruwiwi	0:44
5.	"Djarimirri"	Geoffrey Gurrumul Yunupingu	Gurrumul & Sydney Symphony Orchestra	3:45
6.	"Introduction to Djilawurr"		Johnny Gurrumgurrum Burrawanga	1:30
7.	"Djilawurr"	Geoffrey Gurrumul Yunupingu	Gurrumul & Sydney Symphony Orchestra	4:11
8.	"Introduction to Marwurrumburr"		Susan Dhangal Gurruwiwi	1:15
9.	"Marwurrumburr"	Geoffrey Gurrumul Yunupingu	Gurrumul & Sydney Symphony Orchestra	3:13
10.	"Introduction to Baru"		Michael Hohnen	2:02
11.	"Baru"	Geoffrey Gurrumul Yunupingu	Gurrumul & Sydney Symphony Orchestra	4:40
12.	"Introduction to Wukan"		Susan Dhangal Gurruwiwi	1:55
13.	"Wukan"	Geoffrey Gurrumul Yunupingu	Gurrumul & Sydney Symphony Orchestra	4:34
14.	"Gurrumul History (I Was Born Blind)"	Geoffrey Gurrumul Yunupingu	Gurrumul & Sydney Symphony Orchestra	6:35
15.	"Gathu Mawula"	Geoffrey Gurrumul Yunupingu	Gurrumul & Sydney Symphony Orchestra	4:47

== Awards ==
Australian Independent Record Labels Association Awards

Year	Nominee / work	Award	Result
2014	"His Life and Music"	Best Independent Classical Album	Won

Australian Recording Industry Association Awards

Year	Nominee / work	Award	Result
2014	"His Life and Music"	Best Male Artist	Nominated
2014	"His Life and Music"	Best Original Soundtrack/Cast/Show Album	Won

== Charts ==
=== Weekly charts ===
Chart (2013)	Peak position
Australian Albums (ARIA)	48
