= Shea Lolin =

British conductor, musician and media creative

Shea Lolin (born Newport 11 January 1983) is a British conductor, musician and media creative.

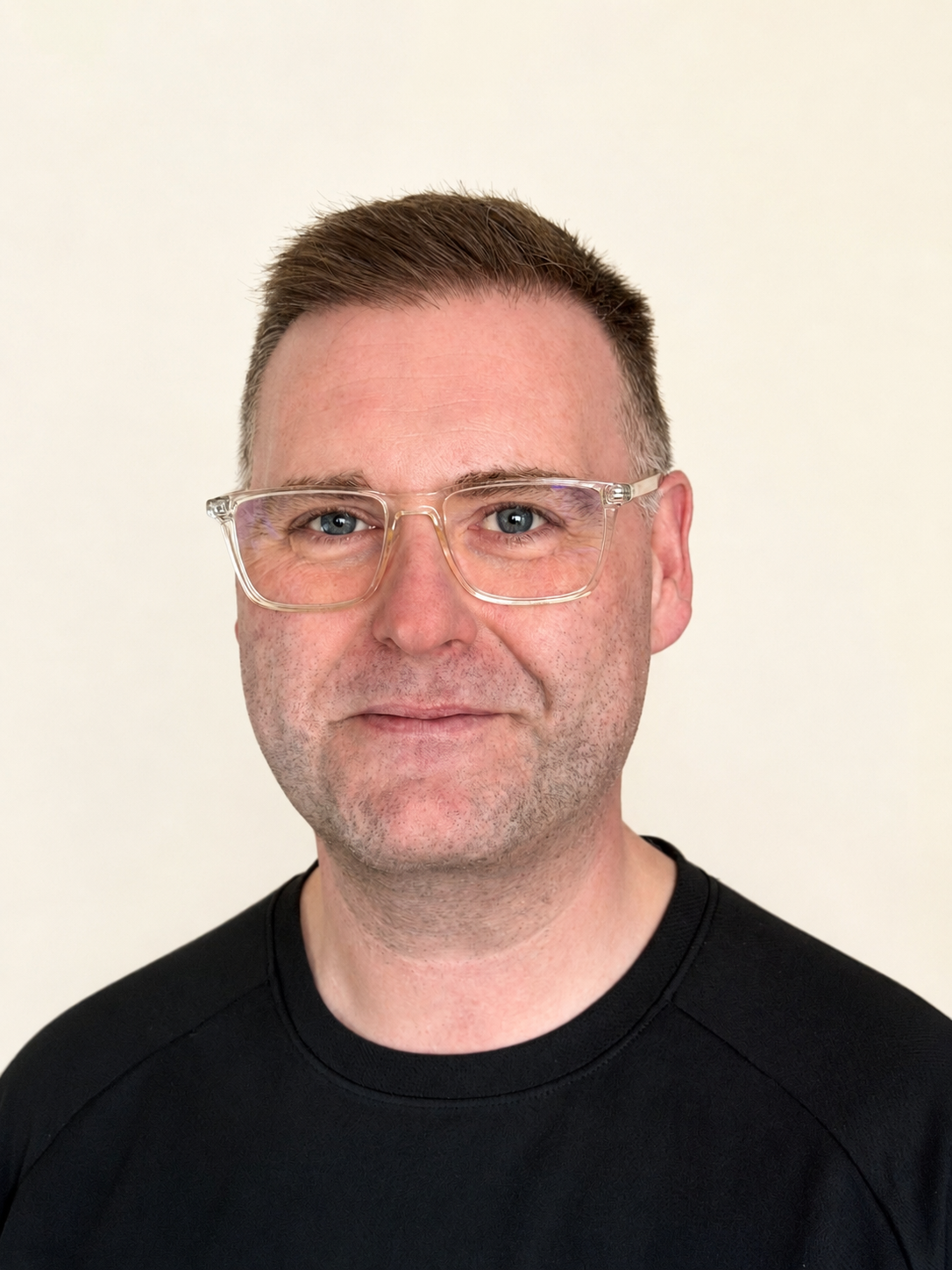
Shea Lolin, July 2026

== Biography ==
Lolin was educated at The Palmer Catholic Academy. He went on to study at the Colchester Institute Centre of Music and Performing Arts, where his teachers included Charles Hine (clarinet), Francis Reneau (piano), Eric Christopher Phelps (conducting) and Alan Bullard (composition). Whilst at the Colchester Institute, Lolin won several awards including the John Myatt Cup for Solo Woodwind.

He has held conducting and artistic roles with ensembles including the Bloomsbury Woodwind Ensemble and the City Wind Orchestra, with a particular focus on developing wind music repertoire and programming contemporary works alongside established literature for woodwind orchestra and wind orchestra.

Lolin has also conducted and recorded extensively in the Czech Republic, including with the Czech Philharmonic, Janáček Philharmonic and the Prague Metropolitan Orchestra. These collaborations have formed part of his work on recording projects focused on expanding the repertoire for woodwind orchestra and other wind ensembles alongside core orchestral repertoire.

In 2023, Lolin’s work with Czech orchestral musicians was recognised by the Czech Centre in London, where the launch of Chromosphere took place at the embassy.

In 2026, Lolin was appointed to the international jury for the European Championship for Wind Orchestras (ECWO) in Stuttgart, Germany, serving on the international jury alongside Frank Elbert and Isabelle Ruf-Weber.

== Recordings ==
In 2024, Lolin founded an orchestral production company, with Sony Classical among its early clients. His recording work has included orchestral repertoire such as music by Louise Farrenc with the Prague Metropolitan Orchestra, alongside projects for composers and library music for synchronisation catalogues.

In 2026, Lolin released Frisson, his third album of music for woodwind orchestra with the Czech Philharmonic Wind Ensemble. The album received editorial playlist support from Spotify, Apple Music, Deezer, Qobuz and HighResAudio, and has since accumulated more than 100,000 combined streams worldwide. It also received extensive international radio airplay, with over 800 documented broadcasts across Europe, North America and Australasia, including RTÉ Lyric FM’s Album of the Weekend in Ireland, ABC Classic in Australia, and a featured broadcast on Primo Movimento on RAI 3 in Italy. Frisson received favourable reviews from critics, with BBC Music Magazine praising its "lightness and excitement", Gramophone describing it as "a marvellous collection of music". and reviewers in Fanfare Magazine, American Record Guide, MusicWeb International and Pizzicato also commending Lolin's arrangements and the performances of the Czech Philharmonic Wind Ensemble. On 23 February 2026, Lolin and flautist Fiona Sweeney appeared on the Chords & Queens podcast to discuss the recording and the role of women in classical music.

On 9 October 2026, Lolin conducted the Prague Metropolitan Orchestra at Studio Martínek in Prague in a recording of Antony Gray's reconstruction of Francis Poulenc's score for the 1944 film Le Voyageur sans bagage. Lolin also edited and prepared the score.

== Leadership roles in voluntary music organisations ==
Lolin has been involved in leadership roles in voluntary organisations in the United Kingdom. He is currently the Chair of British Association of Symphonic Bands and Wind Ensembles

From 2013-2017, Lolin was Executive Director of the Clarinet and Saxophone Society of Great Britain (CASSGB) and notably during CASSGB's 40th Anniversary Year, leading a single reed day at Guildhall School of Music and Drama.

From 2012 to 2014, Lolin served as Secretary of the British Music Society, contributing to the administration and coordination of the organisation’s activities and publications during this period.

== Media production ==
Lolin’s media production work is closely connected to his wider musical projects, encompassing video production, live broadcast, and graphic design for classical and organ-related repertoire.

=== Video production & live broadcasting ===
He has worked with the Global Organ Group on a number of filmed organ projects, including video production work associated with Makin Organs. These projects have involved collaboration with organists and performers including Professor Graham Tracey DL and Shean Bowers.

Lolin produced a short film in 2020 to accompany the recording of The Eleanor Crosses by British composer Martin Ellerby, performed by the Royal Liverpool Philharmonic Orchestra. The work, inspired by the twelve monuments commissioned by King Edward I in memory of his wife Eleanor of Castile in 1290, traces the historic route from Harby in Leicestershire to Westminster Abbey in London. The musical score, composed in 2018, was recorded with the Royal Liverpool Philharmonic Orchestra, and Lolin’s film incorporates drone footage of key monument sites including Lincoln Cathedral, St Albans Cathedral, Charing Cross, and Westminster Abbey, providing a visual counterpart to the musical narrative.

Lolin has also contributed to filmed organ performance content for Viscount Organs, including a live broadcast concert featuring Jonathan Kingston.

In addition, he has undertaken media production work for Eminent UK, the UK dealership of Eminent supporting the creation and presentation of digital and filmed organ-related content.

On 15 December 2025, Shea Lolin produced the live broadcast of The Right Reverend Thomas McMahon’s Requiem Mass at Brentwood Cathedral, with over 5,000 viewers watching the service live from 26 countries around the world.

=== Graphic design ===
Lolin designed and produced The Diocese of Brentwood: 100 Years in Pictures, a major commemorative publication marking the centenary of the Diocese of Brentwood, which presents a pictorial historical record of the Diocese.

== Author ==
Shea Lolin is the author of two publications relating to music history and cultural heritage.

His publication The Complete Wind Music of Gustav Theodore Holst is based on an exhibition curated in summer 2012 at Morley College, London. The exhibition focused on the thirteen works for wind instruments composed by Gustav Holst, spanning military band works, chamber music, brass band repertoire, and arrangements of his own compositions. The publication brought together research material sourced from institutions including the BBC, the British Library, the Royal Academy of Music, and the Royal College of Music. It examines Holst’s wind music within the broader context of his career as both composer and educator.

Lolin is also the author of St Nicholas Industrial School and Chapel, which documents the history of the Manor House and St Nicholas’ Industrial School and Chapel in Manor Park, East London. The book examines the Victorian buildings on Gladding Road and their wider historical context, including their association with the Fry family, their use as an industrial school, their later occupation by the London Co-operative Society, and their eventual conversion into residential use. The publication includes over fifty archival photographs and provides a historical survey of the seven-acre site around Gladding, Whitta, and Capel Roads.

In addition to his books, Lolin writes a monthly curated music blog entitled Classical Explorations, published on his official website. The series presents a regularly updated selection of classical music recordings accompanied by commentary and contextual notes, covering repertoire from early music through to contemporary works. The blog reflects his wider interests in performance practice, orchestral repertoire, and wind music.
