= Prague Metropolitan Orchestra =

Czech recording orchestra

- Orchestra
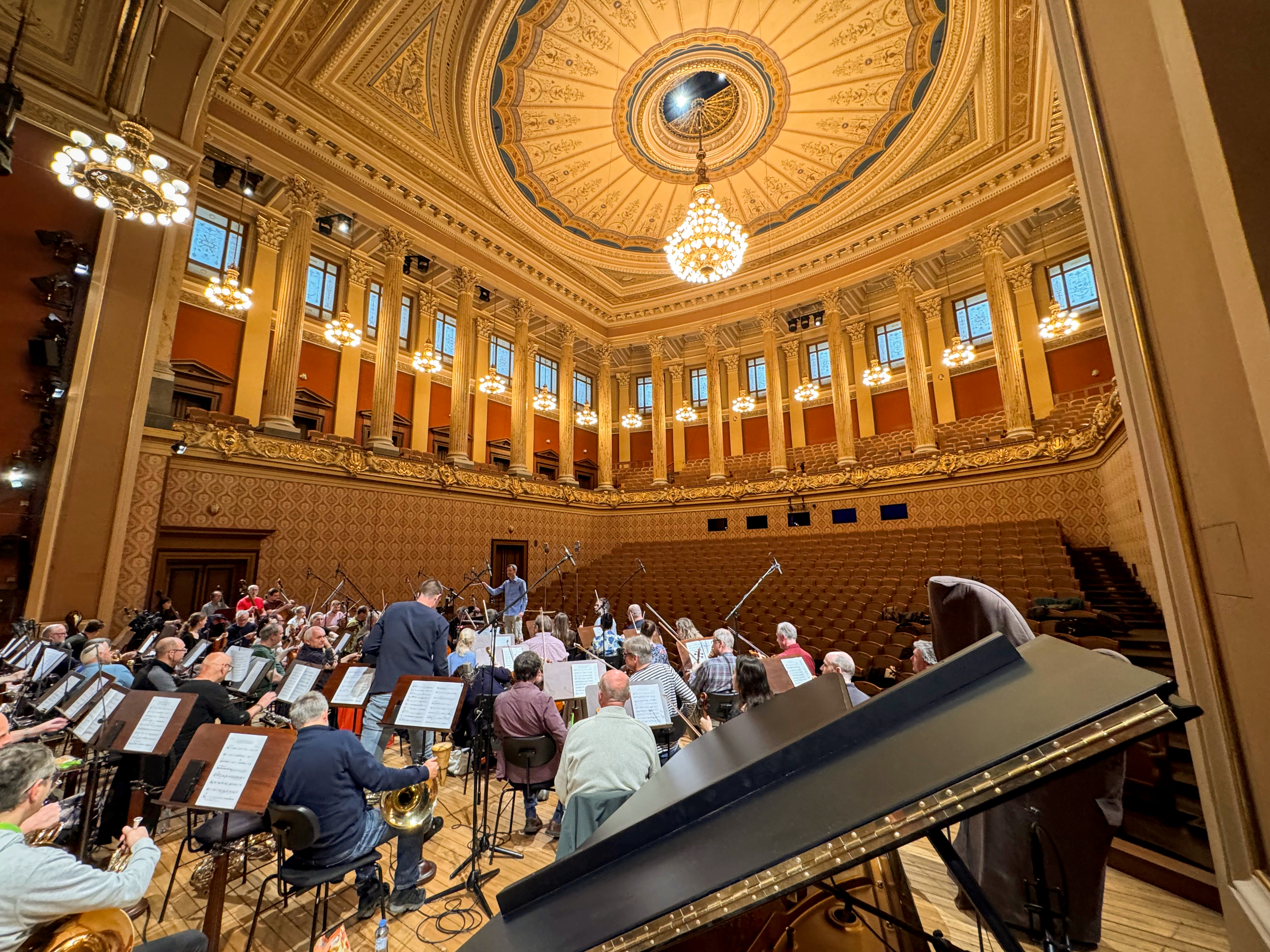
- The Prague Metropolitan Orchestra during a recording session in Dvořák Hall, May 2026.
- Founded: 2002
- Location: Prague, Czech Republic

The Prague Metropolitan Orchestra (Czech: Pražský Metropolitní Orchestr) is a Czech recording orchestra based in Prague, founded in 2002. The orchestra specialises in orchestral recording for classical albums, film and television productions, and commercial music projects, and has collaborated with international artists, composers and record labels including Naxos and Sony Classical.

== History ==
The orchestra was founded in 2002 with the vision of creating an ensemble specialising in recording soundtracks for motion pictures.

The members of the orchestra are selected players from major Prague-based symphony and opera orchestras including the Czech Philharmonic, the Prague Radio Symphony Orchestra, the Prague Symphony Orchestra and the National Theatre Orchestra.

The orchestra collaborates with composers, producers, and international artists across a wide range of genres, including orchestral, contemporary, and media music.

Alongside its film and television work, the orchestra records contemporary art music, including Alexander Rahbari's My Mother Persia symphonic poems for Naxos.

== Notable recordings and productions ==
The Prague Metropolitan Orchestra has recorded in several leading studios in Prague, including Czech Radio studios, Czech Television studios, Smečky Music Studios, CNSO Recording Studios, and Studio Martínek.

On 9 October 2026, the orchestra recorded Antony Gray's reconstruction of Francis Poulenc's score for the 1944 film Le Voyageur sans bagage at Studio Martínek in Prague, conducted by Shea Lolin. Lolin edited and prepared the score, which was used by exclusive permission of the Estate of Francis Poulenc.

In 2025, the Prague Metropolitan Orchestra recorded the official audio logo for the Associated Board of the Royal Schools of Music, the global music education charity. The recording was made at the Smečky Music Studios following an international Audio Logo Competition.

A major recording project conducted by Shea Lolin for Sony Classical was produced to mark International Women's Day 2025. The recordings, featuring orchestral works by Louise Farrenc, were included on the Spotify editorial playlist Women of Classical. The recordings have also received multiple broadcasts on BBC Radio 3.

Banbirrngu – The Orchestral Sessions is the second posthumous album by Geoffrey Gurrumul Yunupingu. Recorded under the direction of Jan Chalupecký and produced by Michael Hohnen, the album presents new orchestral arrangements of songs from across Gurrumul's career.

The orchestra has contributed to classical releases including the Symphonic Poems by Alexander Rahbari on Naxos Records in 2019, and has been involved in a variety of contemporary and crossover projects, including collaborations with Emika.

== Film and television work ==
The orchestra has performed on a range of film and television soundtracks, including:

- Starbright (2026)
- Dangerous Liaisons
- The Painted Bird (Nabarvené ptáče)
- Leviathan
- The Musketeers (BBC)
- Attraction
- Milada
- Marguerite
- De l'autre côté de la mer
