= Gawurra =

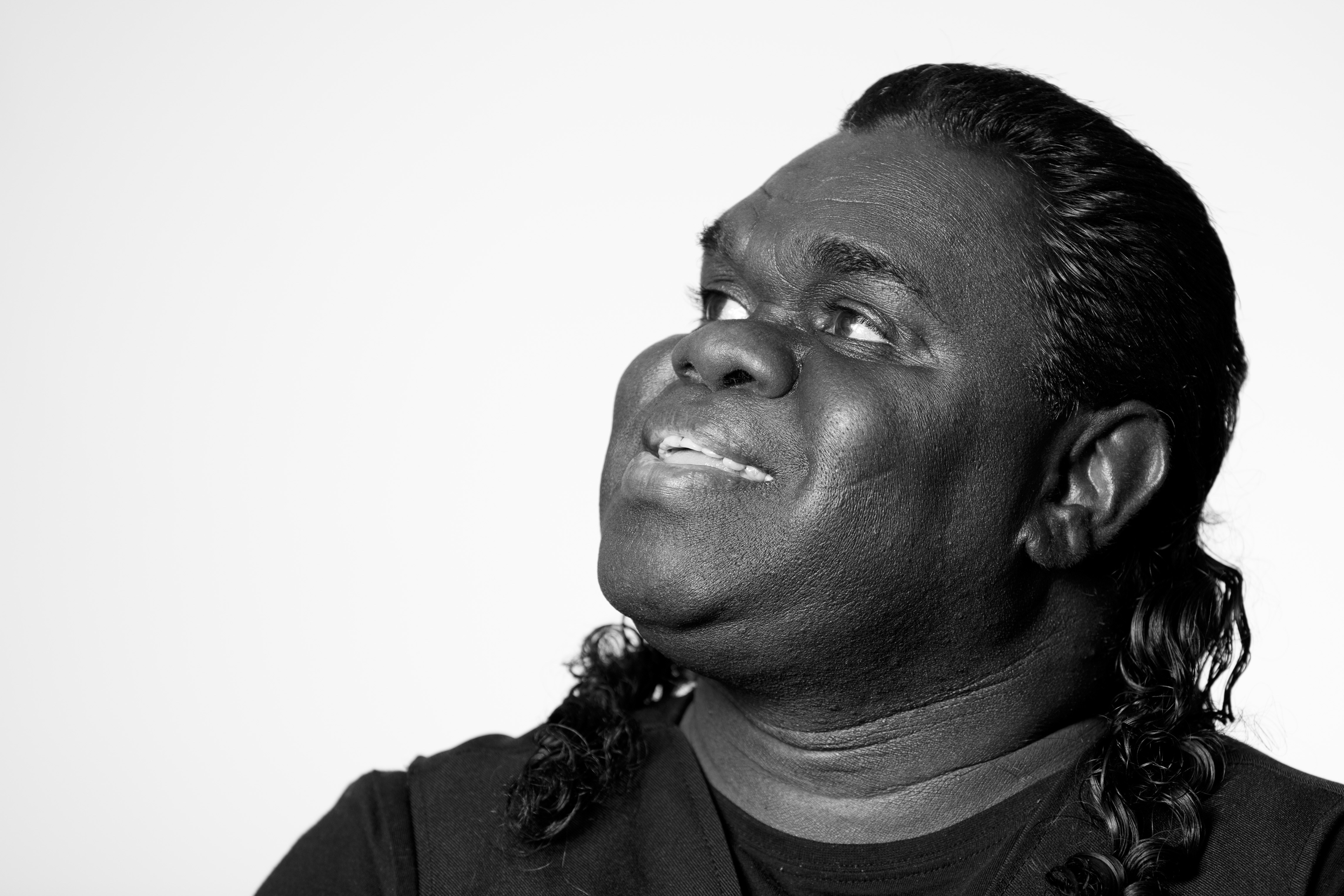

Stanley Gawurra Gaykamangu, known mononymously as Gawurra, is an Australian singer-songwriter hailing from Milingimbi, North East Arnhem. He sings in the Gupapuyngu language.

His debut album Ratja Yaliyali (which means "vine of love") is a collection of songs inspired by the traditional songlines of his hometown. The album was recorded at CAAMA Music in Alice Springs, Australia.

At the 2016 National Indigenous Music Awards, Ratja Yaliyali received awards for Album of the Year and New Talent of the Year. The album also received awards for Cover Art and Film Clip. It was nominated for Best World Music Album at the 2016 ARIA Awards.

== Discography ==
=== Albums ===
Title	Details	Peak positions
Title	Details	AUS
Ratja Yaliyali	Released: 2016; Label: CAAMA Music (9324399100235); Formats: 2×CD	—

== Awards and nominations ==
=== ARIA Music Awards ===
The ARIA Music Awards is an annual awards ceremony that recognises excellence, innovation, and achievement across all genres of Australian music. They commenced in 1987.

Year	Nominee / work	Award	Result	Ref.
2016	Ratja Yaliyali	Best World Music Album	Nominated	

=== National Indigenous Music Awards ===
The National Indigenous Music Awards recognise excellence, innovation and leadership among Aboriginal and Torres Strait Islander musicians from throughout Australia. They commenced in 2004.

Year	Nominee / work	Award	Result	Ref.
2016	Gawurra	New Talent of the Year	Won	
2016	Ratja Yaliyali	Album of the Year	Won	
2016	Ratja Yaliyali	Cover Art of the Year	Won	
2016	"Ratja Yaliyali"	Film Clip of the Year	Won	
2016	"Ratja Yaliyali"	Song of the Year	Nominated	
