= Woodwind section =

Section of orchestra or concert band

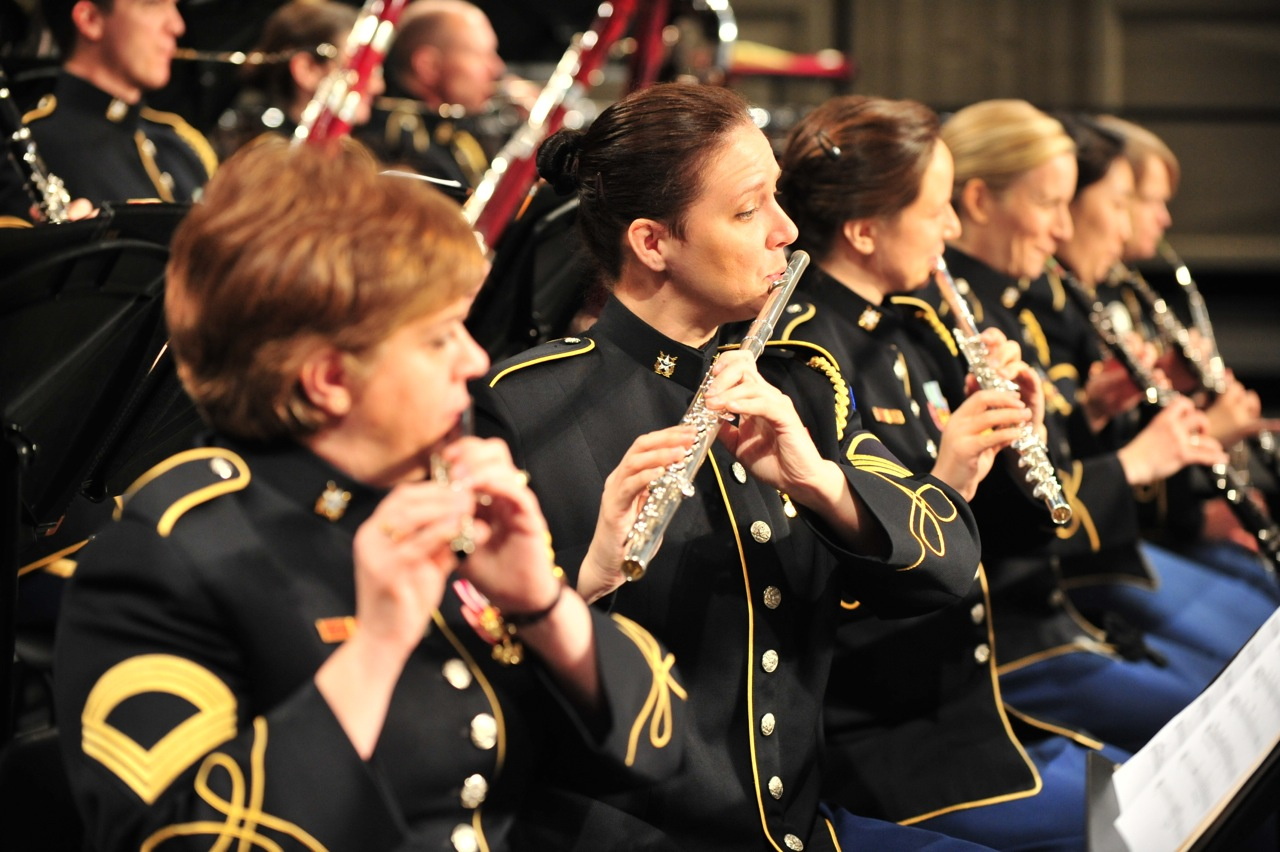
The woodwind section of the United States Army Band

The woodwind section, which consists of woodwind instruments, is one of the main sections of an orchestra or concert band. Woodwind sections contain instruments given Hornbostel-Sachs classifications of 421 (edge-blown aerophones, commonly known as flutes) and 422 (reed aerophones), but exclude 423 (brass instruments, which have their own section.)

== Orchestra ==
The woodwind section of a symphony orchestra typically includes flutes (sometimes with one doubling piccolo), oboes (sometimes with one doubling cor anglais), clarinets (sometimes with one doubling bass clarinet and/or another doubling E♭ clarinet), and bassoons (sometimes with one doubling contrabassoon). In the early part of the 20th century the woodwinds (as well as other sections) were often considerably expanded. For example, Mahler in his Symphony No. 8 (1910) employs 2 piccolos, 4 flutes, 4 oboes, cor anglais, 2 E♭ clarinets, 3 B♭ clarinets, bass clarinet, 4 bassoons, and contrabassoon. After World War I, the number of instruments was often reduced, approaching the size of a chamber orchestra, with individual instrument combinations differing for each composition. The change can be illustrated by comparing two works by Stravinsky: The Rite of Spring (1911–1913) with a large woodwinds section similar to the above and his Histoire du soldat (1918), which only utilizes one clarinet and one bassoon.

The woodwind section of the orchestra today usually consists of:

- Two to four flutes
- Two to four oboes
- Two or three clarinets
- Two or three bassoons

For early classical music, the clarinets may be omitted. The principal flutist is traditionally the section leader. The evolution of this section can be seen over Mozart's Symphonies. When emulating the classical style, Sergei Prokofiev used the above combination in his First Symphony.

The woodwind section of the orchestra frequently also includes one or more of the following, in typical score order:

- Piccolo (often played by the second, third or fourth flute)
- Cor anglais (often played by an oboist but commonly by a specialist cor anglais player)
- E♭ clarinet (usually played by the second or third clarinetist)
- Bass clarinet (often played by a clarinetist but commonly by a specialist bass clarinetist)
- Contrabassoon (usually played by the second or third bassoonist)

Less commonly used, in typical score order, are:

- Alto flute (usually played by a flautist)
- Bass flute (usually played by a flautist)
- Oboe d'amore (usually played by an oboist)
- Bass oboe or Heckelphone (often played by an oboist but sometimes by a bassoonist)
- Basset horn (usually played by a clarinetist)
- Contrabass clarinet (usually played by a clarinetist)
- Soprano, Alto, Tenor or Baritone saxophones (sometimes played by a clarinetist, but more often by a dedicated soloist)

== Concert band ==
The woodwind section of the concert band is generally much larger than the woodwind section of the orchestra. Also, the concert band generally has a larger variety of woodwind instruments than the orchestra.

The woodwind section of the concert band commonly contains, in normal score order:

- Piccolo(s)
- Flutes
- Oboes
- Bassoons
- B♭ clarinets
- Bass clarinet(s)
- Alto saxophones
- Tenor saxophone(s)
- Baritone saxophone(s)

Other woodwinds that are used in the concert band, but not as frequently as the ones listed above, in normal score order:

- Cor anglais (usually played by an oboist)
- Contrabassoon (usually played by a bassoonist)
- E♭ clarinet (usually played by a B♭ clarinetist)
- Alto clarinet or basset horn (usually played by a B♭ or bass clarinetist)
- Contra-alto clarinet or contrabass clarinet (usually played by a bass clarinetist)
- Soprano saxophone (usually played by the principal alto saxophonist)

Woodwinds that are sometimes, but very rarely, used in the concert band:

- Alto and bass flutes
- Bass saxophone

== Woodwind choir ==
A woodwind choir, also called woodwind orchestra, or woodwind ensemble is a performing ensemble consisting exclusively of members of the woodwind family of instruments. It typically includes flutes, oboes, clarinets, bassoons and saxophones, all of varying sizes. The woodwind orchestra has a small repertoire of original music written especially for the ensemble and arrangements of orchestral compositions, light music, and popular tunes.

=== History of the woodwind choir ===
Civic wind groups in the United Kingdom can be traced back to medieval times. The father of English literature Geoffrey Chaucer wrote in his poem House of Fame:

"Then I saw standing behind them, far away and all by themselves, many scores of thousands, who made loud minstrelsy with bagpipes and shawms and many other kinds of pipes, and skilfully played both them of clear and them of reedy sound, such as be played at feasts with the roast-meat, and many a flute and lilting-horn and pipes make of green stalks, such as these little shepherd-lads have who watch over beasts in the broom."

Wind music flourished in the courts of Europe. Henry VIII celebrated his coronation in 1509, which included three days of entertainment, with performances from several wind groups. In 1749 Handel's Music for the Royal Fireworks was performed as a piece for winds after King George II ordered Handel to remove the string parts.

Harmoniemusik played an equally important role in the eighteenth century for open-air and important social occasions. Together with the string quartet, the ensemble and genre most typifies the Classical era. In 1782, Joseph II, Holy Roman Emperor, founded his Imperial Wind Ensemble in Vienna. Harmoniemusik had an important influence on the development of the symphony orchestra. Mozart and Beethoven became more daring in the way they wrote for the wind sections in their symphonic works. Anton Reicha and Franz Danzi were two pioneering composers of the wind quintet but by the end of the nineteenth century, interest in this ensemble began to fade.

It was around this time that the concert band became an important vehicle for composers to advertise their operas and orchestral works. Rossini, Liszt and Wagner appointed bandmasters to arrange their works to be performed to the masses at bandstand events. Holst, Vaughan Williams and Grainger began writing original works for the concert band at the turn of the twentieth century. These works were the seeds which grew into the now extensive body of repertoire which exists for the medium. Further into the twentieth century came a renewed interest in the wind quintet. Many leading contemporary composers have produced wind quintets which have become standard chamber repertoire.

=== Original music for woodwind choir ===
- Ernest Bloch (1880–1959) Prelude and March (for woodwind choir)
- Alan Bullard (born 1947) Journey Through Time (2010)
- Gary Carpenter Pantomime (2005)
- Martin Ellerby (born 1957) Sinfonia Aqua (2015)
- Adam Gorb (born 1958) Battle Symphony, Op.26 (1997)
- Adam Gorb (born 1958) Suite for Winds (1995)
- Patrick Glenn Harper (born 1977) Excursion for Woodwind Ensemble (2006), Three Sketches for Woodwind Ensemble (2016)
- Christopher Hussey (born 1974) Dreamtide (2012)
- Christopher Hussey (born 1974) Twisted Skyscape (2008)
- Shea Lolin (born 1983) Lux Aeterna (2014) and The Infernal Train (2020)
- Hamilton G. McLean Promenade for Woodwind Choir
- Philip Sparke (born 1951) Overture for Woodwinds (1999)
- Josef Tal (1910-2008) Wind Quintet (1966)
- Jeffery Wilson (born 1957) Postcards: Play, Sing, Dance (2012)
- Ruth Young The Zoo Keeper (2006)

Twisted Skyscape, a recording of a woodwind choir, was made with the Czech Philharmonic Wind Ensemble, conducted by Shea Lolin in 2014.

Chromosphere: Symphonic Colours of the Woodwind Orchestra, a recording of a woodwind orchestra, was released by Divine Art in 2024, featuring the Czech Philharmonic Wind Ensemble conducted by Shea Lolin.

Frisson, a recording of music for woodwind orchestra, was released by Divine Art in 2026, featuring the Czech Philharmonic Wind Ensemble with flautist Fiona Sweeney, conducted by Shea Lolin.

== See also ==
- String section
- Percussion section
- Brass section
- Keyboard section
