= Martin Ellerby =

English composer

Martin Ellerby (1957, Worksop, Nottinghamshire, England) is an English composer. He was educated at the Royal College of Music, London, where he was taught by Joseph Horovitz.

His catalogue features works for orchestra, chorus, concert band, brass band, ballet and various instrumental ensembles. Performances include the BBC Proms, the Leipzig Gewandhaus and many international festivals. Among his students was Daniel Giorgetti.

Ellerby's 2007 piece Elgar Variations, honoring British composer Sir Edward Elgar, was used as the test piece for the Championship section of the 2013 North American Brass Band Association competition.

== Works ==
- Paris Sketches (1994) for wind orchestra
- Elgar Variations (2007) for Brass Band
- Sinfonia Aqua (2015) for woodwind orchestra. Commissioned by Shea Lolin and the Bloomsbury Woodwind Ensemble and premiered at St John's, Waterloo on 28 November 2015.
- Terra Australis (2005) for Brass Band
