= Djarimirri =

Studio album by Geoffrey Gurrumul Yunupingu
- Released: 13 April 2018
- Genre: World; Aboriginal; classical crossover
- Length: 70:45
- Language: Dhangu; Dhuwal
- Label: Skinnyfish Music

Geoffrey Gurrumul Yunupingu chronology
The Gospel Album (2015)	Djarimirri (2018)	The Gurrumul Story (2021)

Djarimirri (subtitled Child of the Rainbow) is the first posthumous album and fourth studio album from Geoffrey Gurrumul Yunupingu. The album was completed just weeks before his death in July 2017 and presents traditional songs and harmonised chants from his traditional Yolngu life with orchestral arrangements. The album was released on 13 April 2018 and debuted at number one on the ARIA Charts, becoming Yunupingu's first number-one album. It is also the first time an Australian indigenous-language album has peaked at number one, and he is only the second Aboriginal artist to have a number-one album, following Jessica Mauboy's The Secret Daughter: Songs from the Original TV Series in October 2016.

Skinnyfish Music producer Michael Hohnen said, "It's such an unlikely record to go number one. No beats, no programming, no pop formulas. It's just kind of like the opposite of what you would expect but it's an incredibly honest record and something that we've spent so long making and been really passionate about."

At the ARIA Music Awards of 2018, Djarimirri was nominated for seven awards, winning four: Best Male Artist, Best Independent Release, Best World Music Album and Best Cover Art.

At the National Indigenous Music Awards of 2018, Djarimirri won Album of the Year and the title track won Song of the Year.

At the 2019 Australian Independent Awards, Djarimirri won Best Independent Album or EP.

== Background and release ==
Geoffrey Gurrumul Yunupingu is the highest-selling Indigenous musician of all time, having released three top-five albums since 2008. Long-time musical collaborator and friend Michael Hohnen said:

"Last year, we sat and listened to these recordings over and over again, from beginning to end and piece by piece, pulling them apart and putting them back together until all elements shone. We had finished the incredible process, preparing to release it and then we lost him."

He added:

"He was immensely proud of what we achieved on this album, and it is an emotional experience for all of us to present this final, enormous chapter in his story with this musical statement."

== Reception ==
Zoë Radas from JB Hi-Fi's Stack Magazine described the album as "totally spellbinding", saying "Gurrumul's voice – renowned for its clarity and depth – soars solo and in dual harmonies alongside orchestral accompaniments (primarily deep strings, timpani, brass and mallet percussion) which mimic the way a didgeridoo's circular inflections comb through its drone of sound. The resulting rhythms, complex and conflicting, are always in orbit around the command of Gurrumul's voice."

Bruce Elder from The Sydney Morning Herald said the album is "a unique and hugely significant contribution to Australian music."

Guido Farnell from The Music AU gave the album 4.5 out of 5 said it "feels instantly classic and destined to become an iconic Aussie album", adding, "Such a fully formed and joyous album released posthumously makes for truly bittersweet listening".

Paul Barr from Readings called the album a "remarkable achievement" and described it as "A perfect fusion of traditional and modern, Gurrumul's unique voice evokes a contemplative mood in the listener and connects to Yolngu culture. The brilliant rhythmic arrangements are hypnotic and heighten the effect."

== Track listing ==
1. "Waak (Crow)" – 5:08
2. "Galiku (Flag)" – 5:01
3. "Ngarrpiya (Octopus)" – 6:09
4. "Djarimirri (Child of the Rainbow)" – 5:08
5. "Djolin (Musical Instrument)" – 5:56
6. "Marrayarr (Flag)" – 7:42
7. "Gapu (Freshwater)" – 5:21
8. "Djilawurr (Scrubfowl)" – 5:04
9. "Baru (Saltwater Crocodile)" – 5:50
10. "Gopuru (Tuna Swimming)" – 6:34
11. "Djapana (Sunset)" – 5:08
12. "Wulminda (Dark Clouds)" – 7:56

== Charts ==
=== Weekly charts ===
Chart (2018)	Peak position
Australian Albums (ARIA)	1

=== Year-end charts ===
Chart (2018)	Position
Australian Albums (ARIA)	78

== Release history ==
List of release dates, showing formats, label, catalogue and reference
Region	Date	Format(s)	Label	Catalogue	Ref.
Australia	13 April 2018	CD, digital download, streaming	Skinnyfish Music	SFGU180413	
Australia	6 July 2018	Vinyl	Skinnyfish Music	SFGU180614	

== See also ==
- List of number-one albums of 2018 (Australia)
