= Dewayne Everettsmith =

Australian singer

Dewayne Everettsmith is an Australian singer based in Hobart, Tasmania. He is known for singing in the Tasmanian language Palawa kani.

== Career ==
In 2009, Everettsmith performed as part of The Black Arm Band

In 2012, his song "It's Like Love" with Jasmine Beams was featured in a Tourism Australia advertising campaign.

Everettsmith released his debut album Surrender in 2014. The album includes the song "Melaythina", which is the first commercially available song sung in Palawa kani, a recently constructed Tasmanian language. In 2015 he performed alongside Briggs and Gurrumul on the update of Archie Roach's Charcoal Lane.

The 2025 project Palawa kani – songs and stories of lutruwita/Tasmania is a collaboration between Everettsmith, conductor/arranger Erkki Veltheim, Skinnyfish Music, and the Tasmanian Symphony Orchestra. It has been awarded government funding in the first round of the Creative Futures Fund by Creative Australia. It is the first major musical work in palawa, and includes a studio recording as well as a regional tour, and educational resources for schools.

== Discography ==
- Surrender (2014) - Skinnyfish
