= Bayini =

Song of the Yolngu Matha, Northern Territory, Australia

"Bayini" is 'spiritual love song' performed in Yolngu Matha, an indigenous language of Northern Australia. It is track three on Geoffrey Gurrumul Yunupingu's album, Rrakala, which was released by Skinnyfish Music on 15 April 2011.

== Meaning ==
According to the National Museum of Australia, "Bayini" are light-skinned mythological beings who were also involved in collecting and curing trepang (an edible sea cucumber). In literature, the first non-Aboriginal visitors to the Arnhem Land coast are referred to as Bayini. In songs that record and preserve their traditions, Aboriginal people of Arnhem land tell of the Bayini gypsies with copper coloured skin who visited their shores.

John Gratorex said in the Rrakala sleeve notes; "Yolngu are deep thinking philosophical people. The words in the song refer to many families sitting together on the beach looking to waves and sea, the horizon, contemplating. Long ago from over the horizon the Bayini came to Yolngu country."

== Gurrumul and Sarah Blasko version ==
"Bayini"

Single by Geoffrey Gurrumul Yunupingu & Sarah Blasko

from the album Rrakala (solo version)
- Released: 1 June 2012
- Recorded: 2012
- Genre: World music
- Length: 4:39 (original version); 4:40 (main version); 3:51 (radio edit)
- Label: Skinnyfish Music
- Songwriter: Geoffrey Gurrumul Yunupingu

Sarah Blasko singles chronology
| "We Won't Run" (2009) | "Bayini" (2012) | "I Awake" (2012) |

Music video
- "Bayini" on YouTube

On 1 June 2012, "Bayini" was re-recorded for radio release. The main version contained vocals from singer, Sarah Blasko, singing additional lyrics in English.

In July 2012, the song received unprecedented attention and began getting airplay on ABC radio and Triple J and Gurrumul's album, Rrakala, achieved platinum sales in Australia.

""You cannot help but be moved when you hear Gurrumul's voice, but to sing with him is another experience altogether. I must admit, I have been quite overwhelmed with emotion each time we have performed this song together and when I recorded my part. I don't think I was prepared for that. It's the combination of Gurrumul's voice and being invited into that very personal realm. To share in that is incredibly special. I am deeply affected each time I sing Bayini." "

— Sarah talking about singing 'Bayini'.

== Gurrumul and Delta Goodrem version ==
"Bayini"

Single by Geoffrey Gurrumul Yunupingu, Delta Goodrem and musicians of the Sydney Symphony
- Released: 31 May 2013
- Recorded: 2013
- Genre: World, pop
- Length: 3:19
- Label: Shine Australia
- Songwriter: Geoffrey Gurrumul Yunupingu

Delta Goodrem singles chronology
| "Wish You Were Here" (2012) | "Bayini" (2013) | "Heart Hypnotic" (2013) |

In 2013, Gurrumul joined Delta Goodrem and the Sydney Symphony Orchestra for a special performance of Bayini on The Voice Australia. The clip has had over 1,746,395 views on YouTube. Goodrem said of the performance; "Gurrumul is one of this country's greatest voices and to receive his invitation to perform on 'The Voice' was so special and something I will cherish forever." The performance was in celebration of National Reconciliation Week and following popular demand, the single was released on 31 May with proceeds of the single going towards the newly formed Gurrumul Yunupingu Foundation, which aims to help young people in indigenous communities realise their potential.

Despite peaking at number #1 on iTunes throughout the week, "Bayini" debuted at #4 on the ARIA singles chart, thus becoming Gurrumul's highest-charting single and Goodrem's 13th top 5 single.

== Charts ==
=== Weekly chart ===
| Chart (2013) | Peak position |
|---|---|
| ARIA Singles Chart | 4 |

=== Yearly chart ===
| Chart (2013) | Peak position |
|---|---|
| Australian Artists Singles Chart | 46 |
