= Saltwater Band =

Australian Indigenous band

- Origin: Galiwin'ku, Elcho Island, Australia
- Genres: Indigenous roots
- Label: Skinnyfish Music
- Members: Geoffrey Gurrumul Yunupingu; Manuel Nulupani Dhurrkay; Joshua Dhurrkay; Andrew Yunupingu; Barra'kuwuy Yunupingu; Jonathon Yunupingu; Adrian Garrawitja; Lloyd Garrawitja

Saltwater Band are an Indigenous roots band from Galiwin'ku on Elcho Island, around 560 kilometres from Darwin. The members are Yolngu and they sing mostly in Yolngu languages. Their songs are a mixture of traditional songs and reggae/ska influenced pop. One member of the band, the late Geoffrey Gurrumul Yunupingu, is a close relative of Mandawuy Yunupingu of Yothu Yindi and was a past member of Yothu Yindi.

Saltwater Band's first album, Gapu Damurrun, sold more than 10,000 copies, a then record for an independent Northern Territory act. Their album Djarridjarri was nominated for the ARIA Award for Best World Music Album at the ARIA Music Awards of 2004. The album also received a Deadly Award for Album Release of the Year.

== Discography ==
Title	Details
Gapu Damurrun	Released: 1999; Label: Skinny Fish (SB 001); Format: CD
Djarridjarri	Released: 2004; Label: Skinny Fish (SFSW040102); Format: CD
Malk	Released: 2009; Label: Skinny Fish (SFSW100904); Format: CD digital download

== Awards and nominations ==
=== APRA Awards ===
The APRA Awards are presented annually from 1982 by the Australasian Performing Right Association (APRA), "honouring composers and songwriters".

Year	Nominee / work	Award	Result
2012	"Compass" (Charlie Yunupingu, David Yunupingu)	Blues & Roots Work of the Year	Nominated

=== ARIA Music Awards ===
The ARIA Music Awards is an annual awards ceremony that recognises excellence, innovation, and achievement across all genres of Australian music.

Year	Nominee / work	Award	Result
2004	Djarridjarri: Blue Flag	Best World Music Album	Nominated
2011	Malk	Best World Music Album	Nominated

=== The Deadly Awards ===
The Deadly Awards, commonly known simply as The Deadlys, was an annual celebration of Australian Aboriginal and Torres Strait Islander achievement in music, sport, entertainment and community. They ran from 1996 to 2013.

Year	Nominee / work	Award	Result
2004	Djarridjarri	Album of the Year	Won
2009	themselves	Band of the Year	Won

=== National Indigenous Music Awards ===
The National Indigenous Music Awards recognise excellence, innovation and leadership among Aboriginal and Torres Strait Islander musicians from throughout Australia. They commenced in 2004.

Year	Nominee / work	Award	Result
2004	themselves	People's Choice Award	Won
2005	themselves	People's Choice Award	Won
2008	Saltwater Band Live	DVD/Film Clip of the Year	Won
2011	Malk	Album of the Year	Nominated
2026	Saltwater Band	Hall of Fame	inducted
