= Rrakala =

Studio album by Geoffrey Gurrumul Yunupingu
- Released: 15 April 2011
- Recorded: New York
- Genre: Folk, world, Aboriginal
- Length: 64:23
- Label: Skinnyfish Music

Geoffrey Gurrumul Yunupingu chronology
Live in Darwin, Australia (2010)	Rrakala (2011)	His Life and Music (2013)

Rrakala is the second album from Geoffrey Gurrumul Yunupingu. It is performed in Yolngu. Gurrumul plays piano, drums, nylon-string acoustic guitar, electric and acoustic guitars.

It reached number three on the ARIA charts.

At the 2011 ARIA awards, Rrakala won the award for Best World Music Album. It was also nominated for album of the year, Best Male Artist, Best Independent Release and Best Cover Artist. Gurrumul performed a version of "Warwu" with Missy Higgins at the award ceremony.

== Reception ==
The ABC reviewed the album, judging: "While Gurrumul won the hearts of the world with his debut album Gurrumul back in 2008, in his latest full-length Rrakala he cements his place in the world as a unique voice, gifted, and arguably, one of the most important Indigenous Australians of our time."

Iain Shedden of The Australian gave the album 4 of out 5 stars, saying "Central to all 12 tracks is Gurrumul's astonishing voice. It's an instrument of rare power and beauty; seductive, sometimes sweet, but with a rasp to it in places. All of the lyrics are of a spiritual nature, focused entirely on the culture of his homeland, Elcho Island in northeast Arnhem Land, whether it be in the spirits of ancestors (Baru) or in the sheer beauty and tranquillity of the land (Mala Rrakpala, Gopuru)". He also felt that "Rrakala's limited instrumentation makes it a tad one-dimensional. Nevertheless, it's one hell of a dimension."

Bruce Elder from The Sydney Morning Herald reviewed the album favourably, commenting "This is music for the ages [...] He is, for every urban Aborigine grappling with their identity, a reminder of the richness of the traditional, pre-European culture that was once their heritage and which has been slowly leached away during the past 200 years. If you listen very carefully to Gurrumul, you can lose yourself in the timelessness and ancient beauty that effortlessly swirls and drifts around every note he plays and sings."

Robin Denselow from The Guardian gave the album 3 out of 5 and wrote: "Gurrumul Yunupingu is a world music phenomenon [...] His lyrics may deal with his homeland, nature and contemplation, but his gently epic melodies have echoes of western folk, gospel, soul and reggae". He had some criticisms however, remarking " ...too many follow the same style, despite the addition of a female soul chorus and reggae guitar. It's time he began to show what else he can do".

== Track listing ==
The album had 12 tracks, the same number as its predecessor Gurrumul. All tracks were written by Geoffrey Gurrumul Yunupingu.

No.	Title	Length
1.	"Gopuru"	3:48
2.	"Mala Rrakala"	4:32
3.	"Bayini"	4:39
4.	"Baru"	5:04
5.	"Ya Yawirriny"	4:42
6.	"Djilawurr"	4:04
7.	"Warwu"	8:27
8.	"Djotarra"	6:43
9.	"Bakitju"	5:52
10.	"Djomula"	5:45
11.	"Wulminda"	5:37
12.	"Banbirrngu"	5:10
Total length:		64:23

== Charts ==
=== Weekly charts ===
Chart (2011)	Peak position
Australian Albums (ARIA)	3
Belgian Albums (Ultratop Flanders)	85
Swiss Albums (Schweizer Hitparade)	34

=== Year-end charts ===
Chart (2011)	Position
Australian (ARIA Charts)	30
Australian Artists (ARIA Charts)	6

== Certifications ==
Region	Certification	Certified units/sales
Australia (ARIA)	Platinum	70,000^{^}
^{^} Shipments figures based on certification alone.
