= Geoffrey Gurrumul Yunupingu =

Indigenous Australian musician

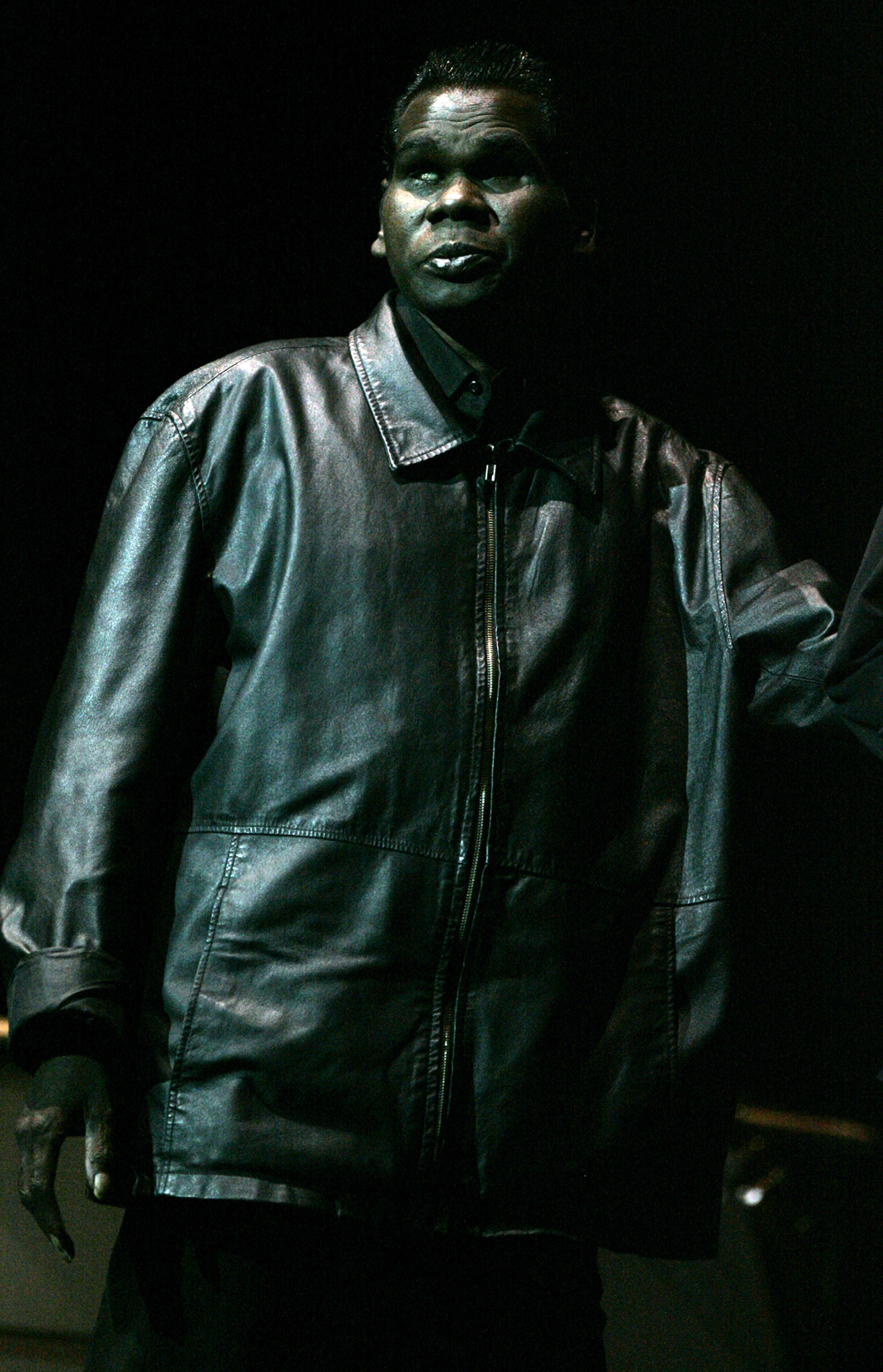
- Gurrumul in November 2012

Background information
- Born: 22 January 1971; Elcho Island, Northern Territory, Australia
- Died: 25 July 2017 (aged 46) Darwin, Northern Territory, Australia
- Genres: Folk; world
- Occupations: Singer; songwriter; musician
- Instruments: Vocals; guitar; drums; keyboards; didgeridoo
- Years active: 1986–2017
- Label: Skinnyfish Music
- Formerly of: Yothu Yindi; Saltwater Band
- Website: www.gurrumul.com

Geoffrey Gurrumul Yunupingu (22 January 1971 – 25 July 2017), commonly known as Gurrumul and also referred to since his death as Dr G. Yunupingu, (Note: Avoiding the use of a deceased person's first name is part of grieving practice among many Australian Aboriginal and Torres Strait Islander communities. Use of the title "Dr" is based on the honorary doctorate conferred in 2012 by the University of Sydney. While most universities do not endorse the use of "Dr" as a title for holders of honorary doctorates, the use of the title helps distinguish between Gurrumul and his uncle Mandawuy Yunupingu who was often referred to after his death as "Mr Yunupingu". This is also reflected in the obituary published in the New York Times, which refers to him as both Dr and Mr Yunupingu.) was a Yolŋu Aboriginal Australian musician. A multi-instrumentalist, he played drums, keyboards, guitar (a right-hand-strung guitar played left-handed) and didgeridoo, but is best known for the clarity of his singing voice. He sang stories of his land both in Yolŋu languages, such as Gaalpu, Gumatj, or Djambarrpuynu (related to Gumatj), and in English. He began his career as a member of Yothu Yindi and later Saltwater Band, and his solo career brought him wider acclaim; he was the most commercially successful Aboriginal Australian musician at the time of his death. As of 2020, it is estimated that Yunupingu has sold half a million records globally. Yunupingu performed for Queen Elizabeth II, US President Barack Obama, Prince Charles, Prince William and Catherine Middleton, and Crown Prince Frederik and Crown Princess Mary of Denmark. He was one of only two Australian performers at the Queen's Diamond Jubilee Concert at Buckingham Palace in 2012. At the 2026 ARIA Music Awards he will be inducted in the ARIA Hall of Fame.

== Life and career ==
=== 1971–1989: Early life ===
The first of four sons born to Ganyinurra (Daisy), of the Gumal clan, and Nyambi "Terry" Yunupingu, a Gumatj clansman, Yunupingu was born blind in Galiwin'ku, Elcho Island, in 1971, situated off the coast of Arnhem Land in northern Australia, about 530 kilometres (330 mi) east of Darwin. When he was four years old, he taught himself how to play a toy piano and an accordion. A year later he began to play a guitar; despite being a left-hander, he played a right-handed guitar, holding it upside down, which he would continue to do throughout his career. His friend, spokesperson, and collaborator Michael Hohnen described his early musical experiences as follows: "Gurrumul was educated by immersion, cultural immersion—from his aunties, parents and grandmothers, with love and lullabies; from his uncles, fathers and grandfathers through ceremony songs and storytelling, much of it through music. Throughout his childhood, he was built, given or bought tin cans, sticks, toy keyboards, piano accordions, nylon string guitars, and, later, clap sticks (bilma) and didgeridoos (yidaki). He learned foot stomping calling and whooping, vocalisations of traditional songs and their different sounds, and so much more." He later sang hymns in the mission choir and also enjoyed Western pop music, particularly Dire Straits, Cliff Richard, and Stevie Wonder. An adventurous child, he was taught how to play basketball and ride a push-bike around his community. He left school at the age of 12, having attended his local school, Shepherdson College, along with a brief stint at an institute in the Victorian city of Geelong for instruction in Braille, which did not interest him.

=== 1989–2017: Career ===
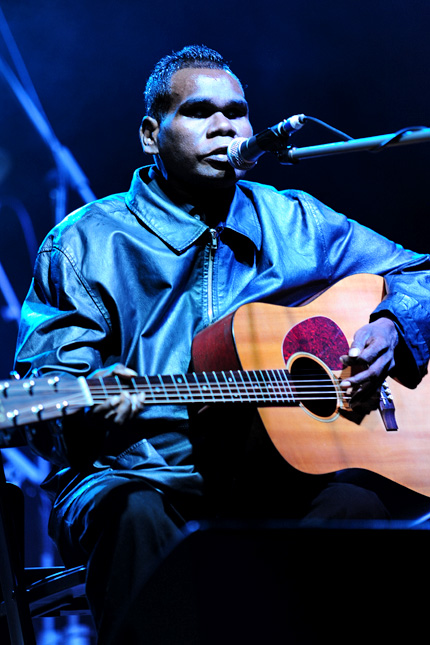
Gurrumul playing at the West Coast Blues & Roots Festival (2011)

In 1989, at the age of 18, Yunupingu joined Yothu Yindi as a multi-instrumentalist and backing vocalist, notably contributing to their 1991 album, Tribal Voice. He left the group in 1995 to live full-time on Elcho Island and later co-founded and co-led the Saltwater Band, which was active from 1999 to 2009. His first solo album, Gurrumul, was released in 2008, debuting at No. 69 on the ARIA Charts and No. 1 on the independent chart. Gurrumul peaked at No. 3 on the ARIA Charts. The album was certified triple platinum. Yunupingu's friend Michael Hohnen produced the album and was his translator, collaborator and confidant. Critics heaped praise on the singer, describing his voice as having "transcendental beauty". Elton John, Sting and Björk were among his fans. The money he made was largely shared with his family, following the Aboriginal tradition of sharing wealth. He did not generally give interviews, instead relying on Hohnen to speak for him, following a Yolŋu custom that dictated that Yunupingu's role was only to sing, while his elders spoke publicly. In a 2009 interview with him and Hohnen, Yunupingu said that he was generally shy but more comfortable playing music, and went on to say: "I don't have much to say to people when I talk. That is for other Yolŋu. But I can play and sing and tell people things through my songs. We have an encyclopedia of stories ready to tell people, if they want to listen."

In 2008 Yunupingu was nominated for four ARIA Awards, winning the awards for Best World Music Album and Best Independent Release. He also won three Deadlys, winning for Artist of the Year, Album of the Year for Gurrumul and Single of the Year for "Gurrumul History (I Was Born Blind)".

In November 2009, Yunupingu was named Best New Independent Artist and his album, Gurrumul, Best Independent Release and Best Independent Blues/Roots Release at the Australian Independent Record (AIR) Awards held at Melbourne's Corner Hotel. In 2009 a portrait of Yunupingu by Guy Maestri won Australia's major art prize, the Archibald Prize.

He was again awarded the Australian Independent Record (AIR) Award for Best Independent Blues and Roots Album in 2011 for his album Rrakala. At the ARIA Music Awards of 2011, he won Best World Music Album and performed "Warwu" featuring Missy Higgins on piano. In 2019, Double J's Dan Condon described it as one of "7 great performances from the history of the ARIA Awards."

In 2012, Yunupingu was one of the contributing vocalists on Gary Barlow's commemorative single "Sing" for Queen Elizabeth II's diamond jubilee celebrations, which features artists from across the Commonwealth. He performed "Sing" live at the Diamond Jubilee Concert on 4 June 2012 together with many of the song's contributing artists. In 2012, Yunupingu was conferred with an Honorary Doctorate of Music by the University of Sydney.

In 2013, Yunupingu joined Delta Goodrem for a special performance of "Bayini" on The Voice Australia. In December 2013, Yunupingu released a live album, titled His Life and Music, which was recorded in the Sydney Opera House and released through ABC Music. It was nominated for Australian Independent Record Labels Association and ARIA awards. "Bayini" became the first track by an indigenous musician to reach the top five of the Australian charts.

In 2015, Yunupingu toured the US. He released his third studio album, The Gospel Album, on 31 July 2015. It debuted at number 3 on the ARIA Charts. In October 2015, the album won Gurrumul's third ARIA Award for Best World Music Album.

In July 2016, Yunupingu featured on the A.B. Original track "Take Me Home".

=== 2017–present: Death and posthumous releases and recognition ===
Yunupingu died at the Royal Darwin Hospital, Northern Territory, at about 5:00 pm on 25 July 2017, aged 46. He had lived with liver and kidney damage for many years due to hepatitis B which he had contracted in childhood. On his death he was described as an important figure in fostering racial harmony and as a voice of Indigenous Australians. He received tributes from the Australian prime minister, Malcolm Turnbull, fellow musician Peter Garrett, and Anna Reid, the dean of the Sydney Conservatorium of Music.

In April 2018, Yunupingu's fourth studio album, Djarimirri (Child of the Rainbow), was released. It was an album four years in the making and was completed by producer and arranger Michael Hohnen. A documentary film titled Gurrumul was also released, which Luke Buckmaster reviewed, stating that "For Gurrumul fans, the film is obviously a must-see. For those unfamiliar, or vaguely familiar with his work, it's an even greater treat: they will be entertained, enthralled, perhaps in some small way changed." The album won four ARIA Music Awards at the 2018 ceremony; his daughter Jasmin accepted the award for Best Male Artist on his behalf.

In November 2020, Decca Records announced they had signed to the rights to Yunupingu's catalogue and future recordings, announcing forthcoming releases, including limited-edition vinyls, a box set and collaborations among a slate of projects. In December 2020, Yunupingu was listed at number 33 in Rolling Stone Australia's "50 Greatest Australian Artists of All Time" issue.

In September 2021, Yunupingu's first anthology was released, entitled The Gurrumul Story. In the same year, a species of frog from the Wessel Islands, Northern Territory, was named Uperoleia gurrumuli (Gurrumul's toadlet) in honour of Yunupingu.

On 8 November 2024, an album with the Prague Metropolitan Orchestra, conducted by Jan Chalupecky, titled Banbirrngu - The Orchestral Sessions was released. It features reworkings of some of his songs and features new arrangements by Australian composer Errkki Veltheim.

Gurrumul is set to be inducted into the ARIA Hall of Fame in a separate ceremony on 11 June 2026, as part of the 40th anniversary of the ARIA Awards.

== Discography ==
=== Studio albums ===
Title	Details	Peak chart positions						Certifications
Title	Details	AUS	BEL (FL)	FRA	GER	NL	SWI	Certifications
Gurrumul	Released: February 2008; Label: Skinnyfish Music (SFGU080201); Formats: CD, digital download	3	13	60	9	54	10	ARIA: 3× Platinum; BPI: Silver
Rrakala	Released: 15 April 2011; Label: Skinnyfish Music (SFGU110402); Formats: CD, digital download	3	85	—	—	—	34	ARIA: Platinum
The Gospel Album	Released: 31 July 2015; Label: Skinnyfish Music (SFGU150803); Formats: CD, digital download	3	—	—	—	—	—	
Djarimirri (Child of the Rainbow)	Released: 13 April 2018; Label: Skinnyfish Music (SFGU180413); Formats: CD, digital download	1	—	—	—	—	—	
"—" denotes releases that did not chart or were not released in that territory.

=== Live albums ===
Title	Details	Peak chart positions
Title	Details	AUS
Live in Darwin, Australia	Released: 16 July 2010; Label: Dramatico / Skinnyfish Music (0063); Formats: CD, digital download	—
His Life and Music (with the Sydney Symphony Orchestra)	Released: 6 December 2013; Label: Universal / Skinnyfish Music (3764720); Formats: CD, digital download	48
Banbirrngu - The Orchestral Sessions	Released: 8 November 2024; Label: Decca (6801695); Formats: CD, LP, streaming, digital download	— (Note: Banbirrngu - The Orchestral Sessions did not enter the ARIA top 100, but peaked at number 2 on the ARIA Classical Crossover chart.)
"—" denotes releases that did not chart or were not released in that territory.

=== Compilation albums ===
Title	Details	Peak chart positions
Title	Details	AUS
The Gurrumul Story	Released: 10 September 2021; Label: Decca (3586209); Formats: CD, LP, CD + DVD, streaming, digital download	34

== Awards and nominations ==
=== AIR Awards ===
The Australian Independent Record Awards (commonly known informally as AIR Awards) is an annual awards night to recognise, promote and celebrate the success of Australia's Independent Music sector.

Year	Nominee / work	Award	Result
2008	himself	Best New Independent Album	Won
2008	Gurrumul	Best Independent Album	Won
2008	Gurrumul	Best Independent Blues and Roots Album	Won
2011	Rrakala	Best Independent Blues and Roots Album	Won
2014	His Life and Music	Best Independent Classical Album	Won
2015	The Gospel Album	Best Independent Blues and Roots Album	Nominated
2019	Djarimirri	Best Independent Album/EP	Won
2019	Djarimirri	Best Independent Classical Album	Nominated
2019	himself	Best Independent Artist	Nominated

=== APRA Awards ===
The APRA Awards are presented annually from 1982 by the Australasian Performing Right Association (APRA), "honouring composers and songwriters".

Year	Nominee / work	Award	Result
1991	"Treaty" by Yothu Yindi (co-written by Geoffrey Gurrumul Yunupingu)	Song of the Year	Won
2009	Geoffrey Gurrumul Yunupingu	Breakthrough Song Writer	Won
2014	"Bayini" by Geoffrey Gurrumul Yunupingu (Rrawun D Maymuru)	Song of the Year	Shortlisted

=== ARIA Music Awards ===
The ARIA Music Awards is an annual awards ceremony that recognises excellence, innovation, and achievement across all genres of Australian music. Gurrumul has won 9 awards from 21 nominations.

Year	Nominee / work	Award	Result
2008	Gurrumul	Best Independent Release	Won
2008	Gurrumul	Best World Music Album	Won
2008	Gurrumul	Best Male Artist	Nominated
2008	Gurrumul	Album of the Year	Nominated
2008	Michael Hohnen and Geoffrey Gurrumul Yunupingu for Gurrumul	Producer of the Year	Nominated
2011	Rrakala	Best Independent Release	Nominated
2011	Rrakala	Best World Music Album	Won
2011	Rrakala	Best Male Artist	Nominated
2011	Rrakala	Album of the Year	Nominated
2011	Rrakala	Best Cover Art	Nominated
2011	"Gopuru" (directed by Carlo Santone)	Best Video	Nominated
2014	His Life and Music (with Sydney Symphony Orchestra)	Best Male Artist	Nominated
2014	His Life and Music (with Sydney Symphony Orchestra)	Best Original Soundtrack/Cast/Show Album	Won
2015	The Gospel Album	Best World Music Album	Won
2018	Djarimirri (Child of the Rainbow)	Album of the Year	Nominated
2018	Djarimirri (Child of the Rainbow)	Best Male Artist	Won
2018	Djarimirri (Child of the Rainbow)	Best Independent Release	Won
2018	Djarimirri (Child of the Rainbow)	Best World Music Album	Won
2018	Djarimirri (Child of the Rainbow)	Best Cover Art	Won
2018	Michael Hohnen for Djarimirri (Child of the Rainbow)	Producer of the Year	Nominated
2018	Ted Howard, Robin Mai & Matthew Cunliffe for Djarimirri (Child of the Rainbow)	Engineer of the Year	Nominated
2025	Banbirrngu - The Orchestral Sessions	Best World Music Album	Won
2026	Geoffrey Gurrumul Yunupingu	ARIA Hall of Fame	Inducted

=== Australian Music Prize ===
The Australian Music Prize (AMP) is an annual award of $30,000 given to an Australian band or solo artist in recognition of the merit of an album released during the year of award. The award commenced in 2005.

Year	Nominee / work	Award	Result
2011	Rrakala	Australian Music Prize	Nominated
2018	Djarimirri	Australian Music Prize	Won

=== J Award ===
The J Awards are an annual series of Australian music awards that were established by the Australian Broadcasting Corporation's youth-focused radio station Triple J. They commenced in 2005.

Year	Nominee / work	Award	Result
2018	himself	Double J Artist of the Year	Won

=== Helpmann Awards ===
The Helpmann Awards is an awards show, celebrating live entertainment and performing arts in Australia, presented by industry group Live Performance Australia since 2001. Note: 2020 and 2021 were cancelled due to the COVID-19 pandemic.

Year	Nominee / work	Award	Result	Ref.
2009	Geoffrey Gurrumul Yunupingu	Helpmann Award for Best Australian Contemporary Concert	Won	

=== National Indigenous Music Awards ===
The National Indigenous Music Awards recognise excellence, innovation and leadership among Aboriginal and Torres Strait Islander musicians from throughout Australia. It commenced in 2004.

Year	Nominee / work	Award	Result
2005	himself	Male Artist of the Year	Won
2008	Gurrumul	Album of the Year	Won
2008	Gurrumul	Cover Art of the Year	Won
2008	"Wiyathul"	Song of the Year	Won
2008	himself	Artist of the Year	Won
2009	Gurrumul	Cover Art of the Year	Won
2009	Gurrumul Geoffrey Yunupingu – "Bapa"	DVD/ Film Clip of the Year	Nominated
2009	himself	Artist of the Year	Won
2010	"History"	Film Clip of the Year	Won
2010	himself	Artist of the Year	Won
2011	Rrakala	Album of the Year	Won
2011	Rrakala	Cover Art of the Year	Won
2011	"Mala Rrakala"	Song of the year	Nominated
2011	"Gathu Mawula" (featuring Blue King Brown)	Song of the year	Won
2011	"Gathu Mawula" (featuring Blue King Brown)	Film Clip of the year	Won
2011	himself	Artist of the year	Won
2012	"Bayini" (featuring Sarah Blasko)	Cover Art of the Year	Won
2012	"Bayini" (featuring Sarah Blasko)	Song of the Year	Nominated
2012	himself	Artist of the year	Won
2013	himself	Special Recognition Award	Won
2013	himself	Artist of the Year	Nominated
2013	"Bayini" (live) - with Delta Goodrem	Song of the Year	Nominated
2013	"A Baru in New York" - with Yolanda Be Cool	Song of the Year	Nominated
2014	himself	Artist of the Year	Nominated
2014	Album of the Year	His Life and Music (with Sydney Symphony Orchestra)	Nominated
2014	Song of the Year	"Marilitja"	Nominated
2016	"The Children Came Back" Briggs and Dewayne Everettsmith (featuring Gurrumul)	Song of the Year	Won
2016	"The Children Came Back" Briggs and Dewayne Everettsmith (featuring Gurrumul)	Film Clip of the Year	Nominated
2016	himself	Artist of the year	Won
2016	The Gospel Album	Album of the Year	Nominated
2016	The Gospel Album	Best Cover Art of the Year	Nominated
2018	Djarimirri (Child of the Rainbow)	Album of the Year	Won
2018	"Djarimirri (Child of the Rainbow)"	Song of the Year	Won
2018	himself	Artist of the year	Won
2022	Gurrumul	Hall of Fame	inductee
