= The Gospel Album =

Studio album by Geoffrey Gurrumul Yunupingu
- Released: 31 July 2015
- Genres: Folk; world; Aboriginal; inspirational
- Length: 53:15
- Label: Skinnyfish Music
- Producer: Michael Hohnen

Geoffrey Gurrumul Yunupingu chronology
His Life and Music (2013)	The Gospel Album (2015)	Djarimirri (Child of the Rainbow) (2018)

The Gospel Album is the third studio album from Geoffrey Gurrumul Yunupingu. It is performed in a mixture of both Yolngu and English. The album was announced in May and is described as "a uniquely Indigenous approach to gospel songs with an expanded sound that combines new hymns, and reimagined gospel songs". The album was released on 31 July 2015 and reached number three on the ARIA charts in August 2015.

The album is a dedication to Gurrumul's mother and aunts, who brought him up with songs and lullabies from the church at Elcho Island. As a small boy Gurrumul was not only influenced by the traditional music of his clan but by the gospel music he heard at the local Methodist church. It is a re-imagining of the spiritual songs that came to north-east Arnhem Land via Christian missionaries.

The album cover who captured by Sydney photographer Nic Walker. A music video for "Jesu" was released on 3 July 2015. A music video for "Amazing Grace" (featuring Paul Kelly) was released on 8 September 2015.

The Gospel Album was the last album Gurrumul released before he died on 25 July 2017, with Djarimirri being posthumously distributed.

== Critical reception ==
Michael Dwyer from Rolling Stone gave the album 3 out of 5, describing the album as a "slow, gentle, atmospheric hymnbook". He added "there are some subtle sonic developments whispering beneath the singer's trademark hypnotic lull.. but overall, the key word is familiar."

Daniel Prior from The Brag gave the album 4 out of 5, saying; "Music has the power to transcend all physical, emotional and spiritual boundaries, and The Gospel Album preaches this on every song."

Mikey Cahill from news.com.au gave the album 3.5 out of 5 saying the album is 'soothing'. He complemented the tracks 'Jesu', 'Garray Jesu' and 'Hallelujah'.

Paul Barr from Readings gave the album a positive review, saying; "This music radiates peace and calm, and Gurrumul’s native Yolngu language allows the full emotion to come through." He praised tracks 'Jesu', 'Baptism' and "the beautiful version" of 'Amazing Grace'.

Darren Hassan from Glam Adelaide said the album looks set to be a hit with "a mixture of recognisable church songs mostly sung in the Yolngu language."

== Track listing ==
1. "Jesu" – 4:22
2. "Trinity" – 4:31
3. "Nhaku Limurr" – 4:31
4. "The Sweetest Name" – 3:51
5. "All God's Children (Yo Djamarrkuli)" – 4:24
6. "Baptism" – 4:36
7. "Garray Jesu (My Lord)" – 4:26
8. "Hallelujah" – 4:22
9. "Walu (Time)" – 3:58
10. "Saviour" – 2:27
11. "Amazing Grace" – 3:16
12. "Riyala (There Is a River)" – 4:24
13. "Amazing Grace" (featuring Paul Kelly) – 4:07

== Chart performance ==
The Gospel Album debuted at number 3 in Australia. This is his third studio album and third to peak at number 3.

=== Weekly charts ===
Chart (2015)	Peak position
Australian Albums Chart	3

== Awards ==
"The Gospel Album" won the ARIA Award for Best World Music Album at the ARIA Music Awards of 2015. This is the third time Gurrumul has won this award.

== Tour ==
The Gospel Songs Australia Tour 2015.

Date	Location	Venue
29 July 2015	Sydney	Enmore Theatre
2 August 2015	Brisbane	QPAC Concert Hall
5 August 2015	Adelaide	Adelaide Festival Centre
8 August 2015	Melbourne	Supersense Festival
10 August 2015	Canberra	Canberra Theatre
2 August 2015	Perth	Perth Concert Hall
