= Gurrumul (album) =

Studio album by Geoffrey Gurrumul Yunupingu
- Released: April 2008
- Genres: Folk; world
- Length: 61:18
- Languages: Galpu; Gumatj; Djambarrpuyngu; English
- Label: Skinnyfish Music

Geoffrey Gurrumul Yunupingu chronology
Gurrumul (2008)	Live in Darwin, Australia (2010)

Professional ratings
Review scores
Source	Rating
AllMusic	4/5 stars
The Sydney Morning Herald	favourable

Gurrumul is the debut solo album for Geoffrey Gurrumul Yunupingu. It is performed in a mixture of both Yolngu and English. The album has received praise for connecting on a deeply emotional level, as it tells the story of a persecuted people group (aboriginal Australians) as well as the singer's own suffering with both racial persecution and his visual impairment.

It reached number three on the ARIA charts, won ARIA awards for Best World Music Album and Best Independent Release and won a Deadly for Album of the Year. The track "Gurrumul History (I Was Born Blind)" also won a Deadly for Single of the Year.

The album reached 3× Platinum sales in excess of 210,000. In October 2010, it was listed in the top 30 in the book, 100 Best Australian Albums. On November 23, 2012, the album was certified Silver in the United Kingdom for sales of 60,000 copies. It is the best-selling Aboriginal and Torres Strait Islander music album in Australian history, launching Yunupingu's international solo career and establishing him as one of Australia's most significant musical artists.

In 2018, the album was inducted into the National Film and Sound Archive's Sounds of Australia collection of historic recordings, the first recording selected in its first year of eligibility. In December 2021, the album was listed at no. 20 in Rolling Stone Australia’s ‘200 Greatest Albums of All Time’ countdown.

== Track listing ==
All tracks written by Geoffrey Gurrumul Yunupingu.

No.	Title	Length
1.	"Wiyathul"	5:53
2.	"Djȁrimirri"	3:55
3.	"Bȁpa"	2:35
4.	"Gurrumul History (I Was Born Blind)"	5:52
5.	"Marrandil"	6:26
6.	"Marwurrumburr"	3:15
7.	"Galiku"	8:21
8.	"Baywara"	6:23
9.	"Gȁthu Mȁwula"	4:28
10.	"Galupa"	5:00
11.	"Wirrpangu"	4:56
12.	"Wukun"	4:14
Total length:		61:18

== Charts ==
=== Weekly charts ===
Chart (2008–09)	Peak position
Australian Albums (ARIA)	3
Belgian Albums (Ultratop Flanders)	13
Belgian Albums (Ultratop Wallonia)	90
Dutch Albums (Album Top 100)	54
French Albums (SNEP)	60
German Albums (Offizielle Top 100)	9
Scottish Albums (Official Charts)	54
Swiss Albums (Schweizer Hitparade)	10
UK Albums (Official Charts)	48
UK Independent Albums (Official Charts)	4

=== Year-end charts ===
Chart (2008)	Position
Australian Albums (ARIA)	21
Australian Artist Albums (ARIA)	5

Chart (2009)	Position
Australian Albums (ARIA)	53
Swiss Albums (Schweizer Hitparade)	92

== Certifications ==
Region	Certification	Certified units/sales
Australia (ARIA)	3× Platinum	210,000^{^}
United Kingdom (BPI)	Silver	60,000^{^}
^{^} Shipments figures based on certification alone.
