= Skinnyfish Music =

Australian independent record label

- Founded: 1999; 26 years ago
- Genre: Indigenous Roots
- Country of origin: Australia
- Location: Darwin
- Official website: www.skinnyfishmusic.com.au

Skinnyfish Music is a Darwin, Australia based independent record label. The label blends traditional Australian First Nations sounds, language, and instrumentation with modern western music genres.

== History ==
Skinnyfish Music was co-founded in 1999 by Mark Grose and Michael Hohnen. The label connects remote Indigenous communities to mainstream global music markets through business development mentoring, education and promotion.

Skinnyfish undertake extensive community engagement around the production and cultural preservation of First Nations music, through consultation with the musicians, family members and community elders. They also support a model of fostering economic independence in their artists and encourage local music at community events.

In 2009 they struck a deal with Dramatico Entertainment for the Pan-European release of all the label's albums, after the success of "Gurrumul" across Europe

In 2023 in an international, cross-cultural effort with Dr. Lily Yulianti Farid, Skinny Fish Music helped to facilitate the recording of a Yolngu-Macassan version "Bayini", a significant story for Yolngu peoples.

== Notable artists associated with Skinnyfish Music ==
- Geoffrey Gurrumul Yunupingu
- Lonely Boys
- B2M (Bathurst to Melville)
- Saltwater Band
- Mark A Hunter, Songs from the Buffalo Country (2008)
- Nabarlek Band
- Ego Lemos, O Hele Le (2009)
- Wildflower Band
- Manuel Dhurrkay
- June Mills, I'll be the One (2005)
- Shellie Morris
- Mambali Band
- Tom E Lewis
- Dewayne Everettsmith

== Community engagement ==
The label engages with Indigenous communities through touring music groups and artists to festivals, where the main message is of cultural pride, healthy lifestyle education and social change promotion.

The label has also been notable for its championing of fair compensation for artists.

Skinnyfish Music has played a significant role in addressing pressing social issues within remote Indigenous communities.

== Projects and festivals ==
- Galiwin'ku Festival - Healthy Lifestyle Festival started in 1998 and was managed by the Ngalkanbuy Health Clinic.
- Barunga Festival - A celebration of remote Indigenous community life, held annually on the Queen's birthday long weekend June in the small community of Barunga.
- Darwin International Jazz & Arts Festival - held on one night in July (the Dinidjanggama heavy dew season) of Garramilla, Gulumoerrgin, Larrakia country Initiatied by Skinnyfish Music in 2023.
- Skinnyfish Sound System - Modern Tribal Late Night Dance Party bringing indigenous musicians from remote Australia to remix their traditional songs to popular beats

== Awards and recognition ==
- 2013 - Grose and Hohnen awarded Australian of the Year for the Northern Territory.
- 2018 - Outstanding Achievement Award, Australian Independent Record Awards.
