= National Indigenous Music Awards 2013 =

Annual Australian music awards ceremony

- Date: 10 August 2013
- Venue: The Amphitheatre Botanical Gardens, Northern Territory, Australia
- Hosted by: Peter Garrett

Highlights
- Most wins: Archie Roach (3)
- Website: nima.musicnt.com.au

Television/radio coverage
- Network: National Indigenous Television

The National Indigenous Music Awards 2013 were the tenth annual National Indigenous Music Awards.

The nominations were announced on 7 July 2013 and the awards ceremony was held on 10 August 2013.

Michael Chugg from Chugg Entertainment said "NIMA has come a long way in a short time and is exceptional fertile ground for finding and breaking new indigenous artists. NIMA is gathering much respect both nationally and overseas for the professionalism it is bringing to the indigenous music scene." Shellie Morris, the best female musicians for 2004 and 2005 NT Music Awards, said "These awards are becoming more significant every year, it's a great time for Indigenous talent to gain recognition for their efforts. Artists and their management should use this as an opportunity that is knocking on their door right now."

In recognition of the 2013 passing of Dr Yunupingu, the evening concluded with a very special tribute to Yothu Yindi.

== Performers ==
- Gurrumul Yunupingu - "Maralitja"
- Kahl Wallace & Jindhu Lawrie with special guest Bunna Lawrie (Coloured Stone)
- Shellie Morris - "Dots on the Shells"
- Kutcha Edwards & Dewayne Everettsmith - "Djäpana"
- Rrawun Maymuru from East Journey
- Grant Nundhirribala
- Djopla McKenzie
- Jimblah - "Fire"
- Rolku Band (Milingimbi) and the original members of Yothu Yindi & special guest David Gulpilil

== Hall of Fame Inductee ==
- Henry "Seaman" Dan, Wirrinyga Band, Archie Roach

== Special Recognition Award ==
- Gurrumul Yunupingu

== Triple J Unearthed National Indigenous Winner ==
- Robbie Miller

Robbie Miller is a young Brisbane artist brought up to the sounds of Cat Stevens, Van Morrison and Neil Young and first picked up a guitar in 2002. His passion saw him graduate music from Queensland University of Technology in 2010 and has since developed his unique, solo sound. In 2013, he released the singles "Don't Go Walking Away" and "Oh Lord".

== Awards ==
Artist of the Year

Artist	Result
Gurrumul Yunupingu	Nominated
Jessica Mauboy	Won
Yothu Yindi	Nominated

Best New Talent of the Year

Artist	Result
Benny Walker	Nominated
Bryte	Nominated
DT3	Nominated
Dubmarine	Nominated
Thelma Plum	Won

Album of the Year

Artist and album	Result
Archie Roach - Into the Bloodstream	Won
Benny Walker - Saints and Sinners	Nominated
Kutcha Edwards - Blak & Blu	Nominated
Shellie Morris & The Borroloola Songwomen's Ngambala Wiji Li-Wunungu – Together We Are Strong	Nominated

Film Clip of the Year

Artist and song	Result
Archie Roach – "Song to Sing"	Won
Dubmarine – "Beat in Control"	Nominated
Gowrie Boys -	Nominated

Song of the Year

Artist and song	Result
Archie Roach -	Nominated
Bennie Walker -	Nominated
Gurrumul Yunupingu with Delta Goodrem - "Bayini" (live)	Nominated
Gurrumul Yunupingu with Yolanda Be Cool - "A Baru in New York"	Nominated
Shellie Morris and The Borroloola Songwomen – "Waliwaliyangu li-Anthawirriyarra a-Kurija (Saltwater People Song)"	Won
Thelma Plum - "Around Here"	Nominated

Cover Art of the Year

Artist and album	Result
Archie Roach – Into the Bloodstream	Won

Traditional Song of the Year

Artist and song	Result
The Mulka Manikay Archives - "Wandawuy"	Won

Community Clip of the Year

Artist and song	Result
Rockhole - "Wurli"	Won

NT School Band of the Year

Artist and song	Result
Rulku	Won
