= Munkimuk =

Australian musician

Mark Ross, known as Munk or Munkimuk is a Sydney-based hip hop performer and music producer. He is known as The Grandfather of Indigenous Hip Hop and has been performing since 1983 as a breakdancer and rapping professionally since 1987. He is mostly known for his music production, as well as MCíng, breakdancing, event hosting and radio broadcasting. He has also been quoted as an influence on quite a few Australian hip hop artists. He has been working in the music industry for 40 years and has mentored and produced countless artists and acts both in Australia and Asia.

In 2014 Mark Munk Ross was inducted into the National Indigenous Music Awards Hall Of Fame.

Mark began his music career in Sydney in the mid-late 1980s, he was already breakdancing and was inspired by artists that he met at festivals. He decided to teach himself music production and took to it fast, learning bass, keyboards, drums - and how to manipulate a sampler with a scratch pad.. From 1987 till 1990, he worked at Festival Records as part of the production team working on many recordings including Warumpi Band's Go Bush album.

Munkimuk was the founding member of Deadly Award-winning group South West Syndicate. He released a demo album of songs in 2005. He began rapping in his language group Jardwadjali (from the Grampians in Victoria) in 1999. The majority of his raps are in English. He is also an accomplished freestyle MC and has toured internationally playing shows in Asia, Europe, Canada and USA. He has played hundreds of shows since 1989 including Big Day Out, Mumbai Festival, Yabun, The Deadlys, Corroboree 2000, Barunga Festival, AFL, NRL, Arafura Games, Sydney Writers Festival, NT Writers Festival, Carnivale, Stylin Up, Klub Koori and Vibe 3 on 3 Basketball and Hip Hop Events.

In 2006 Munkimuk was nominated for a Deadly in the category of Single Release of the Year for his song Dreamtime. Another mix of the track Dreamtime features on 2009 compilation CD "Making Waves - Indigenous Hip Hop" released through Gadigal Music and ABC. Munk in late 2012 began a new project named "Renegades Of Munk" and in 2014 released the debut self-titled album, featuring an array of guests including Midnight Oil's Rob Hirst, Anne Kirkpatrick, Eric Grothe Jnr, Wilma Reading, Warren H. Williams, Kutcha Edwards, Stiff Gins and a host of others. In 2018 Munk became part of the reformed, new incarnation of South West Syndicate, after a 14 year hiatus. This led to the release of the 2019 single "Back Like A Boomerang", as well as the 2024 South West Syndicate album "Promised Land".

Munk has a production house known as Munk Funk Productions, as he is well known for his songwriting, production, recording, mixing & mastering. He has worked with various artists over the last 40 years including Blackpink, Beyonce, Madonna, Kylie Minogue, Vitamin A, Toni Janke, Canisha, Rob Hirst, Fred Leone, Jimblah, L-FRESH the Lion, Yothu Yindi, Nabarlek (band), Thirsty Merc, Grinspoon, Hard-Ons, Microwave Jenny, Pat Powell, Shellie Morris, Ebony Williams, Stiff Gins, Poppy Kelly, Gii Music, Daniel Johns and many other groups and artists. He also plays bass, rhythm and lead guitar, keyboards and drums. He was previously a producer/engineer at Kameygal Studios for many years. Since 2013, Mark has been producing and co-writing songs including multiple hit singles. Mark has his own mixing & mastering studio.

in 2021/22 Mark Munk Ross was selected as a composer in the Ngarra-Burria First People's composer's initiative, an initiative intended for First Peoples skills development and industry connections in the new music/classical composition arena. The program was developed by Aboriginal composer Dr Christopher Sainsbury, and started in 2016 with partners including the School of Music at the Australian National University, Ensemble Offspring, the ABC and the Australian Music Centre. Munk composed several works during his time in the program, including "Streets of Sydney", which was included in the Ngarra-Burria CD performed by Ensemble Offspring and released through ABC Classics.

He has previously been a radio presenter on 93.7FM Koori Radio hosting Making Tracks, The Brekky Show, Funky Lunch and the Indij Hip Hop Show. Also, he has been a presenter on ABC Radio and Channel V, on TV. He won a CBAA Award in 2008 for Contribution to Local Music. Munk also had a segment on the Deadly Sounds program called Hip Hop Drop. In 2011, Munkimuk was nominated for a Deadly Award for Community Broadcaster of the Year.

Munkimuk Arts is his visual arts moniker and he has been a feature artist on the Google search engine celebrating Lionel Rose as well as providing the artwork for YouTube's NAIDOC 2023.

Mark has worked around Australia on community educational music & hip-hop projects and has for many years including creating and working on events with Moogahlin Performing Arts, Gadigal Information Service/Koori Radio, Vibe Australia, Triple J, Jimmy Little Foundation, Australia Council, APRA, Bankstown Youth Development Service, Blacktown Arts Centre and other organizations mentoring emerging artists.

As a B-Boy, Munk has been breakdancing since 1982/3 and still is active.

== Discography ==
- Ten Years Too Late (2005 Demo)
- "Renegades Of Munk" (2014) through Impossible Odds Records an MGM Distribution
- Streets of Sydney (2022)
- Promised Land - South West Syndicate (2024)
