= NT Indigenous Music Awards 2006 =

Indigenous Music awards in Northern Territory, Australia

- Date: 25 August 2006
- Venue: Darwin, Northern Territory, Australia

Highlights
- Most wins: Warren H. Williams (2)
- Website: nima.musicnt.com.au

The NT Indigenous Music Awards 2006 was the third annual National Indigenous Music Awards, established by MusicNT.

The awards ceremony was held on 25 August 2006. More than 2,000 people filed into Darwin's Amphitheatre to witness the event.

== Hall of Fame Inductee ==
- Warumpi Band and Soft Sands

== Outstanding Contribution to Music Awards ==
- Sammy Butcher and Keith Lapalung

== Awards ==
Act of the Year

Artist	Result
Yilila	Won

Best Male Musician

Artist	Result
Grant Nundhirribala	Won

Best Female Musician

Artist	Result
June Mills	Won

Best Emerging Artist of the Year

Artist	Result
Task (from North Coast Clique)	Won

Best Music Release

Artist & album	Result
Tom E. Lewis – "Sunshine After Rain"	Won

Song of the Year Award

Artist and Song	Result
Warren H. Williams - ""Learn My Song""	Won

Best Cover Art

Artist & Album	Result
Warren H. Williams - Be Like Home	Won

Best DVD Release

Artist	Result
Nabarlek	Won

Traditional Music Award

Artist & Album	Result
White Cockatoo - "Maningrida"	Won
