= National Indigenous Music Awards 2009 =

Annual Australian music awards ceremony

- Date: 21 August 2009
- Venue: Northern Territory, Australia

Highlights
- Most wins: Geoffrey Gurrumul Yunupingu & Jessica Mauboy (2)
- Website: nima.musicnt.com.au

The National Indigenous Music Awards 2009 were the sixth annual National Indigenous Music Awards, first under its new name after being previously called NT Indigenous Music Awards.

The awards ceremony was held on 21 August 2009.

== Hall of Fame Inductees ==
- Sammy Butcher, Tableland Drifters and David Asera

Sammy Butcher was born at Papunya, Northern Territory in Central Australia. He formed the Warumpi Band with George Burarrwanga, Neil Murray and Gordon Butcher in the late 1970s.

Tableland Drifters was formed in 1985 and perform country rock music across the Northern Territory.

David Asera, a mentor, musician and helped with Road Safety All Stars and Keep Australia Beautiful.

== Awards ==
Act of the Year

Artist	Result
Jessica Mauboy	Nominated
Geoffrey Gurrumul Yunupingu	Won

Emerging Act of the Year

Artist	Result
Wildflower	Nominated
Tjupi Band	Nominated
Garrangali Band	Nominated
Pott Street	Won

The winner won a $10,000 cash prize.

Album of the Year

Artist and album	Result
Robyn Green - I Will Arise	Nominated
Jessica Mauboy - Been Waiting	Won
Tjupi Band - Kutju Ngarala	Nominated
Mark A. Hunter - Songs of the Buffalo Country	Nominated

DVD/Film Clip of the Year

Artist and song	Result
Gurrumul Geoffrey Yunupingu – "Bapa"	Nominated
MC Hora - "The Turn Around"	Nominated
Radical Son - "Human Behaviour"	Nominated
Dunganda Street Sounds - "Senor"	Won
Muyngarnbi, Songs from Walking with Spirit - "Millay Millay 1"	Nominated

Song of the Year

Artist and song	Result
Sandridge Band – "Warlajbarkigi"	Nominated
Milyakburra Ban - "Lena Bulunga"	Nominated
Lonely Boys - "Trouble Maker"	Nominated
Mark A. Hunter - "Barramundi"	Nominated
Wildflower - "Galiwin'ku"	Nominated
MC Hora – "The Turn Around"	Nominated
Rhubee Neale - "Crystal Velvet Night"	Nominated
Dunganda Street Sounds - "Senor"	Nominated
Robyn Green - "I Will Arise"	Nominated
Jessica Mauboy- "Running Back"	Won

Artwork of the Year

Artist and album	Result
Geoffrey Gurrumul Yunupingu - Gurrumul	Won
Milyakburra Band - Ena Bulanga	Nominated
Lonely Boys - Lonely Child	Nominated
Robyn Green - I Will Arise	Nominated

Traditional Music Award

Artist and song	Result
Ramingining Artists – Dunganda Street Sounds	Won

People's Choice - Song of the Year

Artist and song	Result
MC Hora - "The Turn Around"	Won
