= NT Indigenous Music Awards 2005 =

Indigenous Music awards in Northern Territory, Australia

- Date: 27 August 2005
- Venue: Marrara Oval, Northern Territory, Australia

Highlights
- Most wins: Jurtbirrk & Yilila Band (2)
- Website: nima.musicnt.com.au

The NT Indigenous Music Awards 2005 were the second annual National Indigenous Music Awards, established by MusicNT.

The awards ceremony was held on 27 August 2005.

== Performers ==
- The Mills Family
- George Rrurrambu
- Letterstick Band
- Shellie Morris
- Mandy Garling and Jessica Mauboy
- Geoffrey Gurrumul Yunupingu
- Herbie Laughton, Gus Williams and Auriel Andrews

== Hall of Fame Inductee ==
- The Mystics, David and Kathy Mills Herbie Laughton, Gus Williams, Auriel Andrew, Dick Mununggu, Mr. Yamma Snr

== Outstanding Contribution to Music Awards ==
- CAAMA Music and The Letterstick Band

== Awards ==
Male Artist of the Year

Artist	Result
Geoffrey Gurrumul Yunupingu	Won

Female Artist of the Year

Artist	Result
Shellie Morris	Won

Band of the Year

Artist	Result
Nabarlek	Won

Best Emerging Artist of the Year

Artist	Result
Mandy Garling	Won

Best Music Release

Artist & album	Result
Yilila Band - Manila, Manila	Won

Song of the Year

Artist & album	Result
Yilila Band - "Mijiyanga"	Won

Most Popular Song Award

Artist and Song	Result
Warren H. Williams - "Dreamtime Baby"	Won

People's Choice Award

Artist	Result
Saltwater Band	Won

Best Cover Art

Artist & Album	Result
Jurtbirrk - Love Songs from Western Arnhem Land	Won

Traditional Music Award

Artist & Album	Result
Jurtbirrk - Love Songs from Western Arnhem Land	Won
