= Soft Sands =

Soft Sands may refer to:

- Soft Sands (band), a country and gospel band from Arnhem Land, Australia, or their debut album
- Soft Sands (album), a 1957 album by Oscar Peterson
