= Deadly Awards 2001 =

The Deadlys Awards were an annual celebration of Australian Aboriginal and Torres Strait Islander achievement in music, sport, entertainment and community.

== Music ==
- Outstanding Contribution to Aboriginal Music: Gus Williams
- Outstanding Contribution to Aboriginal Music: Vic Simms
- Band of the Year: Letterstick Band
- Most Promising New Talent: J Boy
- Country Artist of the Year: Troy Cassar-Daley
- Male Artist of the Year: Kutcha Edwards
- Female Artist of the Year: Kerrianne Cox
- Album Release of the Year: Warren H Williams Where My Heart Is
- Single Release: Stiff Gins Morning Star
- Excellence in Film or Theatrical Score: Mark Ovenden & Yothu Yindi for Yolngu Boy

== Community ==
- Aboriginal Broadcaster of The Year: 2CUZ FM
