= National Indigenous Music Awards 2014 =

Annual Australian music awards ceremony

- Date: 10 August 2014
- Venue: The Amphitheatre Botanical Gardens, Northern Territory, Australia
- Hosted by: Aaron Pedersen

Highlights
- Most wins: Dan Sultan (3)
- Most nominations: Dan Sultan (5)
- Website: nima.musicnt.com.au

Television/radio coverage
- Network: National Indigenous Television

The National Indigenous Music Awards 2014 were the 11th annual National Indigenous Music Awards.

The nominations were announced on 24 July 2014 and the awards ceremony was held on 10 August 2014.

== Performers ==
- Dan Sultan
- Catherine Satour
- Tom E. Lewis
- The Tjintu Desert Band
- The Desert Divas,
- The Arnhem Land dancers Djuki Mala (Chooky Dancers).
- Hip hop showcase featuring - Briggs, Jimblah, The Last Kinection and Philly

== Hall of Fame Inductee ==
- Munkimuk

Mark Ross (aka Munkimuk) is a Sydney-based hip-hop performer and music producer. He is known as "The Grandfather of Indigenous Hip Hop" and has been performing since 1984.

== Triple J Unearthed National Indigenous Winner ==
- Philly

Philly was born in 1991. His traditional homeland is in Swan Hill, on banks of the Murray River. Philly said "I feel like I'm obligated to use my music to make change for the better and to use my craft to teach. Through music I have always wanted to voice my opinion; whether it be about Aboriginal issues or to bring positive messages for Aboriginal youth, I understand that I have been given an opportunity to inform." He released his debut single "We On" in 2014.

== Awards ==
Artist of the Year

Artist	Result
Jessica Mauboy	Won
Dan Sultan	Nominated
Gurrumul Yunupingu	Nominated
Shellie Morris	Nominated

Best New Talent of the Year

Artist	Result
East Journey	Nominated
Briggs	Won
Tjintu Desert Band	Nominated

Album of the Year

Artist and album	Result
Dan Sultan - Blackbird	Won
Gurrumul Yunupingu and the Sydney Symphony Orchestra - His Life and Music	Nominated
Busby Marou - Farewell Fitzroy	Nominated

Film Clip of the Year

Artist and song	Result
East Journey – "Bright Lights Big City"	Won
Jimblah - "Brotherman "	Nominated
Dan Sultan - "Under Your Skin"	Nominated

Song of the Year

Artist and song	Result
Busby Marou – "My Second Mistake"	Nominated
Busby Marou – "Get You Out Of Here"	Nominated
Gurrumul Yunupingu - "Marilitja"	Nominated
Dewayne Everettsmith March and Jimblah - "It's Like Love"	Nominated
Dan Sultan - "The Same Man"	Won

Cover Art of the Year

Artist and album	Result
Dan Sultan - Blackbird	Won
Tom E Lewis - Beneath the Sun	Nominated
Jimblah - Phoenix	Nominated

Traditional Song of the Year

Artist and song	Result
Jaydron Nundhirribala, Roland Nundhirribala and Grant Nundhirribala and Lindsay Gameraidj – "Nangale"	Won

Community Clip of the Year

Artist and song	Result
The Kids of Manmoyi and Nabarlek Band Members - "Bush Food is Really Really Good"	Nominated
Indigenous Hip Hop Projects - "KNX Respect"	Nominated
Desert Sevenz - "Fly Back Home"	Won
Desert Pea Media - "E Girlz"	Nominated
