= NT Indigenous Music Awards 2007 =

Indigenous Music awards in Northern Territory, Australia

- Date: August 2007
- Venue: Gardens Amphitheatre, Botanic Gardens, Darwin, Northern Territory, Australia

Highlights
- Most wins: Nabarlek (4)
- Website: nima.musicnt.com.au

The NT Indigenous Music Awards 2007 were the fourth annual National Indigenous Music Awards, established by MusicNT. The awards ceremony was held in August 2007.

== Performers ==
The evening featured a number of special guests including Jessica Mauboy, Mandawuy Yunupingu from Yothu Yindi, Gurrumul Yunupingu from Saltwater Band and the Kenbi Dancers, who opened the event with traditional dancing.

== Hall of Fame Inductee ==
- Betty Fisher and Barry Benning

== Outstanding Contribution to Music Awards ==
- Paul "Djolpa" McKenzie and Steven Tranter

== Awards ==
Act of the Year

Artist	Result
Jessica Mauboy	Won

Album of the Year

Artist & Album	Result
Nabarlek - Manmoyi Radio	Won

Song of the Year

Artist & song	Result
Little Journey to Manmoyi - "Terrah Guymala"	Won

People's Choice - "Song for Country"

Artist & song	Result
Nabarlek - "Bushfire"	Won

Best New Talent

Artist	Result
Leah Flanagan	Won

Artwork & Design of the Year

Artist & Album	Result
Nabarlek - Manmoyi Radio	Won

DVD/Film Clip of the Year

Artist	Result
Nabarlek - "Brown Bird"	Won

Traditional Music Award

Artist & Album	Result
Kenbi Dancers	Won
Kevin Djimarr - Wurrurrumi Kun-Borrk: Songs from Western Arnhem Land	Won

School Band of the Year

Artist & Album	Result
The Crazy Boyz	Won
