= Robbie Miller =

Australian singer

- Born: Australia
- Origin: Brisbane, Australia
- Occupation: singer
- Instrument: Vocals
- Years active: 2013–present
- Website: www.robbiemillermusic.com

Robbie Miller is an Australian singer. In 2013, Miller won Triple J Unearthed National Indigenous Winner at the National Indigenous Music Awards 2013 with his song "Don't Go Walking Away" and an APRA Award in 2017 for "The Pain". Miller released his debut studio album in February 2021.

== Career ==
=== 2002-2018: Early years and EPs ===
Miller first picked up a guitar in 2002 and soon after started writing and recording music. His passion saw him graduate music from Queensland University of Technology in 2010.

In 2013, he released the singles "Don't Go Walking Away" and "Oh Lord". At the National Indigenous Music Awards 2013, he was the Triple J Unearthed National Indigenous Winner and Miller earned a place on tour with The Paper Kites while "Don't Go Walking Away" gained national airplay.

Miller spent most of 2014 and 2015 working away on his debut EP The Faster The Blood Slows.

In October 2014, Miller released "Sunday", the lead single from the EP. The EP was released in October 2015 in conjunction with second single "The Pain".

In 2016, Miller released "Road" and "Fire" from his second EP Closer to Home.

At the APRA Music Awards of 2017, Miller won Blues & Roots Work of the Year for "The Pain".

=== 2019-present: Little Love ===
In 2019, Miller began releasing singles from his debut studio album with "The Come Down" and "Show Your Skin" with "Bitterness" released in April 2020.

In February 2021, Miller released his debut studio album Little Love. Miller worked with producer Alex Henriksson and sound engineer Matt Neighbour.

On making the album, Miller said "There is truth in every lyric, meaning behind every melody, feeling in every hum. Little Love is an album that wraps itself around my life for the last 3 years. There is an honesty in the album that I never truly sang or wrote about until this album. Giving myself up in a way that has always terrified me. There were truths I had to confront and lessons that needed to be learnt. I had to own who I was but most importantly own who I wasn't and truthfully, at times that hurt."

== Discography ==
=== Albums ===
Title	Details
Little Love	Released: 12 February 2021; Label: Robbie Miller; Format: digital download, streaming

=== Extended plays ===
Title	Details
The Faster the Blood Slows	Released: 2 October 2015; Label: Robbie Miller (RM001); Format: digital download, streaming, CD
Closer to Home	Released: 28 October 2016; Label: Robbie Miller (RM002); Format: digital download, streaming, CD

=== Singles ===
==== As lead artist ====
List of singles, with year released
Title	Year	Album
"Don't Go Walking Away"	2013	Non-album singles
"Oh Lord"	2013	Non-album singles
"Sunday"	2014	The Faster the Blood Slows
"The Pain"	2015	The Faster the Blood Slows
"Road"	2016	Closer to Home
"Fire"	2016	Closer to Home
"Baby"	2018	non album single
"Show Your Skin"	2019	Little Love
"The Come Down" (with Greta Stanley)	2019	Little Love
"Bitterness"	2020	Little Love
"On the Run"	2020	Little Love
"Two People"	2020	Little Love
"I Heard You Say"	2020	Little Love
"Charlie Orange"	2021	Little Love

==== As featured artist ====
Title	Year	Album
"When Did We Grow Up" (Saint Lane featuring Robbie Miller)	2020	Non-album single

== Awards and nominations ==
=== APRA Awards ===
The APRA Awards are presented annually from 1982 by the Australasian Performing Right Association (APRA), "honouring composers and songwriters".

Year	Nominee / work	Award	Result
2017	"The Pain" (Robbie Miller, Nathan Morrison)	Blues & Roots Work of the Year	Won
2022	"Catch Me"	Most Performed Blues and Root Work	Nominated

=== National Indigenous Music Awards ===
The National Indigenous Music Awards (NIMA) recognise excellence, dedication, innovation and outstanding contribution to the Northern Territory music industry.

Year	Nominee / work	Award	Result
National Indigenous Music Awards 2013	"himself"	Triple J Unearthed National Indigenous Winner	Won
