= Robyn Green =

Robyn Green may refer to:

- Robyn MacPhee (born 1983), also known as Robyn Green, Canadian curler
- Robyn Green (singer), Australian gospel singer

== See also ==
- Robin Green (born 1945), American writer and producer
- Robin Green (politician), member of the Connecticut House of Representatives
