= National Indigenous Music Awards 2010 =

Annual Australian music awards ceremony

- Date: 28 August 2010
- Venue: Northern Territory, Australia

Highlights
- Most wins: Garrangali (3)
- Website: nima.musicnt.com.au

The National Indigenous Music Awards 2010 were the seventh annual National Indigenous Music Awards. It was broadcast on ABC Local Radio NT.

The nominations were announced on 5 August 2010 and awards ceremony was held on 28 August 2010.

Music NT Manager, Mark Smith said "These awards are an important platform to increase understanding and awareness of contemporary and traditional Aboriginal music and culture. There is benefit for all Territorians as we strive to achieve economic independence for musicians as well as flow-on tourism in a region of Australia which has the highest population percentage of practitioners and music production in the country".

== Performers ==
- Warren H. Williams
- The Tableland Drifters
- The Saltwater Band featuring Gurrumul Yunupingu

== Hall of Fame Inductee ==
- Kumanjayi Murphy

== Special Recognition Award ==
- Ali Mills - For significant contribution to the Indigenous Music Scene.

== Awards ==
Act of the Year

Artist	Result
Jessica Mauboy	Nominated
Warren H. Williams	Nominated
Geoffrey Gurrumul Yunupingu	Won

Emerging Act of the Year

Artist	Result
Wildflower	Won

Album of the Year

Artist and album	Result
Ali Mills - Waltjim Bat Matilda	Nominated
Garrangali - Garrangali	Won
Warren H. Williams - Looking Out	Nominated
Brian Murphy and the Band Nomadics	Nominated

DVD/Film Clip of the Year

Artist and song	Result
Gurrumul Geoffrey Yunupingu – "History"	Won

Song of the Year

Artist and song	Result
Garrangali – "Searights"	Won

Artwork of the Year

Artist and album	Result
Garrangali - Garrangali	Won

Traditional Music Award

Artist and song	Result
Mulka Project & Dhuwa Dhapi – "Sea Rights Bungul"	Won

School Band of the Year

Artist and song	Result
Seven Star Band, Yirrkala	Won
