= Nardi Simpson =

Indigenous Australian writer and musician

- Born: 1975 (age 50–51); Sydney, New South Wales, Australia
- Occupations: Novelist and musician
- Writing career
- Notable work: Song of the Crocodile
- Notable awards: ALS Gold Medal 2021; Queensland Literary Award for Fiction 2021

Nardi Simpson (born 1975) is an Aboriginal Australian musician and writer of the Yuwaalaraay people. She is a founding member of the Indigenous folk group Stiff Gins. Her debut novel, Song of the Crocodile, was published in 2020.

== Early life and education ==
Nardi Simpson was born in Sydney in 1975. Her family is Yuwaalaraay from New South Wales, and she spent a significant portion of her childhood visiting the area.

After attending Eora College, she graduated from the University of Sydney with a bachelor's degree in Aboriginal studies.

== Music ==
Simpson has been a musician for over two decades. She is a founding member of the Indigenous folk group Stiff Gins, which she co-founded in 1999. The group has produced several recordings, starting with their debut EP Soh Fa in 1999 and their debut album Origins in 2001. She is also the founder of the Sydney-based Barayagal Choir.

In addition to performing, she is also a composer, described by ABC as "one of the most exciting Australian composers of her generation." She is currently pursuing a Ph.D. in composition from the Australian National University. In 2019 she began participating in the Ngarra Burria First Nations Composers Initiative.

== Writing ==
In 2018, Simpson won the State Library of Queensland's black&write! Writing Fellowship for the manuscript of her debut novel, Song of the Crocodile, which was published in 2020 by Hachette Australia. Song of the Crocodile tells the story of three generations of women in the same family navigating tensions between Indigenous and settler families as their town grows, incorporating musical elements and the Yuwaalaraay language. Simpson has also written journal articles, including for the Griffith Review.

The novel received significant recognition, including being longlisted for the Stella Prize and Miles Franklin Award, and shortlisted for the Victorian Premier's Literary Award for Indigenous Writing and The Age's book of the year. It was the winner of the 2021 ALS Gold Medal and the 2021 University of Queensland Fiction Book Award.

Her second novel, The Belburd, was published in 2024. It brings together the story of an Indigenous poet in present-day Sydney and the stories of late-18th-century figures in the same area.

Simpson wrote the introduction to Ruby Langford Ginibi's best-selling and seminal work of Indigenous memoir, Don't Take Your Love to Town, which was reprinted in 2023 as part of the University of Queensland Press' First Nations Classics series. The series showcases several Unaipon Award winners, and is inspired by the richness and cultural importance of First Nations Australians writing.

== Awards ==
Year	Work	Award	Category	Result	Ref.
2021	Song of the Crocodile	The Age Book of the Year Awards	Fiction	Shortlisted	
2021	Song of the Crocodile	ALS Gold Medal	—	Won	
2021	Song of the Crocodile	Indie Book Awards (AUS)	Debut Fiction	Shortlisted	
2021	Song of the Crocodile	Miles Franklin Award	—	Longlisted	
2021	Song of the Crocodile	MUD Literary Prize	—	Shortlisted	
2021	Song of the Crocodile	NSW Premier's Literary Awards	UTS Glenda Adams Award	Shortlisted	
2021	Song of the Crocodile	Queensland Literary Awards	Fiction Book Award	Won	
2021	Song of the Crocodile	Readings Prize	New Australian Fiction	Shortlisted	
2021	Song of the Crocodile	Stella Prize	—	Longlisted	
2021	Song of the Crocodile	Victorian Premier's Literary Awards	Indigenous Writing	Shortlisted	
2021	Song of the Crocodile	Voss Literary Prize	—	Shortlisted	
2022	Song of the Crocodile	International Dublin Literary Award	—	Longlisted	

== Bibliography ==
=== Novels ===
- —— (2020). Song of the Crocodile (paperback 1st ed.). Hachette Australia. ISBN 9780733643743.
- —— (2024). The Belburd (paperback ed.). Hachette. ISBN 9780733647963.
