= Deadly Awards 2000 =

Australian Aboriginal and Torres Strait Islander annual music awards

The Deadlys Awards 2000, were an annual celebration of Australian Aboriginal and Torres Strait Islander achievement in music, sport, entertainment and community.

== Music ==
- Excellence In Film or Theatrical Score: Wesley Enoch - The Sunshine Club
- Outstanding Contribution to Aboriginal Music: Tiddas
- Most Promising New Talent: Stiff Gins
- Male Artist of the Year: Troy Cassar-Daley
- Female Artist of the Year: Ruby Hunter
- Album Release of the Year: Yothu Yindi - Garma
- Single Release: Christine Anu - "Sunshine On A Rainy Day"
- Band of the Year: NoKTuRNL

== Community ==
- Aboriginal Broadcaster of the Year: Grant Hansen 3CR 855am/3 K'N'D
