= South West Syndicate =

- Also known as: SWS
- Origin: Sydney, New South Wales, Australia
- Genres: Australian hip-hop
- Years active: 1992–2003
- Past members: Munkimuk; Brothablack; Nasri Basal (Big Naz); Darren Stacey (Dax); Les Daniel; Nadeena Dixon; Terrance Murphy; Kider; Ebony Williams; Mohammed Abdullah; Danielle Tuwai; Phillip Pelia; Safwan Barbour; Fadi Chami

South West Syndicate were an Australian hip-hop collective from Sydney formed in 1992. They are made up of Aboriginal, Lebanese-Australian, Pacific Islander, Croatian, German and Anglo hip hop artists. Core members include Munkimuk, Brothablack, Nasri Basal (Big Naz), Darren Stacey (Dax) with additional members Nadeena Dixon, Terrance Murphy, Kider, Ebony Williams, Danielle Tuwai, Mohammed Abdullah, Phil Pelia, Safwan Barbour and Fadi Chami.

South West Syndicate won a Deadly in 2003 for Most Promising New Talent in Music.

South West Syndicate have played at many events including Hip Hopera 1995, Survival, Sydney Writers' Festival, NAIDOC Week, Arafura Games, Bankstown Festival, Bankstown Carnivale, Newtown Festival, Rock Against Racism, Asia-Pacific Conference, Youth Week, Corroboree 2000, Mascon Festival, Barunga Festival and Pacific Wave Festival.
