= Ntaria Choir =

- Also known as: Hermannsburg Choir. Ntaria Ladies Choir
- Origin: Hermannsburg, Northern Territory, Australia
- Labels: CAAMA Music; ABC Classics

Ntaria Choir, formerly known as Ntaria Ladies Choir, Hermannsburg Ladies Choir, Hermannsburg Choir, and various other names, is a choir of Australian Aboriginal people from Hermannsburg in Central Australia. The members of the choir are Arrernte people from the area and they sing a mixture of English, Arrente, and Pitjantjatjara.

It was initially a much larger church choir, and became a women-only choir from the 1970s to sometime in the 2010s. As a female choir, they have performed as part of the Central Australian Aboriginal Women's Choir (CAAWC).

== History ==
The choir has its roots in work done by Lutheran pastors Kempe and Schwartz in 1887. They created an Arrernte language hymn book, transcribing 53 hymns into Western Arrernte. The congregation learnt to sing them, and a choir was born. Singing was always an important part of the church activities, and there were many versions of the choir over the years. German-born pastor Carl Strehlow was the choirmaster in the early years.

In the 1920s, the Hermannsburg teacher's wife, a Mrs Heinrich, taught some of the residents how to sing in harmony.

The choir was a large mixed-sex choir until the 1970s, and artist Albert Namatjira may have sung with the choir in the 1950s. In January 1956 the Hermannsburg choir travelled interstate for the first time, travelling to South Australia with conductor David Trudinger, where they recorded The Heart of Aranda.

=== 1967 tour and album ===
In September 1967, the 24-person choir, half men and half women, toured South Australia and Victoria, on a trip planned to coincide with the 90th anniversary of Hermannsburg. On this trip, Pastor Doug Radke was conductor, and Aboriginal country music singer Gus Williams acted as compère and lead singer, together recording Hermannsburg Choir on Tour 1967. They performed at Adelaide Town Hall (the highlight of the tour, for the choir) Bethlehem Lutheran Church, and other venues, which included several churches and schools. In total they were seen by around 12,000 people at 13 concerts in Adelaide and regional towns in the two states. The tour has been long remembered by Hermannsburg residents, and Radke commented that it resembled a "missionary venture... in reverse", educating non-Indigenous southerners in Christian ways towards "the strangers of our society - the aborigines [sic]".

Radke and his wife, Olga Radke, who had been organist and accompanist on the tour, left the mission in 1969 to work at other Lutheran churches.

From the 1970s, the choir became a women-only choir, becoming known as Ntaria Ladies Choir or Hermannsburg Ladies Choir.

=== 21st century ===
In May 2003, The choir performed with the Sydney Symphony, with the performance recorded by ABC Classic.

In 2015, the choir travelled overseas as part of the Central Australian Aboriginal Women's Choir (CAAWC), at the invitation of a Lutheran church in Bavaria, Germany, to perform at the Kirchentag festival in Stuttgart. This is a major biennial event in the Protestant church calendar that attracts around 100,000 visitors. The CAAWC group also toured around Australia in 2016.

On 3 May 2019, the choir sang songs by Bach when they performed on the opening night concert of the Canberra International Music Festival, under choirmaster David Roenfeldt. They subsequently gave performances in the foyer of Parliament House; at the National Museum of Australia; and at the National Gallery of Australia.

== Choirmasters ==
Former choirmasters include pastors Carl Strehlow and Paul Albrecht, Aboriginal country music singer Gus Williams, and, in the 2010s, David Roenfeldt.

== In books and films ==
In 2003 the choir was the subject of Andrew Schultz's documentary Journey to Horseshoe Bend (aka Cantata Journey), which tells the story of their performance with the Sydney Symphony in May of that year.

In 2005 the choir were featured in An Aural Map Of Australia, a documentary profiling experimental artist and violinist Jon Rose.

The 2015 trip to Stuttgart with CAAWC became the subject of a documentary film called The Song Keepers (2017), directed by Naina Sen and produced by Sen, Trisha Morton-Thomas and others. The film showed at the 2017 Melbourne International Film Festival, won an ATOM Award, and was nominated for several awards.

In 2021, Olga Radke published a book about the 1967 tour, entitled Hermannsburg Choir on Tour - Remembering the 1967 Choir Tour. The book includes her original detailed "Choir Tour Diary", and a CD of digitally remastered music was released at the same time. David Roenfeldt prepared the re-release of the digitally remastered music of the 1967 tour to accompany Olga Radke's 2021 book.

== Present composition ==
The choir is now called Ntaria Choir, and once again includes men. As of 2020 there were eight people in the choir, who sing in Western Arrarnta and Pitjantjatjara; they are Marion Swift, Clarabelle Swift, David and Lily Roennfeldt, Sonya Braybon, Genise Williams, Damien Williams and Nicholas Williams.

== Discography ==
- Tjina Kngarra (the Best of Friends) (2011) – Tracks of the Desert Inc
- Journey to Horseshoe Bend (2004)
- Ekarlta nai! (1999) – Tracks of the Desert Inc
- Arrente Christmas Carols (1988) – Imparja
- Hermannsburg Aranda Ladies Choir (1985) – Imparja
