= Lajamanu Teenage Band =

Australian rock band

- Origin: Lajamanu, Australia
- Genres: Rock
- Label: CAAMA
- Members: Alfred Rose - Vocals, Guitar; Kenneth Martin - Vocals, Guitar; Terry Banjo - Electric & Acoustic Guitar; Manuel Herbet - Drums; Asmen Pelasco - Keyboards; Cedric King - Bass Guitar, Keyboard; Mervyn Donald - Drums; Darren Penn - Bass

Lajamanu Teenage Band are a rock band from Lajamanu, a town located about 600 km to the north of Yuendumu. The members are Warlpiri and their songs are sung in Warlpiri and English. They are popular in the Aboriginal communities. Their album Vision was nominated for an ARIA Award for Best World Music Album.

== Discography ==
=== Albums ===
Title	Details	Peak positions
Title	Details	AUS
Echo Voices	Released: 1995; Label: CAAMA Music; Formats: CD	—
Vision	Released: 1998; Label: CAAMA Music (CAAMA 314); Formats: CD	—
Dreamtime Hero	Released: 2004; Label: CAAMA Music; Formats: CD, digital	—
Prisoner	Released: 2006; Label: CAAMA Music; Formats: CD, digital	—
Live in Katherine	Released: November 2012; Label: CAAMA Music; Formats: CD, digital	—

== Awards and nominations ==
=== ARIA Music Awards ===
The ARIA Music Awards is an annual awards ceremony that recognises excellence, innovation, and achievement across all genres of Australian music. They commenced in 1987.

Year	Nominee / work	Award	Result	Ref.
1999	Vision	Best World Music Album	Nominated	

=== National Indigenous Music Awards ===
The National Indigenous Music Awards (NIMA) (formally NT Indigenous Music Awards) recognise excellence, dedication, innovation and outstanding contribution to the Northern Territory music industry. It commenced in 2004.

Year	Nominee / work	Award	Result	Ref.
2012	Lajamanu Teenage Band	Hall of Fame	inducted	
