= National Indigenous Music Awards 2012 =

Australian music award

- Date: 11 August 2012
- Venue: The Amphitheatre Botanical Gardens, Northern Territory, Australia

Highlights
- Most wins: The Medics (3)
- Website: nima.musicnt.com.au

The National Indigenous Music Awards 2012 were the ninth annual National Indigenous Music Awards.

The nominations were announced on 20 July 2012 and the awards ceremony was held on 11 August 2012.

== Performers ==
- Troy Cassar-Daley
- Warren H. Williams and The Warumungu Songmen
- The Medics with Bunna Lawrie
- Yabu Band
- East Journey
- Sunrize Band
- Lajamanu Teenage Band
- Thelma Plum - "Blowin' in the Wind"

== Hall of Fame Inductees ==
- Jimmy Little, Sunrize Band & Lajamanu Teenage Band

Jimmy Little (a.k.a. Dr James Oswald Little) (1 March 1937 – 2 April 2012) was an Australian Aboriginal musician, actor and teacher from the Yorta Yorta people and was raised on the Cummeragunja Reserve. At the ARIA Music Awards of 1999, Little won the ARIA Award for Best Adult Contemporary Album and was inducted into the ARIA Hall of Fame.

Sunrize Band are a rock band from the remote community of Maningrida in the Arnhem Land. They were the first band signed to Triple J's record label.

Lajamanu Teenage Band are a rock band from Lajamanu. Their songs are sung in Warlpiri and English and at the ARIA Music Awards of 1999, the band were nominated for the ARIA Award for Best World Music Album.

== G.R. Bururrawanga Memorial Award ==
- East Journey

== Triple J Unearthed National Indigenous Winner ==
- Thelma Plum (The inaugural Triple J Unearthed National Indigenous Winner)

Thelma Plum, born on 21 December 1994 is a Gamilaraay woman from Delungra. Plum uploaded the songs "Blackbird" and "Father Said" onto Triple J Unearthed in May 2012.

== Awards ==
Artist of the Year

Artist	Result
Busby Marou	Nominated
Troy Cassar-Daley	Nominated
Jessica Mauboy	Nominated
The Black Arm Band	Nominated
Geoffrey Gurrumul Yunupingu	Won

Best New Talent of the Year

Artist	Result
Dewayne Everttsmith	Nominated
Impossible Odds	Nominated
The Medics	Won

Album of the Year

Artist and album	Result
Busby Marou - Busby Marou	Nominated
Troy Cassar-Daley - Home	Nominated
Shellie Morris & The Borroloola Songwomen - Ngambala Wiji Li-Wunungu – Together We Are Strong	Nominated
The Medics - Foundations	Won
Warren H. Williams & The Warumungu Songmen - Winanjjara : The Song Peoples Sessions	Nominated

Film Clip of the Year

Artist and song	Result
East Journey – "Ngarrpiya"	Won

Song of the Year

Artist and song	Result
Busby Marou -	Nominated
Dewayne Everttsmith - "It's Like Love"	Nominated
East Journey -	Nominated
John Bennett -	Nominated
Geoffrey Gurrumul Yunupingu & Sarah Blasko – "Bayini"	Nominated
Impossible Odds -	Nominated
Last Kinection -	Nominated
The Medics – "Griffin"	Won

Cover Art of the Year

Artist and album	Result
East Journey – "Ngarrpiya"	Nominated
Geoffrey Gurrumul Yunupingu & Sarah Blasko – "Bayini"	Won

Traditional Song of the Year

Artist and song	Result
Shellie Morris and the Borroloola Songwomen - "Ngambala Wiji Li-Wunungu"	Won
Warren H Williams and the Warumungu Songmen - "Winanjjara"	Won

NT School Band of the Year

Artist and song	Result
NEAL Boys - Yirrkala CEC	Won
