= Dani Young =

- Origin: Sydney, Australia
- Genre: Country music
- Instruments: Singer, guitar
- Label: ABC Music
- Website: Official website

Dani Young (born as "Danielle Young" in Sydney, Australia) is a Golden Guitar-nominated Australian singer-songwriter, best known for her country duet album Desert Water released in 2016 with Warren H Williams. Williams and Young are the first 'black' (Indigenous) and 'white' (non-Indigenous) country music duo from Australia to record in Nashville.

Desert Water is Young's first album, and debuted at #2 on the ARIA Country Albums Chart in Australia, and #71 on ARIA's all-genres chart based on sales volumes. The album also produced Young's first major award nomination, receiving recognition at the 2017 CMAA Golden Guitars in the Best Group or Duo category alongside Warren H Williams.

Desert Water has been added to the National Library of Australia.

== Early life ==
Born in Sydney, Australia, Young graduated from the University of Sydney with a Bachelor of Arts (Media and Communications) in 2013 before moving to Alice Springs as a video journalist at the Central Australian Aboriginal Media Association in 2014. There she began her songwriting partnership with Warren H Williams.

== Music career ==
In May 2015, Young won "Best Young Jazz Act" at the Northern Territory Jazz and Blues Festival, and performed with James Morrison & Hot Horn Happening in Alice Springs.

Young appeared as a featured artist on renowned Australian rock band Gang Gajang's single "Circles In The Sand" alongside Williams in March 2016, singing in Western Aranda language. The music video became the first clip to be filmed in front of Uluru with permission from the traditional owners.

Williams & Young recorded Desert Water in Nashville, Tennessee with producer Billy Yates, and the album was released through ABC Music on 22 July 2016. The album features 11 original songs written by Williams & Young, plus a cover of Noel Haggard's One Lifetime. It also features guest vocals from Grammy-winner Jim Lauderdale, who Young met while appearing on an episode of Music City Roots in Franklin, Tennessee. The album took less than a year to write, record and produce.

The lead single "Two Ships" spent 6 weeks at #1 on Tamworth Country Radio, and peaked at number 9 on the national airplay chart. The song was 88.9 Tamworth Radio's number one song on the yearly top 20 for 2016. The film clip for "Two Ships", directed by Duncan Toombs, peaked at number 19 on the Country Music Channel's Top 30.

== Television appearances ==
In 2016, Dani Young and Warren H Williams were featured in an episode of Living Black called 'Ntaria to Nashville', jointly produced by SBS and NITV. The episode followed their songwriting journey from Williams' remote hometown of Ntaria in Central Australia, through to the recording studio in Nashville, and on to their first performances at the 2016 Tamworth Country Music Festival.

Williams and Young also appeared on NITV's special coverage of the 2016 National Indigenous Music Awards.

Young has previously appeared on Carols In The Domain between 2002 and 2007 as a backup singer and dancer for stars such as Tim Campbell, Adam Harvey, Leo Sayer and Jimmy Barnes.

== Discography ==
=== Studio albums ===
Title	Album details	Peak chart positions	
Title	Album details	AUS	AUS Country
Desert Water (Warren H Williams & Dani Young)	Release date: 22 July 2016; Label: ABC Music; Format: CD, digital download	71	2

=== Singles ===
- "Circles In The Sand" - Gang Gajang (featuring Warren H Williams & Dani Young) from GANGgajang (Remastered)
- "Two Ships" - Warren H Williams & Dani Young from Desert Water
