= National Indigenous Music Awards =

Awards for Indigenous Australian music

- Current: National Indigenous Music Awards 2025
- Awarded for: The National Indigenous Music Awards recognise excellence, innovation and leadership among Aboriginal and Torres Strait Islander musicians from throughout Australia.
- Country: Australia
- Presented by: MusicNT
- First award: 2004; 22 years ago
- Website: nima.musicnt.com.au

Television/radio coverage
- Network: National Indigenous Television

The National Indigenous Music Awards (NIMA), also known as the NT Indigenous Music Awards from 2004 to 2008, are music awards presented to recognise excellence, innovation and leadership among Aboriginal and Torres Strait Islander musicians in Australia.

== History ==
The inaugural event was held in 2004, launched as the NT Indigenous Music Awards. In 2008 the awards went national and were renamed the National Indigenous Music Awards.

Just a couple of weeks before the scheduled date of the 2021 event on 7 August, it was announced that it would be postponed until later in the year, due to the COVID-19 pandemic flaring in New South Wales.

In 2025, the event began a partnership with YouTube and the ceremony was livestreamed globally on the platform.

== Description ==
The National Indigenous Music Awards are awarded during the Darwin Festival and run by MusicNT in association with the Northern Territory Government. They recognise excellence, innovation and leadership among Aboriginal and Torres Strait Islander musicians from throughout Australia. The Awards are presented at a special event in August as part of the Darwin Festival in Darwin, Northern Territory, and feature the best of Indigenous music talent.

== Eligibility and categories ==
To be eligible, the associated release or achievement must have taken place from July (the year prior) to June (the year of the awards).

The categories have changed over the years, but the main categories in the ceremony include Artist/Act of the Year, Album of the Year, Song of the Year, Film clip of the Year and Best New Talent/Emerging Talent, as well as an inductee into the Hall of Fame.

== Unearthed NIMAs Competition ==
Radio station Triple j runs the Unearthed National Indigenous Music Awards Competition to select an emerging Indigenous artist to play at the Awards. Winners have included Dallas Woods, Thelma Plum, Baker Boy, Alice Skye, Kuren, and Tilly Tjala Thomas.

== Awards by year ==
To see the full article for a particular year, please click on the year link.

| Year | Artist of the Year | Album of the Year | Song of the Year | Hall of Fame Inductee | Ref |
|---|---|---|---|---|---|
| 2004 | male: Warren H. Williams female: Shellie Morris band: Yothu Yindi | —N/a | —N/a | George Rrurrambu and Mandawuy Yunupingu | |
| 2005 | male: Geoffrey Gurrumul Yunupingu female: Shellie Morris band: Nabarlek | Yilila - Manila, Manila | Yilila - "Mijiyanga" | Kathy & David Mills, The Mystics, Dick Mununggu, Gus Williams, Auriel Andrew, Mr. Yamma Snr and Herbie Laughton | |
| 2006 | Yilila | Tom E. Lewis – Sunshine After Rain | Warren H. Williams - "Learn My Song" | Warumpi Band and Soft Sands | |
| 2007 | Jessica Mauboy | Nabarlek - Manmoyi Radio | Terrah Guymala - "Little Journey to Manmoyi" | Betty Fisher, Barry Benning | |
| 2008 | Geoffrey Gurrumul Yunupingu | Geoffrey Gurrumul Yunupingu - Gurrumul | Geoffrey Gurrumul Yunupingu - "Wiyathul" | Peter Miller and Blek Bala Mujik, Mark Raymond and the Kulumindini Band | |
| 2009 | Geoffrey Gurrumul Yunupingu | Jessica Mauboy - Been Waiting | Jessica Mauboy - "Running Back" | Sammy Butcher, Tableland Drifters and David Asera | |
| 2010 | Geoffrey Gurrumul Yunupingu | Garrangali – Garrangali | Garrangali – "Searights" | Kumanjayi Murphy | |
| 2011 | Geoffrey Gurrumul Yunupingu | Geoffrey Gurrumul Yunupingu – Rrakala | Geoffrey Gurrumul Yunupingu and Blue King Brown – "Gathu Mawula" | Coloured Stone, No Fixed Address | |
| 2012 | Geoffrey Gurrumul Yunupingu | The Medics – Foundations | The Medics – "Griffin" | Jimmy Little, Sunrize Band & Lajamanu Teenage Band | |
| 2013 | Jessica Mauboy | Archie Roach – Into the Bloodstream | Shellie Morris and the Borroloola Songwomen – "Waliwaliyangu li-Anthawirriyarra a-Kurija (Saltwater People Song)" | Henry Dan, Wirrinyga Band, Archie Roach | |
| 2014 | Jessica Mauboy | Dan Sultan – Blackbird | Dan Sultan – "The Same Man" | Munkimuk (aka Mark Munk Ross) | |
| 2015 | Jessica Mauboy and Dan Sultan | Briggs - Sheplife | Thelma Plum - "How Much Does Your Love Cost?" | Vic Simms and Blekbala Mujik | |
| 2016 | Geoffrey Gurrumul Yunupingu | Gawurra - Ratja Yaliyali | Briggs, Dewayne Everettsmith & Gurrumul - "The Children Came Back" | Kutcha Edwards | |
| 2017 | Troy Cassar-Daley | Troy Cassar-Daley - Things I Carry Around | A.B. Original feat. Dan Sultan - "January 26" | —N/a | |
| 2018 | Geoffrey Gurrumul Yunupingu | Gurrumul - Djarimirri (Child of the Rainbow) | Gurrumul - "Djarimirri (Child of the Rainbow)" | Roger Knox | |
| 2019 | Baker Boy | Mojo Juju - Native Tongue | Mojo Juju - "Native Tongue" | Tiddas & Wilma Reading | |
| 2020 | Baker Boy | Archie Roach - Tell Me Why | Baker Boy feat JessB - "Meditjin" | Ruby Hunter | |
| 2021 | The Kid Laroi | JK-47 – Made for This | Miiesha – "Damaged" | Kev Carmody | |
| 2022 | Baker Boy | Baker Boy – Gela | King Stingray – "Milkumana" | Gurrumul | |
| 2023 | Budjerah | Thelma Plum – Meanjin | King Stingray – "Let's Go" | Yothu Yindi | |
| 2024 | Barkaa | Dan Sultan – Dan Sultan | 3% – "Our People" | Sammy Butcher | |
| 2025 | Emily Wurramara | Barkaa – Big Tidda | Andrew Gurruwiwi Band – "Once Upon a Time" | Jessica Mauboy | |

== See also ==
- Deadly Awards (1995–2013)
- National Dreamtime Awards (2017–)
- Stompen Ground
- List of Australian Aboriginal musicians
