= Wildflower (band) =

Australian rock/reggae band

- Origin: Mamadawerre, Northern Territory, Australia
- Years active: 2002-
- Label: Skinnyfish Music
- Members: Jean Burrunali; Salome Nabarlambarl; Vanessa Nabarlambarl; Natasha Namundja; Quintina Nagarrgurrba; Dominic Narorrga; Jake Burrunali; Dick Djoggiba; Shaka Burrunali

Wildflower are an Aboriginal rock/reggae band from Mamadawerre, Northern Territory, a remote outstation in Arnhem Land. They sing mostly in the Kunwinjku language and tell traditional stories with lyrics written by mentor Jill Nganjmirra. The band was a Next Crop artist on Triple J in 2006.

== Awards and recognition ==
- 2010 - Emerging Act of the Year, The Burarrwanga Memorial Scholarship Award, National Indigenous Music Awards (NIMA)

== Discography ==
=== Albums ===
| Title | Details |
|---|---|
| Manginburru Bininj | Released: 2009; Label: Skinnyfish Music (SFWF090601); Format: CD |
