= Stiff Gins =

Australian musical group

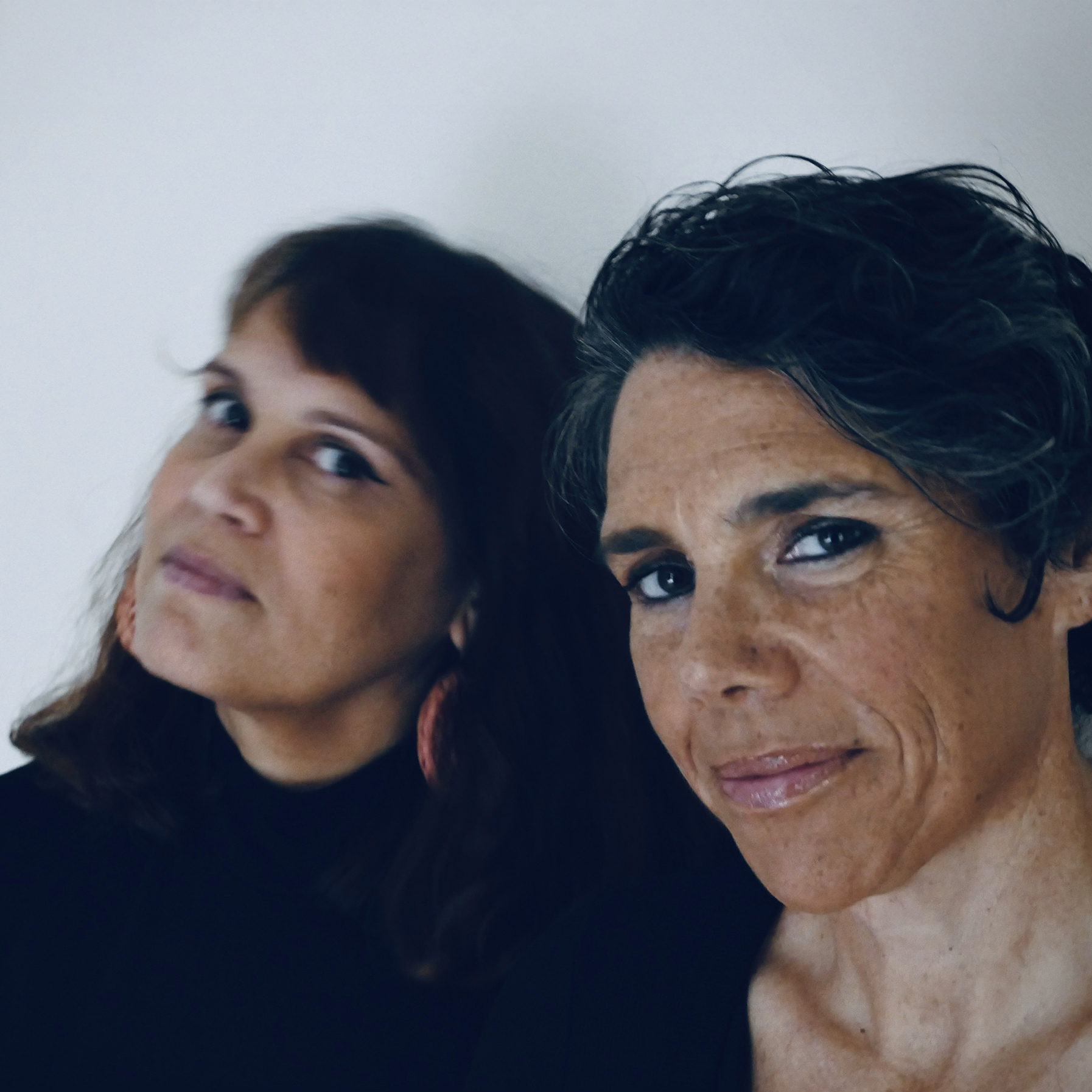

Background information
- Origin: Sydney, New South Wales, Australia
- Genres: World; folk; acoustic
- Years active: 1999–present
- Labels: Sony; Didgeridoo
- Members: Nardi Simpson; Kaleena Briggs
- Past members: Emma Donovan; Seini Taumoepeau; Mihirangi
- Website: stiffgins.com.au

The Stiff Gins are an Indigenous Australian band from Sydney consisting of Wiradjuri/Yorta Yorta woman Kaleena Briggs and Yuwaalaraay woman Nardi Simpson and are renowned as Australia's foremost and longest-performing all-Indigenous female group.

They call their music "acoustic with harmonies" and are regularly compared to Tiddas. The band was formed by Nardi Simpson and Kaleena Briggs Emma Donovan in 1999, after meeting at the Eora Centre while studying music. The band's name uses the word gin (a derogatory word for an Aboriginal woman which was also a Dharug word for woman/wife) with the word stiff to become strong black woman, a name which caused debate about use of the word gin.

The band won Deadlys in 2000 for Most Promising New Talent and in 2001 for their single "Morning Star".

In 2012 Stiff Gins performed at TEDx Sydney, simulcast by ABC Radio.

In 2016 Stiff Gins, with Lucy Simpson, Felix Cross and Syd Green, created Spirit of Things, new works exploring the dispossession and spiritual repatriation of Indigenous cultural objects held in museum collections.

In 2025, Stiff Gins released their fourth studio album Crossroads, marking a 25-year career point for Australia's longest-performing all-female First Nations band.

== Discography ==
=== Albums ===
| Title | Details |
|---|---|
| Origins | Released: 2001; Label: Stiff Gins (SGO2500); Format: CD |
| Kingia Australis | Released: 2004; Label: Didgeridoo records; Format: CD |
| Wind & Water | Released: March 2011; Label: Gadigal Music (GAD006); Format: CD, DD |
| Crossroads | Released: June 2025; Format: Digital download |

=== Extended plays ===
| Title | Details |
|---|---|
| Soh Fa | Released: 2000; Label: Stiff Gins (TSG500); Format: CD |

== Awards and nominations ==
=== Deadly Awards ===
The Deadly Awards, commonly known simply as "The Deadlys", was an annual celebration of Australian Aboriginal and Torres Strait Islander achievement in music, sport, entertainment and community. The awards ran from 1995 until funding cuts lead to their cancellation in 2014.

| Year | Nominee / work | Award | Result |
|---|---|---|---|
| Deadly Awards 2000 | Stiff Gins | Most Promising New Talent | Won |
| Deadly Awards 2001 | "Morning Star" by Stiff Gins | Best Single Release | Won |

=== NSW Music Prize ===
The NSW Music Prize aims to "celebrate, support and incentivise" the NSW's most talented artists, with "the aim of inspiring the next generations of stars". It commenced in 2025.

| Year | Nominee / work | Award | Result | Ref. |
|---|---|---|---|---|
| 2025 | Crossroads | NSW First Nations Music Prize | Nominated | |

=== National Indigenous Music Awards ===
The National Indigenous Music Awards is an annual awards ceremony that recognises the achievements of Indigenous Australians in music. The award ceremony commenced in 2004. Electric Fields have won one award from four nominations.

| Year | Nominee / work | Award | Result | Ref. |
|---|---|---|---|---|
| 2026 | Crossroads | Album of the Year | Nominated | |
