= NT Indigenous Music Awards 2004 =

Indigenous music awards in Northern Territory, Australia

- Date: 28 August 2004
- Venue: Northern Territory, Australia
- Website: nima.musicnt.com.au

The NT Indigenous Music Awards 2004 were the inaugural annual National Indigenous Music Awards, established by MusicNT. The new awards recognise excellence, dedication, innovation and outstanding contributions in the Northern Territory music industry.

Members of the public could nominate a musician or band for the People's Choice Award. The awards ceremony was held on 28 August 2004.

== Performers ==
- The Mills Sisters
- Shellie Morris
- Yothu Yindi
- Nabarlek

== Hall of Fame Inductee ==
- Mandawuy Yunupingu & George Rrurrambu

Mandawuy Yunupingu was inducted into the NT Music Hall of Fame for his 20-year contribution to Indigenous music.

== Awards ==
Male Artist of the Year

Artist	Result
Warren H Williams	Won

Female Artist of the Year

Artist	Result
Shellie Morris	Won

Band of the Year

Artist	Result
Yothu Yindi	Won

Best New Talent of the Year

Artist	Result
Yilila	Won

People's Choice Award

Artist	Result
Saltwater Band	Won

Traditional Music Award

Album	Result
The Rak Badjalarr album	Won

Excellence in Music Industry Training

Artist	Result
Nabarlek	Won
