= Glen Heald =

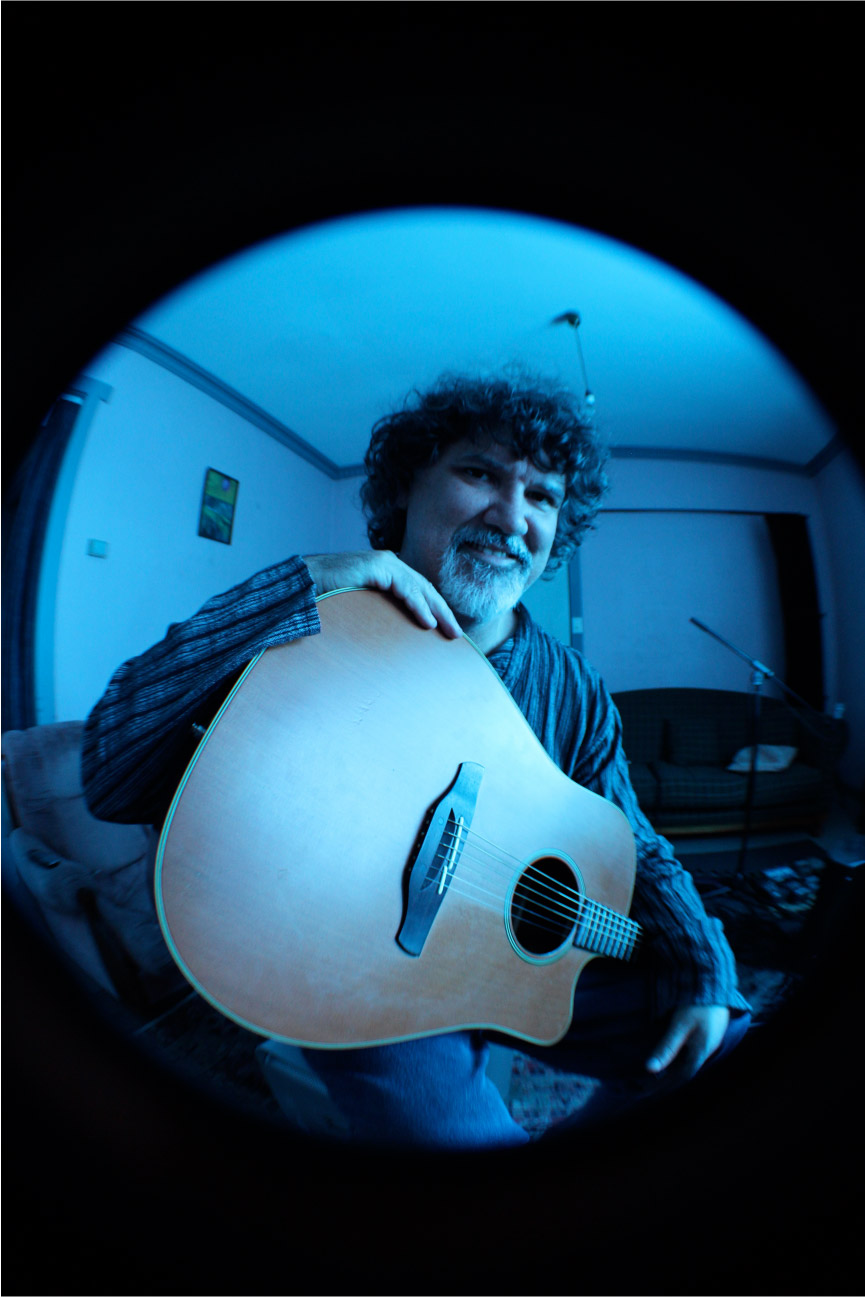

Background information
- Born: 1967 (age 57–58); Tasmania, Australia
- Genres: Hard rock, progressive rock, blues rock, southern rock, blues, Chicago blues, jazz rock, psychedelic rock, folk, folk rock, American folk music
- Occupation(s): Guitarist, singer-songwriter, record producer, audio engineer, music teacher
- Instrument(s): Guitar, slide guitar, acoustic guitar, lap steel, mohan veena, reichel, flute, Chapman Stick, banjo, harmonica, dobro, electric bass, singing
- Years active: 1990–present
- Labels: Independent
- Website: www.glenheald.com

Glen Heald is an Australian guitarist and multi-instrumental singer/songwriter who plays a mix of contemporary rock, fusion, blues, blues rock, folk and acoustic ballads. He is a fully independent Aboriginal recording artist who has written, recorded, and produced eight solo albums.

== Career ==
Glen Heald is a Tasmanian Aboriginal who was born in 1967 and began playing guitar at 13 years of age. He and other students formed their first rock band in high school and began performing professionally from the age of 14.He gained entry on an audition to the University of Tasmania and studied arranging and Jazz improvisation with Jim Lade (US Berklee college of music). After completing an associate degree in music he led the first of many original bands playing Guitar, Flute, Banjo and Harmonica. He recorded his first album in Launceston in 1990 with the "Glen Heald Blues Band".

In 1992 he established and wrote the curriculum for the first fully contemporary music course in Darwin Australia which he coordinated for the next eight years. Teaching live performance, improvisation, musicianship, multitrack recording and live sound. During the 1990s Glen started playing the Hans Reichel guitar (Reichel guitars feature multiple fretboards, unique positioning of pick-ups and 3rd bridges the resulting sounds create unusual harmonics from overtones). Glen was broadcast nationally on JJJ radio performing on the reichel guitar in 1998. In the late 1990s Heald started performing and recording on the Chapman Stick (the stick usually has twelve individually tuned strings and is designed as a fully polyphonic chordal instrument that can cover several musical parts simultaneously).

In 2001 he began performing with the Australian Aboriginal singer songwriter Shellie Morris, recording, co-writing, arranging and producing her debut and second CD Waiting Road nominated for Album of the Year at the 2007 Deadly Awards.

In 2002 Heald wrote the music for the play To the Inland Sea (inspired by Charles Sturt's 19th Century journey to discover the mythical inland sea in the centre of Australia). Glen composed the acoustic music for the Aboriginal film "Merrepen" in 2005. In 2007 he toured Europe with Morris and performed on TV4 Swedish television playing the Chapman Stick to over 6 million viewers. In 2009 he performed on guitar with Shellie Morris at the Sydney Opera house with world-renowned aboriginal musician Gurrumul Yunupingu this was filmed and featured nationally on two episodes of ABC TV's Message Stick program.

In 2008 Glen worked with African refugees from Liberia that had relocated to the Northern Territory in Darwin. He was musical director of the 'Liberty Songs' music project writing, recording and producing the music performed in a musical collaboration between African and Aboriginal musicians. Following this Glen recorded the Darwin African choir. Glen produced the music for the Aboriginal film In a League of Their Own in 2009, which follows Australia's first all-black football team through their first season in the big league.

Heald works with Aboriginal communities and youth throughout Australia helping aboriginal people to produce and recording music about their stories and experiences. He has produced and recorded music and videos for the Fred Hollows Foundation (an organisation undertaking blindness prevention in Australian aboriginal communities) and The Jimmy Little Foundation (established to help improve kidney health in Aboriginal and Torres Strait Islander communities). In addition to this Glen worked for four years in Darwin Correctional Centre as a music teacher helping Aboriginal people record and produce music.

Heald has produced, recorded and released eight studio albums, His self-titled electric rock CD and his album Progressive rock containing some very interesting Chapman Stick performances in odd time signatures. On the self-titled album 'Glen Heald' he sings and plays electric slide guitar in a hard rock or blues rock style. His solos on electric guitar are in the style of Buddy Guy, Jimi Hendrix or Robin Trower. He employs standard drop D, open D major, DADGAD and open G major tunings, for many compositions and sings in a Tom Waits or Captain Beefheart style. Styles range from electric funk to heavy blues rock ballads, with the emphasis on electric guitar players from the power trio era. 2015 saw the release of his fifth electric rock album 'Glen Heald The best of 2010-2015' featuring ten instrumental guitar tracks in a progressive rock format, selected from tracks released on his first four albums. In September 2017 Glen Heald released the acid rock and progressive rock album titled "Marrawah". The album contains many guitar riffs and melodies and sees Glen Heald again performing with his brother Dave Heald on electric bass. The album contains varied material ranging from longer guitar improvisations on slide guitar and resonator guitar, as well as a reggae song highlighting the continued and high incarceration of Australian Aboriginal people. 2018 saw Glen release his first fully acoustic album "Acoustic Guitar Culture. This album is written in DADGAD and open G guitar tunings and is written in a more contemporary folk style. In 2019 Heald released his seventh studio album titled "Electric Guitar Solos" This is an album showcasing Glen's improvisational ability on electric guitar in a three piece power trio format. The songs on the album are modal based but contain elements of the Chicago blues style. Some of the other influences for the album come from guitar players such as Robin Trower, Jimi Hendrix, Frank Zappa, Roy Buchanan and David Gilmour.

== Discography ==
- Glen Heald Guitar (2021)
- Glen Heald Electric Guitar Solos Two (2021)
- Glen Heald Peyote (2020)
- Glen Heald Hell Hound (2020)
- Glen Heald Prog Rock Guitar Vol. 1 (2020)
- Electric Guitar Solos (2019)
- Glen Heald Acoustic Guitar Culture (2018)
- Glen Heald Marrawah (2017)
- Glen Heald Glen Heald The Best of 2010-2015 (2015)
- Glen Heald The Hanged Man (2015)
- Glen Heald Outsider (2013)
- Glen Heald Debut (2010)
- Glen Heald Progressive Rock (2010)
- Shellie Morris & Glen Heald Waiting Road (2006)
- Shellie Morris Debut (2000)
- Aboriginal Soul (2009)

== Performed with ==
Geoffrey Gurrumul Yunupingu, Yothu Yindi, The Waifs, Gangajang, Chris Bailey (The Saints), Shellie Morris, Tom E Lewis, Gondwanaland, Lou Bennett (Tiddas), Steve Prestwich (Cold Chisel), Chris Wilson, Mental as Anything, Things of Stone and Wood, Jimmy Little, Magic Dirt, Neil Murray

Instruments played include electric guitar, lap steel guitar, Chapman Stick, mohan veena, banjo, flute, harmonica, dobro, Hans Reichel guitar, mandolin, and electric bass.
