= Brothablack =

Australian singer

Shannon Narrun Williams, known as Brothablack, is a Sydney-based Indigenous hip hop performer.

Brothablack was a founding member of Deadly Award-winning group South West Syndicate. He has since gone solo and has worked as an MC for The National Indigenous 3on3 Basketball and Hip Hop Challenge, performed at the Big Day Out, and released a solo album More Than A Feeling, an album which is trying to give "non-Indigenous people a good look into an Indigenous males life". In 2007 he teamed up with Hilltop Hoods to create a song for a campaign by reconcile.org.au highlighting Indigenous mortality rates.

He has received extensive airplay on Triple J including performing a set for Live at the Wireless, broadcast on 9 July 2007.

From series 1 to 3, he co-host Move it Mob Style with Naomi Wenitong.

== Discography ==
- More Than A Feeling (2007)
