= Song of the Crocodile =

2020 novel by Australian author Nardi Simpson

- Author: Nardi Simpson
- Language: English
- Genre: Novel
- Publisher: Hachette Australia
- Publication date: 29 September 2020
- Publication place: Australia
- Media type: Print
- Pages: 448 pp.
- ISBN: 9780733643743

Song of the Crocodile is a 2020 novel by the Australian author Nardi Simpson.

It was the winner of the 2021 ALS Gold Medal.

== Synopsis ==
The Australian country town of Darnmoor features a welcoming sign calling it "the Gateway to Happiness", a notion that is only applicable depending on the colour of your skin. The novel follows the Billymil family, who live just outside of town, across three generations, and details the tensions that exist between them and the local white settlers.

== Critical reception ==
Reviewing the novel for Australian Book Review Jane Sullivan called the novel "one of many valuable and sometimes enthralling cross-cultural moments".

In The Saturday Paper Khalid Warsame found in the novel "stunning moments of perfect fluidity and permeability, where Simpson’s deep engagement with the ancestries and cosmology of her people comes through".

== Awards ==
- 2021 ALS Gold Medal – winner
- 2021 Miles Franklin Award – longlisted

== Notes ==
- Dedication: For my ngurrambaa
- Epigraph: 'our initiations continue, the bloodletting flows, the boy comes out and the man begins.' - Max Dulumunmun Harrison

== See also ==
- 2020 in Australian literature
