= The Medics =

Australian rock band

- Origin: Cairns, Queensland, Australia
- Genres: Rock
- Years active: 2007–2012
- Labels: Starving Kids; Footstomp/Warner
- Past members: Jhindu Lawrie; Charles Thomas; Kahl Wallis; Andrew Thomson; Emma Andrews

The Medics were an Australian rock band formed in Cairns, Queensland in 2007. In April 2010 they moved to Brisbane. The band were formed by Emma Andrews, Jhindu Lawrie, Charles Thomas and Kahl Wallis. They later expanded to a five-piece with Andrew Thomson joining. Andrews left the band, reducing it back to four members. They are mentored by Lawrie's father, Coloured Stone's Bunna Lawrie.

They released their self-titled debut extended play in 2008 and followed with a second EP in 2010. The Medics won a Deadly award in 2010 for Band of the Year. They won a Triple J Unearthed competition, getting a spot at the Groovin' the Moo festival in Townsville. The band were featured in the Foxtel documentary, Who We Are, broadcast during NAIDOC Week.

They released their debut album, Foundations, on 18 May 2012, via Footstomp. The album was a featured album on Triple J and reached No. 29 on the Australian ARIA Albums Chart on 28 May 2012.

== Discography ==
=== Albums ===
| Title | Details | Peak chart positions |
| Title | Details | AUS |
|---|---|---|
| Foundations | Released: May 2012; Label: Footstomp (STOMPER004); Format: CD, digital download | 29 |

=== Extended plays ===
| Title | Details |
|---|---|
| The Medics | Released: 2008; Label: Format: digital download |
| This Boat We Call Love | Released: 2010; Label: Format: digital download |

== Awards and nominations ==
=== The Deadly Awards ===
The Deadly Awards, commonly known simply as The Deadlys, was an annual celebration of Australian Aboriginal and Torres Strait Islander achievement in music, sport, entertainment and community. The ran from 1995 to 2013.

| Year | Nominee / work | Award | Result |
|---|---|---|---|
| Deadly Awards 2010 | themselves | Band of the Year | Won |

=== National Indigenous Music Awards ===
The National Indigenous Music Awards recognise excellence, innovation and leadership among Aboriginal and Torres Strait Islander musicians from throughout Australia. They commenced in 2004.

| Year | Nominee / work | Award | Result |
|---|---|---|---|
| 2011 | "Beggars" | Song of the Year | Nominated |
| 2012 | themselves | Best New Talent of the Year | Won |
| 2012 | Foundations | Album of the Year | Won |
| 2012 | "Griffin" | Song of the Year | Won |

=== Queensland Music Awards ===
The Queensland Music Awards (previously known as Q Song Awards) are annual awards celebrating Queensland, Australia's brightest emerging artists and established legends. They commenced in 2006.

| Year | Nominee / work | Award | Result (wins only) |
|---|---|---|---|
| 2011 | "Beggars" | Indigenous Song of the Year | Won |
| 2015 | "Wake Up" | Indigenous Song of the Year | Won |
