= Sunrize Band =

- Origin: Maningrida, Australia
- Labels: ABC Music
- Members: Ben Pascoe; Terry Pascoe; Wayne Kala Kala; Horace Wala Wala; Kenny Smith; Andre Pascoe; Chris Pascoe; Jacky Pascoe; Reece Kala-Kala

Sunrize Band are a rock band from the Northern Territory.

Sunrize Band are from the remote community of Maningrida in the Arnhem Land and were the first band signed to Triple-J's record label. At the National Indigenous Music Awards 2012, they were inducted into the Indigenous Music Hall of Fame.

== Discography ==
Albums

- Check It Out! – Let's Dance (1990)
- Sunset to rize! (1992)
- Lunggurrma (1993) - ABC Music

Singles

- "Lembana Mani Mani" - ABC Music
