= Warren H Williams =

- Born: Warren Hedley Williams; 27 December 1963 (age 62)
- Origin: Ntaria (Hermannsburg), Northern Territory, Australia
- Genre: Aboriginal country music
- Occupations: Singer, songwriter, radio broadcaster
- Instrument: Guitar
- Years active: 1990s–present
- Labels: CAAMA, ABC Music

Warren. H. Williams in Alice Springs, 2011

Warren Hedley Williams (born 27 December 1963) is an Aboriginal Australian singer, musician and songwriter from Ntaria in Central Australia.

Williams has also worked in radio and as an actor and has run as an Australian Greens candidate in the 2010 and 2013 Federal elections.

== Early life ==
Williams was born on 27 December 1963 in Hermannsburg, the son of country musician Gus Williams. He is an Arrernte man.

He started playing guitar at the age of six with his father, and later went to school at a Lutheran college in Adelaide: Immanuel College in Novar Gardens.

== Music career ==
Williams was included on a compilation CD released in 1999 to promote reconciliation in Australia. The album was titled Reconciliation: Stories of the Heart, Sounds of the Rock and included music, personal statements from celebrities, and excerpts from historical speeches and events.

In 2007, he wrote the musical Magic Coolamon, which debuted as the first ever Central Australian Indigenous musical.

Williams toured with John Williamson many times, including "Hillbilly Road" in 2008.

In 2015, Williams invited long-time friend and award-winning Australian singer Shane Nicholson to visit his hometown of Hermannsburg (Ntaria) to help break his writer's block. Williams took him to sacred sites and shared Aboriginal Dreaming stories which inspired Nicholson's ARIA-nominated album Hell Breaks Loose, which features the track 'Hermannsburg'.

In 2016, Williams teamed up with emerging artist Dani Young, writing and recording an album of traditional country duets in Nashville. The album, Desert Water was produced by Billy Yates, and features Jim Lauderdale. The album was released on 22 July 2016. The album debuted at #2 on the ARIA Country albums charts, and the first single "Two Ships" spent six weeks at #1 on Tamworth Country Radio.

== Radio and television career ==
In 1996, Williams was the first remote Indigenous broadcaster (RIBS) on the 8KIN FM network, presenting music shows live from Hermannsburg. He is the longest-serving broadcaster on CAAMA Radio, as of 2015 presenting the mid-morning show from 9am - 11am on weekdays, as well as the 80s Mix on Monday evenings, Rockn on Wednesday evenings, and CAAMA's highest rating program Strictly Country on Tuesday and Thursday evenings. His programs are also played through the National Indigenous Radio Service.

In 2015, Williams made his directorial debut, writing and co-directing for the Aboriginal television series Our Place for ICTV.

== Politics ==
Williams stood as lead Australian Greens candidate for the two Northern Territory seats in the Australian Senate in the 2010 federal election, and again in the 2013 federal election.

At the 2012 Northern Territory election, he stood for the Australia's First Nations Political Party in the seat of Namatjira. On the day before the election, he commented that the Country Liberals had gone too far in using vicious personal attacks at the polling places, which they shouted in Aboriginal language to avoid being removed by poll officials. Williams claimed that the attacks were part of a systematic campaign.

== Discography ==
Title	Details
Western Wind	Released: 1995; Label: CAAMA Music; Format: CD
Country Friends & Me	Released: 1998; Label: CAAMA Music; Format: CD
Where My Heart Is	Released: 2001; Label: CAAMA Music; Format: CD
Places in Between	Released: 2002; Label: CAAMA Music; Format: CD
Be Like Home	Released: 2005; Label: CAAMA Music; Format: CD
Looking Out	Released: 2009; Label: Heartland; Format: CD
Urna Mara	Released: 2011; Label: ABC; Format: CD
Winanjjara (with The Warumunga Songmen)	Released: 2011; Label: Heartland; Format: CD
Desert Water (with Dani Young)	Released: June 2016; Label: UMA; Format: CD
These are the Changes	Released: January 2020; Label: ABC; Format: CD, DD
Undar Werma	Released: January 2027; Label: ABC; Format: CD, DD

== Recognition and awards ==
In 2004, Williams was the subject of an episode of the television series Nganampa Anwernekenhe.

In 2009 he was inducted into the Australian Country Music Hall of Fame. (His father, Gus, had become an inductee in 2000.)

=== AIR Awards ===
The Australian Independent Record Awards (commonly known informally as AIR Awards) is an annual awards night to recognise, promote and celebrate the success of Australia's Independent Music sector.

Year	Nominee / work	Award	Result
2012	Urna Marra	Best Independent Country Album	Nominated

=== ARIA Music Awards ===
The ARIA Music Awards is an annual awards ceremony that recognises excellence, innovation, and achievement across all genres of Australian music. They commenced in 1987.

Year	Nominee / work	Award	Result	Ref.
1998	"Raining on the Rock" (with John Williamson)	Best Indigenous Release	Nominated	
2012	Winanjjara: The Song Peoples Sessions	Best World Music Album	Nominated	

=== Australia Council for the Arts ===
The Australia Council for the Arts is the arts funding and advisory body for the Government of Australia. Since 1993, it has awarded a Red Ochre Award. It is presented to an outstanding Indigenous Australian (Aboriginal Australian or Torres Strait Islander) artist for lifetime achievement.

Year	Nominee / work	Award	Result
2012	himself	Red Ochre Award	Awarded

=== Country Music Awards (CMAA) ===
The Country Music Awards of Australia (CMAA) (also known as the Golden Guitar Awards) is an annual awards night held in January during the Tamworth Country Music Festival, celebrating recording excellence in the Australian country music industry. They have been held annually since 1973.

Year	Nominee / work	Award	Result (wins only)
2008	himself	Hands of Fame	imprinted
2009	"Australia Is Another Word for Free" with John Williamson and Amos Morris	Bush Ballad of the Year	Won

=== Deadly Awards ===
The Deadly Awards, (commonly known simply as The Deadlys), was an annual celebration of Australian Aboriginal and Torres Strait Islander achievement in music, sport, entertainment and community. They ran from 1996 to 2013.

Year	Nominee / work	Award	Result
1998	"Raining on the Rock"	Single of the Year	Won
2001	Where My Heart Is	Album of the Year	Won

=== National Indigenous Music Awards ===
The National Indigenous Music Awards recognise excellence, innovation and leadership among Aboriginal and Torres Strait Islander musicians from throughout Australia. They commenced in 2004.

Year	Nominee / work	Award	Result
2004	himself	Male Artist of the Year	Won
2005	"Dreamtime Baby"	Most Popular Song	Won
2006	"Learn My Song"	Song of the Year	Won
2006	Be Like Home	Best Cover Art	Won
2010	himself	Act of the Year	Nominated
2010	Looking Out	Album of the Year	Nominated
2012	"Winanjjara"	Traditional Song of the Year	Won
2012	Winanjjara: The Song Peoples Sessions	Album of the Year	Nominated
