= Shellie Morris =

Shellie Morris AO
- Genres: Folk music, folk rock, roots revival
- Occupations: Singer, singer/songwriter
- Instruments: Singing, guitar, piano
- Label: independent record label

Shellie Morris AO is an Indigenous Australian singer/songwriter who plays a mix of contemporary folk music and contemporary acoustic ballads.

== Biography and career ==
Shellie Morris was raised in Sydney and began singing at an early age. She often performed in Church choirs in her twenties and in the 1990s Morris moved to Darwin, Northern Territory to find her Indigenous family. She completed a Certificate 3 in Contemporary music at N.T.U in Darwin and then began working with producer/ musician/ songwriter Glen Heald for the next ten years who produced the albums Shellie Morris and Waiting Road.

Morris toured with Yothu Yindi in 2001 and also performed with Neil Murray from the Warumpi Band. In 2002 Shellie Morris and Glen Heald co-wrote and produced the music to the play "To the inland sea" inspired by Charles Sturt's 19th Century journey to discover the mythical inland sea in the center of Australia. Morris was named best female musician at the 2004 and 2005 Northern Territory Indigenous Music Awards and her album Waiting Road was nominated for Album of the Year at the 2007 Deadly Awards. She has been featured nationally on two episodes of ABC TV's Message Stick program, Shellie Morris Swept Away and Shellie Morris in Concert. Shellie also was on the SBS show Rockwiz and once again performed "Swept Away" and also performed a unique version of "Louis Louie" with Ross Wilson.

Shellie Morris works with Indigenous / aboriginal communities and youth throughout Australia helping aboriginal people to write music about their stories and experiences. She has worked in over fifty Indigenous Communities and is an ambassador for the Fred Hollows Foundation (an organisation undertaking blindness prevention in Australian aboriginal communities, Asia, Africa and the Pacific) and an ambassador for The Jimmy Little Foundation (established to help improve kidney health in Aboriginal and Torres Strait Islander communities).

Morris is currently a featured Aboriginal singer with the Black Arm Band. (A collaboration of Australia's top indigenous artists and jazz musicians including artists such as Archie Roach) Her song "Swept Away" was orchestrated and performed in 2008 with the Melbourne Symphony Orchestra. In 2009 Shellie Morris performed at the Sydney Opera house with world-renowned aboriginal musician Gurrumul Yunupingu. Morris also performed and co-wrote the music Liberty Songs with Australian guitarist Glen Heald, a collaboration between refugees from Liberia and indigenous Australian female singers. In 2010 Shellie performed her song "Swept Away" at the opening of the Winter Olympics in Vancouver with the Black Arm Band. In 2011 Morris sang alongside the international music stars Sinéad O'Connor, John Cale, Meshell Ndegeocello, Rickie Lee Jones and aboriginal singer Gurrumul Yunupingu for the show 7 Songs to Leave Behind. Shellie Morris was featured in the Australian film 'Murundak – Songs of freedom' (a feature documentary on Aboriginal protest music following The Black Arm Band From the concert halls of the Sydney Opera House to remote Aboriginal communities of the Northern Territory.)

In 2011 Shellie Morris was chosen by the famous Brazilian singer Gilberto Gil to be included in his film "Viramundo" a transnational voyage of the southern hemisphere that takes Gilberto across the Australian Outback to inner-city Johannesburg and Soweto and on to the Amazon forests. Directed by Pierre-Yves Borgeaud. "The film explores different aspects of the relations between countries of the southern hemisphere," Gil says.

In 2013, she released a song album Ngambala Wiji Li-Wunungu – Together We are Strong, on ABC music with songs in several indigenous languages: Yanyuwa, Marra, Garrwa and Gurdanji. The project won the 2012 National Indigenous Music Award for Traditional Music, the 2012 Music Council of Australia's Music in Communities Award and the 2013 National Indigenous Music Award for Song of the Year for li-Anthawirriyarra a-kurija

== Discography ==
=== Studio albums ===
List of studio albums, with selected details
Title	Album details
Shellie Morris	Released: 2000; Label: Formats: CD, Digital download
Waiting Road (with Glen Heald)	Released: 2006; Label: Skinnyfish Music; Formats: CD, Digital download
Together We Are Strong: The Song People's Sessions (with The Borroloola Songwomen )	Released: 2012; Label: ABC Music (3737072; Formats: 2xCD, Digital download

== Awards and nominations ==
=== Order of Australia ===
Morris was appointed as an Officer of the Order of Australia in the 2023 King's Birthday Honours for "distinguished service to the performing arts, to the Indigenous community, and to not-for-profit organisations".

=== ARIA Music Awards ===
The ARIA Music Awards is an annual awards ceremony that recognises excellence, innovation, and achievement across all genres of Australian music. They commenced in 1987.

Year	Nominee / work	Award	Result	Ref.
2013	Together We Are Strong – Ngambala Wigi Li – Wun the Song Peoples Sessions	Best World Music Album	Nominated	

=== Australian Women in Music Awards ===
The Australian Women in Music Awards is an annual event that celebrates outstanding women in the Australian Music Industry who have made significant and lasting contributions in their chosen field. They commenced in 2018.

Year	Nominee / work	Award	Result
2018	Shellie Morris	Auriel Andrew Memorial Award	Nominated
2025	Shellie Morris	Artistic Excellence Award	Won
2025	Shellie Morris	Lifetime Achievement Award	awarded

=== National Indigenous Music Awards ===
The National Indigenous Music Awards (NIMA) (formally NT Indigenous Music Awards) recognise excellence, dedication, innovation and outstanding contribution to the Northern Territory music industry. It commenced in 2004.

Year	Nominee / work	Award	Result	Ref.
2004	Shellie Morris	Female Artist of the Year	Won	
2005	Shellie Morris	Female Artist of the Year	Won	
2012	Ngambala Wiji Li-Wunungu – Together We Are Strong (with The Borroloola Songwomen)	Album of the Year	Nominated	
2012	"Ngambala Wiji Li-Wunungu" (with The Borroloola Songwomen)	Traditional Song of the Year	Nominated	
2013	Ngambala Wiji Li-Wunungu – Together We Are Strong (with The Borroloola Songwomen)	Album of the Year	Nominated	
2013	"Waliwaliyangu li-Anthawirriyarra a-Kurija (Saltwater People Song)" (with The Borroloola Songwomen)	Song of the Year	Nominated	
2014	Shellie Morris	Artist of the Year	Nominated	
2021	"Dharuk Gurtha" (with Jason Durrurrnga)	Indigenous Language Award	Nominated	

=== Red Ochre Award for Lifetime Achievement ===
Morris received the 2025 Red Ochre Award for Lifetime Achievement for cultural advocacy.

== Philanthropy ==
Morris utilized her renowned career in music to help raise awareness for the Fred Hollows Foundation, becoming one of their distinguished ambassadors. The Fred Hollows Foundation is an international non-profit organization that educates surgeons on how to cure avoidable blindness within underserved communities and countries. Specifically, they work within the Aboriginal and Torres Strait Islander communities of Indigenous Australia.
