= Nabarlek (band) =

Australian rock/reggae band from Northern Australia

- Origin: Manmoyi, Australia
- Genres: Indigenous Roots
- Years active: 1985–present
- Labels: Skinnyfish Music
- Members: Ross Guymala; Terrah Guymula; Stuart Guymala; Rodney Naborlhborlh; Leon Guymala; Marshall Bangarr; Benjamin Buranali; Winston Naborlhborlh; Berribob Watson; Winston Guymala; Lester Guymala; Peter Mylaynga; Garrad Naborlhborlh; Joe Guymala
- Website: http://www.myspace.com/nabarlek

Nabarlek are an Indigenous Roots band from Manmoyi, a tiny community in Arnhem Land, 215 kilometres from the remote community of Gunbalanya. The band formed in 1985 as a group of singers and dancers with a couple of busted guitars and flour tins for drums. The members are Bininj (the indigenous people of West Arnhem Land) and they sing in the Kunwinjku language and in English, trying to reach across the cultures and to pass their knowledge from one generation to another. Their songs are traditional songs of the Kunwinjku people of western Arnhem Land with a rock/reggae arrangement. They call themselves the garage band that never had a garage.

They have performed with the Darwin Symphony Orchestra and Yothu Yindi, supported Midnight Oil and played with Silverchair and Powderfinger on their Across the Great Divide national tour. They played at many music festivals, including several Darwin Festivals, the Adelaide Festival in 2000, and Womadelaide, the Port Fairy and Brunswick Music Festivals in 2001. They played for six weeks at the International World Expo in Hanover, Germany in 2000.

Their album Bininj Manborlh was nominated for the 2002 ARIA Award for Best World Music Album. They also received a nominations for Deadlys in 2001, 2002 and 2007. They are the subject of From outstation to out there. Nabarlek a music industry case study a DVD created by Gillian Harrison.

In 2001 the group featured in the Nganampa Anwernekenhe series, in an episode titled Nabarlek, produced by Central Australian Aboriginal Media Association (CAAMA) Productions and directed by Beck Cole.

In 2011 and 2013 they participated in Regional Arts WA's First Nations contemporary music tour, Sand Tracks. They toured central Australia with supporting act the Sunshine Reggae Band (also known as Tjintu) from Ikuntji in the Northern Territory in 2013, and with Sandridge Band from Boroloola in 2013.

== Discography ==
Title	Details
Munwurrk	Released: 1998; Label: Format: CD
Bininj Manborlh	Released: 2001; Label: SkinnyFish Music; Format: CD
Nabarlek Live	Released: 2003; Label: SkinnyFish Music; Format: CD
Nabarlek Radio	Released: 2007; Label: SkinnyFish Music; Format: CD, DD
Manmoyi Radio	Released: 2010; Label: SkinnyFish Music; Format: CD, DD

== Awards and nominations ==
=== ARIA Music Awards ===
The ARIA Music Awards is an annual awards ceremony held by the Australian Recording Industry Association. They commenced in 1987.

Year	Nominee / work	Award	Result	Ref.
2002	Bininj Manborlh / Blackfella Road	Best World Music Album	Nominated	

=== National Indigenous Music Awards ===
The National Indigenous Music Awards recognise excellence, innovation and leadership among Aboriginal and Torres Strait Islander musicians from throughout Australia. It commenced in 2004.

Year	Nominee / work	Award	Result
2004	Nabarlek	Excellence in Music Industry Training	Won
2005	Nabarlek	Band of the Year	Won
2006	Nabarlek - Nabarlek on Tour	Best DVD Release	Won
2007	Nabarlek - Manmoyi Radio	Album of the Year	Won
2007	Nabarlek - Manmoyi Radio	Artwork & Design of the Year	Won
2007	Nabarlek - "Bushfire"	People's Choice - "Song for Country"	Won
2007	DVD/Film Clip of the Year	Nabarlek - "Brownbird"	Won
