= Mamadawerre, Northern Territory =

Mamadawerre
- Town
- Coordinates: 12°15′22.9″S 133°39′22.0″E
- Country: Australia
- State: Northern Territory
- LGA: West Arnhem Region
- Location: 307 km (191 mi) E of Darwin

Government
  - Territory electorate: Arafura
  - Federal division: Lingiari

Population
  - Total: 33
- Postcode: 0822

Mamadawerre, also known as Mamadawerri and South Gumadeer, is an Aboriginal outstation located in the West Arnhem region of the Northern Territory, Australia. It is located about 307 kilometres (191 mi) east of Darwin, on Kunwinjku land.

Though there was no recorded population at the time of the 2016 census, the settlement may have a seasonally intermittent population of around 15-30 people.
