= Garrangali Band =

Aboriginal Australian musical group

- Origin: East Arnhem Land, Northern Territory, Australia
- Genres: Reggae; ska
- Years active: 2009–present
- Label: Independent
- Members: Brendan Marika; Mudinymudiny Nicholas Guyula; Fabian Dhupilawuy Marika; Warrandan Marawili; Amos Marawili; Paul Mununggurr; Roy Marika; D Marawili; Rico Wanambi; Mululmi; Malngay Yunupingu; Sean Marika
- Past members: Rrawun Mayamuru; I Marawili
- Website: garrangali.com.au

The Garrangali Band, also known as Garrangali, is an Aboriginal Australian musical group from the tiny homeland community, or outstation, of Baniyala in East Arnhem Land in the Northern Territory of Australia. Garrangali means "home of the crocodile" in the Yolngu language, in which they sing some lyrics. Their musical style has been variously described as reggae, saltwater reggae and saltwater ska.

The band came on to the scene in 2009, when they were nominated for the Emerging Artist award at the National Indigenous Music Awards 2009. At the ceremony in 2010 they won two categories: album of the year with their debut, Crocodile Nest, and song of the year for "Sea Rights". Their lyrics focus on their land, Aboriginal culture and Indigenous rights. The group first performed in Sydney in mid-2010 at the Old Manly Boatshed, Manly. The line-up included Community Development Employment Projects (CDEP) participants and/or Yirralka Rangers. In 2018 they performed at the 20th anniversary of the Garma Festival of Traditional Cultures.

On 26 January 2020 (Australia Day) the band performed at the Art Gallery of South Australia as part of one of the Tarnanthi exhibition's Sunday Sessions, along with Electric Fields. In August of that year they released a new song, "One Voice", and prepared for their second album, of the same name. The new tracks display the yidaki and clapsticks (both traditional Aboriginal instruments), and their manikay, which are their clan songlines. "One Voice" is a celebration of the Yolngu people's lifestyle in the Blue Mud Bay area.

In October 2020 Garrangali Band toured Arnhem Land, performing at outstations and larger communities of Maningrida and Ramingining, with their final performance of the tour at Yirrkala. They reached West Arnhem Land and travelled 2,748 km (1,708 mi) on the outward leg of the tour.

As of October 2020 there are 12 members in the band, including keyboards player Makungun Brendan Marika, from Yirrikala, his son Sean Marika on drums, and lead singer Mudiny Nicholas Guyula. The band is managed by Ahva Paul Hayes but operates independently, not being tied to a company.

== Members ==
As of June 2010:

- Mundymudiny Dhamarrandji: – vocals
- Yiniwuy Marawili: – traditional vocals
- Wulkuwulku Marawili: – backing vocals
- Malngay Yunupingu: – yiḏaki, backing vocals
- Wurrandon Marawili: – vocals
- Nambulili Marawili: – backing vocals
- Rakuwarr Wanambi: – drums
- Wurrku Wanambi: – bass guitar
- Watjarrngambi Marawili: – rhythm guitar
- Makungun Marika: – keyboards
- Djulumarr Gurruwiwi: – rhythm guitar
