= Robyn Green (singer) =

Australian gospel singer

Robyn Green is an Australian gospel singer. She released her first album, Here's The Answer, in 1986. She is an influential Indigenous Australian Pentecostal worship leader.

== Discography ==
- He is the Answer (1986)
- Good News (1988)
- Shine On (1992)
- Sweet Surrender (2000)
- Touched by your Love
- Timeless Land (2006)
- I Will Arise (2008)
- Only You (2015)
