= Soft Sands (band) =

Australian musical group

- Origin: Galiwin'ku, Elcho Island, Australia
- Genres: country and gospel
- Years active: 1970-
- Members: Biyarranydjarrwuy Garawirrtja; Murrlanawuy Garawirrtja; Djati Yunupiŋu; Murrlanawuy Garawirrtja; Djirrimbilpilwuy Garawirrtja; Biyarranydjarrwuy Garawirrtja; Djangirrawuy Garawirrtja; Garadhawal Garrawurra; Bakpirr Garawirrtja; Neparrŋa Gumbula; Biyarranydjarrwuy Garawirrtja; Murrlanawuy Garawirrtja; Datjarraŋa Garawirrtja; Boli Garrawurra

Soft Sands is a country and gospel band from Galiwin'ku in Arnhem Land formed in 1970. It was one of the first Arnhem Land bands to incorporate contemporary instruments, music styles and technologies into its music and has had a major influence on the development of popular music in top end. The members are Yolŋu and they sing in English and Yolŋu Matha. Soft Sands was inducted into the Hall of Fame at the 2006 NT Indigenous Music Awards

It has released two self-titled albums. It also accompanied Neparrŋa Gumbula on his unreleased solo album Djiliwirri.

== Discography ==
- Soft Sands (1985) - Imparja
- Soft Sands (2002) - TEABBA
