= Gus Williams (musician) =

- Born: Kasper Gus Ntjalka Williams; 20 June 1937
- Origin: Hermannsburg, Northern Territory, Australia
- Died: 13 September 2010 (aged 73)
- Genre: Aboriginal country music
- Occupation: Singer
- Instrument: Guitar
- Years active: 1960s–1990s
- Labels: CAAMA, ABC Music

Kasper Gus Ntjalka Williams OAM (20 June 1937 – 13 September 2010), known as Gus Williams, was an Aboriginal Australian country music singer who lived in Central Australia. He was known not only for his work in Aboriginal country music, but also as a leader of his people. He created the first electric country band in the Northern Territory, the Warrabri Country Bluegrass Band.

== Biography ==
Kasper Gus Ntjalka Williams was born in Labrapuntja on 20 June 1937 in Alice Springs, in the Northern Territory of Australia, one of 11 children. He was an Arrernte man.

The family moved to the Alice Springs Telegraph Station in 1945, where his mother took up a post as a house governess. Gus did a variety of work in Alice, and also began playing Australian rules football. He played with Central Australian Football League clubs Pioneer, Federal and Rove.

Around 1954, after both parents died when Gus was 17, he and siblings moved to Hermannsburg, in Central Australia, to stay with their grandparents, Johannes and Maria Ntjalka.

In 1958 he married Rhonda Malbunka, and children followed: Serena, Ingrid, Warren, Baydon and Debbie. Warren H Williams became a country music star, and was also inducted into the Country Music Hands of Fame in 2009.

He died on 13 September 2010, and was given a state funeral by the Northern Territory Government. Many tributes were read out in the NT Parliament.

== Career ==
He initially became involved in evangelical Lutheran singing for family reasons; some of his great-uncles were evangelists, and his grandparents were among the first group of Aboriginal people baptised at Hermannsburg Mission. Williams taught his sons guitar, and they all played together as a band. In the mid- to late 1960s, he sang with the church choir under Pastor Doug Radke, becoming its lead singer. In 1967 the Hermannsburg Choir toured to Adelaide, where they performed at the Adelaide Town Hall, as well as 12 other venues in regional South Australia and Victoria, and recorded an album. During the tour, Williams, as compère and lead singer, used his platform to make political statements and to help educate non-Indigenous audiences about Arrernte people and culture. He and his wife also translated a German song of home and travel into Arrernte and performed it on the tour.

His cousin, Albert Namatjira, brought other kinds of music to the community via a gramaphone, and Williams developed a love for Australian country music. Williams formed his first band, Palm Leaves.

In the mid to late 1970s, he toured remote communities with Herbie Laughton, and his sons joined him in the Warrabri Country Bluegrass Band. In 1976 he moved to his mother's country, Ali Curung (formerly Warrabri), becoming CEO of the council there and earning respect as a leader. He also created the first electric country band in the Northern territory, the Warrabri Country Bluegrass Band, and organised the inaugural country music festival, first in Alice Springs and later in Ali Curung.

In 1977, Film Australia made a half-hour documentary film called Country Outcasts, which followed Harry and Wilga Williams, along with Gus Williams, Malcolm "Mac" Silva, and Auriel Andrew as they toured Aboriginal communities in Central Australia. The tour included performances at Alice Springs, Hermannsburg, Papunya, and Yuendumu.

Returning to Hermannsburg in the 1980s, Williams became involved in the land rights movement. Together with others, he led the successful push go get land returned from the Finke River Mission to the Ntaria Land Trust. He became chair/CEO of the Hermannsburg council, a position he held for 30 years.

He released six albums in the 1990s, and in 1993 visited the Tamworth Country Music Festival for the first time. He busked there with the Country Ebony band.

== Other roles ==
Williams was also a member or chair of many other organisations, including ATSIC, the Aboriginal Benefits Fund, the Central Land Council, Central Australian Football League, chair of the Hermannsburg Historical Society, and many others. It was said that Ngurratjuta, an organisation representing the Western Desert, was his favourite.

He met Nelson Mandela, Queen Elizabeth II, and Pope John Paul II.

== Honours ==
- 1983: Medal of the Order of Australia, for service to conservation and the environment
- 2000: Inductee into the Country Music Hands Of Fame in Tamworth
- 2001: Deadly Award for Outstanding Contribution to Aboriginal Music
- 2004: Country Music Centenary Medal from CMAA for service to Australian society through Aboriginal and Torres Strait Islander music
- 2005: Inducted into the hall of fame at the Indigenous Music Awards

== Discography ==
Williams sang on Camp Fire Concert, a souvenir album released by Sundowner Safari Tour Company.

Albums released by Williams are:

- I'm Not Trying To Forget – Ntjalka Music
- My Kind Of Heaven (1993) – Ntjalka Music
- Southern Cross (1993) – Ntjalka Music
- Storm In My Heart – Ntjalka Music
- Straight From The Heart (1992) – Ntjalka Music
- Through The Years (1994) – Hadley Records
