= MusicNT =

MusicNT is a non-profit organisation devoted to developing, representing and servicing original music in the Northern Territory of Australia. The organisation, formed in 1996, serves a support network for musicians in the Northern Territory who are often disadvantaged by social conditions and by living in remote areas It has offices located in Darwin and Alice Springs.

== Initiatives ==
Some of MusicNT's initiatives include:

- National Indigenous Music Awards
- Bush Bands Bash
- Plus1 Initiative
- intune darwin (annual music conference)
- MiNT Radio
- Hot Shots Music Photography exhibition
